= Australian cricket team in England in 1902 =

International cricket tour

- Part of 1902 English cricket season
- Date: 5 May 1902 – 17 September 1902
- Location: United Kingdom
- Result: Australia won the 5-Test series 2–1
Teams
- Australia: England
Captains
- Joe Darling: Archie MacLaren
Most runs
- C. Hill (258) V.T. Trumper (247): F.S. Jackson (311); J.T. Tyldesley (245); A.C. MacLaren (198)
Most wickets
- H. Trumble (26) J.V. Saunders (18) M.A. Noble (14): W. Rhodes (22); W.H. Lockwood (17)

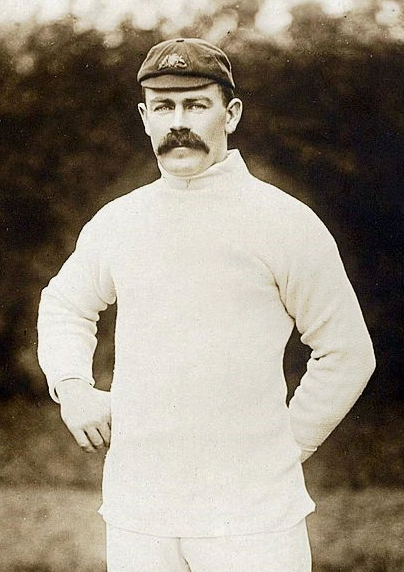
Joe Darling, the Australian captain

The Australian cricket team toured England during the 1902 English cricket season. The five-Test series between the two countries has been fondly remembered; in 1967 the cricket writer A. A. Thomson described the series as "a rubber more exciting than any in history except the Australia v West Indies series in 1960–61". Australia had won the previous three Test rubbers between the two countries, and now won their fourth successive series, by two matches to one with two draws. In the process they "beat the records of all their predecessors in the country" by losing only two of 39 matches during the tour, their defeats being against England in the Fifth Test and in the first of their two fixtures against Yorkshire. The remaining 37 matches gave 23 wins for Australia and 14 draws.

Following the tour, three of the Australians — Victor Trumper, Warwick Armstrong and Jim Kelly — were named Wisden Cricketers of the Year in 1903, with their captain Joe Darling already having been bestowed that honour in 1900. The Australians' leading batsman, Victor Trumper, made more first class runs than anyone in the season, and of batsman with more than 1,000 runs only Arthur Shrewsbury scored his at a higher average. His 2,570 runs was a new record for any Australian in England. Harry Altham wrote: "From start to finish of the season, on every sort of wicket, against every sort of bowling, Trumper entranced the eye, inspired his side, demoralized his enemies, and made run-getting appear the easiest thing in the world."

== Background ==
Australia had won their three previous Test series against England and thus were the holders of the Ashes. The most recent series had been played in Australia only a few months earlier, and the home side had won it by the wide margin of four matches to one. However five leading English players – George Hirst, Wilfred Rhodes, K.S. Ranjitsinjhi, Stanley Jackson and C.B. Fry – had been unavailable.

== Australian touring party ==
Name	Playing style	State team	Tests played
Joe Darling (c)	LHB	South Australia	5
Jim Kelly (wk)	RHB	New South Wales	5
Sammy Carter (wk)	RHB	New South Wales	0
Warwick Armstrong	RHB, LB or RFM	Victoria	5
Reggie Duff	RHB, RM	New South Wales	5
Syd Gregory	RHB, RA	New South Wales	5
Albert Hopkins	RHB, RFM	New South Wales	5
William Howell	LHB, RM	New South Wales	1
Clem Hill	LHB, LB	South Australia	5
Ernie Jones	RHB, RF	South Australia	2
Monty Noble	RHB, OB	New South Wales	5
Jack Saunders	LHB, SLA or LM	Victoria	4
Hugh Trumble	RHB, OB	Victoria	3
Victor Trumper	RHB	New South Wales	5

Key: RHB: right-handed batsman; LHB: left-handed batsman; RA: right-arm bowler.

The manager was Major Ben Wardill, while the team's "medical advisor" was Dr. Rowley Pope.

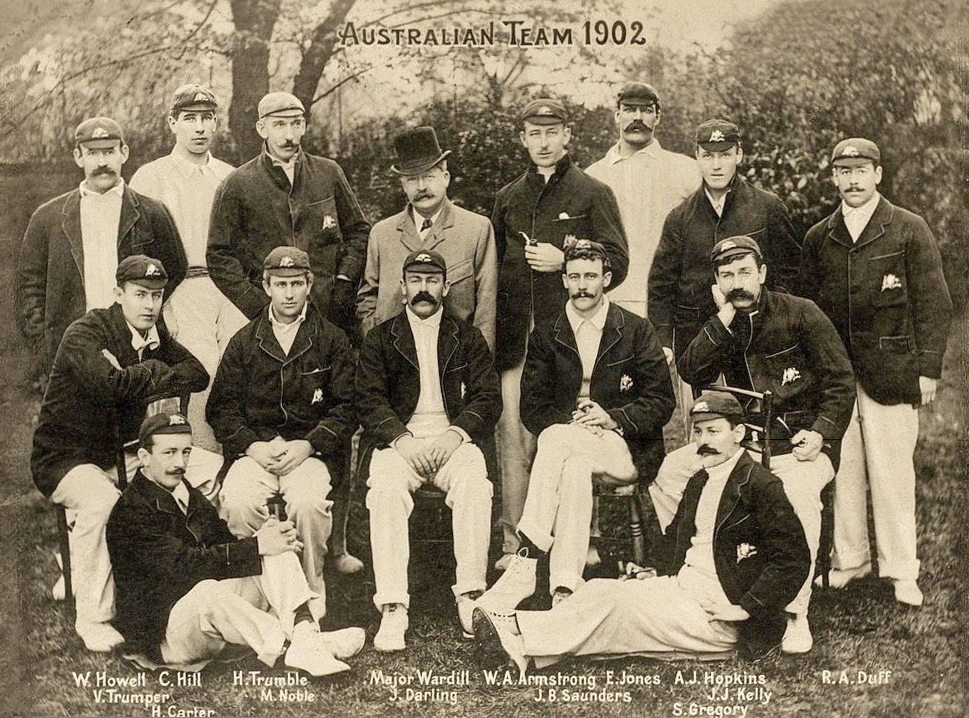
Australia's 1902 touring team

== Matches ==
=== 5–7 May: London County v Australians ===
Australians (117 and 213/7) drew with London County (235)

The London County Cricket Club, founded in 1899, faced the Australians for the first time, having played touring teams from the West Indies, South Africa and Netherlands in preceding seasons. Rain delayed play at the Crystal Palace Park on the first day, but when it began the South African Test bowler Charlie Llewellyn took five wickets, bowling unchanged through the Australians' innings. Captain W. G. Grace ended the innings, and was then bowled by Monty Noble with two runs on the scoreboard. However, after Len Braund's 140-minute hundred, London County had made 235, and Llewellyn took two more wickets with the new ball as the Australians found themselves at 16 for two. However, opener Victor Trumper made 64 and captain Joe Darling 92, as the Australians led by 85 runs with three wickets in hand overnight. A further ten runs were added in the 15 minutes of play on the final day, as the game was drawn.

=== 8–10 May: Nottinghamshire v Australians ===
Australians (474) beat Nottinghamshire (287 and 183) by an innings and four runs

Nottinghamshire won the toss at Trent Bridge and batted through the first day to make 287. The Australians lost their first five wickets for 137, but Darling, batting at number five, made the Australians' first hundred of the tour. His innings of five hours lasted into the third day. The seventh-wicket stand with Bert Hopkins was worth 131 runs, and the eighth-wicket stand with wicketkeeper Jim Kelly a further 119. The Australians made 474, before Warwick Armstrong took career-best figures of eight for 47 as the hosts were bowled out for 183 to secure the Australians' first win on tour.

=== 12–14 May: Surrey v Australians ===
Australians (296/5d) beat Surrey (96 & 122) by an innings and 78 runs

Eighty minutes of play was possible on the first day, in which Trumper made his way to 47 not out and Surrey's Tom Richardson took the only wicket. Play was further delayed on the second day, which had the Prince of Wales among the attendance at The Oval. Trumper converted his 47 into 101, and Noble and Armstrong put on an unbeaten stand of 80 before the Australians declared. Surrey were 18 for nought overnight, but lost all twenty wickets on the final day, with Bill Howell taking a match haul of eleven for 56 from 30 overs.

=== 15–17 May: Essex v Australians ===
Essex (178 & 13/2) drew with Australians (249/8d)

At Leyton, the Australians drew with Essex in a match affected by the weather. Percy Perrin hit 63 on the first day, when Essex reached 178, and on the second day only 70 minutes of play was possible, as the Australians reached 59 for one. On the third day, Australia took a lead of 61 before declaring in the afternoon, but after seven overs had yielded two wickets, play was abandoned.

=== 19–21 May: Leicestershire v Australians ===
Australians (126 & 69/3) beat Leicestershire (51 & 143) by seven wickets

Ernie Jones and Monty Noble bowled out Leicestershire for 51 in 35.1 overs at Aylestone Road after they chose to bat, but Leicestershire bowler Arthur Woodcock replied with three wickets in four balls, and Australia were seven for three. That became 43 for four at the end of the day; on the second day, Jones top-scored with 40 from number ten, in a stand of 49 with Jack Saunders, and the lead grew from 26 to 75. Leicestershire responded with 143 in 46.1 overs, while Noble took eight wickets, and on the final day Australia chased 69 in 20 overs.

=== 22–24 May: Oxford University v Australians ===
Australians (314/6d) beat Oxford University (77 & 183) by an innings and 54 runs

Oxford University were bowled out by Noble and Armstrong on the second morning at Christ Church, after rain had prevented any play on the first. Batting out the second day, the tourists almost trebled the students' score on that day alone, for the loss of two wickets, with Trumper making 121. They added a further 87 to the total before declaring, and Saunders then bowled the university out, taking seven for 67.

=== 26–28 May: Marylebone Cricket Club v Australians ===
Marylebone Cricket Club (240 & 280/8d) drew with Australians (271 & 217/3)

At Lord's, the Marylebone Cricket Club side captained by W. G. Grace included two players who would turn out for England in the first Test match, C. B. Fry and Ranjitsinhji. In both innings, the two passed 20, with Ranjitsinhji's 67 in the first innings being the highest score for MCC. Grace won the toss and chose to bat, and MCC made 240, but Trumper completed his third century on tour with a two-hour 105, taking the tourists to a lead of 31 though no other player passed 30. Grace took five for 29, including the three lowest-batting players. In the second innings, Frank Mitchell hit 55 not out before MCC declared with a lead of 249, and the tourists fell 32 short, Trumper once more passing 80 before being bowled by Albert Trott.

=== First Test, 29–31 May: England v Australia ===
29–31 May 1902
Scorecard

England	v	Australia
376/9d (142 overs); JT Tyldesley 138 (262 mins); E Jones 3/76 (28 overs)		36 (23 overs); VT Trumper 18 (70 mins); W Rhodes 7/17 (11 overs)
		46/2 (28 overs); RA Duff 15; W Rhodes 1/9 (10 overs)

Match drawn
Edgbaston, Birmingham
Umpires: W Hearn and J Phillips

- England won the toss and elected to bat.

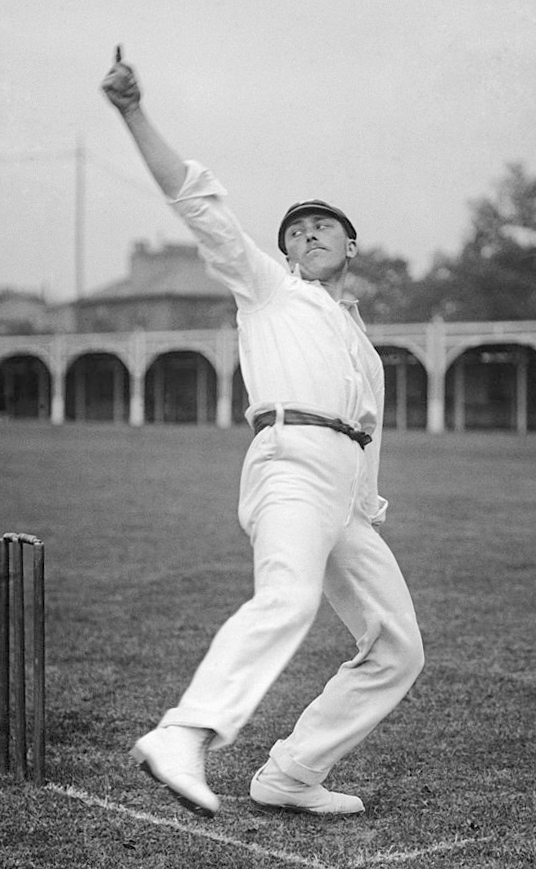
Wilfred Rhodes

England had selected 14 players, but left out Jack Mason, Charlie Llewellyn, who had represented South Africa in Test cricket, and Tom Hayward for the game. A.A. Thomson wrote that this was reckoned the best integrated side that England ever put into the field: MacLaren, Fry, Tyldesley, Ranjitsinhji, Jackson, Braund, Jessop, Hirst, Lilley, Lockwood and Rhodes. Australia off-spinner Hugh Trumble had an injured thumb and could not play; Australia also left out wicketkeeper Carter, and Saunders, who had "not shown bowling form" yet, having taken 14 wickets in four matches at a bowling average of 14.21, of which seven came on the final day against Oxford University.

England batted first on what was described as a "beautiful wicket", but Fry was out in the third over, caught behind by the wicketkeeper standing back, and captain Archie MacLaren was then run out for nine after a "misunderstanding". After 50 minutes at the crease, Ranjitsinhji, who was described as "upset" by getting the blame for MacLaren's run out, was bowled by second-change bowler Warwick Armstrong for 13, and England were 35 for three. Jackson then batted until lunch with Tyldesley, and had made 53 when he inside edged Ernie Jones shortly afterwards. Wicketkeeper Lilley followed, having skied a ball from Noble to Jones, while Tyldesley had the luck to survive three dropped catches. Tyldesley went on to make a "turning point" partnership with Hirst for 94 in 80 minutes, while Jessop was caught at deep cover having made six and played "very wild cricket". Tyldesley was last out on the day, having made 138, an innings described as "truly magnificent" despite the chances, including "masterly defence" and well timed cuts.

Lockwood and Rhodes added 55 before stumps on the first day, and when play resumed at three o'clock on the second day after rain had fallen during the night, they added a further 25 before MacLaren declared. What followed was described by Wisden as "one of the chief sensations of [the 1902 season]". It took 90 minutes to bowl out Australia for 36, with Trumper making half of the total, and though the light was bad the wicket was not "so difficult as to excuse such an ignominious breakdown". The Yorkshire bowlers Rhodes and Hirst bowled 22 of the 23 overs, in a manner described by the Wisden Almanack as "wonderful". Rhodes got seven wickets for 17, his first five-wicket haul in Test cricket, and up until 2004 joint cheapest seven-for in Test history. Hirst was helped by Braund to get one of his wickets, as the Somerset allrounder pulled off "a dazzling catch" to dismiss Clem Hill. For 22 years, the total of 36 stood as the lowest total in a Test match in England.

However, more rain followed. Twelve hours of unbroken rain during Friday night left the wicket unplayable, and though the afternoon was fine no play was possible until quarter past five. The thousands that were admitted got to watch 75 minutes of cricket, in which Australia "easily" batted through 28 overs, 13 of them maidens.

=== 2–3 June: Yorkshire v Australians ===
Yorkshire (107 & 50/5) beat Australians (131 & 23) by five wickets

Yorkshire, defending county champions and joint leaders of the 1902 championship, lost the toss at Headingley, were trailing by 24 on first innings, but still became the first team to beat the tourists during the 1902 tour. In fact, they were the only county team to register a win against the Australians.

The Australians won the toss and batted, making 131, Trumper top-scoring with 38 while Hirst and Stanley Jackson took four wickets each. Yorkshire lost their three first wickets before the close of the first day, David Denton becoming the second batsman to make more than 25 with his 32, and on the second morning Noble and Howell took the remaining seven wickets to bowl Yorkshire out for 107. Then, the Australians lost six wickets in 13 overs, with Trumper making seven and Gregory an unbeaten ten. Hirst had Trumper, Darling, Noble and Armstrong all bowled, as well as Duff caught by Jackson. With the score 23 for six, Hopkins faced the second ball of Jackson's seventh over – and was given out lbw. Kelly and Jones were bowled, Howell was caught at the wicket, Jackson completed four wickets with five balls, and Yorkshire were left with a target of 48. With Tom Taylor's 11 the highest total of the last two innings, the target was chased down in 19.3 overs, though Noble took three wickets and Howell two. A. A. Thomson recounts that his uncle said that the unbeaten nine made by Irving Washington was the "finest innings of Irving's life".

=== 5–7 June: Lancashire v Australians ===
Australians (356/7) drew with Lancashire

The tourists, fresh from scores of 36 in the Test match and 23 against Yorkshire, now got first use of the wicket at Old Trafford and registered four half-centuries on the first day, through Trumper, Hill, Armstrong and Kelly. The last two days' play were called off, and the match drawn.

=== 9–10 June: Cambridge University v Australians ===
Australians (337) beat Cambridge University (100 & 46) by an innings and 183 runs

The match was played at Fenner's. Despite being badly hit by illness, Australia won inside two days, for their largest victory on tour. Hugh Trumble played his first match on tour after recovering from an injured thumb, and took the first four wickets of the game, as Cambridge University were bowled out for 108. The Australians, who included their medical advisor, Rowley Pope, who had not played first class cricket since 1891, replied with 337, of which Trumper made 128, and Hopkins then took seven for 10 as the students were all out for 46.

=== Second Test, 12–14 June: England v Australia ===
12–14 June 1902
Scorecard

England	v	Australia
102/2 (38 overs); FS Jackson 55*; AJY Hopkins 2/18 (9 overs)

Match drawn
Lord's, London
Umpires: CE Richardson and VA Titchmarsh

- England won the toss and elected to bat.
- There was no play on the second and third days.

The second Test match was restricted to 105 minutes of play, rain and poor pitch conditions accounting for the rest. Australia were suffering from the same ill health that had weakened the team before and during their match in Cambridge; Trumble and Howell had influenza, while Darling, Noble and Saunders all felt ill, though did take part in the game. Saunders thus replaced Howell in the playing eleven. England went in with the same eleven that had played in Birmingham, with Tom Taylor as twelfth man.

England lost two wickets in the first four overs, without any batsman having added to the total; rain then kept interrupting the partnership between Jackson and MacLaren, but the two added 102, giving a few chances that were not taken by Australian fieldsmen. The match was abandoned at quarter past eleven on the third morning, with the ground almost under water. The match still holds the Test match record for the highest match aggregate without an extra.

The tourists' health problems and the bad weather which they had been experiencing, combined with their poor recent performances in the First Test and against Yorkshire, meant that this match could be seen as marking the low point of their fortunes. The remainder of the tour would prove far more successful.

=== 16–18 June: England XI v Australians ===
Australians (154 & 185) beat England XI (138 & 70) by 131 runs

The England XI which took the field at The Saffrons in Eastbourne was captained by Gilbert Jessop and included two more players with Test experience, Bobby Abel and Bill Storer. Neither had featured in the first two Tests of the series, however. Darling won the toss and chose to bat, though play was delayed until after lunch on the first day, and the Australians made 154, with Hill scoring 46 and Trumper 31. England XI then fell to 29 for five, Abel having made 26 of the runs, while Trumble took three wickets. He added a further five to that on the second day, bowling unchanged throughout the England XI's innings, and the eighth-wicket partnership between Jessop and Vivian Crawford was worth almost two-thirds of England XI's total. Trumble eventually had both men caught, and Gregory made 71 as the Australians set a target of 200, while the hosts George Thompson took eight for 88 in the second innings. Trumble then added six to his haul of wickets, as the England XI were bowled out for 70, with both Jessop and Crawford falling in single digits.

=== 19–21 June: Derbyshire v Australians ===
Australians (218 & 13/2) beat Derbyshire (152 & 78) by eight wickets

Derbyshire captain Albert Lawton made 50 from number six at Derby, including a 73-run fifth-wicket stand, and after that the last five pairs added 18 as Derbyshire were bowled out for 152. Hopkins, who opened the batting after going wicketless, made 68 and a stand of 113 with Darling, and the tourists were leading by four with six wickets in hand at close on the first day. No play was possible on the second day, but on the third the Australians added a further 52, before Saunders and Trumble bowled Derbyshire out for 78. After losing the first two wickets for two runs, Carter and Duff made it to the target of 13 for no further loss.

=== 23–24 June: Yorkshire v Australians ===
Australians (106 & 87) beat Yorkshire (77 & 72) by 44 runs

The Australians travelled to Park Avenue Cricket Ground in Bradford seeking to gain revenge for the defeat three weeks earlier, which they did, in a match where the average partnership was worth 8.55 runs – the lowest thus far on tour, beating 8.88 in the previous Yorkshire v Australians clash. The Australians batted first, and Hill and Darling put on 74 for the third wicket, before Rhodes and Schofield Haigh bowled them out for 106. In reply, Saunders and Trumble took all ten wickets after bowling unchanged through 29.2 overs, Trumble getting six for 17 while Saunders took four for 58, with wicket-keeper David Hunter top-scoring with 14 from number eleven.

The Australians led by 29, and despite a Haigh five-for, Gregory made an unbeaten 42 which lasted into the second day, setting a target of 117. John Brown and John Tunnicliffe put on 14 for the first wicket, but Trumble and Saunders then took four wickets for one run, and though Irving Washington made the highest score in the match for Yorkshire with 22, Trumble ended with six for 27 as the Australians triumphed by 44 runs.

=== 26–28 June: England XI v Australians ===
Australians (402 & 42/3) beat England XI (240 & 203, f/o) by seven wickets

This match was hastily arranged; the coronation of Edward VII was planned for 26 June, but the King developed appendicitis and the Australians decided to remain at Bradford to play an England XI. It included one former Test player, Willie Quaife. The Australians won the toss, batted first, and made a total higher than the entire previous match had produced. Trumper made 113 before he was bowled by Jack Knutton of Coventry, who had played one first class match eight years before, and now returned to take nine for 100. Knutton, who usually played in the Bradford Leagues, bowled at quick pace but his action was sometimes regarded as suspect. In his second over, he bowled Noble, Hill and Darling, but Trumper and Duff put on 193 for the fifth wicket, before Trumper fell five short of the ground's fifth-wicket record. Duff went on to make 182 before he, too, was bowled by Knutton. The England XI were bowled out for 240 and 203, with Quaife making 68 in the first and captain Reginald Crawford making 90 in the second, and Knutton had Darling out a second time before the Australians chased down the total with seven wickets to spare.

=== 30 June – 1 July: Scotland v Australians ===
Australians (305) beat Scotland (109 & 91) by an innings and 105 runs

This match at The Grange was not considered first class. Scotland made 109 in the first innings, and the Australians responded with 283 for six at the close of the first day's play, with Duff having made 98. Hopkins was on 42 not out overnight; he did not add to that, but the Australians still added 22, all coming from Jones at No. 10 and Saunders at No. 11. Needing 195 to make the Australians bat again, Scotland were bowled out for 91, with the Australians using six bowlers.

=== Third Test, 3–5 July: England v Australia ===
3–5 July 1902
Scorecard

Australia	v	England
194 (66.1 overs); MA Noble 47 (70 mins); SF Barnes 6/49 (20 overs)		145 (61.3 overs); R Abel 38; JV Saunders 5/50 (15.3 overs)
289 (72.1 overs); C Hill 119 (145 mins); W Rhodes 5/63 (17.1 overs)		195 (60.5 overs); AC MacLaren 63; MA Noble 6/52 (21 overs)

Australia won by 143 runs
Bramall Lane, Sheffield
Umpires: J Phillips and W Richards

- Australia won the toss and elected to bat.

This was to be the only Test match played at Bramall Lane in Sheffield, which became England's seventh Test ground. From Australia's squad for the second Test, one change was made, as a recovered Trumble replaced Ernie Jones in the eleven. Jack Saunders retained his place, having not featured in the first match. England made several changes; Bobby Abel was originally selected to replace Fry in the top order, but Ranjitsinhji was ruled out due to a strained leg and Fry took his place back. Schofield Haigh had also been added to the twelve originally, but both he and Lockwood were left out in favour of Sydney Barnes, a last-minute replacement. Wisden claimed that "there [could] be no question that a grave mistake was committed in not playing Lockwood."

The English Wisden account acknowledged that Australia "played the finer all-round cricket" and "fully deserved their victory", but still claimed that "all the luck of the game went their way" as they won by 143 runs. The first lucky streak was to win the toss and bat; Braund opened the bowling with Hirst, and had Trumper out bowled for one early on. Barnes took the next four wickets, all caught, including Darling for a golden duck, before Noble and Hopkins added 54 for the sixth wicket, the largest partnership thus far in the game. Noble was out caught off Rhodes, and Barnes removed Hopkins and Kelly, but Armstrong and Trumble put on 57 for the ninth wicket and Australia totalled 194.

Again according to the Wisden account, England had "much of the best of the match" when MacLaren and Abel had taken the score to 60 for nought. But Noble bowled both, and as the light faded Noble and Saunders struck three more times before England successfully appealed against bad light a quarter before the scheduled close. By then England had lost three wickets for a single run, to close on 102 for five with Lilley and Braund set to resume.

Rain then fell overnight and the start of the second day's play was delayed, after which England lost their last five wickets for 43 runs, with Jessop the only England batsman to make it into double figures. Then, Trumper entered, to play what Wisden described as his most "marvellous" innings of the summer. In 50 minutes, he scored 62, the first half-century in the match, "doing whatsoever he liked with the English bowling", before he was caught behind off Jackson's bowling. Barnes had Darling caught with no further score added, but then Hill and Gregory got together. Hill then became the only man to score a Test century at Bramall Lane, leaving with the total on 225 after "a great innings", and though it was "not entirely free from fault" with a couple of dropped catches, it took a "wonderful catch" by MacLaren off Jackson to dismiss him.

Hopkins and Armstrong added 52 for the seventh wicket, taking the lead past 300, before Rhodes took the final four wickets in 19 balls. England now needed 339 to win the game, which would be a new Test record, the previous one of 315 being set by Australia in January. They sent Jessop out to open the innings, and he made an unbeaten 53 overnight, as England closed on 73 for one. However, on the third morning they lost three wickets in the first half-hour, and despite MacLaren's "great effort" of 63, including an hour-long stand with Jackson, it was Noble (six for 52) and Trumble (four for 49) who came out on top. On Saturday morning, after coming on for Saunders, he took five for 22 in twelve overs, though the pitch "show[ed] unmistakable signs of wear". Noble ended with eleven for 103, his second and last ten-wicket haul in Test match cricket.

=== 7–9 July: Warwickshire v Australians ===
Warwickshire (124 & 225/7d) drew with Australians (316)

Warwickshire won the toss at Edgbaston, chose to bat, and were bowled out by Warwick Armstrong, who took six for 13 as Warwickshire fell from 98 for three to 124 all out. Nine Australians made it into double figures, though only Gregory got past 50, making 83. Warwickshire closed the second day ten runs ahead and with five wickets down. Only forty minutes of play was possible on the third day, with Ernie Jones taking both wickets before the game was eventually called off as a draw.

=== 10–12 July: Worcestershire v Australians ===
Australians (274 & 199) beat Worcestershire (202 & 97) by 174 runs

Albert Bird got six wickets for Worcestershire after they were put in the field at New Road. The Australians made 274, then bowled out Worcestershire for 202 despite a last-wicket stand of 62 between George Gaukrodger and Robert Burrows. At the end of the second day, the Australians had added a further 169 for the loss of five wickets, and though they lost their final wickets for 30 runs, Worcestershire were bowled out for 97 by Ernie Jones (six for 53) and Warwick Armstrong (four for 34)

=== 14–16 July: Gloucestershire v Australians ===
Australians (545/5d) beat Gloucestershire (155 & 168) by an innings and 222 runs

Gloucestershire became the first side to concede 500 against the Australians, and suffered the largest defeat margin thus far on tour, losing by an innings and 222 runs at Ashley Down. After winning the toss and batting, they were bowled out for 155, then conceded 111 against Trumper and Duff before the day was over – Trumper making 83 of those runs. On the second day, Trumper was caught by Jessop for 92, but Hill, Noble and Hopkins all made hundreds, as the Australians totalled 434 in a day. They declared overnight, before bowling Gloucestershire out for 168.

=== 17–19 July: Somerset v Australians ===
Somerset (274 & 315) drew with Australians (348 & 16/0)

In this match at Taunton, Somerset batted first. Saunders took five wickets for 109 for the tourists on the first day, four caught and one lbw as the hosts made 274. In reply, Somerset got two wickets, but Duff had made 75 by stumps on the first day; when he gave a return catch to George Gill, he had made 183 in a three-hour innings, which turned out to be more than half of the Australians' total. Somerset were 159 for five overnight, with Lionel Palairet having made 90, but Somerset's Randall Johnson made 62 as they almost doubled that score on the third day. The Australians did not have enough time to chase 242 for victory.

=== 21–23 July: Surrey v Australians ===
Surrey (296 & 111) drew with Australians (313 & 11/0)

At The Oval, England Test batsman Bobby Abel made a hundred for Surrey, who batted through the entire first day to make 296. The Australians then scored 313 at almost double the rate, with play ending early on the second day due to rain, before Saunders took six for nine to bowl Surrey out for 111. However, as the Australians had to travel to Manchester for the Fourth Test, they did not attempt to chase 95 for victory.

=== Fourth Test: 24–26 July: England v Australia ===
24–26 July 1902
Scorecard

Australia	v	England
299 (76.1 overs); VT Trumper 104 (115 mins); WH Lockwood 6/48 (20.1 overs)		262 (114 overs); FS Jackson 128; H Trumble 4/75 (43 overs)
86 (47.4 overs); J Darling 37; WH Lockwood 5/28 (17 overs)		120 (49.4 overs); AC MacLaren 35; H Trumble 6/53 (25 overs)

Australia won by 3 runs
Old Trafford, Manchester
Umpires: J Moss and T Mycroft

- Australia won the toss and elected to bat.
- LCH Palairet and FW Tate (both ENG) made their Test debuts.

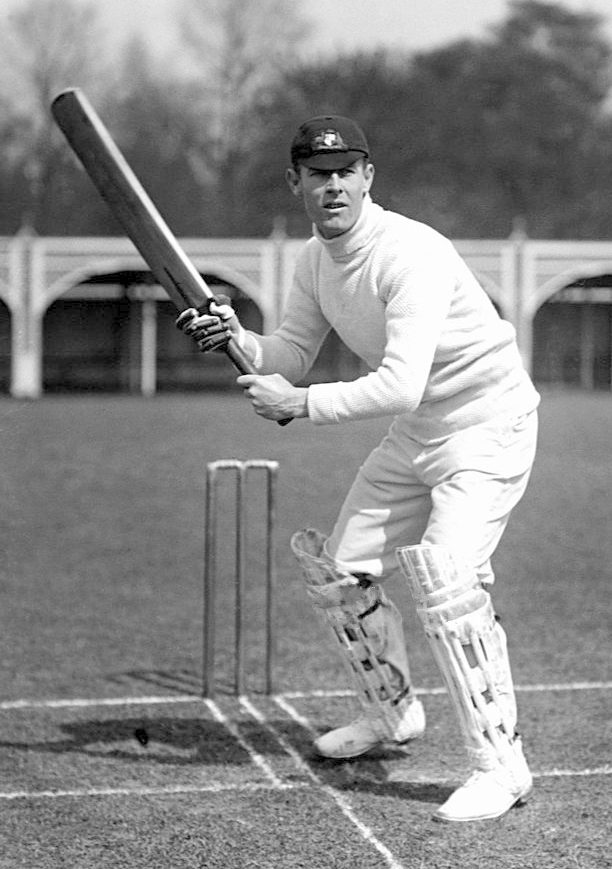
Victor Trumper

Australia secured the series with one match to play, though only with a three-run margin, as England, who required 32 to win with seven wickets in hand, fell to Trumble and Saunders' bowling. A. A. Thomson claimed that this match, along with the fifth Test of this series, was "the most dramatic in Test history" when he wrote in 1967, excepting the Tied Test in 1960–61. Neville Cardus, who later wrote an article on the game he had watched as a 14-year-old, said: "The match at the end seemed to get right out of the control of the men that were making it; it seemed to take on a being of its own, a volition of its own, and the mightiest cricketers in the land looked as though they were in the grip of a power of which they could feel the presence but whose ends they could not understand."

Australia, who went in unchanged from the Third Test, won the toss and batted first against an England side where Lionel Palairet, Ranjitsinhji, Lockwood and Fred Tate had replaced Fry, Hirst, Jessop and Barnes. The Sussex bowler Tate was given his Test debut, but it was to be his only one; nevertheless, the match is known as Tate's match. He dropped a crucial catch, and was last man out when England heeded only four more runs to win. In the 1903 Wisden, it is claimed that leaving out Hirst for Tate was a "blunder", though the decision was inspired by a rain-affected wicket. Likewise, not selecting Jessop was called "a mistake".

According to Barker and Rosenwater England did well to get so close to winning as they did, Australia gaining a large advantage from batting first. The ground was very wet when play began, and the pitch was initially slow and easy. Furthermore, the bowlers' run-ups were so slippery that Lockwood was unable to bowl for over an hour.

According to Wisden, "the ball did nothing on the soft turf", but the England bowlers pitched it too short, allowing Trumper and Duff to add 135 in the first 80 minutes before Duff was caught at the wicket by third-change bowler Lockwood, who had been introduced with the score on 129. Australia were 173 for one at lunch, with Trumper becoming the first player in a Test to reach his hundred before lunch, before Rhodes struck three times to remove Trumper, Noble and Gregory, all caught with ten further runs added since lunch. Trumper's 104 was described as "one without mistake of any kind." Another stand developed, however, between Darling and Hill; Darling made 51 before he was caught by England captain MacLaren, and the two added 73 for the fifth wicket, a partnership described as invaluable by Wisden. Darling hit two sixes, the first in a Test in England (prior to 1910 the ball had to be hit out of the ground for six runs to be awarded, so that sixes were rare).

The wicket had dried out since lunch, and Saunders and Trumble took five wickets for 44, with only Tyldesley passing 20 for England on the first day. They closed on 70 for five, but the following day was "England's day". First, Jackson and Braund added 115 to the overnight score, a stand broken just before lunch when Braund was bowled by Noble, steering a ball outside off onto the stumps. Jackson then kept the scoring rate going, making 128, the highest score of the game, and England's total increased by 77 before he was finally out, 24 of them contributed by the lower-order batsmen, who were out to Noble and Trumble. England thus trailed by 37 on first innings, having been given some runs when Gregory missed "the simplest of chances" at cover point, but Australia were undone by Lockwood's bowling. He took the new ball, removed Trumper, Hill and Duff, and Australia were ten for three. Six more runs were added before the left-handed Darling hit a catch to deep square leg on the railway side, where Palairet would normally have fielded. But MacLaren had sent Tate, normally a close-in fielder, to that position. Tate dropped the catch, and Darling went on to make 37, the highest score of the innings, and share a stand of 48 with Gregory before Tate broke the stand, having Gregory lbw. Wisden speculated it was likely that the Australians would have been all out for 50–60 if the catch had been held. Despite Lockwood's five-wicket-haul, and match figures of eleven for 76, Australia lasted into the third morning, making 86, and setting a target of 124. This total is still the lowest all-out innings in Test match history to include a fifty partnership (Joe Darling and Syd Gregory added 54 runs for the 4th wicket).

Rain had fallen for considerable time overnight, making the pitch difficult, though MacLaren and Palairet cut 36 off the target before lunch was taken. Palairet was then bowled by Saunders, and Tyldesley and MacLaren followed, the latter caught far out in the field by Duff for 35. Australia's Saunders then dropped Abel before rain stopped play again. After the break, England's batsmen were instructed to hit out. Abel added 20 with Ranjitsinhji, who looked uncertain against Trumble and was eventually given lbw, and Trumble and Saunders kept at the English batsmen. Abel was bowled trying to drive, Jackson caught at mid off, Braund stumped, and Lockwood bowled, England now requiring 11 to win with two wickets in hand. Rhodes came in and struck a boundary, and Lilley hit two scoring shots to take the tally to 116, before Hill, starting from long on, took a brilliant running catch square in the deep, in front of the pavilion, to dismiss him when the ball, albeit held up in the wind, had seemed sure to go for four.

Then rain struck once more, and the players left the field for 45 minutes. When they returned, seven runs were required, and the debutant Tate came to the crease to face Saunders. He edged down the leg side for four with the first ball, before the next two were no-scoring shots. The fourth ball of the over, a quicker one which kept low, struck the stumps, leaving Tate bowled and Australia winners by three runs.

The inclusion of Tate in the England side appears to have been a result of friction between MacLaren and the selectors (and in particular their chairman, Lord Hawke) that had developed during the course of the series. According to Fry, the selectors included Tate in the twelve (he was a late addition to the eleven originally selected) because they thought that MacLaren could not possibly pick him and would therefore have to play their preferred eleven. However, MacLaren was supposedly annoyed that Haigh was not included, and therefore on the morning of the match chose Tate for the final eleven in preference to Hirst. However, Tate had been having a great season, eventually finishing second in the first-class wicket tallies behind Rhodes, and an argument could be made for his inclusion.

=== 28–30 July: Essex v Australians ===
Essex (345 & 184/3d) drew with Australians (232 & 253/6)

The Australians got their third successive draw against a county side at Leyton, with Victor Trumper making a pair of hundreds. Essex lost five wickets on the first day, with Frederick Fane, Charlie McGahey and Charles Kortright all passing 50. Jones took four wickets as Essex could only add a further 34 on the second day, before Australia were bowled out 113 short; Trumper made nearly half the total, while no Essex bowler took more than two wickets. Three more half-centuries, from Alfred Lucas, Percy Perrin and McGahey followed before Essex declared, and Australia batted out the day for a draw, Trumper making 119.

=== 31 July – 2 August: Sussex v Australians ===
Australians (580/6d) drew with Sussex (185 & 130/1, f/o)

The Australians drew their fourth successive match, which nevertheless provided a few records. Monty Noble recorded his highest career score, making 284 and sharing a partnership of 428 with Warwick Armstrong, a new sixth-wicket record for The County Ground at Hove, which has remained standing for over 100 years. Tate, the unlucky man from the Fourth Test, bowled 41 overs without reward, while Albert Relf took four wickets before meeting Noble and Armstrong. Noble was eventually stumped off Ernest Killick, leaving a declaration. In reply Sussex were 84 for three overnight, eventually bowled out for 185 as Saunders took four for 22, but Vine and Killick held on for the draw by batting out 39 overs after being asked to follow on.

=== 4–5 August: Glamorgan and Wiltshire v Australians ===
Australians (148 & 155/4) beat Glamorgan and Wiltshire (121 & 178)

The then minor counties Glamorgan and Wiltshire fielded a combined team for a non-first class match at Cardiff Arms Park. The hosts made 121, before William Overton and Harry Creber shared the first seven wickets, all falling in single digits except Hill. Jones and Hopkins passed 30, however, and the Australians took a lead of 27; however, despite seven for 36 from Armstrong, Herbie Morgan and Walter Medlicott scored half-centuries as Glamorgan made the highest total of the match, 178, on the second morning. Kelly's unbeaten 42 and Gregory's 44 helped the visitors chase the target of 152 with six wickets to spare.

=== 7–8 August: Hampshire v Australians ===
Australians (325) beat Hampshire (130 & 116) by an innings and 79 runs

The match at Southampton's County Ground was originally scheduled to be a three-day affair, but due to the postponed coronation of King Edward VII, it was agreed to hold a two-day match. The Australians still won; after Hampshire decided to bat, Trumble bowled unchanged and took three for 53, while from the other end Noble took six wickets after being introduced in the 22nd over. The visitors were 69 for four when Noble came to the wicket, and together with Darling he quickly put the runs on the board. At stumps on day one they had added 107 without loss; Darling made 116 in 80 minutes, joining Noble in a stand of 155, and despite the lower order all being bowled by Arthur Hill the Australians made 325 in 61.1 overs, with Noble ending on 113. After Saunders had got the openers out caught and Sprot had been run out, Trumble took the remaining wickets bar one, and Sussex were bowled out for 116.

=== Fifth Test: 11–13 August: England v Australia ===
11–13 August 1902
Scorecard

Australia	v	England
324 (123.5 overs); H Trumble 64*; GH Hirst 5/77 (29 overs)		183 (61 overs); GH Hirst 43 (45 mins); H Trumble 8/65 (31 overs)
121 (60 overs); C Hill 34; WH Lockwood 5/45 (20 overs)		263/9 (66.5 overs); GL Jessop 104 (77 mins); JV Saunders 4/105 (24 overs)

England won by 1 wicket
The Oval, London
Umpires: CE Richardson and A White

- Australia won the toss and elected to bat.

Remarkably, this match turned out to be as exciting as the previous one had been. It has become known as "Jessop's match", for his 104 in only 77 minutes in England's second innings turned the game. When he came to the wicket, England were 48/5, and scoring the 263 that they needed to win seemed far beyond them. Saunders had taken four of the wickets. Jessop's previous highest Test score was only 55, but now he reached his hundred off just 76 balls, after an uncertain start when he gave two chances with his score in the twenties. He and Jackson added 109, before Jackson was out for 49 to make the score 157/6. Hirst helped him take the score to 187 before Jessop himself was out. Wisden said of his innings: All things considered a more astonishing display has never been seen. What he did would have been scarcely possible under the same circumstances to any other living batsmen.

With 76 still needed and only three wickets remaining, the odds seemed once more to have shifted against England. Lockwood scored only two, but he helped Hirst add another 27 before being dismissed: 214/8. Lilley helped Hirst to add a further 34 before he was Trumble's fourth victim of the innings and twelfth of the match: 248/9. (Darling had entrusted almost all the bowling to Saunders and Trumble; they sent down all but nine overs of the 66.5 that the innings lasted.) So Rhodes joined Hirst with 15 still needed. Legend has it that Hirst said to Rhodes, "We'll get them in singles, Wilfred." However Rhodes denied the story, Hirst said he could not recall what his words had been, and not every run was a single. But get the runs they did, Hirst finishing with 58 not out. He had top-scored with 43 in just 45 minutes in the first innings, as well as taking 5 wickets in Australia's first innings, so this was his match almost as much as it was Jessop's.

Returning to the beginning of the match, England crucially, as it proved, recalled Jessop and Hirst, omitting Ranji and Tate. Tom Hayward came in for his first match of the series, replacing Abel. Australia were once more unchanged. When Australia batted first, the pitch – though wet – played easily. England did well to reduce them to 175/7, but Hopkins, Trumble and Kelly ensured that the eighth and ninth wickets contributed another 149.

Rain in the night made the pitch difficult, and England were 94/6 at lunch, Trumble having taken five of the wickets. The wicket improved after lunch, and Braund and Hirst added 54 for the seventh wicket. England still needed 38 to avoid the likelihood of being asked to follow on, with the sun coming out and the wicket likely soon to deteriorate once more, but Lockwood helped Hirst add a further 42. Crucially, Hill missed Lockwood in the deep not long after he had come in. Though the ninth and tenth wickets fell quickly, England had reduced their first innings deficit to 141. Trumble, having top scored for Australia, had followed up by taking 8/65.

At the end of the second day, Australia had reached 114/8, never recovering from the early loss of Trumper to a run out, and the last two wickets fell quickly the next morning. Lockwood finished with 5/45. So England were left 263 to win, and the stage was set for Jessop's heroics.

=== 14–16 August: Marylebone Cricket Club v Australians ===
Australians (427) beat Marylebone Cricket Club (212 & 181) by an innings and 34 runs

MCC won the toss at Lord's and batted first. They struggled, with Ranjitsinhji top scoring with 60 and Howell taking 6/105. The Australians were 80/2 at the end of the day's play. Next day, Hill took his score to 136, made in 240 minutes, with support from Noble (70) and Gregory (86). At the end of day two, MCC were 23–1. Next day, only H.A. Carpenter (66) and E. Smith (48) resisted for long. Armstrong took 6/44.

=== 18–20 August: Gloucestershire v Australians ===
Australians (312) beat Gloucestershire (152 & 150) by an innings and 10 runs

In spite of the loss of almost all of the first day to rain at the College Ground, Cheltenham, where the Australians batted first and reached 21/1, they had another comfortable victory. On the second day, Trumper made up for lost time by scoring 125 in only 120 minutes. Jessop took 7/91. By close of play, the county were 147/9, having collapsed from 103/3 at one stage. The last wicket soon fell the next morning, Armstrong finishing with 4/35 and Hopkins 4/11. Following on, the running out of Jessop for 43 probably sealed their fate, though W. Troup managed 45* and enabled a partial recovery from 69/6. Armstrong and Hopkins bowled unchanged, taking 4/74 and 5/65 respectively.

=== 21–23 August: Kent v Australians ===
Australians (154 & 209) beat Kent (77 & 197) by 89 runs

The tourists won the toss and batted first at the St Lawrence Ground, Canterbury. By the end of the day's play, 21 wickets had fallen, with the Australians 8/1 in their second innings. Noble top scored with 43 in their first innings, before being run out. Colin Blythe took 4/50 and Alec Hearne 3/39. If the Australians had found batting difficult, Kent found it even more so as Trumble, bowling unchanged, returned an analysis of 8/30, at the time the best of his career. James Seymour, batting at number 4, did well to survive, finishing on 26*. Conditions appeared a little easier for batting next day. Trumper made 69 before he was run out. Kent were set 287 to win. At one point they were 138/4, but then they fell away. Saunders took the last five wickets, to finish with figures of 5/43. Trumble had 3/92.

=== 25–27 August: Middlesex v Australians ===
Australians (232 & 176/4) beat Middlesex (205 & 203) by 6 wickets

When Middlesex won the toss and batted at Lord's, for the second match in succession Trumble took eight wickets in an innings, this time 8/101 bowling unchanged. PF Warner made 58. The tourists were 3/1 at the end of the first day. Next day, they could only establish a first innings lead of 28, their top scorer being Trumper with 69. At close of play, Middlesex had reached 122/5 in their second innings. When their innings was completed the following day, GW Beldam had made 75 and Trumble taken 4/48, giving him a total of 23 wickets in two consecutive matches. It had been a low-scoring matches, but the Australians had no difficulty in reaching their target, Noble (59*) and Armstrong (47) adding 95 for the fourth wicket. Trumper passed 2000 runs in first-class matches for the season when he reached 24 in the first innings. Trumble reached 100 wickets in first-class matches for the season when taking his 8th wicket in the first innings.

=== 28–30 August: Lancashire v Australians ===
Australians (138 & 105) beat Lancashire (120 & 105) by 18 runs

In a low-scoring match at the Liverpool Cricket Club Ground at Aigburth, the tourists almost suffered their third defeat. George Littlewood and Alexander Kermode shared 36 of the 38 overs in the Australian first innings, taking 5/49 and 5/68 respectively. At the end of the first day, Lancashire were 61/2, only 77 behind, but next morning they lost two wickets without adding to their score and only added another 44, Saunders finishing with 6/52. In their second innings, the Australians were 91/4, but then lost their last 6 wickets while only 14 runs were added. Littlewood took 7/49 for match figures of 12/98. At the close of the second day, the county were 77/5, needing only a further 47 to win. They added another 16 before the sixth wicket fell, but only managed 12 more before being all out. Trumble took 5/44 and Saunders 4/37. Littlewood's figures in each innings were his best in first-class cricket at the time, as were Kermode's in the first innings.

=== 1–3 September: Players v Australians ===
The Players (184 & 128) lost to Australians (359) by an innings and 47 runs

Winning the toss and batting at Harrogate, the Players were indebted to their captain Willie Quaife, who top-scored with 58. At one point 165/5, they then collapsed. Saunders finished with 4/44 and Hopkins had 3/21. By close of play, the Australians had reached 59/0 in reply. Next day, Trumper went on to 127 made in only 105 minutes and, with Darling and Hopkins each passing fifty, the tourists established a big lead. By the end of day two the Players had reached 30/2, and they were all out for another 98 on the final day, Saunders finishing with figures of 5/44.

=== 4–6 September: CI Thornton's XI v Australians ===
CI Thornton's XI (198 & 202/9d) drew with Australians (247 & 120/4)

CI Thornton had put together a strong side which included six Yorkshiremen. They won the toss at the North Marine Road ground at Scarborough and batted. They slumped to 79/6 but their captain, Stanley Jackson, scored 72 and led a partial recovery. Trumble took 5/62 and Saunders 5/74. The Australians were 31/2 at the day's end. Next day, Trumper made 62 and Hopkins 49*, but the tourists led by only 49 on first innings. Wilfred Rhodes took 4/95 and George Thompson 3/32. By close of play the home side were 87/6 in their second innings, but next day Johnny Tyldesley, who had been 55* overnight, went on to make 88. An unbroken last wicket stand of 52 by Haigh and Rhodes enabled Thornton's XI to declare. Saunders finished with 5/95. When Trumper (55) was the fourth wicket to fall, the visitors gave up the chase for the 154 that they needed to win and accepted the draw, having batted for 24.5 overs.

=== 8–10 September: South v Australians ===
Australians (249 & 248) drew with the South (403/7d & 87/5)

At Hastings the Australians very nearly suffered what would have been their third defeat, with the South, captained by WG Grace, being only eight runs short of victory when time ran out. The tourists made a partial recovery from 94/5 thanks to Noble (63) and Hopkins (74), supported by Trumble, but after Hopkins was the seventh man out the end came quickly, Cuthbert Burnup taking three of the last four wickets to return figures of 3/22. Braund took 4/88. The South were 53/0 in reply by the end of the first day. Next day, Burnup and Abel took their first wicket stand to 122, Hayward made 106 in 180 minutes, and most of the other batsmen made useful contributions. Grace declared overnight, with Noble having taken 4/89. Next day the tourists made a good start. But after Duff was the first man out with the score at 102, Trumper stood almost alone, eventually being out for 120. Joe Vine took 7/31. With the pitch seemingly helping the spinners, Trumble and Armstrong shared the 22 overs that were possible in the South's second innings before time ran out. In the context of a run-chase, Armstrong did well to concede only 36 runs from his 11 overs, and took two wickets. Trumble had figures of 3/47.

=== 11–13 September: South v Australians ===
Australians (123 & 91) beat the South (87 & 66) by 61 runs

There was no play on the scheduled first day of this match at Dean Park Cricket Ground, Bournemouth, but with the highest of the four innings only totalling 123 there was still time for a positive result, the Australians getting revenge for their scare at Hastings against a South side that contained only three of the same players. Noble's 30 in the tourists' first innings was the highest score of the match. Fred Tate and Ted Arnold bowled unchanged in both Australian innings, Arnold taking 8/57 and 4/30 and Tate 2/61 and 6/48. At the close of the scheduled second day the South's first innings stood at 53/6, and when it ended the next morning Trumble had returned new career-best figures of 9/39, beating the 8/30 he had managed only a few weeks earlier. He took a further 6/29 in the second innings, only Fry (26) offering much resistance.

=== 15–17 September: Players v Australians ===
The Players (356 & 117/3) drew with Australians (414)

The tour's final match was at The Oval. A strong Players side won the toss, but had reached only 283/6 by the end of the first day, Hayward making 74, Tyldesley 56 and James Iremonger 66. When the innings was completed next day, Saunders had figures of 4/50. The Australians reached 208/2 in reply, 75 minutes being lost to rain, with Trumper scoring 96 and Hill on 79 not out. Hill was soon out next morning for 81 and there was a minor collapse to 233/5. But nearly 200 runs were added for the last five wickets, with Trumble making 68. Rhodes took 5/115. The tour ended on a note of anticlimax, with the home side playing out time in their second innings.

== Annual reviews ==
- Wisden Cricketers' Almanack 1903
