= English cricket team in Australia in 1901–02 =

International cricket tour

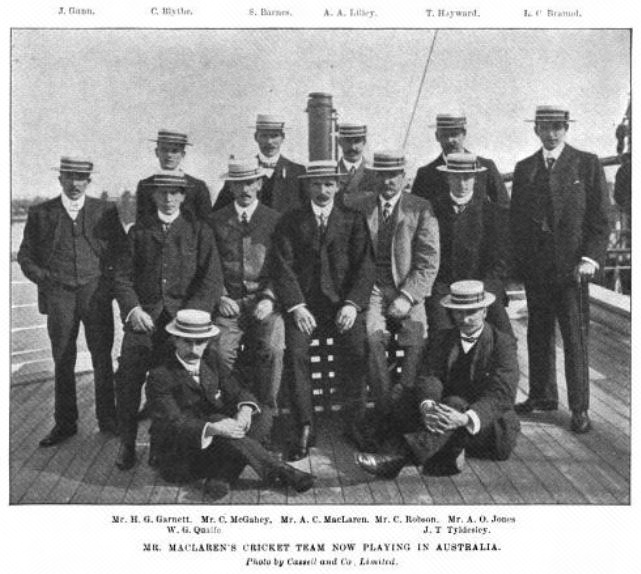

The English cricket team in Australia in 1901–02 lost the Test series to Australia, who came from one down to win 4–1 and thus retained The Ashes. The England side was a private venture of Archie MacLaren at the invitation of the Melbourne Cricket Club, after MCC had declined to send a team. Prior to this, all Test tours of Australia had been privately organised, but MCC took over the responsibility with the following tour in 1903–4. George Hirst, Wilfred Rhodes, KS Ranjitsinjhi, Stanley Jackson and CB Fry were all unavailable.

Only three centuries were scored in the series and only one team innings exceeded 400 (the first innings of England in the first Test). Clem Hill managed 521 runs at an average of 52.10, making successive scores of 99, 98 and 97, without scoring a century. England's most successful batsman was MacLaren, with 412 runs at 45.77.

Sydney Barnes made his debut for England and took 19 wickets in the first two Tests before being injured in the third and taking no further part in the series. His selection for the tour was something of a coup for MacLaren, as Barnes had very little first-class experience behind him: a total of seven games. He had been playing in the Lancashire League during the 1901 English season, but appeared in one game for Lancashire near the end of the season, taking 6/70 and 0/29. As a result of this performance MacLaren, who was the Lancashire captain, selected him for the touring party.

For Australia, Monty Noble and Hugh Trumble took 60 wickets between them.

== Test series summary ==
Match length: Timeless. Balls per over: 6.

Australia won the Test series 4–1.

=== First Test ===
13–16 December 1901
(Timeless Test)
Scorecard

England	v	Australia
464 (186 overs); AC MacLaren 116; CE McLeod 4/84 (44 overs)		168 (72.1 overs); SE Gregory 48; SF Barnes 5/65 (35.1 overs)
		172 (f/o) (57.4 overs); SE Gregory 43; LC Braund 5/61 (28.4 overs)

England won by an innings and 124 runs
Sydney Cricket Ground, Sydney
Umpires: R Callaway and RM Crockett

- England won the toss and elected to bat.
- 15 December was taken as a rest day
- LC Braund, JR Gunn, SF Barnes and C Blythe (all ENG) made their Test debuts.

=== Second Test ===
1–4 January 1902
(Timeless Test)
Scorecard

Australia	v	England
112 (32.1 overs); RA Duff 32; SF Barnes 6/42 (16.1 overs)		61 (15.4 overs); GL Jessop 27; MA Noble 7/17 (7.4 overs)
353 (156.2 overs); RA Duff 104; SF Barnes 7/121 (64 overs)		175 (79.5 overs); JT Tyldesley 66; MA Noble 6/60 (26 overs)

Australia won by 229 runs
Melbourne Cricket Ground, Melbourne
Umpires: R Callaway and RM Crockett

- England won the toss and elected to field.
- RA Duff and WW Armstrong (both AUS) made their Test debuts.

=== Third Test ===
17–23 January 1902
(Timeless Test)
Scorecard

England	v	Australia
388 (170 overs); LC Braund 103*; MA Noble 3/58 (26 overs)		321 (113 overs); C Hill 98; JR Gunn 5/76 (42 overs)
247 (111 overs); TW Hayward 47; H Trumble 6/74 (44 overs)		315/6 (134 overs); C Hill 97; JR Gunn 3/88 (38 overs)

Australia won by 4 wickets
Adelaide Oval, Adelaide
Umpires: P Argall and RM Crockett

- England won the toss and elected to bat.
- 19 January was taken as a rest day

=== Fourth Test ===
14–18 February 1902
(Timeless Test)
Scorecard

England	v	Australia
317 (138.2 overs); AC MacLaren 92; JV Saunders 4/119 (43 overs)		299 (139 overs); MA Noble 56; GL Jessop 4/68 (26 overs)
99 (48.1 overs); WG Quaife 15; GL Jessop 15; JV Saunders 5/43 (24.1 overs)		121/3 (36.3 overs); RA Duff 51*; JR Gunn 2/17 (8.3 overs)

Australia won by 7 wickets
Sydney Cricket Ground, Sydney
Umpires: C Bannerman and R Callaway

- England won the toss and elected to bat.
- 16 February was taken as a rest day.
- CP McGahey (ENG), and AJY Hopkins and JV Saunders (both AUS) made their Test debuts.

=== Fifth Test ===
28 February–4 March 1902
(Timeless Test)
Scorecard

Australia	v	England
144 (53 overs); C Hill 28; TW Hayward 4/22 (16 overs)		189 (67.3 overs); AFA Lilley 41; H Trumble 5/62 (25 overs)
255 (89.1 overs); C Hill 87; LC Braund 5/95 (26.1 overs)		178 (65.3 overs); AC MacLaren 49; MA Noble 6/98 (33 overs)

Australia won by 32 runs
Melbourne Cricket Ground, Melbourne
Umpires: C Bannerman and RM Crockett

- Australia won the toss and elected to bat.
- 2 March was taken as a rest day
- JPF Travers (AUS) made his Test debut.
