= Herbert Knutton =

English cricketer

Personal information
- Full name: Herbert John Knutton
- Born: 14 June 1867; Coventry, Warwickshire, England
- Died: 12 December 1946 (aged 79); Heaton, Yorkshire, England
- Nickname: Jack
- Batting: Right-handed
- Bowling: Right-arm fast

Domestic team information
- Years: Team
- 1894: Warwickshire

Career statistics
Competition	First-class
Matches	2
Runs scored	17
Batting average	5.66
100s/50s	0/0
Top score	8
Balls bowled	402
Wickets	10
Bowling average	17.80
5 wickets in innings	1
10 wickets in match	1
Best bowling	9/100
Catches/stumpings	0/–
- Source: Cricinfo, 14 May 2012

Herbert John Knutton (14 June 1867 – 12 December 1946) was an English cricketer. Knutton was a right-handed batsman who bowled right-arm fast. He was born at Coventry, Warwickshire.

Knutton made a single first-class appearance for Warwickshire against Nottinghamshire at Edgbaston in 1894. Nottinghamshire won the toss and elected to bat, making 238 in their first-innings, during which Knutton bowled twenty wicketless overs. Responding in their first-innings, Warwickshire made 248 all out, with Knutton being dismissed by Richard Hardstaff for 4 runs. In their second-innings, Nottinghamshire made 146 all out, during which he bowled six overs. Warwickshire reached 97/4 in their second-innings, at which point the match was declared a draw. It was in this same year that he first played in the Lancashire League for Enfield, making a single appearance for the club. The following season he also made another appearance for Enfield in the league, before making a third and final appearance for the club in 1903.

In 1902, Knutton had been playing in the Bradford League when he was selected to play a hastily arranged first-class fixture for an England XI (which contained one former Test player in Willie Quaife) against the touring Australians at Park Avenue, Bradford. The fixture had only come about after the Coronation of King Edward VII had been postponed after the King had developed appendicitis, allowing a fixture to be played on the day on which the King would have been crowned. Winning the toss and batting, the Australians made 402 all out in their first-innings. Knutton, who was the only fast bowler in the side, finished with figures of 9/100, taking the first eight Australian wickets to fall: Trumper, Noble, Hill, Darling, Hopkins, Duff, Armstrong, and Carter, before taking the final wicket, that of Saunders. The Australians were still able to amass a large total, mostly owing to Duff's 182. Responding in their first innings, the England XI made 240 all out, with Knutton being dismissed by Noble for 8 runs. Forced to follow-on, the England XI were dismissed for 203, with Knutton dismissed for 5, again by Noble. Requiring 41 for victory, the Australians reached their target with three wickets down, one of which (Darling's) fell to Knutton, who finished with match figures of 10/117. He never appeared in first-class cricket again, but did continue to play in the Bradford League, where he took more than a thousand wickets. However, his high, brisk bowling action was sometimes regarded as suspect.

Knutton worked outside of cricket as an athletic outfitter. He died at Heaton, Yorkshire, on 12 December 1946.
