= Albert Bird =

English cricketer

Personal information
- Full name: Albert Bird
- Born: 12 August 1867; Moseley, Warwickshire, England
- Died: 16 June 1927 (aged 59); Worcester, Worcestershire, England
- Batting: Right-handed
- Bowling: Right-arm off-break

Domestic team information
- Years: Team
- 1895–1909: Worcestershire

Career statistics
Competition	First-class
Matches	143
Runs scored	1,951
Batting average	12.04
100s/50s	–/2
Top score	64*
Balls bowled	15,731
Wickets	292
Bowling average	25.35
5 wickets in innings	20
10 wickets in match	3
Best bowling	7/41
Catches/stumpings	56/–
- Source: Cricinfo, 15 June 2022

Albert Bird (17 August 1867 – 16 June 1927) was an English cricketer: a right-arm off-break bowler and lower-order right-handed batsman who played for Worcestershire for the first ten years of their existence as a first-class county.

Born in Moseley, Birmingham, Bird was 31 by the time he played in his - and indeed Worcestershire's - first County Championship match, against Yorkshire in May 1899. He scored 14 and nought, and bowled eight overs without reward. He again went wicketless in his second match, against Sussex, and his third against Warwickshire was ruined by the weather. Bird finally broke his duck in his fourth game, when he bowled Oxford University's Lionel Collins for 42.

The years between 1901 and 1904 saw Bird's best performances, as he took around 50 wickets each summer, and claimed a total of 16 five-wicket hauls. These included an outstanding performance against Hampshire in 1901 when he took 7–53 in the first innings and 7–56 in the second for a match return of 14–109; as well as his career-best figures of 7-41, taken in 1903 against Oxford University. His only two first-class fifties were made in 1902 (64* against Lancashire), and in 1904 (63* against Yorkshire), and he passed a thousand runs in both 1903 and 1904.

1905 was a poor year for Bird as he could manage only eight wickets at over 32 runs apiece, and though in 1906 he took 35, from then onwards he gradually became less of a force in the Worcestershire team, playing his final game in July 1908 against Somerset. He died in Worcester at the age of 59.

Bird stood as umpire in one match: Worcestershire's game against Cambridge University in June 1903, although he was replaced by G Watts after the first day.

At the time of his death the Daily Mirror said that "in his day he was the shortest player in first-class cricket".
