= 1902 English cricket season =

1902 was the 13th season of County Championship cricket in England. Australia had won a classic Test series against England 2–1. The first two Tests were rained off but the final three were full of drama. Victor Trumper scored a century before lunch in the third Test, Australia won the fourth by just 3 runs and England won the fifth by one wicket following a century in 75 minutes by Gilbert Jessop. It was the 21st series between the two teams. Yorkshire won their third consecutive County Championship title and, as in 1901, went through the season with only one defeat.

== Honours ==
- County Championship - Yorkshire
- Minor Counties Championship - Wiltshire
- Wisden - Warwick Armstrong, Cuthbert Burnup, James Iremonger, James Kelly, Victor Trumper

== County Championship ==
=== Final table ===
The final County Championship table is shown below. One point was awarded for a win, none for a draw, and minus one for a loss. Positions were decided on percentage of points over completed games.

County Championship 1902 - Final Standings
	Team	P	W	L	D	A	Pts	GC^{1}	Pts/GC (as %)
1	Yorkshire	26	13	1	11	1	12	14	85.71
2	Sussex	24	7	3	14	0	4	10	40.00
3	Nottinghamshire	20	6	3	11	0	3	9	33.33
4	Surrey	28	8	5	15	0	3	13	23.08
5	Lancashire	24	7	5	11	1	2	12	16.67
6	Warwickshire	18	6	5	7	0	1	11	9.09
=7	Kent	22	8	8	6	0	0	16	0.00
=7	Somerset	18	7	7	4	0	0	14	0.00
9	Worcestershire	22	5	6	11	0	-1	11	-9.09
10	Derbyshire	16	4	5	7	0	-1	9	-11.11
11	Leicestershire	20	2	4	13	1	-2	6	-33.33
12	Middlesex	18	3	7	7	1	-4	10	-40.00
13	Essex	20	2	5	13	0	-3	7	-42.86
14	Gloucestershire	20	3	9	8	0	-6	12	-50.00
15	Hampshire	16	2	10	4	0	-8	12	-66.67

- ^{1} Games completed

Points system:

- 1 for a win
- 0 for a draw, a tie or an abandoned match
- -1 for a loss

=== Most runs in the County Championship ===
1902 County Championship - leading batsmen
Name	Team	Matches	Runs	Average	100s	50s
Bobby Abel	Surrey	26	1570	47.57	7	1
Cuthbert Burnup	Kent	22	1349	40.87	3	10
Johnny Tyldesley	Lancashire	20	1291	44.51	3	8
Tom Taylor	Yorkshire	22	1276	45.57	4	8
Arthur Shrewsbury	Nottinghamshire	20	1153	52.40	4	6

=== Most wickets in the County Championship ===
1902 County Championship - leading bowlers
Name	Team	Matches	Balls bowled	Wickets taken	Average
Fred Tate	Sussex	20	5846	153	14.28
Wilfred Rhodes	Yorkshire	22	5260	140	12.48
Thomas Wass	Nottinghamshire	19	4625	138	15.32
Schofield Haigh	Yorkshire	25	3652	123	11.99
Beaumont Cranfield	Somerset	18	4131	115	17.15

== Ashes tour ==
In the 1967 Wisden Cricketer's Almanack, A. A. Thomson described this series as "a rubber more exciting than any in history except the Australia v West Indies series in 1960–61". This description came despite the fact that Australia had secured the series after four of five matches, leading 2–0 before the final Test; the first two matches had been drawn due to rain, with the second match at Lord's yielding only 38 overs in three days.

The third Test, the only one ever to be played at Bramall Lane, saw Australia win by 143 runs, following a brilliant century by Victor Trumper before lunch on the first day. In the fourth Test Australia won by three runs, despite 11 wickets from recalled bowler Bill Lockwood. It came down to Fred Tate and Wilfred Rhodes needing to hit eight runs. Tate hit a four, but was bowled by Jack Saunders with the fourth ball of his over. England came back to win the final Test, conceding a first-innings deficit of 141, then going to 48 for five needing 263 to win, before Gilbert Jessop hit a hundred in 75 minutes and England won by one wicket.

Trumper made a great impression on those who saw him bat. Harry Altham wrote: "From start to finish of the season, on every sort of wicket, against every sort of bowling, Trumper entranced the eye, inspired his team, demoralized his enemies, and made run-getting appear the easiest thing in the world."

Cumulative record - Test wins	1876–1902
England	28
Australia	26
Drawn	12

== Overall first-class statistics ==
=== Leading batsmen ===
1902 English cricket season - most runs
Name	Team(s)	Matches	Runs	Average	100s	50s
Victor Trumper	Australians	36	2570	48.49	11	11
Bobby Abel	England, Players, South of England, Surrey	41	2299	41.05	9	3
Cuthbert Burnup	Gentlemen, Kent, MCC, South of England	33	2048	39.38	6	11
Johnny Tyldesley	England, Lancashire, Players	34	1934	40.29	4	13
Tom Hayward	England, Players, South of England, Surrey	37	1737	32.77	3	9

=== Leading bowlers ===
1902 English cricket season - most wickets
Name	Team(s)	Matches	Balls bowled	Wickets taken	Average
Wilfred Rhodes	England, Players, Yorkshire	37	7845	213	13.15
Fred Tate	England, Players, South of England, Sussex	27	7100	180	15.71
Len Braund	England, London County, MCC, Players, Somerset, South of England	33	6600	172	19.80
Charles Llewellyn	Hampshire, London County, Players	26	6784	170	18.61
Schofield Haigh	Players, Yorkshire	34	4794	158	12.55

== Annual reviews ==
- Wisden Cricketers' Almanack 1903
