= 1903 English cricket season =

1903 was the 14th season of County Championship cricket in England. Middlesex won their first title, winning eight and losing one of their 18 games. Yorkshire, the defending champions, finished third after losing five games. Yorkshire was the only team to defeat Middlesex – at Headingley in August, Yorkshire bowled Middlesex out for 79 in the first innings, and recorded a 230-run win.

== Honours ==
- County Championship – Middlesex
- Minor Counties Championship – Northamptonshire
- Wisden – Colin Blythe, John Gunn, Albert Knight, Walter Mead, Plum Warner

== County Championship ==
=== Final table ===
The final County Championship table is shown below. One point was awarded for a win, none for a draw, and minus one for a loss. Positions were decided on percentage of points over completed games.

County Championship 1903 – Final Standings
	Team	P	W	L	D	A	Pts	GC^{1}	Pts/GC (as %)
1	Middlesex	18	8	1	7	1	7	9	77.78
2	Sussex	24	7	3	14	0	4	10	40.00
3	Yorkshire	26	13	5	8	0	8	18	44.44
4	Lancashire	26	10	5	11	0	5	15	33.33
5	Nottinghamshire	20	6	4	10	0	2	10	20.00
6	Worcestershire	20	8	6	6	0	2	14	14.29
7	Warwickshire	18	5	4	9	0	1	11	9.09
=8	Kent	22	7	6	7	2	1	13	7.69
=8	Essex	22	7	6	7	2	1	13	7.69
10	Somerset	18	6	6	5	1	0	12	0.00
11	Surrey	28	7	11	9	1	−4	18	−22.22
12	Derbyshire	16	4	7	5	0	−3	11	−27.27
13	Gloucestershire	20	3	10	7	0	−7	13	−53.85
=14	Hampshire	18	1	10	4	3	−9	11	−81.82
=14	Leicestershire	20	1	10	9	0	−9	11	−81.82

- ^{1} Games completed

Points system:

- 1 for a win
- 0 for a draw, a tie or an abandoned match
- -1 for a loss

=== Most runs in the County Championship ===
1903 County Championship – leading batsmen
Name	Team	Matches	Runs	Average	100s	50s
C. B. Fry	Sussex	23	2413	80.43	8	8
Johnny Tyldesley	Lancashire	23	1618	44.94	2	10
Archie MacLaren	Lancashire	26	1565	40.12	3	9
Ernie Hayes	Surrey	26	1449	34.50	3	8
Percy Perrin	Essex	20	1428	44.62	4	6

=== Most wickets in the County Championship ===
1903 County Championship – leading bowlers
Name	Team	Matches	Balls bowled	Wickets taken	Average
Wilfred Rhodes	Yorkshire	26	6370	143	14.72
Colin Blythe	Kent	20	5210	137	13.05
Sydney Barnes	Lancashire	23	6138	131	17.85
Sam Hargreave	Warwickshire	17	4481	123	12.17
George Herbert Hirst	Yorkshire	23	3875	118	12.79

== Philadelphians tour ==
Percy Clark and Bart King headed the wickets for the Philadelphians, who played 14 first-class matches in England, in addition to an abandoned fixture with Sussex. The American tourists won as many matches as they lost, with six of each, and drew two. Clark upstaged King, passing him on the wicket-taking tally with a pair of five wicket hauls in the final 110-run win over Surrey where King got six wickets. King averaged four runs less per wicket, however, and also contributed with 614 runs, the third-most in the team. In the batting, they were headed by captain John Lester, who made 786 runs in 13 matches.

== Overall first-class statistics ==
=== Leading batsmen ===
1903 English cricket season – leading batsmen
Name	Team(s)	Matches	Runs	Average	100s	50s
C. B. Fry	Gentlemen, Sussex	25	2683	81.30	9	8
Tom Hayward	Players, Surrey	38	2177	35.68	3	12
Johnny Tyldesley	Lancashire, Players	28	1955	44.43	2	13
Ranjitsinhji	Gentlemen, London County, MCC, Sussex	28	1924	56.58	5	12
Archie MacLaren	Gentlemen, Lancashire	30	1886	42.86	4	11

=== Leading bowlers ===
1903 English cricket season – leading bowlers
Name	Team(s)	Matches	Balls bowled	Wickets taken	Average
Wilfred Rhodes	Players, Yorkshire	36	8268	193	14.57
Ted Arnold	Players, Worcestershire	26	6314	143	17.44
Colin Blythe	Kent	22	5554	142	13.75
Sam Hargreave	Players, Warwickshire	21	5537	134	14.02
Len Braund	London County, MCC, Players, Somerset, South of England	30	5736	134	21.01

== Annual reviews ==
- Wisden Cricketers' Almanack 1904
