= 1901 English cricket season =

1901 was the 12th season of County Championship cricket in England. Yorkshire defended their title but, unlike the previous year when they were unbeaten, they lost one game during the season to 12th-placed Somerset.

Middlesex finished second, winning six of their eight finished games, but had the highest percentage of draws of anyone save Essex. Once again, Ranjitsinhji scored more than 2,000 runs for Sussex and, with 2,000 runs from C. B. Fry as well, the team finished fourth in the table behind third-placed Lancashire, whose England Test batsman Johnny Tyldesley scored 2,605 runs.

== Honours ==
- County Championship – Yorkshire
- Minor Counties Championship – Durham
- Wisden – Len Braund, Charlie McGahey, Frank Mitchell, Willie Quaife, Johnny Tyldesley

== South African tour ==
South Africa made its second tour of England in 1901, following the inaugural tour in 1894. This time, the team played first-class cricket, mainly against county opposition, but no Test matches.

South Africa played 15 first-class games with 5 wins, 9 defeats and 1 tied match. Their overall record was 25 matches, 13 wins, 9 defeats, 2 draws and 1 tied match.

== County Championship ==
=== Final table ===
The final County Championship table is shown below. One point was awarded for a win, none for a draw, and minus one for a loss. Positions were decided on percentage of points over completed games.

County Championship 1901 - Final Standings
	Team	P	W	L	D	A	Pts	GC^{1}	Pts/GC (as %)
1	Yorkshire	28	20	1	6	1	19	21	90.48
2	Middlesex	18	6	2	10	0	4	8	50.00
3	Lancashire	28	11	5	12	0	6	16	37.50
4	Sussex	24	8	4	12	0	4	12	33.33
5	Warwickshire	16	7	4	5	0	3	11	27.27
6	Surrey	28	7	6	14	1	1	13	7.69
=7	Hampshire	18	6	6	6	0	0	12	0.00
=7	Kent	22	7	7	7	1	0	14	0.00
9	Nottinghamshire	20	5	6	8	1	-1	11	-9.09
10	Essex	22	4	5	12	1	-1	9	-11.11
11	Worcestershire	22	7	10	4	1	-3	17	-17.65
=12	Leicestershire	20	4	10	5	1	-6	14	-42.86
=12	Somerset	18	4	10	3	1	-6	14	-42.86
14	Gloucestershire	24	3	10	11	0	-7	13	-53.85
15	Derbyshire	20	0	13	7	0	-13	13	-100.00

- ^{1} Games completed

Points system:

- 1 for a win
- 0 for a draw, a tie or an abandoned match
- -1 for a loss

=== Most runs in the County Championship ===
1901 County Championship - leading batsmen
Name	Team	Matches	Runs	Average	100s	50s
Johnny Tyldesley	Lancashire	28	2605	60.58	8	13
C. B. Fry	Sussex	23	2382	74.43	9	10
Bobby Abel	Surrey	27	2264	50.31	5	14
Ranjitsinhji	Sussex	21	2067	76.55	7	8
Tom Hayward	Surrey	25	2039	58.25	2	17

=== Most wickets in the County Championship ===
1901 County Championship - leading bowlers
Name	Team	Matches	Balls bowled	Wickets taken	Average
Wilfred Rhodes	Yorkshire	27	6934	196	13.59
George Hirst	Yorkshire	27	5093	135	16.75
Fred Tate	Sussex	24	6055	126	20.00
Frederick Roberts	Gloucestershire	22	5700	118	22.56
Charles Llewellyn	Hampshire	18	5460	115	23.25
Tom Richardson	Surrey	24	5726	115	23.65

== Overall first-class statistics ==
=== Leading batsmen ===
1901 English cricket season - leading batsmen
Name	Team(s)	Matches	Runs	Average	100s	50s
Bobby Abel	England, Players, Surrey	38	3309	55.15	7	21
C.B. Fry	Gentlemen, London County, Sussex	29	3147	78.67	13	10
Johnny Tyldesley	England, Lancashire, Players, Under 30s	35	3041	55.29	9	14
Tom Hayward	England, Players, Surrey	36	2535	50.70	2	21
Ranjitsinhji	England, Gentlemen, London County, MCC, Sussex	27	2468	70.51	8	10

=== Leading bowlers ===
1901 English cricket season - leading bowlers
Name	Team(s)	Matches	Balls bowled	Wickets taken	Average
Wilfred Rhodes	Players, Under 30s, Yorkshire	37	9391	251	15.12
George Hirst	Players, Under 30s, Yorkshire	36	6813	183	16.38
Albert Trott	MCC, Middlesex, Players	29	7735	176	21.78
Tom Richardson	Surrey	32	7762	159	23.25
Fred Tate	Sussex	27	6814	142	19.50

== Annual reviews ==
- Wisden Cricketers' Almanack 1902
