= Arthur Woodcock =

English cricketer (1865–1910)

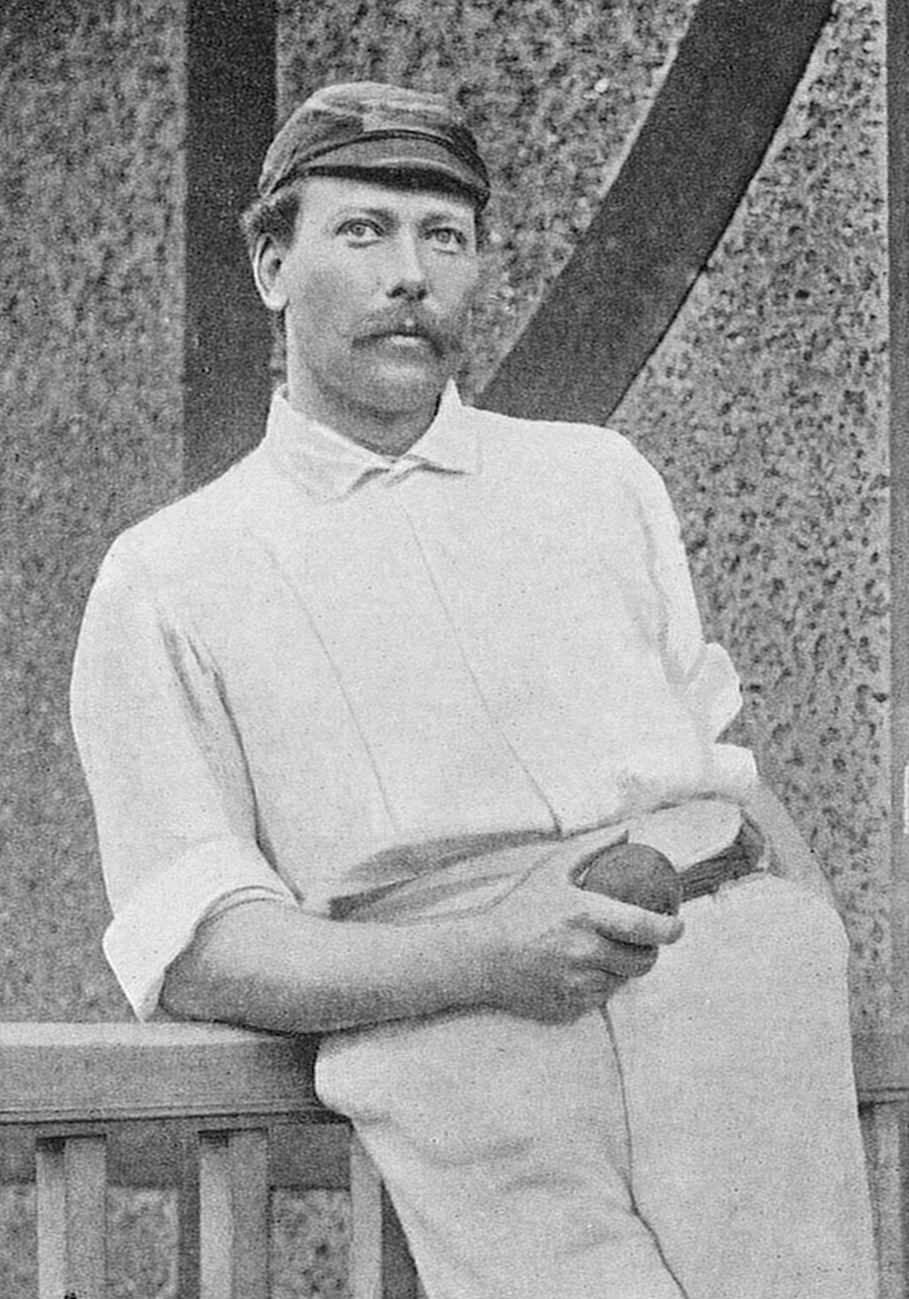

Personal information
- Born: 23 September 1865; Northampton, Northamptonshire, England
- Died: 14 May 1910 (aged 44); Billesdon, Leicestershire, England
- Batting: Right-handed
- Bowling: Right-arm fast

Domestic team information
- Years: Team
- 1894–1908: Leicestershire
- 1895–1901: MCC
- 1900: London County

Career statistics
Competition	First-class
Matches	137
Runs scored	1,547
Batting average	8.31
100s/50s	0/1
Top score	62
Balls bowled	23,446
Wickets	548
Bowling average	25.90
5 wickets in innings	38
10 wickets in match	9
Best bowling	9/28
Catches/stumpings	35/–
- Source: CricketArchive, 6 November 2012

Arthur Woodcock (23 September 1865 – 14 May 1910) was an English cricketer who played in 121 first-class matches for Leicestershire from 1894 to 1908 and appeared for London County in 1900.

During the late 1890s Arthur Woodcock was regarded as the second-fastest bowler in England, shaded only by Charles Kortright. His 548 wickets at 22.28 included 102 in 1895 and 9 for 28 against MCC at Lord's in 1899. A right-handed tail-ender, he averaged 8.31 with a top score of 62 not out. In 1906 he umpired first-class matches.

Woodcock died at Billesdon in Leicestershire from "self-administered poison" on 14 May 1910.
