= Charlie McGahey =

English cricketer (1871–1935)

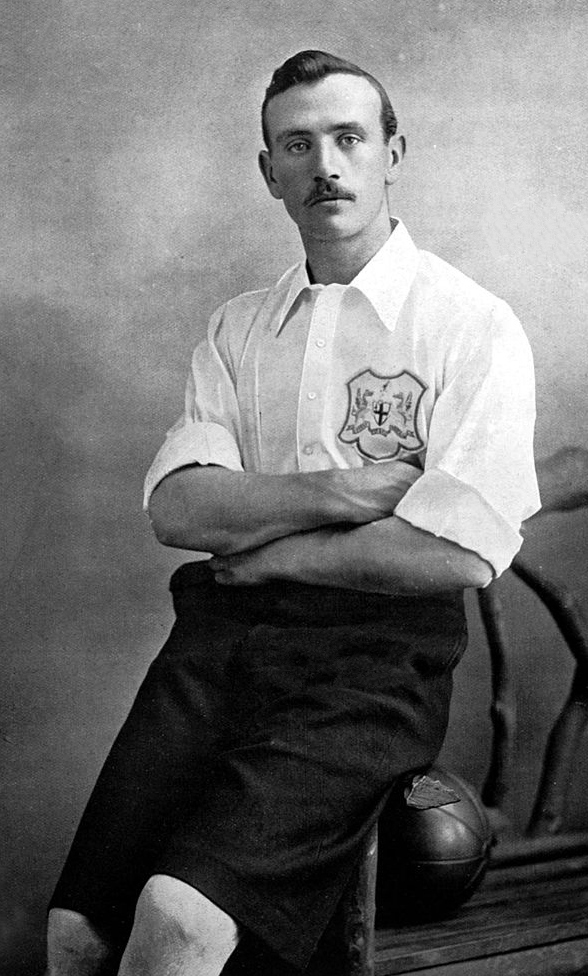

Personal information
- Born: 12 February 1871; Stepney, London, England
- Died: 10 January 1935 (aged 63); Whipps Cross, Leytonstone, Essex, England
- Batting: Right-handed
- Bowling: Legbreak

International information
- National side: England
- Test debut: 14 February 1902 v Australia
- Last Test: 4 March 1902 v Australia

Career statistics
Competition	Test	First-class
Matches	2	437
Runs scored	38	20,723
Batting average	9.50	30.20
100s/50s	0/0	31/106
Top score	18	277
Balls bowled	–	19,486
Wickets	–	330
Bowling average	–	31.21
5 wickets in innings	–	12
10 wickets in match	–	3
Best bowling	–	7/27
Catches/stumpings	1/–	151/–
- Source: CricInfo, 6 November 2022

Charles Percy McGahey (12 February 1871 – 10 January 1935) was an English cricketer who played first-class cricket for Essex between 1894 and 1921. McGahey also played for London County between 1901 and 1904 and was named as one of the Wisden Cricketers of the Year in 1902. McGahey played two Test matches for England during Archie MacLaren's tour of Australia in 1901-02.

McGahey played association football for Clapton, one of the leading amateur clubs of the day.

McGahey died from sepsis in a finger, which he damaged after slipping on a wet pavement.
