= Dick Lilley =

English cricketer (1866–1929)

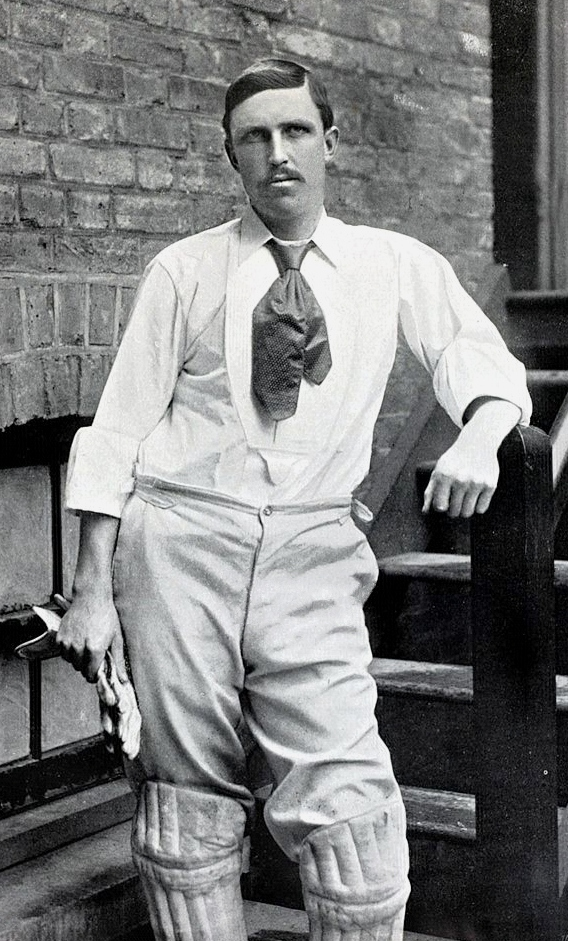
- Dick Lilley, c. 1895

Personal information
- Full name: Arthur Frederick Augustus Lilley
- Born: 28 November 1866; Holloway Head, Birmingham
- Died: 17 November 1929 (aged 62); Brislington, Bristol
- Batting: Right-handed
- Bowling: Right-arm medium pace
- Role: Wicket-keeper

International information
- National side: England
- Test debut (cap 104): 22 June 1896 v Australia
- Last Test: 9 August 1909 v Australia

Domestic team information
- Years: Team
- 1888–1911: Warwickshire
- 1891–1908: North
- 1895–1909: Players

Career statistics
Competition	Test	First-class
Matches	35	416
Runs scored	903	15,597
Batting average	20.52	26.30
100s/50s	0/4	16/77
Top score	84	171
Balls bowled	25	2,323
Wickets	1	41
Bowling average	23.00	36.21
5 wickets in innings	0	1
10 wickets in match	0	0
Best bowling	1/23	6/46
Catches/stumpings	70/22	714/197
- Source: CricketArchive, 16 September 2022

Arthur Frederick Augustus Lilley (28 November 1866 – 17 November 1929), variously known as Dick Lilley or A. A. Lilley, was an English professional cricketer who played for Warwickshire County Cricket Club from 1888 to 1911, and in 35 Test matches for England from 1896 to 1909. He was born in Holloway Head, Birmingham, and died in Brislington, Bristol.

Lilley was a wicket-keeper who completed 714 catches and 197 stumpings in 416 first-class matches. As a right-handed batsman, he scored 15,597 career runs at an average of 26.30 runs per completed innings with a highest score of 171 as one of sixteen centuries. He was an occasional right-arm medium pace bowler and took 41 first-class wickets with a best return of 6/46, which was the only time he took five wickets in an innings.

== Career ==
=== Second-class debut ===
Playing as the wicket-keeper, Lilley made his debut for Warwickshire County Cricket Club in 1888, seven years before they joined the County Championship to become a first-class team, and played for them continuously until 1911. His debut was against the touring Australians in a two-day match played 11–12 May 1888 at Edgbaston. The Australians won by an innings and 150 runs but Lilley had the satisfaction of stumping both Harry Trott and George Bonnor. He batted at number 7 in the order, scoring 0 and 10.

=== First-class debut ===
Lilley did not make his first-class debut until June 1891. Warwickshire were still a second-class county team at that time but Lilley had already established a good reputation and he was chosen to represent the North in a North v South match at Edgbaston from 29 June to 1 July 1891. Batting at number 11, he scored 44 and, in the South's first innings, he completed two catches and one stumping. His first dismissal in first-class cricket was none other than W. G. Grace, whom Lilley caught for 7 off the bowling of William Attewell. The match was drawn after each side had played only one innings each, a downpour causing its abandonment.

=== County Championship debut ===
Warwickshire joined the County Championship in the 1895 season, the sixth edition of the competition. Their first match was against Essex at Edgbaston on 6–8 May. Lilley was in the team so the match was also his championship debut. The match was a high-scoring draw. Essex won the toss and chose to bat first on a pitch that was "much improved by recent fine weather". They reached 350/5 at close of play on the 6th and went on to 410 all out. Lilley did not complete any catches or stumpings. Warwickshire were all out for 259 and were obliged to follow on. The highlight of their innings was a fourth wicket partnership of 144 by Lilley (82) and Walter Quaife (91). This was Lilley's highest first-class score at the time. Fast bowler Charles Kortright was outstanding for Essex, taking 8/94 including Lilley who was trapped lbw. At the close, Warwickshire were 28/1, still 123 behind. They batted through the final day to reach 344/5 and salvage a draw. Team captain Herbert Bainbridge led the defence with 111 and Lilley scored 34 before he was bowled by Walter Mead.

In his second Championship match a week later, Lilley scored 139 in Warwickshire's first innings total of 305 against Derbyshire at Edgbaston. This was his first century in both the County Championship and first-class cricket. The result was another draw: Warwickshire 305 and 239/7 declared; Derbyshire 234 and 197/3.

=== Test debut ===
Lilley made his Test debut against Australia at Lord's in the first match of the 1896 series and went on to play in 35 Tests until 1909. His debut match was played 22–24 June and England won by 6 wickets. Lilley took four catches in the match, his first Test victim being George Giffen who was out for 0 facing George Lohmann. Australia had batted first and were all out for only 53; England replied with 292 all out but Lilley was bowled for 0 by Charles Eady. Australia recovered in their second innings to score 347, leaving England with a target of 109. They scored 111/4; Lilley did not bat.

=== Cricketer of the Year ===
For his performances in 1896, Lilley was chosen as a Wisden Cricketer of the Year in 1897 and was described as "far and away the greatest cricketer Warwickshire has yet produced". Wisden said Lilley had no superior as a wicket-keeper against slow and medium pace bowling, but they criticised his strategy of standing back to fast bowling and commented: "he cannot be placed on quite the same level as Blackham, Mr McGregor, or the late Richard Pilling". In fact, Lilley began standing back on the advice of W. G. Grace who, on seeing him standing up to Tom Richardson, the England fast bowler, suggested that he would "do better by standing back", which Lilley did for the rest of his career.

== Retirement ==
Lilley last played for Warwickshire in July 1911, retiring in "early August" and the county went on to win the championship that year. His place was taken by Tiger Smith who played for Warwickshire until 1930.

After his retirement, Lilley settled in Bristol and was a member of the special advisory committee which helped to re-establish Gloucestershire County Cricket Club after the Great War. In his Wisden obituary, his date of birth was given as 18 November 1867, but that was an error. Wisden said he died the day before his 62nd birthday; in fact, he was born on 28 November 1866 and was nearly 63 when he died on 17 November 1929 at his home in Brislington.

== Legacy ==
Lilley's Wisden obituary praised his consistency as a wicket-keeper and his reliability as a catcher. He was, they said, "so pronounced an artist that at the end of his career his hands and fingers showed scarcely a trace of the heavy strain to which they had been subjected in taking bowling of all descriptions". Lilley was renowned as "an exceptionally fine judge of cricket" and his team captains often consulted him during matches. Pelham Warner said of him: "He was a most admirable and level-headed judge of the game, and his advice on critical occasions was almost invariably sought by a long succession of England captains".

== Sources ==
- Lilley, A. A. (1914). Twenty-four years of cricket. London: Mills and Boon.
