= 1904 English cricket season =

1904 was the 15th season of County Championship cricket in England. Lancashire went through the season unbeaten and clinched the Championship title. Lancashire drew ten games, but their 16 wins were still more than any other team could muster. Defending champions Middlesex fell to fourth place, losing two successive matches to Kent and Nottinghamshire in June to have a negative percentage five games into the season. They did eventually win nine games, though, which was enough to take them past everyone bar Yorkshire and Kent. Yorkshire were two losses from sharing the Championship with Lancashire, and drew with the Champions on both occasions; despite Lancashire following on in their match at Headingley, Johnny Tyldesley made an unbeaten century from number three to draw the game. However, even a win in this match could not have given Yorkshire the title.

== Honours ==
- County Championship - Lancashire
- Minor Counties Championship - Northamptonshire
- Wisden - Bernard Bosanquet, Ernest Halliwell, James Hallows, Percy Perrin, Reggie Spooner

== County Championship ==
=== Final table ===
The final County Championship table is shown below. One point was awarded for a win, none for a draw, and minus one for a loss. Positions were decided on percentage of points over completed games.

County Championship 1904 - Final Standings
| | Team | P | W | L | D | A | Pts | GC^{1} | Pts/GC (as %) |
|---|---|---|---|---|---|---|---|---|---|
| 1 | Lancashire | 26 | 16 | 0 | 10 | 0 | 16 | 16 | 100.00 |
| 2 | Yorkshire | 27 | 9 | 2 | 16 | 0 | 7 | 11 | 63.64 |
| 3 | Kent | 21 | 10 | 4 | 7 | 0 | 6 | 14 | 42.86 |
| 4 | Middlesex | 18 | 9 | 4 | 5 | 0 | 5 | 13 | 38.46 |
| 5 | Nottinghamshire | 20 | 7 | 4 | 9 | 0 | 3 | 11 | 27.27 |
| 6 | Sussex | 24 | 5 | 4 | 15 | 0 | 1 | 9 | 11.11 |
| =7 | Leicestershire | 20 | 6 | 6 | 8 | 0 | 0 | 12 | 0.00 |
| =7 | Warwickshire | 16 | 5 | 5 | 6 | 0 | 0 | 10 | 0.00 |
| 9 | Gloucestershire | 18 | 5 | 6 | 7 | 0 | -1 | 11 | -9.09 |
| 10 | Derbyshire | 18 | 5 | 8 | 5 | 0 | -3 | 13 | -23.08 |
| 11 | Surrey | 28 | 6 | 12 | 10 | 0 | -6 | 18 | -33.33 |
| 12 | Somerset | 18 | 5 | 11 | 2 | 0 | -6 | 16 | -37.50 |
| 13 | Worcestershire | 18 | 3 | 8 | 7 | 0 | -5 | 11 | -45.45 |
| 14 | Essex | 20 | 3 | 10 | 7 | 0 | -7 | 13 | -53.85 |
| 15 | Hampshire | 18 | 2 | 12 | 4 | 0 | -10 | 14 | -71.43 |

- ^{1} Games completed

Points system:

- 1 for a win
- 0 for a draw, a tie or an abandoned match
- -1 for a loss

=== Most runs in the County Championship ===
1904 County Championship - leading batsmen
| Name | Team | Matches | Runs | Average | 100s | 50s |
|---|---|---|---|---|---|---|
| C. B. Fry | Sussex | 23 | 2376 | 79.20 | 9 | 4 |
| Johnny Tyldesley | Lancashire | 25 | 2237 | 69.90 | 8 | 7 |
| Tom Hayward | Surrey | 26 | 2074 | 50.58 | 7 | 9 |
| George Herbert Hirst | Yorkshire | 27 | 1848 | 51.33 | 6 | 8 |
| James Iremonger | Nottinghamshire | 19 | 1812 | 60.40 | 5 | 8 |

=== Most wickets in the County Championship ===
1904 County Championship - leading bowlers
| Name | Team | Matches | Balls bowled | Wickets taken | Average |
|---|---|---|---|---|---|
| Edward Dennett | Gloucestershire | 18 | 5901 | 123 | 19.36 |
| Colin Blythe | Kent | 21 | 5385 | 121 | 19.38 |
| George Cox | Sussex | 23 | 6564 | 112 | 23.50 |
| James Hallows | Lancashire | 24 | 5319 | 108 | 18.71 |
| Bill Reeves | Essex | 20 | 5176 | 106 | 26.16 |

== South Africans tour ==
The South Africans toured England during the season, playing 22 matches. Most of them were against regular first-class teams, but there were also matches against an England XI (with five players who had already played Test cricket), against Marylebone Cricket Club (with two Test players) and a South of England team with five Test players. The tourists won ten of their 22 matches, and lost two, against Worcestershire and Kent. They did not manage to beat any of the top four teams in the Championship, though; they drew with Lancashire and Yorkshire (twice), lost to Kent and tied with Middlesex. Frank Mitchell, the South Africans' captain, also played first class cricket for Yorkshire during the season, which helped him score more than 1,000 first class runs in the season. 839 of those were made for South Africa; Louis Tancred (1217) and Maitland Hathorn were the two players to make more than 1,000 runs for South Africa only. In bowling, pace bowler Johannes Kotze headed the attack, claiming 104 wickets in his 22 matches for South Africa.

== Overall first-class statistics ==
=== Leading batsmen ===
1904 English cricket season - leading batsmen
| Name | Team(s) | Matches | Runs | Average | 100s | 50s |
|---|---|---|---|---|---|---|
| Tom Hayward | Players, South of England, Surrey | 36 | 3170 | 54.65 | 11 | 11 |
| C. B. Fry | Gentlemen, Gentlemen of England, Sussex | 29 | 2824 | 70.60 | 10 | 6 |
| George Herbert Hirst | North of England, Yorkshire | 36 | 2501 | 54.36 | 9 | 10 |
| Johnny Tyldesley | Lancashire, North of England | 30 | 2439 | 62.53 | 8 | 9 |
| David Denton | North of England, Players, Yorkshire | 36 | 2088 | 40.15 | 3 | 15 |

=== Leading bowlers ===
1904 English cricket season - leading bowlers
| Name | Team(s) | Matches | Balls bowled | Wickets taken | Average |
|---|---|---|---|---|---|
| J. T. Hearne | England XI, MCC, Middlesex, Players, South of England | 32 | 6921 | 145 | 18.84 |
| Colin Blythe | Kent, South of England | 24 | 6146 | 138 | 19.60 |
| George Herbert Hirst | North of England, Yorkshire | 36 | 6198 | 132 | 21.09 |
| Bernard Bosanquet | Gentlemen, MCC, Middlesex, I Zingari, South of England | 27 | 4363 | 132 | 21.62 |
| Wilfred Rhodes | North of England, Players, Yorkshire | 36 | 7184 | 131 | 21.59 |
