= Charles Richardson (umpire) =

English cricketer and umpire

Charles Edward Richardson (1853 - 26 February 1925) was an English cricketer and Test match umpire.

Richardson was born in England. He played as a batsman and bowler in 14 matches for Leicestershire from 1875 to 1888, before it was a first-class county, including several with more than eleven Leicestershire players.

He stood as umpire in County Championship matches from 1897 to 1914 and officiated the Gentlemen v Players match at the Oval in July 1914. Richardson also umpired two Test matches in 1902. His final appearance as an umpire was in 1923. He died in Leicester in 1925.
