= Ernest Smith (cricketer, born 1869) =

English cricketer

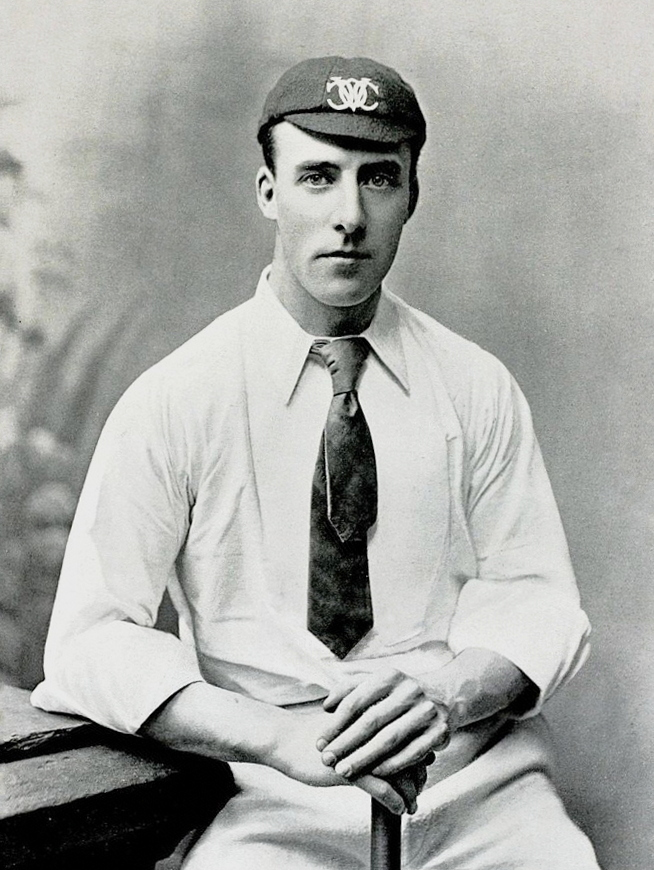

Personal information
- Born: 19 October 1869; Morley, West Riding of Yorkshire, England
- Died: 9 April 1945 (aged 75); Eastbourne, Sussex, England
- Height: 6 ft 1 in (1.85 m)
- Batting: Right-handed
- Bowling: Right-arm fast
- Relatives: A. E. Smith (brother)

Domestic team information
- Years: Team
- 1888–1891: Oxford University
- 1888–1907: Yorkshire County Cricket Club
- 1892–1902: Marylebone Cricket Club

Career statistics
Competition	First-class
Matches	242
Runs scored	7686
Batting average	21.46
100s/50s	6/22
Top score	164
Balls bowled	22774
Wickets	454
Bowling average	25.69
5 wickets in innings	22
10 wickets in match	3
Best bowling	7/40
Catches/stumpings	174/0
- Source: Ernest Smith. Cricinfo

Ernest Smith (19 October 1869 – 9 April 1945) was an English amateur first-class cricketer, who played twenty one games for Oxford University from 1888 to 1891, 154 matches for Yorkshire County Cricket Club from 1888 to 1907, and four for the Marylebone Cricket Club (MCC) from 1892 to 1902.

Smith was born in Morley, West Riding of Yorkshire, and educated at Clifton College and University College, Oxford. In a first-class career that lasted from 1888, when he was 18, till 1928, when he was 58, he also played cricket for Oxford and Cambridge Universities Past and Present (1890), fifteen matches for The Gentlemen (1891–1906), North of England (1891–1908), Gentlemen of England (1891–1910) and C. I. Thornton's XI (1892–1899) and, among other teams, twenty-seven games for H. D. G. Leveson-Gower's XI (1909–1928).

In 242 first-class matches, Smith scored 7,686 runs at 21.46, with a highest score of 164 not out for H. D. G. Leveson-Gower's XI against Cambridge University in 1912. In 1891 he scored 154 for North against South, he and Charles de Trafford adding 254 in 105 minutes. A right-arm fast bowler, Smith took 454 wickets at 25.69, with a best return of 7 for 40 for Yorkshire against MCC in 1893. For Oxford University in 1890 he took 13 for 146 in the match against Lancashire. Standing six feet one inch tall, he was also a good fieldsman.

Smith was a schoolteacher who played most of his cricket during the summer school holidays. In 1958 A. A. Thomson said of him: "Ernest was one of that devoted band of August schoolmasters – happily they survive to-day – who pack their boys off home and add a kind of academic gaiety to the month's cricket." He added that Smith could "defend like a lowered portcullis if Yorkshire were in serious trouble" or bat "like a charging cavalry leader".

Smith died in April 1945 in Eastbourne, Sussex. His brother, A. E. Smith, played one first-class game for the "English Residents" in Philadelphia in 1890.
