= Fred Tate =

English cricketer

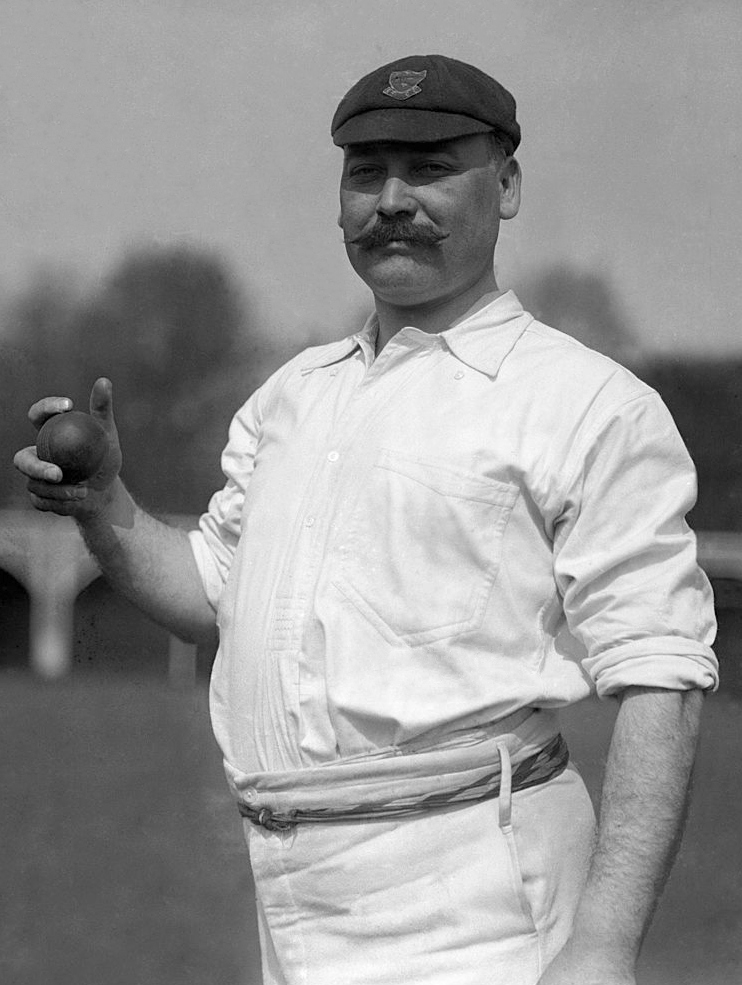
- Tate in about 1905

Personal information
- Born: 24 July 1867; Brighton, Sussex, England
- Died: 24 February 1943 (aged 75); Burgess Hill, Sussex, England
- Batting: Right-handed
- Bowling: Right-arm medium

International information
- National side: England
- Only Test: 24 July 1902 v Australia

Career statistics
Competition	Test	First-class
Matches	1	320
Runs scored	9	2,952
Batting average	9.00	9.58
100s/50s	0/0	0/6
Top score	5*	84
Balls bowled	96	67,436
Wickets	2	1,331
Bowling average	25.50	21.55
5 wickets in innings	0	104
10 wickets in match	0	29
Best bowling	2/7	9/73
Catches/stumpings	2/–	234/–
- Source: CricInfo, 6 November 2022

Frederick William Tate (24 July 1867 – 24 February 1943) was an English cricketer who played in one Test in 1902. This was the famous match at Old Trafford which England lost by 3 runs, and with it the series. Tate had the misfortune to drop a crucial swerving lofted pull off the left-handed Australian captain, Joe Darling, the bowler being the leg-spinner Len Braund from the now Brian Statham End: just forward of square leg, in front of the refreshment stall (the bowler's testimony, and photos locate the structure), slightly in from the boundary, rail/tram-line side of the ground. England lost their ninth wicket in their second innings with eight runs wanted for victory. Tate joined Wilfred Rhodes and edged his first ball for four, but the fourth ball he received from Saunders bowled him. The patch of turf on which Tate dropped the catch is now in the pavilion lawn at Whalley Range Cricket Club, after Old Trafford lifted its playing area in August 2008, as is that where Clem Hill took his famous running catch in front of the pavilion in the same game. The England captain, Archie MacLaren, was born in Whalley Range and grew up there.

His first-class career with Sussex lasted from 1887 to 1905. Bowling off-spin at a brisk pace, he took 1331 first-class wickets at 21.55, with best innings figures of 9-73. After his playing career had ended, he became the coach at Derbyshire.

One of Tate's sons, Maurice, also played Test cricket. Another, Cecil Tate, played first-class cricket.

After his cricket career, Tate ran a pub in Derby until 1937. He died in poverty in 1943.

== See also ==
- One Test Wonder
