= Jim Kelly (Australian cricketer) =

Australian cricketer

James Kelly
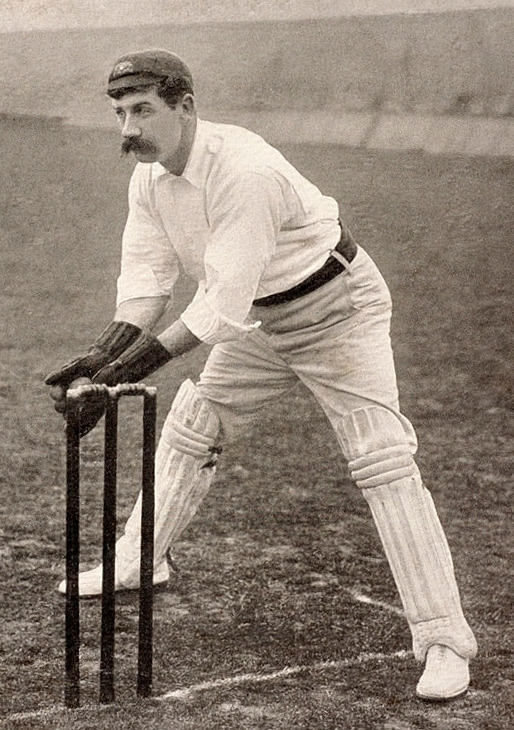
- Kelly in 1902

Personal information
- Born: 10 May 1867; Port Melbourne, Victoria, Australia
- Died: 14 August 1938 (aged 71); Sydney, Australia
- Batting: Right-handed

International information
- National side: Australia (1896–1905)
- Test debut (cap 75): 22 June 1896 v England
- Last Test: 14 August 1905 v England

Career statistics
Competition	Test	First-class
Matches	36	185
Runs scored	664	4108
Batting average	17.02	19.94
100s/50s	0/0	3/16
Top score	46*	108
Catches/stumpings	43/20	245/112
- Source: CricInfo, 12 October 2022

James Joseph Kelly (10 May 1867 – 14 August 1938) was a wicket-keeper who played for Australia and New South Wales.

He was Australia's first choice Test keeper from 1896 to 1905 and he was named a Wisden Cricketer of the Year in 1903. He toured England four times (1896, 1899, 1902 and 1905) and was also an able batsman, with a first-class average of 19.94 and a highest score of 108*. His career came to an end from medical advice, as he was struck above the heart while keeping during a test at Old Trafford in England.
