= Percy Perrin =

English cricketer

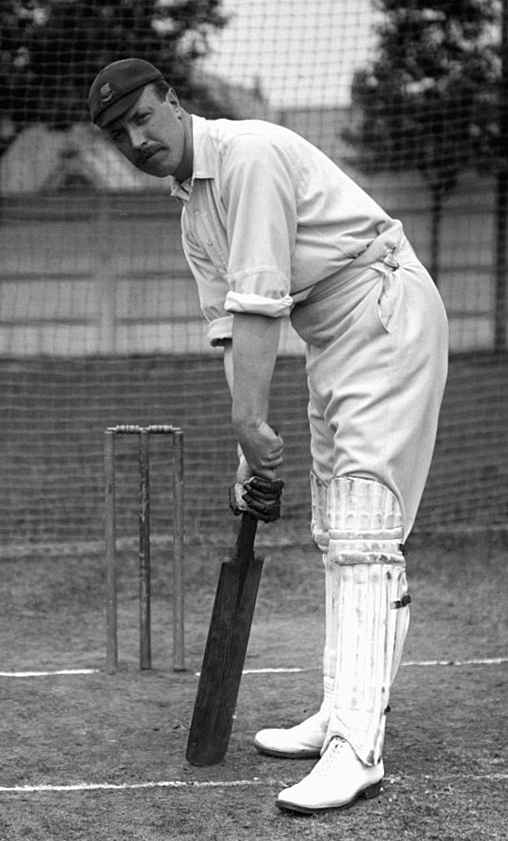

Personal information
- Full name: Percival Albert Perrin
- Born: 26 May 1876; Stoke Newington, England
- Died: 20 November 1945 (aged 69); Hickling Broad, Norfolk, England
- Batting: Right-handed
- Role: Middle-order batsman

Career statistics
Competition	FC
Matches	538
Runs scored	29709
Batting average	35.92
100s/50s	66/152
Top score	343*
Balls bowled	1279
Wickets	16
Bowling average	47.06
5 wickets in innings	–
10 wickets in match	–
Best bowling	3/13
Catches/stumpings	293/-
- Source: cricinfo, 18 September 2017

Percival Albert Perrin (26 May 1876 – 20 November 1945), known as either "Percy" or "Peter", was an English cricketer, who played for Essex as a right-handed middle-order batsman for more than thirty years from 1896.

Perrin was a Tottenham publican and a property developer who organised his considerable business activities around his cricket, turning out for Essex regularly from 1896 to 1926, and not retiring until 1928. His total of 496 County Championship matches for Essex is a record for an amateur player in English cricket.

A tall batsman who initially relied on driving for most of his runs, Perrin developed into a reliable player with virtually all the strokes. He and Charles McGahey, a similarly tall amateur, played together for Essex for many seasons and were known as the "Essex Twins". Perrin was the better batsman: he scored 1,000 in 18 seasons and in his long career made 29,709 runs at an average just short of 36 runs per innings. He scored 66 centuries, the third highest number – after John Langridge and Ken McEwan – of any player who never played Test cricket.

Perrin's biggest innings was a huge unbeaten 343, made out of an Essex total of 597 against Derbyshire at Chesterfield in 1904, which is the highest innings ever played by a batsman in a losing team.

Another record statistic from that innings, the 68 fours hit, gives a clue why Perrin was never selected for Test cricket, or even for one of the representative matches such as Gentlemen v Players: he was slow in the field and not a good runner. On the strength of that innings, though, he was picked as a Wisden Cricketer of the Year in the almanack for 1905.

Apparently a shy man, Perrin captained Essex only occasionally, serving happily under his friends McGahey and Johnny Douglas and deputising for them when needed. But in retirement, Perrin's knowledge and his availability led him to become an England selector in 1926 and later from 1930 to 1939, chairing the committee in the last year. When E. M. Wellings asked Douglas Jardine about how he regarded the selectors, Jardine replied, "We used to let Percy Perrin in the dressing-room, but he used to sit at the end of the balcony and keep quiet; but we wouldn't let any of the others in."
