= Charles Kortright =

English cricketer

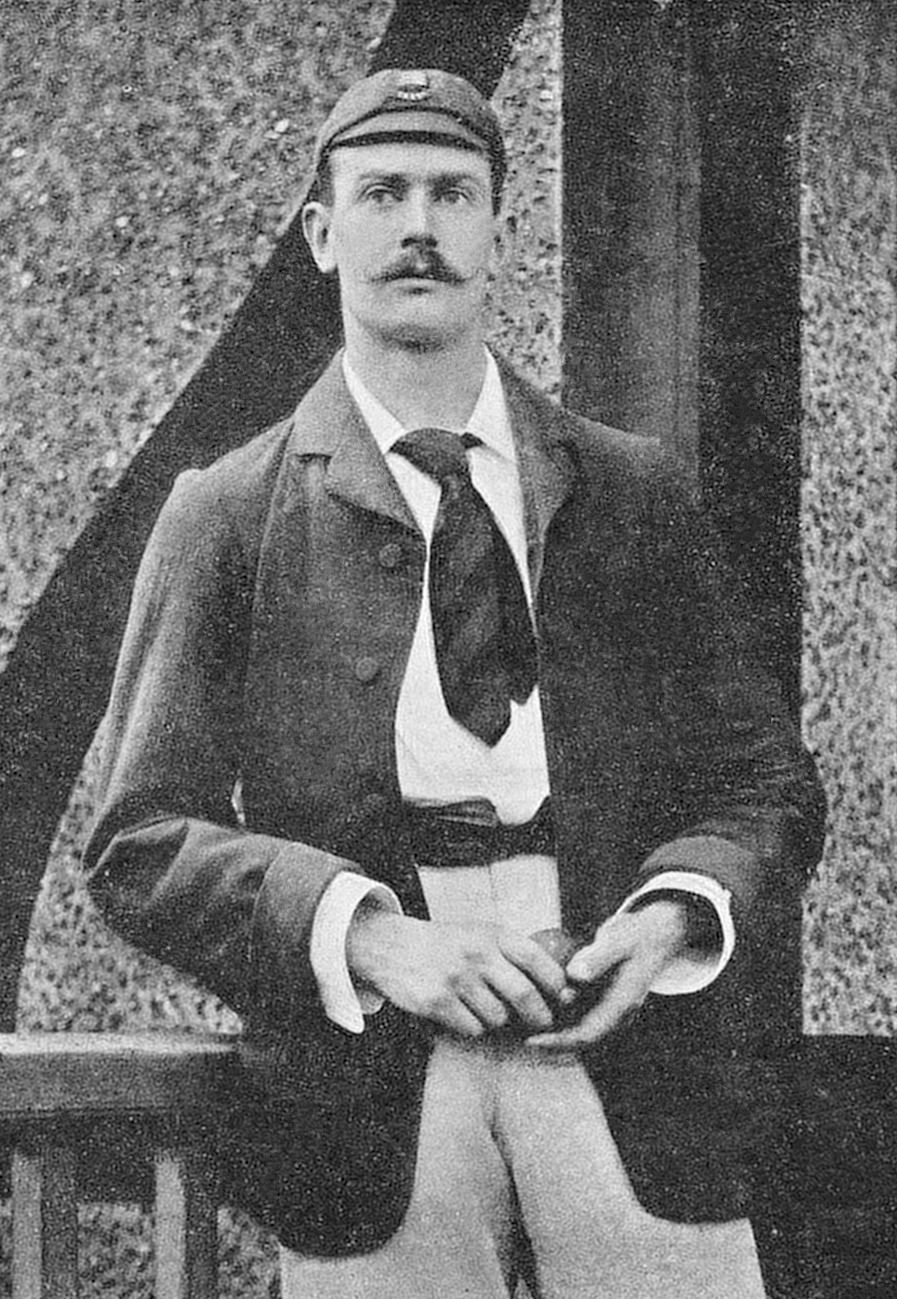

Cricket information
- Batting: Right-handed
- Bowling: Right-arm fast

Career statistics
Competition	First-class
Matches	170
Runs scored	4,404
Batting average	17.61
100s/50s	2/11
Top score	131
Balls bowled	18,225
Wickets	489
Bowling average	21.05
5 wickets in innings	39
10 wickets in match	8
Best bowling	8/57
Catches/stumpings	176/–
- Source: CricketArchive, 8 December 2022

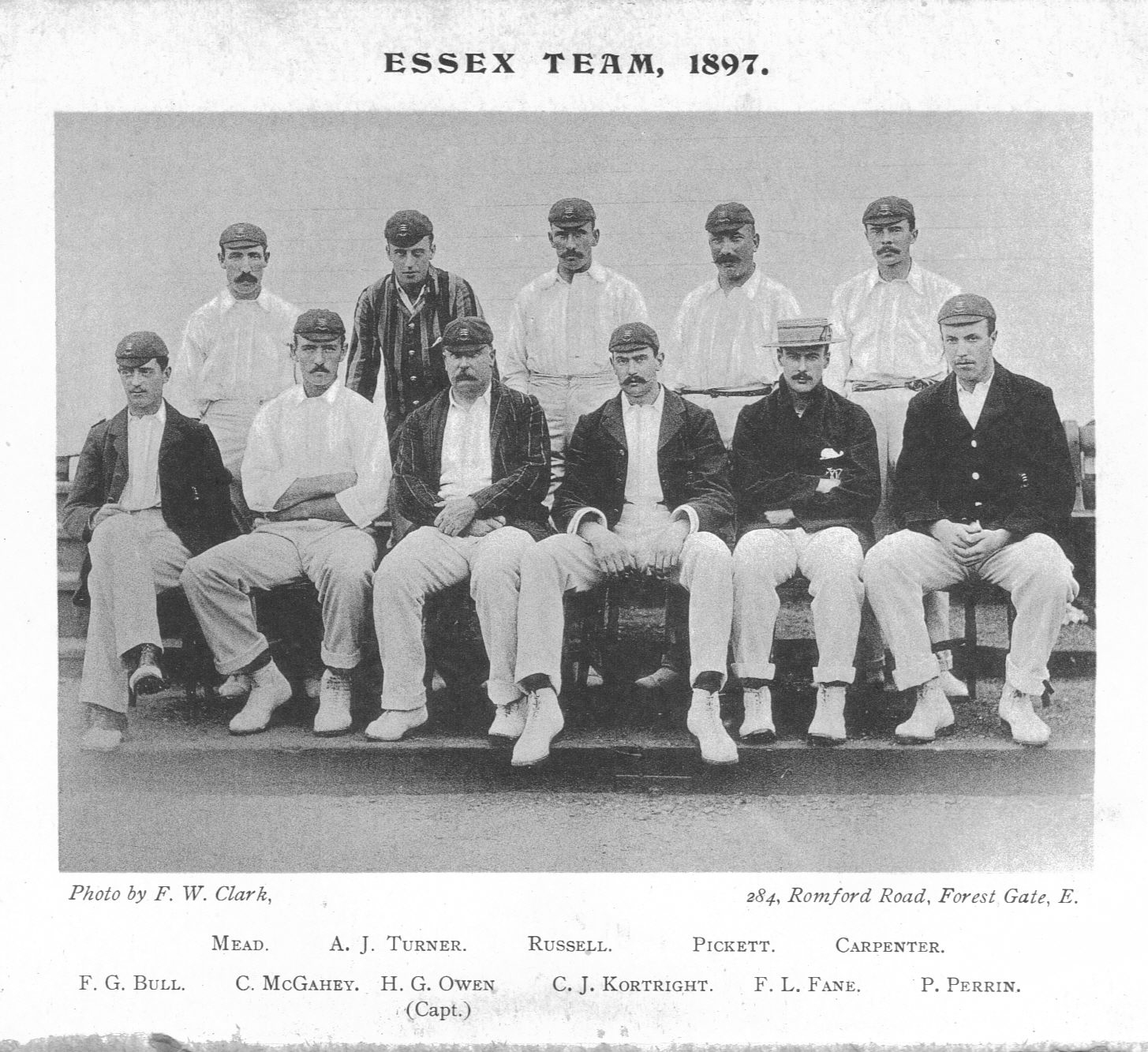
Kortright (front row 3rd from right) pictured with the Essex team of 1897

Charles Jesse Kortright (9 January 1871 – 11 December 1952) was an English cricketer, who played for Essex and Free Foresters. In his obituary in the 1953 edition of Wisden Cricketers' Almanack, he was described as "probably the fastest bowler in the history of the game", a judgement supported by those who saw and faced him.

== Background ==
He was the son of Augustus Kortright, an officer in the 68th (Durham) Regiment of Foot (Light Infantry) and his wife Mary Jephson, daughter of the Rev. John Mounteney Jephson. He was educated at Brentwood School, Essex, and at Tonbridge School 1885–1888. Given a stake in a brewery in Kent by his father, he took steps to learn the business. His first class cricket career began in 1893, and he sold out of the brewery in 1894.

== Cricket ==
Charles Kortright played for Essex from 1889 to 1907. Having a private income, he played as an amateur. He took 489 wickets in first-class matches at an average of 21.05, with best innings figures of 8/57. (Many of Essex's matches prior to 1895, when they were admitted to the County Championship, were not first-class.) He was also a useful, hard-hitting batsman, with two first-class hundreds to his credit and an average of 17.61. Unlike most other gentleman amateurs, Kortright trained hard and bowled fast off a long run-up. He appeared for the Gentlemen in the Gentlemen v Players match which, in years when no Test team was touring England, was the most prestigious fixture of the season. John Arlott included him in his best XI never to play Test cricket for England.

Kortright lived until 1952 and was interviewed shortly before his death. The bowlers of his era used the yorker as their main weapon; they had bowled on some pitches just as flat as modern "shirt fronts". The bowling crease was smaller in those days, which restricted their angles of attack. He pointed out that he had used a larger ball and had smaller stumps to bowl at. The way to overcome these obstacles was simply to get fitter and bowl faster.

Many batsmen were given a thorough battering by Kortright, including W. G. Grace. In 1898, Grace was approaching 50 years old: and he famously refused to speak to Kortright following a Gloucestershire vs Essex match. This was the occasion on which Kortright, having uprooted two stumps, after Grace had shamelessly intimidated the umpire out of giving several dismissals, said: "Surely you're not going, Doc? There's still one stump standing". Grace claimed that he had never been so insulted. They were reconciled a few days later when they almost batted their way to a draw in the Gentlemen v Players match. Kortright told the whole story in a radio interview in the 1950s: the Gentlemen were two minutes away from saving the match when Kortright was out, after a lengthy last-wicket partnership.

Another story Kortright told was of bowling a bouncer at Wallingford which flew over the batsman and was still rising as it cleared the boundary. He claimed this was the only time anyone had bowled six byes. Strictly, under the laws of cricket, it should have scored four byes.

Kortright never played a Test match. Eventually he turned to wrist spin and continued to take significant numbers of wickets. In 1903, he captained Essex. In retirement, he played golf.
