= Reggie Duff =

Australian cricketer

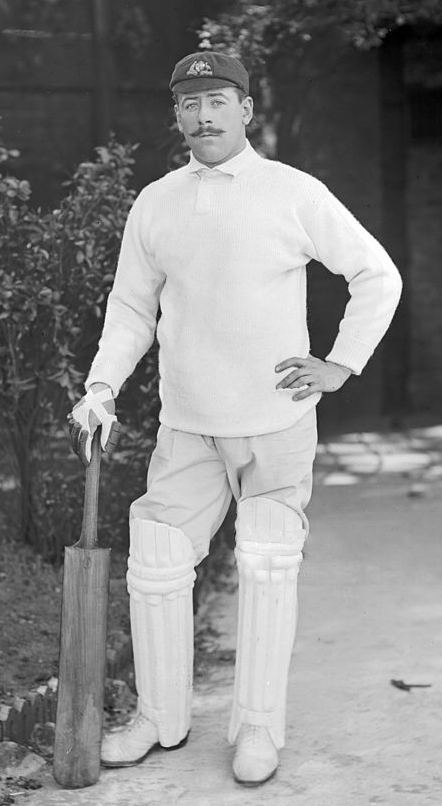

Personal information
- Full name: Reginald Alexander Duff
- Born: 17 August 1878; Sydney, New South Wales
- Died: 13 December 1911 (aged 33); St Leonards, New South Wales
- Batting: Right-handed
- Bowling: Right-arm medium

International information
- National side: Australia
- Test debut (cap 81): 1 January 1902 v England
- Last Test: 14 August 1905 v England

Career statistics
| Competition | Tests | First-class |
|---|---|---|
| Matches | 22 | 121 |
| Runs scored | 1317 | 6589 |
| Batting average | 35.59 | 35.04 |
| 100s/50s | 2/6 | 10/33 |
| Top score | 146 | 271 |
| Balls bowled | 180 | 917 |
| Wickets | 4 | 14 |
| Bowling average | 21.25 | 34.14 |
| 5 wickets in innings | 0 | 0 |
| 10 wickets in match | 0 | 0 |
| Best bowling | 2/43 | 2/17 |
| Catches/stumpings | 14/0 | 73/0 |
- Source: Cricinfo

Reginald Alexander Duff (17 August 1878 – 13 December 1911) was an Australian cricketer who played in 22 Tests between 1902 and 1905.

Duff made his Test debut along with Warwick Armstrong, against England at Melbourne in 1901–02 and scored 104 after being held back until No. 10 in the second innings due to a bad pitch. This innings was the first instance of a Test No. 10 scoring a hundred on debut and one of only four centuries from that low in the order by anyone. He was a specialist batsman and opened in the second innings of the next Test. He also scored a century in his last Test match, becoming the first batsman to score a century on Test debut as well as a century in his final Test.

Abul Hasan of Bangladesh became the second man to score a Test century at debut at No. 10 in 2012.

Duff's career was plagued by alcoholism, and he lost his life at the age of 33 in 1911. His former colleagues from his home state of New South Wales paid for his funeral.

Ric Sissons wrote a biography of Duff in 2015, Reggie, five years of fame, Reg Duff’s story. He was discussed briefly by Mike Atherton and Mark Butcher during the 2022 test at Trent Bridge, due to the absence of ducks during his Test Career.

== See also ==
- List of New South Wales representative cricketers
