= Bert Hopkins =

Australian cricketer

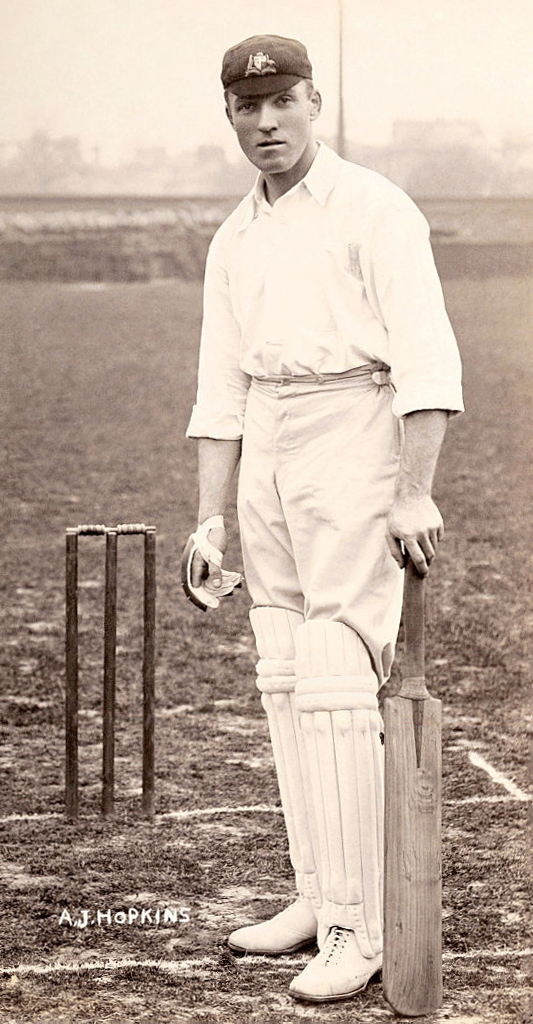
- Hopkins c. 1908

Personal information
- Full name: Albert John Young Hopkins
- Born: 3 May 1874; Young, New South Wales, Australia
- Died: 25 April 1931 (aged 56); North Sydney, New South Wales, Australia
- Nickname: Hoppo
- Height: 184 cm (6 ft 0 in)
- Batting: Right-handed
- Bowling: Right-arm fast-medium
- Role: All rounder

International information
- National side: Australia
- Test debut (cap 82): 14 February 1902 v England
- Last Test: 9 August 1909 v England

Career statistics
Competition	Tests	First-class
Matches	20	162
Runs scored	509	5563
Batting average	16.41	25.40
100s/50s	0/0	8/23
Top score	43	218
Balls bowled	1327	13619
Wickets	26	271
Bowling average	26.76	24.39
5 wickets in innings	0	10
10 wickets in match	0	0
Best bowling	4/81	7/10
Catches/stumpings	11/0	87/0
- Source: Cricinfo

Albert John Young "Bert" Hopkins (3 May 1874 – 25 April 1931) was an Australian cricketer who played in 20 Tests between 1902 and 1909. An all-rounder, Hopkins was a competent bowler and batsman in Australian domestic cricket for New South Wales, however he was less frequently called on to bowl in Test matches: he was not asked to bowl in a quarter of his appearances.

In the second Test at Lord's in 1902 under captain Joe Darling, Hopkins opened the bowling for Australia with Ernie Jones. Hopkins took the first two wickets of the English team, the famed batsmen C. B. Fry and Ranjitsinhji, both for ducks. These were the only two wickets that fell in the match, which was abandoned not long afterwards owing to persistent rain. He was also a strong fielder.

He worked in the Probate Office of New South Wales for more than 25 years. He died in hospital in April 1931 after a short illness, 8 days before his 57th birthday.

== See also ==
- List of New South Wales representative cricketers
