= Jack Saunders (Australian cricketer) =

Australian cricketer

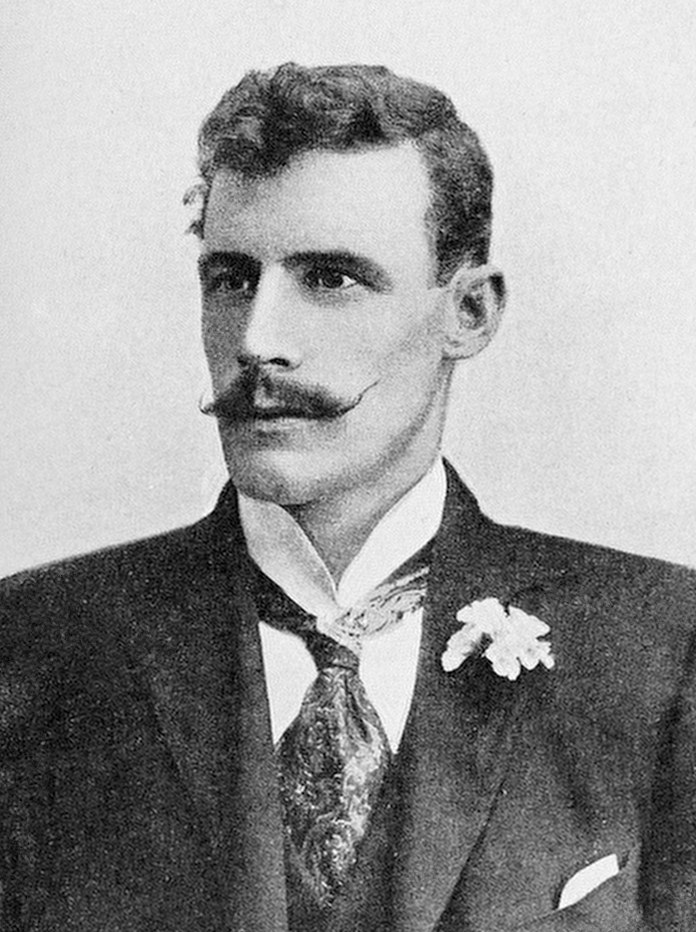
- Saunders in about 1900

Personal information
- Born: 21 March 1876; Melbourne, Victoria, Australia
- Died: 21 December 1927 (aged 51); Toorak, Victoria, Australia
- Batting: Left-handed
- Bowling: Left-arm medium Slow left-arm orthodox

International information
- National side: Australia
- Test debut (cap 83): 14 February 1902 v England
- Last Test: 21 February 1908 v England

Domestic team information
- Years: Team
- 1899–1900 to 1909–10: Victoria
- 1910–11 to 1913–14: Wellington

Career statistics
| Competition | Tests | First-class |
|---|---|---|
| Matches | 14 | 107 |
| Runs scored | 39 | 586 |
| Batting average | 2.29 | 4.76 |
| 100s/50s | 0/0 | 0/0 |
| Top score | 11* | 29* |
| Balls bowled | 3,565 | 24,116 |
| Wickets | 79 | 553 |
| Bowling average | 22.73 | 21.81 |
| 5 wickets in innings | 6 | 48 |
| 10 wickets in match | 0 | 9 |
| Best bowling | 7/34 | 8/106 |
| Catches/stumpings | 5/0 | 71/0 |
- Source: ESPNcricinfo, 29 May 2019

John Victor Saunders (21 March 1876 – 21 December 1927) was an Australian cricketer who played in 14 Test matches between 1902 and 1908. On his Test debut, he took five wickets in the second innings against England in Sydney. He went on to take 79 Test wickets.

Jack Saunders was a medium-paced left-arm spin bowler. The sharp flick of the wrist he used in his delivery gave rise to doubts about its legality, and although he was never called for throwing, these doubts may have prevented his selection for more than one tour of England. His best Test figures were 7 for 34, when he bowled unchanged to dismiss South Africa for 83 in the Second Test at Johannesburg in 1902–03. His best first-class figures were 8 for 106 (13 for 194 in the match) for Victoria against South Australia a few months later. He had an outstanding season in England in 1902, taking 123 wickets at an average of 16.95, taking five or more wickets in an innings 10 times.

After the 1909–10 Australian season Saunders moved to New Zealand, where worked as coach and groundsman to the Wellington Cricket Association. He played first-class cricket for Wellington for four seasons, and represented New Zealand in one match against the touring Australian team in 1913–14.
