= Len Braund =

English cricketer

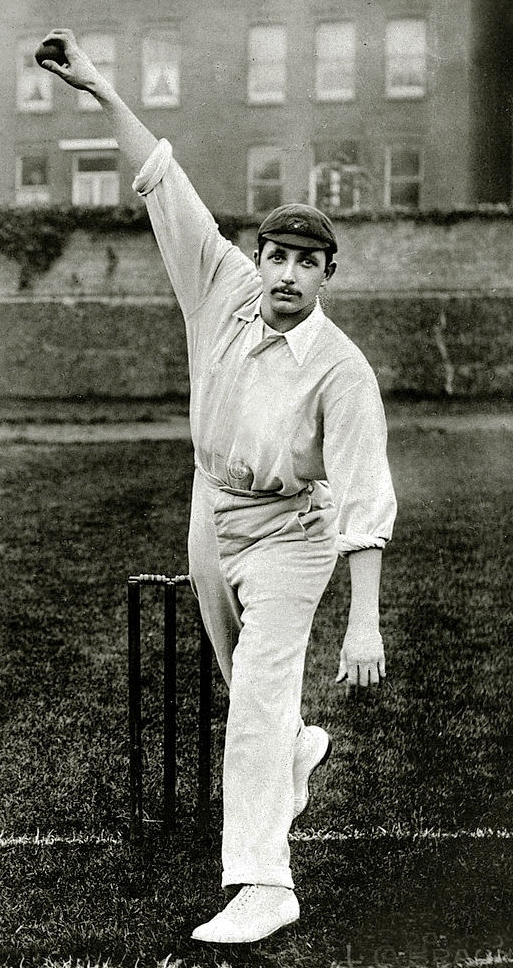

Personal information
- Full name: Leonard Charles Braund
- Born: 18 October 1875; Clewer, Berkshire, England
- Died: 23 December 1955 (aged 80); Putney Common, London, England
- Batting: Right-handed
- Bowling: Legbreak
- Role: All-rounder

International information
- National side: England
- Test debut (cap 131): 13 December 1901 v Australia
- Last Test: 21 February 1908 v Australia

Domestic team information
- Years: Team
- 1896–1898: Surrey
- 1899–1920: Somerset

Umpiring information
- Tests umpired: 3 (1926–1929)
- FC umpired: 374 (1923–1938)

Career statistics
Competition	Test	First-class
Matches	23	432
Runs scored	987	17,801
Batting average	25.97	25.61
100s/50s	3/2	25/75
Top score	104	257*
Balls bowled	3805	53,709
Wickets	47	1,114
Bowling average	38.51	27.28
5 wickets in innings	3	80
10 wickets in match	0	16
Best bowling	8/81	9/41
Catches/stumpings	39/–	546/1
- Source: CricketArchive, 10 October 2009

Leonard Charles Braund (18 October 1875 – 23 December 1955) was a cricketer who played for Surrey, Somerset and England.

Len Braund was an all-rounder, a versatile batsman who could defend or attack according to the needs of the game and a leg break bowler who used variation more than accuracy to take wickets. He was also regarded by contemporaries as the best slip fielder of his time.

Braund played 21 times from 1896 for Surrey before joining Somerset, where he had to qualify for County Championship games by residence. On his Somerset debut, he hit 82 against the 1899 Australians. The following year, he made his Championship debut for Somerset against Middlesex at Lord's, in Andrew Stoddart's last match; but this was also Braund's last match of the season for Somerset, as Marylebone Cricket Club (MCC) ruled that he was not properly qualified. To fill in the waiting, he played for W. G. Grace's London County.

Braund's proper career starts from 1901, and in his first full season he scored more than 1,000 runs and took over 100 wickets. He scored 107 in a remarkable match at Headingley when Somerset, 238 behind Yorkshire on the first innings, put up 630 in the second innings and won the match by 279 runs, Braund taking four wickets as the home team collapsed to 113 all out in the second innings. It was Yorkshire's only defeat of the season, and Somerset repeated that feat in 1902, a closer match won by just 34 runs in which Braund took 15 wickets for 71 runs, including a career-best nine for 41 in the second innings.

In between these two county matches, Braund had become a Test cricketer, selected for the 1901–02 England tour of Australia. He was an instant success in Tests, scoring 58 in his first Test innings and taking seven wickets, including five for 61 in the second innings, as England beat Australia by an innings at Sydney. In the third Test, at Adelaide, he scored an unbeaten 103, and in the series as a whole he led England by taking 21 wickets.

Named as one of the Wisden Cricketers of the Year in 1902, Braund played all five matches in The Ashes series that season and was involved in many of the crucial incidents in a very close contest. He caught Clem Hill at Edgbaston off George Herbert Hirst by running from slip round to the leg side. Gilbert Jessop described it as “quite the most brilliant anticipatory effort that I have yet seen”. Australia were all out for 36, their lowest Test total. At Old Trafford, he came in with England at 44 for five wickets and scored 65, putting on 141 with Stanley Jackson; in the same match, he was the bowler off whom Fred Tate missed a skied catch from Joe Darling that enabled Australia to win by three runs.

Braund's second tour to Australia in 1903–04 was also successful. He scored 102 at Sydney while R. E. Foster was scoring his then-record 287, and he took eight wickets for 81 runs in the first innings of the final Test at Melbourne. His third visit to Australia in 1907–08 was less of a success, but in between he had scored a third Test century, making 104 against the 1907 South African team that included the sensational googly bowlers who had brought South Africa its first Test victories over England in 1905–06.

In all, he played 23 Tests, scoring 987 runs and taking 47 wickets. In first-class cricket, Braund did the double of 1,000 runs and 100 wickets in the season three times, in 1901, 1902, and 1903, and in a career that lasted until 1920 he scored 17,801 runs and took 1,114 wickets. In the later part of his career, he lost the ability to spin the ball and became very expensive; by 1910, he played for Somerset largely as a batsman. He took 546 catches in his career.

After retiring, Braund coached at Cambridge University and was a first-class umpire for 18 seasons to 1938, standing in three Test matches between 1926 and 1929.

A convivial man who enjoyed drinking and horse-racing, Braund was beset by ill-health in his later life and had both legs amputated during the Second World War. Despite this, he was a regular attender at Lord's right up to his death, and he was one of the first 26 former professionals to be granted honorary membership of MCC in 1949.
