= Gilbert Jessop =

English cricketer (1874–1955)

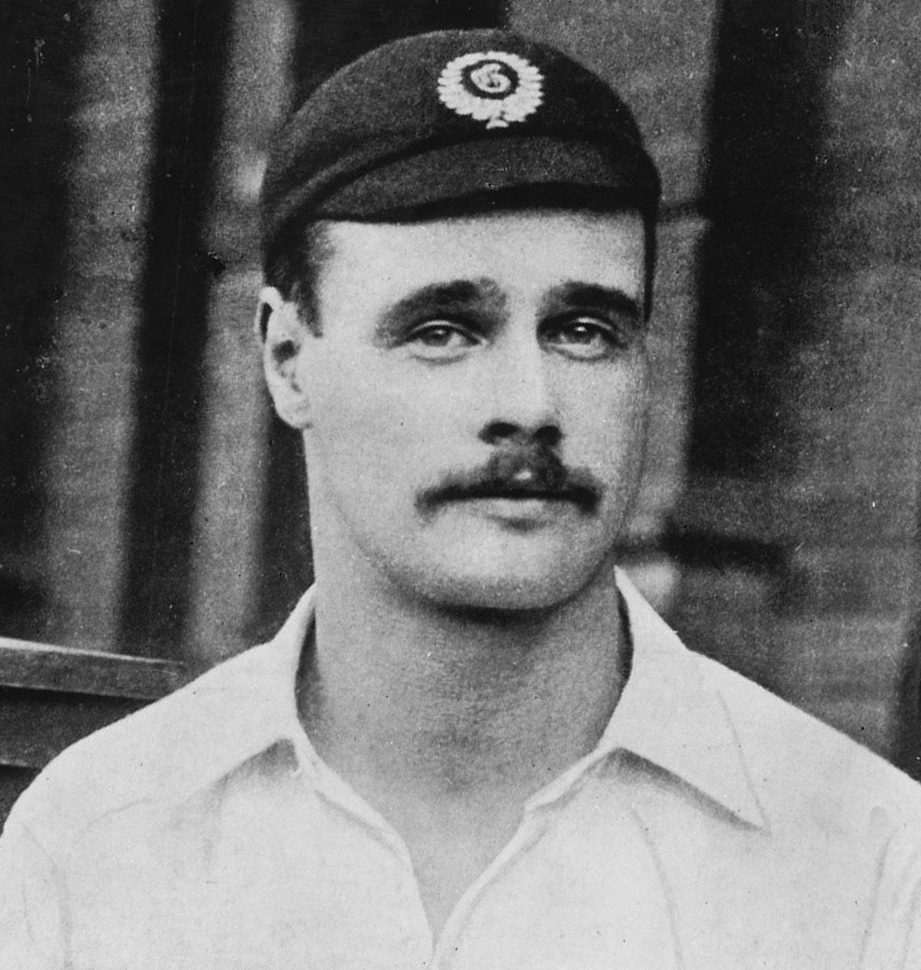
- Jessop in 1901

Personal information
- Full name: Gilbert Laird Jessop
- Born: 19 May 1874; Cheltenham, England
- Died: 11 May 1955 (aged 80); Dorchester, England
- Height: 5 ft 7 in (1.70 m)
- Batting: Right-handed
- Bowling: Right arm fast
- Role: All-rounder
- Relatives: Gilbert Jessop junior (son)

International information
- National side: England (1899–1912)
- Test debut (cap 122): 15 June 1899 v Australia
- Last Test: 10 July 1912 v South Africa

Domestic team information
- Years: Team
- 1894–1914: Gloucestershire
- 1896–1899: Cambridge University
- 1900–1902: London County

Career statistics
Competition	Test	First-class
Matches	18	493
Runs scored	569	26,698
Batting average	21.88	32.63
100s/50s	1/3	53/127
Top score	104	286
Balls bowled	732	42,442
Wickets	10	873
Bowling average	35.40	22.79
5 wickets in innings	0	41
10 wickets in match	0	4
Best bowling	4/68	8/29
Catches/stumpings	11/–	463/–
- Source: Cricinfo, 3 October 2009

Gilbert Laird Jessop (19 May 1874 – 11 May 1955) was an English cricketer, often reckoned to have been one of the fastest run-scorers cricket has ever known. He was Wisden Cricketer of the Year for 1898 and compiled the fastest century ever for England.

== Career ==
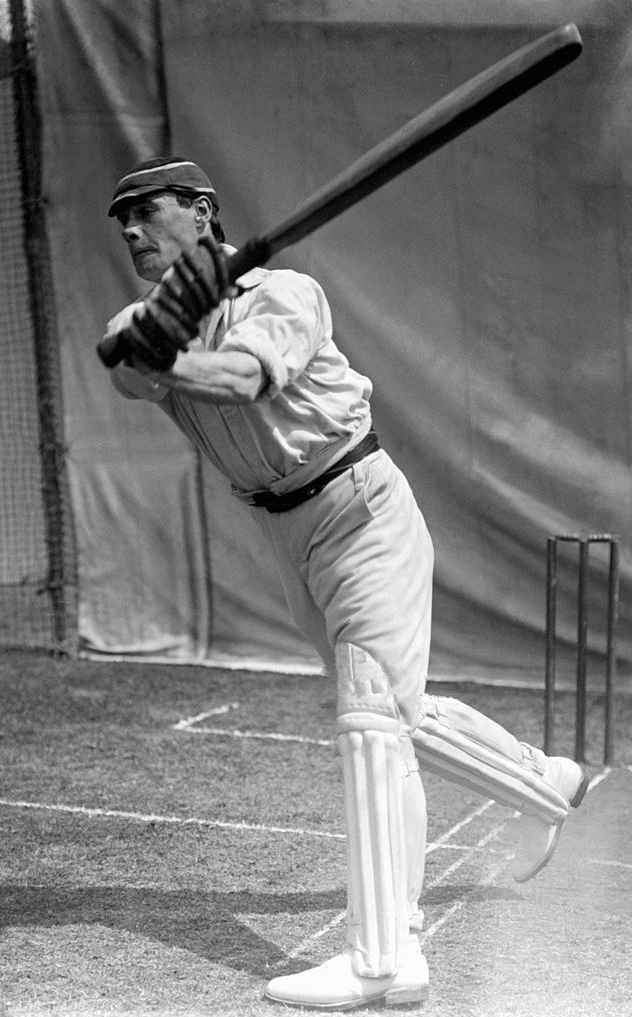
Jessop c. 1905

Jessop was born in Cheltenham, Gloucestershire. Nicknamed "The Croucher" because of his unusual hunched stance at the crease and though a stocky build at 5'7" and 11 stone, he remained a fast bowler through his career. He was also a powerful driver, cutter and hooker. The Fifth Test at The Oval in August 1902, known as "Jessop's match", highlighted Jessop's ability to play quickly. England had an unlikely one-wicket victory against a quality Australian side who set England 263 to win in the fourth innings. Jessop came to the crease with England at 48 for 5. He scored his first 50 runs in 43 minutes and reached his century in 75 minutes. He was eventually dismissed after 77 minutes for 104, which included 17 fours and an all-run five. Many of the fours had well cleared the boundary, but the laws of cricket in 1902 meant that to obtain six runs the ball had to be hit out of the ground. One of these "fours" was caught on the players' balcony. A newspaper managed to keep a detailed record of his innings, which shows that Jessop reached his hundred off 76 balls – one of the fastest Test centuries of all time.

A genuine all-rounder, in his early days he was a bowler of considerable pace. He could maintain great stamina; however, he suffered a back strain in his debut Test from being over-bowled which plagued his career. (Frith, 2007) Jessop was also a quick fielder, giving Gloucestershire a reputation for strength in the field. His fielding was a matter of great pride to him. In his early days he fielded at cover-point; later he specialised in the position of extra mid-off.

He first played for Gloucestershire in 1894, and a short innings of 30 against the deadly bowling of Mold and Briggs was seen as indicating a promising player. In 1897 when Jessop did the "double" of 1000 runs and 100 wickets, Wisden made him a Cricketer of the Year 1898. Two years later his two innings against Yorkshire at Bradford both featured scores of a century before lunch, 104 in the first innings in forty minutes, and 139 in the second, again reaching his hundred in under an hour.

Jessop went up to Christ's College, Cambridge in 1896, intending to study for the priesthood, although this was not to materialise as he left without taking a degree. He played for Cambridge University for four seasons, being captain in the last (1899). In the 1897 Varsity match he took six wickets for 65 in the first innings; in 1898 he took six wickets for 126 in the first innings.

After two moderate years – despite a Test debut in 1899 – Jessop in 1900 took over as captain and secretary of Gloucestershire and had his finest year, scoring 2210 runs and taking 104 wickets including a career-best 8 for 29 against Essex. The following year, whilst he lost his pace and his bowling declined to fewer than thirty wickets, his batting improved further, whilst 1902 was highlighted by his Fifth Test efforts at the Oval.

In 1903, Jessop played the highest innings of his career – 286 in 180 minutes against Sussex – and for the rest of the decade, as well as being captain of Gloucestershire, he was their batting mainstay, though after 1901 he could rarely bowl at a quick pace. Despite a major injury in 1909 keeping him off the field for over two months, Jessop continued to be a major force as a batsman until he relinquished the secretaryship of Gloucestershire in 1912. In his last two seasons he was not always available and showed only modest form, and, at the age of 45, did not play again when cricket resumed after World War I.

Among his 53 centuries were five of more than 200:

- 286 out of 335 in 175 minutes for Gloucestershire against Sussex at Brighton, 1903 (he and J. H. Board adding 320 for the sixth wicket);
- 240 out of 337 in 200 minutes for Gloucestershire v. Sussex at Bristol, 1907;
- 234 out of 346 in 155 minutes for Gloucestershire v. Somerset at Bristol, 1905;
- 233 out of 318 in 150 minutes for England Eleven v. Yorkshire at Lord's, 1901;
- 206 out of 317 in 150 minutes for Gloucestershire v. Nottinghamshire at Trent Bridge, 1904.

When scoring centuries, Jessop batted with a scoring rate of 82.7 runs per hour.

== Tributes ==
- Richie Benaud: "Perhaps the best one-day player to have ever lived and never played that form of cricket."
- Sir Jack Hobbs: "He was undoubtedly the most consistently fast scorer I have seen. He was a big hitter, too, and it was difficult to bowl a ball from which he could not score. He made me glad that I was not a bowler. Gilbert Jessop certainly drew the crowds, too, even more than Bradman, I should say."

== Football career ==
Jessop also played football for Gloucester A.F.C. and Cheltenham Town F.C.

== Death ==
Jessop died on 11 May 1955, in Dorchester, Dorset, England, from congestive heart failure, at the age of 80.
