= Palairet =

Palairet is a surname. Notable people with the surname include:

- Elias Palairet (1713–1765), Dutch minister and classical scholar
- Jean Palairet (1697–1774), French cartographer
- Lionel Palairet (1870–1933), English cricketer
- Sir Michael Palairet (1882–1956), British diplomat
- Richard Palairet (1871–1955), English cricketer
