= Robin Hoare =

Royal Navy officer (1890–1959)

Keith Robin Hoare
- Born: 26 September 1890; Isle of Wight, England
- Died: 6 February 1959 (aged 68); Carlisle, England
- Military career
- Allegiance: United Kingdom
- Branch: Royal Naval Volunteer Reserve
- Service years: 1902–1903; 1914–1919; 1939–1945
- Rank: Lieutenant commander
- Commands: HM Naval Base Haifa
- Conflicts: First World War: First Ostend Raid; Second Ostend Raid; Second World War
- Awards: Distinguished Service Order & Bar; Distinguished Service Cross; Albert Medal; Mentioned in Despatches (3)

Lieutenant Commander Keith Robin Hoare, DSO & Bar, DSC, AM (26 September 1890 – 6 February 1959) was a Royal Navy officer and a recipient of the Albert Medal, a high level decoration of the United Kingdom and Commonwealth awarded for gallantry in saving life. Hoare was awarded the Albert Medal in 1918 for his actions in removing depth charges from HM Motor Launch 356 after its engine room exploded, despite the flames, thus preventing a further explosion. With the establishment of the George Cross in 1940, the Albert Medal was discontinued.

== Early life ==
Robin Hoare was born the son of Charles Arthur Richard Hoare, Senior Partner of C. Hoare & Co, bankers, and Beatrice Holme Sumner on 26 September 1890. The family lived on the Isle of Wight but in 1892 moved to Hamble in Hampshire. He was educated at Northwood Park School on the Isle of Wight and Loretto School near Edinburgh. In his youth, he was a regular visitor to the Training Ship Mercury which from 1908 was managed by his mother and his stepfather, C. B. Fry.

== First World War ==
Hoare's first military experience came when he was commissioned into the 1st Hampshire Royal Garrison Artillery, Volunteer Force, as a second lieutenant on 6 December 1902; he later transferred to the Lancashire Royal Garrison Artillery. He then emigrated to New Zealand where he stayed for several years before working his passage home via Valparaíso where he collected some polo ponies for delivery to the United Kingdom.

With the outbreak of the First World War in 1914 he was commissioned as a temporary sub-lieutenant in the Royal Naval Volunteer Reserve on 7 October 1914, initially for service in the Royal Naval Division. He transferred to the Auxiliary Patrol on 27 November 1914, and was promoted lieutenant on 7 October 1915. In 1917 and early 1918 he made several applications for transfer to the submarine service or to larger craft: these were all refused. He was promoted to acting lieutenant commander on 25 February 1918, and on 6 April 1918, Hoare was awarded the Distinguished Service Cross for his service in the Patrol during the course of the previous year.

On 12 April 1918, the engine room of HM Motor Launch 356 exploded at Dunkirk quay, after a collision with another vessel, and the forward petrol tanks burst into flames. Several of the launch's crew were blown overboard by the explosion, while the remainder were driven off by the fire. Flames soon began to issue forth from the cabin, and burning petrol spread on the surface of the water. As others proceeded to flee the scene, Hoare, along with Lieutenant Arthur Bagot, realised the fire was threatening the aft petrol tanks and the depth charges located on board the launch. Jumping in a dinghy, the pair rowed out towards the blaze. On reaching the wreck, Hoare and Bagot removed the depth charges despite the flames; thus preventing any further explosion.

For their actions during the incident, both Hoare and Bagot were awarded the Albert Medal. The announcement and accompanying citation for the award was published in The London Gazette on 20 August 1918, reading:

Admiralty, 20th August, 1918.

The KING has been graciously pleased to approve of the award of the Albert Medal for Gallantry in Saving Life at Sea to

Lieutenant-Commander Keith Robin Hoare, D.S.O., D.S.C., R.N.V.R., and Lieutenant Arthur Gerald Bagot, D.S.C., R.N.V.R.

The account of the services in respect of which the Decoration has been conferred is as follows: —

On the 12th April, 1918, an explosion took place in the engine-room of H.M. Motor Launch 356, and the forward tanks burst into flame. The Officer and some of the crew were blown overboard by the explosion, and the remainder were quickly driven aft by the flames, and were taken off in a skiff. By this time the flames were issuing from the cabin hatch aft, and there was much petrol burning on the surface of the water. It was then realised by the crews of adjacent vessels that the aft petrol tanks and the depth charge were being attacked by the fire, and might explode at any moment. At the moment when others were running away, Lieutenant Hoare and Sub-Lieutenant Bagot jumped into their dinghy, rowed to the wreck, got on board, and removed the depth charge, thereby preventing an explosion which might have caused serious loss of life amongst the crowd of English and French sailors on the quay.

Appointed Commander of Motor Launch 283, Hoare was in action at the First Ostend Raid on 23 April 1918. Throughout the operation, the launch conducted duties of rescuing officers and men from HMS Sirius and HMS Brilliant. Praised for "exercising the utmost coolness and judgement" during the engagement, Hoare was awarded the Distinguished Service Order. His citation records that he went alongside HMS Sirius under heavy fire and took off 50 of her crew and then went alongside HMS Brilliant and took off 16 of that ship's crew. The notification of the award was published in a supplement to the London Gazette on 23 July 1918. His acting rank was also confirmed as a further reward for his success in this operation. He was invested with his DSO and DSC by King George V in a ceremony at Buckingham Palace on 31 July 1918.

He was also involved in the Second Ostend Raid on 9 May 1918, for which he received a Mention in Despatches and a Bar to his DSO on 28 August. He was given his AM and the Bar to his DSO in a further investiture soon after. He received further Mentions on 18 February 1919 (relating back to the incident for which he also received his first DSO), and on 8 March 1919. Hoare was demobilised on 24 September 1919.

== Later life ==
After the War, Hoare became the manager of a fleet of fishing trawlers owned by Sam Robford & Co, a business based in Aberdeen. In 1926, Robin Hoare, in partnership with lieutenant commanders Sydney Allen and Lionell Chappell, took an interest in the Honister Slate Mine in Borrowdale, Cumbria: Hoare became the resident director while his colleagues became sleeping partners.

At the start of the Second World War, Hoare returned the Royal Navy, seeing action on armed trawlers with Dover Command from May 1940 and then joining Combined Operations to undertake landing craft duties in preparation for the Normandy landings from August 1943 before serving as commanding officer, HM Naval Base Haifa from January 1945.

Hoare returned to Honister Slate Mine in 1945. He died in 1959 while still active as resident director of the mine. In 1971, the remaining living holders of the Albert Medal were instructed to return it, and they were issued with the George Cross in its place.

== Family ==
In 1919 he married Brenda Bardsley and together they had a son and three daughters. From around 1930 they lived at Portinscale near Keswick in Cumbia.

== Sources ==
- Ian Tyler (1994) "Honister Slate – The History of a Lakeland Slate Mine", Blue Rock Publications ISBN 0-9523028-0-2.
