= Malcolm Jardine =

English Amateur cricketer and barrister (1869–1947)

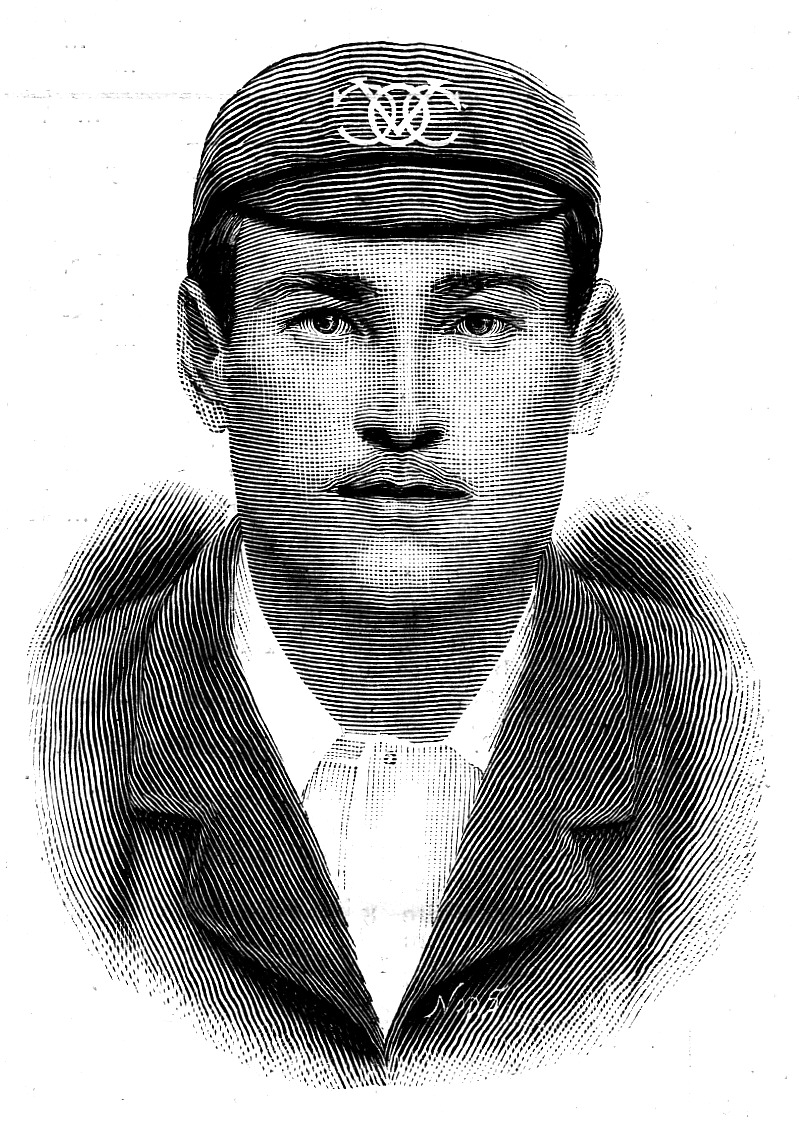

Personal information
- Full name: Malcolm Robert Jardine
- Born: 8 June 1869; Simla, Punjab, British India
- Died: 16 January 1947 (aged 77); South Kensington, London, England
- Batting: Right-handed
- Bowling: Right-arm fast-medium
- Role: Middle-order batsman

Domestic team information
- Years: Team
- 1889–1892: Oxford University
- 1892: Middlesex
- 1894–1902: Europeans (India)
- 1897: MCC

Career statistics
Competition	First-class
Matches	46
Runs scored	1,439
Batting average	17.76
100s/50s	1/7
Top score	140
Balls bowled	416
Wickets	15
Bowling average	14.40
5 wickets in innings	1
10 wickets in match	0
Best bowling	5/78
Catches/stumpings	42/–
- Source: ESPNcricinfo, 14 August 2010

Malcolm Robert Jardine (8 June 1869 – 16 January 1947) was an English first-class cricketer who played 46 matches, mainly for Oxford University. Although his first-class record was not impressive, he scored 140 in the University Match of 1892 using an unorthodox batting method. He played a few matches for Middlesex but later went to work in India, in effect ending his English first-class career. He played first-class cricket in India for the Europeans and after a successful legal career, returned to England. His son Douglas went on to play cricket for Oxford, Surrey and England, captaining the latter two and being associated with the use of Bodyline bowling.

== Early life ==
Jardine was born in Simla, British India on 8 June 1869 to a family which had been connected with India for many years. He was the second son of William Jardine, a barrister and later a judge in Allahabad who had a successful legal career before he died from cholera aged 32. He was educated at Fettes College, a boarding school in Edinburgh, making it into the school cricket team for four consecutive years. He established a good reputation and was appointed captain of the side in 1888. That year, his batting average was 77.70, and he took 24 wickets at an average of 6.30, coming top of both sets of averages for the school.

== First-class cricketer ==
=== Career at Oxford ===
In 1889, Jardine went to Balliol College, Oxford. He made his first-class debut for Oxford University against the Gentlemen of England. In his third match, against Lancashire, he passed fifty for the first time. Although his next highest score in fifteen innings was just 33, and he failed to reach double figures eight times, he was awarded his Blue. He had some success with his bowling, taking five wickets for 78 in a Surrey total of 614. He played in the University Match but failed to score in either innings and Oxford lost heavily. In total, he scored 198 runs at an average of 13.20. The following season, Jardine scored more runs at a higher average, but failed to pass fifty in an innings. He scored 218 runs at an average of 14.53 and did not bowl. Although he was more successful in the University Match, scoring 3 and 24, Oxford lost again after being bowled out for 42 in their first innings. In 1891, Jardine was appointed captain of the university. He further improved his aggregate and average with 255 runs at an average of 18.21, and took two wickets for five runs in the only innings in which he bowled. In the second and third matches, he scored 62 not out and 70 in consecutive innings against the Gentlemen of England and H Phillipson's XI, but did not pass fifty again. Playing in the University Match, he scored a duck in the first innings and 15 in the second, and Oxford lost their third successive match, although they took eight wickets before Cambridge reached their target of 93.

Jardine's final season at Oxford was his most successful; he recorded his highest aggregate and average despite playing only four matches for the club. At the start of the season, Lionel Palairet took over the captaincy. Jardine's studies preventing him from playing in any of Oxford's home games, and he did not appear in the team until June. He only took part in three games before the University Match, although in the last of these he scored 60 against Marylebone Cricket Club (MCC) at Lord's.

=== 1892 University Match ===
In his final University Match, Oxford batted first and Jardine's innings began after his team had lost two wickets without scoring any runs. He batted for 285 minutes, scoring 140. Before lunch, he played very carefully but increased his scoring rate afterwards. In total, he hit 21 fours and The Times described his innings as faultless. Wisden noted his strong defence and his powerful leg glance. Critics noted that he frequently hit Stanley Jackson to the leg side, a method of play which was unusual at the time. Players educated at Public School generally considered hitting to leg highly unorthodox and almost unfair. K. S. Ranjitsinhji, who was in the crowd at Lord's, would develop the leg glance and make it respectable within a few years, but he had not yet made his first-class debut in 1892. It is likely that Jardine was one of the first players to use this shot. Jackson refused to depart from the orthodox methods of the time, continuing to bowl with seven fielders on the off side and only two on the leg side, making it easier for Jardine to score runs. The Times commented that Cambridge "appeared a little slow to grasp the idea of putting a man on the leg side for [Jardine]". Jardine also hit 39 in the second innings as Oxford chased down a target to win for the only time in his University career. Jardine's first innings remained his only first-class century.

=== Other first-class cricket ===
In the remainder of the 1892 season, Jardine played for Middlesex. He played six matches, but scored just 102 runs and averaged 12.75 with the bat; hitting a highest score of 32 not out. Subsequently, Jardine's work as a barrister took him to India, and he played just four more first-class matches in England. These were for the MCC at the beginning of the 1897 season, where he scored 185 runs at an average of 23.12 with two fifties and a highest score of 85. His only other first-class cricket was for the Europeans cricket team in India. He played in the annual Presidency Match against the Parsees between 1894 and 1902, only missing the 1899 and 1901 games. He scored just one fifty in eight matches, but his batting was admired by critics.

Although Jardine did not have an impressive first-class record, critics including Ranjitsinjhi, and Plum Warner considered him a good batsman. C. B. Fry believed that if Jardine had played regular county cricket, he would have played for England. Fry described him as a superb fielder and as "a beautiful player, with a perfect back-stroke and a perfect cut and neat late off drive." He did not bowl regularly after 1889, saving his energy for fielding. In 46 first-class matches, he scored 1,439 runs at an average of 17.76, took 15 wickets at an average of 14.40 and held 42 catches.

== Legal career ==
In 1893, Jardine was called to the Bar by the Middle Temple in 1893. He returned to India, where he practised at the Bombay Bar until 1916. At the time, British barristers dominated the Indian legal system, finding considerable financial reward, but causing resentment among the Indian legal profession. At the same time, Jardine held positions of increasing influence in India. He was Perry Professor of Jurisprudence and Roman Law from 1898 to 1902 and then Principal of the Government Law School until 1903. Subsequently, he was Clerk of the Crown, before being appointed Advocate General of Bombay in 1915 before retiring from India in 1916.

In 1898, he married Alison Moir and they had one son, Douglas in 1900, who went on to play first-class and Test cricket for Surrey and England. Eventually, Douglas became a controversial England captain, introducing a form of hostile bowling known as Bodyline. The family lived in a wealthy area of Bombay and were well known in its social and sporting circle. With Douglas at Public School, Jardine and his wife returned to England in 1916. He took an interest in the Surrey team, becoming a member and later a vice-president. His wife died in 1936 while Jardine died in South Kensington on 16 January 1947.

== Bibliography ==
- Douglas, Christopher (2002). Douglas Jardine: Spartan Cricketer. London: Methuen. ISBN 0-413-77216-0.
- Fry, C.B. (1986) [1939]. Life Worth Living. Some Phases of an Englishman. London: The Pavilion Library. ISBN 1-85145-026-2.
- Wilde, Simon (1999). Ranji. The Strange Genius of Ranjitsinhji. London: Aurum Press. ISBN 1-84513-069-3.
