= TS Mercury =

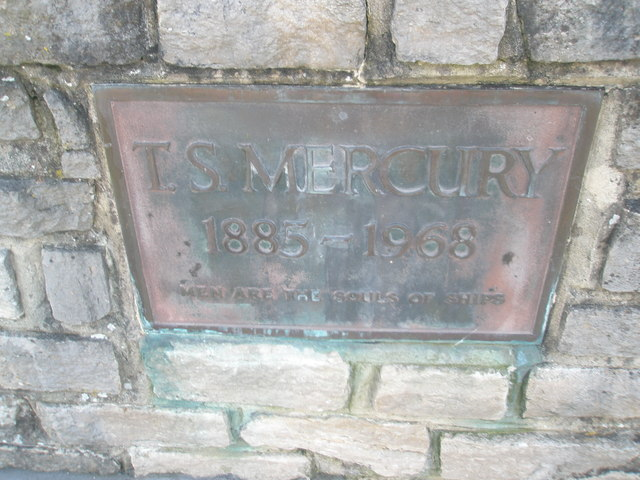
Memorial plaque in Mercury Gardens, Hamble

The Training Ship Mercury, or TS Mercury, was a naval training establishment founded as a ship in 1885 and then a shore-based school at Hamble in Hampshire from 1892 until its closure in July 1968. Although one of over thirty pre-sea training schools founded during the Victorian period, it was the only privately owned establishment training boys for both the Royal and Merchant Navies.

== History ==
The Training Ship Mercury was one of a number of similar, mostly static training ships located round the coasts of Britain and founded during the Victorian period to provide boy recruits for the Royal Navy and mercantile marine. It was founded in 1885 as a charitable venture by Charles Arthur Richard Hoare, a partner in the banking firm of C. Hoare & Co, with the objective of rescuing poor boys of good character and training them for naval service. Initially the facility was based at Binstead on the Isle of Wight where the boys lived in the barque Illovo, which was renamed Mercury. Over the years the establishment was increasingly managed by Charles Hoare's mistress Beatrice Holme Sumner, with whom he was to have a son (Robin Hoare) and a daughter. The entire establishment was moved from Binstead to Hamble near Southampton in 1892.

In June 1898, Beatrice Holme-Sumner married C. B. Fry, the great England cricketer and all-round sportsman, and in 1908, after the death of Hoare, Fry became the Mercury's Captain-Superintendent. In 1914, the former Royal Navy sloop HMS Gannet was loaned from the Admiralty for use mainly as a floating dormitory and the old Illovo was sold in 1916. In 1950 C.B. Fry retired and handed over command of TS Mercury to Commander Matthew Bradby RN Rtd.

Its last Captain Superintendent was Commander R. F. Hoyle RNR who took charge in 1960 and operated it for eight years before TS Mercury was closed in 1968. The 45-acre (180,000 m^{2}) shore establishment was later cleared for a housing development. Memorials to TS Mercury and the 5,000 boys it trained for service at sea in both the Royal and Merchant Navies are located at Hamble Parish Church and near the former TS Mercury slipway. HMS Gannet was towed out of the Hamble River in 1970 and is now restored and preserved at the Chatham Historic Dockyard.

== Sources ==
- White, A. L., The Training Ship Mercury; A History, The T.S. Mercury Old Boys' Association, 2003 ISBN 0-9548009-0-7
- Morris, R., The Indomitable Beatie, Sutton Publishing, 2004, ISBN 0-7509-3710-6
