= Beatrice Holme Sumner =

English eccentric (1862–1946)

Beatrice Holme Sumner (12 July 1862 – 23 April 1946) was an English eccentric and, for some sixty years, the manager of a training ship for boys: TS Mercury. As the lover of Charles Hoare, she was a controversial figure in Victorian society of the 1880s and 1890s and was later the wife of C. B. Fry.

== Early life ==
Sumner was born in Chelsea, Middlesex, on 12 July 1862, the daughter of Arthur Holme Sumner, of Hatchlands Park, East Clandon, Surrey, and his wife Georgina, into a family with notable and royal ancestors. She was christened at East Clandon on 7 September 1862.

Becoming known as a beauty, at the age of sixteen Sumner came out into society and fell in love with Charles Hoare, Senior Partner in the C. Hoare & Co private bank. Hoare was almost twice her age and was already married, with five children.

On the day of the Census of 3 April, 1881, Sumner is recorded as an eighteen-year old visitor in the household of Hoare and his wife Margaret in Cirencester.

Sumner’s father responded to this romance by banishing her to live with his sister at Berkeley Castle, and when that failed to work he had her declared a ward of court.

Arthur Holme Sumner was heavily in debt, and Georgina Sumner demanded £3,000 from Hoare and departed for Germany, with her daughter Beatrice and her brother-in-law “Fitz”, Francis Berkeley, Lord FitzHardinge. However, unknown to her Fitz had himself borrowed money from Hoare and thereafter acted as a go-between for the forbidden lovers. In 1883 Sumner’s father rented out Hatchlands Park, in the hope of being able to live on the income from it, but he sold the property five years later.

== Life with Hoare ==
In July 1883, Sumner arrived at the age of twenty-one and was no longer under the orders of the court. She immediately moved in with Hoare, and their daughter Sybil was born on 23 June 1884. In 1885 their relationship came under strain when the newspapers reported a case against Hoare for contempt of court brought by Sumner’s uncle Colonel Kingscote, as her family had obtained evidence that the lovers had not obeyed an order of the court forbidding them any contact before Sumner came of age. At the hearing, the judge declined to commit Hoare to prison, but he was ordered to pay Kingscote’s costs. The ensuing scandal ruined the reputations of all concerned, with Sumner’s father retreating to Malta, her mother to Geneva, where she stayed for the rest of her life, and Colonel Kingscote resigning his seat in parliament by being appointed as Commissioner of Woods, Forests and Land Revenues.

== T. S. Mercury ==
In 1883, Sumner’s younger brother Berkeley Holme Sumner (1872–1942) had joined the Royal Navy, and he eventually rose to the rank of Captain.

In 1885, Hoare founded Training Ship Mercury, at Binstead on the Isle of Wight, as an educational charity aimed at training poor boys of good character for naval service, and Sumner and Hoare moved together to be near the ship. The establishment was effectively under the control of Sumner from 1885 until her death in 1946, and the boys were “hounded from morn to night”. She subjected them to many hardships, including violent ceremonial floggings and forced boxing matches used as punishments.

Hoare was dismissed as senior partner of his bank in 1888, and on 26 September 1890 Sumner gave birth to Hoare’s son, Robin Hoare. In 1892 Mercury, with Hoare as superintendent, moved to Hamble-le-Rice.

Hoare invited well-known sportsmen to visit the school, including the England cricketer C. B. Fry. Beatrice noted in her diary for that day "Charles Fry came to play cricket today. I like Fry". In June 1898, following Sumner's marriage to Fry, Hoare retired to West Meon, leaving Sumner again in sole charge of Mercury.

== Married life ==
Sumner was ten years older than C. B. Fry, who came into the marriage deep in debt, and she was very much the dominant partner. The Frys were quickly a well-known society “power couple“ and had three children, including the cricketer Stephen Fry, born in 1900. For the first ten years, Fry worked as a journalist, and in December 1908 he was given the title of Captain Superintendent of Mercury.

Sumner was known for her ”fiery, strong-willed, aggressive” personality and was later described as “a cruel and domineering woman”. Fry was reported to live in fear of her throughout their long marriage, as she made him ”thoroughly miserable”, and he began to stay away from his wife as much as he could.

When Fry’s friend Ranjitsinhji, ruler of Nawanagar, became one of India's representatives at the newly formed League of Nations in 1921, he took Fry with him as his assistant.

The marriage had an impact on C. B. Fry's mental health, and his daughter-in-law later commented: “I should think anyone would have a breakdown, married to her".

Mrs Fry died in 1946, at the Royal South Hampshire and Southampton Hospital, leaving an estate valued at £10,362, equivalent to £542,907 in 2023, and probate was granted in September to her elder son Keith Robin Hoare, Commander RNVR.

== Aftermath ==
After a marriage lasting forty-eight years, C. B. Fry adjusted to his wife’s death “with great equanimity”. Her middle-aged children showed “all the freedom of the newly liberated”.
