= Alexander S. Hoare =

British banker

- Education: University of Edinburgh
- Occupation: Banker
- Known for: Chief Executive of C. Hoare & Co

Alexander S. Hoare is a British banker. He served as the chief executive of C. Hoare & Co from 2001 to 2009.

== Life and career ==
Hoare received a Bachelor of Commerce in marketing from the University of Edinburgh. He then worked as a marketing consultant for PA Consulting Group.

In 1987, he joined his family's bank, C. Hoare & Co. He was its chief executive from 2001 to 2009, and he has been on its board as a managing partner since 2009.

Hoare formerly served as the president of the Groupement Européen de Banques. He was also on the board of directors of the Jupiter Green Investment Trust. He is an Associate of the Chartered Institute of Bankers (ACIB).

== Not for profit & philanthropic organisations ==
He has served on the boards of trustees of organisations like the Royal Trinity Hospice, and job training charity Training for Life (which went into voluntary administration in 2012).

Hoare was also a member of the Finance and advisory council of Westminster Abbey.
