= Henry Palairet =

English cricketer and archer

Personal information
- Full name: Henry Hamilton Palairet
- Born: 8 January 1845; Bradford-on-Avon, Wiltshire, England
- Died: 20 March 1923 (aged 78); Cattistock, Dorset, England
- Role: Wicket-keeper
- Relatives: Lionel Palairet (son); Richard Palairet (son)

Domestic team information
- Years: Team
- 1868–1869: MCC

Career statistics
Competition	First-class
Matches	2
Runs scored	28
Batting average	9.33
100s/50s	0/0
Top score	14*
Catches/stumpings	2/0
- Source: Cricinfo, 7 May 2021

Henry Hamilton Palairet JP (8 January 1845 – 20 March 1923) was an English first-class cricketer and archer.

The son of Septimus Henry Palairet, he was born at Bradford-on-Avon in January 1845. He was educated at Eton College, before going up to Exeter College, Oxford. Though he did not play cricket for Oxford University Cricket Club, he did play for Exeter College as a wicket-keeper. At Oxford he was a member of the Exeter College Boat Club and trialled as an eighth rower for the 1865 Boat Race, but did not make the final team. He played first-class cricket for the Marylebone Cricket Club in 1868 and 1869, playing two matches against Lancashire and Hampshire, scoring 28 runs with a highest score of 14 not out. His interests in cricket extended to Somerset County Cricket Club, where for many years he served on the club committee, often chairing club meetings.

Palairet excelled as an archer, winning the English Archery Championships five times in 1876, 1878 and three years running from 1880 to 1882. He also won the John O'Gaunts competition on five occasions. Palairet was also secretary to the archery committee at the All England Club. He settled at Cattistock in Dorset in 1873 and was a member of the local Conservative Party, in addition to being a judge in the Court of Assizes at Bath, Somerset. He married Elizabeth Ann Bigg in 1869, with the couple having five children. Among those were the cricketers Lionel Palairet and Richard Palairet. Palairet died at Cattistock in March 1923. His brother was the British Army general Charles Palairet.
