= Lionel Palairet =

English cricketer (1870–1933)

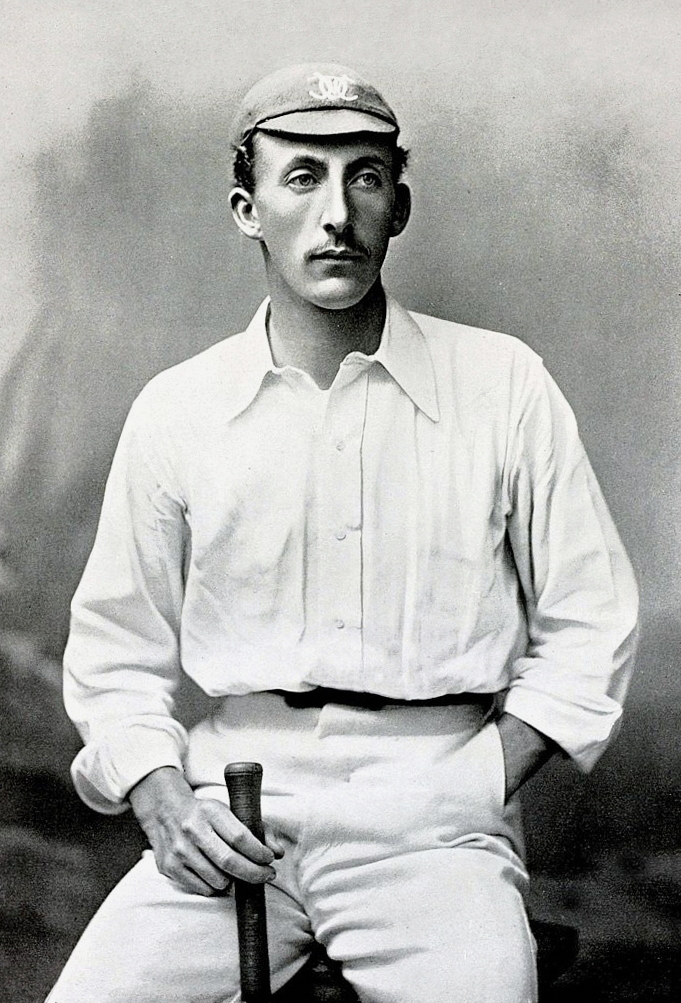
- Palairet n about 1895

Personal information
- Full name: Lionel Charles Hamilton Palairet
- Born: 27 May 1870; Grange-over-Sands, Lancashire, England
- Died: 27 March 1933 (aged 62); Exmouth, Devon, England
- Batting: Right-handed
- Bowling: Right arm medium; Right arm slow (underarm)
- Relatives: Henry Palairet (father); Richard Palairet (brother)

International information
- National side: England
- Test debut (cap 134): 24 July 1902 v Australia
- Last Test: 11 August 1902 v Australia

Domestic team information
- Years: Team
- 1890–1909: Somerset
- 1890–1893: Oxford University

Career statistics
Competition	Test	First-class
Matches	2	267
Runs scored	49	15,777
Batting average	12.25	33.63
100s/50s	0/0	27/83
Top score	20	292
Balls bowled	–	8,781
Wickets	–	143
Bowling average	–	33.90
5 wickets in innings	–	2
10 wickets in match	–	0
Best bowling	–	6/84
Catches/stumpings	2/–	248/14
- Source: ESPNcricinfo, 19 November 2012

Lionel Charles Hamilton Palairet (27 May 1870 – 27 March 1933) was an English amateur cricketer who played for Somerset and Oxford University. A graceful right-handed batsman, he was selected to play Test cricket for England twice in 1902. Contemporaries judged Palairet to have one of the most attractive batting styles of the period. His obituary in The Times described him as "the most beautiful batsman of all time". An unwillingness to tour during the English winter limited Palairet's Test appearances; contemporaries believed he deserved more Test caps.

Palairet was educated at Repton School. He played in the school cricket team for four years, as captain in the latter two, before going to Oriel College, Oxford. He achieved his cricketing Blue in each of his four years at Oxford, and captained the team in 1892 and 1893. For Somerset, he frequently opened the batting with Herbie Hewett. In 1892, they shared a partnership of 346 for the first wicket, an opening stand that set a record for the County Championship and remains Somerset's highest first-wicket partnership. (Note: As of September 2013.) In that season, Palairet was named as one of the "Five Batsmen of the Year" by Wisden.

Over the following decade, he was one of the leading amateur batsmen in England. He passed 1,000 first-class runs in a season on seven occasions, and struck two double centuries. His highest score, 292 runs against Hampshire in 1895, remained a record for a Somerset batsman until 1948. His only Test matches were the fourth and fifth Tests against Australia in 1902: Australia won the fourth Test by three runs, and England won the fifth Test by one wicket. After 1904, he appeared infrequently for Somerset, though he played a full season in 1907 when he was chosen to captain the county. He retired from first-class cricket in 1909, having scored over 15,000 runs.

== Early life ==
Lionel Palairet was born in Grange-over-Sands, a popular seaside resort in Lancashire, on 27 May 1870. He was the oldest of five children born to Henry Hamilton Palairet and Elizabeth Anne Bigg. His father, of Huguenot ancestry, was five times archery champion of England, and a keen cricketer who made two first-class appearances for the Marylebone Cricket Club (MCC) in the late 1860s. Palairet was educated first at the Reverend S. Cornish's School in Clevedon, Somerset, where he once took seven wickets in seven successive deliveries, and then at Repton School. At Repton he developed a reputation as an all-round sportsman: he broke the school's running records in the two-mile, mile and half-mile distances, and played cricket in the school's first eleven from 1886 to 1889, captaining the team in his final two years. In 1889, he was adjudged the school's second best sportsman, behind only C. B. Fry. During his final year at Repton, he had a batting average of over 29, and took 56 wickets at an average of under 13.

Some of Palairet's early success can be attributed to his father, who paid the professionals Frederick Martin and William Attewell, both later Wisden Cricketers of the Year, to bowl at his two sons during the Easter holidays, to help them prepare for the upcoming cricket season. During the later part of the 1889 season, Palairet made his first appearances for Somerset County Cricket Club. At the time, Somerset were a second-class county, and their fixture list that summer was against a variety of first- and second-class opposition. Although a Lancastrian by birth, Palairet's family home was at Cattistock in Dorset, and it was in the south west that he chose to play his cricket. On completion of his studies at Repton, he attended Oriel College, Oxford.

== Cricket career ==
=== University and county cricketer ===
Palairet was selected for the university cricket team during his first year at Oxford, and made his first-class debut against the touring Australians in May 1890. Palairet scored six and nought and took one wicket in the match which Australia won by an innings. In his next match, Palairet improved, top-scoring for Oxford in their first innings against the Gentlemen with his first half-century in first-class cricket, 54 runs batting at number eight. He only passed 50 runs in one other innings for Oxford that summer, a score of 72 against the MCC, and in all matches for the university that season scored 285 runs at an average of 19.00. Batting averages in 1890 were lower than usual due to the poor weather, and Palairet's average placed him fourth among Oxford's team; his 285-run total was the team's second highest aggregate. Palairet won his Blue—the awarding of the Oxford "colours" to sportsmen—by appearing in the 1890 University match against Cambridge, a game in which he had little success. Somerset played thirteen matches in the season, won twelve of them and tied the other. Palairet played in ten of these games, and on his first appearance scored a century against Leicestershire. Somerset's achievements led to their admission to first-class cricket for 1891.

Oxford's batting was described by the Oxford cricket historian Geoffrey Bolton as "unreliable" during 1891, Palairet's second year at the university. Palairet's batting average of 15.78 placed him fifth amongst his peers, and he once again struggled in the university match, scoring two and eleven. Although he generally batted as part of the middle order for Oxford, he invariably opened the innings for Somerset alongside his captain, Herbie Hewett. In this role he thrived for Somerset; his average for the county in ten matches was 31.11, placing him among the top ten batsmen in the County Championship. He scored his debut century in first-class cricket that year, with 100 runs against Gloucestershire. Palairet had agreed to tour North America with Lord Hawke's party, but he demurred late, and was replaced by Somerset teammate Sammy Woods.

In 1892 Palairet was elected captain of the Oxford team, and according to Wisden, "had a most brilliant season." Palairet used himself heavily as a bowler for the university; only George Berkeley bowled more deliveries. He took five wickets in an innings for the first of two occasions during his career in the first innings of Oxford's match against the Gentlemen, and followed it up with four wickets in each innings against Lancashire, a match in which he also scored a half-century. He recorded the best bowling figures of his first-class career in the return match against Lancashire, taking six wickets for 84 runs at Old Trafford, and in the following game against Sussex, Bolton says, "Palairet played two beautiful innings and bowled to some effect". Facing Cambridge in the university match, he was out without scoring in the first innings, but centuries from Malcolm Jardine and Vernon Hill took Oxford to 365. Cambridge were dismissed for 160, and were forced to follow on, whereupon they reached 388, leaving Oxford requiring 184 runs to win. Palairet, who had injured himself while fielding, opted not to open the batting, promoting Frank Phillips in his place. Oxford started poorly, falling to 17 for two, but coming in at number five, Palairet batted for an hour and a half to score 71 runs and help his team to victory. He topped the batting averages for Oxford in 1892, scoring 509 runs at 36.35, and his 28 wickets came at 22.28.

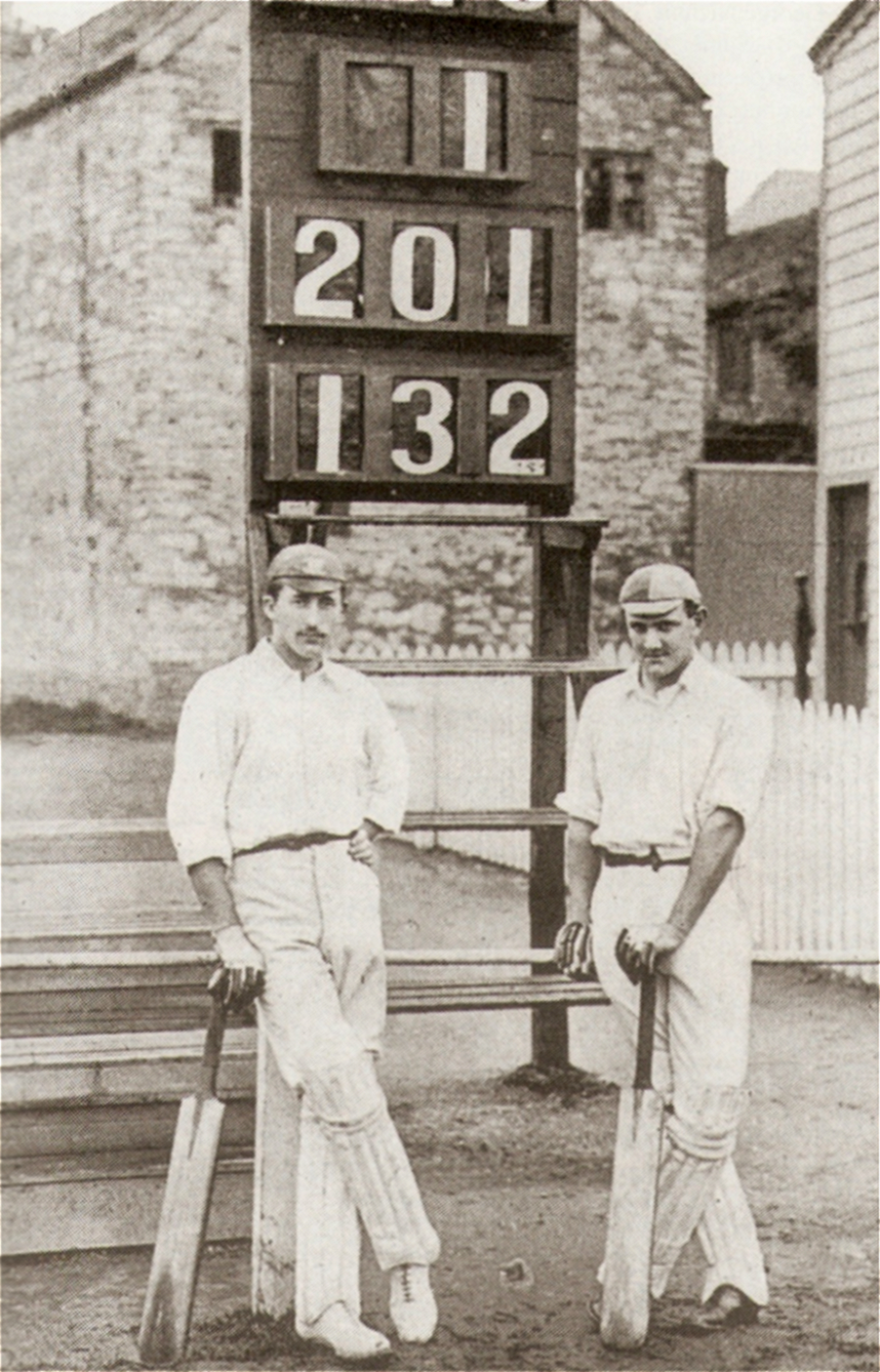
Palairet (left) with Herbie Hewett after their record first-wicket partnership of 346 against Yorkshire in 1892

Palairet's university performances were good enough to earn him selection for the Gentlemen against the Players in the prestigious matches at Lord's and The Oval. Returning to Somerset, he struck a century against Gloucestershire in early July, In late August, playing Yorkshire, Palairet scored 132 out of a partnership of 346 with Hewett, establishing a record for the first wicket in first-class cricket, surpassing W. G. Grace and Bransby Cooper's 1869 total of 283. Although their record has since been beaten in first-class cricket, it remains Somerset's record partnership for the first wicket. Their partnership was described as "Pure grace at one end, sheer force at the other", in H.S. Altham and E. W. Swanton's A History of Cricket. At the time, The Daily Telegraph reported that the pair remained together for three and a half hours, during which Palairet scored one six and nineteen fours. At the end of the season, he was selected in two representative teams: appearing for the West against the East, and once again for the Gentlemen against the Players, on this occasion at Hastings. In all first-class matches that year, he scored 1,343 runs, the third most of any cricketer. He was named as one of the Five Batsmen of the Year by the Wisden Cricketers' Almanack in 1893, which noted that "there can be little doubt that even greater distinction awaits him in the cricket world."

In contrast to the previous year, 1893 was an unsuccessful one for Oxford. The university team failed to win a single match, and despite favourable batting conditions, none of the batsmen scored a century. Palairet was second in the batting averages, scoring 276 runs at 21.23. Bolton questioned the team selections that year under Palairet's captaincy, particularly for the university match, in which he believed a stronger team could have been chosen. Cambridge had a powerful team, containing eight of their players from the previous year, and adding Arthur Jones and K. S. Ranjitsinhji. Oxford lost the match by 266 runs, with only Palairet and Fry scoring more than 12 runs for the team.

In his four years at Oxford, Palairet appeared for the university 31 times in first-class cricket and accrued 1,291 runs at an average of 23.05. He scored nine half-centuries, with a top-score of 75 not out. He claimed 52 wickets at 25.03—significantly lower than his career average—and took the only five-wicket hauls of his career. While at Oxford, he also gained a Blue in athletics, running in the three-mile race against Cambridge in 1892. The same year, he played association football for Corinthians, and there were also appearances for Combined Universities and London. An injury prevented Palairet from playing against Cambridge, and thus earning his Blue in football.

=== Leading amateur batsman ===
Over the following seasons, Palairet moved to "the front rank of amateur batsmen," according to W. G. Grace. He played for Arthur Shrewsbury's England XI against Australia in 1893, and scored 71 runs as the English team won by an innings and 153 runs. (Note: "Arthur Shrewsbury's England XI" was not a representative national team.) He scored five half-centuries for Somerset that summer, and his batting average of 28.94 in the County Championship was bettered only by Hewett among his teammates. The next year, Palairet made a big score against his former university. Facing a team that included his brother, Richard Palairet, and was captained by Fry, he made 181 runs in Somerset's second innings, the highest first-class score of his career to that point. He also scored a century against Nottinghamshire, making 119 runs before being out leg before wicket to his old trainer Attewell. He fell just short of 1,000 first-class runs in 1894; though two half-centuries scored against the touring South Africans in matches not considered first-class would have taken him over the milestone.

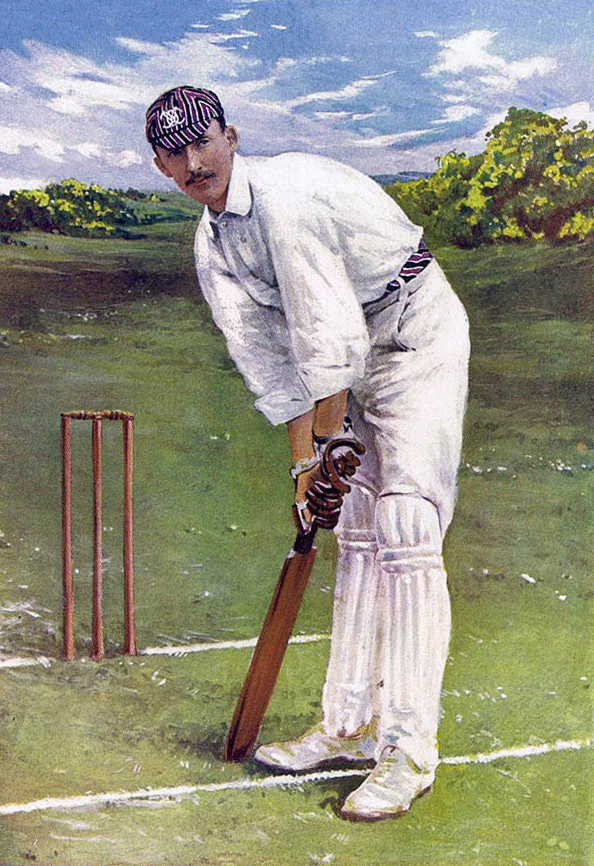
Palairet, pictured in Cricket of Today and Yesterday in 1902

In 1895, Palairet was fourth in the national batting averages, (Note: Amongst batsmen with over 1,000 first-class runs.) having scored 1,313 runs at 46.89. The three batsmen above him, Archie MacLaren, Grace and Ranjitsinhji all appeared for England that year. Palairet scored three centuries during the season; two against Middlesex, on the latter occasion batting undefeated through the whole Somerset innings, and one against Yorkshire, when he struck 165. He passed a thousand runs again the following year, maintaining a batting average in excess of 40. A fourth-innings score of 83 not out that season drew praise from Ranjitsinhji; on a difficult pitch, Palairet farmed the strike and rescued a draw for his team. Just over a month later, he reached his highest total in first-class cricket, scoring 292 runs against Hampshire. It was his first double century, and the highest score by any Somerset batsman in first-class cricket at that time. (Note: Palairet's score was surpassed as the highest for Somerset by Harold Gimblett in 1948, and as of December 2012, is the ninth highest score by a Somerset player.) One newspaper in Australia, reporting on his innings, declared that; "should he retain his form he will certainly be worthy of a place ... in the final Test match at the Oval." Either team of that match against Hampshire, he appeared for the Gentlemen against the Players at The Oval and Lord's, but made little impact on either game. He returned to form against Sussex on their visit to Taunton, sharing a 249-run partnership with his brother, and scoring 154 runs himself. The match was played shortly before the final Test match against Australia, but despite the comments in the Australian press, Palairet was not selected for the match. He did appear twice against the tourists that summer, for Somerset he scored six across two innings, and chosen to play for Charles Thornton's XI during the Scarborough Festival, he scored 71 runs in an innings victory.

In 1897 Palairet made fewer first-class appearances, playing in only 12 matches. He scored 593 runs at an average just below 30, the only time between 1895 and 1906 that his average was below that value. Despite this relatively quiet season, Somerset still relied heavily on him; he led the county batting averages in the 1897 County Championship. In 1898, Palairet topped 1,000 first-class runs for the third season out of four. He struck 179 not out against Gloucestershire in Bristol, and late in the season, also against Gloucestershire, he captained Somerset for the first time, leading them to victory by an innings and 169 runs. He played in two matches during the Scarborough Festival, in which he scored 54, his highest innings for the Gentlemen against the Players, and also appeared for Thornton's "England XI" against that season's county champions, Yorkshire.

Palairet missed all of the 1899 season through appendicitis; Baily's Magazine of Sports & Pastimes suggested that but for this he might have appeared for England against Australia that summer. He returned in 1900, scoring 947 runs at an average of 35.07. His only century came against Hampshire, when he scored 161 runs, and shared a partnership of 262 with Charles Bernard.

The subsequent 1901 season was, statistically, his best. He trailed only Fry and Ranjitsinhji in the national batting averages, and drew particular acclaim for his innings of 173 against Yorkshire. The all-conquering Yorkshire were reigning County Champions, unbeaten in 1900; the match against Somerset at Headingley was the only one they lost in 1901. Somerset were dismissed for 87 in their first innings, and Yorkshire reached 325 to lead by 238 runs on first innings. Palairet and his fellow opener Len Braund—both of whom had been out without scoring in the first innings—then scored 222 runs together in 140 minutes at the start of Somerset's second innings, each scoring a century. After the dismissal of Braund for 107, Palairet continued, eventually being caught and bowled for 173. Frank Phillips added a third century (122), and Somerset reached a total of 630. Yorkshire were bowled out on a wearing pitch for 113, with Braund and Beaumont Cranfield each taking four wickets, and Somerset won by 279 runs. The Yorkshire captain, Lord Hawke, declared that it was "one of the best matches I ever lost." In the same year, Palairet scored 182 against Lancashire and 194 against Sussex. Altogether he scored five centuries and eleven half-centuries in 1901, averaging 57.75 for his 1,906 runs—the highest season's total of his career.

=== England recognition ===
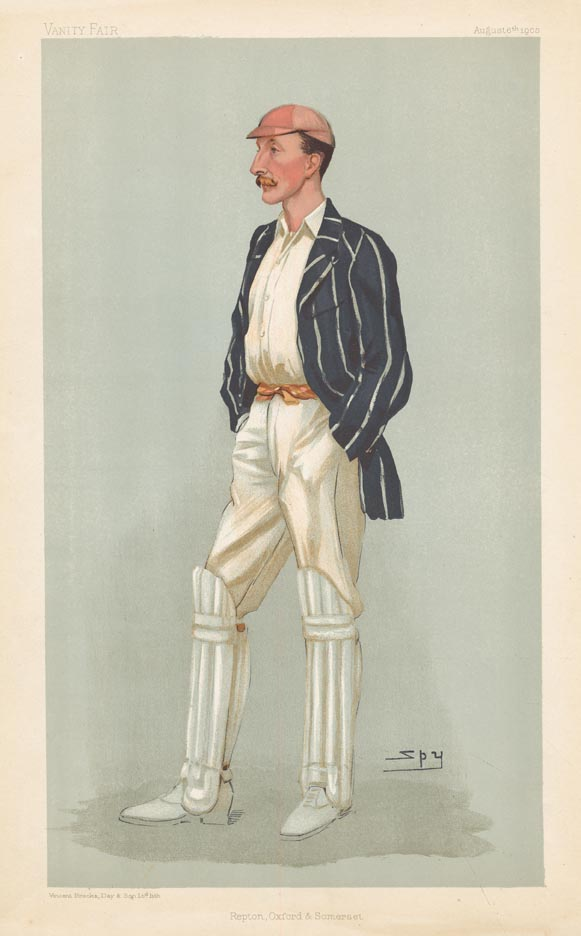
Palairet caricatured by Spy for Vanity Fair, 1903

The English summer of 1902 was badly affected by rain, making batting more difficult. Through the whole season, Palairet did not score a first-class century, though he did score over 1,000 runs. He was once again instrumental in inflicting defeat on Yorkshire: on what Sir Home Gordon described as a "rain-ruined wicket", Palairet scored 25 and 24 during a match in which only Braund also reached double-figure scores in both innings. Wisden described the pair's batting as "admirable", and it helped secure a Somerset victory by 34 runs; for the second successive year, Somerset were the only team to beat Yorkshire in the County Championship.

Palairet was selected to appear for the Marylebone Cricket Club against the touring Australians in the week prior to the first Test of the series. He scored 39 and 44 in a drawn match. He was not chosen to play in any of the first three Tests, but was called up for the fourth match, at Old Trafford. Palairet, Ranjitsinhji and Fred Tate replaced Fry, George Hirst and Gilbert Jessop; the Wisden match report indicates that dropping Fry was a necessary decision, but that Hirst and Jessop should both have played. In A History of Cricket, Altham is more direct in claiming that Palairet should not have been chosen: "The selectors, it is now agreed, made a questionable choice in preferring Lionel Palairet to an all-rounder such as Hirst." On his Test debut, Palairet opened the batting and scored six runs in the first innings, one of five victims to fall to Jack Saunders and Hugh Trumble in the first 45 minutes of England's innings. In the second innings, Palairet once again opened, though with a different partner: MacLaren replaced Bobby Abel. The pair made scored 44 runs together, though Wisden noted that "the difficulty they experienced in playing the bowling made one apprehensive". Palairet was bowled by Saunders, and England were eventually dismissed for 120, four runs short of victory.

For the next Test match—the fifth and final of the series—Palairet retained his place, with Hirst and Jessop restored to the team. The Australians batted throughout the first day for a total of 324 runs. Overnight rain then made batting difficult, and England totalled 183 on the second day. Palairet was dismissed for 20 by Trumble, whose bowling Altham praised as magnificent. Australia also struggled in their second innings, and England required 263 runs to win the match. Palairet was dismissed for six, the third batsman to be bowled by Trumble in the innings, at which point England's score was 10 for 3 wickets. Lower order runs from the recalled Jessop and Hirst recovered the innings, and England won by one wicket. In Palairet's only other match against Australia that summer, for Somerset, he scored 44 and 90 in a drawn game at Taunton. He made no further Test appearances, and completed his brief Test career with 49 runs at an average of 12.25, against an Australian team that has been described as among the best Test teams prior to the Second World War.

=== Later county career ===
In 1903, Palairet played eleven first-class matches. His only century of the season came against Surrey, when he scored 114 in the second innings, having struck a half-century in the first. He passed 50 on three other occasions, and finished the year with 637 runs at 35.38. He appeared more frequently the following year, in which he scored 1,000 first-class runs in a season for the final time of his career. He opened the season with a century against Gloucestershire, scoring 166 runs. During the Bath cricket festival, he scored 111, and shared an opening partnership of 161 with Braund during a ten-wicket loss to Lancashire. Against Worcestershire later that month, he scored the second, and final, first-class double century of his career. Opening the batting for Somerset, he reached 203; more than Worcestershire had managed in their first innings, before being dismissed. Somerset won the match by an innings and 114 runs. The cricket historian David Foot describes 1904 and the subsequent few seasons as undistinguished for Somerset; between then and the First World War, the club never finished higher than tenth in the County Championship. Palairet missed most of the cricket in 1905 and 1906, to concentrate on his work as a land agent for the Earl of Devon. He played three times in 1905; against the touring Australians, Kent and Warwickshire, while in 1906 he played one match, against Yorkshire. At the end of 1906, Woods, who had captained Somerset since 1894, retired. Despite his limited appearances over the previous couple of years, Palairet was appointed as Woods' replacement for 1907.

During the 1907 season, Palairet played in all of Somerset's County Championship matches, and also appeared for the county against the touring South African team. The club struggled to find eleven eligible players for some of their matches, and at one stage were forced to recall Ted Tyler to the team – Tyler had not played for Somerset for four years, and had only played five matches since 1900. Palairet himself had a disappointing year; his batting average of 21.33 was the lowest in any season in which he played ten or more matches. He passed 50 in an innings on only three occasions, one of these being 116 runs against Kent at Tonbridge, the final century of his first-class career. At the end of the season, in which Somerset finished fourteenth of sixteen teams in the County Championship, Palairet resigned the captaincy. At the club's annual general meeting, in an uncharacteristic outburst he criticised the lack of talent and team spirit . After 1907, made only eight further appearances in first-class cricket, his final match being in 1909 for Somerset against Kent at Taunton, where he scored one run in the first innings and three in the second. Palairet invariably wore a Harlequins cricket cap during matches, and was considered aloof by his colleagues. In his complete first-class career he scored 15,777 runs at an average of 33.63, including 27 centuries, and took 143 wickets at a bowling average of 33.91

== Style and technique ==
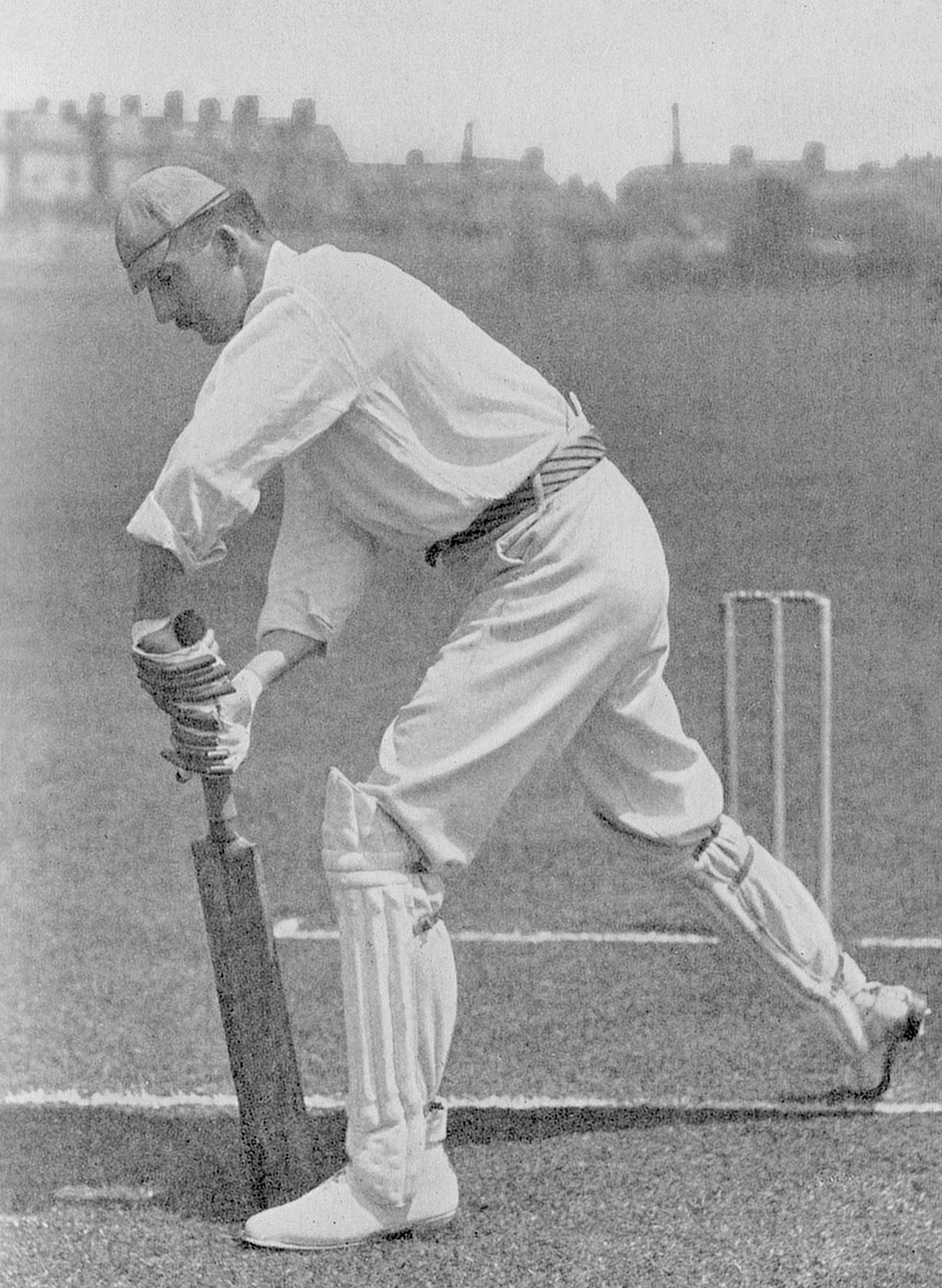
Palairet's cover drive was featured in The Jubilee Book of Cricket.

Often considered by commentators to be the benchmark against which other batsmen are compared for attractive, graceful batting, Palairet won many plaudits for his style. In his book, The Jubilee Book of Cricket, Ranjitsinhji includes a number of staged photographs of Palairet playing his shots, and describes his methods in places, using them as the model which young players should adopt. He played predominantly off the front foot, (Note: A batsman is said to "play off the front foot" when their weight is over their front foot, which is the one furthest from the stumps, and closest to the bowler.) and tended to be less effective on soft pitches. He favoured shots on the off side, particularly the off drive and cover drive. During Palairet's career, bowlers favoured a tactic, known as off theory, of bowling the ball just outside the off stump. The strength of Palairet's off side strokes helped him to score effectively against this tactic. Fry suggests that the early practice that Palairet gained against Attewell and Martin, who bowled accurately at the stumps, was a key factor in limiting his range of leg side shots. He favoured lofted shots which were often compared to golf strokes.

For a time early in his career, he attempted to play more powerfully, but then returned to his forward style. Despite this, he remained capable of hitting the ball out of the County Ground in Taunton and into the River Tone at one end or the churchyard at the other. Although considered a stylish batsman, Palairet was described by Foot as having "the minimum of extrovert flourish" and "no quaint mannerisms", both factors he considered relevant in Palairet's limited Test appearances. Throughout his career, Palairet shunned improvisation, and played well-established, orthodox cricket shots. He remained absolutely still at the crease while preparing to play a shot, a feature later seen in Viv Richards' batting.

== Personal life ==
Palairet married Caroline Mabel Laverton, the daughter of William Henry Laverton, a prominent cricket patron in Wiltshire, in 1894. The pair had two children: Evelyn Mabel Hamilton, born in 1895, and Henry Edward Hamilton the following year. Palairet's brother, Richard, played first-class cricket for Somerset between 1891 and 1902, albeit without as much success as Lionel. In addition to cricket, Palairet maintained an interest in a range of other sports; a 1901 profile of him in Baily's Magazine records that foxhunting was his primary sporting interest. After his retirement from cricket, Palairet became a prominent golfer in the south-west. He was the first chairman of the Devon County Golf Union upon its formation in 1911, captained Devon at golf either team of the First World War, from 1914 through until 1926, and was also president of the Union from 1923 until 1932. He developed the idea of an inter-club team championship within Devon, and donated the prize, which remains named the Palairet Trophy. During the First World War, he had command of a Remount Depot at Powderham, the seat of the Earl of Devon. He died in Exmouth on 27 March 1933, aged 62.

== Bibliography ==
- Altham, H.S.; Swanton, E.W. (1938) [1926]. A History of Cricket (Second ed.). London: George Allen & Unwin Ltd. OCLC 316121857.
- Bolton, Geoffrey (1962). History of the O.U.C.C. (First ed.). Oxford: Holywell Press Ltd. OCLC 75422.
- Chesterton, George; Doggart, Hubert (1989). Oxford and Cambridge Cricket. London: Willow Books. ISBN 0-00-218295-5.
- Foot, David (1986). Sunshine, Sixes and Cider: The History of Somerset Cricket. Newton Abbot, Devon: David & Charles. ISBN 0-7153-8890-8.
- Green, Benny, ed. (1979). Wisden Anthology 1862–1900. London: Queen Anne Press. ISBN 0-354-08555-7.
- Green, Benny, ed. (1980). Wisden Anthology 1900–1940. London: Queen Anne Press. ISBN 0-362-00513-3.
- Ranjitsinhji, K. S. (1897). The Jubilee Book of Cricket. Edinburgh: W. Blackwood and Sons. OCLC 2207619.
- Roebuck, Peter (1991). From Sammy to Jimmy: The Official History of Somerset County Cricket Club. London: Partridge Press. ISBN 1-85225-085-2.

Sporting positions
Preceded by Sammy Woods	Somerset County Cricket Captain; 1907	Succeeded by John Daniell
