= Matthew Bradby =

English rugby union player (1899–1963)

- Full name: Matthew Seymour Bradby
- Born: 25 March 1899 Rugby, England
- Died: 11 June 1963 (aged 64) near Shatterbury, England
- School: Rugby School

Rugby union career
- Position: Centre
International career
Years	Team	Apps	(Points)
1922	England	2	(0)

Matthew Seymour Bradby (25 March 1899 – 11 June 1963) was an English international rugby union player.

Bradby was born in Rugby, Warwickshire, and educated at Rugby School, where his father was a master from 1892 to 1929, as well as the house master of School Field. He was the first England international produced by the Rugby Lions, gaining two caps as a centre in the 1922 Five Nations, and also played rugby in the Royal Navy.

A Royal Navy commander, Bradby was captain of Heswall Nautical School in Cheshire immediately after World War II and in 1950 became commanding officer of the training ship HMS Mercury.

== See also ==
- List of England national rugby union players
