= Charles Fry =

English cricketer and cricket administrator (1940–2024)

Personal information
- Full name: Charles Anthony Fry
- Born: 14 January 1940; Henley-in-Arden, Warwickshire, England
- Died: 27 October 2024 (aged 84); London, England
- Batting: Right-handed
- Bowling: Right-arm medium
- Role: Occasional wicket-keeper
- Relatives: Stephen Fry (father); C. B. Fry (grandfather)

Domestic team information
- Years: Team
- 1959–1961: Oxford University
- 1960: Hampshire
- 1962: Northamptonshire

Career statistics
Competition	First-class
Matches	50
Runs scored	1,952
Batting average	25.02
100s/50s	2/10
Top score	103*
Balls bowled	18
Wickets	0
Bowling average	–
5 wickets in innings	–
10 wickets in match	–
Best bowling	–
Catches/stumpings	38/0
- Source: Cricinfo, 25 September 2009

Charles Anthony Fry (14 January 1940 – 27 October 2024) was an English first-class cricketer and cricket administrator.

== Life and career ==
The son of the cricketer Stephen Fry and the grandson of the sportsman C. B. Fry, Charles Fry was born in January 1940 at Henley-in-Arden, Warwickshire. He was educated at Repton School, before matriculating to Trinity College, Oxford.

While studying at Oxford, Fry played first-class cricket for Oxford University Cricket Club, making his debut for the club against Yorkshire at Oxford in 1959. He scored 576 runs at an average of 26.18 in debut season, including a maiden century against the Free Foresters, sharing an unbroken fifth-wicket partnership of 256 with Abbas Ali Baig which remained a first-class record for the fifth wicket for Oxford until 2017, when it was broken by Dan Escott's and Matthew Naylor's partnership of 267. He gained his blue in this season, when he played against Cambridge University in The University Match at Lord's. The Oxford side of 1959 was considered the last great Oxford University side, with E. W. Swanton proffering that it was good enough to finish in the top half of the County Championship.

The following season, Fry made fifteen first-class appearances for Oxford in 1960 and made his second appearance in The University Match, which gained him his second blue. In his season, he scored 642 runs for Oxford and made his second century. Later in the season, he made five first-class appearances for Hampshire in the County Championship, scoring 134 runs with a highest score of 38. Against Sussex at Bournemouth, he was notably bowled by Robin Marlar, who would later become one of his successors to the presidency of the Marylebone Cricket Club (MCC). He followed in the footsteps of both his father and grandfather, C. B. Fry in playing for Hampshire. As of 2026, this remains the only instance of three generations of one family playing for the county. Fry did not, however, feature for Hampshire in their County Championship winning campaign the following season.

Fry played his third and final season for Oxford University in 1961, making twelve appearances and scoring 358 runs at an average of 18.84; his highest score in this season was 61. In his final year, he made his third appearance in The University Match and thus, gained his third blue. 41 of his 50 first-class appearances came for Oxford, with him scoring 1,576 runs for the university at an average of 24.24. The following season, having graduated from Oxford, he appeared twice for Northamptonshire against Cambridge University at Northampton, and Essex in the County Championship at Colchester. He later appeared twice for the Free Foresters in first-class cricket, against Oxford University in 1964 and 1968.

Fry had a long association with the MCC, succeeding Sir Tim Rice as its president in 2003. His tenure was not without controversy, with critics in the MCC claiming he ran club affairs akin to a dictator. At the end of his twelve-month presidency, he was succeeded by Tom Graveney, who was the first former professional cricketer to hold the post. In addition to holding the presidency, Fry was chairman of both the MCC and the MCC Foundation.

Fry worked in the financial sector, inventing and launching many products as an investment entrepreneur. He launched Johnson Fry, a mortgage and life insurance broker, in 1969. When he was forced out as chief executive, he started Pinder Fry & Benjamin, a firm of financial advisers, eventually retiring in 2005. He died from complications of Parkinson’s disease at home in London, on 27 October 2024, at the age of 84.
