= Stephen Fry (cricketer) =

English cricketer

Personal information
- Born: 23 May 1900; Chelsea, Middlesex, England
- Died: 18 May 1979 (aged 78); Notting Hill, London, England
- Batting: Right-handed
- Role: Wicket-keeper
- Relatives: C.B. Fry (father); Charles Fry (son)

Domestic team information
- Years: Team
- 1922–1931: Hampshire

Career statistics
Competition	First-class
Matches	29
Runs scored	508
Batting average	10.58
100s/50s	–/1
Top score	78
Catches/stumpings	16/1
- Source: Cricinfo, 27 December 2009

Stephen Hope Fry (23 May 1900 – 18 May 1979) was an English first-class cricketer.

The son of the cricketer C. B. Fry and his wife, Beatrice Holme Sumner, he was born at Chelsea in May 1900. Fry made his debut in first-class cricket for Hampshire against Sussex at Southampton in the 1922 County Championship. He made two further first-class appearances in 1922, against Oxford University and Surrey. A seven-year gap between his next appearance for Hampshire followed, with him resuming his first-class career in 1929, when he made fifteen appearances. He played for Hampshire in 1930 and 1931, though his appearances became less regular. He was an attacking batsman much like his father, however it was noted by Wisden that he "lacked his father's rare qualities to implement this philosophy". In 29 first-class matches for Hampshire, he scored 508 runs at an average of 10.58; he made one half century, a score of 78 against Warwickshire. Fry kept-wicket on occasion for Hampshire and stood in as captain for Lord Tennyson in 1931, being one of five captains used that season.

Fry later owned The Master Builder Hotel on the banks of the Beaulieu River in Buckler's Hard, alongside his wife, Yvonne. Fry died at Notting Hill in May 1979. His son, Charles, was also a first-class cricketer.
