= Charles Hoare (cricketer, born 1847) =

English banker and cricketer

Charles Arthur Richard Hoare (18 May 1847 – 22 May 1908) was an English banker who became a senior partner in the private bank C. Hoare & Co. He was a keen amateur cricketer who played one first-class cricket match for Kent County Cricket Club.

== Career ==
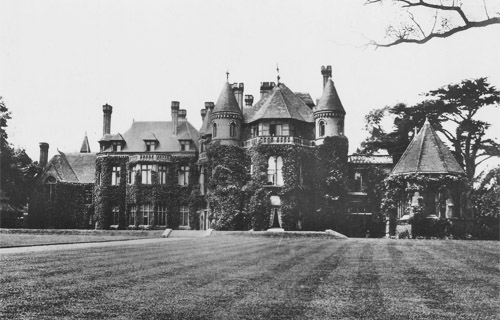
Kelsey Manor House

Hoare was born in Blackfriars in 1847; he was the son of Peter Richard Hoare, the younger and Lady Sophia Marsham (daughter of Charles Marsham, 2nd Earl of Romney). Hoare received no formal education on account of his lameness. He played cricket extensively in minor matches of teams such as Marylebone Cricket Club (MCC), having become a member of the club at the age of 18 in 1865, and made his only first-class cricket appearance in 1872 for Kent County Cricket Club in a twelve-a-side match against the MCC.

Following his father's death, in 1877, Hoare became Senior Partner of the banking firm C. Hoare & Co and owner of Kelsey Park in Beckenham. He also became Master of the Vale of White Horse Hunt and was President of Hampshire County Cricket Club for three years. In the late 1870s he began a relationship with Beatrice Holme Sumner, who at that time was a minor; the affair became public knowledge in 1885, when members of Sumner's family sought a court order restricting Hoare from continuing the relationship and demanding his committal to prison. The judge rejected the application to imprison Hoare.

In 1885 Hoare founded TS Mercury at Binstead on the Isle of Wight as a charitable venture formed with the objective of rescuing poor boys of good character and training them for naval service. After a sustained period of absence from the Bank, on account of his pursuit of his cricket, hunting and personal interests, Hoare was dismissed as Senior Partner of the Bank in 1888. The entire TS Mercury establishment, with Hoare as its superintendent, moved from Binstead to Hamble-le-Rice near Southampton in 1892. In June 1898, following Beatrice Holme-Sumner's marriage to the cricketer, C. B. Fry, Hoare retired to Hall Place, West Meon where he died in May 1908 aged 61 after a long illness.

== Family ==
In 1867 Hoare married Margaret Short; they had four sons and one daughter. He also had a son (Robin Hoare) and a daughter by his relationship with Beatrice Holme Sumner.

== Bibliography ==
- Carlaw, Derek (2020). Kent County Cricketers, A to Z: Part One (1806–1914) (PDF). Cardiff: ACS.
- Hutchings, Victoria (2005). Messrs Hoare, Bankers: A History of the Hoare Banking Dynasty. Constable. ISBN 1-84119-965-6.
- Morris, Ronald (2004). The Indomnitable Beattie. Sutton Publishing. ISBN 0-7509-3710-6.
