= C. B. Fry =

English sportsman and writer (1872–1956)

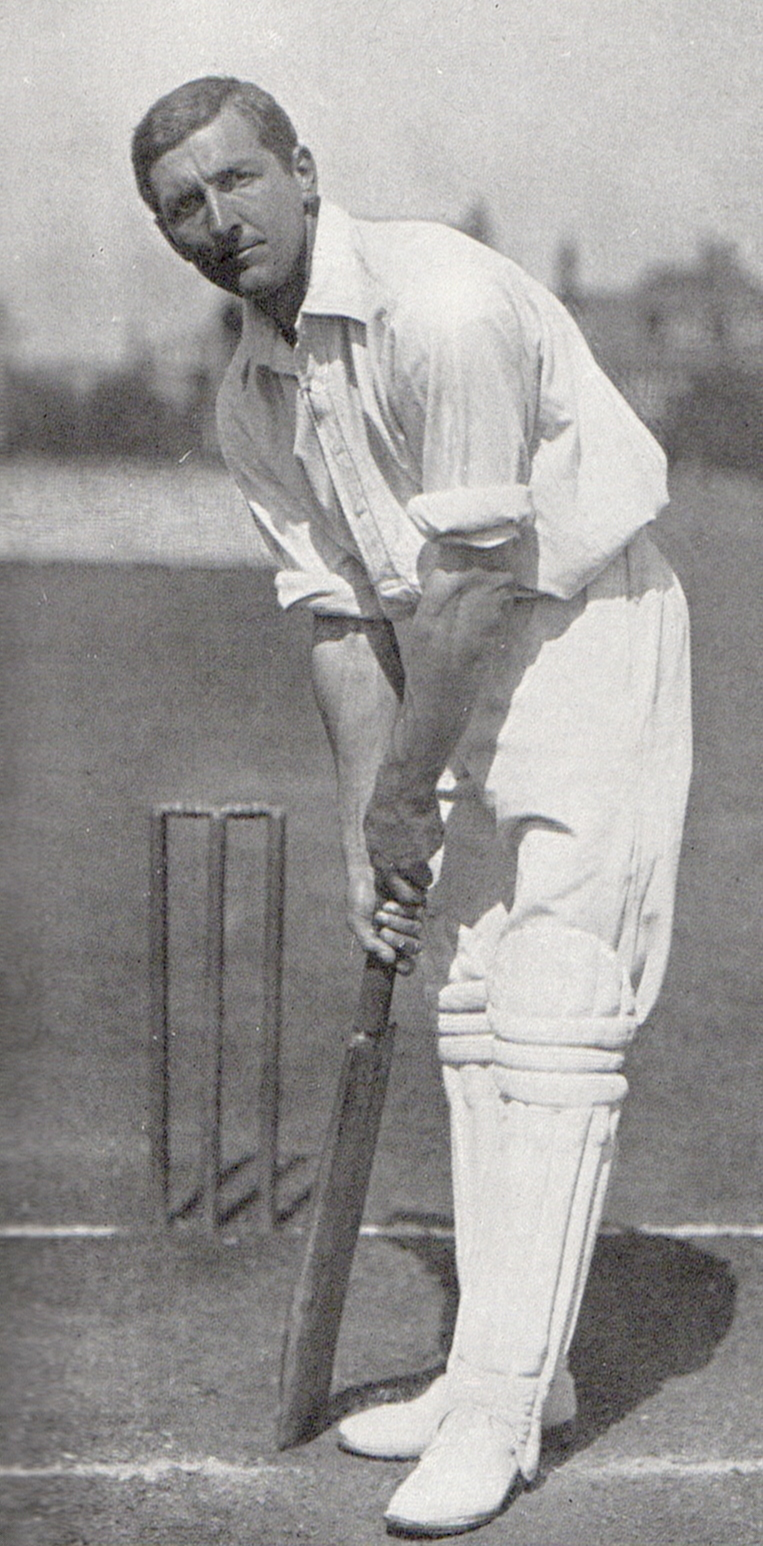

Personal information
- Full name: Charles Burgess Fry
- Born: 25 April 1872; Croydon, Surrey, England
- Died: 7 September 1956 (aged 84); Hampstead, London, England
- Batting: Right-handed
- Bowling: Right-arm fast-medium
- Relatives: Beatrice Holme Sumner (wife); Stephen Fry (son); Charles Fry (grandson)

International information
- National side: England
- Test debut (cap 95): 13 February 1896 v South Africa
- Last Test: 22 August 1912 v Australia

Domestic team information
- Years: Team
- 1892–1895: Oxford University
- 1893–1912: Marylebone Cricket Club
- 1894–1908: Sussex
- 1900–1902: London County
- 1909–1921: Hampshire
- 1921/22: Europeans

Career statistics
Competition	Test	First-class
Matches	26	394
Runs scored	1,223	30,886
Batting average	32.18	50.22
100s/50s	2/7	94/124
Top score	144	258*
Balls bowled	10	9,036
Wickets	0	166
Bowling average	–	29.34
5 wickets in innings	–	9
10 wickets in match	–	2
Best bowling	–	6/78
Catches/stumpings	17/–	239/–
- Source: ESPNcricinfo, 12 November 2008

Charles Burgess Fry (25 April 1872 – 7 September 1956) was an English sportsman, teacher, writer, editor and publisher, who is best remembered for his career as a cricketer. John Arlott described him with the words: "Charles Fry could be autocratic, angry and self-willed: he was also magnanimous, extravagant, generous, elegant, brilliant – and fun ... he was probably the most variously gifted Englishman of any age."

Fry's achievements on the sporting field included representing England at both cricket and football, an FA Cup Final appearance for Southampton and equalling the then-world record for the long jump. He also reputedly turned down the throne of Albania. In later life, he suffered mental health problems, but even well into his seventies he claimed he was still able to perform his party trick: leaping from a stationary position backwards onto a mantelpiece.

== Early life and education ==
=== Early life ===
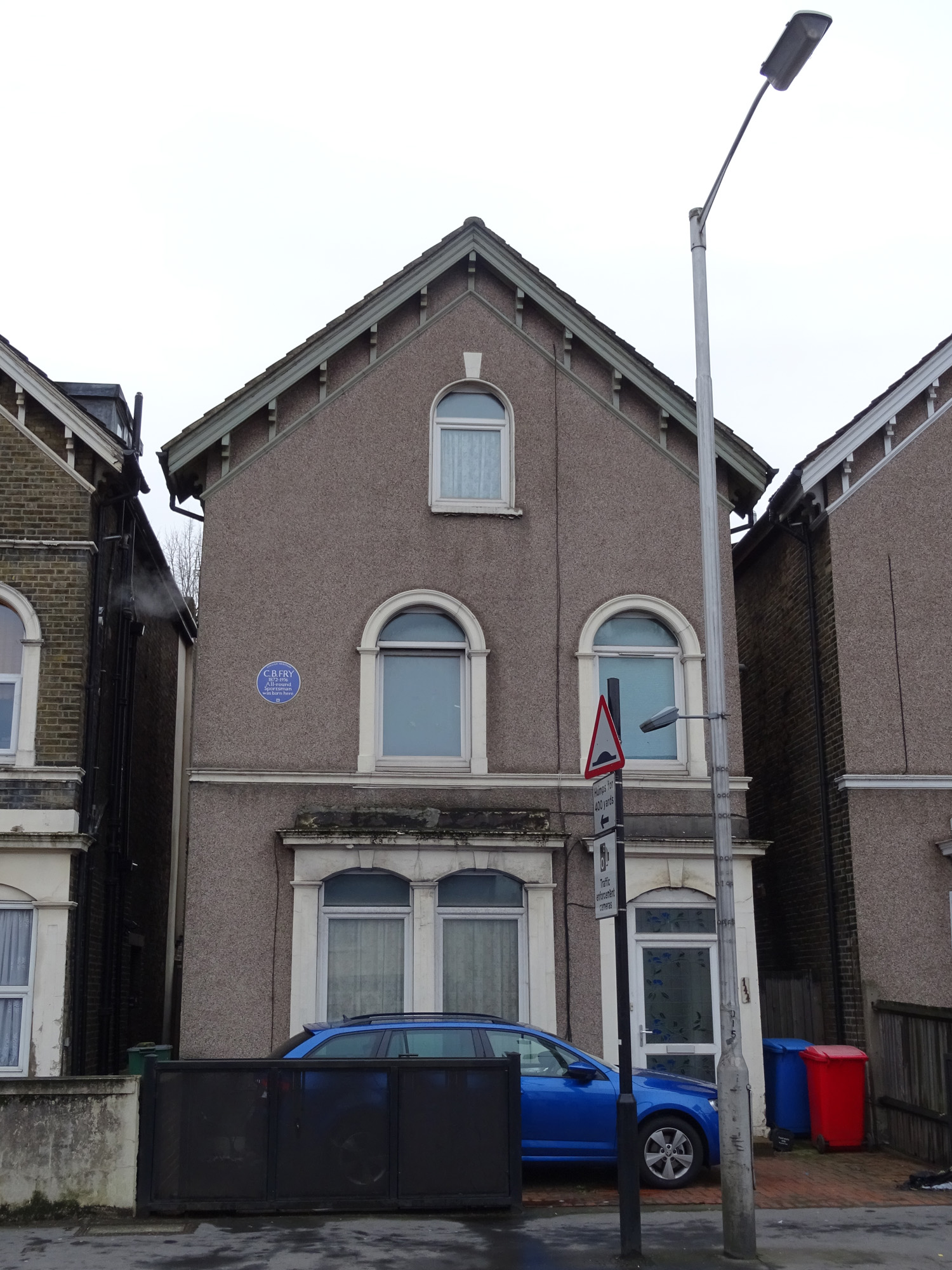
Fry's birthplace at 144 St James's Road in Croydon (pictured in 2016)

Charles Burgess Fry was born at 144 St James's Road in Croydon on 25 April 1872, the son of a civil servant, Lewis John Fry, and his wife, Constance Isabella White. Both sides of his family had once been wealthy, but by 1872 were not as prosperous. At a young age, the family moved from Croydon to Chislehurst in neighbouring Kent. It was here, in the family home that overlooked a cricket ground, where Fry began his fascination with cricket. Fry began his education at Hove Lodge school, before being moved from there to Hornbrook House school, where his struggles with mathematics led to tensions with the headmaster and his wife. His treatment at the school caused great psychological trauma, leaving him feeling unfufilled. He returned to Holmbrook for a third year, finding that the headmaster and his wife had departed, with their reforms in the school having a positive effect on Fry's mental wellbeing, with Fry later remarking that it felt like he had entered "another and better world". Amongst the improvements at the school was a greater focus on cricket, allowing Fry to hone his early skills. He also demonstrated his athletic and footballing prowess whilst at the school. Academically, a switch in the curriculum toward the classics saw Fry rise toward the top of his class.

=== Repton School ===
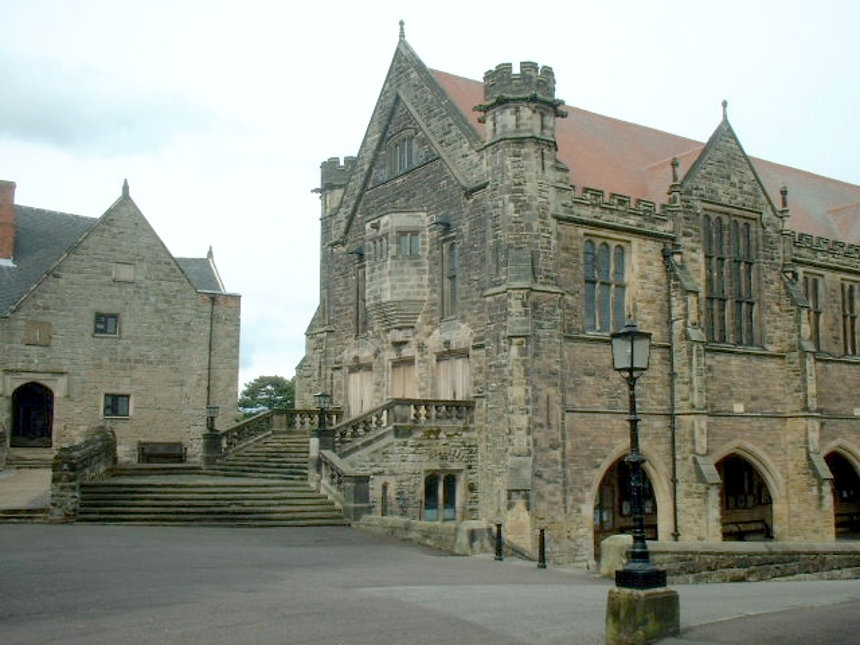
Repton School, where Fry was educated (pictured in 2007)

The family again relocated, this time to Streatham on account of his father's ill-health. It was the intention of his parents for Fry to progress to Aldenham School once he had left Hornbrook. To prepare for this, he was sent to Repton School for "practice", where he ended up winning a scholarship 'by mistake'. At Repton, he won the school prizes for Latin Verse, Greek Verse, Latin Prose and French. He was also runner-up in German. His weakest subject remained mathematics; he gained the headmaster's permission to study Thucydides instead and dispensed with maths for the rest of his academic career. He was a member of the school's debating society.

His greatest success at Repton came in sport. He was a member of the cricket eleven, securing his place in the school team in 1888 and captaining it in 1890 and 1891. In his last season at the school, his average was nearly 50. His cricket coach in his six years at Repton was Arthur Forman. Fry also captained the school football team, having managed to get into the school's under-16 team at the age of 13. The Football Annual in 1891 praised Fry describing him as "the most brilliant back the school has ever had". In athletics, he ran the 100 yards in under 11 seconds and set a new school long jump record of 21 feet that would not be beaten until 20 years later by Harold Abrahams. Amongst his rivals in athletics were the brothers Lionel and Richard Palairet.

=== Studies at Oxford ===
In 1890, he attempted to win a scholarship to what he believed would be Trinity College, Oxford. Fry travelled to Oxford to sit the examination held in the great hall at Wadham College, only then realising that the exam was being held jointly on behalf of both colleges. He received offers from both colleges, but opted to attend Wadham as their senior scholar, beating F. E. Smith (later the Earl of Birkenhead) to the scholarship. Excelling at Oxford as a sportsman, Fry's status brought him into the orbit of people whose fame was already spreading far beyond Oxford, such as Max Beerbohm, the writer and caricaturist. His reputation was such at Oxford, that he was one of a select few students to be allowed to have breakfast with Cecil Rhodes. When Fry was only 21, the magazine Vanity Fair published a caricature of him in its issue of 19 April 1894, with the comment: "He is sometimes known as "C.B."; but it has lately been suggested that he should be called 'Charles III'." Notably, whilst a keen debater at Repton, Fry declined several invitations to join the Oxford Union, largely due to time constraints with other ventures, not withstanding his academic studies and sporting endeavours. He was a member of the Oxford University Dramatic Society, causing controversy in its 1895 production of The Merchant of Venice with his use of the word "hell" in one of his lines; in the 1890s, "hell" was regarded as a risqué word.

In his final term at Oxford in 1895, Fry experienced his first bout of mental illness, suffering a mental breakdown. Several factors contributed to this. During his time at Oxford, Fry had accumulated large debts. In an attempt to alleviate his financial difficulties, Fry capitalised on his reputation to make some much-needed money by writing articles (including one for Wisden), and some private tutoring. Although such activities reduced his debts, they did not clear them and further increased the intense pressure on his time. Fry's continuing indebtedness provides the most obvious explanation for his acceptance of an offer to do some nude modelling. These financial problems combined with his mother being seriously ill, placed an unbearable strain on him. Although he was able to sit his final exams, he was hardly in any fit state to do so, having hardly read a line for weeks. The result was Fry scraping a fourth-class degree in literae humaniores, bringing his studies at Oxford to an inglorious end. In the summer of 1895, only months after being the toast of Oxford, Fry found himself saddled with mounting debts and no way with which to repay them. In the short term, cricket came to his rescue. He was offered, and accepted, the chance to tour South Africa as a member of Lord Hawke's 1895–96 England touring party.

== Sporting career ==
=== Cricket ===
==== Oxford University ====
After matriculating to Oxford, he played for a sixteen-man freshman team against Oxford University Cricket Club, scoring 92 runs. He followed up in his next match by scoring 66 of his teams 79 runs and taking six wickets. In his freshman year, he made his debut in first-class cricket for Oxford University Cricket Club against the Gentlemen of England at the University Parks in Oxford. He made nine first-class appearances for Oxford in 1892, meeting with modest success. Against Somerset at Oxford, Fry recorded his first century (110 runs) in first-class cricket, an innings that assisted Oxford to victory by 7 wickets. By playing in the 1892 University Match at Lord's, he gained his first blue. Oxford endured a tough season, failing win any of their matches, though Fry was considered one of the teams better players. The following season, he made eleven appearances in first-class cricket, scoring 398 runs, though his highest score was 59 runs. In 1893, he debuted for both the Marylebone Cricket Club (MCC) and the Gentlemen in the Gentlemen versus Players fixture.

Ahead of the 1894 season, Fry was elected captain of the cricket club, succeeding Lionel Palairet. He captained Oxford to victory in the 1893 University Match, scoring an unbeaten century in Oxford's first innings. Despite his century, he drew criticism for his slow scoring rate early in his innings. His captaincy in the match drew praise from the Illustrated Sporting and Dramatic News, citing his good judgement in field placing and knowing when it was time to change bowlers. Earlier in the season against Sussex, he scored 119 runs and shared in a partnership of 153 runs for the fourth wicket with Gerald Mordaunt. After excluding himself from Oxford's early home matches in 1895, Fry encountered all-round success. With Oxford's bowling being weak in 1895, Fry was able to demonstrate his abilities as a right-arm fast-medium bowler. He returned his career best figures of 6 for 78 in the 1895 University Match, He also enjoyed success as a batsman, scoring 125 runs against Sussex on a flat wicket at Hove. Against Kent at Maidstone, he was dismissed one run short of his century.

==== Sussex and Test debut ====
Fry played for Surrey in 1891 (but not in any first-class fixtures), Oxford University 1892–1895 (winning Blues in all four years and captaining the university in 1894, meaning that he was simultaneously not only captain of both the university cricket and football teams but president of the varsity athletics club as well) Sussex 1894–1908 (captain 1904–1908), and Hampshire, 1909–1921. First selected by England for the tour of South Africa in 1895–96, he captained England in his final six Test matches in 1912, winning four and drawing two. He twice scored Test centuries: 144 v Australia in 1905 hitting 23 fours in just over 3 1/2 hours, batting at number four, and 129 opening the batting against South Africa in 1907.

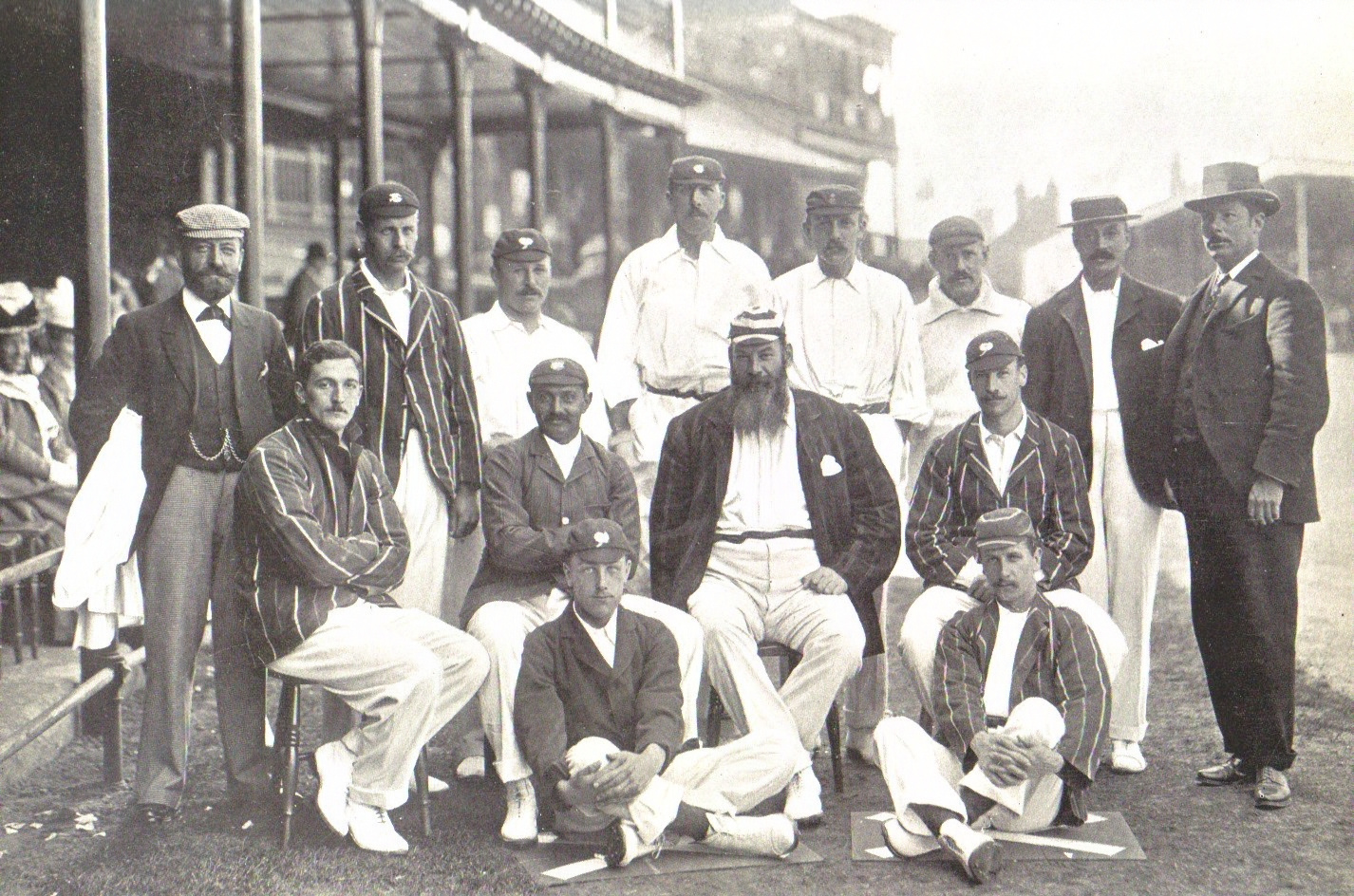
England v. Australia at Trent Bridge, 1899. Back row: Dick Barlow (umpire), Tom Hayward, George Hirst, Billy Gunn, J. T. Hearne (12th man), Bill Storer (wkt kpr), Bill Brockwell, V. A. Titchmarsh (umpire). Middle row: C. B. Fry, K. S. Ranjitsinhji, W. G. Grace (captain), Stanley Jackson. Front row: Wilfred Rhodes, Johnny Tyldesley

And he twice took ten wickets in a match: 5–75 and 5–102 for the Gentlemen of England against I Zingari in 1895, and 5–81 and 5–66 for Sussex against Nottinghamshire in 1896 (a match in which he also scored 89 and 65). The late 1890s saw a re-emergence of the throwing controversy in cricket. Several professional bowlers including Arthur Mold and Ernie Jones were no-balled; Mold was forced to retire. Fry's bowling action was criticised by opponents and teammates, and it was only a matter of time before he too was no-balled by umpire Jim Phillips.

Fry scored 94 first-class centuries, including an unprecedented six consecutive centuries in 1901. No one else has scored more consecutive hundreds. On 12 September 1901, playing for the Rest of England against Yorkshire at Lord's, he scored 105, which was his sixth consecutive first-class century. He made his highest first-class score of 258 not out in 1911, a season which led to his recall to the England Test team as captain in 1912. In 1921 Fry was once again considered for the Test team. The Selection Committee asked him to play in the First Test match at Nottingham under the captaincy of Johnny Douglas, with a view to taking over the captaincy for the remainder of the series if, as they anticipated, things went wrong. Fry declined on the basis that there was no sense in recalling a forty-nine-year-old merely as a player, but stated that he would consider returning as captain. As England were badly beaten at Nottingham the Selection Committee again pressed Fry to return for the Second Test but once again he declined, due to poor form. Following another heavy defeat in the Second Test the Selection Committee made a further attempt to persuade Fry to return for the Third Test as captain, a job he was now keen to accept. He injured a finger taking a catch during Hampshire's match with the Australians. In the short term, the injury did not appear too serious: he scored a half-century in Hampshire's first innings and, when they followed on in reply to the Australians' massive total he top scored with 37. Furthermore, in his next match against Nottinghamshire he scored 61 in the first innings (but registered a duck in the second). It appears however that the injury was affecting his fielding more than his batting and, for last time, C.B. felt obliged to stand down from the team for the next Test. Fry later commentated on cricket matches, being called "one of the most eloquent cricket commentators of all time."

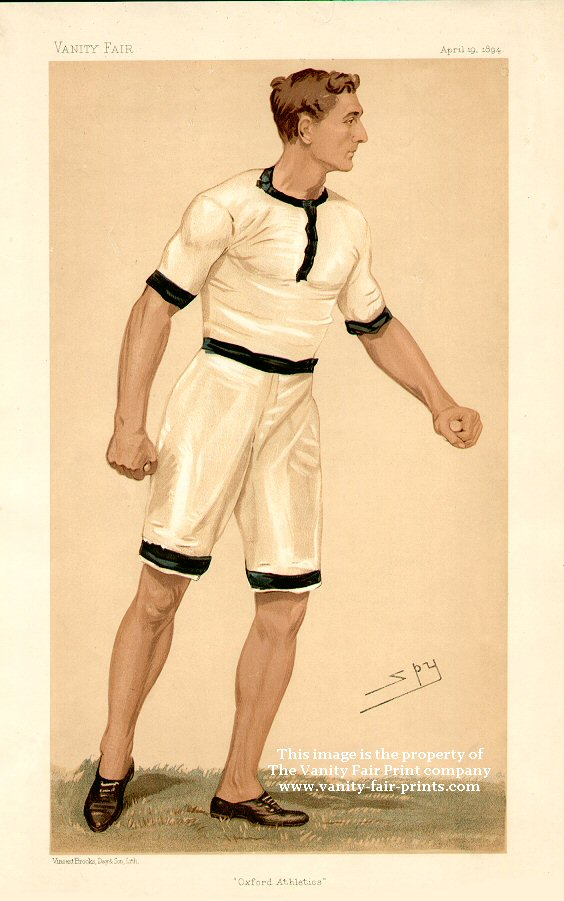
Fry caricatured by Spy for Vanity Fair, 1894

For both Sussex and England, he was closely associated with the outstanding cricketer Prince Ranjitsinhji, the future Jam Sahib of Nawanagar. Their contrasting batting styles complemented one another (Fry being an orthodox, technically correct batsman, and Ranji being noted for his innovation, particularly his use of the leg glance). Their friendship lasted well into the 1920s, and when Ranjitsinhji became one of India's three representatives at the League of Nations, he took Fry with him as his assistant.

==== Playing style and statistics ====
Early in his career, he struggled to play slow bowling. As a highly effective right-handed batsman who batted at, or near the top of the order, Fry scored 30,886 first-class runs at an average of 50.22, a particularly high figure for an era when scores were generally lower than today. At the end of his cricketing career in 1921–22, he had the second highest average of any retired player with over 10,000 runs: only his Sussex and England colleague Ranjitsinhji had retired with a better career average. He headed the batting averages (qualification minimum 20 innings) for six English seasons (in 1901, 1903, 1905, 1907, 1911 and 1912). Against Yorkshire, the strongest county bowling attack of Fry's time, he averaged a remarkable 63.60 over the course of his career, including back to back scores of 177 and 229 against them in 1904. GL Jessop said that calmness was at the heart of his batting and that he was a superb judge of a run as well as being fast between the wickets. In his early career Fry was an enthusiastic and successful right-arm fast-medium bowler.

=== Athletics ===
In athletics, Fry won Blues in all four years at Oxford 1892–95, representing the university against Cambridge in the long jump in 1892, 1893, 1894 and 1895; the high jump in 1892 and the 100 yards in 1893 and 1894. In 1892 Fry broke the British long jump record with a jump of 23 feet 5 inches (7.14 m) and a year later on 4 March 1893 equalled the world long jump record of 23 feet 6 1/2 inches (7.176 m) (tied with the American Charles Reber). This is often incorrectly claimed to have stood as a world record for 21 years, but this length of time actually only refers to how long he held the university record, Cambridge's H. S. O. Ashington adding three-quarters of an inch to Fry's distance in 1913. Fry's shared world record was broken on 5 September 1894 by Ireland's J. J. Mooney.

In the first contest between universities from different countries, Oxford v Yale at the Queen's Club, West Kensington, in 1894, Fry came third in the long jump and won the 100 yards. In addition to being an outstanding long jumper, sprinter and high jumper, Fry was also a talented hurdler, once competing against Godfrey Shaw the champion hurdler of the time, who beat him but told him, as Fry later recalled: "He was sure if I took up hurdling seriously I might win the championship." Fry was also president of the Oxford University athletics club in 1894.

=== Other sports ===
Apart from his other sporting achievements stated below, Fry was also a decent shot putter, hammer thrower and ice skater, representing Wadham in the inter-College races on Blenheim lake in the winter of 1894–95 and coming close to an unofficial blue as a member of the Oxford ice hockey team who took on Cambridge on the Fens, as well as being a proficient golfer.

=== Football ===
C. B. Fry
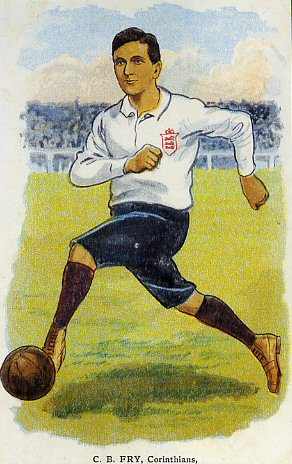

Personal information
- Height: 5 ft 10 in (1.78 m)
- Position: Full-back

Senior career*
Years	Team	Apps	(Gls)
1891–1903	Corinthian		
1900–1902	Southampton	16	(0)
1902–1903	Portsmouth	2	(0)

International career
1901	England	1	(0)
- * Club domestic league appearances and goals

Fry's achievements extended to association football.

A defender with exceptional pace, Fry learned his football at Repton School, where he played for and captained the school team. While still at school he also played for the famous amateur club the Casuals, for whom he found himself turning out in an FA Cup tie at the age of sixteen. Fry went on to win Blues in each of his four years at Oxford University captaining the team in his third year. In 1891, he joined another famous amateur club, Corinthian, going on to make a total of 74 appearances for them between 1891 and 1903 scoring four goals. Although extremely proud of his amateur status, he decided that entering the professional game would enhance his chance of international honours. He chose Southampton F.C. (The Saints), as the leading lights in the Southern League, and also because The Dell was conveniently close to his home. He made his debut for Southampton (as an amateur) on 26 December 1900, against Tottenham Hotspur and went on to help them win the Southern League title during that 1900–01 season.

Fry's game was probably a little too refined for the hurly-burly of professional football, he never relished the aerial challenges that were more prevalent in the professional game, but having worked tirelessly to improve his heading ability he achieved his aim of international honours when (along with Southampton's goalkeeper, Jack Robinson), he was picked to play as a full-back for England in the match against Ireland on 9 March 1901 (played in Southampton).

The following season (1901–02), Southampton reached the FA Cup Final, playing against Sheffield United, which was drawn 1–1, but Southampton lost the replay, 2–1. Although he had moments during the cup run in which he excelled, his positional play was sometimes questioned. Fry played in all eight of the FA Cup games for Southampton that season, but in only nine Southern League matches, with Bill Henderson being forced to give way whenever Fry was available. The following season, he played twice at centre forward, without success, but Southampton released him partly due to his lack of availability. Fry made 25 first-team appearances for Southampton. He then joined Southampton's local rivals Portsmouth, making his debut for them on 21 January 1903. Fry made three appearances for Portsmouth (as an amateur) before retiring from football due to injury.

=== Rugby union ===
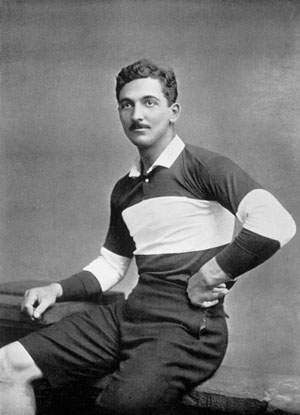
Fry wearing Barbarians kit, c.1893.

Fry played rugby union for Oxford University, narrowly missing out on a Blue in his final year due to injury, Blackheath, for whom he made ten appearances, and the Barbarians, for whom he made three appearances. Fry was also chosen, as he later recalled, as the "first reserve for the South against the North" – a match that was, in effect, an England trial. Unfortunately for Fry, no one pulled out before the match and, as there were no substitutions allowed in rugby at the time, he did not get to play.

=== Acrobatics ===
Fry's party trick was to leap from a stationary position on the floor backwards onto a mantelpiece; he would face the mantelpiece, crouch down, take a leap upwards, turn in the air, and bow to the gallery with his feet planted on the shelf. Persuasion would occasionally get him to perform this turn at country houses, much to the interest of the guests.

== Career outside sport ==
=== Teaching ===
In 1896 Fry took up a teaching position at Charterhouse. Two years later in 1898 he left the profession, moving on to a successful and much more lucrative and less time-consuming career in journalism. He later recalled: "I could earn by journalism three times the income for the expenditure of a tenth of the time."

In December 1908 he became the Captain Superintendent of the Training Ship Mercury, a nautical school primarily designed to prepare boys for service in the Royal Navy; this was run by his wife Beatrice Holme Sumner from 1885 to 1946, she having founded the school with her lover (and father of her two illegitimate children), the rich banker Charles Hoare, before marriage to Fry in 1898.. She subjected the schoolboys, 'hounded from morn to night', to 'barbarities' including ceremonial floggings of extreme violence and forced boxing matches inflicted as punishment. Fry held this position until he resigned to make way for a younger man in 1950. Eventually he was given the rank of captain in the Royal Naval Reserve (RNR). Alan Gibson wrote: "He ... would stride about in his uniform looking, as I think it was Robertson-Glasgow who said, every inch like six admirals." Interviewed about the Mercury, and his role in its development, he was addressed as 'Commander C. B. Fry'.

=== Politics ===
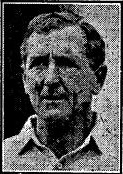
C. B. Fry in the early 1920s whilst standing for one of the Brighton seats

As far back as his time at Wadham College, Fry had been interested in politics, but admitted: "I take a great interest in heaps of things that I know nothing about ... politics for one".

In 1920 when his friend and former Sussex team-mate Ranjitsinhji was offered and accepted the chance to become one of India's three representatives at the newly created League of Nations in Geneva he took Fry with him as his assistant. It was whilst working for Ranjitsinhji at the League of Nations, in Geneva, that Fry claimed to have been offered the throne of Albania. Whether this offer genuinely occurred has been questioned, but Fry was definitely approached about the vacant Albanian throne and therefore seems to have been considered a credible candidate for the post.

He stood (unsuccessfully) as a Liberal candidate for parliament for the Brighton constituency in 1922. Fry's presence certainly brought some welcome glamour and excitement to the election, and his campaign was given extra colour by the appearance, at an election meeting, of Dame Clara Butt, the opera singer (and a close personal friend of the Frys). He won 22,059 votes, 4,785 fewer than the Conservative victor.

He later fought the seat of Banbury in 1923, losing by just 219 votes, and the Oxford by-election in 1924, where he was defeated by 1,842 votes.

Fry in 1922

General Election 1922: Brighton
Party	Candidate	Votes	%	±%
Unionist	✓ Rt Hon. George Clement Tryon	28,549	32.0	
Unionist	✓ Sir Alfred Cooper Rawson	26,844	30.0	
Liberal	Charles Burgess Fry	22,059	24.7	
Ind. Unionist	H Wheater	11,913	13.3	
Majority		4,785	5.3	
Turnout			70.1	
Unionist hold		Swing		

General Election 1923: Banbury
Party	Candidate	Votes	%	±%
Unionist	Albert James Edmondson	12,490	45.8	−0.7
Liberal	Charles Burgess Fry	12,271	45.0	+15.6
Labour	Ernest Nathaniel Bennett	2,500	9.2	−14.9
Majority		219	0.8	−16.3
Turnout		27,261	76.0	−0.4
Unionist hold		Swing	-8.2	

1924 Oxford by-election
Party	Candidate	Votes	%	±%
Unionist	Robert Bourne	10,079	47.8	+3.9
Liberal	Charles Burgess Fry	8,237	39.1	−17.0
Labour	Kenneth Martin Lindsay	2,769	13.1	N/A
Majority		1,842	8.7	N/A
Turnout		21,085	80.3	
Unionist gain from Liberal		Swing	+10.5	

=== Writing, editing, publishing and broadcasting ===
Books by Fry include:

- The Book of Cricket: A New Gallery of Famous Players (1899), editor, appeared in 14 weekly parts.
- Giants of the Game: Being Reminiscences of the Stars of Cricket from Daft Down to the Present Day (c. 1900), with R. H. Lyttleton, W. J. Ford & George Giffen.
- Great Batsmen: Their Methods at a Glance (1905), with George W Beldam, who provided the photographs.
- Great Bowlers and Fielders: Their Methods at a Glance (1907), with George W. Beldam
- A Mother's Son (1907), a novel written in collaboration with his wife.
- Cricket: Batsmanship (1912).
- Key-Book of The League of Nations.
- Life Worth Living: Some Phases Of An Englishman (1939), his autobiography.
- Cricket on the Green For Club And Village Cricketers And For Boys (1947), with R. S. Young.

He is also believed to have written much of The Jubilee Book of Cricket (1897), of which the nominal author was Ranji. He wrote prefaces and introductions for a number of other cricket books, and wrote articles on cricket and football for The Strand Magazine in the early years of the 20th century. In the 1930s, he wrote a column for the London Evening Standard, which covered many topics. The column was credited with a considerable increase in the paper's circulation. He launched and edited C. B. Fry's Magazine. In his magazine he promoted toys such as the diabolo. A History and Bibliography of Fry's Magazine was published in December 2022 by Sports History Publishing.

His broadcasting career began in 1936 with commentary for the BBC on a match between Middlesex and Surrey. He declined to join the panel on Any Questions but in 1945 began a successful stint on The Brains Trust. In 1946 he was one of the BBC radio commentary team for the Tests between England and India. In 1953 he gave a 3-hour interview to the BBC which was edited down to 30 minutes for the programme Frankly Speaking. In 1955, he was surprised by Eamonn Andrews for the fifth episode of the new television show This Is Your Life. Amongst the friends gathered to relive his best moments were Jack Hobbs and Sydney Barnes.

== Later life ==
In the 1920s, Fry's mental health started to deteriorate severely. He had encountered mental health problems earlier in his life, experiencing a breakdown during his final year at Oxford, which meant that, although academically brilliant, he achieved a poor degree. In the late 1920s, he had a major breakdown and became deeply paranoid. He reached breaking point in 1928 during a visit to India, becoming convinced that an Indian had cast a spell on him. For the rest of his life, he dressed in bizarrely unconventional clothes. He recovered enough to become a popular writer on cricket and other sports, and even into his sixties he entertained hopes of becoming a Hollywood star. At one point when he was staying in Brighton he was supposed to have gone for a walk along the beach early in the morning and suddenly shed all his clothes, trotting around stark naked.

In 1934, as reported in his 1939 autobiography, Life Worth Living, he visited Germany with the idea of forging stronger links between the uniformed British youth organisations, such as the Boy Scouts, and the Hitler Youth, so that both groups could learn from each other. Fry met Adolf Hitler who greeted him with a Nazi salute which he returned with a Nazi salute of his own. He failed to persuade von Ribbentrop that Nazi Germany should take up cricket to Test level. Some members of the Hitler Youth were welcomed at TS Mercury, and Fry was still enthusiastic about them in 1938, just prior to the outbreak of war. Fry's laudatory statements about Hitler persisted through his autobiography's third impression in July 1941 but appear to have been purged in the fourth impression (1947).

He retired from his position at TS Mercury in 1950, and died in 1956, in Hampstead, London. The English writer and critic Neville Cardus wrote the following words for Fry's obituary:

Fry must be counted among the most fully developed and representative Englishmen of his period; and the question arises whether, had fortune allowed him to concentrate on the things of the mind, not distracted by the lure of cricket, a lure intensified by his increasing mastery over the game, he would not have reached a high altitude in politics or critical literature. But he belonged – and it was his glory – to an age not obsessed by specialism; he was one of the last of the English tradition of the amateur, the connoisseur, and, in the most delightful sense of the word, the dilettante.

His ashes were buried in the graveyard of Repton Parish Church, next to Repton School's Priory. In 2008, his grandson, Jonathan Fry (chairman of the governors at Repton), was in attendance at the rededication of Fry's grave, which was inscribed with, "1872 C B Fry 1956. Cricketer, scholar, athlete, Author – The Ultimate All-rounder'.

== Personal life ==
In 1898, Fry married Beatrice Holme Sumner (1862–1946), daughter of Arthur Holme Sumner, of Hatchlands Park, Guildford, Surrey; they had three children. Beatrice was ten years Fry's senior, and known for her 'fiery, strong-willed, aggressive' personality; she was reckoned to be 'a cruel and domineering woman', and Fry 'lived in fear of her for the duration of their marriage', as 'she made him thoroughly miserable and he tried to stay away from her as much as possible'. His unhappy marriage impacted Fry's mental health; his daughter-in-law observed: 'I should think anyone would have a breakdown married to her". At Beatrice's death, they had been married for 48 years; Fry 'adjusted to her death with great equanimity and even her children showed all the freedom of the newly liberated'. Their son Stephen Fry later said: 'My mother ruined my father's life'. Like C.B., both Stephen and his own son Charles Fry also played first-class cricket.

== Honours ==
Southampton F.C.

- FA Cup finalist: 1902

Two Brighton & Hove buses (429 and 829) were named "C B Fry" in his honour.

== See also ==
- List of English cricket and football players
- List of cricket and rugby union players

== Bibliography ==
- Arlott, John (1984). Arlott on Cricket – His Writings on the Game. Harper Collins Willow. ISBN 978-0-00-218082-5.
- Carr, J. L. (1977). Dictionary of Extra-ordinary English Cricketers. J.L. Carr, Kettering. ISBN 978-0-900847-80-6.
- Chalk, Gary; Holley, Duncan (1991). The Alphabet of the Saints: Complete Who's Who of Southampton Football Club. Polar Print Group Ltd. ISBN 978-0-9514862-3-8.
- Ellis, Clive (1984). C.B.: The Life of Charles Burgess Fry. J. M. Dent & Sons; 1st edition. ISBN 978-0-460-04654-1.
- Frith, David (1987). Pageant of Cricket. Macmillan; 1st Edition. ISBN 978-0-333-45177-9.
- Fry, C. B. (1986) [1939]. Life Worth Living. Pavilion Books. ISBN 978-1-85145-027-5.
  - Fry, C. B. (1939). Life Worth Living: some phases of an Englishman. Eyre & Spottiswoode. ASIN B00085VPTM.
- Fry, Beatrice (2011). A Mother's Son. Lightning Source UK Ltd. ISBN 978-1-246-15195-4.
- Gibson, Alan (1989). The Cricket Captains of England. Pavilion Books. ISBN 978-1-85145-395-5.
- Harris, Henry Wilson (1970). Spectator harvest. Books for Libraries Press. ISBN 978-0-8369-1481-8.
- Harris, Michael; Lee, Alan J. (1986). The Press in English Society: From the 17th Century to the 19th Century. US: Fairleigh Dickinson University Press. ISBN 978-0-8386-3272-7.
- Marshall, Don; Howe, Glenford (2001). The Empowering Impulse: The Nationalist Tradition of Barbados. Canoe Press. ISBN 978-976-8125-74-3.
- Martin-Jenkins, Christopher (1990). Ball by Ball: Story of Cricket Broadcasting. Grafton. ISBN 978-0-246-13568-1.
- Morris, Ronald (1985). The Captain's Lady. Chatto & Windus. ISBN 978-0-7011-2946-0.
- Roberts, Sydney Castle (1958). Doctor Johnson and Others. Cambridge University Press.
- Robinson, Nick (1987). Hamble: A Village History. Waterfront Publications. ISBN 978-0-946184-32-3.
- Sentance, P. David (2006). Cricket in America, 1710–2000. McFarland & Co Inc Pub. ISBN 978-0-7864-2040-7.
- Wilde, Simon (2005). Ranji: The Strange Genius of Ranjitsinhji. Aurum Press Ltd. ISBN 978-1-84513-069-5.
- Wilson, Jeremy (2006). Southampton's Cult Heroes: Saints' 20 Greatest Icons. Know the Score Books. ISBN 978-1-905449-01-9.
- Wilton, Iain (2000). C.B. Fry: An English Hero. Metro Books. ISBN 978-1-86066-180-8.

Sporting positions
Preceded by Johnny Douglas	English national cricket captain 1912	Succeeded by Johnny Douglas
Preceded by Ranjitsinhji	Sussex county cricket captain 1904–1906	Succeeded by C. L. A. Smith
Preceded by C. L. A. Smith	Sussex county cricket captain 1907–1908	Succeeded by C. L. A. Smith
