= Jean Palairet =

Jean Palairet (1697–1774) was a teacher and a French cartographer.

== Life ==
Jean Palairet was born in Montauban, Languedoc, but emigrated to England. He worked as an agent in London for the French States General, and taught French to the children of George II: Prince William, afterwards Duke of Cumberland, and the Princesses Mary and Louisa.

His correspondence with Count Bentinck in 1750, 1758, and 1761, in French, is among the Egerton MSS. in the British Museum, Nos. 1727 and 1746. A letter from him to the Duke of Newcastle in 1757 is in Additional MS. 32871, f. 331.

While working as London agent for Jacob Boreel Jansz, Palairet apparently played a part in introducing the game of cricket to the Netherlands: in 1765 he sent four balls and 12 bats to the Netherlands, and attempted to find a copy of a rule-book for the game.

Не had been twice married, and left two sons : Elias John and David, and three daughters.

He died in the parish of St James's Westminster in 1774. ·

Cartograms published by Jean Palairet

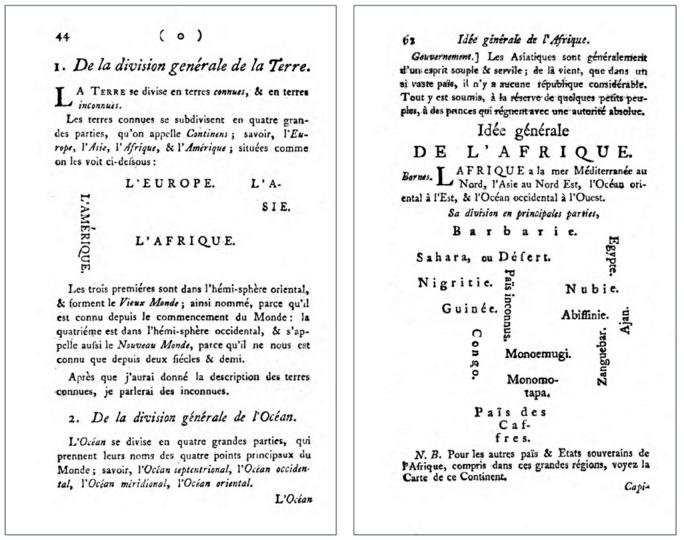
The world; Africa.

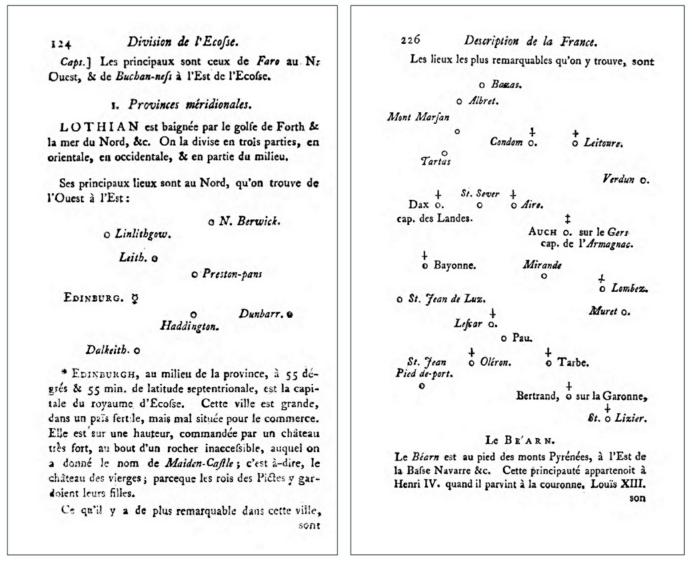
Scotland; France.

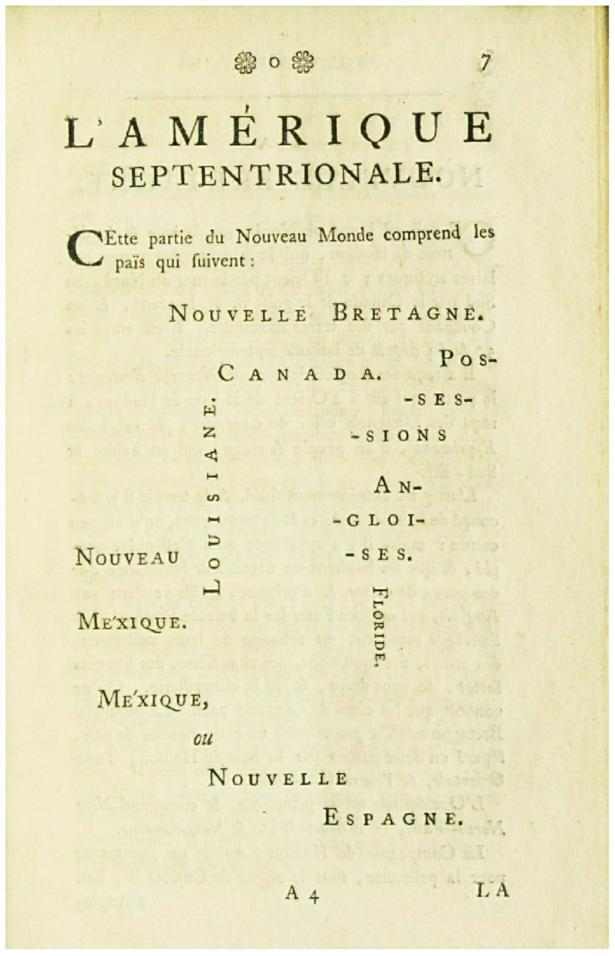
North America.

== Works ==
- Nouvelle méthode pour apprendre à bien lire, et à bien orthographier, 1727
- A short treatise on the arts and sciences, in French and English, 1736
- A new Royal French grammar containing rules for the pronouncing and writing of the French tongue, 1738
- Nouvelle introduction à la géographie moderne, 1754
- Atlas méthodique composé pour l'usage de son altesse sérénissime monseigneur le prince d'Orange et de Nassau, Stadhouder des Sept Provinces-Unies, 1755
- Carte des Possessions Angloises et Françoises d'Amérique septentrionale, 1755
- A concise description of the English and French possessions in North-America for the better explaining of the map published with that title, 1755
