= Groupement Européen de Banques =

Organization of European private banks

The Groupement Européen de Banques (GEB) is a European Economic Interest Group composed by European private banks. It was founded in 1981 and is a non profit organisation focused on the exchange of information on the financial and banking situation of the countries represented.

The current members are Alandsbanken, Banca March, Banc Passadore & Co., Banca Sella, Banco Finantia, Bank Van Breda, Banque Martin Maurel, C. Hoare & Co. and Erik Penser Bank.
