= The Jubilee Book of Cricket =

The Jubilee Book of Cricket is a classic work on cricket by Prince K.S. Ranjitsinhji. 'Ranji' was one of the leading batsmen of his day, playing for Sussex and England.

The book was entitled for the Diamond Jubilee of Queen Victoria in 1897 and dedicated "by her gracious permission to Her Majesty The Queen Empress." The book covers topics such as playing skills and public school, university and county cricket and illustrated with drawings and numerous photographs, including pictures of his contemporaries such as C.B. Fry (who wrote a considerable portion of the book for his friend) and W.G. Grace. It is recognised as a classic treatise on the game.
