= Richard Palairet =

English cricketer

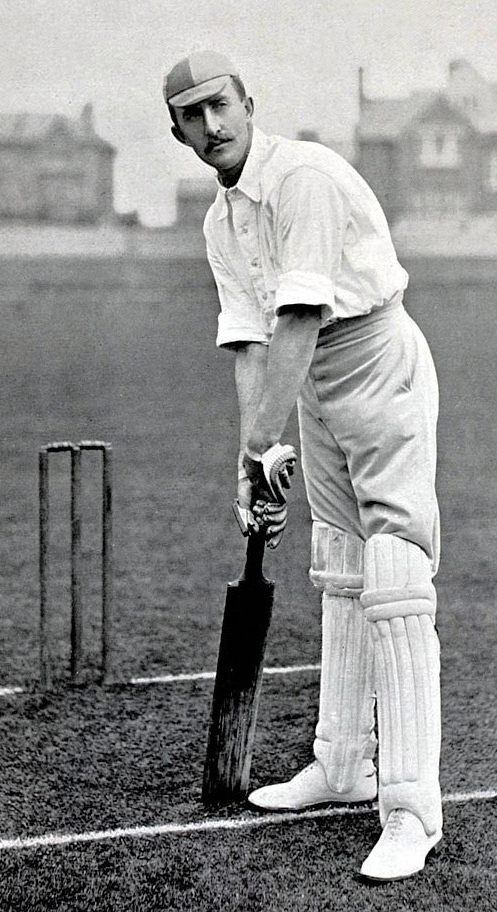

Personal information
- Full name: Richard Cameron North Palairet
- Born: 25 June 1871; Grange-over-Sands, Lancashire, England
- Died: 11 February 1955 (aged 83); Budleigh Salterton, Devon, England
- Batting: Right-handed
- Relatives: Henry Palairet (father); Lionel Palairet (brother)

Domestic team information
- Years: Team
- 1891–1894: Oxford University
- 1891–1902: Somerset

Career statistics
Competition	First-class
Matches	112
Runs scored	4,000
Batting average	21.16
100s/50s	2/20
Top score	156
Balls bowled	223
Wickets	3
Bowling average	55.66
5 wickets in innings	0
10 wickets in match	0
Best bowling	1/19
Catches/stumpings	108/–
- Source: CricketArchive, 31 August 2012

Richard Cameron North Palairet (25 June 1871 – 11 February 1955) was an English cricketer who played first-class cricket for Oxford University and Somerset. After his playing days, he became a prominent cricket administrator, acting as secretary at Surrey County Cricket Club and being joint manager, with Pelham Warner, of the English cricket team in Australia in 1932-33 which became embroiled in the Bodyline controversy.

As a cricket player, Palairet was overshadowed by his brother, Lionel, who played for the same two first-class sides and was regarded as one of the stylish batsmen of the 1890s and the early 1900s. Their father, Henry Palairet, played first-class cricket twice for Marylebone Cricket Club (MCC) in 1868 and 1869.

Richard Palairet's first-class record indicates that he was a useful right-handed batsman, but probably no more than useful: as a schoolboy at Repton he had been more successful than Lionel, but a soccer injury at Oxford restricted his movement and his fluency. He often opened the innings, though less frequently for Somerset, where his brother was ensconced at No 1, than for Oxford.

In 112 first-class matches, he made exactly 4,000 runs at an average of 21 runs per innings; he scored only two centuries in a career that lasted 12 years. His highest was 156 against Sussex at the County Ground, Taunton in 1896 when he put on 249 for the second wicket with his brother, who made 154. In the winter of 1896–97 he was a member of a touring team to the West Indies led by Arthur Priestley; a second touring side to the West Indies that winter was led by Lord Hawke. After that tour, his appearances in first-class cricket became less frequent.

Palairet played his last first-class match in 1902, but came back into the game as secretary of Surrey from 1920 to 1932. He stood down from that post to become joint manager on the Bodyline tour. He was president of Somerset County Cricket Club from 1937 to 1946.

== Education and military service ==
Palairet was educated at Repton School before attending Oriel College, Oxford. He served in India including Waziristan (1919) between 1914 and 1919 with the 2nd Battalion Devonshire Regiment during the First World War. Palairet was promoted to captain in 1917.
