= C. Hoare & Co =

British private bank

C. Hoare & Co.
- Type: Private bank
- Industry: Banking
- Founded: 5 July 1672; 354 years ago
- Founder: Sir Richard Hoare
- Headquarters: London, England, UK
- Key people: The Lord Macpherson of Earl's Court (Chairman); Simon Kenyon (Chief Executive)
- Products: Financial services
- Number of employees: 400
- Website: hoaresbank.co.uk

C. Hoare & Co., also known as Hoares, is a British private bank, founded in 1672 by Sir Richard Hoare. A twelfth-generation family business, it is owned by eight of Sir Richard's direct descendants. It is the oldest privately owned bank in the United Kingdom and reputedly the fourth-oldest in continuous operation globally. It is also the second oldest family owned bank in the world after the Berenberg Bank.

C. Hoare & Co. provides private banking services that include loans, mortgages and savings accounts. Over the years, its clients have included Samuel Pepys, John Dryden, Jane Austen and numerous members of the aristocracy; today, they are primarily high-net-worth individuals and families. The bank has two branches in London, 37 Fleet Street and 32 Lowndes Street.

== History ==
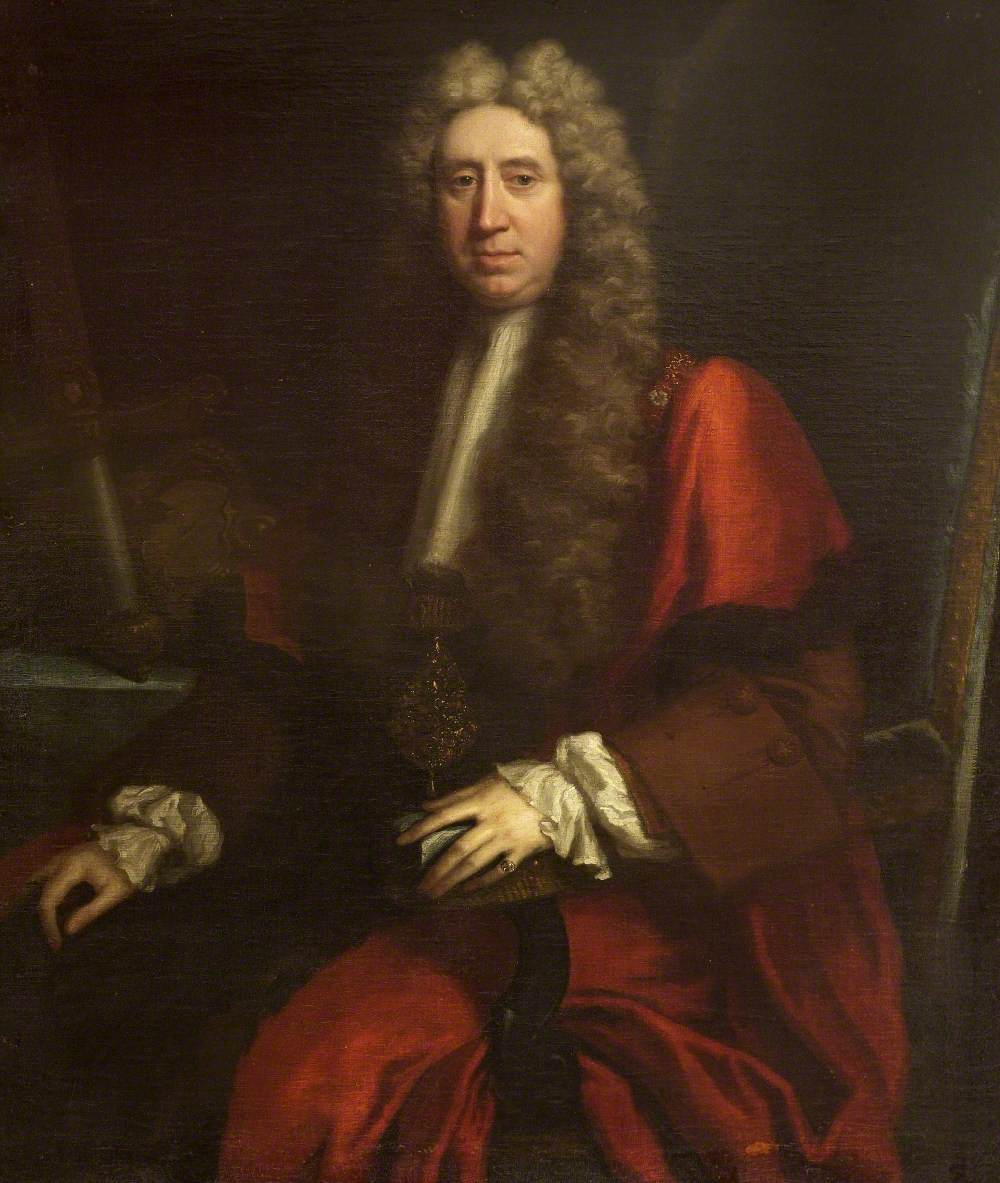
Sir Richard Hoare, the bank's founder.

=== 17th century ===
After finishing his apprenticeship, Sir Richard Hoare was granted the Freedom of the Goldsmiths' Company on 5 July 1672, which marks the foundation of Hoare's Bank. Richard established his business at the sign of the Golden Bottle in Cheapside, London; since street numbering was unknown in those days, signs were used to distinguish one business from another. In 1690, the business moved to Fleet Street, still within the City of London but on the main thoroughfare to the City of Westminster.

Goldsmiths were often used to safeguard cash and valuables, putting them in a unique position to evolve a system of banking. By 1677, some 58 goldsmiths kept "running cashes" and started to lend their customers' money for interest.

=== 18th century ===
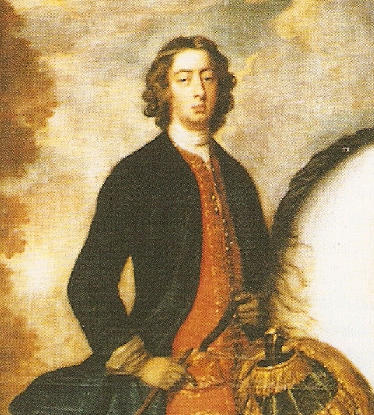
Henry Hoare, known as The Magnificent.

During the 18th century, the bank prospered; Richard Hoare was knighted by Queen Anne in 1702 and became Lord Mayor of London in 1712. After his death, the business was continued by two of his sons, Henry and Benjamin. They were both members of the Society for the Propagation of Christian Knowledge, which opened an account with Hoares in 1711. Many of those who held the first individual accounts with Hoare's were also connected to the Society, including Lady Elizabeth Hastings, Mary Astell and Joseph Smith.

Henry's son Henry Hoare, was a partner in the bank for nearly 60 years and dominated the family through his wealth and personal charisma. His nickname "The Magnificent" derived from his generosity as a patron of the arts and his expenditure on Stourhead in Wiltshire, a country house and estate bought by his father. Under his guidance, the bank introduced many innovations, such as printed cheques.

=== 19th century ===
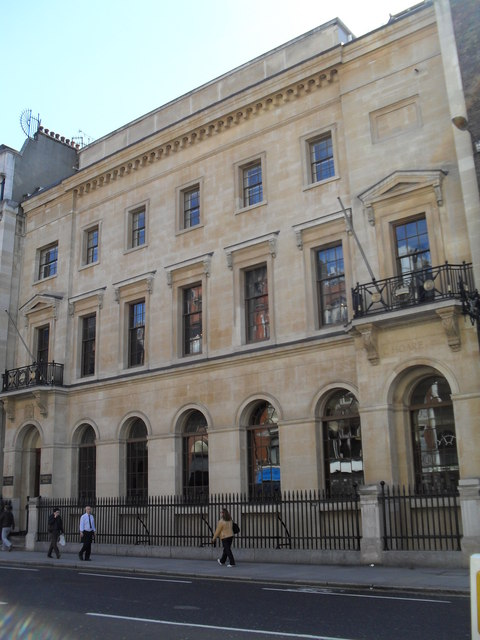
Original premises in Fleet Street.

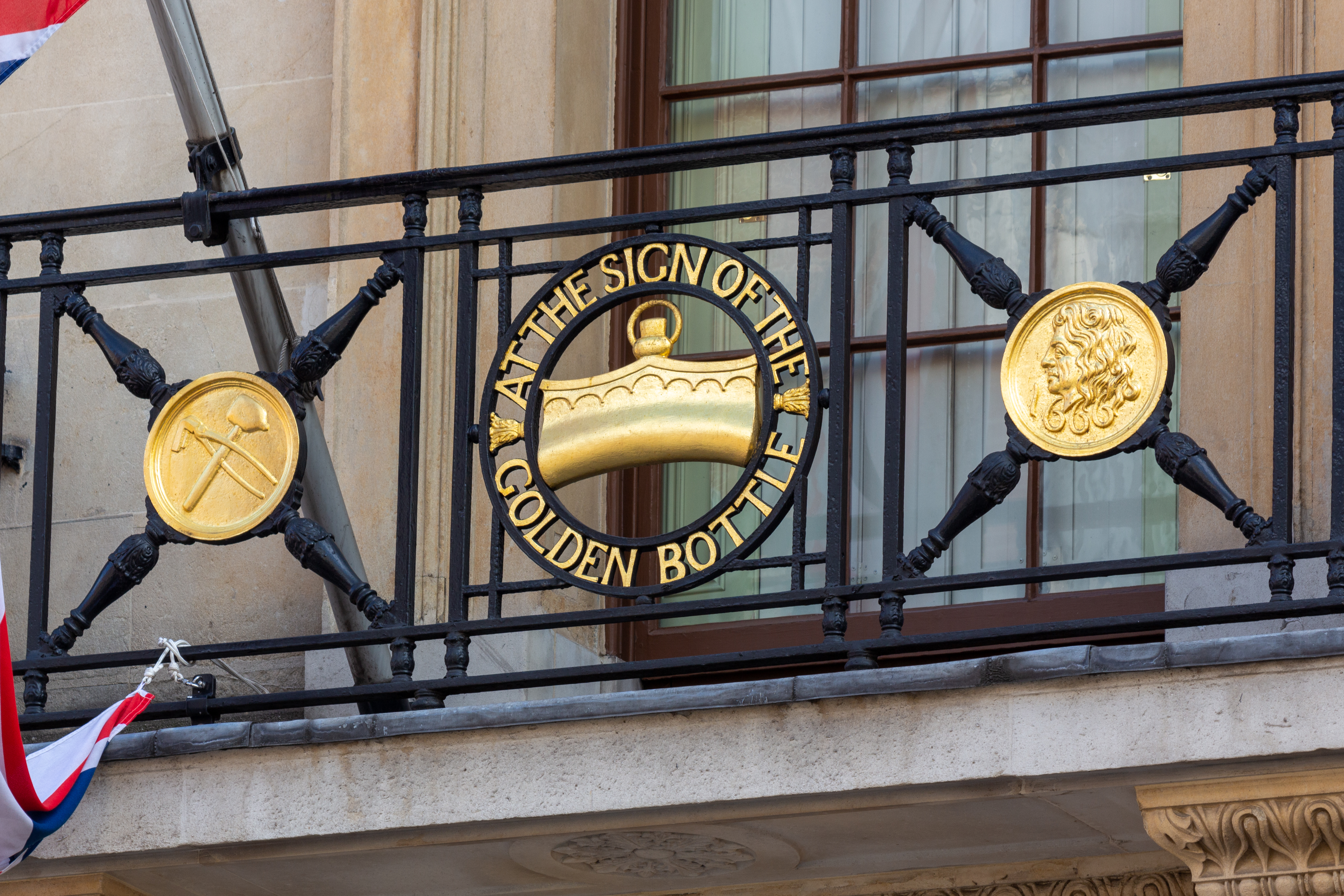
The Fleet Street premises feature a reference to the original "sign of the Golden Bottle"

The bank was well known for its discretion; in 1825, William Christmas embezzled £1,000 from the bank to fund his affair with actress Louisa Chatterley. He was sentenced to be transported to Australia for 14 years, and his father was obliged to honour the £1,000 fidelity bond he had posted when his son joined the bank.

In 1829, the premises at Fleet Street were rebuilt; the new banking house was designed to accommodate the business and a private house. Following the Bank Charter Act 1844, many of the 4,000 or so private banks disappeared but Hoares remained, led by Charles Hoare, the last senior partner to continue the practice of having the bank named after him.

After his departure, the bank was almost ruined through unsuccessful speculation and poor management by the senior partners, Henry and Peter Richard. Both were deeply religious but with differing views, and took it in turns to run the bank, each being in charge for a six-month period. Their sons, including Charles Arthur Richard Hoare, also became partners and proved financially unreliable, placing the future of the bank in peril.

=== 20th century ===
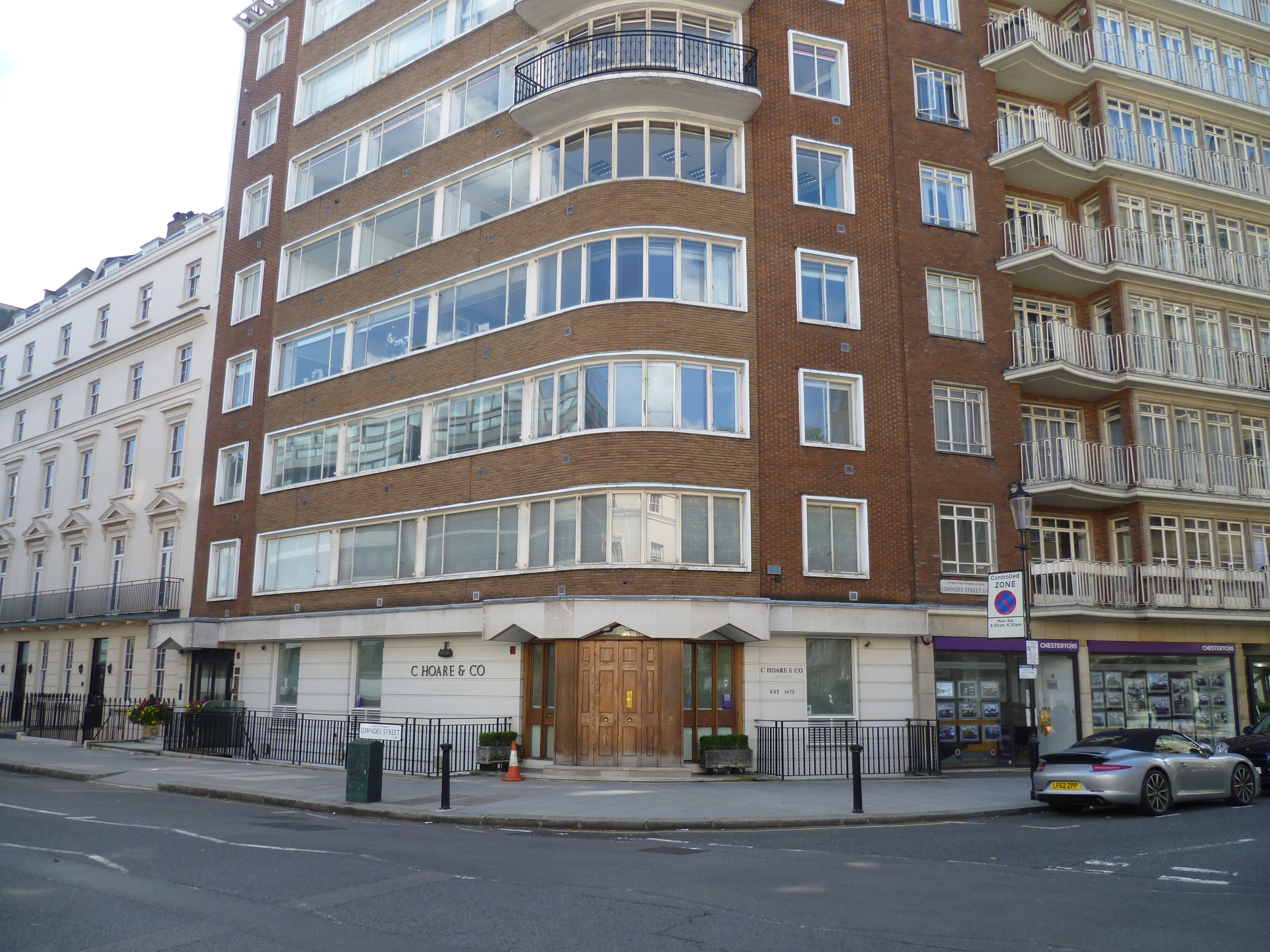
Lowndes Street branch

A revival of fortunes for the bank took place in the 20th century, with the early years seeing its credibility restored. After the First World War, most of the remaining private banks were absorbed by larger banks, leaving Hoares as the only surviving independent. It was a partnership until 1929 when the partners formed a private unlimited liability company, in which they were the sole shareholders.

During the Second World War, the bank's employees evacuated their offices, including the headquarters at 37 Fleet Street. A fire broke out during an air raid. However, due to the actions of a number of employees,, the historic building was saved. According to Alexander Hoare, his grandfather Bertram, the Fleet Street air warden at the time, was credited with saving the bank from burning down.

In 1987, Alexander S. Hoare, represented the eleventh generation to manage C. Hoare & Co.

=== 21st century ===
In 2008, the bank had around 10,000 customers, and a pretax profit of $32 million. Two-thirds of its income derived from deposits and loans.

Alexander S. Hoare was replaced by the first non-family member in an executive position: Jeremy Marshall, former head of Credit Suisse Private Bank in February 2009. Marshall stepped down and was replaced by deputy chief executive David Green in 2016. In 2021, Diana Brightmore-Armour, a veteran of Lloyds Corporate Banking and Coca-Cola, stepped in as CEO. In 2026 she was succeeded by Simon Kenyon.

In October 2016, Hoare sold its Wealth Management business to Cazenove Capital Management, owned by Schroders. This was followed in March 2017 by disposing of its investment dealing and custody business to Canaccord Genuity Wealth Management.

In 2018 Rennie Hoare, previously the head of philanthropy, was appointed a shareholding partner in an effort to bring “millennial thinking” into the bank.

The bank's profit for the year to March 2025 was £63.7 million, down from £80.8 million the year before. The total deposits at the bank amounted to £6.4 billion.

== In popular culture ==
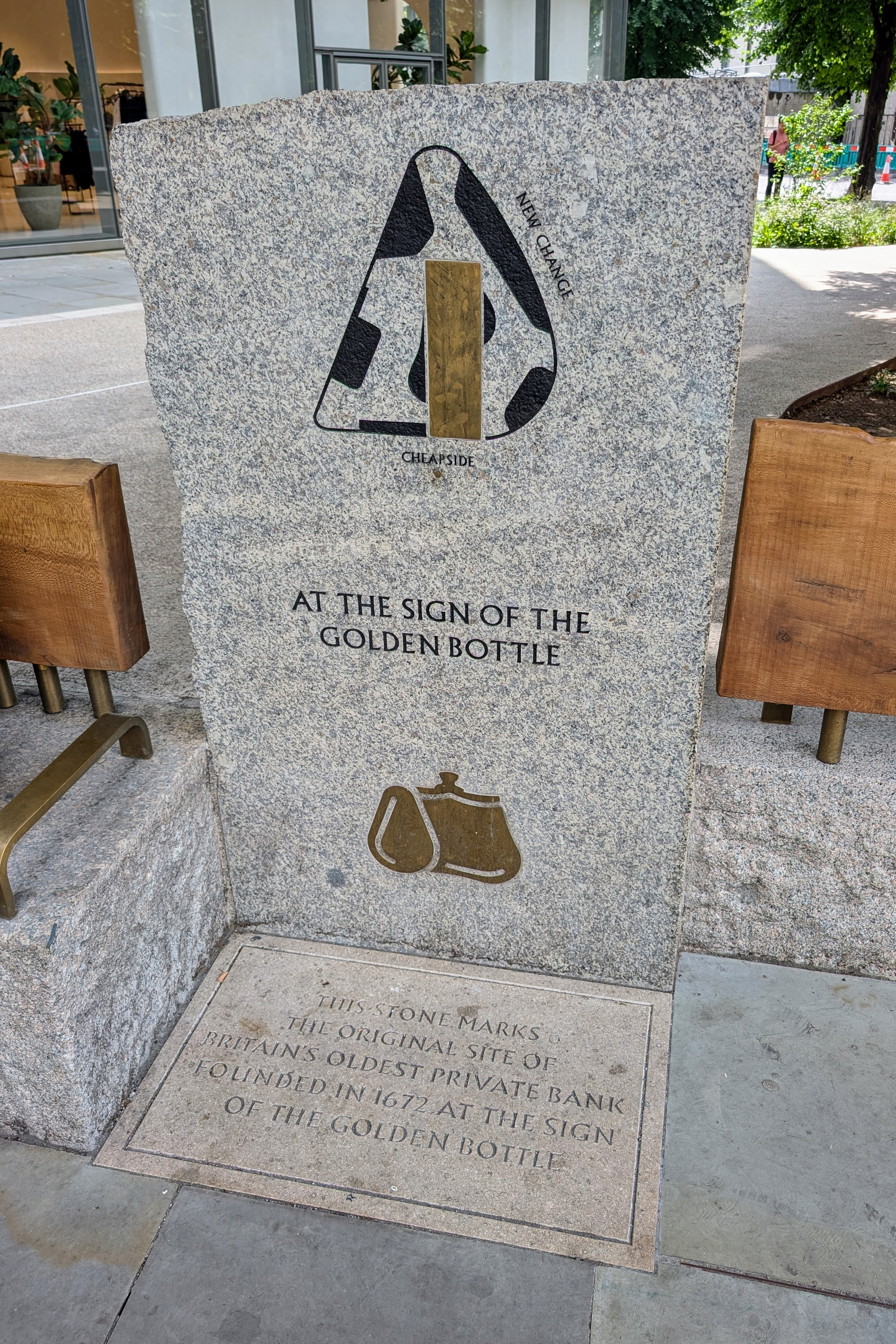
Stone marking the original site of the bank on Cheapside

In Georgette Heyer's 1965 Regency Romance novel The Grand Sophy, Sir Horace Stanton-Lacy, father of the heroine Sophy, banked with Hoare's.

In Master and Commander by Patrick O'Brian, captain Jack Aubrey tells his midshipmen that "[m]y bankers are Hoares", to their poorly concealed amusement.

In Tahir Shah's 2012 historical novel Timbuctoo, based on the 1816 memoir The Narrative of Robert Adams, C. Hoare & Co. were the bankers to The Royal African Committee (cf Royal African Company). Several scenes take place at Hoare's Bank on Fleet Street.

== Sources ==
- Hoare, Henry Peregrine Rennie (1932). Hoare's Bank; A Record 1673-1932. Butler & Tanner Ltd.
- Hutchings, Victoria (2005). Messrs Hoare Bankers: A history of the Hoare banking dynasty. Constable. ISBN 978-1841199658.
- Laurence, Anne (2010). "Lady Betty Hastings (1682–1739): godly patron" (PDF). Women's History Review. 19 (2): 201–213. doi:10.1080/09612021003633911. S2CID 145687985.
