= Crystal Palace National Sports Centre =

Sports centre in London, England

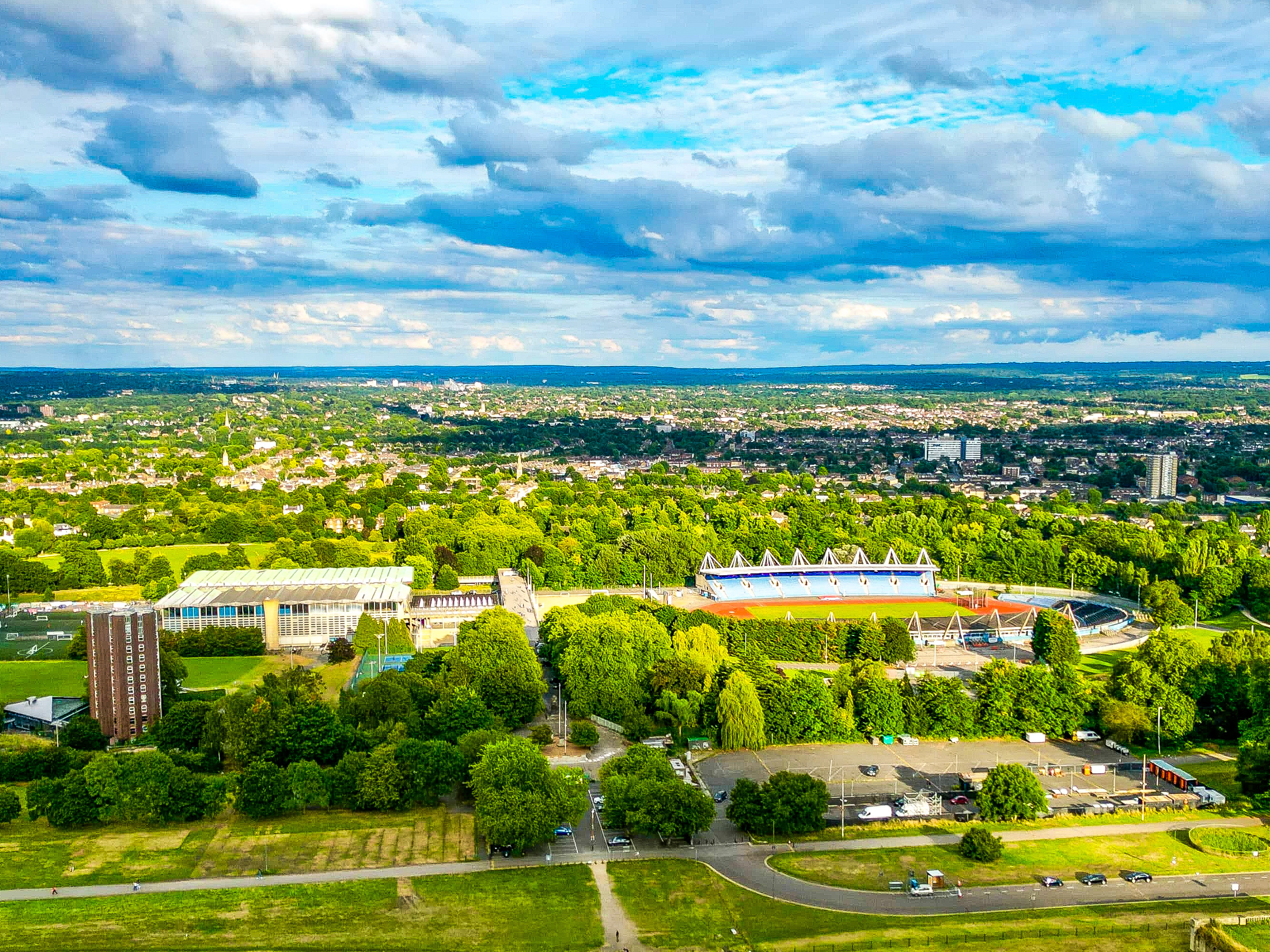
- The Crystal Palace National Sports Centre aerial view (2024)
- Interactive map of Crystal Palace National Sports Centre
- Location: Crystal Palace; London, SE19; England
- Coordinates: 51°25′08.7″N 0°04′07.7″W
- Operator: Greenwich Leisure Limited
- Capacity: 16,000 (24,000 With Temporary Seating)
- Public transit: Crystal Palace

Construction
- Groundbreaking: 1964
- Opened: 1964

Tenants
- Croydon F.C. (2020); AC London (2015–2016); London Lions (2012–2013); London Olympians (2012); London Towers (1998–2006); England Monarchs (NFL Europe) (1998)

Website
- www.gll.org/centre/crystal-palace-national-sports-centre.asp

The National Sports Centre at Crystal Palace in south London, England is a large sports centre and outdoor athletics stadium. It was opened in 1964 in Crystal Palace Park, close to the site of the former Crystal Palace Exhibition building which had been destroyed by fire in 1936, and is on the same site as the former FA Cup Final venue which was used here between 1895 and 1914.

It was one of the five National Sports Centres, run on behalf of Sport England, but responsibility was transferred to the London Development Agency (now GLA Land and Property) and is managed by Greenwich Leisure Limited, under their Better brand logo.

The athletics stadium has a capacity of 15,500, which can be increased to 24,000 with temporary seating. It has hosted international athletics meetings in the past.

As well as sporting events, the stadium has played host to live open air concerts, by artists including Coldplay, Bruce Springsteen, Sex Pistols and Depeche Mode.

== Architecture ==
The stadium is open to the air, and has a larger West Stand and a smaller Jubilee Stand (from 1977).

The indoor sports building was designed by the LCC Architects Department under project architect Norman Engleback, between 1953–54 and is a Grade II* listed building. It has a particularly interesting interior: there is a central concourse with a complex and delicate exposed concrete frame supporting the roof, which has a folded teak lining. The "wet" side of the central aisle houses a series of pools, including a 50m competition pool, and a diving pool with a dramatic reinforced concrete diving platform. The "dry" side has a smaller sports arena used for basketball, gymnastics and other sports.

The listing from Historic England describes the building as "exceptional in the breadth of its vision, not only in the range of facilities carefully planned within it, but also in being intended to serve serious performers from all nations (there is separate residential accommodation in the park) as well as local enthusiasts."

A hexagonal tower and low-rise communal area next to the main building provided accommodation for 130 athletes.

Since 2020 the 50m pool and diving pool have been closed for repairs, which will be funded by the Greater London Authority.

In March 2026, contractor Morgan Sindall submitted plans for refurbishment of the sports centre building (including improved access to its aquatics facilities), improvement of indoor sports zones, addition of new outdoor sports courts and pitches, and renovation of existing stadium stands plus addition of a new north Stand. The proposed redevelopment, designed by architect FaulknerBrowns and WOO Architects, was approved by Bromley Council in July 2026.

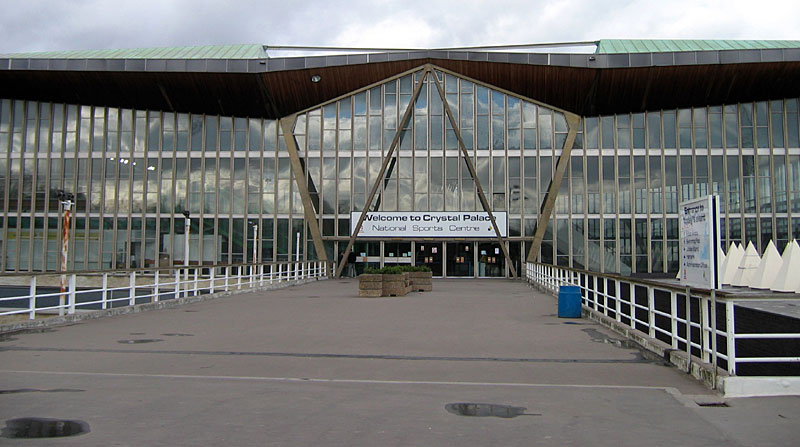
The National Sports Centre

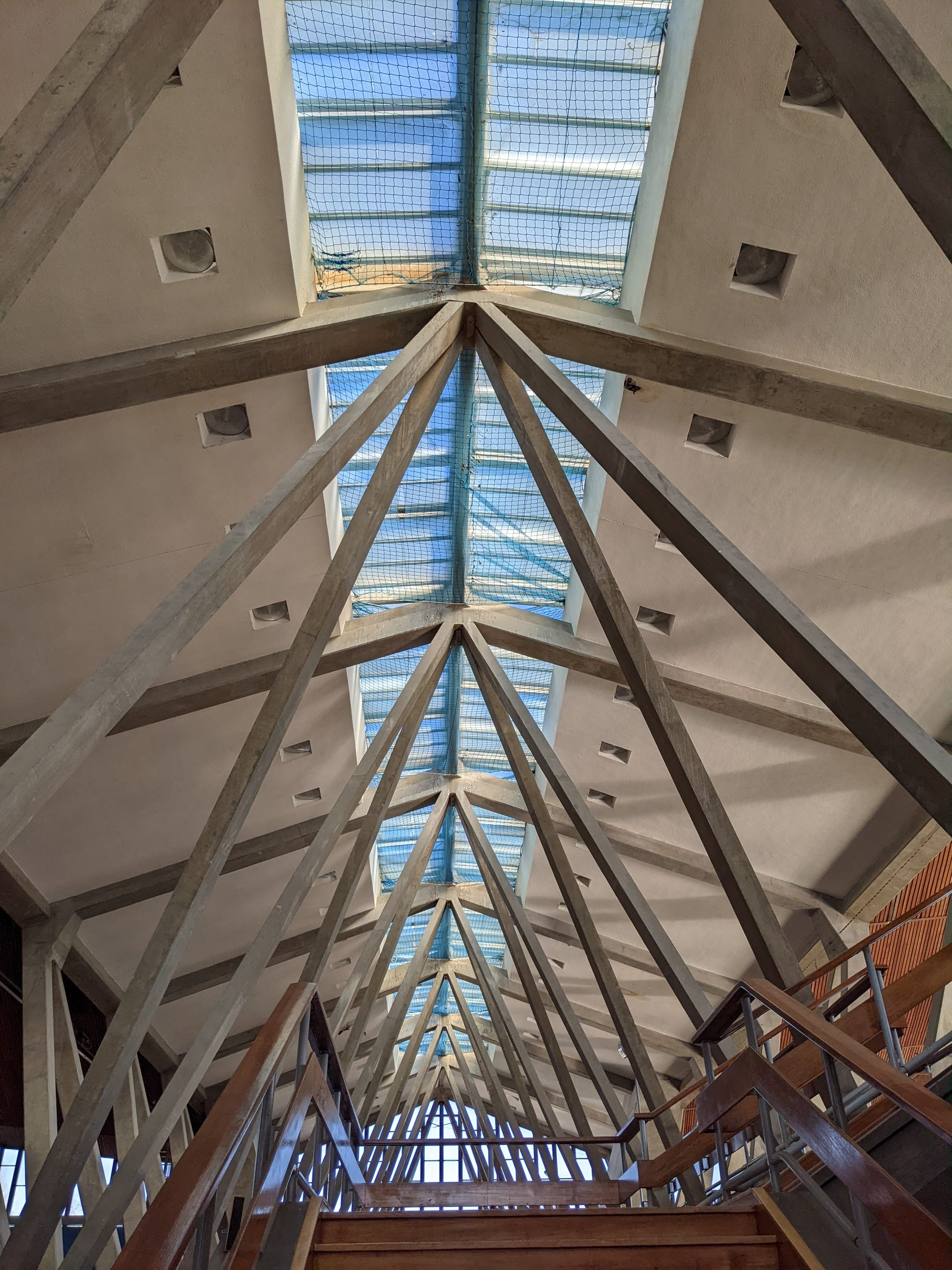
The central concourse with slender concrete supports

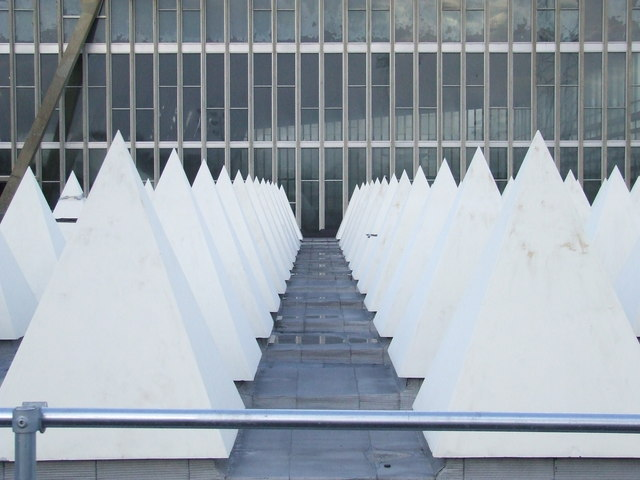
Sky lights

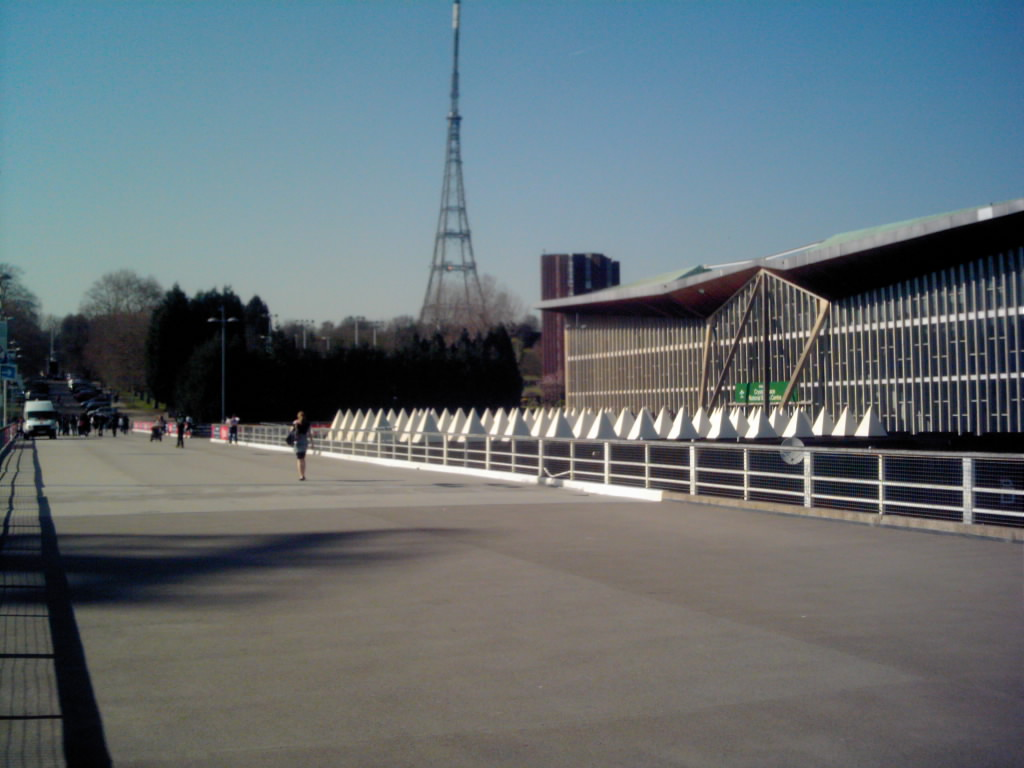
Centre and Crystal Palace transmitting station

== Sports ==
=== Cricket ===
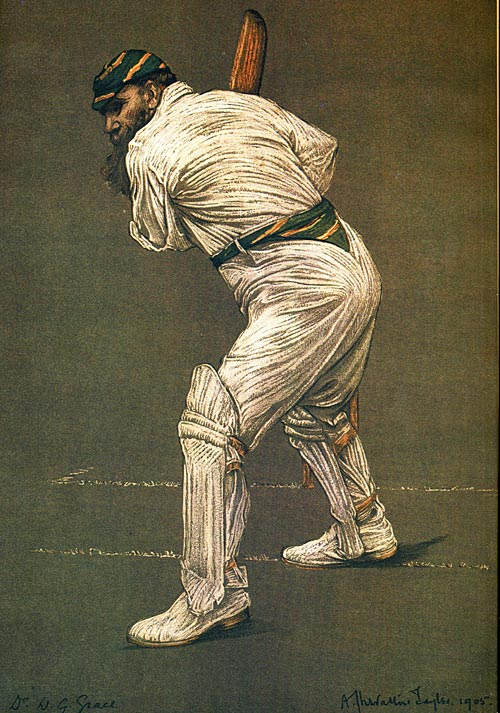
W. G. Grace in the colours of London County, painted by Albert Chevallier Tayler

The Crystal Palace Cricket Club was established here in 1857 and played at the cricket ground built in the Crystal Palace Park. Later on, the London County Cricket Club, a short-lived cricket club, was founded by the Crystal Palace Company to play at the cricket ground. In 1898, they invited W. G. Grace to help them form it as a first-class cricket club. Grace accepted the offer and became the club's secretary, manager and captain. As a result, he severed his connection with Gloucestershire County Cricket Club during the 1899 season. The club played first-class matches from 1900 to 1904. Some of the best players of the time played some matches for the club while continuing to play for their usual teams, among them CB Fry, Johnny Douglas and K S Ranjitsinhji. However, the games were little more than exhibition games – and money-making exercises for Dr Grace – and so it quickly lost its first-class status, and with that the ability to attract the top players. The club folded in 1908.

=== Football ===
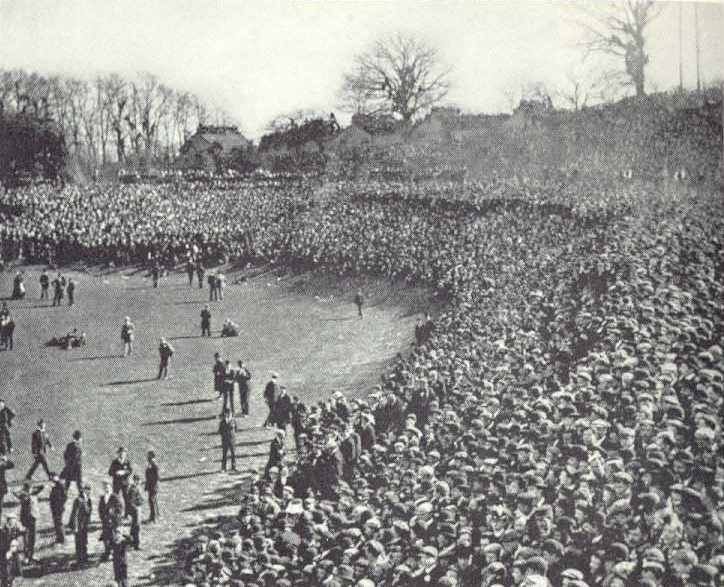
The stadium at the 1901 FA Cup Final

An amateur Crystal Palace football team founded in 1861, played at the Crystal Palace cricket ground. It had been formed out of the Crystal Palace Cricket Club to enable its players to continue sporting activities during the winter months. The current athletics stadium is on the same land as a previous football ground, which hosted the FA Cup final from 1895 to 1914 as well as other sports. In 1905, the owners wanted their own football club to play at the venue, so they formed the professional Crystal Palace F.C.. The club were forced to leave by the military in 1915, and now play at nearby Selhurst Park.

The largest 'domestic' attendance ever at the stadium was in the 1913 Cup final between Aston Villa and Sunderland, when 121,919 spectators squeezed into the stands. The previous world record had been the 1901 Cup final, when 114,815 amassed to watch Tottenham Hotspur and Sheffield United draw 2–2, (Spurs won the replay at Burnden Park).

The 1970–71 WFA Cup (Women's FA Cup) third-place match and final were held at the new stadium in 1971, the first final of the modern competition; it was won by Southampton Women.

In January 2011, the owners of Crystal Palace F.C. announced plans to relocate the club back to their original home at the site of the National Sports Centre, redeveloping it into a 40,000-seater, purpose-built football stadium. However, the club have since shelved these plans to opt for a redevelopment of Selhurst Park. Tottenham Hotspur F.C. also released plans to redevelop the NSC into a 25,000-seater stadium, maintaining it as an athletics stadium, as part of their plans to redevelop the Olympic Stadium after the 2012 Summer Olympics and Paralympics. However, their plans were cancelled due to their failure to obtain the Olympic Stadium.

The now defunct football team AC London used the stadium for their home games in the club's 2015–16 season. Croydon F.C. announced a temporary switch of home ground to Crystal Palace in 2020, but only played one match there.

==== International football matches ====
- 3 April 1897 – England 1–2 Scotland
- 30 March 1901 – England 2–2 Scotland
- 1 April 1905 – England 1–0 Scotland
- 3 April 1909 – England 2–0 Scotland
- 4 March 1911 – England Amateurs 4–0 Belgium

==== FA Cup Finals (1895–1914) ====
21 teams competed in the twenty FA Cup Finals staged at Crystal Palace, with ten different winners. Four more teams won the FA Cup during this time, after replays at other grounds. Newcastle United appeared in the most finals at the ground, five, but never lifted the cup there, whilst Aston Villa won all four of their finals.

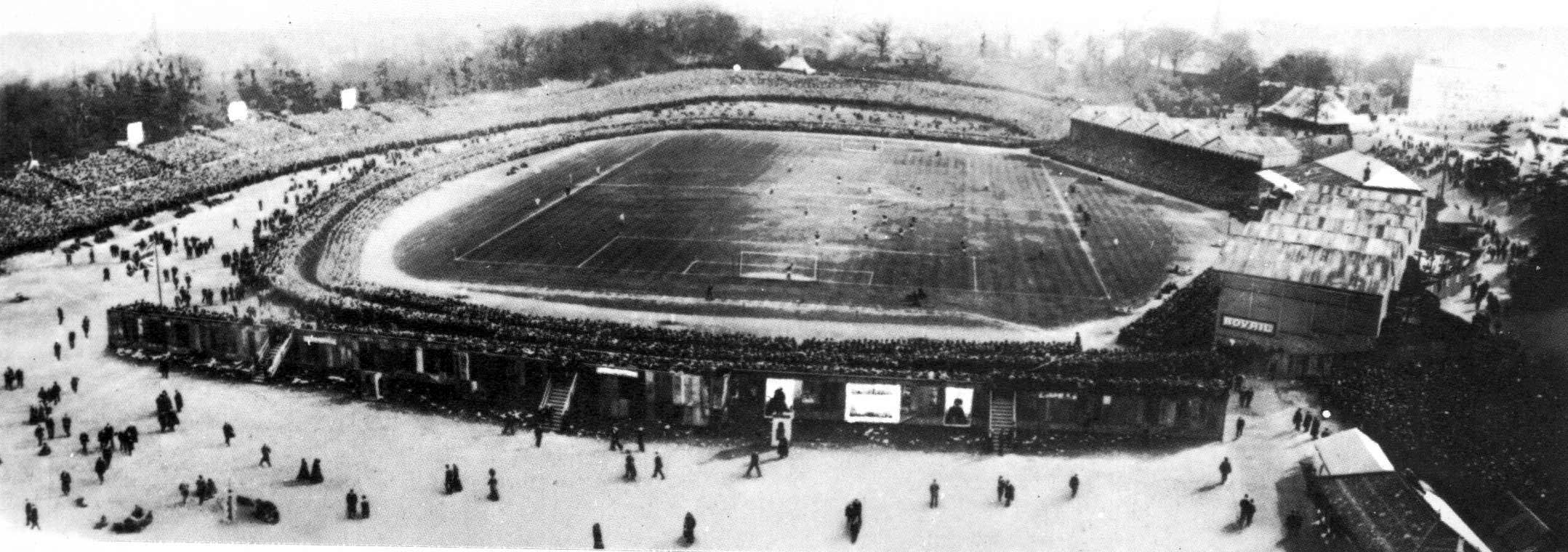
A panoramic view of the Crystal Palace ground during the 1905 FA Cup Final, the only such photograph of the stadium known to exist

Results of FA Cup Finals at Crystal Palace
Year	Attendance	Winner		Runner-up		Notes
1895	42,560	Aston Villa	1	West Bromwich Albion	0	
1896	48,036	Sheffield Wednesday	2	Wolverhampton Wanderers	1	
1897	65,891	Aston Villa	3	Everton	2	
1898	62,017	Nottingham Forest	3	Derby County	1	
1899	73,833	Sheffield United	4	Derby County	1	
1900	68,945	Bury	4	Southampton	0	
1901	110,802	Tottenham Hotspur	2	Sheffield United	2	3–1 in replay at Burnden Park, Bolton
1902	76,914	Sheffield United	1	Southampton	1	
Replay	33,050	Sheffield United	2	Southampton	0	
1903	64,000	Bury	6	Derby County	0	Joint-largest ever cup final victory
1904	61,734	Manchester City	1	Bolton Wanderers	0	
1905	101,117	Aston Villa	2	Newcastle United	0	
1906	75,609	Everton	1	Newcastle United	0	
1907	84,584	Sheffield Wednesday	2	Everton	1	
1908	74,967	Wolverhampton Wanderers	3	Newcastle United	1	
1909	67,651	Manchester United	1	Bristol City	0	
1910	76,980	Newcastle United	1	Barnsley	1	2–0 in replay at Goodison Park, Liverpool
1911	69,098	Bradford City	0	Newcastle United	0	1–0 in replay at Old Trafford, Manchester
1912	54,434	Barnsley	0	West Bromwich Albion	0	1–0 in replay at Bramall Lane, Sheffield
1913	120,028	Aston Villa	1	Sunderland	0	
1914	72,778	Burnley	1	Liverpool	0	

FA Cup Final wins at Crystal Palace
4	Aston Villa
2	Bury, Sheffield United, Sheffield Wednesday
1	Burnley, Everton, Manchester City, Manchester United, Nottingham Forest, Wolverhampton Wanderers

FA Cup Final appearances at Crystal Palace
5	Newcastle United
4	Aston Villa
3	Derby County, Everton, Sheffield United
2	Barnsley, Bury, Sheffield Wednesday, Southampton, West Bromwich Albion, Wolverhampton Wanderers
1	Bolton Wanderers, Bradford City, Bristol City, Burnley, Liverpool, Manchester City, Manchester United, Nottingham Forest, Sunderland, Tottenham Hotspur

Goals scored in FA Cup Finals at Crystal Palace
10	Bury
9	Sheffield United
7	Aston Villa
4	Everton, Sheffield Wednesday, Wolverhampton Wanderers
3	Nottingham Forest;
2	Derby County, Newcastle United, Southampton, Tottenham Hotspur
1	Barnsley, Burnley, Manchester City, Manchester United
0	Bolton Wanderers, Bradford City, Bristol City, Liverpool, Sunderland, West Bromwich Albion

Goals conceded in FA Cup Finals at Crystal Palace
13	Derby County
7	Newcastle United, Southampton
5	Everton, Sheffield United
3	Wolverhampton Wanderers
2	Aston Villa, Sheffield Wednesday, Tottenham Hotspur
1	Barnsley, Bolton Wanderers, Bristol City, Liverpool, Nottingham Forest, Sunderland, West Bromwich Albion
0	Bradford City, Burnley, Bury, Manchester City, Manchester United

=== Athletics ===
The current 15,500 seater athletics stadium was built on the site of the football ground by M J Gleeson and opened in 1964. It became a major national venue for athletics meetings such as the AAA's & WAAA's, during the 1970s and 1980s. From 1999 to 2012 it hosted the London Grand Prix. However, the stadium has not been used regularly in recent years and subsequently fell into a state of disrepair. In May 2025, the Mayor of London announced that a major redevelopment was to be carried out on the National Sports Centre, including the athletics stadium, and would be completed by 2028.

=== Rugby ===
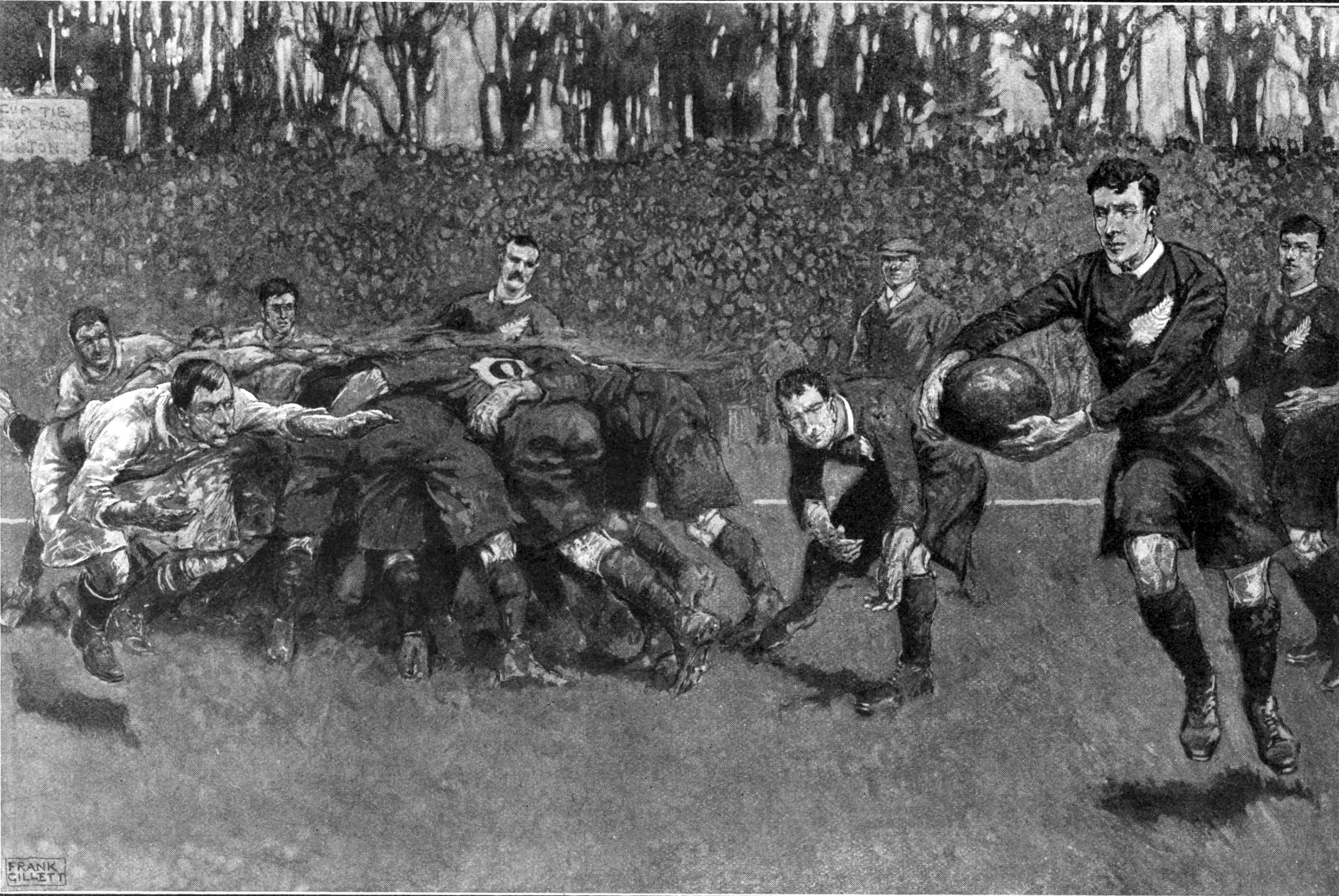
England v The Original All Blacks, before a then record crowd of 45,000 in 1905

On 2 December 1905, the ground also held the first England rugby union international match against New Zealand in England, New Zealand winning 15–0.

On Wednesday 18 August 1965, the ground was the venue of the rugby league match in which the Commonwealth XIII rugby league team were defeated 7–15 by New Zealand.

It also played host to Fulham Rugby League in the mid-1980s for a couple of seasons, after they were forced to leave their previous ground of Craven Cottage. Timeline at Crystal Palace1990: Returned to the Crystal Palace National Sports Centre (having previously played there in the mid-1980s as Fulham RLFC).1991–1992 & 1992–1993: Used the venue as their regular home ground under the newly rebranded London Crusaders name.1993: Played their final games there early in the year before relocating to Barnet Copthall in June 1993.

=== Beach Volleyball ===
Sand from the Beach Volleyball Courts at Horse Guards Parade during London 2012 was donated to Crystal Palace National Sports Centre in 2012. There are three courts outside the indoor building.

=== Basketball ===
London Lions used the basketball arena as their home from 2012 to 2013

The 2,000 capacity indoor Arena at the National Sports Centre was also home to former British Basketball League teams Crystal Palace and London Towers. Crystal Palace eventually merged into the London Towers organisation in 1998, whilst after great success domestically and in European competition the Towers ran into severe financial difficulties and folded its professional team in 2006. During its most successful period, Towers alternated between Crystal Palace and Wembley Arena as its home venues.

For the 2012–2013 season, the London Lions played the home games at Crystal Palace National Sports Centre until they moved to the brand new Copper Box in 2013.

From 2018, the Arena once more became a BBL venue when it was announced as the home of the new London City Royals franchise, the second London based franchise in the league.

=== Motor racing ===
Crystal Palace race circuit was located in Crystal Palace Park, the outline of the track can still be seen on maps providing access to the Crystal Palace National Sports Centre that is also located in the park.

The circuit opened in 1927 and the first race, for motorcycles, was on 21 May 1927. The circuit was 1 mile long, and ran on pre-existing paths through the park, including a loop past the lake. The surface had tarmac-covered bends, but the straights only had hard-packed gravel.

Improvements begun in December 1936 increased the circuit to 2 miles, and tarmac-covered the entire length. 20 cars entered the first London Grand Prix on 17 July 1937, a race eventually won by Prince Bira in his ERA R2B Romulus at an average speed of 56.5 mph (91 km/h). Later that year, during the International Imperial Trophy meeting also won by Bira, the BBC broadcast the first ever televised motor racing.

With the outbreak of World War II, the park was taken over by the Ministry of Defence, and it would not be until 1953 that race meetings could take place again. The circuit had been reduced in length to 1.39 miles, bypassing the loop past the lake, and pressure from the local residents reduced motor sport in the park to five days a year. A variety of races took place at the circuit including sports cars, Formula Three, the London Trophy for Formula Two, and even non-championship Formula One races.

The last International meeting was in May 1972, the final lap record going to Mike Hailwood at an average speed of 103.39 mph (166 km/h). The final meeting was held on 23 September 1972, but club events continued until 1974. Although the circuit no longer exists, it can be driven in the Grand Prix Legends historical motor racing simulation, for which it was recreated in detail. It was later converted to several other racing simulation programs. Adjacent to the Olympic swimming pool exists a small race circuit for radio-controlled cars. The site is the home of the London Radio Car Club (LRCC).

The first British Motor Show (then known as the 'London Motor Show', which was one of the first of its kind in the world), was held at Crystal Palace in 1903. Organised by the Society of Motor Manufacturers and Traders (SMMT) it subsequently moved to Olympia for the next 32 years.

==== Reuse of circuit ====
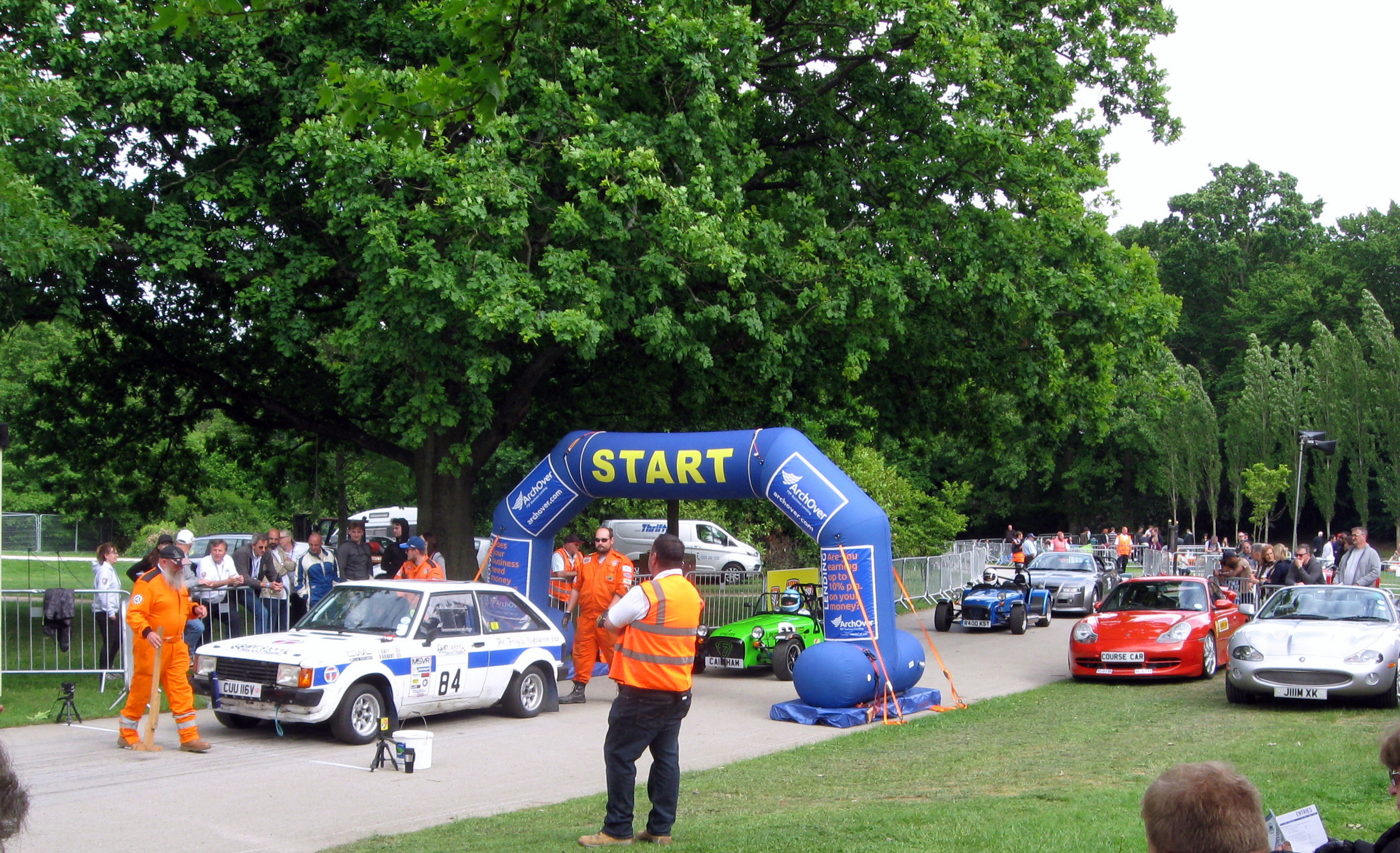
The start line at the 2019 sprint event

In 1997, the Sevenoaks & District Motor Club started a series of sprint events using part of the old infield link, the main straight and north tower corner. The events lasted three years before being stopped due to park development work. Following discussions with the local council and the London Development Agency, sprint racing restarted at the park, with the two-day event held 30/31 May 2010. This event was repeated on the same or adjacent weekend each year, until 2017, when it was held on the August Bank Holiday weekend. The event was suspended in 2018 but took place in May 2019. It was scheduled to take place again in May 2020 and May 2021 but was cancelled due to the COVID-19 pandemic.

=== Tennis ===
The Crystal Palace National Recreation Center as it was first called opened in 1964. A number of notable tennis tournaments were held their including;

- Dewar Cup Finals
- Rothmans European Trophy Indoor

=== American football ===
In 1988, the stadium hosted the first regular season college football game in Europe, in which Richmond defeated Boston University, 20–17.

The stadium hosted the 1989 National Championship Game for American Football, called the Budweiser Bowl, where the Manchester Spartans won the Great Britain National Championship by defeating the Birmingham Bulls by a score of 21–14. This National Championship Game was broadcast nationally on Channel 4. This was the height of the Great Britain – NFL relationship and partnership as the NFL supported the game, and the NFL commissioner and front office attended the game. The Cleveland Browns and the Philadelphia Eagles players and cheerleaders also attended, as they were the two teams who were playing the next day in the American Bowl at Wembley Stadium. The NFL's Tex Schramm presented Spartan player/head coach Terry Smith with the National Championship Trophy at Wembley Stadium the next day.

The stadium also hosted the 1990 National Championship Game for American Football, called the Coca-Cola Bowl, where the Manchester Spartans repeated as the Champions of Great Britain, winning their second National Championship in a row by defeating the Northampton Storm by a score of 21–19. The NFL also attended the 1990 Great Britain Championship Game at Crystal Palace, as did the players and cheerleaders for the New Orleans Saints and the Los Angeles Raiders as they were the two teams playing in the American Bowl the next day at Wembley Stadium.

The Manchester Spartans second National Championship came only one week after the Spartans had won the European Club Championship in Italy when the Spartans defeated Dublin, Amsterdam, Berlin, and Milan to become the first British team to ever win the European Club Championship.

The player/head coach of the Manchester Spartans was Terry Smith, who also was the Great Britain National Team Head Coach. With Smith at the helm of the Great Britain National Team in 1989, and with 12 Spartans players playing for Great Britain, the Spartans players and coach led Great Britain to the European Nations Championship in 1989 by defeating France, Germany, and Finland by a combined score of 99–6 for Great Britain's first European Championship for the Great Britain National Team.

The Sports Arena was also used by the London Monarchs, who also played some games at the stadium as England Monarchs before the team became defunct. The Monarchs were unfortunately never able to follow up on their title-winning success in the inaugural World League of American Football season of 1991, never again making it to another World Bowl, the playoffs, or even a second winning record. Their title defence never materialised, ending 1992 with a 2–7–1 tally; after a two-year league hiatus, four seasons from 1995 to 1998 in a revived league of six European cities garnered three straight 4–6 records, before bowing out with a 3–7.

The main stadium pitch is currently used by the London Olympians and is the home of the Great Britain Lions, the national American football team. The stadium played host to the 2011 Britbowl, the championship game of the British American Football League, which was won by the London Blitz.

=== Professional wrestling ===
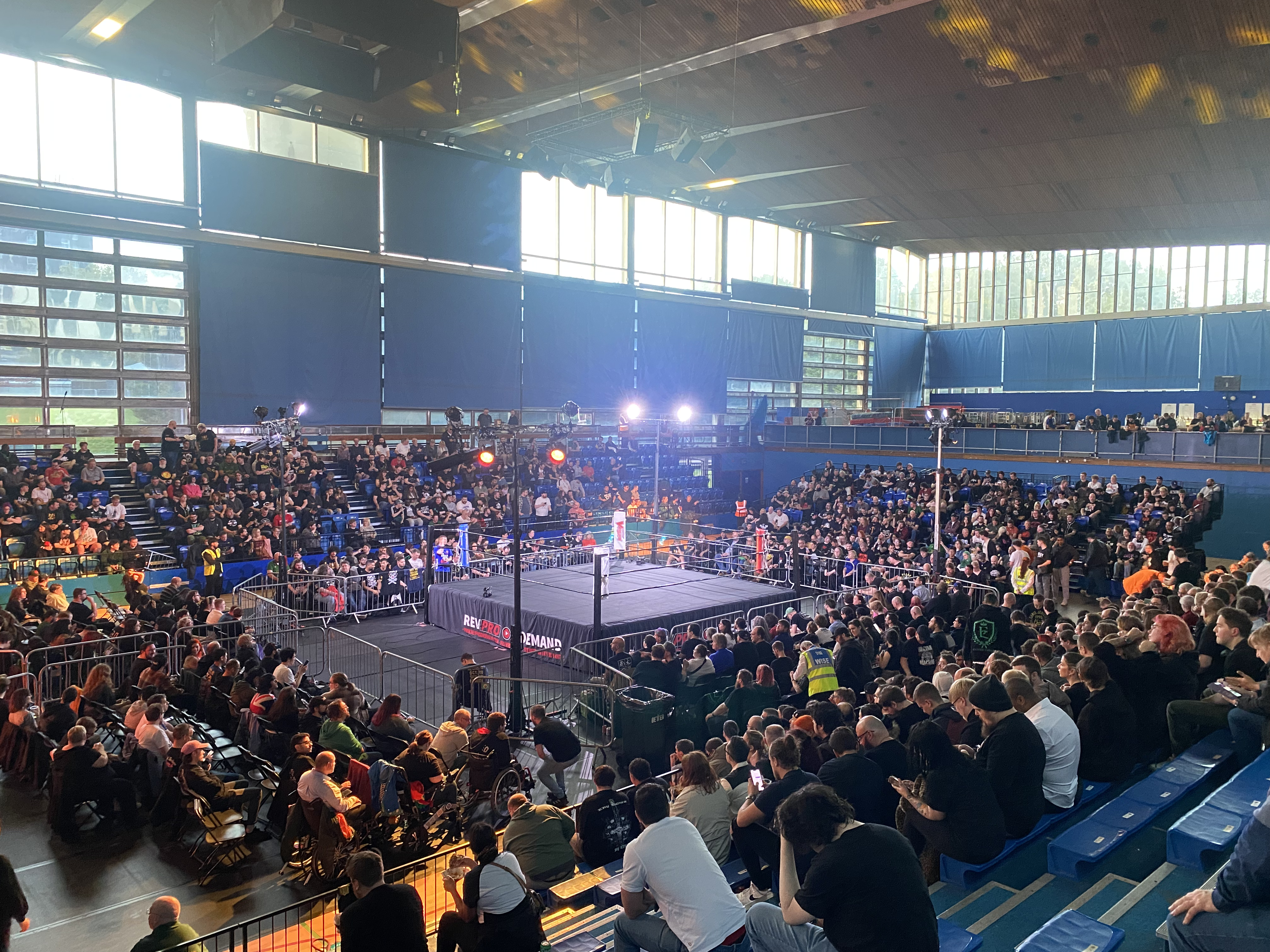
Fans file in for NJPW Royal Quest IV, 20th Oct 2024

The Sports Centre's indoor sports arena has played host to professional wrestling events beginning in May 2018, with American independent promotion Ring of Honor hosting the second show of their ‘Honor United’ UK Tour.

In 2022, Japanese promotion New Japan Pro Wrestling hosted Royal Quest II, which took place over two nights on the 1st and 2 October and returned in October 2024 to host Royal Quest IV. These shows featured a mix of New Japan's regular roster along with talent from Joshi (all female) partner promotion Stardom and British partner promotion Revolution Pro Wrestling (RevPro), who also assisted with production.

RevPro hosted two events of their own, Uprising in December 2023 and High Stakes: Ospreay vs Oku in February 2024. Both shows featured talent from New Japan, with Uprising also featuring talent from Mexican promotion CMLL and High Stakes featuring All Elite Wrestling (AEW) star Orange Cassidy as a surprise entrant in the opening match, with AEW CEO Tony Khan also in attendance. High Stakes’ main event was the final match for Will Ospreay as a regular fixture on the British independent wrestling scene before joining AEW full time. High Stakes drew the Sports Centre's largest crowd for pro wrestling with over 3000 attendees.

=== Climbing ===
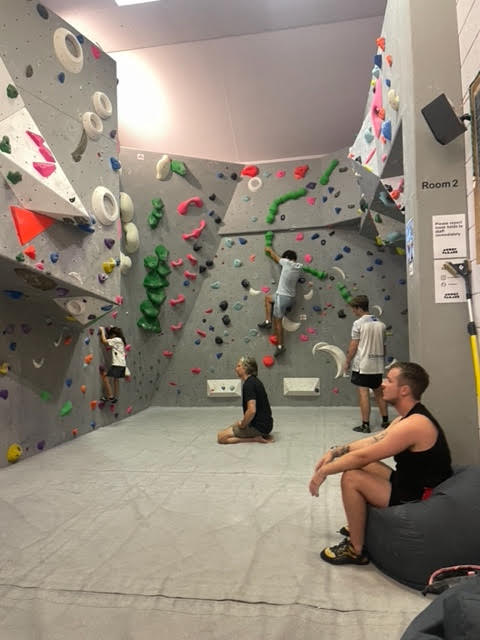
Indoor Bouldering at Mount Palace Climbing Centre (2025)

Established in 1991, climbing is hosted at the sports centre. The current climbing wall was built in 2010 and offers indoor bouldering and roped climbing. Since 2018, the centre has been known as Mount Palace. It was closed from March 2019 to March 2025 due to the COVID-19 pandemic and resultant organisational difficulties; its current location is due to be closed on 12 December 2026 due to the sport centres redevelopment. As a response, Milo Ogidel authored Palace; a climbing, bouldering, and buildering guidebook in November 2026 to promote climbing outside of the centre and within the park.

== Crystal Palace Sports Arena ==
Crystal Palace Sports Arena
- Interactive map of Crystal Palace Sports Arena
- Owner: Crystal Palace F.C.
- Operator: Crystal Palace F.C.
- Capacity: 25,000 (Initial); 40,000 (Proposed)
- Surface: Desso GrassMaster

Construction
- Cost: £50,000,000 to £70,000,000

Tenant
- Crystal Palace F.C. (Proposed)

Crystal Palace Sports Arena was a proposed football stadium to be built in Crystal Palace Park, to replace Selhurst Park as the home ground of Crystal Palace Football Club. It was announced in January 2011, as a redevelopment of the current Crystal Palace National Sports Centre, and was planned to be ready for the 2015–16 football season. The club submitted plans to rebuild the stadium as a 40,000 seater football stadium without a running track, but with a new indoor aquatic and sports centre as part of the complex. A London Tramlink extension to the area was proposed to coincide with the completion of the stadium.

However, by 2013, the club had abandoned those plans to instead concentrate on redeveloping their existing home. On 19 April 2018, Palace were given approval by Croydon Council to expand Selhurst Park to a 34,000 capacity.

Preceded by Goodison Park; Liverpool	FA Cup; Final Venue; 1895–1914	Succeeded by Old Trafford; Manchester
