= Crystal Palace Park =

Victorian park in London, England

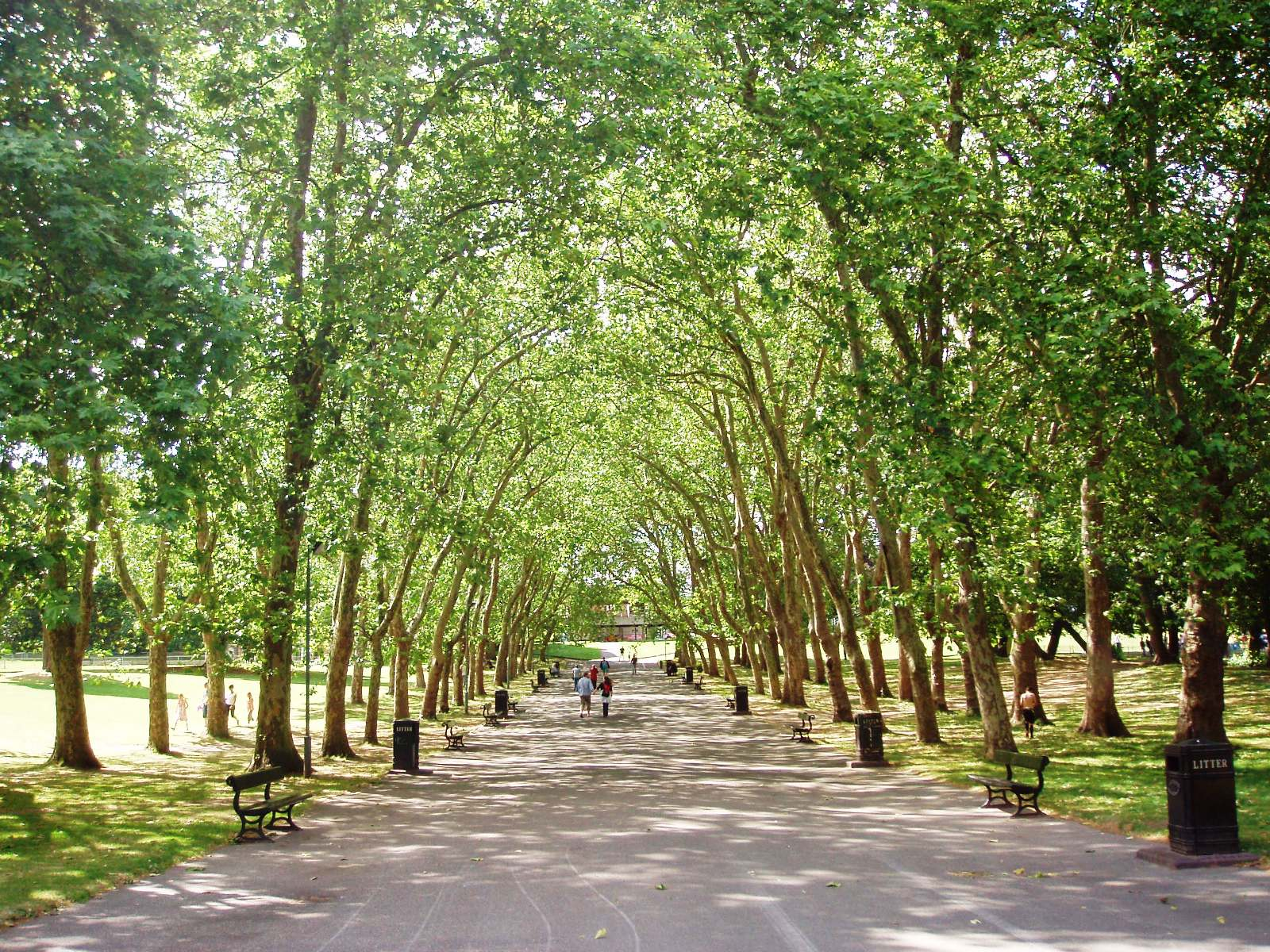
- Crystal Palace Park

- Location within Greater London
- Type: Public park
- Location: Crystal Palace; London, SE19; United Kingdom
- Coordinates: 51°25′15″N 0°04′12″W
- Area: 200 acres (81 ha)
- Created: 1854
- Operator: London Borough of Bromley
- Status: Open all year
- Public transit: Crystal Palace
- Website: crystalpalaceparktrust.org

Crystal Palace Park is a large Victorian park in south-east London, Grade II* listed on the Register of Historic Parks and Gardens. It was laid out in the 1850s as a pleasure ground, centred around the re-location of The Crystal Palace – the largest glass building of the time – from central London to this area on the border of Kent and Surrey; the suburb that grew around the park is known by the same name.

The Palace had been relocated from Hyde Park after the 1851 Great Exhibition and rebuilt with some modifications and enlargements to form the centrepiece of the park, before being destroyed by fire in 1936. The park features full-scale models of dinosaurs in a landscape, a maze, lakes, and a concert bowl.

After the relocation of the Palace, sports facilities were built in the park, including a cricket ground which became the home of the Crystal Palace Cricket Club in 1857. Kent County Cricket Club played a county match at the ground against Nottinghamshire in 1864. The London County Cricket Club also played matches at the cricket ground from 1900 to 1908, when they folded, but the ground continued to stage a number of other first-class cricket matches. The site contains the National Sports Centre, previously a football stadium that hosted the FA Cup Final from 1895 to 1914, as well as Crystal Palace F.C.'s home matches from 1905, until the club was forced to relocate during the First World War.

The park is situated halfway along the Norwood Ridge at one of its highest points. This ridge offers views northward to central London, eastward to the Queen Elizabeth II Bridge and Greenwich, and southward to Croydon and the North Downs. The park remains a major London public park; originally maintained by the LCC and then the GLC, but with the abolition of the GLC in 1986 the park and its management were moved into the London Borough of Bromley. Since 2023, much of the park has been managed by Crystal Palace Park Trust, with the GLA continuing responsibility for the National Sports Centre complex. It also has one of the largest weekly outdoor Farmers' Markets in London. The park has also played host to organised music events such as the Wireless Festival.

== History ==
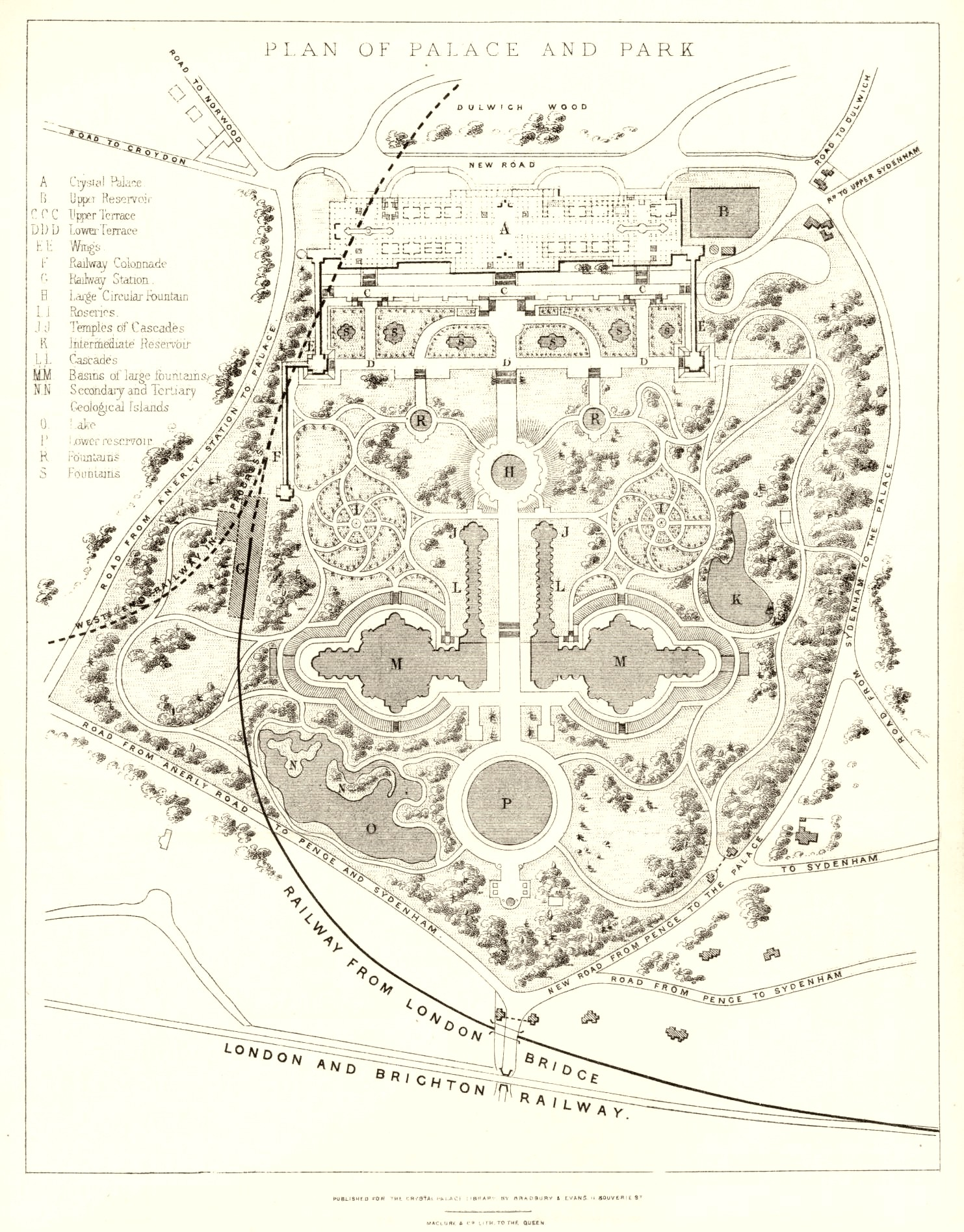
An 1857 plan of the ground of Crystal Palace and park

After the 1851 Great Exhibition in Hyde Park, Sir Joseph Paxton appealed for the retention of The Crystal Palace in Hyde Park, but the government decreed that the Palace be removed. Paxton formed the Crystal Palace Company to purchase the Hyde Park Crystal Palace for £70,000, as well as a new site at the summit of Sydenham Hill on the Kent/Surrey border for the construction of an enlarged Crystal Palace which cost a total of £1.3 million. The 389-acre site consisted of woodland and the grounds of the mansion known as Penge Place owned by Paxton's friend and railway entrepreneur Leo Schuster.

This land as enclosed in 1827 previously made up the northern part of Penge Common, a large area of wood pasture which abutted the Great North Wood. Between 1852 and 1854, an enlarged and redesigned Crystal Palace was rebuilt at the new site, set in a park constructed by Paxton's Crystal Palace Company.

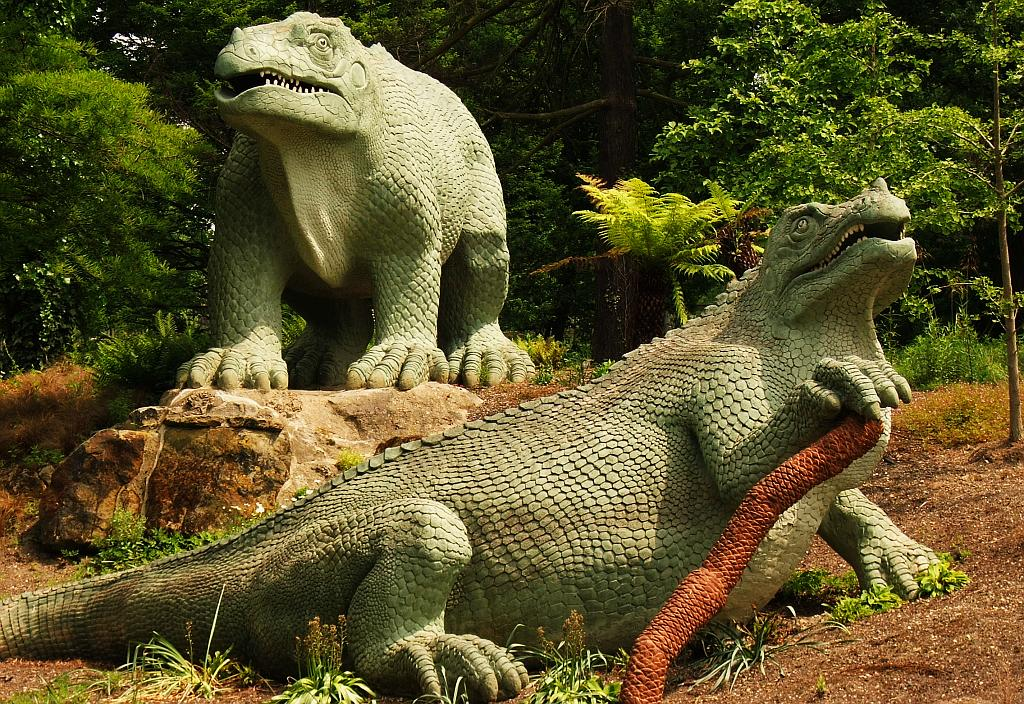
Benjamin Waterhouse Hawkins's Iguanodon statues

The development of ground and gardens of the park (which straddled the border between Surrey and Kent) cost considerably more than the rebuilt Crystal Palace. Edward Milner designed the Italian Garden and fountains, the Great Maze, and the English Landscape Garden, and Raffaele Monti was hired to design and build much of the external statuary around the fountain basins, and the urns, tazzas and vases. The series of fountains constructed required the building of two 284 ft (87 m) high water towers, designed by Isambard Kingdom Brunel, at either end of the palace. The sculptor Benjamin Waterhouse Hawkins was commissioned to make 33 life sized models, completed in 1854, of the (then) newly discovered dinosaurs and other extinct animals in the park. The park was also given a gift of a megatherium skull by Charles Darwin. The rebuilt Crystal Palace was opened by Queen Victoria in June 1854.

Rail access to the park became possible when the Crystal Palace railway station opened in 1854. In 1864, Thomas Webster Rammell experimented with a 600-yard pneumatic railway in the tunnel between the Sydenham and Penge gates to the park. In 1865, another station, the Crystal Palace (High Level) railway station opened, but this station closed in 1954.

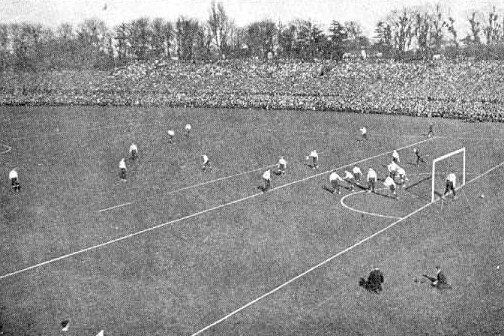
The 1901 FA Cup final at Crystal Palace between Tottenham Hotspur and Sheffield United

The park has been used for various sporting activities from its early days. The Crystal Palace Park Cricket Ground was created on the site in 1857, as the home venue for the Crystal Palace Cricket Club. It was later used by the London County Cricket Club between 1900 and 1904. Cycling has also had a long history at the park, with organised velocipede races first held in 1869, making Crystal Palace one of the earliest venues for competitive cycling in Britain. In 1894, the two largest fountains were grassed over and the south basin was converted to a football stadium in 1895. The stadium was used to host FA Cup Finals for 20 years starting with the 1895 FA Cup Final until 1914. Crystal Palace F.C. also played their home matches at the stadium from 1905 to 1915.

In 1911, the Festival of Empire was held at the park and the park was transformed with buildings designed to represent the British Empire. Many of these buildings remained at the site until the 1940s.

In 1936, The Crystal Palace was destroyed by fire. The south water tower was demolished soon afterwards due to fire damage. The north water tower was demolished in 1941, perhaps to eliminate landmarks that German bombers might use to orient themselves during air raids in the Second World War.

A 400 ft-long Marine Aquarium was built in 1872 on a part of The Crystal Palace site left vacant after a fire in 1866, but it was not a financial success. A large section of it was destroyed during the demolition of the north water tower. The Crystal Palace transmitting station was built on part of the site of the aquarium in the 1950s.

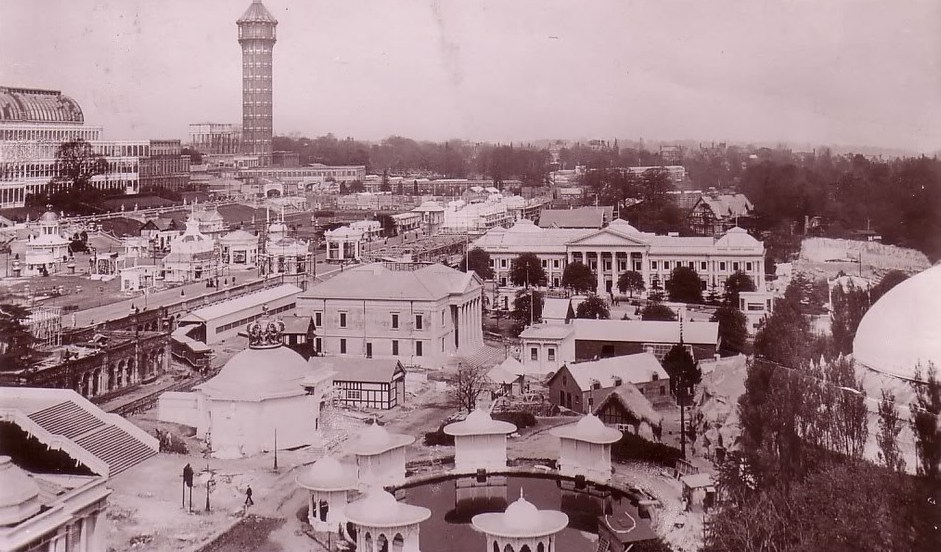
Festival of Empire held at the park in 1911

The park also housed one of the pioneer speedway tracks, which opened for business in 1928. The Crystal Palace Glaziers raced in the Southern and National Leagues up to 1933 when the promotion moved on to a track in New Cross. The extensive grounds were used in pre-war days for motorcycle racing and, after the 1950s, for motorcar racing; this was known as the Crystal Palace circuit. Large sections of the track layout still remain as access roads around the park. The circuit itself fell into disuse after the final race in 1972, although it has been digitally recreated in the Grand Prix Legends racing simulation and 2010 sees the 10 years of campaigning work to reopen the track culminating in Motorsport at the Palace.

The National Sports Centre (NSC) was built in 1964 on the old football ground. In 2005 the Mayor of London and the London Development Agency (LDA) took control of the NSC as part of London's bid for the 2012 Summer Olympics and Paralympics, and it is now managed by Greenwich Leisure on their behalf. The park also once housed a ski slope.

After the abolition of the Greater London Council, the ownership of the park was transferred to London Borough of Bromley in 1986, which oversaw a number of restoration works on the site. A third of the park was restored between 2001 and 2003, including the dinosaur figures.

=== 21st century and the Crystal Palace Park Trust ===
In 2007 the London Development Agency developed a Masterplan for the park that cost almost £70 million. Although the Masterplan received planning permission in December 2010, the funds were never identified.

In 2012, Dulwich Paragon Cycling Club took over organisation of the long-running Crystal Palace Criteriums (CPCrits), continuing the weekly Tuesday evening races for Youth, Junior, Senior & Elite categories.

In 2015 Bromley council committed resources to an adapted version of the 2007 Masterplan. This regeneration plan included plans to raise a £40 million endowment fund (largely through two residential developments and grant giving bodies) to establish a sustainable business model run by a new charitable trust that would eventually become the sole custodian of the park. A shadow board was established in 2016, becoming the Crystal Palace Park Trust in 2018 and a registered charity in 2021. The Trust took ownership of the park in 2023, work on regeneration began in May 2025 and is expected to be largely completed by 2027.

== Sites of interest ==
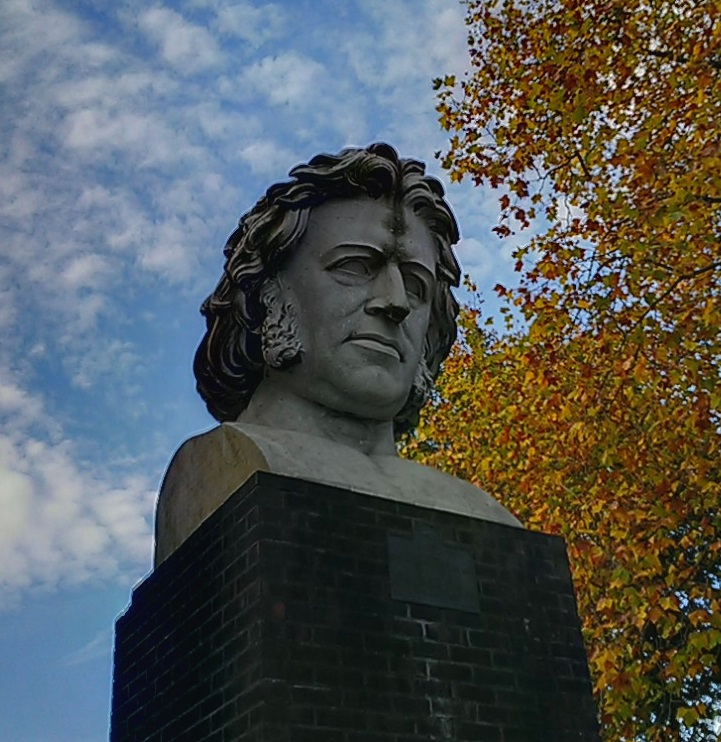
Bust of Joseph Paxton

The park contains a large bust of Sir Joseph Paxton, first unveiled in 1873. It was sculpted by William F. Woodington, and was originally located looking towards the Palace building over the central pool on the Grand Central Walk.

The Italian Terraces with their sculptures survive from the destroyed Crystal Palace. The upper and lower terraces are linked by flights of steps with sphinxes flanking each flight.

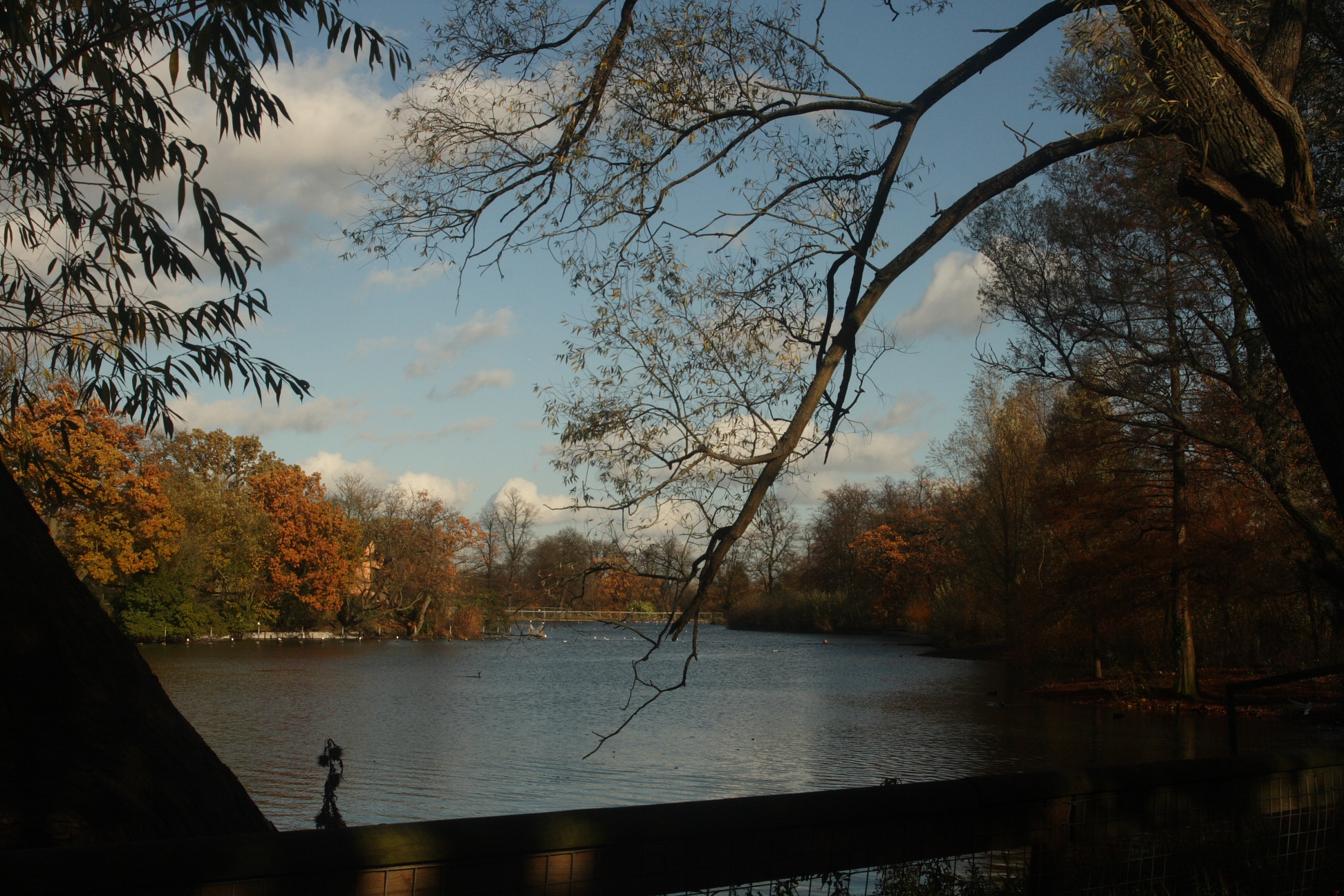
Upper Lake at the Park

The Crystal Palace Dinosaurs, a group of sculptures of dinosaurs and extinct mammals complete with a 'geological' landscape, are in and around the 'tidal lake' at the southeast side of the park.

A statue of Guy the Gorilla by the sculptor David Wynne was erected in Crystal Palace Park in 1961.

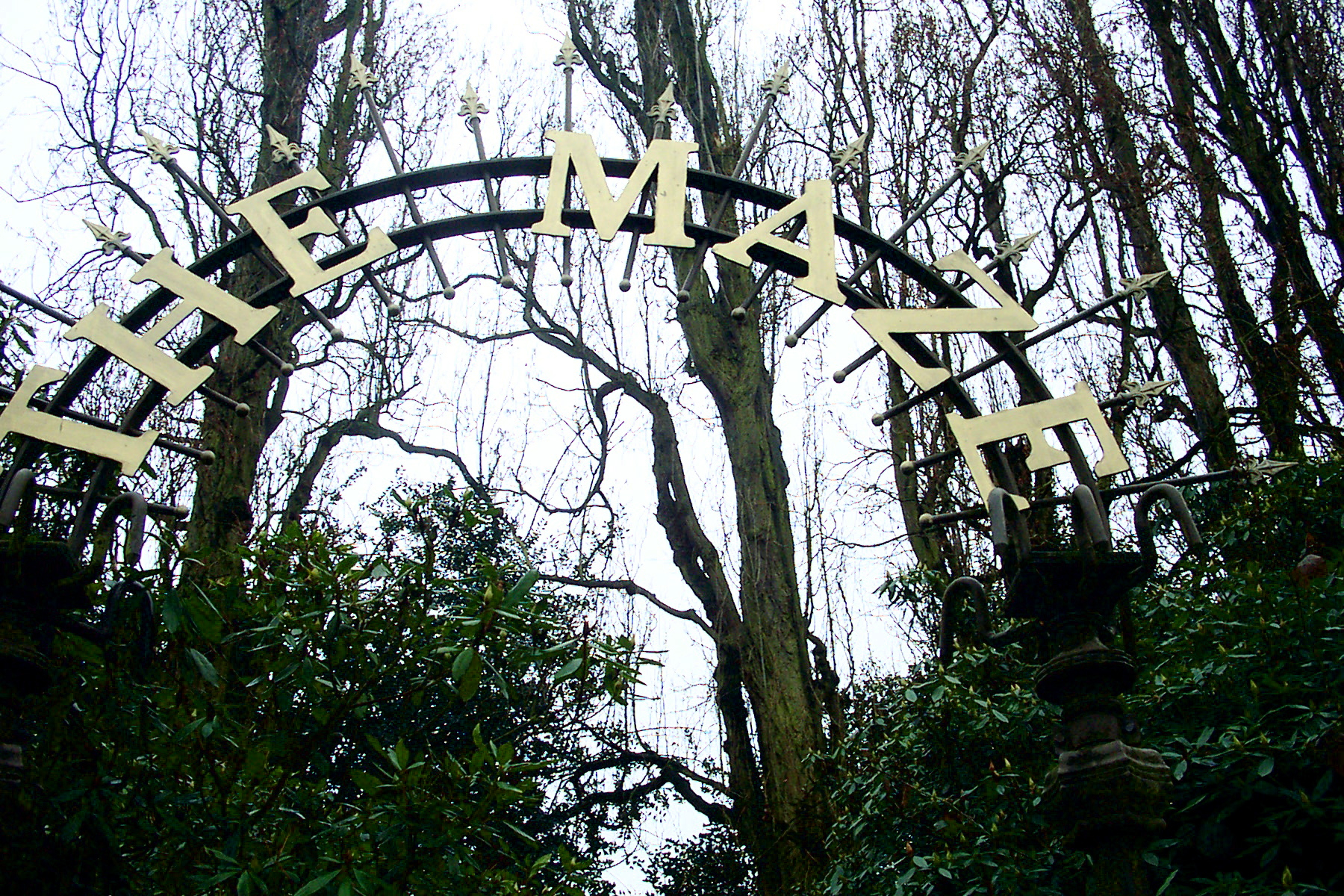
Entrance to the maze

The park contains a free maze. The maze is 160 ft (49 m) in diameter and occupies a total area of nearly 2,000 square yards (1,700 m^{2}). The maze was first created around 1870, and it was one of the largest mazes in the country. It later fell into disrepair but was replanted in 1987 by the London Borough of Bromley. In 2009, an artwork was set within the maze, which was restored to celebrate the centenary of the Girl Guide movement. A notice by the entrance to the maze informs of the park's link to the founding of the Girl Guides:

In 1909 during a Boy Scout rally held in the park a group of girls approached Lord Robert Baden Powell to demand the formation of a similar movement for girls. Baden Powell responded positively to the request and shortly afterwards published his Scheme for Girl Guides. Six thousand girls joined when the organisation was founded in 1910.

— Inscription in the park by the entrance to the maze

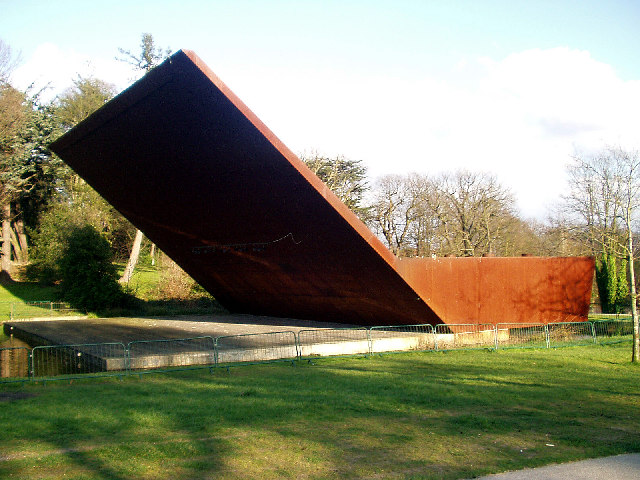
Crystal Palace Concert Bowl

In the northern corner of the park is the Crystal Palace Bowl, a natural amphitheatre where large open-air summer concerts were held for nearly 60 years, including Pink Floyd, Elton John, Eric Clapton and the Beach Boys. The Bowl hosted Bob Marley's largest and last ever concert in London on 7 June 1980, which was commemorated in October 2020 when a blue plaque was affixed to the structure. The stage was rebuilt in 1996 with a permanent structure designed by Ian Ritchie, which was nominated for the RIBA Stirling Prize, but it later fell into a state of disrepair and became inactive as a music venue. In 2020, London Borough of Bromley Council announced they are working with a local action group to find "creative and community-minded business proposals to reactivate the cherished concert platform".

A Royal Naval Voluntary Reserve (RNVR) Memorial Bell commemorating World War I was placed in the park. Crystal Palace was once used as a training ground for the Royal Navy, and was referred to as H.M.S. Victory VI. The bell was originally unveiled in 1931 on the terrace in the park (the location was called the "quarterdeck"), but moved to the present location in the 1970s. Although the wooden mounting survives, the bell with its supporting dolphins was stolen in August 2024.

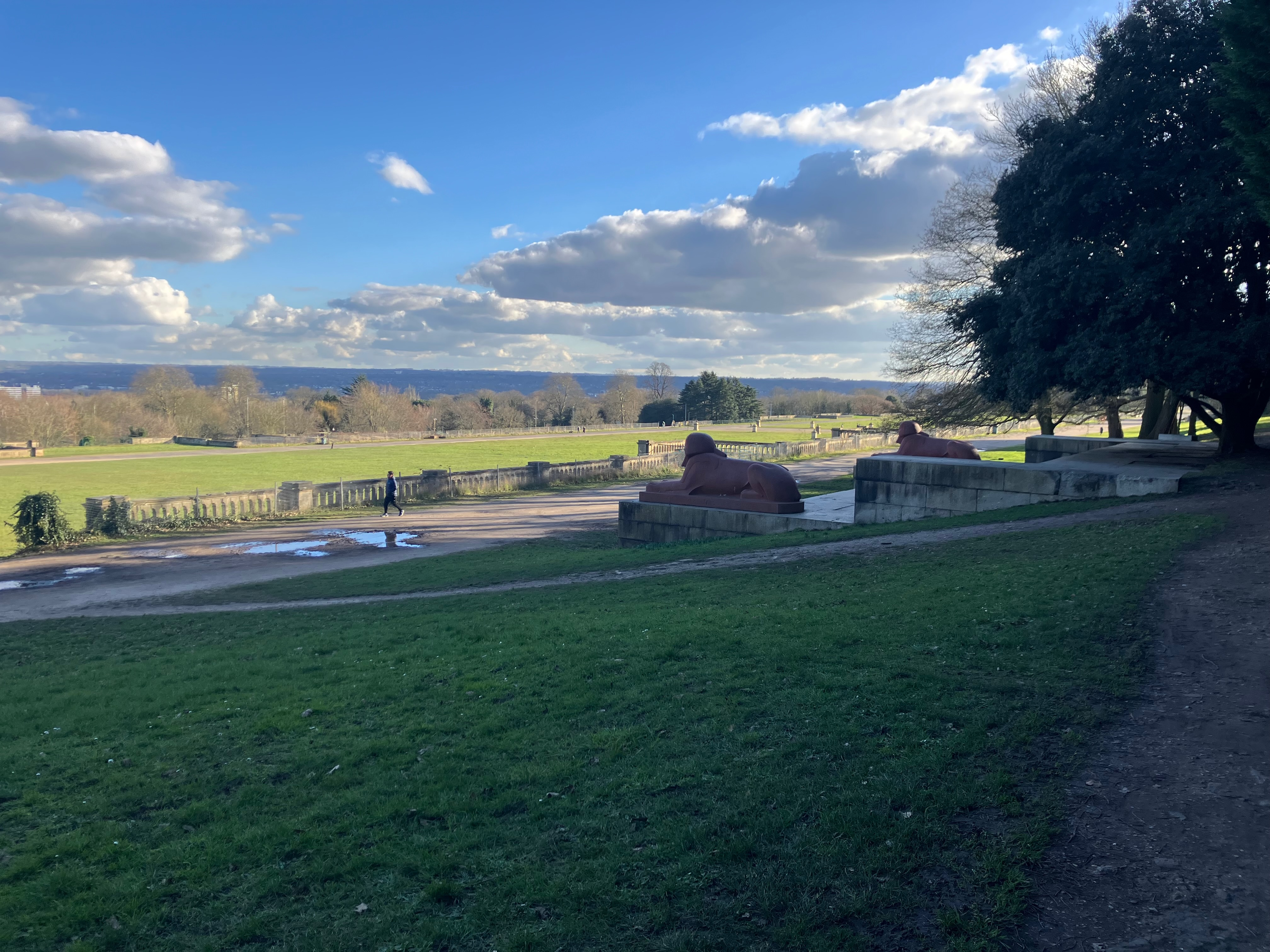
Crystal Palace Park view over Kent from Upper Terrace

The Crystal Palace Museum is housed in the only surviving building constructed by the Crystal Palace Company built circa 1880 as a classroom for the Crystal Palace Company's School of Practical Engineering.

The park is one of the starting points for the Green Chain Walk, linking to places such as Chislehurst, Erith, the Thames Barrier and Thamesmead. Section 3 of the Capital Ring walk round London goes through the park.

== Proposed developments ==
A number of proposals to redevelop the Crystal Palace Park have been put forward since the 1980s. The park was handed to the London Borough of Bromley after the abolition of the Greater London Council in 1986, and a long-fought-over local issue is whether to build on the open space which was the location of the original Crystal Palace building or to leave it as parkland as the Greater London Council had done. In 1989 Bromley proposed the development of the site for hotel and leisure purposes, it culminated in the passing by the House of Commons of the Bromley London Borough Council (Crystal Palace) Act 1990, which limits development on the site.

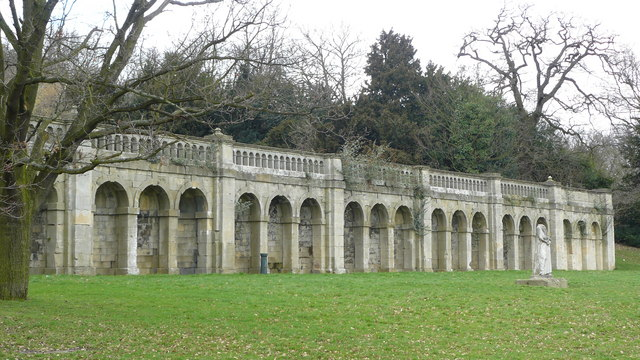
The Italian Terraces

In 1997, a planning proposal was submitted which involved 53,000 square metres of leisure floor space, including a 20-screen multiplex. The proposal was opposed by a local campaign group, the Crystal Palace Campaign, set up a month later.

In 2003, plan for a modern building in glass was submitted to the Bromley council.

In 2007, a £67 million master plan was drawn up by London Development Agency which includes the building of a new sports centre, the creation of a tree canopy to mimic the outline of the palace, the restoration of the Paxton Axis walkway through the park, but it also included a controversial proposal for housing on two parts of the park. It won government backing in 2010, and the plans were upheld by the High Court in 2012 after a challenge by a local group, the Crystal Palace Community Association.

In January 2011, the owners of Crystal Palace F.C. announced plans to relocate the club back to the site of the National Sports Centre from their current Selhurst Park home, redeveloping it into a 40,000-seater, football stadium. But by 2013, Palace had abandoned these plans, and instead proposed to redevelop Selhurst Park. In April 2018, Croydon Council approved the club's plans for a new 13,500-seater Main Stand, which would give Selhurst Park an overall stadium capacity of 34,000.

In 2013, a plan to build a replica of the destroyed Crystal Palace was proposed by a Chinese developer. Bromley Council however cancelled the exclusivity agreement with the developer in 2015. In February 2020 Bromley Council submitted a planning application for a £40 million park regeneration project, adapted from the 2007 masterplan.

In May 2025 the newly formed Crystal Palace Park Trust commenced work on a major regeneration plan, partly funded by selling two sites to Clarion Housing Association for social housing. The plans involve refurbishment of the Dinosaurs, park terraces and other historic elements, alongside new play areas and walkways. At the same time the GLA announced refurbishment of the National Sports Centre.

== Buildering ==
Climbing at the Red Blocks

Climbing, bouldering, and buildering has been practiced in Crystal Palace Park; this has been documented by Milo Ogidel, who in November 2026, authored a guidebook entitled Palace. The guidebook describes areas where non-commercial climbing, bouldering, and buildering is practised within the area of Crystal Palace Park. This includes climbing on the Italian Terraces and on concrete structures surrounding the National Sports Centre.
