= 2 Marsham Street =

Office building in London, England

Coordinates: 51.4957°N 0.1299°W

Home Office Building
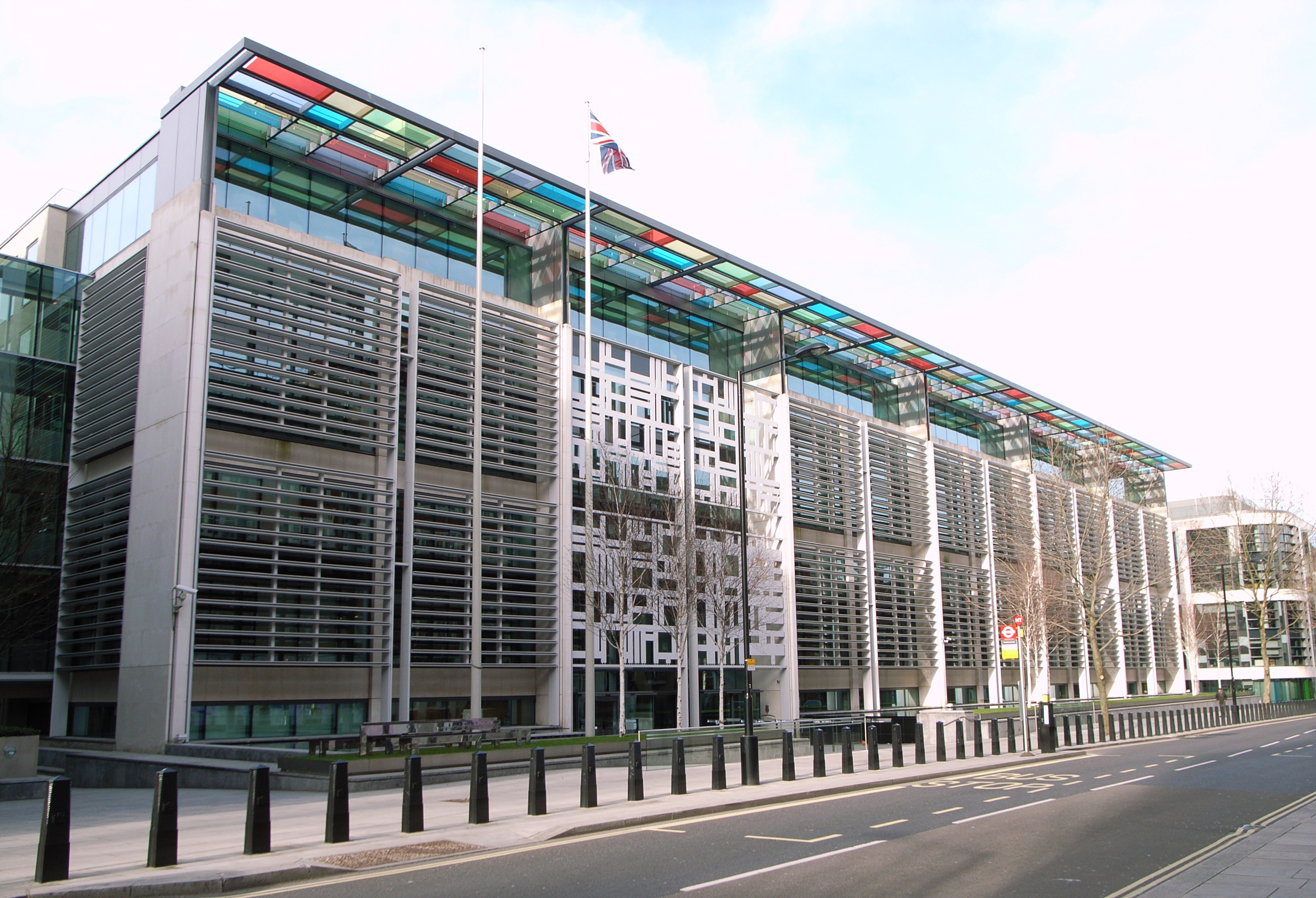
- Interactive map of the Home Office Building area

General information
- Status: Completed
- Location: 2 Marsham Street, SW1P 4DF, London, United Kingdom
- Construction started: 2003
- Opened: 2005
- Cost: £311 million
- Client: Home Office, Ministry of Housing, Communities and Local Government, Department for Environment, Food and Rural Affairs

Technical details
- Floor count: 7
- Floor area: 800,000 sq ft (74,000 m^{2})
- Lifts/elevators: 24

Design and construction
- Architect: Farrells
- Structural engineer: Pell Frischmann
- Main contractor: Bouygues
- Awards: RIBA Award for Architecture

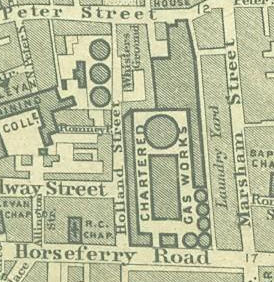
The Chartered Gas Works of the Westminster Gas Light and Coke Company, on what is now the site of the Home Office at 2 Marsham Street, as indicated in the 1862 Edward Stanford map of London

2 Marsham Street is an office building on Marsham Street in the City of Westminster, London, and headquarters of the Home Office and Ministry of Housing, Communities and Local Government (and its predecessor bodies), departments of the British Government, since March 2005. Before this date the Home Office was located at 50 Queen Anne's Gate. It has also housed the headquarters of the Department for Environment, Food and Rural Affairs since 2018.

== History ==
The site was previously occupied by the Departments of Environment (DoE) and Transport (DfT). The headquarters offices of both departments were located in Marsham Towers—three 20-floor concrete towers (North, Centre and South) joined together by 'podium' floors to level 3. The towers won an architectural award, and boasted express lifts, marble entrances and escalators to the third floor—very modern government offices for the early 1970s. Construction had started in the early 1960s but was finally completed in 1971, becoming the office of the new DoE created in October 1970 (out of a merger between the Ministry of Housing and Local Government and the Ministry of Transport).

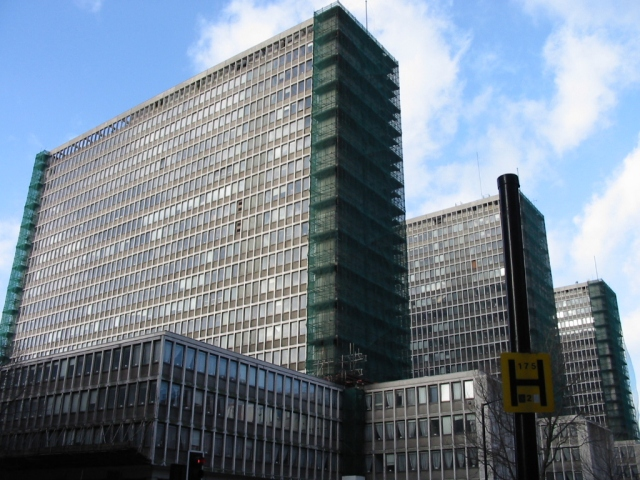
The Marsham Towers which previously occupied the site

The towers were considered by some to be a blot on London's landscape, and were subsequently nicknamed "the three ugly sisters" and "the toast rack". Michael Heseltine, the Secretary of State for the Environment in the late 1970s and early 1980s, allegedly said that the building offered the best view of London—because one could not see the towers from his north-facing 16th-floor office in the North tower. Chris Patten called the complex "a building that deeply depresses the spirit".

The last government staff occupied the building in the late 1990s. The building was declared unfit for future use and the towers were demolished in 2003 to make way for the new building into which the Home Office moved in 2005. Prior to the 'ugly sisters' epoch, from about 1818, the site housed the Chartered Gas Works of the Westminster Gas Light and Coke Company, as well as a laundry yard.

Soon after the building opened in 2005, agencies of the Home Office such as Her Majesty's Passport Office and the Advisory Council on the Misuse of Drugs began moving to new offices. From August 2014 to autumn 2018, the building was also home to the Department for Communities and Local Government, the Homes and Communities Agency and the Building Regulations Advisory Committee. In 2018, the Department for Environment, Food and Rural Affairs (Defra) relocated to 2 Marsham Street; Defra is itself a successor to the DoE that originally occupied the Marsham Towers site.

In 2018, Homes England (the reorganised Homes and Communities Agency) moved to Windsor House.

In 2022, the Office for National Statistics moved its London office from Drummond Gate into 2 Marsham Street.

== Design ==
Designed by Terry Farrell, the new building was financed through the private finance initiative (PFI) model with French construction firm Bouygues as contractor. It was completed within 24 months. The cost of £311 million was to be spread over 29 years, and is partially met by the issue of bonds. The site is made up of three buildings, designated Seacole, Peel and Fry. They are named after Mary Seacole, Robert Peel and Elizabeth Fry, figures who had significant impacts in areas within the Home Office's responsibility.

The buildings are connected by a bridge from the first to the fourth floors, forming part of a corridor that runs the whole length of the building. Staff call this corridor 'The Street'. During design, the emphasis was on creating a building with a community feel. To that end, the open-plan offices are well lit, situated around three central atria and overlooking turfed 'pocket parks'. The building has also been constructed to be energy efficient and to fall well within government energy-expenditure targets. The approachable effect of the building is enhanced by artwork by Liam Gillick, who used coloured glass to change the feel of the building depending on the light conditions.

The site contains 800,000 sq ft (74,000 m^{2}) of office space. Part of the old Marsham Towers site was also turned over to blocks of residential flats, shops and restaurants behind the new Home Office building.

== Critical reception ==
Since its completion in early 2005, 2 Marsham Street has been well received by the architectural community, winning a RIBA Award for Architecture, a Leading European Architects Forum and MIPIM 2006 Awards. Giles Worsley, architecture critic of The Daily Telegraph, called the building "a triumph of urban repair". The contractor's provision of the building within the time-frame required has also been praised. The Home Secretary at the time of the building's completion, Charles Clarke, stated "By moving to a newer, more efficient headquarters, the Home Office will save taxpayers around £95 million. This will contribute to the Home Office's programme to save £1.97 billion so that we can target more money at front line services like policing and border control."
