= Windsor House =

Windsor House may refer to:

- Windsor House (Belfast) – a high-rise building built in 1974
- Windsor House (Hong Kong) – a high-rise building built in 1979
- Windsor House, London – an office building built in 1973

It may also refer to:

- House of Windsor – the British royal family
- Joseph Windsor House at Iron County MRA in Michigan, United States
