= Crystal Palace Park Cricket Ground =

Cricket ground in Crystal Palace, England

- Carst Posthuma (left) and W. G. Grace in front of the cricket pavilion, at Crystal Palace in 1901
- Interactive map of Crystal Palace Park Cricket Ground

Ground information
- Location: Crystal Palace, London
- Country: England
- Coordinates: 51.421°N 0.064°W
- Establishment: 1857
- Capacity: 10,000

Team information
Crystal Palace Cricket Club	(1857–1900)
Kent County Cricket Club	(1864–1870)
South of England	(1899)
London County Cricket Club	(1900–1904)
- As of 8 September 2010; Source: CricketArchive

Crystal Palace Park Cricket Ground was a cricket ground in Crystal Palace in south-east London. It was located in Crystal Palace Park in the shadow of The Crystal Palace, and established on 3 June 1857 as the home ground for the Crystal Palace Cricket Club. It was used for first-class cricket between 1864 and 1906.

The site of the ground was part of the county of Kent when it was first established and it was used by Kent County Cricket Club in the 1860s, before becoming the main ground for the London County Cricket Club between 1900 and 1904. The site of the ground is now in the London Borough of Bromley and forms part of the Crystal Palace National Sports Centre.

== Cricket history ==
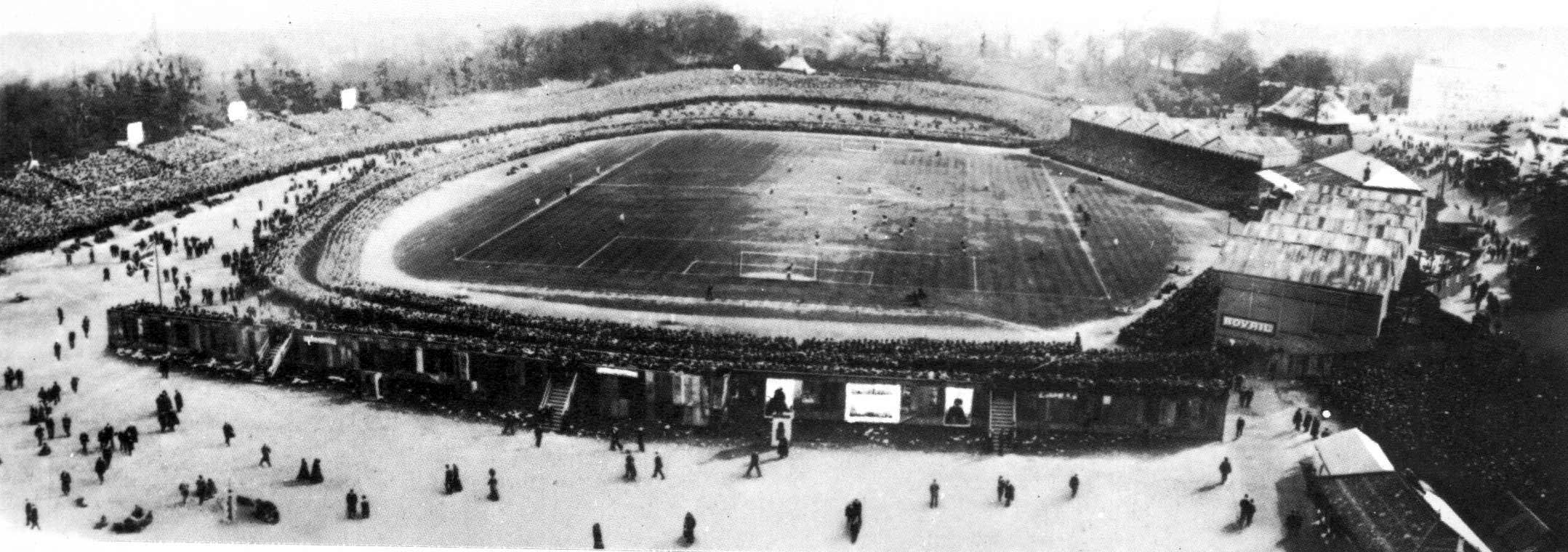
A panoramic view of the Crystal Palace ground during the 1905 FA Cup Final, the only such photograph of the stadium known to exist. The cricket pavilion is to the right.

The cricket ground at Crystal Palace was laid out in 1857 as part of the development of The Crystal Palace itself which had opened in 1854. A 3.2 hectares (7.9 acres) site was used and the ground became the home of Crystal Palace Cricket Club – prior to the development of the site the general location had been used as a ground by Sydenham Cricket Club. The club played at the ground until 1900 when they were wound up and its funds were distributed to local charities and Kent County Cricket Club.

The first recorded first-class cricket match on the ground was in 1864, when Kent County Cricket Club played Nottinghamshire. From 1869 to 1870, Kent played four further first-class matches at the ground, two in each season. The club has a tradition of playing cricket at grounds in what it terms "Metropolitan Kent". Grounds in nearby Beckenham, Blackheath, Catford and Dartford have all also been used by the club in the past for a total of more than 150 matches and the first match played by the county club after its foundation in 1842 was played at White Hart Field in Bromley.

Ten years passed before first-class cricket returned to Crystal Palace, when in 1880 the Players played the touring Australians at the ground. In 1888 an England XI played another touring Australian team and three further first-class matches took place on the ground from 1890 to 1900.

In 1898, the Crystal Palace Company formed London County Cricket Club after offering W.G. Grace the roles of the club's secretary, manager and captain. Grace accepted the offer and his 29-year association with Gloucestershire ended as a result of the conflicts between the new club and his county team. London County played their first first-class match at the ground in 1900 against Surrey. From 1900 to 1904 the team played 34 first-class matches at Crystal Palace, the last of which saw them play Warwickshire in August 1904. The increase in the importance of the County Championship, Grace's decline in form due to age and the lack of a competitive element in the matches led to a decline in attendances and meant that the team lost money, with the club winding up in 1908.

The Gentlemen of England used the ground for three first-class matches in 1905 against a touring Australian team, Oxford University and Cambridge University and in 1906 a WG Grace's XI played the touring West Indians and Cambridge University.

== Other Sports ==
The amateur Crystal Palace football club formed in 1861, used the cricket ground during its early years sharing it with the cricket club.

== Modern use ==
During World War I the ground and surrounding ornamental gardens were used as a training depot by the Royal Naval Volunteer Reserve. This largely destroyed the cricket pitch and after the war the original cricket field was used as tennis courts from 1921 and then for football pitches. The pavilion was demolished in 1960 and the site today forms part of the Crystal Palace National Sports Centre, which was built in 1964. Facilities include an athletics stadium, indoor arena, swimming pool and a range of other sports facilities.

A cricket ground was re-established on the site in the early 1990s. As of 2023 there are no cricket pitches in use in the park.

== Records on the ground ==
A total of 48 first-class cricket matches were held on the ground between 1864 and 1906. London County were the home team in 34 of these with Kent playing as the home team in five. The two teams never played each other at Crystal Palace.

- Highest total: 633 by London County against MCC, 1901
- Lowest total: 39 by CE de Trafford's XI against Australians, 1896
- Highest partnership: 281, 3rd wicket by WG Grace and L Walker, for London County against MCC, 1901
- Highest individual score: 224 not out, CCT Doll, for MCC against London County, 1901
- Best bowling in an innings: 9/55, CB Llewellyn, for London County against Cambridge University, 1902
- Best bowling in a match: 14/109, CB Llewellyn, for London County against Cambridge University, 1902
