= GLA Land and Property =

- Coat of arms of the Greater London Authority
- Abbreviation: GLAP
- Predecessor: London Development Agency
- Formation: 1 April 2012
- Founder: Localism Act 2011
- Type: Statutory corporation
- Legal status: Subsidiary company
- Headquarters: Windsor House
- Location: Westminster, Greater London
- Coordinates: 51.4978°N 0.1352°W
- Region served: London
- Field: Purchase, sale, rental and holding of land or property and development in London
- Official language: English
- Director (GLA Executive Director of Resources): Martin Clarke
- Director (GLA Executive Director Housing and Property): David Lunts
- Parent organisation: Greater London Authority

GLA Land and Property (GLAP) is a subsidiary company of the Greater London Authority, holding land and other property on behalf of the Greater London Authority, under the direction of the Mayor of London.

== Formation ==
The Localism Act 2011 required that the assets and liabilities of the LDA should be transferred to the Greater London Authority, and GLA Land and Property was established to take on that responsibility.

== Functions ==
It was formed on 1 April 2012 as a replacement for the London Development Agency (LDA) as an arm's length corporate body to take on the assets of the LDA and other agencies, under the direction of the Mayor of London. It is one of the largest public sector landowners in London and its primary aims are to create jobs and housing. GLAP is headquartered in Windsor House, Westminster in the offices used by Transport for London.

=== Land holdings ===
As of 2026, the company holds 635 hectares (1,570 acres; 2.45 sq mi) of land in Greater London. These land holdings transferred from the London Development Agency, London Thames Gateway Development Corporation (not including Queen Elizabeth Olympic Park) and the London part of the Homes and Communities Agency. The most significant single asset of GLAP is the Greenwich Peninsula a high proportion of the land is in East London. In addition to the land owned by GLAP, the Greater London Authority owns the considerable property portfolios of the London Fire Brigade, Metropolitan Police Service and Transport for London.

=== Schemes ===
GLAP has a goal of delivering 68,000 homes on its land by 2041.

== Governance ==
The steering board that makes decisions for GLAP contains the chief of staff to the Mayor of London, and the Deputy Mayor of London for Housing, Tom Copley.

GLAP is held by a holding company called Greater London Authority Holdings Limited, created at the same time. Greater London Authority Holdings Limited does not trade and has no other subsidiaries.

GLAP is not permitted to borrow directly from the Public Works Loan Board, but the Greater London Authority can borrow on its behalf. This was needed because GLAP inherited a borrowing requirement of approximately £300m from the LDA. The liabilities transferred from the LDA include the costs of the compulsory purchase of land for the 2012 Olympic and Paralympic games. It is anticipated this will be repaid from the sale of other assets.

GLAP has been criticised for not paying back loans.
