= Marsham Towers =

Towers in Westminster, UK

Coordinates: 51°29′45″N 0°07′48″W

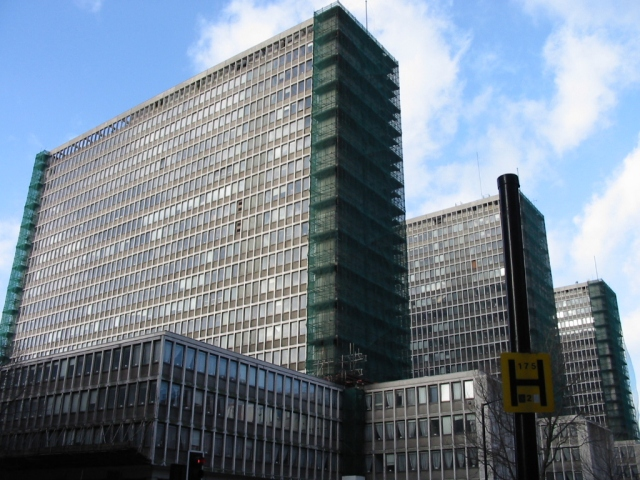
Marsham Towers, with netting to protect passers-by against pieces of falling concrete.

The Marsham Towers were three government buildings at the corner of Marsham Street and Great Peter Street in Westminster. They served as the headquarters of the Department of the Environment.

== Redevelopment ==
The redevelopment of the site was long planned. The site was originally a gas works and had first included two gas holders (built 1875), renovated in World War 2 for use as bomb shelter 'citadels'—the North Rotunda and the South Rotunda. A new 'steel-framed building' was also added in 1940 and 1941. Both rotundas were designed to survive the impact of a 500-pound bomb and had 12-foot-thick (3.7 m) concrete roofs. In 1943 the lowest level of the North Rotunda (codenamed Anson) was kitted out as the reserve to the Cabinet War Rooms. The previous reserve Paddock in Dollis Hill was seen to be unsatisfactory and too far from Whitehall.

By the early 1960s, the increasing numbers of civil servants led to the commissioning of Eric Bedford (1909–2001), chief architect for the Ministry of Public Building and Works, to design a headquarters building for three separate ministries, the Ministry of Housing and Local Government, the Ministry of Transport and the Ministry of Public Building and Works. His design, published in 1963, placed three twenty-storey slab blocks parallel north to south on top of a three-storey podium slab raised on stilts. Each tower had exposed concrete framing, being built in a new 'box-shell' system which mixed pre-cast concrete and on-site construction. They were 216.5 feet (66.0 m) tall. The towers incorporated the rotundas in the base and were completed in 1971.

The rotundas were used as a communications centre and a civil service sports club, amongst other things. By the time the towers were complete, the three separate ministries had merged into the Department of the Environment, and having separate towers proved inefficient. The bland frontage of the blocks, described in Nikolaus Pevsner's architectural guides as "the very image of faceless bureaucracy", was much criticised and local people nicknamed them "the three ugly sisters".

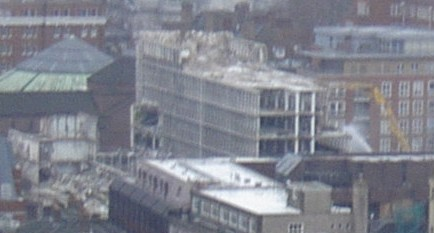
The northernmost tower undergoing demolition, 30 January 2003.

Michael Heseltine announced on 6 February 1992 that he proposed to knock the building down. In 1996, an architectural competition was held for a mixed-use replacement but did not produce a clear outcome. Eventually it was decided to build a replacement for the Home Office on the site and the towers were taken down in 2002/03. The site is now occupied by Sir Terry Farrell's new building at 2 Marsham Street, which the Home Office first occupied in February 2005 and a housing development containing just over 100 apartments called New Palace Place.
