= Crystal Palace Cricket Club =

London club from 1857 to 1990

Crystal Palace CC
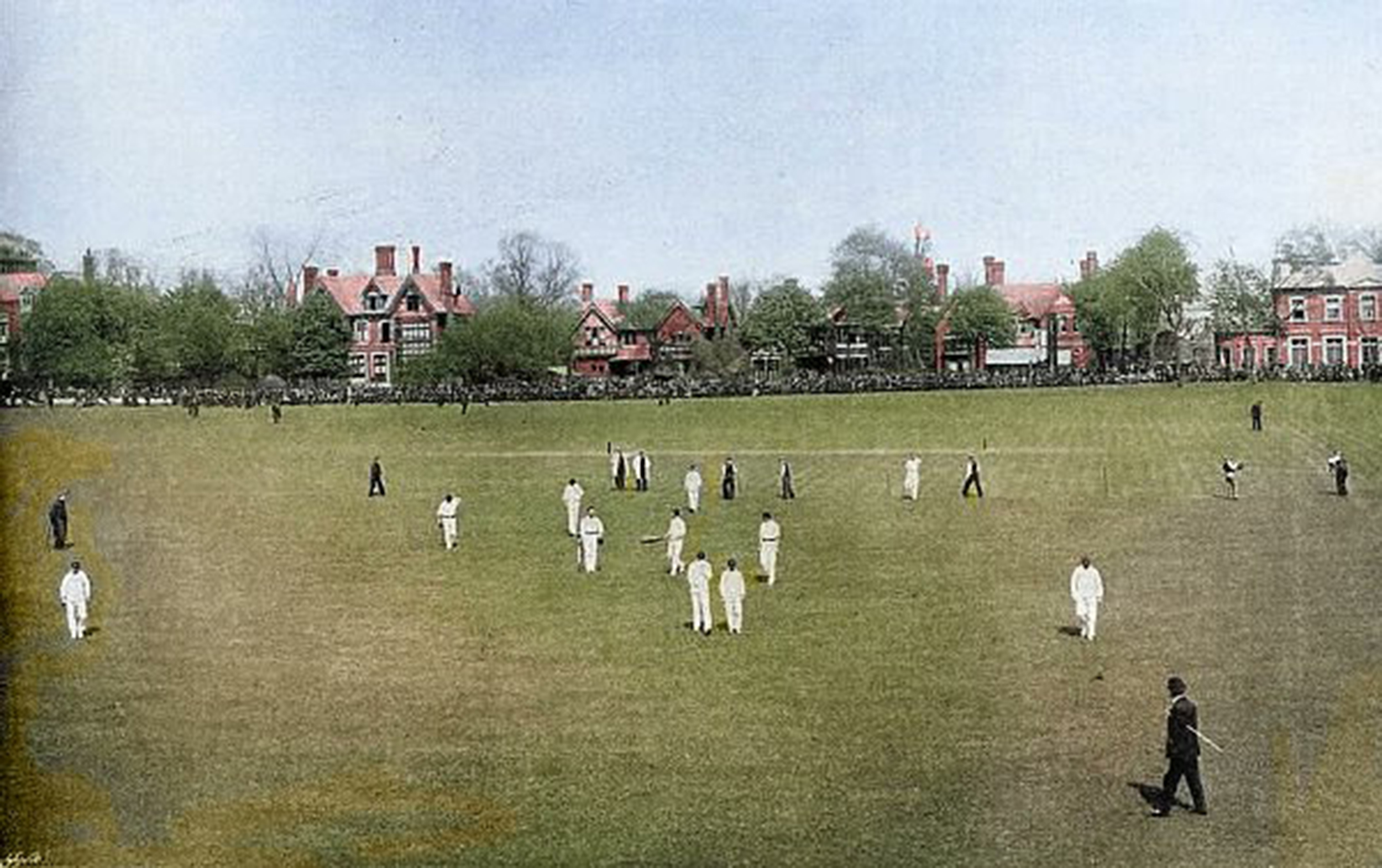
- Crystal Palace Park Cricket Ground in July 1899

Team information
- Founded: 1857
- Dissolved: 1900
- Home ground: Crystal Palace Park Cricket Ground

Crystal Palace Cricket Club was an amateur cricket team based in south London, active during the Victorian era. The club played matches at Crystal Palace Park and was part of the broader sporting culture that developed around the Crystal Palace exhibition grounds. Though now defunct, it represents a slice of London's 19th-century cricket heritage.

== History ==
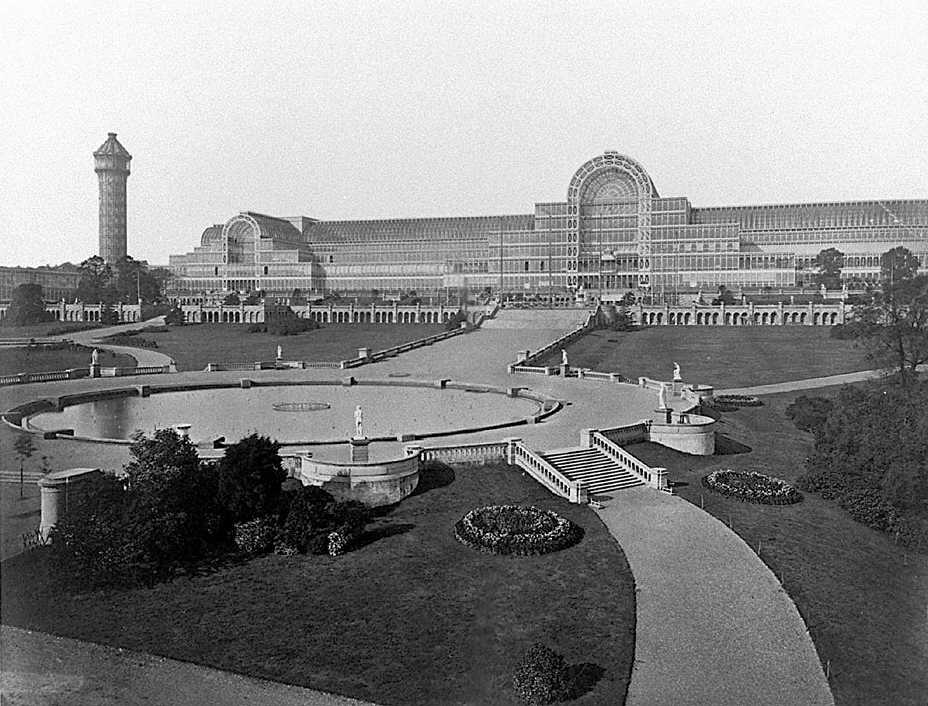
The Crystal Palace at Sydenham, South London

In June 1854, the vast glass building known as the Crystal Palace was re-constructed at the top of Sydenham Hill in south east London. Designed by Joseph Paxton, it resembled in part the building used to host the Great Exhibition in Hyde Park, London three years earlier. The Crystal Palace Company sought to supplement the attraction of the building itself by developing a 200 acre park on the site offering a diverse range of entertainment and leisure facilities.

In April 1857, the Company announced that a new cricket ground had been completed on the park grounds, between the Sydenham entrance and the Grand Central Walk. It stated the ground will become a source of revenue and Tom Sherman would manage it.

The Crystal Palace Cricket Club was formed in the summer of 1857. The cricket ground was leased as their home venue, which proved an added attraction to people visiting the park.

CPCC was an independent self-managed club, run by a committee of members electing its officers at AGMs. The club colours were black, red and lavender.

On 13 July 1857, the club played a match against Guy's Hospital. On 19 August, there was a fixture between Twenty-two of Sydenham v Crystal Palace United Eleven.

CPCC members wanted to continue sporting activities during the winter months, which resulted in the formation of the first Crystal Palace football club in 1861.

Players paid annual subscriptions and the club raised extra funds in 1869 by sub-letting the ground for a charge of up to 18 guineas.

The club also hosted leading clubs in the area and also had fixtures against the M.C.C. and Ground, I Zingari and Surrey Club and Ground. The club's players undertook tours to South West England, Hampshire, Sussex and Kent.

In their final season of 1899, they played 39 matches, of which they won 12, drew 14 and lost 13. The last known recorded match was at home to Belgrave on 9 September 1899, with Palace's W.G. Grace Jnr scoring 18 and C.B. Grace scoring 9.

== Ground ==
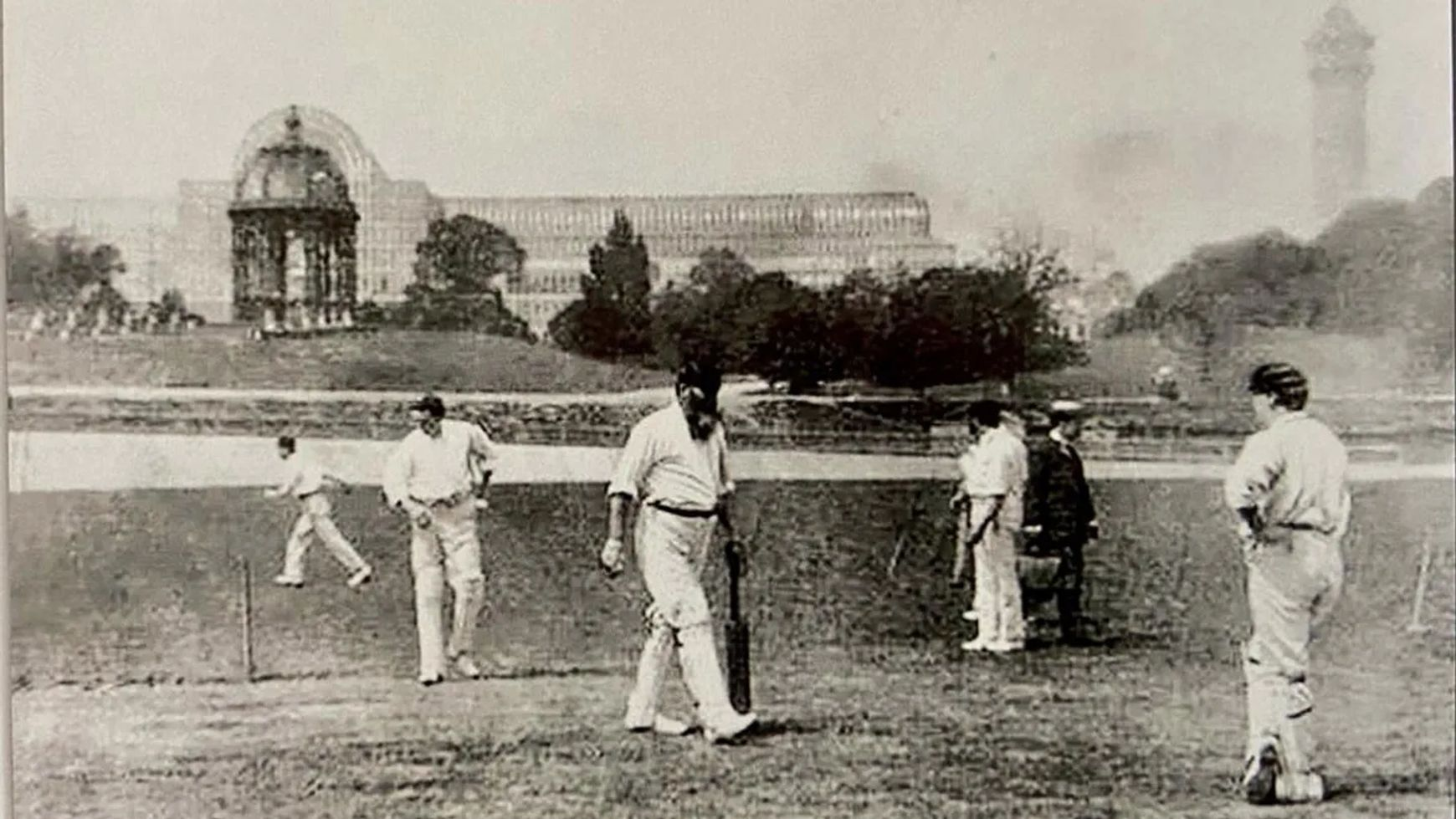
W.G. Grace at the Crystal Palace, 1899

Cricket had been played at the Crystal Palace on 17 June 1852 with a match between West Kent and Sydenham.

The Crystal Palace Park Cricket Ground opened in 1857. It was situated on the eastern side of the park and was let to Crystal Palace Cricket Club. The grounds were open for practice to annual subscribers of one guinea, or to daily practice at one shilling for each player. The first Crystal Palace football club, formed in 1861, played matches on the cricket field before it disbanded.

In 1864 the costs of draining and relaying a portion of the ground were split between the club and the Crystal Palace Company.

In 1865, the Crystal Palace Company built a cricket pavilion on the south side of the ground at a cost of £664 15s 9d. Marquees were still used for changing in big matches as well as for luncheons and refreshments.

The first county match staged at the Crystal Palace was in July 1864 when Kent CCC hosted Notts CCC. In June 1869, Kent entertained Surrey and then Sussex CC in July.

In 1880, Crystal Palace CC hosted two overseas touring teams. In June, their game with the Canadians finished in a draw. A month later, the club received a visit from the second Australia CC team to tour England and the tourists won by 10 wickets. In September, Australia returned to the ground to meet the Players of England.

In August 1888, the Australians visited Crystal Palace, and playing under the name of the Colonials, lost to an Eleven of England. In May 1896, Australia came back to the ground to face Mr CE de Trafford’s XI.

== Notable players ==
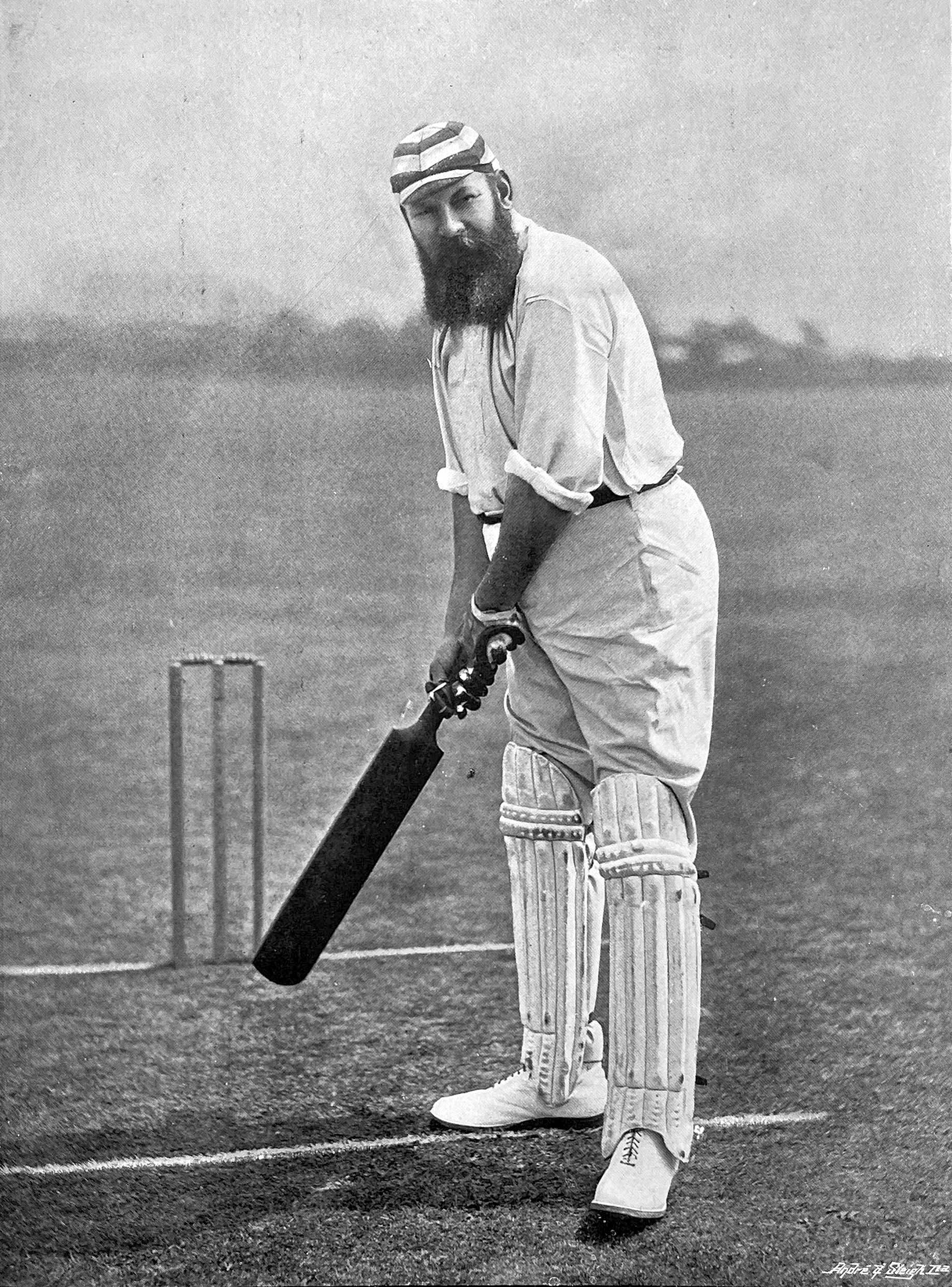
W.G. Grace

- Ian Campbell (Middlesex CCC) – claimed to have bowled WG Grace twice
- Charles Chenery (Surrey CCC, Northamptonshire CCC) – the only footballer to play in England’s first three internationals, Chenery played 13 first-class matches for Surrey and later played for Northants before the county became a first-class side
- Stanley Colman (Surrey CCC) – a relative of Jeremiah Colman, the mustard magnate
- Arthur Daffen (Kent CCC) – played 16 first-class matches for the county
- Ted Dillon (Kent CCC) – captained Kent to three County Championship victories and played rugby union for England and Blackheath F.C.
- Charles Fox (Kent CCC, Surrey CCC) – appeared for the Gentlemen of England and the South of England, but made most of his first-class appearances for Kent
- W. G. Grace (Gloucestershire CCC) – played at least twice for Crystal Palace and scored 81 against Beckenham
- Digby Jephson (Surrey CCC) – played more than 200 first-class matches for Surrey and was one of the last lob bowlers
- Clement Mitchell (Kent CCC) – won five caps for the England football team, scoring five goals, and played eight times for Kent
- Lionel Wells (Middlesex CCC) – brother of CM Wells; also appeared for London County CC
- Livingstone Walker (Surrey CCC) – nicknamed ‘Livy’, Walker captained Surrey

== Decline and disbanding ==
When the Crystal Palace Company founded the London County Cricket Club in January 1899, a compromise had to be organised to share the ground. The Company needed to reach an agreement with Crystal Palace Cricket Club regarding the use of ground as the club had a lease which continued until 1900.

The ground sharing arrangement failed, given that the Crystal Palace Cricket Club decided to fold.

At a meeting of its members in 1900, it was decided to wind up the club’s affairs. Of the remaining assets of £150, £100 went to the Kent County Cricket Club to be invested for the benefit of any former professional in need. And £25 each to the Home for Sick Children at Sydenham and the Norwood Cottage Hospital. A vote of thanks was passed to the Crystal Palace Company for allowing the club meetings in their rooms for many years past.

In 1908, former players attempted to resurrect the club but the Crystal Palace Company was against the idea.
