= Dulwich Paragon Cycling Club =

Dulwich Paragon Cycling Club is a cycling club in south-east London. The club was founded in 1935, originally under the name Village Wheelers, before adopting the Dulwich Paragon name later the same year. The club has grown to more than 500 members and is active in road racing, cyclo-cross, track racing, time trails, sportives and Audax events.

Logo of Dulwich Paragon Cycling Club

== History ==
The club was established during a period of growing interest in cycling in Britain with early members riding from Dulwich into Kent and Surrey. During the late 1930s the club grew steadily, organising weekend club runs, social gatherings and early time trail events. Members also began racing at Herne Hill Velodrome, where riders such as Wally Gimber competed regularly. Club activity was disrupted during the Second World War, with many members involved in the conflict, but racing and club life resumed in the post-war years.

By the mid-20th century Dulwich Paragon riders were active in time trails and mass start road racing, including events at Crystal Palace and other London Circuits. The club continued to expand its racing programme, promoting events such as the Wally Gimber road race, which later went on to become a National B level competition.

== Current activities ==
In the modern era the club has grown significantly, with a reported over 500 members. Members have achieved notable results, including Caroline Reuter's National Trophy cyclo-cross victory, the late Jonathan Gales' win at the National B Tour of the Hopfields, and Alex Brook-Turner's national titles in handcycling.

Dulwich Paragon Cycling Club promotes several major events in south-east England, including the long-standing Crystal Palace Crits series and the Wally Gimber Trophy road race.

== Colours ==
Club colours are blue, gold and red.

This combination has been used by the club since the late 20th century. According to an interview with the club's communication secretary, the origins of the blue and gold palette are not recorded, though members recall that the addition of red in the 1980s once led to Bernard Hinault mistaking the team for Belgian riders. The current kit design was created by club member Dave Rees and is produced by Nopinz.
