= Secretary of State for the Environment =

Former UK cabinet position

Department of the Environment
Department overview
- Formed: 15 October 1970
- Preceding agencies: Ministry of Public Building and Works; Ministry of Transport; Ministry of Housing and Local Government
- Dissolved: 2 May 1997
- Superseding Department: Secretary of State for the Environment, Transport and the Regions
- Jurisdiction: United Kingdom
- Headquarters: London, England, UK

The secretary of state for the environment was a UK cabinet position, responsible for the Department of the Environment (DoE). Today, its responsibilities are carried out by the secretary of state for environment, food and rural affairs and the secretary of state for housing, communities and local government. The post was created by Edward Heath as a combination of the Ministry of Housing and Local Government, the Ministry of Transport and the Ministry of Public Building and Works on 15 October 1970. Thus it managed a mixed portfolio of issues: housing and planning, local government, public buildings, environmental protection and, initially, transport – James Callaghan gave transport its department again in 1976. It has been asserted that during the Thatcher government the DoE led the drive towards centralism, and the undermining of local government. Particularly, the concept of 'inner cities policy', often involving centrally negotiated public-private partnerships and centrally appointed development corporations, which moved control of many urban areas to the centre, and away from their, often left-wing, local authorities. The department was based in Marsham Towers, three separate tower blocks built for the separate pre-merger ministries, in Westminster.

In 1997, when Labour came to power, the DoE was merged with the Department of Transport to form the Department of the Environment, Transport and the Regions (DETR), thus, essentially, restoring the DoE to its initial 1970 portfolio. The titular mention of 'the Regions' referred to the government's pledge to create a regional government. In the wake of the 2001 foot and mouth crisis, the environmental protection elements of the DETR were split of and merged with the Ministry of Agriculture, Fisheries and Food (MAFF), to form the Department for Environment, Food and Rural Affairs (Defra). Meanwhile, the transport, housing and planning, and local and regional government aspects went to a new Department for Transport, Local Government and the Regions (DTLR). A year later the DTLR also split, with transport getting its own department and the rest going to the Office of the Deputy Prime Minister.

== List of environment secretaries ==
Secretary of State for the Environment
Portrait	Name (Birth–Death)	Term of office		Party	Ministry
	Peter Walker; MP for Worcester (1932–2010)	15 October 1970	5 November 1972	Conservative	Heath
	Geoffrey Rippon; MP for Hexham (1924–1997)	5 November 1972	4 March 1974	Conservative	Heath
	Anthony Crosland; MP for Great Grimsby (1918–1977)	5 March 1974	8 April 1976	Labour	Wilson (III & IV)
	Peter Shore; MP for Stepney and Poplar (1924–2001)	8 April 1976	4 May 1979	Labour	Callaghan
	Michael Heseltine; MP for Henley (born 1933)	5 May 1979	6 January 1983	Conservative	Thatcher I
	Tom King; MP for Bridgwater (born 1933)	6 January 1983	11 June 1983	Conservative	Thatcher I
	Patrick Jenkin; MP for Wanstead and Woodford (1926–2016)	11 June 1983	2 September 1985	Conservative	Thatcher II
	Kenneth Baker; MP for Mole Valley (born 1934)	2 September 1985	21 May 1986	Conservative	Thatcher II
	Nicholas Ridley; MP for Cirencester and Tewkesbury (1929–1993)	21 May 1986	24 July 1989	Conservative	Thatcher II
	Nicholas Ridley; MP for Cirencester and Tewkesbury (1929–1993)	21 May 1986	24 July 1989	Conservative	Thatcher III
	Chris Patten; MP for Bath (born 1944)	24 July 1989	28 November 1990	Conservative	Thatcher III
	Michael Heseltine; MP for Henley (born 1933)	28 November 1990	11 April 1992	Conservative	Major I
	Michael Howard; MP for Folkestone and Hythe (born 1941)	11 April 1992	27 May 1993	Conservative	Major II
	John Gummer; MP for Suffolk Coastal (born 1939)	27 May 1993	2 May 1997	Conservative	Major II
