= Livingstone Walker =

English cricketer

Personal information
- Full name: Livingstone Walker
- Born: 14 June 1879; Urmston, Lancashire
- Died: 10 October 1940 (aged 61); Tonbridge, Kent
- Batting: Right-handed
- Bowling: Right-arm off-break
- Role: Occasional wicket-keeper

Domestic team information
- Years: Team
- 1900–1903: Surrey
- 1900–1904: London County
- FC debut: 14 May 1900 London County v Worcestershire
- Last FC: 24 June 1904 London County v South Africans

Career statistics
Competition	First-class
Matches	94
Runs scored	3,061
Batting average	23.01
100s/50s	2/11
Top score	222
Balls bowled	1,577
Wickets	19
Bowling average	47.94
5 wickets in innings	0
10 wickets in match	0
Best bowling	4/41
Catches/stumpings	56/1
- Source: CricketArchive, 30 April 2008

Livingstone Walker (14 June 1879 – 10 October 1940) was an English amateur cricketer. His first-class career lasted from 1900 to 1904. He was a middle-order batsman, an occasional off spin bowler, and a very occasional wicket-keeper. He captained Surrey in 1903.

A good club cricketer, he was invited to play in some matches for London County in 1900. Though he was not very successful, he was selected to play in two matches for Surrey at the end of the season.

The following season was his most successful with the bat. He played in 24 matches: 9 for London County and 15 for Surrey. He reached 1,000 runs in a season for the only time, with 1,180 at a respectable average of 31.89. He made his only two hundreds that season, both for London County. His highest score of 222 was scored against Marylebone Cricket Club (MCC), when he shared a partnership of 281 with WG Grace for the third wicket. His innings took only 260 minutes.

Though he was less successful in 1902, with only 459 runs at an average of 20.86, before the start of the 1903 season he was appointed the Surrey captain following the resignation from the post of Digby Jephson. In those days, the convention was that the captain had to be an amateur, and Surrey were unable to find one willing to do the job who had greater experience or who was a stronger player. The side finished eleventh out of fifteen. In 1904, he played in only six matches, all for London County.

He was popular with his fellow players, and he acquired the nickname of Livy. His English cricket career was terminated by his moving to Shanghai, where he played for the Shanghai cricket team in matches against Hong Kong.
