= Windsor House, London =

Office building in London, England

Coordinates: 51.4978°N 0.1352°W

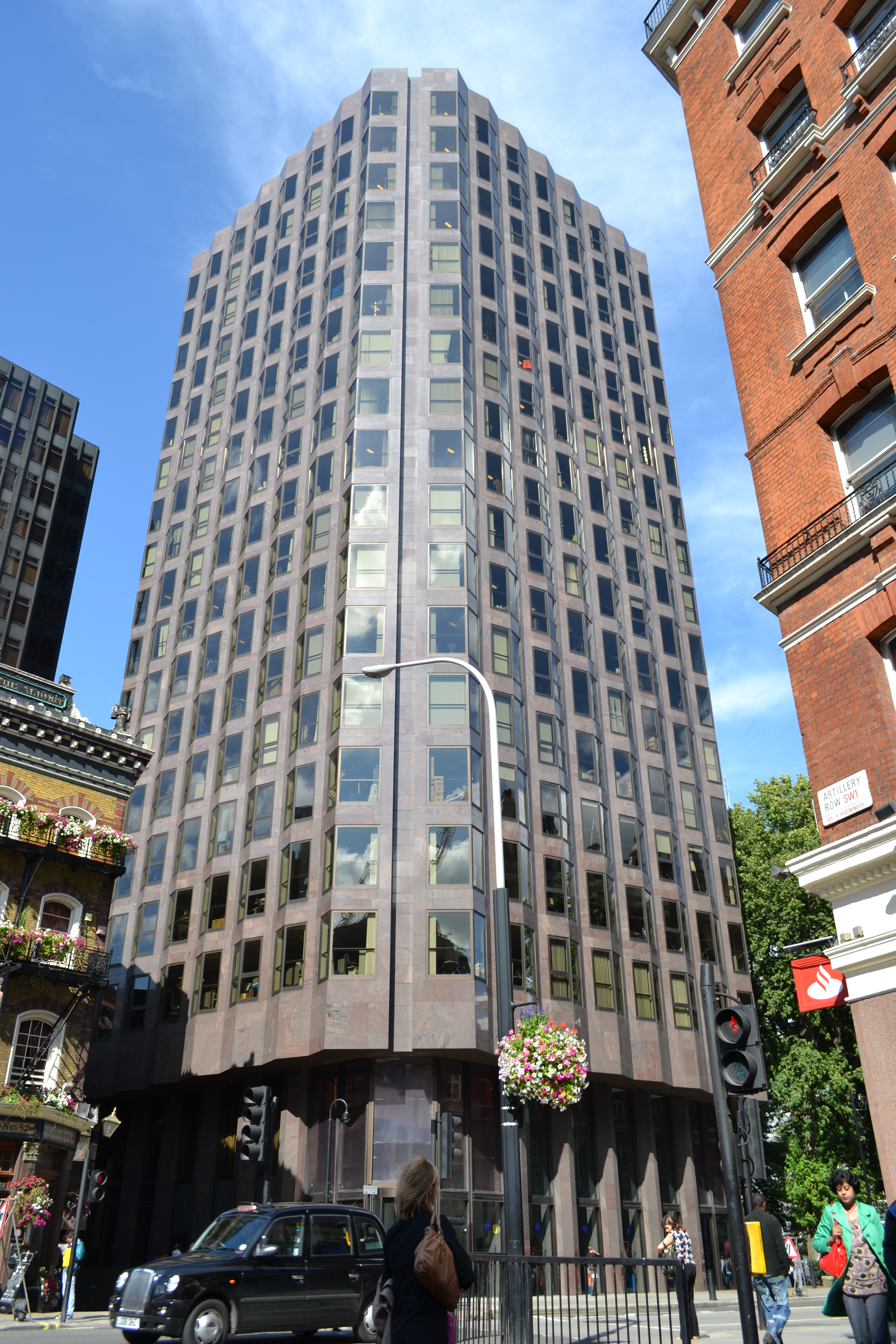
Windsor House

Windsor House is an office building in Victoria Street, City of Westminster, London, England. It was built in 1973 by R. Seifert & Partners,

The building replaced an older Victorian building, Windsor House (the Windsor Hotel, formerly the Army and Navy Hotel), which had been built in 1888 by Frederick Thomas Pilkington.

The 1970s complex consists of an eighteen-storey tower, a two-storey block (Butler Place) and residential accommodation (Christchurch House) above an underground car park and basement. The purple granite and glass facade of the main structure stands 70 m (230 ft). Butler Place houses Lloyds TSB at ground level.

The eighteen-storey tower was previously occupied solely by staff from Transport for London but they have since left the building. In January 2018, the Government Property Agency acquired the building. The Homes and Communities Agency took over two floors in March 2018, relocating from the Home Office building at 2 Marsham Street, SW1.

The top four floors, formerly occupied by Department for International Trade (starting in 2018) have been occupied by the London-headquartered merchant services fintech company SaltPay, since October 2022.
