= London Development Agency =

- Successor: GLA Land and Property
- Formation: 1999
- Dissolved: 2012
- Legal status: Regional development agency
- Headquarters: Palestra, Southwark
- Region served: Greater London
- Leadership: Appointed board
- Budget: £410.627 million (2007/08)
- Website: http://www.lda.gov.uk/
- Remarks: Appointment: Mayor of London

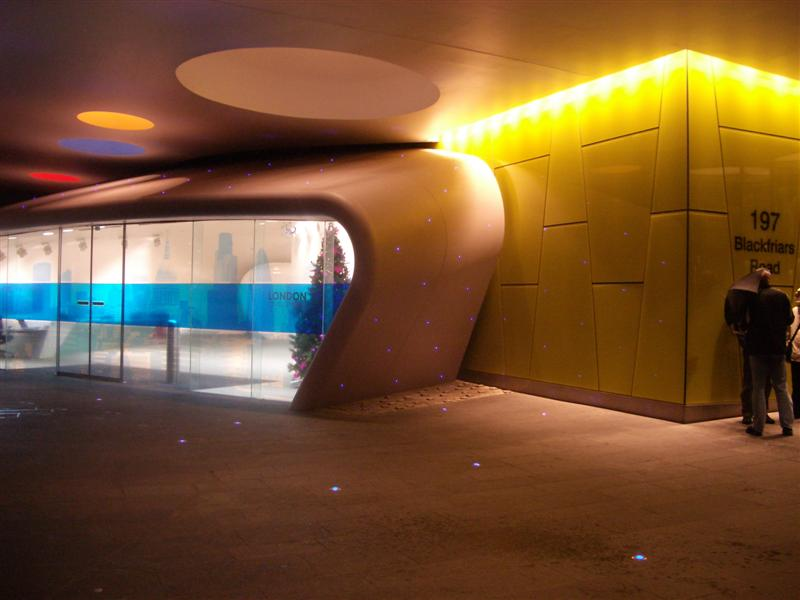
LDA entrance in Palestra House, designed by Will Alsop and Buro Happold

The London Development Agency (LDA) was the regional development agency for the London region in England from July 2000 until 31 March 2012.

== History ==
The LDA was established as a functional body of the Greater London Authority in July 2000.

As mayor, in 2008, Boris Johnson commissioned a forensic audit of the London Development Agency which recommended that it should only commission projects rather than develop projects directly. In 2010, Boris Johnson announced that he would seek the transfer of the functions of the LDA to the GLA.

The agency was closed on 31 March 2012 as a result of the coalition government's 2010 spending review. The Localism Act 2011 abolished the LDA. A subsidiary of the GLA, GLA Land and Property, was formed to take on the LDA's assets and liabilities.

== Remit ==
The remit of the LDA was to work in partnership with local authorities, voluntary groups, training institutions, businesses and regeneration partnerships.

The LDA was responsible for the compulsory purchase, the clearing of land and the establishment of relocation strategies. One project the LDA did this for was the Queen Elizabeth Olympic Park.

== Headquarters ==
From its establishment until 2006, the LDA was based at 58-60 Devon House, St Katharine's Way, Tower Hamlets. From 2006 until its abolition, the LDA was based at Palestra, 197 Blackfriars Road, Southwark.

== Chief executive ==
- Michael Ward (2000–2004)
- Manny Lewis (2004–2008)
- Peter Rogers (2008–2012)
