= List of London County Cricket Club players =

This is a list of cricketers who represented London County Cricket Club when it was officially designated a first-class team from 1900 to 1904. The details are the player's usual name followed by his name as it would appear on modern match scorecards (usually his surname preceded by all initials). As London County was a short-lived venture, nearly all of its players represented other first-class teams, and most of them are better known for their careers with other county clubs.

== A ==
- Ted Arnold : E. G. Arnold
- Alfred Atfield : A. J. Atfield

== B ==
- Ernest Bale : E. W. Bale
- Ernest Beldam : E. A. Beldam
- George Beldam : G. W. Beldam
- Richard Bell : R. M. Bell
- Edward Berridge : E. H. S. Berridge
- Gordon Black : G. G. Black
- Jack Board : J. H. Board
- Francis Bohlen : F. H. Bohlen
- Hugh Bompas : H. S. Bompas
- Bill Bradley : W. M. Bradley
- Len Braund : L. C. Braund
- Walter Brearley : W. Brearley
- Thomas Brewer : T. T. Brewer
- Bill Brockwell : W. Brockwell
- Richard Brooks : R. Brooks
- Stanley Brown : W. S. A. Brown
- Cuthbert Burnup : C. J. Burnup
- Henry Burton : H. H. Burton

== C ==
- Ian Campbell : I. M. Campbell
- Samuel Coe : S. Coe
- Henry Colegrave : H. M. Colegrave
- E. Cox : E. Cox (1900)
- Beaumont Cranfield : B. Cranfield

== D ==
- William Davis : W. E. Davis
- Leonidas de Montezuma : L. D. M. de Montezuma
- Charles de Trafford : C. E. de Trafford
- Ted Dillon : E. W. Dillon
- Johnny Douglas : J. W. H. T. Douglas
- Thomas Drew : T. M. Drew
- William Dyas : W. G. Dyas

== F ==
- Frederick Fane : F. L. Fane
- Frank Field : E. F. Field
- Tom Fishwick : T. S. Fishwick
- Frederick Fleming : F. Fleming
- Edgar Ford : E. S. Ford
- Edward French : E. L. French
- William Frith : W. F. L. Frith
- C. B. Fry : C. B. Fry

== G ==
- Percival Gale : P. G. Gale
- George Gamble : G. F. Gamble
- George Gill : G. C. Gill
- James Gilman : J. Gilman
- Kenneth Goldie : K. O. Goldie
- Charles Grace : C. B. Grace
- W. G. Grace : W. G. Grace
- W. G. Grace junior : W. G. Grace junior
- Weir Greenlees : W. L. G. Greenlees
- John Gunn : J. R. Gunn

== H ==
- Ernest Halliwell : E. A. Halliwell
- James Hampson : J. F. Hampson
- Stanley Harris : S. S. Harris
- Nigel Harrison : N. S. A. Harrison
- Maitland Hathorn : C. M. H. Hathorn
- Ernie Hayes : E. G. Hayes
- Hesketh Hesketh-Prichard : H. V. Hesketh-Prichard
- Reginald Heygate : R. B. Heygate
- John Hirsch : J. G. Hirsch
- Beresford Horsley : A. B. Horsley
- Fred Huish : F. H. Huish

== J ==
- Lionel Jackson : L. Jackson
- Bangalore Jayaram : B. Jayaram
- Gilbert Jessop : G. L. Jessop
- Arthur Jones : A. O. Jones

== K ==
- Herbert Keigwin : H. S. Keigwin
- Richard Kenward : R. Kenward
- Alexander Kermode : A. Kermode
- Albert Knight : A. E. Knight
- Johannes Kotze : J. J. Kotze

== L ==
- Bob Lambert : R. J. H. Lambert
- Albert Lawton : A. E. Lawton
- Walter Lees : W. S. Lees
- Dick Lilley : A. F. A. Lilley
- Charlie Llewellyn : C. B. Llewellyn

== M ==
- Archie MacLaren : A. C. MacLaren
- Percy May : P. R. May
- Charlie McGahey : C. P. McGahey
- Walter Mead : W. Mead
- Frank Mitchell : F. Mitchell
- Sir Cecil Moon, 2nd Baronet : C. E. Moon
- John Moulder : J. H. Moulder
- Bill Murch : W. H. Murch
- Billy Murdoch : W. L. Murdoch

== N ==
- Thomas Nicholson : T. B. Nicholson
- Newman Norman : N. F. Norman

== O ==
- Thomas Oates : T. W. Oates
- William Odell : W. W. Odell

== P ==
- Howard Parkes : H. R. Parkes
- Percy Perrin : P. A. Perrin
- Arthur Pickering : A. Pickering
- Les Poidevin : L. O. S. Poidevin
- Carst Posthuma : C. J. Posthuma
- Rowland Powell-Williams : R. Powell-Williams
- Charles Prince : C. F. H. Prince

== Q ==
- Willie Quaife : W. G. Quaife

== R ==
- Ranjitsinhji : K. S. Ranjitsinhji
- John Raphael : J. E. Raphael
- Dan Reese : D. Reese
- Albert Relf : A. E. Relf
- Charles Richards : C. H. Richards
- Tom Richardson : T. Richardson
- Foster Robinson : F. G. Robinson
- Charles Robson : C. Robson
- Ernie Robson : E. Robson

== S ==
- Sydney Santall : S. Santall
- E. H. D. Sewell : E. H. D. Sewell
- James Seymour : J. Seymour
- William Shalders : W. A. Shalders
- Jimmy Sinclair : J. H. Sinclair
- Arthur Sladen : A. R. Sladen
- Frank Smith : F. E. Smith
- Razor Smith : W. C. Smith
- William Smith : W. Smith
- Arthur Somerset senior : A. W. F. Somerset
- Fred Stedman : F. Stedman
- Bill Storer : W. Storer
- Pascoe Stuart : P. W. G. Stuart

== T ==
- Louis Tancred : L. J. Tancred
- Theodore Tapp : T. A. Tapp
- Christian Tindall : C. Tindall
- Sidney Tindall : S. M. Tindall
- James Todd : J. H. Todd
- Charlie Townsend : C. L. Townsend
- Albert Trott : A. E. Trott

== V ==
- Joe Vine : J. Vine
- Richard Voss : R. Z. H. Voss

== W ==
- Livingstone Walker : L. Walker
- Benjamin Wallach : B. Wallach
- Lionel Wells : L. S. Wells
- David Williams : D. P. Williams
- Cecil Wood : C. J. B. Wood
- Arthur Woodcock : A. Woodcock
- Harry Wrathall : H. Wrathall
