= Horsley (surname) =

Horsley is a surname. Notable people with the surname include:

- Alec Horsley of Hull, founder of Northern Foods
- Beresford Horsley (1880–1923), English cricketer and businessman
- Charles Edward Horsley (1822–1876), English composer
- Cuthbert Horsley, English MP in the sixteenth century
- David Horsley (1873–1933), Anglo-American pioneer of the motion picture industry
- George Horsley (1836–1895), English ship owner, alderman and mayor of Hartlepool
- Gilbert Horsley (fl. 1570s), English privateer
- Jean Horsley (1913–1997), New Zealand artist
- John Horsley (disambiguation), multiple people
- Lee Horsley, (born 1955), American actor
- Matt Horsley (born 1972), Australian footballer
- Matthew Henry Horsley (1867-1925), English timber merchant, ship owner, mayor of Hartlepool and philatelist
- Neal Horsley (1944–2015), American political figure of the far right
- Sir Peter Horsley (1921–2001), Air Marshal of the Royal Air Force, Equerry to the Duke of Edinburgh and Ufologist
- Richard A. Horsley (born 1939), American theologist and philologist
- Ron Horsley (born 1977), American author and artist
- Rupert Horsley (1905-1988), English First Class Cricketer
- Samuel Horsley (1733–1806), British churchman and bishop of Rochester
- Sebastian Horsley (1962–2010), English writer and artist
- Valerie Horsley, American developmental biologist
- Victor Horsley (1857–1916), English neurosurgeon and scientist
- William Horsley (1774–1858), English organist and composer
