= George Gaukrodger =

English cricketer

Cricket information
- Batting: Right-handed

Career statistics
| Competition | First-class |
|---|---|
| Matches | 115 |
| Runs scored | 2,241 |
| Batting average | 16.84 |
| 100s/50s | 0/7 |
| Top score | 91 |
| Catches/stumpings | 168/63 |
- Source: Cricinfo, 7 November 2022

George Gaukrodger (11 September 1877 – 4 January 1938) was a first-class cricketer who played as a wicket-keeper. He made more than 100 appearances for Worcestershire between 1900 and 1910; he also played once for the Players against the touring Australians in 1902.

Born in Ireland and hailing from an Irish family, Irish born Gaukrodger qualified for Worcestershire and made his first-class debut against London County in May 1900, his first dismissal being the stumping of tail-ender Lionel Wells. He played a further two matches that season, and another two the following year, but it was not until 1902 that he established himself in the Worcestershire side, replacing Thomas Straw as regular wicket-keeper.

In that 1902 season, Gaukrodger played 24 times, including the aforementioned game for the Players at Harrogate; he failed twice with the bat, but pulled off two stumpings. In total he made 48 dismissals, a tally which was to remain his best, and nor did he ever surpass the 666 first-class runs he hit that year, which included 58 against the Australians at New Road.

He enjoyed another good season with the bat in 1903, once more passing 500 runs and hitting his highest first-class score when he made 91 against Lancashire in June, putting on 167 with HK Foster to drag Worcestershire from the depths of 32/4. With the exception of last man Robert Burrows (18), Gaukrodger and Foster were the only batsmen to reach double figures in the first innings. His 37 dismissals in 1903 also contributed to a satisfactory summer.

Never again did Gaukrodger play more than 13 times in a season, being gradually superseded by Bale. However the best summer of his later years was 1907, when he took 26 catches and made 13 stumpings. His batting, however, fell away. In 1906 he managed only 82 runs from 21 innings with an average below 6. One score of exactly 50 in 1904 proved to be his last half-century, although he did score an unbeaten 45 against Kent in 1908.

Gaukrodger's last first-class appearance of all was also his only match of the 1910 season, against Lancashire at Worcester, making 0 not out and capturing three dismissals. He did not appear at this level again, giving up his position completely to Ernest Bale.

He umpired one first-class match, standing with George Bromhead at Worcestershire's game against the Philadelphians in July 1908 though he officiated in Club and Ground fixtures..

A gifted sportsman, Gaukrodger played football at the international level, appearing for Ireland against Wales in March 1895. He was not yet eighteen but earned his selection as a prolific goal scorer after success in the Irish league for the Belfast side Linfield.
