= Harry Burton =

Harry Burton may refer to:

- Harry Burton (Egyptologist) (1879–1940), English Egyptologist and archaeological photographer
- Harry Burton (journalist) (1968–2001), Australian journalist and cameraman
- Harry Burton (rugby league) (?–2009), rugby league footballer of the 1950s for Wakefield Trinity
- Harry Burton (RAF officer) (1919–1993)
- Harry Burton (English footballer) (1881/2–1923), footballer for Sheffield Wednesday, West Brom and Scunthorpe United
- Harry Burton (Australian footballer) (1887–1972), Australian rules footballer
- Harry Burton (actor), British actor and director; son of Humphrey Burton; professional stage name of Matthew Burton

== See also ==
- Harold Burton (disambiguation)
- Henry Burton (disambiguation)
