= Clifford Wells (cricketer) =

English cricketer, rugby union player, and educator

Personal information
- Full name: Clifford Wells
- Born: 17 October 1872; St Pancras, London, England
- Died: 27 February 1952 (aged 79); Crowthorne, Berkshire, England
- Batting: Unknown
- Bowling: Unknown
- Relatives: Cyril Wells (brother); Lionel Wells (brother)

Domestic team information
- Years: Team
- 1894: Cambridge University

Career statistics
Competition	First-class
Matches	1
Runs scored	24
Batting average	12.00
100s/50s	–/–
Top score	24
Balls bowled	85
Wickets	0
Bowling average	–
5 wickets in innings	–
10 wickets in match	–
Best bowling	–
Catches/stumpings	1/–
- Source: Cricinfo, 17 January 2022

Clifford Wells (17 October 1872 – 27 February 1952) was an English first-class cricketer, rugby union player, and educator.

The son of William Lewis Wells, he was born at St Pancras. He was educated at Dulwich College, before matriculating to Jesus College, Cambridge. Clifford was an active sportsman while at Cambridge, playing first-class cricket for Cambridge University Cricket Club in a single match against the Marylebone Cricket Club at Lord's in 1894. He went wicketless in the match and scored 24 runs with the bat. Although he did not progress any further with his cricket after graduating from Cambridge, he did play rugby union for Sussex and Surrey, in addition to playing for the Barbarians. By profession he was a teacher, being employed as an assistant master at Wellington College from 1898 to 1927. Wells, who was married twice during his life, died at his residence at Crowthorne in February 1952. His brothers', Cyril and Lionel, were also first-class cricketers.
