= Horsley =

Horsley may refer to:

- Horsley (surname), a surname
- Hawker Horsley, a 1920s bomber aircraft produced by Hawker Aircraft

== Places in Australia ==
- Horsley, New South Wales, a suburb in Wollongong, New South Wales
- Horsley Park, New South Wales, a suburb of Sydney, New South Wales

== Places in the United Kingdom ==
- Horsley, Derbyshire, a village north of Derby, England
- Horsley, Gloucestershire, a hamlet and civil parish in Gloucestershire, England
- Horsley, Northumberland, a village and civil parish near Prudhoe, England
- Horsley, Rochester, a location in Northumberland, England
- Horsley Cross, a hamlet in Essex, England
- Horsleycross Street, a hamlet in Essex, England
- Horsley railway station, a railway station in East Horsley, Surrey, England
- Horsley Hall, Gresford, a former house in Wrexham County Borough, Wales
- East Horsley, a village in Surrey, England
- West Horsley, a village in Surrey, England
