= Gordon Black =

Gordon Black may refer to:

- Gordon Black (footballer)
- Gordon Black (cricketer)
- Gordon Black (swimmer)
