= Henry Burton =

Henry Burton may refer to:

- Henry Burton (Conservative politician) (1876–1947), British Conservative MP for Sudbury (1924–1945)
- Henry Burton (physician) (1799–1849), English physician
- Henry Burton (theologian) (1578–1648), English Puritan
- Henry Burton (South African politician) (1866–1935), cabinet minister in first Union government
- Henry Stanton Burton (1819–1869), American Army officer
- Henry Burton (cricketer) (1874–1964), English cricketer
- Henry Marley Burton (1821–1880), British architect

== See also ==
- Henry Burton Buckley, 1st Baron Wrenbury, British barrister and judge
- Henry Burton-Peters (1792–1874), English Whig Member of Parliament for Beverley (1830–1837)
- Harry Burton (disambiguation)
