= Ernest Bale =

English cricketer

Personal information
- Full name: Ernest William Bale
- Born: 18 September 1878; Mitcham, Surrey, England
- Died: 6 July 1952 (aged 73); Carshalton, Surrey, England
- Batting: Right-handed
- Role: Wicket-keeper

Domestic team information
- Years: Team
- 1904: London County
- 1904: Surrey
- 1908—1920: Worcestershire
- FC debut: 6 June 1904 London County v Leicestershire
- Last FC: 23 August 1920 Worcestershire v Lancashire

Career statistics
Competition	First-class
Matches	148
Runs scored	1,221
Batting average	8.30
100s/50s	0/0
Top score	43
Balls bowled	330
Wickets	9
Bowling average	25.55
5 wickets in innings	0
10 wickets in match	0
Best bowling	3/46
Catches/stumpings	251/90
- Source: CricketArchive, 13 September 2007

Ernest William Bale (18 September 1878 – 6 July 1952) was an English cricketer who played 148 first-class matches between 1904 and 1920, the great majority of these (138) being for Worcestershire, for whom he was the first-choice wicket-keeper for several years before the First World War. Roy Genders considered that Bale's keeping in 1911, when Worcestershire came ninth in the County Championship — their best finish until 1939 — "contributed greatly towards such an excellent season".

Bale played for Surrey's Second XI in the Minor Counties Championship as early as June 1902, but his first-class debut came exactly two years later, when he appeared for London County against Leicestershire at Crystal Palace Park. Bale claimed a single dismissal, of Harry Whitehead, scoring 4* and 22* with the bat. Later that month, Bale made his Surrey debut, against Oxford University at The Oval, and for the remainder of the season he divided his time between Surrey and London County.

Following his final game for London County, he did not play another first-class game for almost four years. Bale played a few times for Surrey's Second XI in 1905, but then determined to qualify for another county, Worcestershire.

He made his debut for Worcestershire in May 1908, against Marylebone Cricket Club (MCC) at Lord's; he performed two stumpings, held one catch, and scored 2 and 27. Although he only played eight more games that summer, the following year he was selected on 13 occasions, and by 1910 he had taken over from George Gaukrodger as Worcestershire's number one keeper. He was selected for The Rest to face champions Kent at the end of the season, and Wisden adjudged him second only to Strudwick in England.

Bale played in two official Test Trial games in 1911, but made little impression in either and, with Strudwick now in possession of the England keeper's spot, never came so close to England selection again. For Worcestershire, however, he continued to play consistently up until the First World War; he made his highest score of 43 for the county against the touring South Africans in May 1912. After the war, he played a few more times for Worcestershire, but his place behind the stumps was now mostly being taken by the ill-fated Arthur Jewell and Bale retired from the game in 1920.

Bale was an occasional bowler, and took the first of his nine first-class wickets for London County in 1904, claiming the scalp of Warwickshire's Tom Fishwick. His best bowling of 3–46 was achieved for Worcestershire against H. K. Foster's XI at Hereford in 1919.
