= James Gilman (cricketer) =

English cricketer (1879–1976)

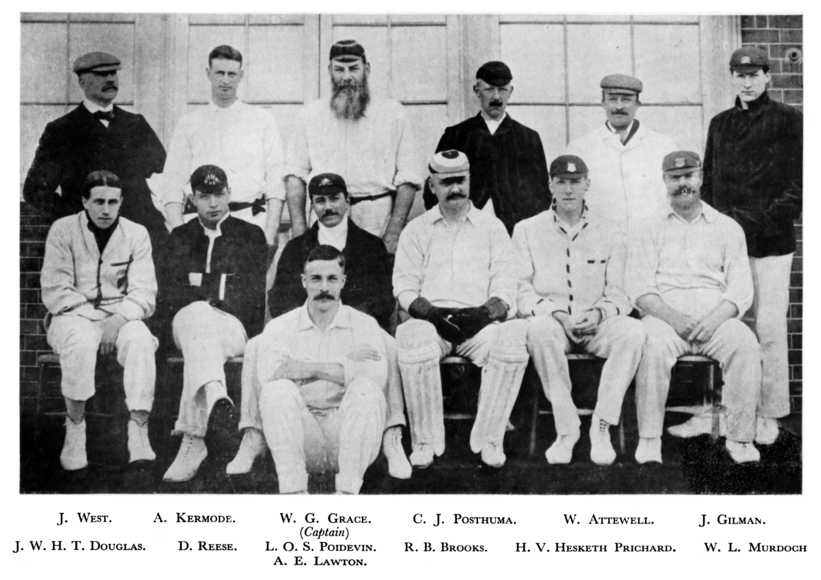
- The London County team in June 1903. Gilman is standing at far right.

Personal information
- Born: 17 March 1879; Marylebone, Middlesex, England
- Died: 14 September 1976 (aged 97); Shoreham-by-Sea, West Sussex, England
- Batting: Right-handed
- Bowling: Right-arm slow

Domestic team information
- Years: Team
- 1900 to 1904: London County
- 1900 to 1901: Middlesex
- 1901 to 1902: Cambridge University

Career statistics
Competition	First-class
Matches	41
Runs scored	977
Batting average	16.55
100s/50s	0/2
Top score	72*
Balls bowled	228
Wickets	3
Bowling average	46.00
5 wickets in innings	0
10 wickets in match	0
Best bowling	2/74
Catches/stumpings	21/0
- Source: Cricinfo, 6 August 2021

James Gilman (17 March 1879 – 14 September 1976) was an English cricketer who played first-class cricket for London County, Middlesex and Cambridge University from 1900 to 1904.

Gilman was educated at St Paul's School in London and Jesus College, Cambridge. An electrical engineer, he served as a major in the Royal Army Service Corps in World War One.

At 97 years and 182 days when he died in 1976, Gilman was Middlesex's longest-lived player until Rusi Cooper overtook his record in 2020. The 1977 edition of Wisden carried, as well as Gilman's obituary, an interview he had given a few weeks before he died on his memories of playing alongside W. G. Grace for London County.
