= Bill Murch =

English cricketer

Personal information
- Full name: William Henry Murch
- Born: 18 November 1867; Bristol, England
- Died: 1 May 1928 (aged 60); Bristol, England
- Batting: Right-handed

Domestic team information
- Years: Team
- 1889-1906: Gloucestershire
- Source: Cricinfo, 30 March 2014

William Henry Murch (18 November 1867 – 1 May 1928) was an English cricketer active from 1889 to 1906 who played for Gloucestershire and London County. He appeared in 88 first-class matches as a righthanded batsman who bowled right arm medium pace. He scored 1,337 runs with a highest score of 58 and held 41 catches. An occasional wicketkeeper, he also completed one stumping. He took 207 wickets with a best analysis of eight for 68.
