= George Gill (cricketer) =

English cricketer

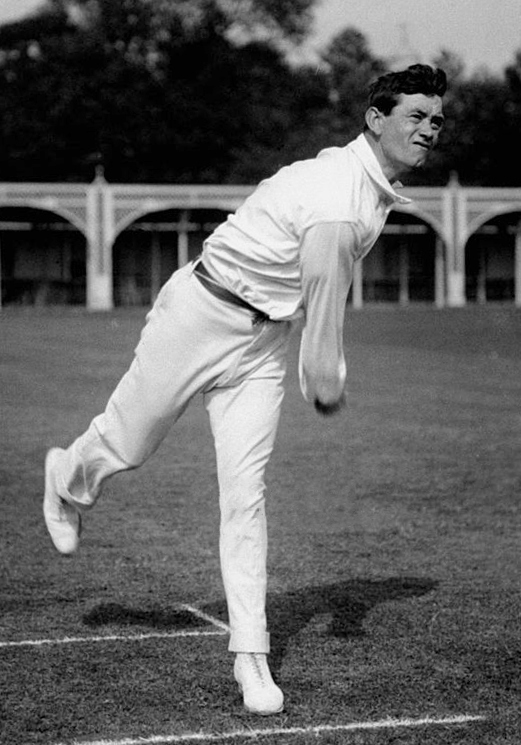
- Gill pictured in about 1905

Personal information
- Full name: George Cooper Gill
- Born: 18 April 1876; Mountsorrel, Leicestershire, England
- Died: 21 August 1937 (aged 61); Leicester, England
- Batting: Right-handed
- Bowling: Right-arm fast-medium

Career statistics
Competition	First-class
Matches	171
Runs scored	4,160
Batting average	16.06
100s/50s	1/19
Top score	100
Balls bowled	21,928
Wickets	465
Bowling average	25.36
5 wickets in innings	26
10 wickets in match	3
Best bowling	9/89
Catches/stumpings	74/–
- Source: CricketArchive, 4 May 2010

George Cooper Gill (18 April 1876 – 21 August 1937) was an English first-class cricketer who played in 171 matches for Somerset, Leicestershire and London County between 1897 and 1906.

A right-hand bat and right-arm fast medium, Gill scored 4,160 runs (including one century) and took 465 wickets at 25.36 runs per wicket.
