= Percival Gale =

English cricketer

Personal information
- Full name: Percival George Gale
- Born: 22 May 1865; Kensington, London, England
- Died: 7 September 1940 (aged 75); Croydon, Surrey, England
- Batting: Right-handed
- Bowling: Unknown

Domestic team information
- Years: Team
- 1901–1904: London County

Career statistics
Competition	First-class
Matches	11
Runs scored	140
Batting average	8.75
100s/50s	–/–
Top score	40
Balls bowled	96
Wickets	0
Bowling average	–
5 wickets in innings	–
10 wickets in match	–
Best bowling	–
Catches/stumpings	5/–
- Source: Cricinfo, 31 August 2019

Percival George Gale (22 May 1865 – 7 September 1940) was an English first-class cricketer.

Gale was born in at Kensington in May 1865. He made his debut in first-class cricket for London County against Surrey at Crystal Palace in 1901. Gale played first-class cricket for London County until 1904, making ten appearances. He scored 130 runs in his ten matches, at an average of 9.28 and a high score of 40. He also bowled sixteen wicketless overs across his ten matches, conceding 37 runs. In addition to playing first-class cricket for London County, Gale also made a single appearance for W. G. Grace's personal XI against the touring West Indians at Crystal Palace in 1906.

Outside of the first-class game, Gale played for with success for Walham Green and was vice-president of the Wanderers Cricket Club. He also served in the Metropolitan Special Constabulary, rising to the rank of chief inspector. Gale died at Croydon in September 1940.
