= Nigel Harrison (cricketer) =

English cricketer

Personal information
- Full name: Nigel Sydney Augustine Harrison
- Born: 29 November 1878; Maidstone, Kent, England
- Died: 13 November 1947 (aged 68); Norton, County Durham, England
- Batting: Right-handed
- Bowling: Right-arm fast-medium

Domestic team information
- Years: Team
- 1902–1905: Durham
- 1900: London County

Career statistics
Competition	First-class
Matches	4
Runs scored	37
Batting average	6.16
100s/50s	–/–
Top score	18
Balls bowled	–
Wickets	–
Bowling average	–
5 wickets in innings	–
10 wickets in match	–
Best bowling	–
Catches/stumpings	3/–
- Source: Cricinfo, 1 January 2012

Nigel Sydney Augustine Harrison (29 November 1878 – 13 November 1947) was an English cricketer. Harrison was a right-handed batsman who bowled right-arm fast-medium. He was born at Maidstone, Kent, and was educated at Haileybury.

Harrison made his first-class debut for London County against Warwickshire in 1900. He made three further first-class appearances for London County in that season, against Worcestershire, Warwickshire, and the Marylebone Cricket Club. In had little success in his four first-class appearances, scoring a total of 37 runs at an average of 6.16, with a high score of 18. He later moved to the north of England, playing for Durham in Minor Counties Championship against Northumberland in 1902 and the Yorkshire Second XI.

By 1901, he was a part of the 1st Volunteer Brigade, within the Durham Light Infantry. In March 1901 he was granted the rank of 2nd Lieutenant, while in May 1902, he was promoted to Lieutenant. Harrison married Florence Kirk, the widower of Lord Charles Stewart Reginald Vane-Tempest-Stewart (son of Charles Vane-Tempest-Stewart, 6th Marquess of Londonderry), on 3 June 1903. In February 1904, he resigned his commission within the Durham Light Infantry. Harrison died at Norton, County Durham on 13 November 1947.
