= M. H. Horsley =

English timber merchant, shipowner, and philatelist

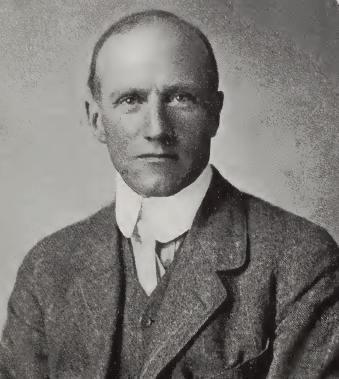
M. H. Horsley

Matthew Henry Horsley, JP (24 June 1867 – 17 February 1925) was an English timber merchant, shipowner, and philatelist noted for his collections of Canadian and Australian stamps.

== Early life and family ==
Matthew Horsley was born at Hartlepool on 24 June 1867, the oldest son of timber merchant George Horsley and his wife. He attended The Leys School in Cambridge and matriculated at Christ's College, University of Cambridge, in 1884 but did not take a degree.

He married Clara Maclean at Hartlepool in 1893. They had sons, George, Henry, and Neville, and a daughter Clara. In 1923, the engagement was announced of Clara, daughter of M.H. Horsley and Mrs Horsley of Brinkburn, West Hartlepool, to Guy Mainwaring Morton, barrister.

== Career ==
Horsley joined his father's firm of timber merchants, George Horsley & Company of West Hartlepool. He was the appointed manager of the Mobile, owned by the Horsley Line Limited, when the ship was lost in the Atlantic with all hands (26) some time after leaving the United States for Britain on 28 December 1900. He was also a ship-owner and regularly appeared in the maritime news in The Times from 1904. He owned the steamer Verax, insured for £19,000, when she was in collision of St John (Orleans Island) with the Athenia in 1904 and in 1905 he was the owner of the turret-decked steamer Greenbank of 3,880 tons, insured for £36,000. In 1906, his ship the Horsley, of 3,717 tons built in 1901, en route from Grimsby to Bombay, was reported aground at Nicok Spit according to a telegram from Suez.

== Politics and civic affairs ==
Horsely was active in local politics and civic affairs. He was elected mayor of Hartlepool in 1910 and in 1922 he gave a banquet at West Hartlepool in honour of former prime minister and Liberal Party politician, H. H. Asquith. He was vice-chairman of the Northern Liberal Federation. In addition, he was a justice of the peace for Durham and the county borough of West Hartlepool.

== Recreations ==
Horsley played cricket for Durham in the Minor Counties Championship of 1897 and other matches. He later gave up cricket for fishing.

He began to collect stamps in 1900 after buying some for his son and formed a leading collection of Canadian stamps. He later moved on to the stamps of Australian states and had a fine collection of the Sydney Views of New South Wales as well as notable collections of Victoria and Western Australia. He was elected to membership of the Philatelic Society London, later the Royal Philatelic Society London, in 1901 and gave a display of his Canadian stamps there in January 1907. He was elected a fellow of the society.

== Death and legacy ==
Horsley died at Sidmouth, Devonshire, on 17 February 1925 of a heart attack following influenza. He was buried at Stranton Grange Cemetery, Hartlepool. His wife was buried in the same plot on her death in 1961. He left an estate of £274,009 with probate granted to his widow, George Horsley merchant, William Share Maclean shipowner and John Collingwood Fortune chartered accountant. He left a legacy of £1,000 to the Abbey Church of St Hilda, Hartlepool, which was used for the restoration of the building. His home of Brinkburn was purchased by the local authority and turned into a school.
