= John Noble (privateer) =

English pirate (died 1574)

Coordinates: 9°05′51″N 81°33′29″W

Captain John Noble
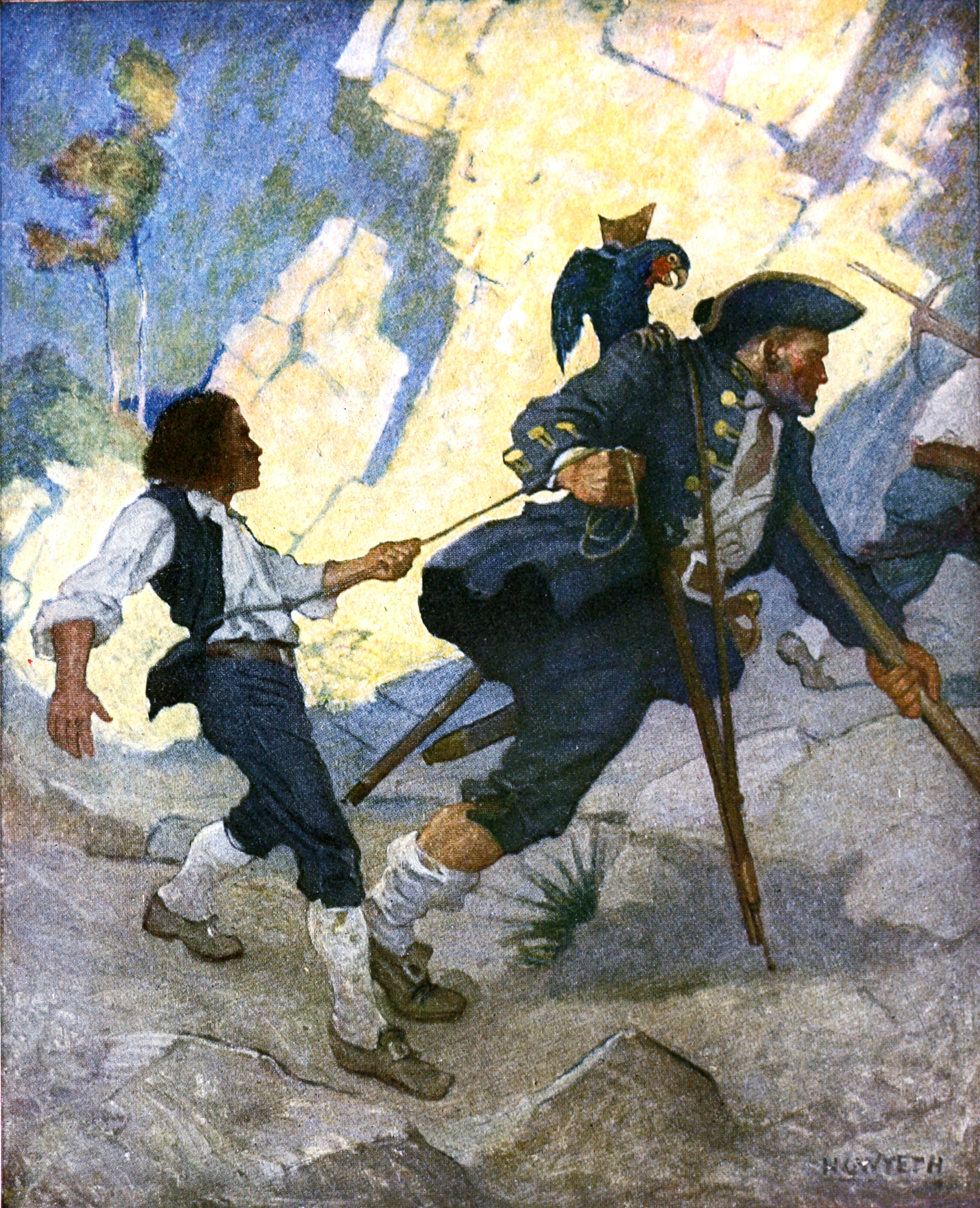
- Stereotypical English pirate
- Died: June–September 1574; Nombre de Dios
- Cause of death: Public hanging
- Era: Elizabethan
- Known for: Cruising off Veraguas (Note: Also Veragua. Extended from Cape Gracias a Dios to Rio Belen (de jure), thus encompassing part of the Mosquito Shore.)
- Opponent: Pedro Godínez Osorio (Note: Governor of Veraguas.)
- Criminal charge: Piracy
- Criminal penalty: Death
- Criminal status: Convicted
- Piratical career
- Type: English pirate or sea dog
- Allegiance: England
- Years active: 1574
- Rank: Captain
- Base of operations: Mosquito Gulf

John Noble (d. 1574) was an English pirate or sea dog who led a maritime expedition in 1574 against Spanish merchant shipping in the Mosquito Gulf, off the western Caribbean coast of Veraguas, in what is now Nicaragua, Costa Rica and Panama. At first, the captain had some success in amassing a sizeable booty out of Escudo de Veraguas Isle in early June, but was eventually captured by the Spanish later that month. Noble and his crew were charged and convicted of piracy, the sentence for which was death. The captain was thus executed during a public hanging in Nombre de Dios by September 1574.

== Career ==
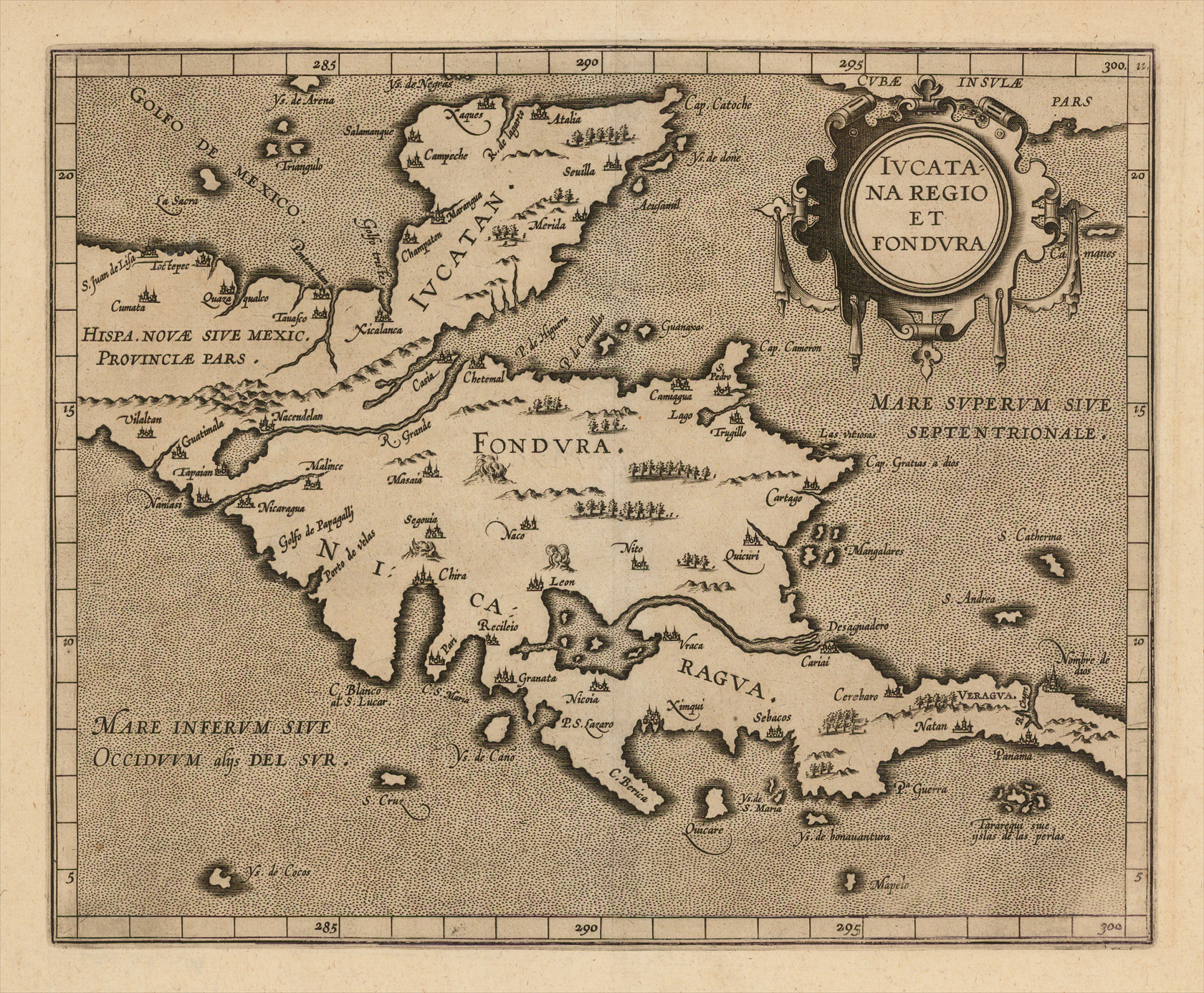
Veraguas ('Veragua', bottom right) and Spanish Honduras ('Fondura', centre) in the 16th century; charts the Chagres and Nombre de Dios too ('R. Chagre' and 'Nombre de dios', bottom right)

According to American historian Irene A. Wright, in the first quarter of 1573, English pirate or sea dog John Noble may have spent some days or weeks cruising the shores of Spanish Honduras, at about the same time as, or perhaps even in consort with, Francis Drake or John Oxenham (in the Minion or Bear, respectively).

Whatever the case, by 1574, it is certain that Noble, with a crew of 28 Englishmen aboard a ship of four heavy pieces and four falcons, landed in Escudo de Veraguas Isle, some twelve nautical leguas off the primary port of Veraguas, sometime during the first half of June. The isle's location, on a sea lane used by Spanish merchant vessels bound for the said port, (Note: Part of the Spanish carrera de Indias.) seems to have been its primary draw for the captain. From this advantageous base, Noble set about cruising or plundering the mainland shore on two launch boats, seizing a number of laden Spanish frigates and barques off the Cativas headland (Note: Site of modern Cativá.) and the Chagres River. According to Hunter College historian Ruth Pike, during this coastal cruise, the pirates may have reached out to the cimarrons to plead for aid, but apparently had less luck with this than Drake had had just two years prior (with Chief Pedro).

=== Capture ===
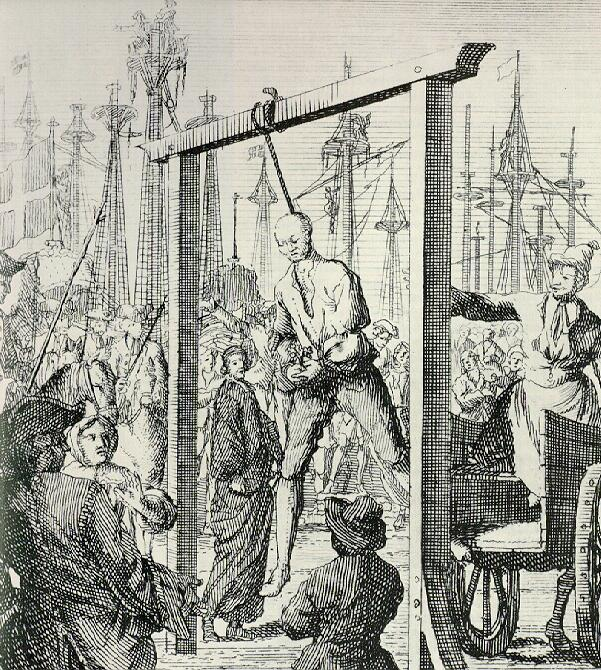
As with other pirates (illustrated), John Noble was convicted of piracy by Spanish authorities and died by public hanging in Nombre de Dios in 1574

The Spanish governor of Varaguas, Pedro Godinez Osorio, was first made aware of the Englishmen's depradations sometime towards the middle of June 1574, after a Spanish merchant barque managed to successfully rebuff a hijacking attempt by Noble. Not wishing to waste any time, Godinez immediately outfitted a rowing frigate in Nombre de Dios with thirty harquebusiers, and set off in pursuit of the pirates. The governor's frigate soon caught sight of Noble's ship, firing four or five shots at her, but the men attempted to slip away from the Spanish by crowding into one of the launches on board the pirate ship. Godinez, however, gave chase right away, aboard a brig and a launch, and eventually forced Noble to run aground near the Chagres, after capturing two crewmen and drowning four. The wrecked pirates then had the misfortune of being discovered by a former victim of theirs, who recognised and promptly detained them. Criminal charges were bought against Noble and 27 of his surviving crew, all of whom were soon convicted of piracy. With the exception of two ship's boys, who were given life sentences, all were sentenced to death and so executed. Noble and two of his crew, though, were saved for a well-attended public hanging in Nombre de Dios, carried out later that month or sometime during the third quarter of 1574.

In a Spanish account of this incident, dated Panama, 22 September 1574, a Veraguas official reported to the Spanish crown, "the galleons having left Nombre de Dios, in the direction of Veragua there appeared one morning an English corsair calling himself John Noble, who had been in that vicinity when the last [treasure] fleet was here. He pillaged certain barks and frigates of the coastwise trade and began to disturb this realm. God granted that by means of the measures taken both at Nombre de Dios and also at Veragua he should be captured with all his men, twenty-eight in all. They were all killed, excepting two boys who were condemned to the galleys for life and are now serving in your majesty's galleons. The captain and two of them were hanged at Nombre de Dios, which has occasioned great joy and animated all, and the realm is entirely quiet".

=== Aftermath ===
By early 1575, Godinez was of the opinion that, "certainly this province is much vexed by corsairs. They never leave these ports, because only from here do the frigates [of the treasure fleet] get gold".

== See also ==
- Gilbert Horseley – raided Veraguas in 1575
- Piracy in the Mosquito Gulf

== Notes and references ==
=== References ===
1. Bradley, Peter T. (1999). British maritime enterprise in the New World : from the late fifteenth to the mid-eighteenth century. Studies in British history; v. 57 (1st ed.). Lewiston, NY: Edwin Mellen Press. hdl:2027/mdp.39015054149409. ISBN 9780773478664. OCLC 42290563.
2. Hakluyt, Richard, ed. (1600). The principal nauigations, voiages, traffiques and discoueries of the English nation made by sea or ouer-land, to the remote and farthest distant quarters of the earth, at any time within the compasse of these 1500. yeeres: deuided into three seuerall volumes, according to the positions of the regions, whereunto they were directed. Vol. 3 (2nd expanded ed.). London: George Bishop, Ralfe Newberie, & Robert Barker. OCLC 252871354. ProQuest 2248550788.
3. Marley, David F. (1998). Wars of the Americas : a chronology of armed conflict in the New World, 1492 to the present (1st ed.). Santa Barbara, CA: ABC-CLIO. hdl:2027/mdp.49015002845379. ISBN 9780874368376. OCLC 39024726.
4. Pike, Ruth (October 2007). "Black Rebels: The Cimarrons of Sixteenth-Century Panama". Americas. 64 (2): 243–266. doi:10.1353/tam.2007.0161. JSTOR 30139087. S2CID 143773521.
5. Williamson, James A. (1938). The age of Drake. Pioneer histories, edited by V. T. Harlow ... And J. A. Williamson (1st ed.). London: Adam and Charles Black. hdl:2027/mdp.39015014588183. OCLC 1421005.
6. Wright, Irene A., ed. (1932). Documents concerning English voyages to the Spanish main, 1569-1580. Works issued by the Hakluyt Society; 2nd ser., no. 71 (1st ed.). London: Printed for the Hakluyt Society. hdl:2027/mdp.39015012306133. OCLC 1476408.
