= William Davis (cricketer, born 1880) =

English cricketer

William Ernest Davis (26 November 1880 – 27 January 1959) was an English cricketer who played first-class cricket between 1903 and 1911 for Surrey, London County and the South of England.
