= Beresford Horsley =

English cricketer

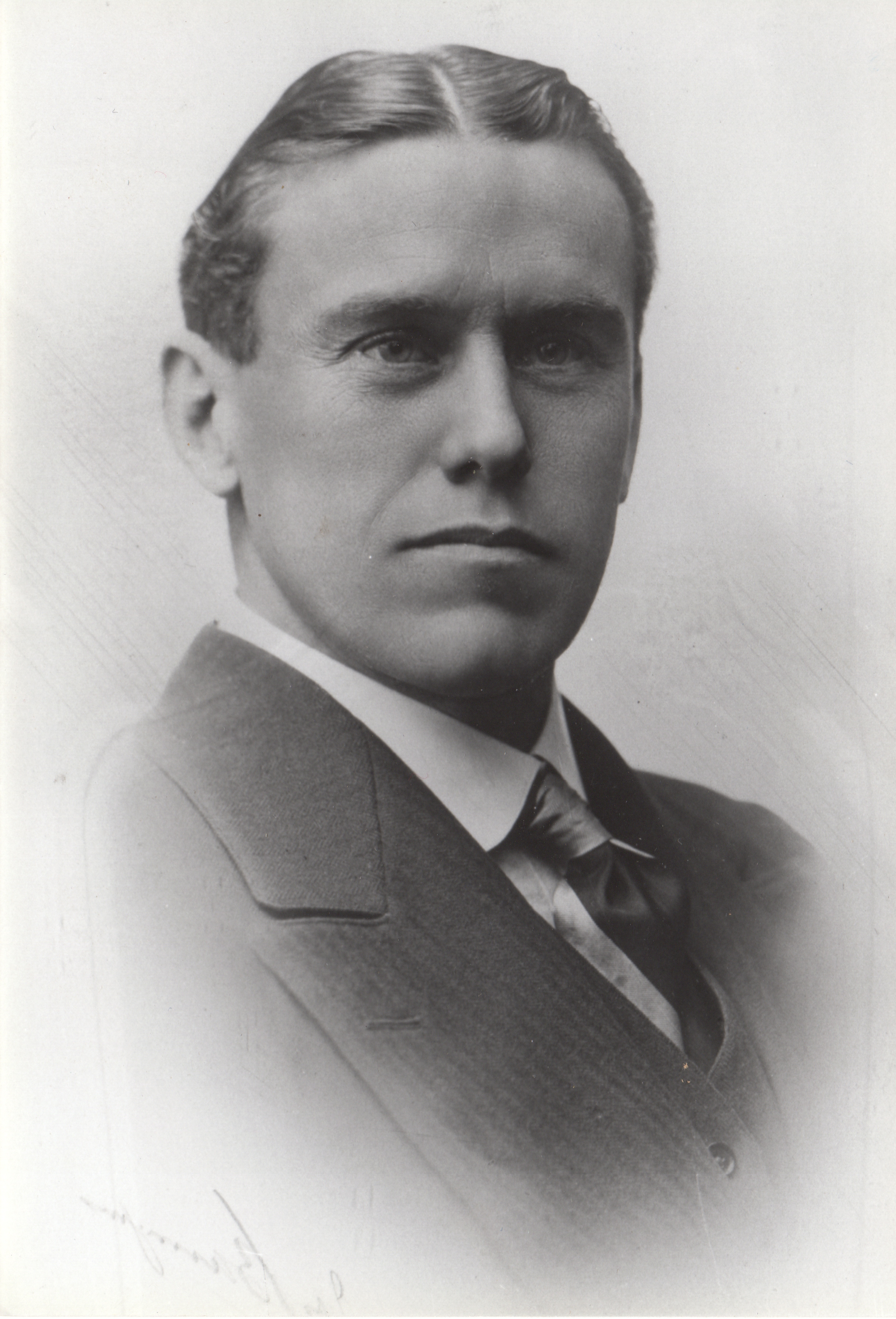

Personal information
- Full name: Albert Beresford Horsley
- Born: 2 January 1880; Hartlepool, County Durham, England
- Died: 19 November 1923 (aged 43); West Hartlepool, County Durham, England
- Batting: Unknown
- Bowling: Unknown
- Relatives: Rupert Horsley (son)

Domestic team information
- Years: Team
- 1904: London County
- 1897–1914: Durham

Career statistics
Competition	First-class
Matches	1
Runs scored	24
Batting average	24.00
100s/50s	–/–
Top score	24
Balls bowled	30
Wickets	–
Bowling average	–
5 wickets in innings	–
10 wickets in match	–
Best bowling	–
Catches/stumpings	2/–
- Source: Cricinfo, 8 September 2011

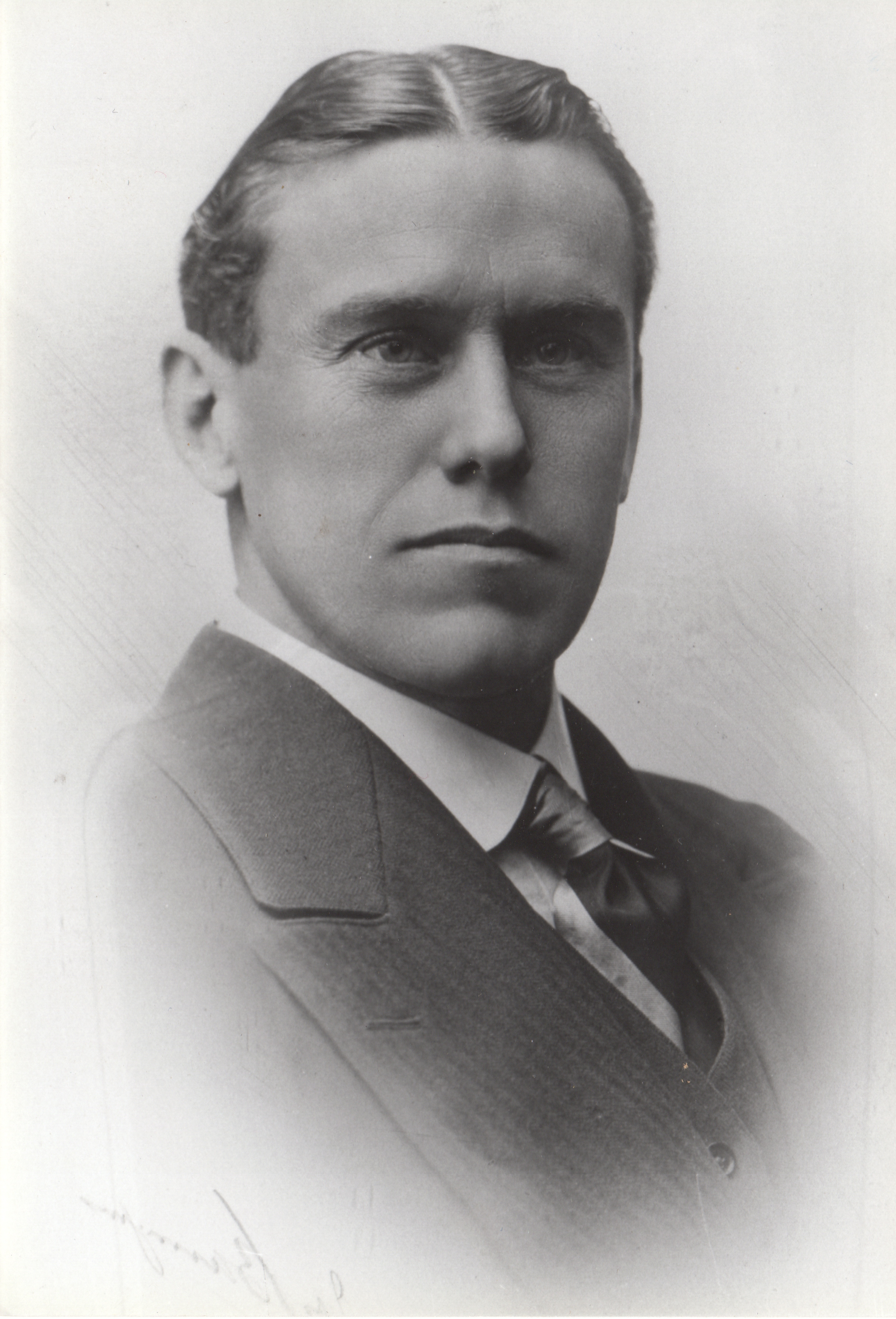
Portrait of Albert Beresford Horsley

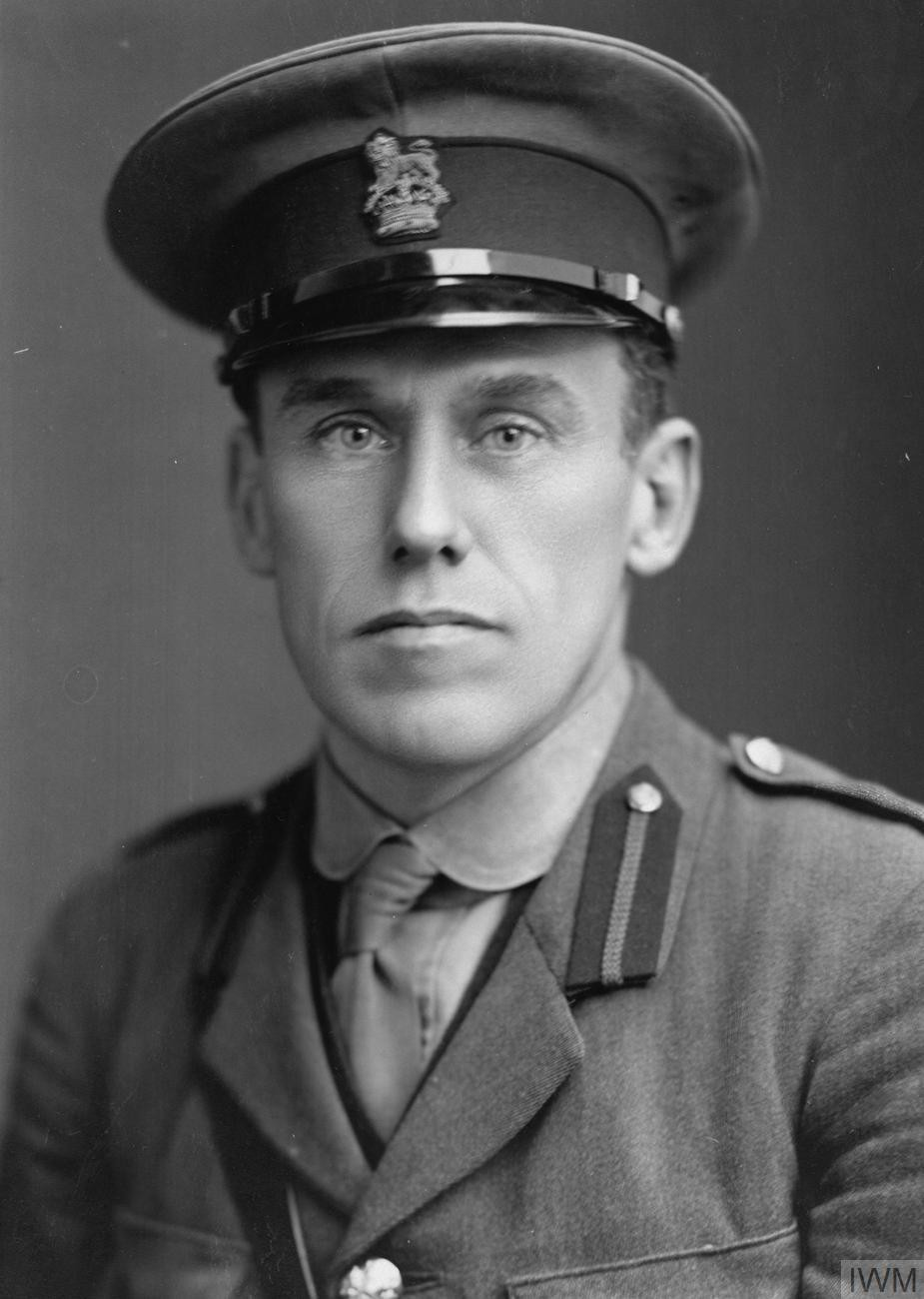

Albert Beresford Horsley CBE, JP (2 January 1880 – 19 November 1923) was an English cricketer. Horsley's batting and bowling styles are unknown. He was born in Hartlepool, County Durham, to George and Alethea Horsley, and educated at the Leys School, where he obtained his colours in 1896. At the Leys he held the school record for a long jump of 20 ft 10".

When he was five, one of his father's ships - the Beresford - was named after him on the 28 July 1885.

He married Ethel Rose Cox, daughter of Eliza Julia Cox, in 1903; the 1911 Census shows the family staying in Weston, and he described himself as a Shipowner and Timber Merchant. They had seven children including the author, glider pilot and journalist Terence Horsley, who worked for Allied Newspapers (which became Kemsley Newspapers); cricketer, schoolmaster and watercolourist Rupert Horsley; and Peter Horsley, who was equerry to the Duke of Edinburgh and Queen Elizabeth, became an Air Marshal and was knighted.

Horsley made his debut for Durham in the 1897 Minor Counties Championship against Norfolk. He played Minor counties cricket for Durham from 1897 to 1905, making 21 Minor Counties Championship appearances and scoring over 500 runs, with a highest score of 98 against Glamorgan in 1905. He later added a further appearance for Durham in the 1914 Minor Counties Championship. He played in a single first-class match in the 1904 season for London County against Warwickshire. He batted once in the match, scoring 24 runs in London County's first-innings before being dismissed by Willie Quaife. W.G.Grace, Captain of London County for the match, scored 10 and 14. With the ball, Horsley bowled a total of 5 wicket-less overs. He also played twice for the MCC, and once for the North Yorkshire and South Durham Cricket League, playing against Durham and scoring 102 not out in July 1920.

He was Honorary Secretary of the Durham County Cricket Club from 1905 - 1920, and for some years was captain of the West Hartlepool C.C.; the club won five titles in 15 years, sharing another and being runners-up another 5 times. During the Great War he and his brother Matthew helped to finance the club's debts.

In late 1906 he was listed in the London Gazette as a Land Tax Commissioner for County Durham. In 1920, he received a CBE for his services in the war as a deputy director of Recruiting for the Ministry of National Service, contributing financially to the 18th Battalion of the Durham Light Infantry. He was a made a Fellow of the Royal Geographical Society in 1920, having written a book of reminiscences of Egypt, 'Round About Egypt and other things' published in 1920 by Selwyn and Blount, and travelled widely both there and in East Africa.

In 1916 he applied for and was granted, in conjunction with George Robert Nicholson, a global patent GB100861A in connection with improvements relating to syphons.

When The Gray Art Gallery and Museum was given to West Hartlepool and opened to the public in 1920 Horsley donated a picture to it.

He committed suicide at West Hartlepool, County Durham in October 1923 as a result of business worries.
