= Richard Voss (cricketer) =

English cricketer (1880–1948)

Personal information
- Full name: Richard Zahn Hartwig Voss
- Born: 10 November 1880; Dunham, Cheshire, England
- Died: 3 September 1948 (aged 67); Flixton, Lancashire, England
- Batting: Right-handed

Domestic team information
- Years: Team
- 1901–1903: Oxford University
- 1903: London County
- 1909–1914: Cheshire

Career statistics
| Competition | First-class |
|---|---|
| Matches | 8 |
| Runs scored | 276 |
| Batting average | 18.40 |
| 100s/50s | –/1 |
| Top score | 50 |
| Balls bowled | 42 |
| Wickets | 0 |
| Bowling average | – |
| 5 wickets in innings | – |
| 10 wickets in match | – |
| Best bowling | – |
| Catches/stumpings | 2/– |
- Source: Cricinfo, 27 February 2019

Richard Zahn Hartwig Voss (10 November 1880 – 3 September 1948) was an English first-class cricketer.

Voss was born at Dunham, Cheshire. He later attended Lincoln College, Oxford. While at Oxford he played first-class cricket for Oxford University, making his debut against the Marylebone Cricket Club at Oxford in 1901. Voss played first-class cricket for Oxford University from 1901 to 1903, making seven appearances. He scored 264 runs for Oxford University at an average of 20.30, with a high score of 50. He also made a first-class appearance for London County against Lancashire in 1903. He later played minor counties cricket for Cheshire from 1909–1914, making nine appearances in the Minor Counties Championship.

After graduating from Oxford, Voss became a lawyer. He died at Flixton in September 1948.
