= Leonidas de Montezuma =

English cricketer

Personal information
- Full name: Leonidas de Toledo Marcondes de Montezuma
- Born: 16 April 1869; Crowborough, Sussex, England
- Died: 18 March 1937 (aged 67); Stone, Kent, England
- Batting: Right-handed
- Bowling: Unknown

Domestic team information
- Years: Team
- 1904: London County
- 1898: Sussex

Career statistics
Competition	First-class
Matches	9
Runs scored	285
Batting average	25.90
100s/50s	0/1
Top score	80*
Balls bowled	104
Wickets	4
Bowling average	20.75
5 wickets in innings	0
10 wickets in match	0
Best bowling	4/71
Catches/stumpings	2/–
- Source: Cricinfo, 27 February 2012

Leonidas de Toledo Marcondes de Montezuma (16 April 1869 – 18 March 1937) was an English cricketer and allround sportsman who also competed as a cyclist.

== Life ==
De Montezuma was born at Crowborough, Sussex, the sixth of nine children. His parents were born in England, although his father was at one stage a lieutenant in the Brazilian navy.

He was a boarder at the Royal Naval School in London. He went into business with a brother-in-law, but the business was dissolved in 1892. At around the time of his father's death in 1895 he became a patient at the Bethlem Hospital, Beckenham, probably suffering from bipolar disorder.

He had a variety of occupations, and never married. At the time of his death in 1937 he was a patient at the City of London Mental Hospital in Stone, Kent.

== Cricket career ==
De Montezuma was a right-handed batsman whose bowling style is unknown. He was a prominent batsman in the 1890s for the Norwood club in Surrey. He made his first-class debut for Sussex against Essex in the 1898 County Championship at the County Ground, Leyton. He made seven further first-class appearances for Sussex in that season, the last of which came against Lancashire at Old Trafford. In his eight first-class matches for Sussex, he scored 271 runs at an average of 27.10, with a high score of 80 not out.

He later played a single first-class match for London County in 1904 against Warwickshire at Crystal Palace Park. In Warwickshire's first-innings of 326, De Montezuma took four wickets, finishing with figures of 4/71, which were the best bowling figures in that innings. He scored 14 runs in London County's first-innings response of 249, before being dismissed by James Byrne. He wasn't called upon to bat or bowl again in the match, which ended in a draw.
