= Richard Brooks (cricketer) =

English cricketer

Richard Brooks (29 July 1863 – 9 April 1927) was an English first-class cricketer active from 1889 to 1903, who played for Surrey and London County. He was born in Sutton-on-Sea, Lincolnshire, and died in Kensington.
