= Richard Bell (cricketer) =

English cricketer

Personal information
- Full name: Richard Moore Bell
- Born: 1 January 1874; Wigton, Cumberland, England
- Died: 10 June 1953 (aged 79); Brighton, Sussex, England
- Batting: Right-handed
- Bowling: Right-arm off break

Domestic team information
- Years: Team
- 1902–1904: London County

Career statistics
Competition	First-class
Matches	15
Runs scored	225
Batting average	11.25
100s/50s	–/–
Top score	31*
Balls bowled	1,107
Wickets	31
Bowling average	28.67
5 wickets in innings	2
10 wickets in match	–
Best bowling	6/88
Catches/stumpings	10/–
- Source: Cricinfo, 29 July 2019

Richard Moore Bell (1 January 1874 – 10 June 1953) was an English first-class cricketer.

Bell was born at Wigton on New Year's Day in 1874. When he was a child, his family moved to Australia, where he attended the Melbourne Grammar School, before returning to England where he attended The Leys School. He made his debut in first-class cricket for London County against Ireland at Crystal Palace in 1902. He played for London County until 1904, making eight appearances. He made two first-class appearances for the Gentlemen of England against Oxford University in 1905, before playing for the Gentlemen of England against Surrey in 1906. Bell also played three first-class matches for W. G. Grace's XI in 1906, playing twice against Cambridge University and once against the touring West Indians. His final first-class appearance came in 1908, for the Gentlemen of England against Surrey at The Oval. In fifteen first-class appearances, Bell scored 225 runs with a high score of 31 not out, while with his right-arm off break bowling he took 31 wickets at an average of 28.67, with best figures of 6 for 88. These figures, one of two first-class five wicket hauls he took, came on debut against Ireland. He toured Egypt with the Marylebone Cricket Club in 1909, led by Lord Brackley.

He later served with the Royal Marines as a second lieutenant in the closing stages of the First World War. Bell died at Brighton in June 1953.
