= Theodore Tapp =

English cricketer and British Army officer

Personal information
- Full name: Theodore Arthur Tapp
- Born: 15 April 1883; Shortlands, Kent, England
- Died: 21 October 1917 (aged 34); Vleteren, West Flanders, Belgium
- Batting: Right-handed
- Bowling: Right-arm fast

Career statistics
Competition	First-class
Matches	1
Runs scored	9
Batting average	4.50
100s/50s	–/–
Top score	5
Balls bowled	214
Wickets	5
Bowling average	19.80
5 wickets in innings	1
10 wickets in match	–
Best bowling	5/99
Catches/stumpings	–/–
- Source: Cricinfo, 20 January 2021

Theodore Arthur Tapp MC & Bar (5 April 1883 – 21 October 1917) was an English officer of the British Army and first-class cricketer.

== Life ==
The son of Charles James Tapp and his wife Olga Marie Henriette Andreae, he was born in April 1883 at Shortlands, Kent. He was educated at Rugby School, before going up to Gonville and Caius College, Cambridge.

After graduating from Cambridge, Theodore Tapp intended to pursue a career in the Diplomatic Service, but ill health put paid to that ambition and he instead joined the London Stock Exchange in 1905, becoming a partner in the firm C. Andreae and Company. His sporting interests outside of cricket included golf.

Tapp served in the First World War and was commissioned at the start of the conflict as a second lieutenant in the Coldstream Guards in September 1914. On 25 January 1915, he was wounded in action while operating a machine gun. Undeterred, he had his wound treated and returned to his post on the same day to assist with a British counter-attack. Following this action he returned home to recover. He was made a temporary lieutenant in April 1915, gaining the rank in full in October of the same year. He remained in the trenches of the Western Front until he was again wounded in action in January 1916, which necessitated another period of recovery at home. Upon his return to the front, he was assigned to the Guards Machine Gun Regiment. He held the temporary ranks of captain and major, while commanding a machine gun company, relinquishing the latter in June 1916. He was awarded the Military Cross in July 1917 for actions during the Third Battle of Ypres. Four nights before the First Battle of Passchendaele, Tapp personally inspected the British guns while under heavy shelling and sniper fire. For this he was awarded what would turn out to be a posthumous bar to his Military Cross.

Tapp was seriously wounded on 11 October 1917, one day before the commencement of the First Battle of Passchendaele. He was evacuated to a casualty clearing station, where he succumbed to his wounds on 21 October.

== Cricket ==
Tapp played cricket for Caius College, but did not play for Cambridge University Cricket Club. Despite this, he did play first-class cricket while at Cambridge, appearing once for London County against Cambridge University at Fenner's in 1904. With his right-arm fast bowling he took a five wicket haul in the Cambridge first innings, with figures of 5 for 99. He batted twice in the match, scoring 5 runs in London County's first innings, before being dismissed by Guy Napier, while in their second innings he was dismissed for 4 runs by John Hopley.

== Family ==
Tapp married in 1905 Margaret F. P. Flagg, daughter of Elisha Flagg of New York. At the time of her death in 1919, Margaret was married to the army officer Leonard W. Hancock. Margaret's brother James Montgomery Flagg was scathing in Roses and Buckshot: she was "a beautiful and utterly selfish typical American girl" and Theodore was "a good-looking rotter, a Cambridge man, rich and very smart" who "had never packed a suitcase or ridden on a bus in his life." He stated that the couple divorced.
