= Gordon Black (cricketer) =

Australian cricketer

Personal information
- Born: 19 January 1885; Sydney, Australia
- Died: 6 December 1954 (aged 69); Orange, New South Wales, Australia
- Source: ESPNcricinfo, 23 December 2016

Gordon Black (19 January 1885 – 6 December 1954) was an Australian cricketer. He played one first-class match for London County in 1903 and one match for New South Wales in 1903/04.

== See also ==
- List of London County Cricket Club players
- List of New South Wales representative cricketers
