= Christian Tindall =

English cricketer and civil servant

Personal information
- Full name: Christian Tindall
- Born: 18 May 1878; Leighton Buzzard, Bedfordshire, England
- Died: 13 April 1951 (aged 72); Littleham, Devon, England
- Batting: Unknown

Domestic team information
- Years: Team
- 1904: London County

Career statistics
Competition	First-class
Matches	1
Runs scored	10
Batting average	10.00
100s/50s	–/–
Top score	9*
Catches/stumpings	–/–
- Source: Cricinfo, 30 December 2021

Christian Tindall CIE (18 May 1878 – 13 April 1951) was an English officer in the Indian Civil Service and first-class cricketer.

The son of John Tindall, he was born at Leighton Buzzard in May 1878. Tindall joined the civil service in October 1902, later being appointed to the Indian Civil Service in British India, where he rose in rank to become to secretary to the Government of Bengal. He was appointed a Companion of the Order of the Indian Empire in the 1919 New Year Honours. A keen cricketer, Tindall played first-class cricket in 1904 for London County, captained by W. G. Grace, in one match against Cambridge University at Fenner's. Batting twice in the match, he ended the London County first innings unbeaten on 9, while in their second innings he was dismissed for a single run by John Hopley. In later life he took an interest in the Codex Sinaiticus, publishing research on the subject. Toward the end of his life he was resident in Exeter with his wife, Elsie. Elsie was killed in the Second World War during an air raid on the city in 1943. Tindall lived out his final years in the Devon village of Littleham, where he died in April 1951.
