= Harry Wrathall =

English cricketer

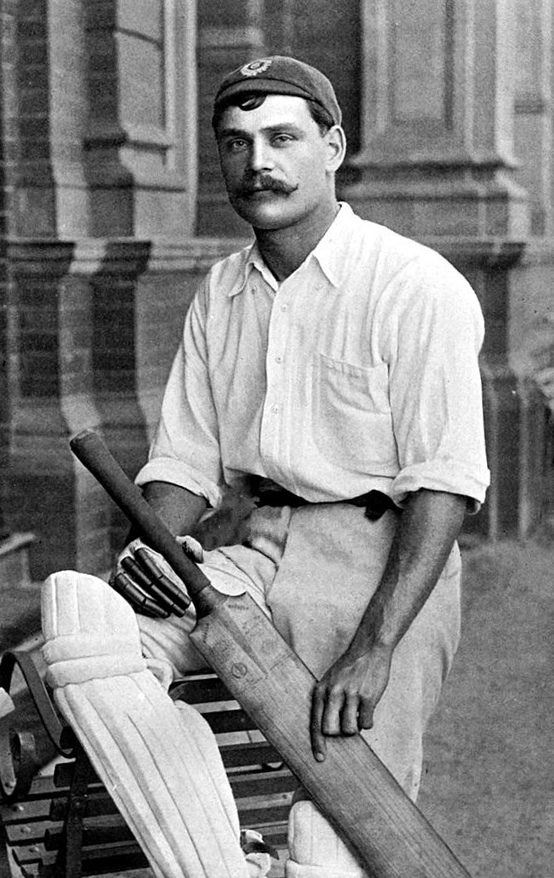
- Wrathall pictured in the 1890s

Personal information
- Born: 1 February 1869; Cheltenham, Gloucestershire, England
- Died: 1 June 1944 (aged 75); Salisbury, Wiltshire, England
- Batting: Right-handed
- Bowling: Right-arm medium

Domestic team information
- Years: Team
- 1894–1907: Gloucestershire
- 1896–1907: MCC
- 1900: London County

Career statistics
Competition	First-class
Matches	288
Runs scored	11,023
Batting average	22.54
100s/50s	9/47
Top score	176
Balls bowled	1,991
Wickets	30
Bowling average	45.26
5 wickets in innings	0
10 wickets in match	0
Best bowling	4/37
Catches/stumpings	194/3
- Source: CricketArchive, 13 July 2012

Harry Wrathall (1 February 1869 – 1 June 1944) was an English cricketer who played for Gloucestershire, Marylebone and London County.

== Career ==
Between 1894 and 1907, Wrathall played in 288 first-class matches. The right handed batsman played 509 innings with an average of 22.54. Wrathall's right-arm medium pace bowling took 30 wickets averaging at 45.26.
