= William Smith (cricketer, born 1875) =

English cricketer

Personal information
- Full name: William Smith
- Born: 11 February 1875; Witney, Oxfordshire, England
- Died: 20 March 1942 (aged 67); Chittlehamholt, Devon, England
- Batting: Right-handed

Domestic team information
- Years: Team
- 1895–1905: Oxfordshire
- 1901–1904: London County

Career statistics
Competition	First-class
Matches	30
Runs scored	1,191
Batting average	30.53
100s/50s	2/7
Top score	143
Balls bowled	108
Wickets	2
Bowling average	33.50
5 wickets in innings	–
10 wickets in match	–
Best bowling	1/6
Catches/stumpings	17/–
- Source: Cricinfo, 25 June 2019

William Smith (11 February 1875 – 20 March 1942) was an English first-class cricketer.

Smith was born in February 1875 at Witney, Oxfordshire. He made his debut in minor counties cricket for Oxfordshire against Worcestershire in the 1895 Minor Counties Championship. Having impressed playing for Oxfordshire, he was selected by W. G. Grace to play for his London County team, making his debut in first-class cricket for the team against Cambridge University at Fenner's in 1901. In his first season for London County he averaged over 64, including making what would be his highest first-class score when he scored 143 against Cambridge University at Crystal Palace. He played first-class cricket for London County until 1904, making thirty appearances. He scored 1,191 runs in these matches, at an average of 30.53. He made three centuries and seven half centuries. Smith played minor counties cricket for Oxfordshire until 1905, making a total of 45 appearances in the Minor Counties Championship. He topped the Oxfordshire batting averages in 1901 and 1904. He died in March 1942 at Chittlehamholt, Devon.
