= George Gamble (cricketer) =

English cricketer

George Frederick Gamble (24 October 1877 – 27 July 1949) was an English first-class cricketer at the beginning of the 20th century.

Gamble was born at Leicester in 1877. He made his first-class debut for London County Cricket Club in 1900, playing against Surrey County Cricket Club at Crystal Palace Park Cricket Ground in a team which included WG Grace and CB Fry. Primarily a left-arm bowler, Gamble played another two first-class matches for the side in 1903.

He played eight more first-class matches, all during the 1906 season for Surrey. In total Gamble took 26 wickets in his first-class career, including one five-wicket haul. He played Lancashire League for Burnley Cricket Club in 1919. Burnley's intended professional for the 1919 season had been George Thompson, but he withdrew on medical advice just before the season began: Gamble was a stopgap replacement, but the local newspaper detailed a long and successful career as a professional in club cricket as well as his first-class experience, citing more than 270 wickets in two seasons for London County, over 160 wickets in a single season for Eastbourne Cricket Club, a period playing for Woodbrook C. C. in Ireland and an appointment as the head ground bowler at the Marylebone Cricket Club at Lord's in 1914 that was curtailed only by his war service.

Gamble died at Leicester in 1949. He was aged 71.
