= Sidney Tindall =

English cricketer

Sidney Maguire Tindall (18 February 1867 – 19 September 1922) was an English cricketer active from 1894 to 1901 who played for Lancashire and London County. He was born in Margate and died in Sydney. He appeared in 56 first-class matches as a righthanded batsman who scored 1,304 runs with a highest score of 86 and held 24 catches. He took two wickets with a best analysis of one for 11.
