= Harold Burton =

Harold Burton may refer to:

- Harold H. Burton (1888–1964), American politician and lawyer
- Harold W. Burton (1888–1969), American architect
- H. David Burton (born 1938), American, the 13th Presiding Bishop of The Church of Jesus Christ of Latter-day Saints

== See also ==
- Harry Burton (disambiguation)
