= Cecil Wood (English cricketer) =

English cricketer

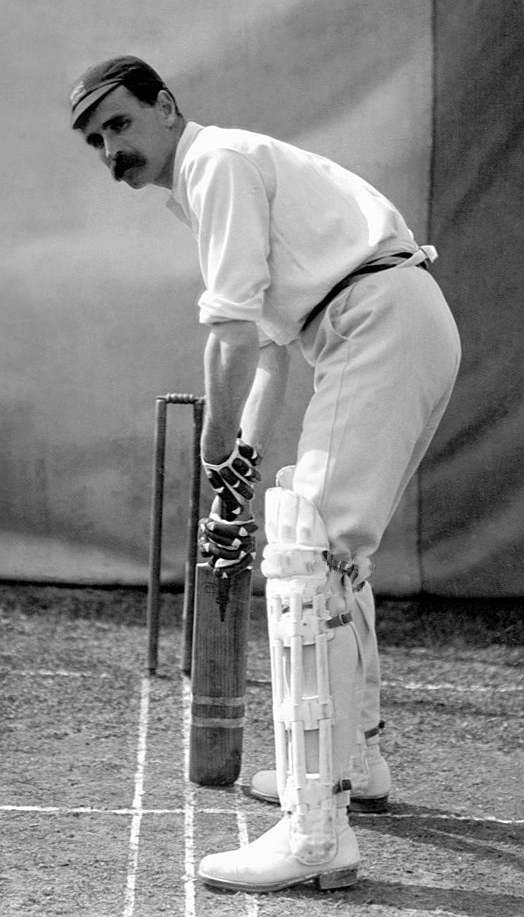
- Wood pictured in about 1905

Personal information
- Full name: Cecil John Burditt Wood
- Born: 21 November 1875; Semilang, Northampton, England
- Died: 5 June 1960 (aged 84); Leicester, England
- Batting: Right-handed
- Bowling: Right-arm slow

Domestic team information
- Years: Team
- 1896–1923: Leicestershire County Cricket Club
- 1900–1902: London County Cricket Club

Career statistics
Competition	First-class
Matches	456
Runs scored	23,879
Batting average	31.05
100s/50s	37/136
Top score	225
Balls bowled	12,064
Wickets	172
Bowling average	39.43
5 wickets in innings	3
10 wickets in match	0
Best bowling	6/79
Catches/stumpings	180/–
- Source: CricInfo, 23 April 2023

Cecil John Burditt Wood (21 November 1875 – 5 June 1960) was a first-class cricketer who played for Leicestershire County Cricket Club and London County Cricket Club. He is one of just six players in the first-class history to carry his bat twice in the same match.

Making his debut in 1896, he scored 23,879 runs as an opening batsman at an average of 31.05, made in 456 first-class matches. His best score was 225. He took 172 wickets with his right-arm slow bowling at 39.43 and took 180 catches in the field. He carried his bat through both innings against Yorkshire County Cricket Club at Bradford in 1911, and completed the feat 17 times in all. He hit 1,000 runs in a season 13 times, going on to 2,000 runs in 1901.

A coal merchant by trade, Wood also captained Leicestershire in a career which ultimately spanned to 1923. He was the Leicestershire Secretary in 1940 and 1941.

He was also a notable football player, playing for Leicester Fosse and Ashford United.

He died in 1960, aged 84.
