= Alexander Kermode =

Australian cricketer (1876–1934)

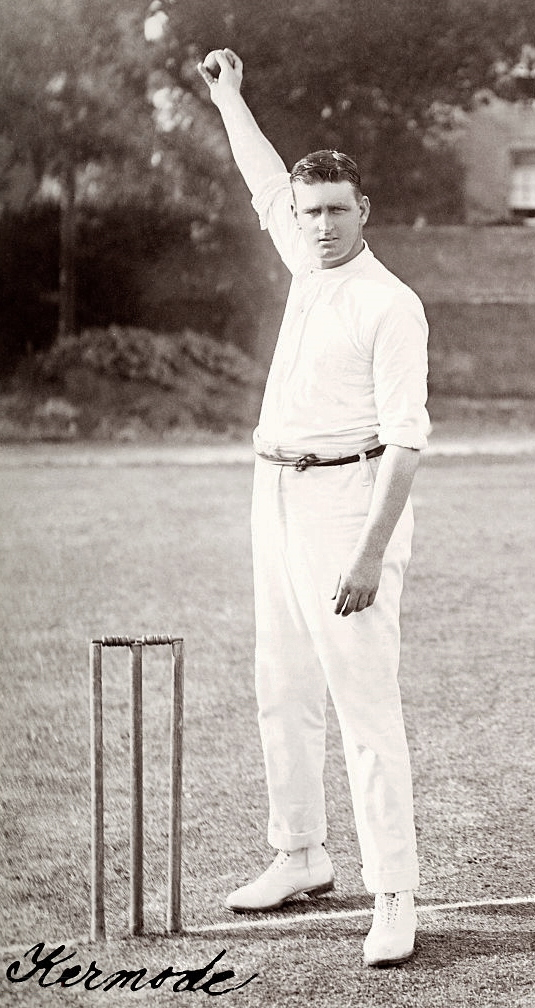

Personal information
- Born: 15 May 1876; Sydney, Australia
- Died: 17 July 1934 (aged 58); Sydney, Australia
- Batting: Right-handed
- Bowling: Right-arm fast-medium
- Role: Bowler

Domestic team information
- Years: Team
- 1901-02: New South Wales
- 1902 to 1908: Lancashire
- 1903: London County

Career statistics
Competition	First-class
Matches	80
Runs scored	681
Batting average	8.01
100s/50s	0/2
Top score	64
Balls bowled	7825
Wickets	340
Bowling average	23.01
5 wickets in innings	21
10 wickets in match	3
Best bowling	7/44
Catches/stumpings	33/–
- Source: Cricinfo

Alexander Kermode (15 May 1876 – 17 July 1934) was an Australian cricketer active from 1901 to 1908 who played for New South Wales, London County and Lancashire.

Kermode was born in Sydney. He appeared in 80 first-class matches as a right-arm fast-medium bowler and right-handed tail-end batsman. He took 340 wickets with a best analysis of seven for 44, and scored 681 runs with a highest score of 64* and held 33 catches. He played as the professional for Bacup in the Lancashire League from 1910 to 1914.

Kermode died at his home in the Sydney suburb of Balmain in July 1934 after a long illness. He left a widow and a married daughter.
