= Ernest Beldam =

English cricketer (1879–1958)

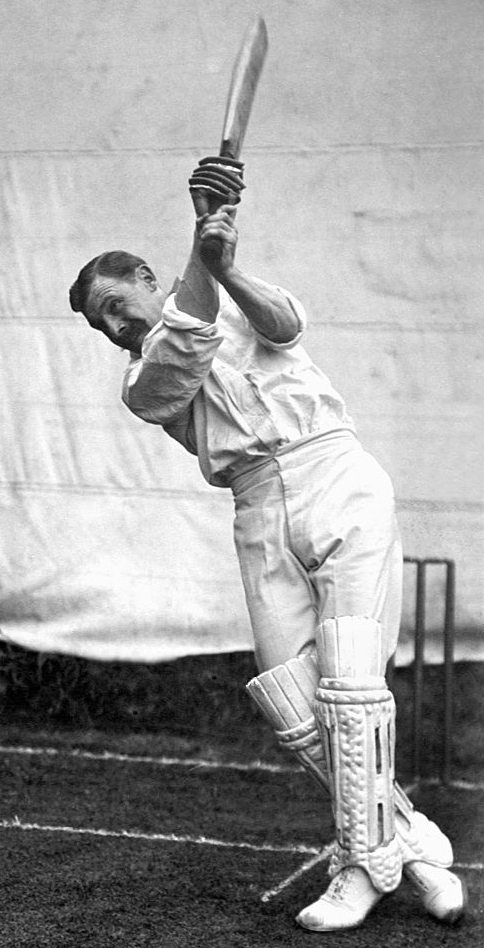

Personal information
- Born: 30 June 1879; Brentford, Middlesex, England
- Died: 28 November 1958 (aged 79); Horsell, Surrey, England

Career statistics
| Competition | First-class |
|---|---|
| Matches | 39 |
| Runs scored | 1225 |
| Batting average | 21.12 |
| 100s/50s | 1/6 |
| Top score | 105 |
| Balls bowled | – |
| Wickets | – |
| Bowling average | – |
| 5 wickets in innings | – |
| 10 wickets in match | – |
| Best bowling | – |
| Catches/stumpings | 19/0 |
- Source: Cricinfo, 1 June 2018

Ernest Asplan Beldam (30 June 1879 – 28 November 1958) was an English cricketer. He played 39 first-class matches for Middlesex between 1903 and 1907. His cousins Cyril Beldam and George Beldam were also cricketers.

== See also ==
- List of Middlesex County Cricket Club players
