= Edgar Ford =

English cricketer

Personal information
- Full name: Edgar Samuel Ford
- Born: 20 May 1876; Bradford-on-Avon, Wiltshire, England
- Died: 11 April 1943 (aged 66); Cranmore, Isle of Wight, England
- Batting: Unknown
- Role: Wicket-keeper

Domestic team information
- Years: Team
- 1899–1903: Wiltshire
- 1902: London County

Career statistics
Competition	First-class
Matches	1
Runs scored	0
Batting average	–
100s/50s	–/–
Top score	0*
Catches/stumpings	–/1
- Source: Cricinfo, 27 June 2019

Edgar Samuel Ford (20 May 1876 – 11 April 1943) was an English first-class cricketer.

Ford was born at Bradford-on-Avon in May 1876. He made his debut for Wiltshire in minor counties cricket in the 1899 Minor Counties Championship. He played minor counties cricket for Wiltshire until 1903, making a total of 23 appearances in the Minor Counties Championship. He made a single appearance in first-class cricket as a wicket-keeper when he played for London County against Leicestershire at Crystal Palace in 1902. He died at Cranmore on the Isle of Wight in April 1943.
