= George Beldam =

English cricketer and photographer

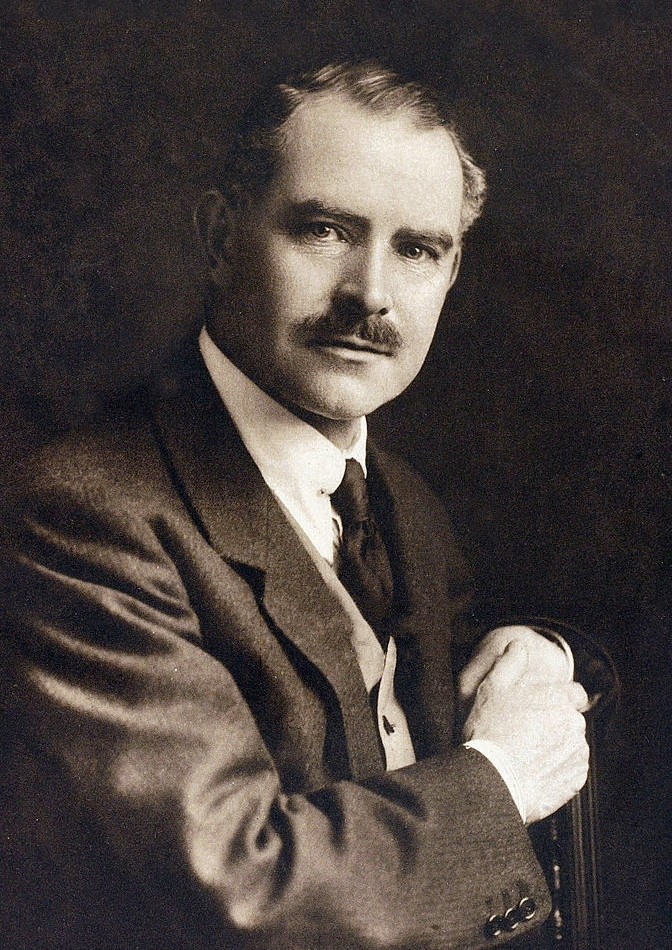

Personal information
- Full name: George William Beldam
- Born: 1 May 1868; New Cross, Kent, England
- Died: 23 November 1937 (aged 69); Lower Bourne, Farnham, Surrey, England
- Batting: Right-handed
- Bowling: Right-arm slow-medium

Domestic team information
- Years: Team
- 1900 to 1903: London County
- 1900 to 1907: Middlesex

Career statistics
Competition	First-class
Matches	142
Runs scored	6575
Batting average	30.02
100s/50s	9/33
Top score	155 not out
Balls bowled	7154
Wickets	107
Bowling average	30.63
5 wickets in innings	4
10 wickets in match	0
Best bowling	5/28
Catches/stumpings	83/0
- Source: Cricinfo, 6 November 2016

George William Beldam (1 May 1868 – 23 November 1937) was an English first-class cricketer and a pioneer of action photography in sport.

George Beldam was the eldest child of a family that was descended from seventeenth-century Huguenot refugees. He studied engineering at Peterhouse, Cambridge, before joining the family engineering company. He captained Peterhouse at cricket, football and tennis, and later played for Brentford F.C.

He was a steady right-handed batsman and a right-arm bowler who represented Middlesex, Marylebone Cricket Club (MCC) and London County in first-class cricket between 1900 and 1907. He scored 6,575 runs (average 30.02) with a personal best of 155* against Surrey at Lord's in 1902 and took 83 catches and 107 wickets (average 30.63) with a personal best of 5/28 versus Lancashire at Liverpool in 1902.

He became a noted artist and photographer. He was the first action photographer of sport in Britain, specialising in cricket and golf. He collaborated with C.B. Fry on two instructional books, Beldam providing the illustrations and some of the text:

- Great Batsmen: Their Methods at a Glance (1905)
- Great Bowlers and Fielders: Their Methods at a Glance (1907)

His brother, Cyril Beldam, and a cousin, Ernest Beldam, also played first-class cricket.

Beldam was a member of the committee that built and opened London's first public golf courses in Richmond Park, which were opened in 1923 and 1925.

A biography of him was written by a descendant:

- George Alastair Beldam, Third Man in: Lost World of a Camera Artist – G.W.Beldam and the Art of Edwardian Cricket, The George Beldam Collection, 1995, ISBN 978-0-9516676-0-6

Beldam married three times. He left his first wife, Gertrude, and married the much younger Margaret Underwood in 1921, then in turn left Margaret and married the even younger Christina in 1930. All three marriages produced children. He and Christina lived on 24 acres near Farnham in Surrey. He died of a heart attack in 1937. His son by his second marriage, Roy Beldam (1925–2020), became a barrister and a High Court judge.

== Cited sources ==
- Gideon Haigh (2016) Stroke of Genius: Victor Trumper and the Shot that Changed Cricket, Hamish Hamilton, Melbourne, ISBN 1471146804.
