= Guy Mainwaring Morton =

English barrister and crime novelist, wrote as Peter Traill

Guy Mainwaring Morton (1896–1968) was a barrister and writer who wrote crime novels under the pen name of Peter Traill.

He married Clare, the daughter of the Hartlepool ship-owner M.H. Horsley, in 1923.

== Selected publications ==
=== Novels ===
- Woman to Woman (1924)
- Memory's Geese (1924)
- The Divine Spark (1926)
- Under the Cherry Tree (1926)
- The White Hen (1927)
- Some Take a Lover (1928)
- The Life Fashionable (1929)
- Great Dust (1932)
- Here Lies Love (1932)
- The Angel (1934)
- Carry Me Home (1934)
- Red, Green and Amber (1935)
- Half Mast (1936)
- The Sleeve of Night (1937)
- Not Proven (1938)
- Six of One (1938)
- Golden Oriole (1940)
- The Wedding of the Jackal (1943)
- No Farthing Richer (1944)
- The Deceiving Mirror (1946)
- Under the Plane Trees (1947)
- Midnight Oil (1947)
- So Sits the Turtle (1948)
- The Portly Peregrine (1948)
- Caravanseral (1949)
- The Singing Apple (1949)
- Wings of Tomorrow (1950)
- Mutation Mink (1950)
- The Rope of Sand (1951)
- French Dressing (1952)

=== Plays ===
- Fallen Angels (1924) - with Michael Morton
- After the Theatre (1924) - with Michael Morton
- By Right of Conquest (1925) - with Michael Morton
- Salvage (1926) - with Michael Morton
- The Stranger in the House (1928) - with Michael Morton
- Because of Irene (1929) - with Michael Morton
- Tread Softly (1936)
