= James Todd (cricketer) =

English cricketer

Personal information
- Full name: James Henry Todd
- Born: 16 December 1867; Forest Hill, Kent, England
- Died: 11 August 1956 (aged 88); Marylebone, London, England
- Batting: Right-handed

Domestic team information
- Years: Team
- 1901: London County

Career statistics
Competition	First-class
Matches	3
Runs scored	66
Batting average	11.00
100s/50s	–/–
Top score	24
Catches/stumpings	6/–
- Source: Cricinfo, 31 August 2019

James Henry Todd (16 December 1867 – 11 August 1956) was an English first-class cricketer.

Todd was born in December 1867 at Forest Hill, Kent. Todd made his debut in first-class cricket for London County against Leicestershire at Leicester in 1901. He later made two further appearances in first-class cricket in 1906, for W. G. Grace's personal XI against the touring West Indians and Cambridge University, with both matches played at Crystal Palace. In his three first-class matches, Todd scored a total of 66 runs with a high score of 24. Todd died at Marylebone in August 1956.
