= SS Mobile =

Cargo steamship built in England

History

United Kingdom
- Name: Mobile
- Namesake: Mobile
- Owner: G Horsley & Son, West Hartlepool
- Port of registry: West Hartlepool
- Builder: Furness, Withy, Middleton, Hartlepool
- Yard number: 219
- Launched: 4 November 1895
- Completed: December 1895
- Identification: UK official number 102737; code letters PDNH
- Fate: Missing on or after 28 December 1900

General characteristics
- Type: Cargo ship
- Tonnage: 3,341 GRT, 2,183 NRT
- Length: 340.0 ft (103.6 m)
- Beam: 44.9 ft (13.7 m)
- Depth: 25.8 ft (7.9 m)
- Installed power: 292 NHP
- Propulsion: triple-expansion engine
- Sail plan: schooner
- Crew: 26

SS Mobile was a cargo steamship that was built in England in 1895 and lost with all hands in 1900. Furness, Withy & Co Ltd of Middleton, Hartlepool launched her on 4 November 1895 and completed her that December. G Horsley & Son of West Hartlepool owned ad operated her.

On 27 December 1900 Mobile sailed from Mobile, Alabama bound for Bremen, Germany with a cargo including cotton, cotton seed meal and grain in her holds, cotton in her deckhouses and pitch pine and poplar timber as deck cargo. On 28 December she bunkered at Fort Morgan and dropped her US pilot. She was not seen again, and by 19 February 1901 she was listed as 26 days overdue.

The Board of Trade held a Court of Inquiry at West Hartlepool on 20 and 21 June 1901. The Court concluded that Mobile was in good condition and the deadweight of her cargo was not excessive. However, the Court concluded that she was carrying too much on deck, including about 700 tons of timber and an extra 41 tons of coal. This compromised her stability, and she probably foundered in bad weather.
