= Newman Norman =

English cricketer

Newman Frederick Norman (2 February 1884 – 28 August 1954) was an English cricketer active from 1902 to 1909 who played for London County and Northamptonshire (Northants).

Norman was born in Camberwell, and appeared in 18 first-class matches as a righthanded batsman who scored 258 runs with a highest score of 32. He died in Westcliff-on-Sea, aged 70.
