= Henry Burton (cricketer) =

English cricketer

Henry Herbert Burton (27 March 1874 – 4 February 1964) was an English first-class cricketer active 1904–05 who played for Surrey and London County. He was born in Lambeth and died in Streatham.

Burton married Mary Elizabeth Ehrmann (21 January 1883 – 16 November 1957), daughter of German immigrants who were bakers. They had seven children, Henry (who served for the Royal British Army during WW2 and was a POW under the Japanese working on the Death Railway), Bernard, Kathelen, Gwyn, Son, Ronald, and Joan.
