= Gilbert Horseley =

English pirate, active 1570s

Captain Gilbert Horseley
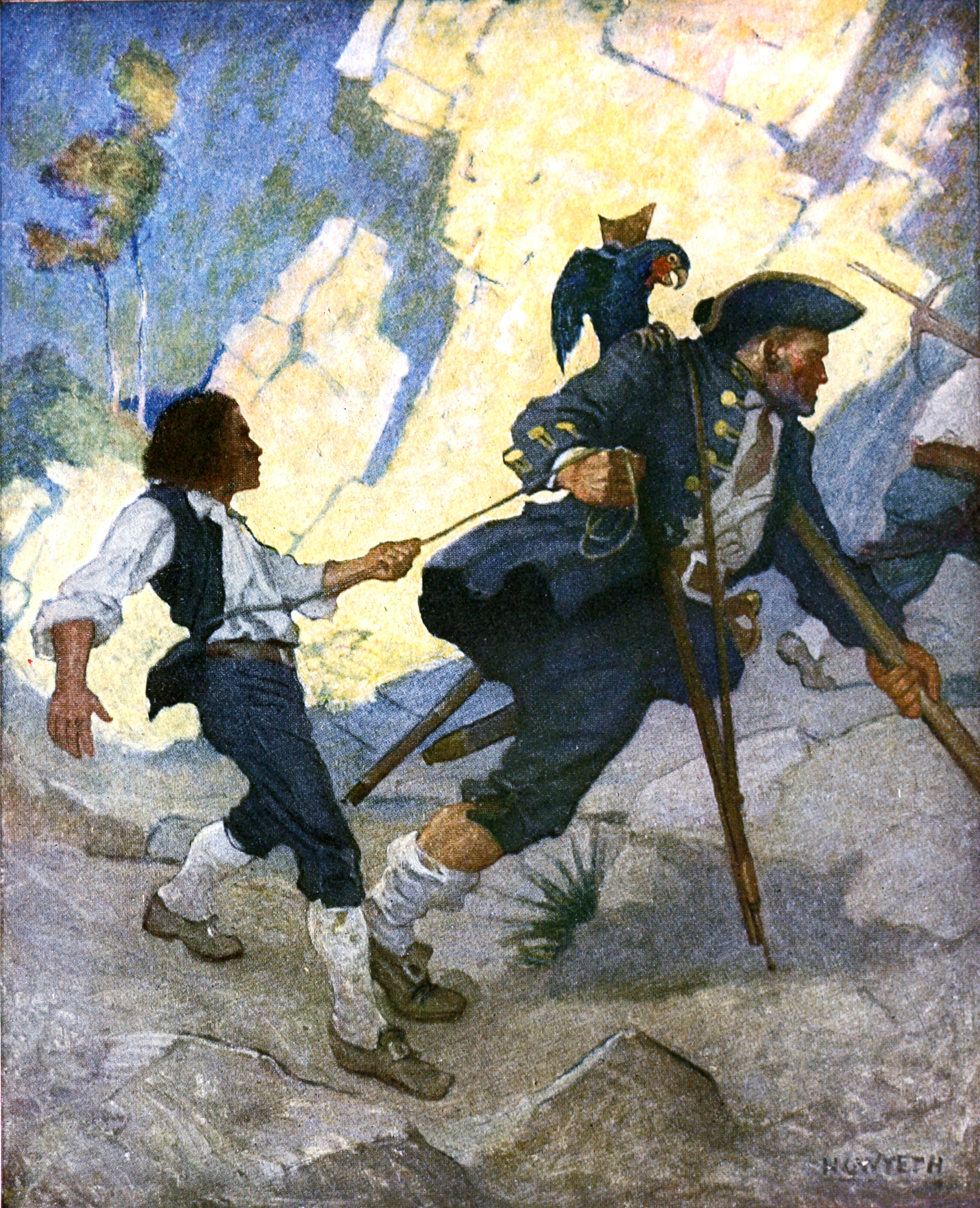
- Stereotypical English pirate
- Other name: Gilbert Horsley
- Known for: Raiding Veragua (Note: Also Veraguas. From Cape Gracias a Dios to Rio Belen. Had a de jure overlap with the Mosquito Shore to the north.) and Spanish Honduras; Ascending the San Juan River
- Opponents: Diego de Herrera (Note: The governor of Spanish Hondruas.); Diego López (Note: A lieutenant of Truxillo.)
- Partner: Sylvester (Note: Also Sylvestre. A French corsair. Not yet identified by the 1990s.)
- Piratical career
- Type: English pirate or sea dog
- Allegiance: England
- Years active: 1574–1575
- Rank: Captain
- Base of operations: Mosquito Gulf; Bay of Honduras
- Commands: John

Gilbert Horseley (Note: Also Horsley for surname.) (fl. 1574–1575) was an English pirate or privateer who led raids against the Spanish in various settlements and ports of Veragua and Spanish Honduras, in the western Caribbean shores of what is now Central America. Horseley departed from Plymouth on the pinnace John (25 crew) in late 1574, and returned on the same in mid-1575, now laden with rich plunder that cost the crew ten men. In Veragua, Horseley sought and gained the aid of local maroons, and in consort with French corsair Sylvester, set about seizing merchant ships and raiding settlements, and apparently had much luck, though this allegedly cost many victims their lives. In Honduras, the captain failed to sack Truxillo, but still managed to accrue a respectable booty elsewhere in the encompassing bay. Horseley has been noted in specialist literature for his and Sylvester's successful ascent of the San Juan River.

== Career ==
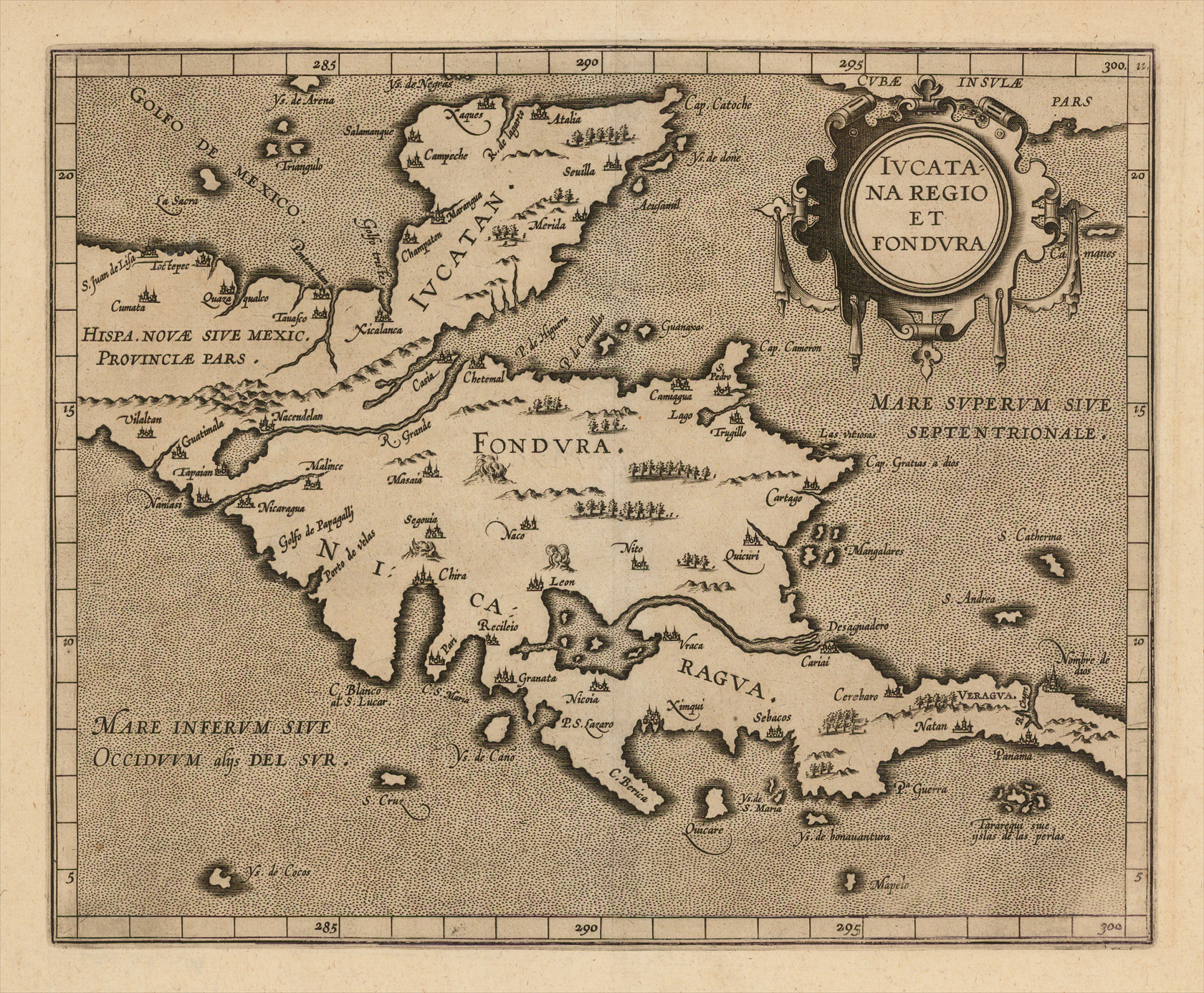
Veragua (bottom right) and Spanish Honduras ('Fondura', centre) in the 16th century

In 1574, French corsair Sylvester set sail from Le Havre, Upper Normandy in September, on a vessel carrying one hundred fighting men, and made landfall in the Spanish territory of Veragua that December, where he sought out and located some friendly maroons, who advised him of laden Spanish merchant ships currently lying in port in the Desaguadero, at the mouth of the San Juan River, north of his landing site but still within the Mosquito Gulf. At some point during the next few months, in early 1575, Sylvester was joined by Elizabethan sea dog or pirate Gilbert Horseley, captain of the pinnace John (Note: A zabra to the Spanish, who later described her as "a fast vessel [of] medium size ... with 22 harquebuses, and seven pieces of artillery, large and small; an immense supply of arrows, much war material, and all in very good order".) (25 tonnes, 17 hands). The John had cleared from Plymouth, Devon in November with a crew of 25 at first, but she lost eight of them during a fatal engagement with a Spanish vessel (50 tonnes) off the Barbary Coast. Here, Horseley likewise got in touch with the Sem Rownes (maroons), and consorted with them and Sylvester to embark on a joint expedition to the Desaguadero.

=== Expedition ===
In short order, the pirates sighted the mouth of the San Juan, their crews now augmented with some maroons and a Portuguese pilot (Luis Marquês), and finding no ships in the Desaguadero, entered the river, intending to reach Granada so as to sack the Spanish city. At some point prior to their destination, though, they came upon some Spanish frigates laden with goods, and seized them. This booty apparently proved rich enough for both crews, as Horseley and Sylvester now desisted from their river quest and turned back out to open sea, then due south. According to Spanish sources collected by historian Irene A. Wright, once back in Veragua, "acts of exceptional and cowardly cruelty were committed" as the pirates reportedly killed "many people, cutting their throats", and "committed great robberies and insults". This done, Sylvester and Horseley parted ways, with the latter sailing north to the Bay of Honduras.

==== Honduran leg ====
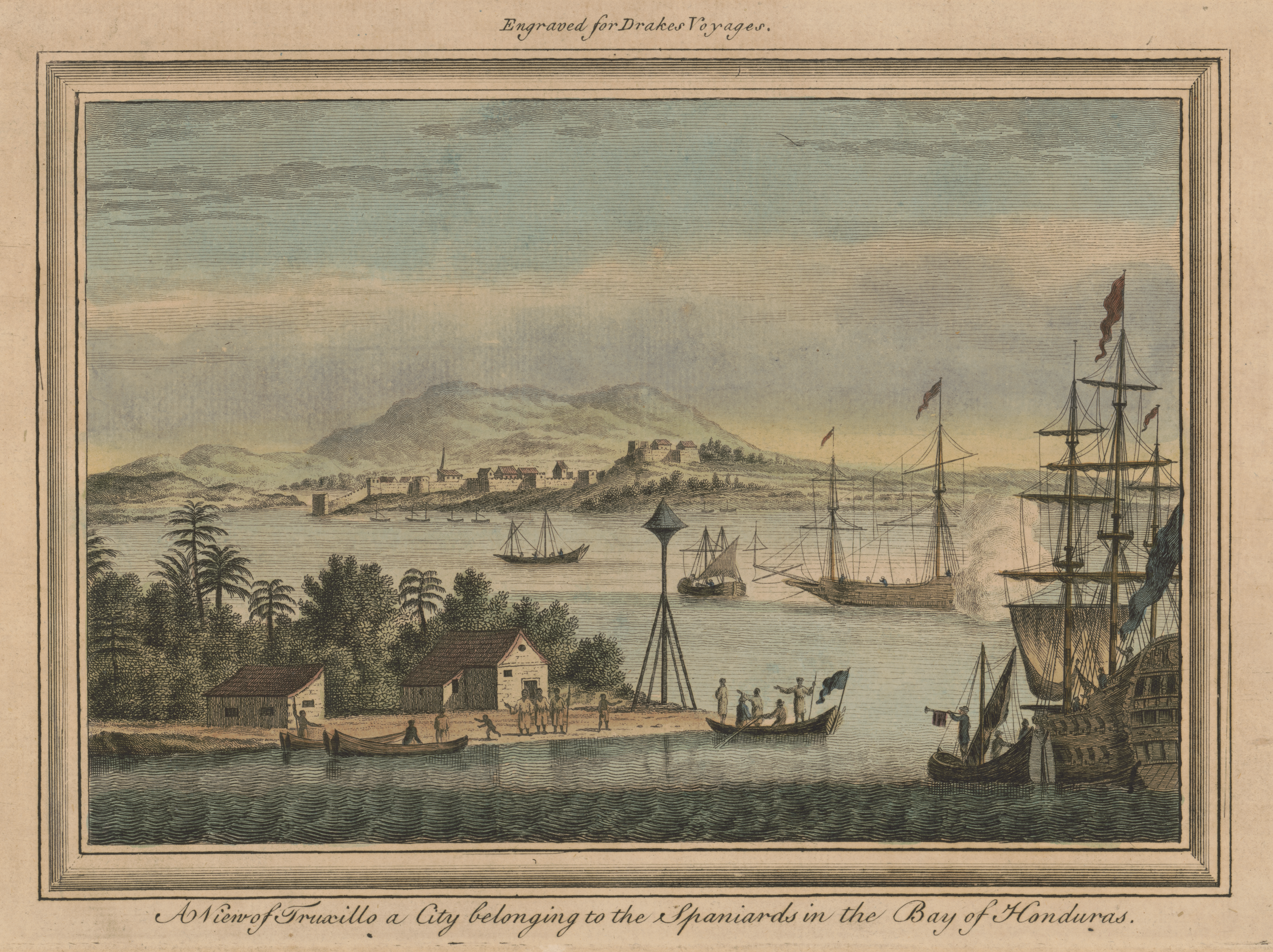
Truxillo bay and city in the 16th century (engraved in the 18th century)

The John rounded Cape Gracias a Dios and so entered Honduran waters on the evening of 2 April 1575, and made a quiet landfall at Cape Honduras, (Note: Also Cape of Honduras, Cabo de Honduras, Punta Caxinas. In Cabo Honduras. Current site of Puerto Castilla. Not Cape Camaron, which is further east of this headland.) some three leguas distant from Truxillo, which Horseley intended to raid. At about the middle of that night, the crew packed themselves into a launch boat and surreptitiously stole towards the Spanish port, but were soon sighted by a keen-eyed lookout from Fort Santa Barbara, who immediately sounded the alarm. The roused vecinos rushed to organise the defence, which proved formidable enough to convince the pirates to abort their raid. Horseley made a hasty retreat whilst under fire from the fort, and still managed to seize a Spanish frigate lying in Truxillo's harbour.

At the break of dawn, on 3 April, the pirates set out west to Porto Caballos in the stolen frigate, most likely "to pillage the port and the ships which were there", but were again spotted from Santa Barbara. This time, the vecinos of Truxillo opted simply to warn Porto Caballos of the coming pirates, by having a swift shallop overtake the frigate, but their plan was foiled some 20 leagues into said trip, when the English took notice and captured the shallop. By midday, Horseley had still not entered port, and was instead coasting the frigate bit by bit, apparently so as to chart the Honduran coastline to Amatique Bay. That afternoon, the crew hijacked yet another Spanish merchant vessel (owned by Juan Antonio and laden with treasure worth over 3,000 ducats), seemingly tortured her company (for gold and sailing directions), and then boarded the John and her launch to carry on to the Spanish port. Horseley next sighted two Spanish merchant ships (Martín Monte and Vicencio Garullo captains) off Triunfo de la Cruz, (Note: Also El Triunfo de la Cruz. A small headland in the Bay of Tela, off modern Tela.) and likewise attempted to take them, but was successfully rebuffed with heavy artillery fire.

By nightfall on 5 April, the John had made it to Cape Camaron, 20 leagues east of Truxillo, where she was watered. Here, two Spanish detainees from prior engagements managed to get off the pinnace and successfully flee their captivity. They reported that Horseley had sworn to "return another year with a greater force".

=== Return and aftermath ===
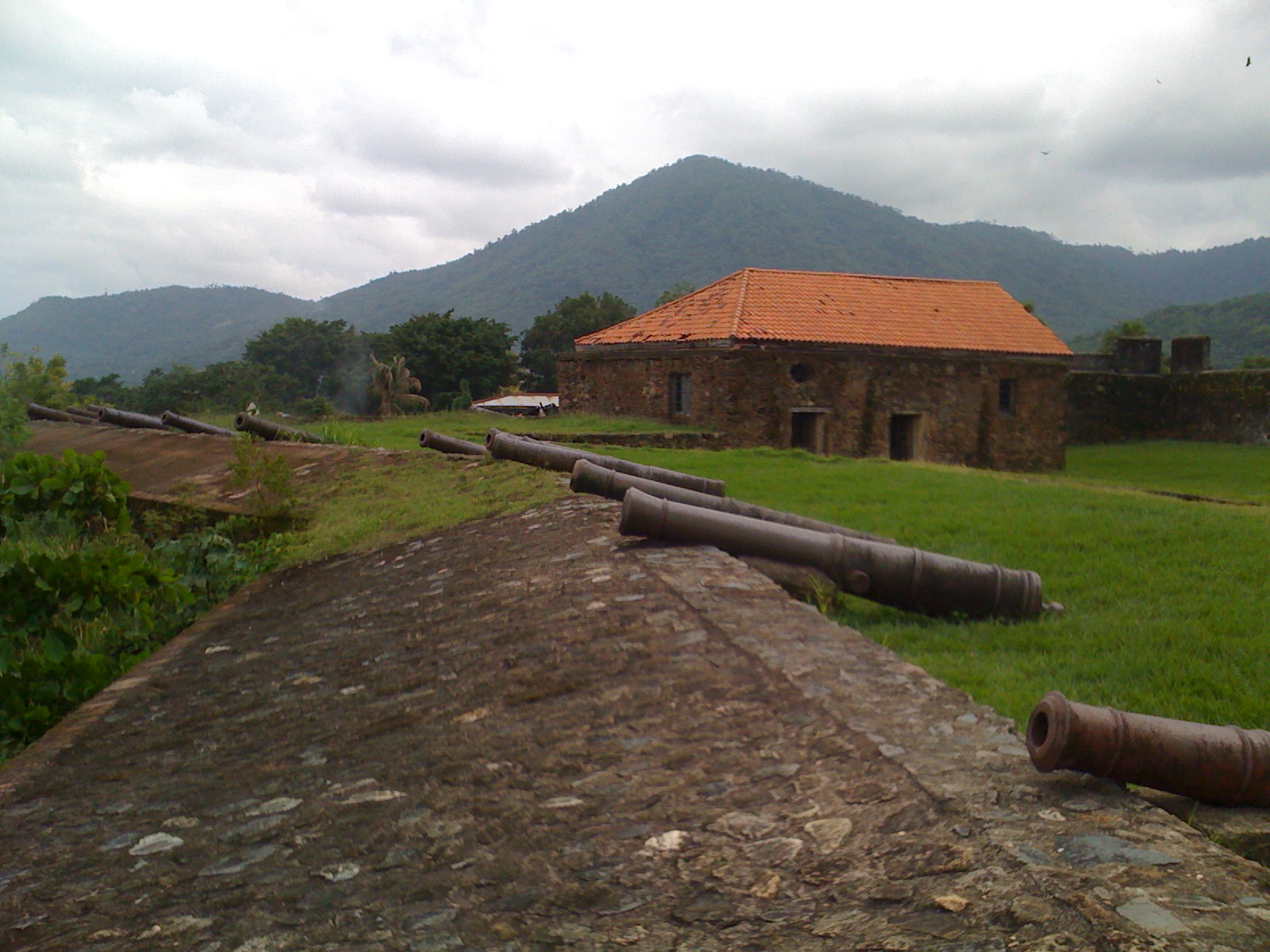
Plugged cannons on the rampart of the now-decommissioned Fort Santa Barbara

A "now passably rich" Horseley arrived at Plymouth with fifteen of his men in June 1575. He carried on to Arundel, West Sussex to offload his treasure "without causing unwelcome interest". In their account of Horseley's incursion to the Spanish crown, dated Truxillo, 20 May 1575, lieutenant Diego López reported, "this city has felt these robberies keenly, and is cast down because it lacked means to offend any enemy ... since your majesty has ordered me to serve in this port and to guard and defend it, I humbly entreat your majesty to order me to be provided with the means, and forces for the task ... This miserable city ... so afflicted, and frequently attacked by enemies, is now without resources, and what is accomplished, is done by main strength". The crown commended Lopez for his service, and regarding the requested aid for Truxillo's defence, gave instructions to the presiding officer of the Real Audiencia of Guatemala "concerning money" for said defence, and to colonial authorities (Note: Likely Council of the Indies or Casa de Contratacion.) in Seville "concerning artillery" for the same.

== Legacy ==
According to Wright and Newcastle University historian Peter T. Bradley, Horseley's upstream navigation of the San Juan River (with Sylvester) might not unfairly be deemed "daring" or "comparable to Drake's most daring exploits", given its success, the John's small size and crew, and the inherent dangers of sailing too far into such a waterway ("unlike the sea, [the San Juan] kept no safe retreat open").

== See also ==
- John Noble – raided Veragua in 1574
- Drake's expedition – to Veragua in 1573
- Piracy in the Bay of Honduras

== Notes and references ==
=== References ===
1. Andrews, Kenneth R., ed. (1958). English privateering voyages to the West Indies, 1588-1595 : documents relating to English voyages to the West Indies from the defeat of the armada to the last voyage of Sir Francis Drake. Works issued by the Hakluyt Society; 2nd ser., no. 111 (1st ed.). Cambridge: Published for the Hakluyt Society at the University Press. hdl:2027/mdp.39015026881832. OCLC 504851.
2. Bradley, Peter T. (1999). British maritime enterprise in the New World : from the late fifteenth to the mid-eighteenth century. Studies in British history; v. 57 (1st ed.). Lewiston, NY: Edwin Mellen Press. hdl:2027/mdp.39015054149409. ISBN 9780773478664. OCLC 42290563.
3. De la O Torres, Rodrigo Alejandro (November 2014). DE CORSARIOS, MARES Y COSTAS: EL CORSO EN LA CONSTRUCCIÓN DEL ESPACIO GOLFO-CARIBE. 1527-1620 (PhD). Mérida, Yuc.: Centro de Investigaciones y Estudios Superiores en Antropología Social.
4. De la O Torres, Rodrigo Alejandro (January–June 2016). "La presencia de corsarios franceses en el Golfo-Caribe entre 1536-1566 : una propuesta de análisis espacial". Historia 2.0: Conocimiento Histórico en Clave Digital. 6 (11): 36–56. ISSN 2027-9035.
5. De la O Torres, Rodrigo Alejandro (July–December 2019). "Miedos y fenómeno de la piratería en el Golfo-Caribe durante el siglo XVI. Un ensayo de aproximación". Historelo revista de historia regional y local. 11 (2): 267–300. doi:10.15446/historelo.v11n22.73263. ISSN 2145-132X. S2CID 198778698.
6. De la O Torres, Rodrigo Alejandro (2020). DE CORSARIOS, MARES Y COSTAS : El corso en la construcción del espacio y experiencias marítimas en el Golfo-Caribe, 1527-1620 (1st ed.). Ciudad Universitaria, Aguascalientes: Universidad Autónoma de Aguascalientes. OCLC 1280054563.
7. Gasteazoro, Carlos Manuel; Araúz, Calestino Andrés; Muñoz Pinzón, Armando (1980). Tabla cronológica : (de hechos históricos, políticos, sociales, económicos, culturales y científicos) (1st ed.). Panamá: Lotería Nacional de Beneficencia. OCLC 12830207.
8. Figueroa, Alejandro J.; Johnson, Erlend; Goodwin, Whitney A., eds. (2021). Southeastern Mesoamerica : indigenous interaction, resilience, and change (1st ed.). Louisville, Colorado: University Press of Colorado. OCLC 1226797442.
9. Hakluyt, Richard, ed. (1600). The principal nauigations, voiages, traffiques and discoueries of the English nation made by sea or ouer-land, to the remote and farthest distant quarters of the earth, at any time within the compasse of these 1500. yeeres: deuided into three seuerall volumes, according to the positions of the regions, whereunto they were directed. Vol. 3 (2nd expanded ed.). London: George Bishop, Ralfe Newberie, & Robert Barker. OCLC 252871354. ProQuest 2248550788.
10. Howgego, Raymond John (1958). To 1800: a comprehensive reference guide to the history and literature of exploration, travel, and colonization from the earliest times to the year 1800. Encyclopedia of exploration to 1800 : a comprehensive reference guide to the history and literature of exploration, travel, and colonization from the earliest times to the year 1800 (1st ed.). Potts Point, N.S.W.: Hordern House. hdl:2027/mdp.49015002827245. ISBN 9781875567362. OCLC 52377840.
11. Marley, David F. (1998). Wars of the Americas : a chronology of armed conflict in the New World, 1492 to the present (1st ed.). Santa Barbara, CA: ABC-CLIO. hdl:2027/mdp.49015002845379. ISBN 9780874368376. OCLC 39024726.
12. Marley, David F. (2010). 1650-1685. Pirates of the Americas. Vol. 1 (1st ed.). Santa Barbara, CA: ABC-CLIO. OCLC 436030697.
13. Marley, David F. (2010). 1686-1725. Pirates of the Americas. Vol. 2 (1st ed.). Santa Barbara, CA: ABC-CLIO. OCLC 436030697.
14. Williamson, James A. (1927). Sir John Hawkins : the time and the man (1st ed.). Oxford: Clarendon Press. hdl:2027/mdp.39015027905218. OCLC 3075296.
15. Williamson, James A. (1938). The age of Drake. Pioneer histories, edited by V. T. Harlow ... And J. A. Williamson (1st ed.). London: Adam and Charles Black. hdl:2027/mdp.39015014588183. OCLC 1421005.
16. Winzerling, E. O. (1946). Beginning of British Honduras, 1506-1765 (1st ed.). New York: North River Press. OCLC 1892890.
17. Wright, Irene A., ed. (1929). Spanish documents concerning English voyages to the Caribbean, 1527-1568. Works issued by the Hakluyt Society; 2nd ser., no. 62 (1st ed.). London: Printed for the Hakluyt Society. OCLC 2092435.
18. Wright, Irene A., ed. (1932). Documents concerning English voyages to the Spanish main, 1569-1580. Works issued by the Hakluyt Society; 2nd ser., no. 71 (1st ed.). London: Printed for the Hakluyt Society. hdl:2027/mdp.39015012306133. OCLC 1476408.
19. Wright, Irene A., ed. (1951). Further English voyages to Spanish America, 1583-1594 : documents from the Archives of the Indies at Seville illustrating English voyages to the Caribbean, the Spanish Main, Florida, and Virginia. Works issued by the Hakluyt Society; 2nd ser., no. 99 (1st ed.). London: Printed for the Hakluyt Society. hdl:2027/mdp.39015026881790. OCLC 1476734.
