= Harry Whitehead =

English cricketer

Harry Whitehead (19 September 1874 – 14 September 1944) was an English cricketer active from 1898 to 1922 who played for Leicestershire. He was born in Barlestone and died in Leicester. He appeared in 382 first-class matches as a righthanded batsman who bowled right arm medium pace and sometimes kept wicket. He scored 15,112 runs with a highest score of 174 among fourteen centuries and took 106 wickets with a best performance of five for 80. He completed 409 catches.
