= Cyril Beldam =

English cricketer (1869–1940)

Cyril Asplan Beldam (15 October 1869 – 7 September 1940) was an English first-class cricketer active 1894–1900 who played for Middlesex. A brother of George Beldam, he was born in Northfleet; died in Marylebone.
