= Ron Horsley =

American writer and artist (born 1977)

Ron Horsley (born March 4, 1977) is an author and artist responsible for numerous short stories, essays, reviews, and book cover designs.

Born and raised in Columbus, Ohio, his first published work was as editor of and contributor to The Midnighters Club: Tales from the Harker House Collection, 2001. The collection included authors such as Paul G. Tremblay and Lucy Snyder, and several stories received recognition in the 2001 Bram Stoker Awards for Best Short Fiction.

His short stories have appeared in magazines such as On Spec and his story "In the Empty Country" appears in the Masques V anthology, edited and published by Barry Hoffman and Gary A. Braunbeck (originally edited by Jerry Wiliamson).

He is an alumnus of the 2002 Clarion Workshop for Science Fiction and Fantasy Writing and a recipient of the Douglas L. Ruble scholarship fund for science fiction writing and development.

His book cover designs have appeared on Gary A. Braunbeck's non-fiction collection, Fear in a Handful of Dust, and his time-travel collection, x3. He also designed the covers for both editions of The Midnighters Club anthology and Lucy A. Snyder's collection Blood Magic.

His first published novel, "Sin Gorge: An Everything Under Novel" was released in October 2012. The book is the first in the 'John Flicker' series of urban fantasy/horror novels featuring the protagonist John Flicker/Body & Soul, with later novels Jennyripper, (released June, 2013) The Never-Time Girl, (released October, 2014). According to his blog, he is currently working on the fourth installment, tentatively titled Taphoclave.

His first children's novel, Beyond the Grass Ocean, was released in March, 2016, with the sequel, The Nightly Train completed in December, 2016. The final book in his "World Trilogy," The Intrepid Boatsman, is currently under development.

Horsley and his wife reside in Columbus, Ohio. In August 2005 he was diagnosed with advanced Crohn's disease. In June 2008 he completed a Bachelor of Science degree in Graphic Design at the Art Institute of Las Vegas, after which he returned to his hometown of Columbus, Ohio. He is a graduate of the 2016 MFA program for Illustration at the Columbus College of Art and Design.

He currently works as a graphic designer in the Columbus, Ohio area, creating commissioned works for regional magazines such as ( 614) Magazine and Stock & Barrel as well as continuing his publishing projects.

== Publications/Recognition ==
- The Polyphase-Powered Man: As Recorded by the Firsthand Account of Nikola Tesla. Everything Under Press. 2017. ISBN 978-0990391036.
- The Virtuous: A Tale of Pon-Chai the Thiefkiller. Everything Under Press. 2017. ISBN 978-0990391012.
- Beyond the Grass Ocean: A Tale for Every Worldly Child. Everything Under Press. 2016. ISBN 978-0990391029.
- "Greener Grass: A children's author ends up learning a lesson while teaching them". (614) Magazine. 2016.
- Jennyripper. Everything Under Press. 2013. ISBN 978-0615831756.
- The Never-Time Girl: An Everything Under Novel. Everything Under Press. October 8, 2014. ISBN 978-0990391005.
- "Book Review – Modern Magic: Tales of Fantasy and Horror". Modern Magic. BookSpotCentral. 2006.
- HorrorWeb (2006). "Ron Horsley's "In the Empty Country" one of Masques V's standout tales". Masques V. HorrorWeb. Archived from the original on July 3, 2007.
- Locus Magazine (2003). "Cover Artists & Publications". "x3" & "Fear in a Handful of Dust". Locus Magazine.
- Locus Magazine (2003). "Short Story Publications 2003". ...And the Red Light was My Mind. Locus Magazine.
- Authors Den (2001). "The Midnighters Club". Infinity Publishing.
- Zone SF (2002). ""Rex Tempus"". "Rex Tempus" by Ron Horsley. Zone SF. Archived from the original on October 18, 2001.
- FeoAmante.com (2002). ""William Gagliani receives Honorable Mention for Midnighters Club story"". "Starbird" by William Gagliani. FeoAmante.com.
- Clarion Writers Workshop (2002). ""2002 Workshop Participants"". MSU.
- Masques V (2006). "Masques V edited by Jerry Wiliamson & Gary Braunbeck". "In the Empty Country" by Ron Horsley. Gauntlet Press. Archived from the original on November 17, 2007.
- William P Simmons & David Silva (2006). Vivisections. Catalyst Books.
- W. H. Horner (2006). "Modern Magic". "Joy, Unbottled" by Ron Horsley. Fantasist Entertainment. Archived from the original on March 13, 2006.
