= Harry Burton (Australian footballer) =

Australian rules footballer

Personal information
- Full name: Harry William Burton
- Born: 18 March 1887; Hawthorn, Victoria
- Died: 31 August 1972 (aged 85); Heidelberg, Victoria
- Original team: Hawthorn Rovers

Playing career^{1}
Years	Club	Games (Goals)
1910	Richmond	3 (1)
- ^{1} Playing statistics correct to the end of 1910.

Harry William Burton (18 March 1887 – 31 August 1972) was an Australian rules footballer who played with Richmond in the Victorian Football League (VFL).
