= Rupert Horsley =

English cricketer and educator

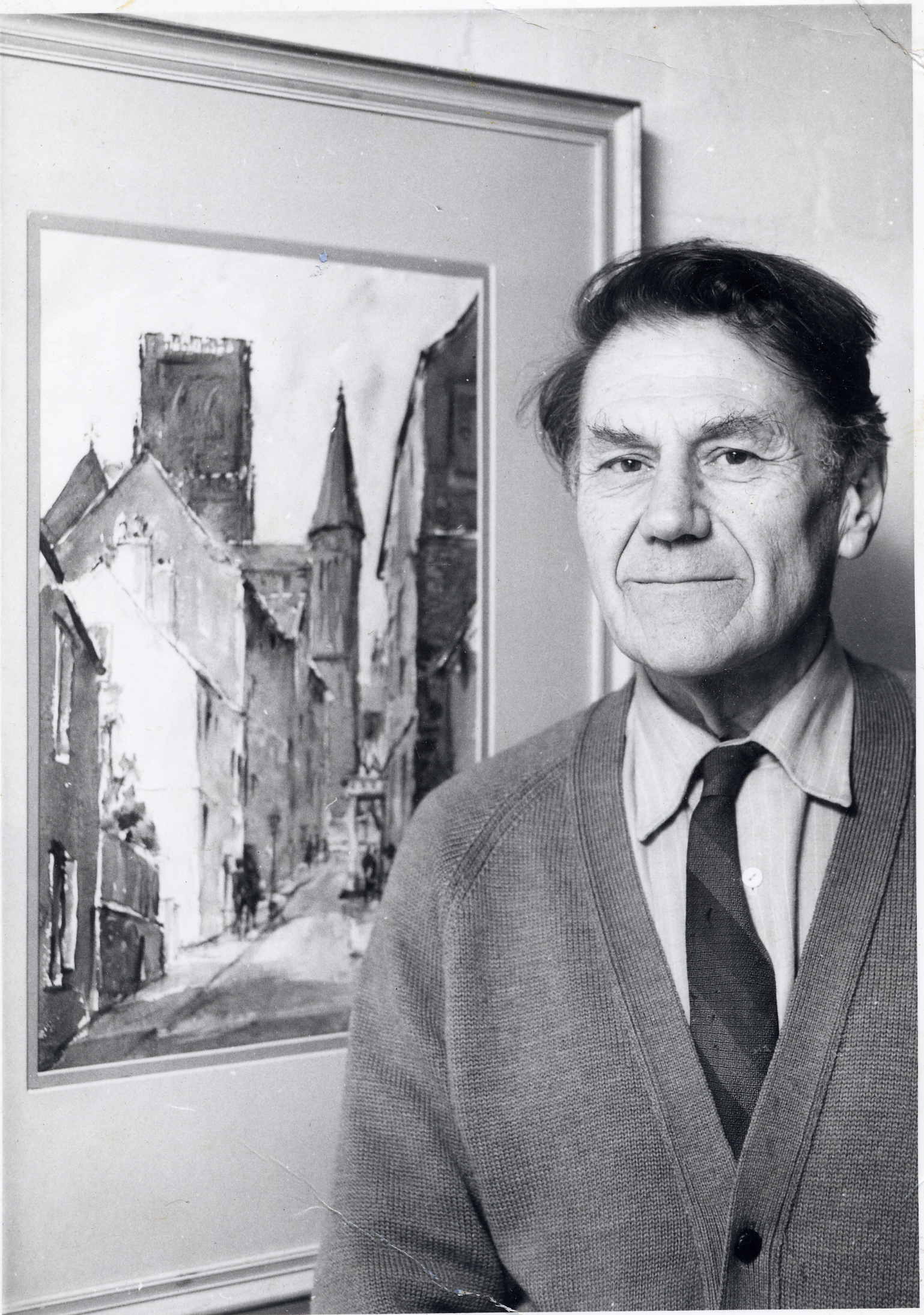
- At an exhibition of his paintings in Oxford

Personal information
- Full name: Rupert Harry Horsley
- Born: 17 December 1905; West Hartlepool, County Durham, England
- Died: 5 March 1988 (aged 82); Nether Wallop, Hampshire, England
- Batting: Right-handed
- Role: Wicket-keeper
- Relatives: Albert Beresford Horsley (father)

Domestic team information
- Years: Team
- 1927: Oxford University, Berkshire County

Career statistics
Competition	First-class
Matches	3
Runs scored	78
Batting average	19.50
100s/50s	–/–
Top score	25
Catches/stumpings	9/1
- Source: Cricinfo, 14 May 2020

Rupert Harry Horsley (17 December 1905 – 5 March 1988) was a teacher, an English first-class cricketer, an amateur painter of some skill, and a keen and knowledgeable gardener.

== Early life ==
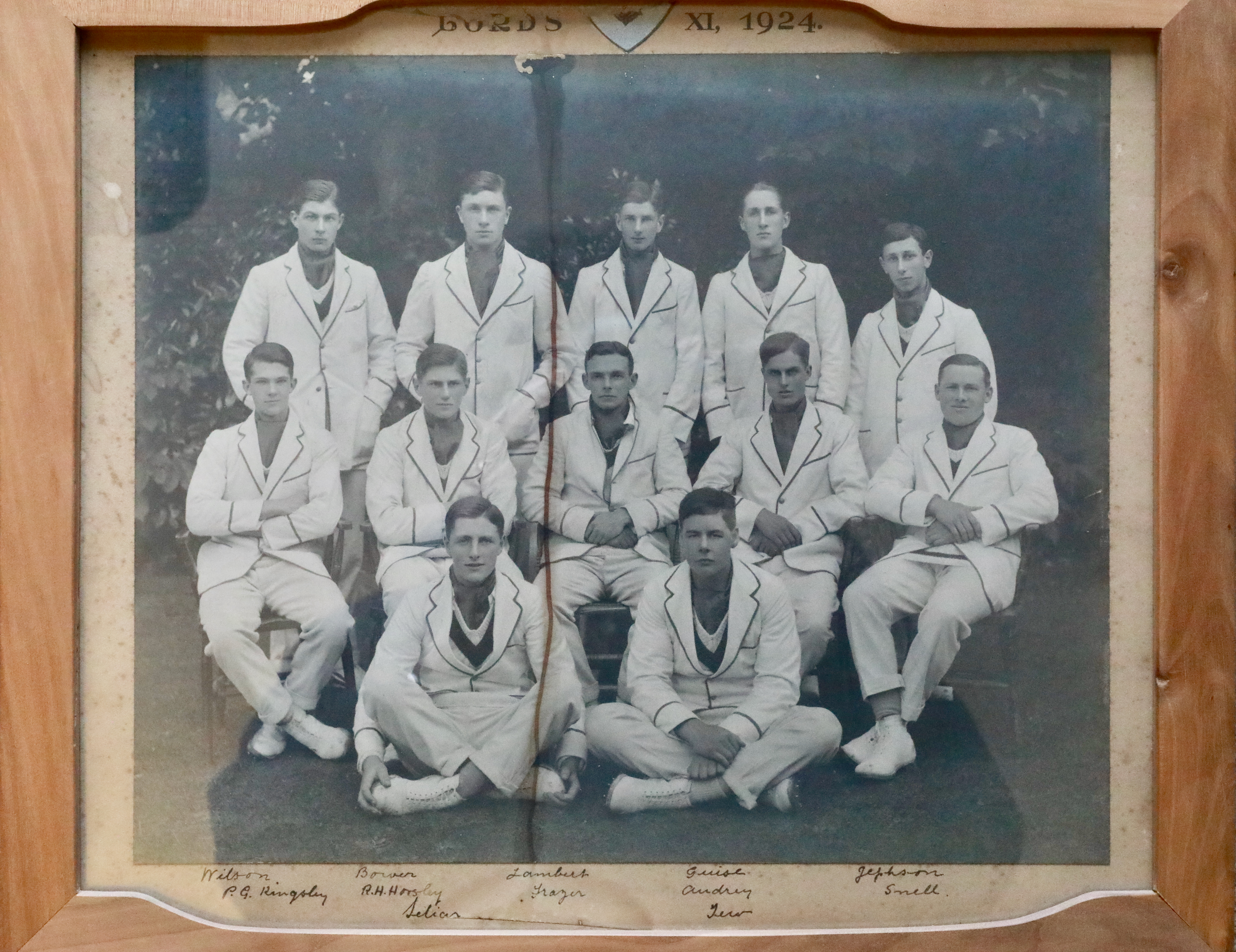
Winchester College cricket XI ("Lords") 1924

The son of Albert Beresford Horsley, and older brother of Sir Peter Horsley, he was born in December 1905 at West Hartlepool. He was educated at the Dragon School and Winchester College; from there he won an Exhibition to study history at Brasenose College, Oxford. While studying at Oxford, he made three appearances as a wicket-keeper in first-class cricket for Oxford University in 1927, against Lancashire, Harlequins and the Free Foresters. In his three matches, he scored 78 runs with a high score of 25, and behind the stumps he took nine catches and made a single stumping. During his time at Oxford, he was always second choice wicket-keeper to the exceptional George Abell. Subsequently, he played three matches for Berkshire, and others for Lord Dunglass' XI, Wellington College Masters, and Northumberland Club and Ground against Oxford University Authentics in which he scored 153 in 145 minutes in the second innings; the match was played at Osborne Avenue, Jesmond, on 14 and 15 July 1926. At Oxford he also studied art under Sydney Carline and Paul Nash.

== Career ==
He was appointed as an Assistant Master at Wellington College Berkshire (1929–1966); however he was told that they did not need History teachers, so was sent to Munich to learn German, and to the Sorbonne to improve his French, and subsequently taught both for the rest of his teaching career. In 1933 the Cambridge University Press published his book 'A German Course' which was re-issued by them in 2016 (ISBN 9781316612651).

At Wellington he became housemaster of The Murray early in his career - the youngest master ever to be put in charge of a house - and subsequently The Picton (1949–1961). Despite suffering two long bouts in hospital with polyneuropathy totalling almost a year and a half, he resumed teaching and only retired from Wellington in 1966, moving to Oxford where he taught languages at Lincoln, Brasenose and Oxford Brookes. As a teacher, he was an early advocate for language laboratories - although he failed to persuade Wellington to invest in one; in the 50's and 60's most schools did not think it necessary to teach students how to speak foreign languages with a good accent. He tried to change this by carrying a reel-to-reel Grundig tape-recorder into his classrooms so that his pupils could record answers to questions, practice listening to themselves, and improve their accents. He also devised other innovative teaching methods, such as visual aids together with Mary Comber, to help in the learning of lists - for example of exceptions to certain grammatical rules. Outside his teaching duties he built a rock garden by the old theatre, produced Shakespearian Tragedies with his wife Joy, encouraged his pupil's involvement in art and music, coached the Cricket Colts, and skied, canoed, and skated. During the war he organised Landwork for the entire school, which became self-sufficient in vegetables as a result, and trained the Air Section. Together with David Waddington, Head of Science, he orchestrated the college's response to World Refugee Year, which "raised hundreds of pounds and established a link with The Ockenden Venture," and also supported a refugee, Frau Koder, near Graz in Austria, who had become separated from her son and family during the war. This support helped her to build her own house after many years spent in displaced persons camps.

== Personal life ==
Retiring for a second time in 1970 he spent much of the rest of his life either gardening or painting, holding numerous one man exhibitions of his watercolours up and down the country - in London, Newcastle, Durham, Leicester, York, Oxford, Plymouth, Salisbury, Winchester, and Wetton in the Peak District. He liked to paint outside whatever the weather, and his favourite subjects were Venice, the Lake District, Devon/Cornwall, the North East, and the chalk streams and landscapes of Hampshire. He was a member of the Art Workers Guild. His ability to paint represented a victory over his earlier ill health, which caused considerable loss of feeling in his hands and feet. He had to re-learn to write, and to the end of his life continued to guide and steady his right hand with his left.

He married Joyce Muriel Paine in 1943 and had two sons. He died in Nether Wallop, Hampshire while gardening at his home.
