= John Horsley =

John Horsley may refer to:

- John Horsley (antiquarian) (1685–1732), British antiquarian
- John Callcott Horsley (1817–1903), English painter
- John Horsley (actor) (1920–2014), English actor
- John Horsley (MP) for Worcestershire (UK Parliament constituency)
