= Lionel Wells (cricketer) =

English cricketer

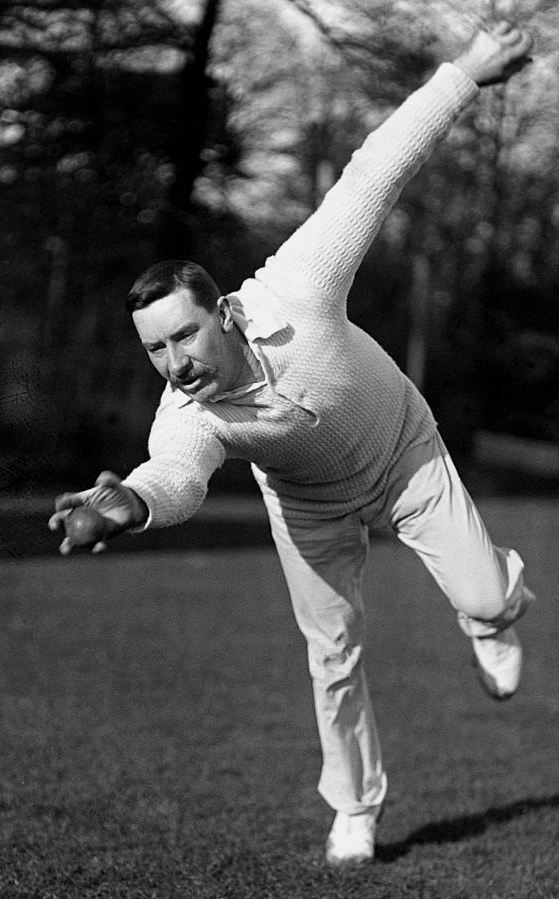
- Wells in about 1905

Personal information
- Born: 3 February 1870; St Pancras, London, England
- Died: 26 April 1928 (aged 58); Kennington, England
- Batting: Right-handed
- Bowling: Right-arm slow

Domestic team information
- Years: Team
- 1898–1905: Middlesex
- 1900–1904: London County
- Source: CricInfo, 25 March 2019

Lionel Seymour Wells (3 February 1870 – 26 April 1928) was an English first-class cricketer active 1896–1911 who played for Middlesex and London County.
