= George Horsley =

George Horsley (22 June 1836 – 2 December 1895) was a Hartlepool ship-owner, alderman and mayor of Hartlepool in 1875 and 1876.

His oldest son was Matthew Henry Horsley (1867–1925) who entered the family firm and became a noted ship-owner himself.

He married Alethea Anne. He is buried at Spion Kop Cemetery with his wife.
