= London County Cricket Club =

Former cricket club in London, United Kingdom

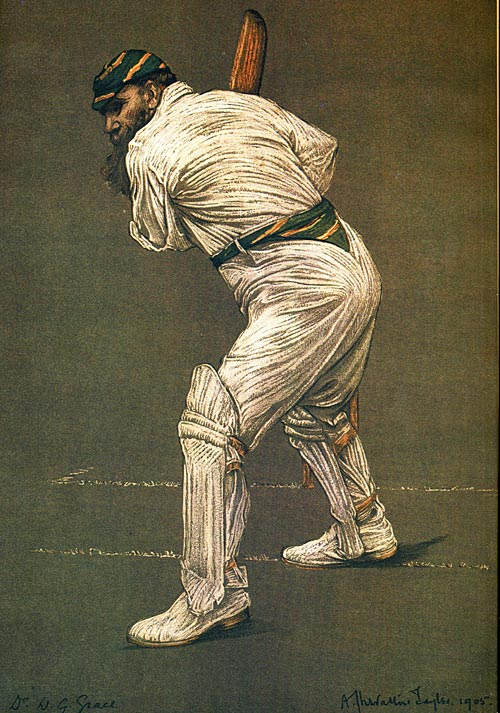
WG Grace in the colours of London County, painted by Albert Chevallier Tayler.

London County Cricket Club was a short-lived cricket club founded by the Crystal Palace Company. In 1898 they invited WG Grace to help them form a first-class cricket club. Grace accepted the offer and became the club's secretary, manager and captain. As a result, he severed his connection with Gloucestershire CCC during the 1899 season. The club only played exhibition matches, these were granted first-class status between 1900 and 1904.

The club's home ground was Crystal Palace Park Cricket Ground in south London. Some of the leading players of the time played matches for the club while continuing to play for their usual teams, among them CB Fry, JWHT Douglas, Albert Trott and Ranjitsinhji. The increase in the importance of the County Championship, Grace's own inevitable decline in form (given that he was over fifty years old) and the lack of a competitive element in the matches led to a decline in attendances and consequently meant the team lost money. The final first-class matches were played in 1904 and the enterprise folded in 1908.

In 2004, the name was used by former Essex, Somerset and Leicestershire wicketkeeper-batsman Neil Burns for a mentoring organisation for the development and support of cricketers.

== See also ==
- List of London County Cricket Club players
