= List of Old Harrovians =

Former pupils of Harrow School, Harrow on the Hill, London, are known as Old Harrovians.

== Politicians, civil servants, and royalty ==
=== Civil servants, intelligence officers, and police ===
- Sir Alex Allan (born 1951), Chairman of the Joint Intelligence Committee
- Sir William A. Baillie-Hamilton (1844–1920), Private Secretary to the Chief Secretary for Ireland and to the Secretary of State for the Colonies
- Peter Brodie (1914–1989), Her Majesty's Inspectorate of Constabulary (1964–1966)
- Robin Butler, Baron Butler of Brockwell (born 1938), Cabinet Secretary
- Sir Jock Colville (1915–1987), civil servant and diarist
- Montagu Corry, 1st Baron Rowton (1838–1903), Private Secretary to the Prime Minister of the United Kingdom (1868–1868; 1874–1880)
- Sir Kenelm Edward Digby (1836–1916), Under Secretary of State at the Home Office
- Frank Elliott (1874–1939), Metropolitan Police commissioner
- Major Edward Hay Mackenzie Elliot (1852–1920), Private Secretary to the Governor of New Zealand and Scottish footballer
- Arthur Henry Freeling (1820–1885), Surveyor General of South Australia (1849–1861)
- Henry Fyshe Gisborne (1813–1841), Port Phillip District commissioner
- Henry Graham (1842–1930), Clerk of the Parliaments (1885–1917)
- George Hamilton (1812–1883), Commissioner of the South Australia Police
- Alec Hardinge, 2nd Baron Hardinge of Penshurst (1894–1960), Private Secretary to Edward VIII and George VI
- Stuart Holland, 2nd Baron Rotherham (1876–1927), Inspector, Ministry of Pensions
- Brigadier Sir Eric Edward Boketon Holt-Wilson (1875–1950), deputy to the Director General of MI5 (1909–1940)
- Walter Dally Jones (1855–1926), assistant secretary to the Committee of Imperial Defence (1914–1919)
- John Kenrick (1735–1799), Clerk of the Deliveries of the Ordnance (1780–1783) MP for Bletchingley (1780–1790)
- Sir Henry Atwell Lake (1808–1881), Chief Commissioner of the Dublin Metropolitan Police
- James Masterton-Smith (1878–1938), Permanent Under-Secretary of State for the Colonies (1921–1925)
- Robert Henry Meade (1835–1898), Permanent Under-Secretary of State for the Colonies (1892–1897)
- Francis Mowatt (1837–1919), Head of HM Treasury
- George Murray (1849–1936), Secretary to the General Post Office (1899–1903)
- Charles Perceval, 2nd Baron Arden (1756–1840), Master of the Mint (1801–1802)
- Sir Dennis Proctor (1905–1983), British civil servant
- Malcolm Robinson (1857–1933), Chief Inspector of Factories of the British Government (1917–1920)
- Stephen Tallents (1884–1958), Secretary of the Empire Marketing Board

=== Diplomatic Service ===
- Sir Roderick Barclay (1909–1996), British Ambassador to Denmark (1956–1960) and to Belgium (1963–1969)
- Sir Brooke Boothby, 10th Baronet (1856–1913), Envoy Extraordinary and Minister Plenipotentiary to the Republic of Chile (1907)
- Reginald Bridgeman CMG (1884–1968), member of Her Majesty's Diplomatic Service and attempted Labour Party candidate
- Thomas Bruce, 7th Earl of Elgin (1766–1841), British Ambassador to Belgium (1792–1794), Prussia (1795–1799), and the Ottoman Empire (1799–1803); acquired the Elgin Marbles
- Henry Bulwer, 1st Baron Dalling and Bulwer MP (1801–1872), British Ambassador to Spain (1844–1848), the United States (1849–1852), Tuscany (1852–1854), and the Ottoman Empire (1858–1865)
- Nevile Butler (1893–1973), UK Ambassador to Brazil (1947–1951) and UK Ambassador to the Netherlands (1952–1954)
- Henry Ellis (1788–1855), ad interim Minister Plenipotentiary to Persia (1814–1815)
- Julian Fane (1827–1870), diplomat
- Mansfeldt Findlay (1861–1932), UK Ambassador to Saxony (1907–1909), to Bulgaria (1909–1911), and to Norway (1911–1923)
- Prince Mozaffar Firouz (1906–1988), Iranian ambassador to the USSR (1946–1947)
- Conyngham Greene (1854–1934), British Ambassador to Switzerland (1901–1905), to Romania (1906–1910), to Denmark (1911–1912), and to Japan (1912–1919)
- Sir Jeremy Greenstock (born 1943), British ambassador to the United Nations (1998–2003)
- Lepel Griffin (1838–1908), British diplomat in the British Raj
- John Harington Gubbins (1852–1929), linguist and diplomat
- Alexander Hamilton, 10th Duke of Hamilton (1767–1852), British Ambassador to Russia (1807) and MP for Lancaster (1802–1806)
- Sir Adrian Holman (1895–1974), British Ambassador to Cuba (1950–1954)
- Douglas Howard (1897–1987), British Ambassador to the Holy See (1953–1957)
- Esmé Howard, 1st Baron Howard of Penrith (1863–1939), British Ambassador to the United States (1924–1930)
- Anthony Lambert (1911–2007), UK Ambassador to Bulgaria (1958–1960), to Tunisia (1960–1963), to Finland (1963–1966), and to Portugal (1966–1970)
- Sir Frank Lascelles (1841–1920), British Ambassador to Persia (1891–1894), to Russia (1894–1895) and to Germany (1895–1908)
- Thomas Villiers Lister (1832–1902), diplomat
- Sir Gerard Lowther, 1st Baronet (1858–1916), UK Ambassador to the Ottoman Empire (1908–1913)
- Henry Lowther (1858–1939), UK Ambassador to Chile (1909–1913) and to Denmark (1913–1916)
- Ivo Mallet (1900–1988), UK Ambassador to Yugoslavia (1951–1954) and to Spain (1954–1960)
- Charles Mendl (1871–1958), British diplomat described as "one of the most colourful figures in the diplomatic and social life of Paris"
- Samuel Barrett Miles (1838–1914), British diplomat in Oman
- David Richard Morier (1784–1877), English diplomat and novelist
- Constantine Phipps (1840–1911), UK Ambassador to Brazil (1894–1900) and to Belgium (1900–1906)
- John Francis William, 6th Count de Salis-Soglio (1825–1871), diplomat
- Percy Smythe, 6th Viscount Strangford (1780–1855), British ambassador to Portugal (1806–1808), to Sweden (1817–1820), to Ottoman Turkey (1820–1824) and to Russia (1825–1826)
- Reginald Tower (1860–1939), diplomat (1885–1920)
- Francis Hyde Villiers (1852–1925), British Ambassador to Portugal (1906–1911) and to Belgium (1911–1920)
- Thomas Francis Wade (1818–1895), British diplomat, Sinologist, and namesake of the Wade–Giles romanization system
- Hugh Wyndham (1836–1916), British diplomat who was minister to Serbia (1885–1888), to Brazil (1888–1894), and to Romania (1894–1897)

=== Colonial Service and Imperial Administration ===
- Ernest Woodford Birch (1857–1929), British Resident of Perak (1904–1910)
- Charles Bruce (1836–1920), Governor of British Mauritius (1897–1903)
- Patrick Buchan-Hepburn, 1st Baron Hailes MP (1901–1974), Governor-General of the West Indies Federation (1958–1962)
- Robert Bulwer-Lytton, 1st Earl of Lytton (1831–1891), Viceroy of India (1876–1880)
- Sir Fowell Buxton, 3rd Baronet (1837–1915), Governor of South Australia (1895–1899)
- James Broun-Ramsay, 1st Marquess of Dalhousie (1812–1860), Governor-General of India (1848–1856)
- Drummond Chaplin (1866–1933), Administrator of Southern Rhodesia (1914–1923)
- Rohan Delacombe (1906–1991), Governor of Victoria (1963–1974)
- Sir John Eardley-Wilmot, 1st Baronet (1783–1847), Lieutenant-Governor of Van Diemen's Land (1843–1845)
- Ambrose Flux Dundas (1899–1973), Chief Commissioner of Baluchistan (1947–1948), Governor of North-West Frontier Province (1948–1949), and Lieutenant Governor of the Isle of Man (1952–1959)
- John FitzGibbon, 2nd Earl of Clare (1792–1851), Governor of Bombay (1831–1835)
- Sir Charles Augustus FitzRoy (1796–1858), Governor of New South Wales (1846–1855) and of Prince Edward Island (1837–1841)
- Francis Godschall Johnson (1817–1894), Lieutenant-Governor of Northwest Territories (1872)
- Sir William Henry Gregory (1816–1892), Anglo-Irish writer and politician, and Governor of British Ceylon (1872–1877)
- Albert Grey, 4th Earl Grey (1851–1917), Governor General of Canada (1904–1911)
- Charles Hardinge, 1st Baron Hardinge of Penshurst (1858–1944), Viceroy and Governor-General of India (1910–1916)
- George Herbert, 11th Earl of Pembroke MP (1759–1827), Governor of Guernsey (1807–1827)
- General William Knollys (1797–1883), Lieutenant Governor of Guernsey (1854–1856)
- General John Hodgson (1757–1846), Governor of Bermuda (1806–1810)
- John A. King (1788–1867), 20th Governor of New York State (1857–1858)
- Uchter Knox, 5th Earl of Ranfurly (1856–1933), Governor of New Zealand (1897–1904)
- Henry Augustus Marshall (c. 1776–1841), Auditor General of Sri Lanka (1823–1841)
- Sir Francis Henry May (1860–1922), Governor of Fiji (1911–1912) and of Hong Kong (1912–1918)
- Edward Merewether (1858–1938), Lieutenant Governor and Chief Secretary of Malta (1902–1911), Governor of Sierra Leone (1911–1916), and Governor of the Leeward Islands (1916–1921)
- William Montagu, 5th Duke of Manchester (1771–1843), Governor of Jamaica (1808–1827) and Postmaster General (1827–1830)
- Robert Francis Peel MP (1874–1924), Governor of Saint Helena (1920–1924)
- Sir William Chichele Plowden (1832–1915), Civil Servant and Member of the Legislative Council, India
- William Plunket, 5th Baron Plunket (1864–1920), Governor of New Zealand (1904–1910)
- Frederick Ponsonby MP (1783–1837), Governor of Malta (1826–1836)
- Vere Ponsonby, 9th Earl of Bessborough (1880–1956), Governor General of Canada (1931–1935)
- John Dickson-Poynder, 1st Baron Islington (1866–1936), Governor of New Zealand (1910–1912)
- Francis Rawdon-Hastings, 1st Marquess of Hastings (1754–1826), Governor General of India (1813–1823)
- Raja Maharaj Singh (1878–1959), First Indian Governor of Bombay (1948–1952)
- Thomas Smith-Dorrien-Smith (1846–1918), Lord Proprietor of the Isles of Scilly (1872–1918)
- George Rous, 3rd Earl of Stradbroke (1862–1947), Governor of Victoria (1921–1925)
- John Shore, 1st Baron Teignmouth (1751–1834), Governor General of India (1793–1798)
- John Montague Stow (1911–1997), Governor-General of Barbados (1966–1967)
- Alexander Strange (1818–1876), British army officer involved in the Great Trigonometrical Survey
- Sir Reginald Talbot (1841–1929), Governor of Victoria (1904–1908)
- Sir Richard Carnac Temple, 2nd Baronet (1850–1931), Chief Commissioner of the Andaman and Nicobar Islands (1895–1904), soldier, folklorist & anthropologist
- Basil Temple Blackwood (1870–1917), Colonial Secretary of Barbados
- Sir Henry George Ward MP (1797–1860), Governor of Ceylon (1855–1860)
- Sir Harcourt Butler (1869–1938), Governor of the United Provinces of Agra and Oudh
- Sir Alexander Baird, 1st Baronet (1849–1920), President of the Permanent Arbitration Board in Egypt
- Sir Percy Cox (1864–1937), High Commissioner of Iraq (1920–1923), Political Resident at Tehran
- Charles Stanhope Foster Crofton (1873–1909), member of the Indian Civil Service and a philatelist
- Sir Reginald Dorman-Smith (1899–1977), Governor of Burma
- G. Godfrey Phillips (1900–1965), Commissioner General, of the Shanghai Municipal Council

=== Royal Household and ceremonial officers ===
- Archibald Acheson, 6th Earl of Gosford (1911–1966), Lord-in-waiting (1958–1959)
- Sir Alexander Baird, 1st Baronet (1849–1920), Lord Lieutenant of Kincardineshire (1889–1918)
- Sir Arthur Bannerman, 12th Baronet (1866–1955), Gentleman Usher to George V
- Charles Bennet, 6th Earl of Tankerville MP (1810–1899), Lord Steward (1867–1868) and Captain of the Gentlemen at Arms (1866–1867)
- James Bethell, 5th Baron Bethell (1967–), Lord-in-waiting (2019–)
- Edward Hoblyn Warren Bolitho (1882–1969), Lord Lieutenant of Cornwall (1936–1962) and Chairman of Cornwall County Council (1941–1952)
- Orlando Bridgeman, 5th Earl of Bradford (1873–1957), Lord-in-waiting (1919–1924)
- Alan Brooke, 3rd Viscount Brookeborough (1952–), Lord Lieutenant of Fermanagh (2012–)
- Edward Sacheverell Chandos-Pole (1792–1863), High Sheriff of Derbyshire (1827)
- Charles Chetwynd-Talbot, 22nd Earl of Shrewsbury (1952–), Lord High Steward of Ireland (1980–)
- Henry Robert Clifton (1832–1896), High Sheriff of Nottinghamshire (1875)
- Charles Colville, 1st Viscount Colville of Culross (1818–1903), Master of the Buckhounds (1866–1868)
- Sir Frederick Goldney, 3rd Baronet (1845–1940), High Sheriff of Wiltshire (1908) and Mayor of Chippenham (1874; 1888)
- Robert Grosvenor, 5th Baron Ebury (1914–1957), Lord-in-waiting (1939–1940)
- St John Hornby (1867–1946), High Sheriff of the County of London (1906–1907)
- Michael Hughes-Young, 1st Baron St Helens MP (1912–1980), Treasurer of the Household (1962–1964)
- William Henry Leigh, 2nd Baron Leigh (1824–1905), Lord Lieutenant of Warwickshire (1856–1905)
- Algar Howard (1880–1970), Fitzalan Pursuivant Extraordinary (1911)
- William Dodge James (1854–1912), High Sheriff of Sussex (1897)
- Sir Alexander Leith, 1st Baronet (1869–1956), High Sheriff of Northumberland (1923)
- Carol Mather (1919–2006), Vice-Chamberlain of the Household (1981–1983)
- Charlie MacEwan (1966–), Equerry to Her Majesty Queen Elizabeth the Queen Mother
- Gerald Maitland-Carew (1941–), Lord Lieutenant of Roxburgh, Ettrick and Lauderdale (2007–2016)
- Paul Nicholson (1938–), Lord Lieutenant of Durham (1997–2013)
- James Orr (1917–2008), Private Secretary to the Duke of Edinburgh (1957–1970)
- Dealtry Charles Part (1882–1961), Lord Lieutenant of Bedfordshire (1943–1957)
- Charles Beaumont Phipps (1801–1866), Keeper of the Privy Purse (1849–1866)
- George Pitt-Rivers, 4th Baron Rivers (1810–1866), Lord-in-waiting
- Jacob Pleydell-Bouverie, 4th Earl of Radnor (1815–1889), Lord Lieutenant of Wiltshire (1878–1889)
- Henry Prittie, 4th Baron Dunalley (1851–1927), Lord-Lieutenant of County Tipperary (1905–1922)
- Robert Sanders, 1st Baron Bayford (1867–1940), Treasurer of the Household (1918–1919)
- Alan Stewart, 10th Earl of Galloway MP (1835–1901), Lord High Commissioner to the General Assembly of the Church of Scotland (1876–1877)
- John Stirling (1893–1975), Lord Lieutenant of Ross and Cromarty (1964–1968)
- George Herbert Strutt (1854–1928), High Sheriff of Derbyshire (1903–1904)
- Sir Godfrey Thomas, 10th Baronet (1889–1968), Assistant Private Secretary to Edward VIII (1936)
- Sir Edmund Verney, 6th Baronet (1950–), High Sheriff of Buckinghamshire (1998–1999)
- Major Sir Nevile Wilkinson (1869–1940), Principal Officer of Arms of Ireland
- Charles Yorke, 5th Earl of Hardwicke MP (1836–1897), Master of the Buckhounds (1874–1880)

=== Royalty ===
- Krishna Kumarsinhji Bhavsinhji (1912–1965), last Maharaja of Bhavnagar
- Prince Abbas Mirza Farman Farmaian (1890–1935), Iranian prince from the Qajar dynasty
- Prince Chula Chakrabongse of Siam (1908–1963)
- Ali bin Hamud of Zanzibar (1884–1918)
- Sheikh Tamim bin Hamad Al Thani (1980–), Emir of Qatar
- Ghazi of Iraq (1912–1939)
- King Faisal II of Iraq (1935–1958)
- Prince Hamzah bin Hussein of Jordan (1980–)
- Prince Hassan bin Talal of Jordan (1947–)
- Prince Rashid bin Hassan of Jordan (1979–)
- Prince Ghazi bin Muhammad (1966–), grandson of King Talal of Jordan
- Prince Talal bin Muhammad (1965–)
- Purachatra Jayakara (1881–1936)
- King Hussein of Jordan (1935–1999)
- Barkat Ali Khan Mukarram Jah (1934–), Nizam of Hyderabad in pretence
- Muffakham Jah (1939–), grandson of the Nizam of Hyderabad
- Jagaddipendra Narayan (1915–1970), Maharaja of Cooch Behar
- Lord Nicholas Windsor (1970–), younger son of the Duke of Kent
- Prince Mahidol Adulyadej of Songkhla of Thailand (1892–1929)
- Bhawani Singh (1931–2011), Maharaja of Jaipur (1970–2011)
- Wangchuk Namgyal (1953–), the Chogyal of Sikkim
- Prince Tommaso of Savoy (1854–1931), 2nd Duke of Genoa from the House of Savoy
- Sir Augustus d'Este (1794–1848), grandson of King George III and first known multiple sclerosis diagnosis of definite credibility
- George Mikhailovich, Count Brasov (1910–1931), morganatic descendant of Alexander III of Russia
- Chumbhotbongs Paribatra (1904–1959), Prince of Nakhon Sawan

=== Politicians ===
==== Prime Ministers and world leaders ====
- Stanley Baldwin, 1st Earl Baldwin of Bewdley (1867–1947), Conservative Prime Minister of the United Kingdom (1923–1924, 1924–1929, 1935–1937)
- Sir Winston Churchill (1874–1965), Prime Minister of the United Kingdom (1940–1945; 1951–1955), Nobel Laureate
- George Hamilton-Gordon, 4th Earl of Aberdeen (1784–1860), Prime Minister of the United Kingdom (1852–1855)
- Sir Robert Peel, 2nd Baronet (1788–1850), Prime Minister of the United Kingdom (1834–1835; 1841–1846)
- Spencer Perceval (1762–1812), Prime Minister of the United Kingdom (1809–1812) (Only British PM to be assassinated.)
- F. J. Robinson, 1st Viscount Goderich (1782–1859), Prime Minister of the United Kingdom (1827–1828)
- Henry John Temple, 3rd Viscount Palmerston (1784–1865), Prime Minister of the United Kingdom (1855–1858; 1859–1865)
- Jawaharlal Nehru (1889–1964), First Prime Minister of India (1947–1964)

==== Political party leaders ====
- Charles Buxton MP (1875–1942), Treasurer of the Independent Labour Party (1924–1927)
- Sir Stanley Jackson (1870–1947), cricketer and Chairman of the Conservative Party (1923–1926)
- Christopher Monckton, 3rd Viscount Monckton of Brenchley (1952–), Deputy Leader of the UK Independence Party (2010) and Leader of the Scottish UK Independence Party (2013)
- Thomas Spring Rice, 2nd Baron Monteagle of Brandon (1849–1926), founder of the Irish Dominion League

==== Cabinet members and parliament secretaries ====
- Evelyn Ashley MP (1836–1907), Under-Secretary of State for the Colonies (1882–1885)
- Robert Allan, Baron Allan of Kilmahew MP (1914–1979), Financial Secretary to the Admiralty (1958–1959)
- Leo Amery MP (1873–1955), First Lord of the Admiralty (1922–1924), Secretary of State for the Colonies (1924–1929) and Secretary of State for India and Burma (1940–1945)
- Colonel Wilfrid Ashley, 1st Baron Mount Temple (1867–1939), Minister for Transport (1924–1929)
- Sir John Milne Barbour, 1st Baronet (1868–1951), Minister of Commerce (1925–1941) and Minister of Finance in Northern Ireland (1941–1943)
- Ronald Barnes, 3rd Baron Gorell MP (1884–1963), Under-Secretary of State for Air (1921–1922)
- Scrope Bernard-Morland MP (1758–1830), Under-Secretary of State for the Home Department (1789–1794)
- George Bingham, 5th Earl of Lucan (1860–1949), Conservative Chief Whip in the House of Lords (1929–1940)
- Ivon Moore-Brabazon, 3rd Baron Brabazon of Tara (1946–), Minister of State for Foreign and Commonwealth Affairs (1989–1990) and Minister of State for Transport (1990–1992)
- Orlando Bridgeman, 3rd Earl of Bradford (1819–1898) MP, Lord Chamberlain (1866–1868)
- Noel Noel-Buxton, 1st Baron Noel-Buxton MP (1869–1948), Minister of Agriculture and Fisheries (1924, 1929–1930) and peer
- Sir Kenneth Carlisle MP (1941–), Lord Commissioner of the Treasury (1988–1990)
- Stephen Cave MP (1820–1880), Paymaster General (1866–1868; 1874–1880) and Judge Advocate General of the Armed Forces (1874–1875)
- William Cavendish, 6th Duke of Devonshire (1790–1858), Lord Chamberlain (1827–1828; 1830–1834)
- Lord Eustace Cecil MP (1834–1921), Surveyor-General of the Ordnance (1874–1880)
- Henry Chaplin, 1st Viscount Chaplin MP (1840–1923), Chancellor of the Duchy of Lancaster (1885–1886)
- Arthur Chichester, 4th Baron Templemore (1880–1953), Conservative Chief Whip in the House of Lords (1940–1945)
- George Clive MP (1805–1880), Under-Secretary of State for the Home Department (1859–1862)
- Francis Cowper, 7th Earl Cowper (1834–1905), Lord Lieutenant of Ireland (1880–1882)
- Robert Crewe-Milnes, 1st Marquess of Crewe (1858–1945), Lord Lieutenant of Ireland (1892–1895), Lord President of the Council (1905–1908; 1915–1916), and Leader of the House of Lords (1908–1916)
- George Robert Dawson (1790–1856), Financial Secretary to the Treasury (1830)
- Bill Deedes, Baron Deedes of Aldington (1913–2007), Minister without portfolio (1962–1964), MP, and editor of The Daily Telegraph (1974–1986)
- Herbert Dixon, 1st Baron Glentoran (1880–1950), Northern Ireland Minister of Agriculture (1941–1943)
- Colonel Sir Reginald Dorman-Smith MP (1899–1977), Minister for Agriculture (1939–1940) and Governor of Burma (1941–1946)
- Lawrence Dundas, 1st Marquess of Zetland (1844–1929), Lord Lieutenant of Ireland (1889–1892)
- Lawrence Dundas, 2nd Marquess of Zetland (1876–1961), Secretary of State for India (1935–1937)
- William Edgcumbe, 4th Earl of Mount Edgcumbe (1833–1917), Lord Chamberlain (1879–1880)
- Femi Fani-Kayode (1960–), Minister of Culture and Tourism (2006) and Minister of Aviation (2006–2007) of the Federal Republic of Nigeria
- Nigel Forbes, 22nd Lord Forbes (1918–2013), Minister of State for Scotland (1958–1959)
- Gerald Gardiner, Baron Gardiner (1900–1990), Lord Chancellor (1964–1970)
- Herbert Gardner, 1st Baron Burghclere MP (1846–1921), President of the Board of Agriculture (1892–1895)
- Cunninghame Graham (1852–1936), co-founder of the Scottish National Party and MP for North West Lanarkshire (1886–1892)
- Robert Grosvenor, 1st Marquess of Westminster (1767–1845), Lord of the Admiralty
- Lord Claud Hamilton (1813–1884), Vice-Chamberlain of the Household (1866–1868)
- Lord George Hamilton (1845–1927), Conservative Secretary of State for India (1895–1903)
- James Hamilton, 1st Duke of Abercorn (1811–1885), Lord Lieutenant of Ireland (1866–1868)
- Sir Percy Harris, 1st Baronet MP (1876–1952), Liberal Chief Whip (1935–1945)
- Sir William Hart Dyke, 7th Baronet (1837–1931), Chief Secretary for Ireland (1885–1886) and 1862 Rackets World Championships champion
- Gilbert Heathcote-Drummond-Willoughby, 1st Earl of Ancaster MP (1830–1910), Lord Great Chamberlain (1888–1901)
- Sidney Herbert, 1st Baron Herbert of Lea (1810–1861), Secretary of State for the Colonies (1855) and Secretary of State for War (1859–1861)
- Samuel Hoare, 1st Viscount Templewood (1880–1959), Conservative cabinet minister
- Sir John Hobson (politician) (1912–1967), Attorney General for England and Wales (1962–1964)
- Henry Holland, 1st Viscount Knutsford (1825–1914), Secretary of State for the Colonies (1887–1892)
- George William Hope (1808–1863), Under-Secretary of State for War and the Colonies (1841–1846)
- Phillip Oppenheim (1956–), Exchequer Secretary to the Treasury (1996–1997)
- Henry Howard, 18th Earl of Suffolk (1833–1898), Liberal MP for Malmesbury (1859–1868)
- Stafford Howard (1851–1916), Under-Secretary of State for India (1886)
- Sir James Hutchison, 1st Baronet (1893–1979), Under-Secretary of State for War (1951–1954)
- Sir Keith Joseph (1918–1994), 2nd Baronet, later Baron Joseph, Minister for Housing and Local Government (1962–1964), Secretary of State for Health and Social Services (1970–1974), Secretary of State for Industry (1979–1981), and Secretary of State for Education and Science (1981–1986)
- Sir John Burgess Karslake (1821–1881), Attorney General (1867–1868, 1874)
- George Legge, 3rd Earl of Dartmouth (1755–1810), Lord Chamberlain (1804–1810)
- Thomas Lister, 4th Baron Ribblesdale (1854–1925), Liberal Chief Whip in the House of Lords (1896–1907)
- Geoffrey Lloyd, Baron Geoffrey-Lloyd (1902–1984), Secretary of State for Education (1957–1959)
- Walter Long, 1st Viscount Long (1854–1924), Conservative Secretary of State for the Colonies (1916–1919)
- William Lowther, 2nd Earl of Lonsdale (1787–1872), Lord President of the Council (1852)
- Eric Lubbock, 4th Baron Avebury (1928–2016), Liberal Chief Whip (1963–1970)
- David Margesson, 1st Viscount Margesson (1890–1895), Secretary of State for War (1940–1942)
- Ronald McNeill, 1st Baron Cushendun MP (1861–1934), Chancellor of the Duchy of Lancaster (1927–1929)
- Walter Monckton (1891–1965), 1st Viscount Monckton of Brenchley, Conservative Minister of Defence (1955–1956)
- Lord Frederick Montagu (1774–1824), Postmaster General (1826–1827)
- Sir Frederick Peel (1823–1906), Under-Secretary of State for War (1855–1857) and Secretary to the Treasury (1860–1865)
- Sir Robert Peel, 3rd Baronet (1822–1895), Chief Secretary for Ireland (1861–1865)
- William Peel, 1st Earl Peel (1867–1937), Lord Privy Seal (1931)
- William Yates Peel (1789–1858), Lord of the Treasury (1830)
- Charles Pepys, 1st Earl of Cottenham (1781–1851), Lord Chancellor (1836–1841; 1846–1850)
- Constantine Phipps, 1st Marquess of Normanby (1797–1863), Home Secretary and Ambassador at Paris
- Edward Pleydell-Bouverie (1818–1889), Under-Secretary of State for the Home Department (1850–1852) etc.
- John Ponsonby, 4th Earl of Bessborough (1781–1847), Home Secretary (1834) and Lord Lieutenant of Ireland (1846–1847)
- John Profumo, 5th Baron Profumo (1915–2006), Conservative Secretary of State, known for the Profumo affair
- Matthew White Ridley, 1st Viscount Ridley (1842–1904), Home Secretary (1895–1900)
- Wyn Roberts, Baron Roberts of Conwy MP (1930–2013), Minister of State for Wales (1987–1994)
- George W. E. Russell (1853–1919), Under-Secretary of State for India (1892–1894) and Under-Secretary of State for the Home Department (1894–1895)
- Dudley Ryder, 1st Earl of Harrowby (1762–1847), Foreign Secretary (1804–1805)
- Dudley Ryder, 3rd Earl of Harrowby (1831–1900), President of the Board of Trade (1878–1880)
- Richard Ryder (1766–1832), Home Secretary (1809–1812)
- J. E. B. Seely, 1st Baron Mottistone (1868–1947), Secretary of State for War (1912–1914)
- Charles Seymour, 6th Duke of Somerset (1662–1748), Lord President of the Council (1702)
- Francis Seymour, 5th Marquess of Hertford (1812–1884), Lord Chamberlain (1874–1879)
- Ughtred Kay-Shuttleworth, 1st Baron Shuttleworth (1844–1939), Parliamentary and Financial Secretary to the Admiralty (1892–1895), Chancellor of the Duchy of Lancaster (1886) and Under-Secretary of State for India (1886)
- T. H. S. Sotheron-Estcourt (1801–1876), Home Secretary (1859)
- George Spencer, 2nd Earl Spencer (1758–1834), Home Secretary (1806–1807)
- John Spencer, 3rd Earl Spencer (1782–1845), Chancellor of the Exchequer (1830–1834)
- John Spencer, 5th Earl Spencer (1835–1910), Lord Lieutenant of Ireland (1868–1874) and Lord President of the Council (1880–1883)
- Charles Spencer, 6th Earl Spencer (1857–1922), Lord Chamberlain (1905–1912)
- Edward Stanhope (1840–1893), Secretary of State for War (1887–1892)
- Ben Stoneham, Baron Stoneham of Droxford (1948–), Liberal Democrat Chief Whip of the House of Lords (2012–2016)
- Sir Charles Trevelyan, 3rd Baronet (1870–1958), President of the Board of Education (1924; 1929–1931)
- Sir George Trevelyan, 2nd Baronet (1838–1928), Secretary for Scotland (1886; 1892–1895)
- Edward Villiers, 5th Earl of Clarendon (1846–1914), Lord Chamberlain (1900–1905)
- George Child Villiers, 5th Earl of Jersey (1773–1859), Lord Chamberlain (1830)
- Richard Wellesley, 1st Marquess Wellesley (1760–1842), Governor General of India and Secretary of State for Foreign Affairs (1809–1812)
- William Wickham (1761–1840), Under-Secretary of State for the Home Department (1798–1801)
- Philip Yorke, 3rd Earl of Hardwicke (1757–1834), Lord Lieutenant of Ireland (1801–1805)

==== British MPs ====
- Archibald Acheson, 3rd Earl of Gosford (1806–1864), MP for County Armagh
- Sir Thomas Dyke Acland, 10th Baronet (1787–1871), Conservative MP for Devon (1812–1818;1820–1831) and North Devon (1837–1857)
- Sir Thomas Dyke Acland, 11th Baronet (1809–1898), Tory-turned-Liberal MP for Somerset West (1837–1847), Devonshire North (1865–1885) and Wellington (1885–1886)
- Hugh Adair (1815–1902), Liberal MP for Ipswich (1847–1874)
- Major William Augustus Adam (1865–1940), Conservative MP for Woolwich (1910) who fought in the Russo-Japanese War and was the plaintiff of Adam v Ward
- Thomas Agar-Robartes, 6th Viscount Clifden (1844–1930), Liberal MP for Cornwall East (1880–1882) and Lord Lieutenant of Cambridgeshire (1906–1915)
- Sir James Agg-Gardner (1846–1928), Conservative MP for Cheltenham (1874–1880; 1885–1895; 1900–1906; 1911–1928)
- Sir Andrew Agnew, 8th Baronet (1818–1892), Liberal MP for Wigtownshire (1856–1868)
- Sir Andrew Agnew, 9th Baronet (1850–1928), Liberal Unionist MP for Edinburgh South (1900–1906)
- Thomas Alcock (1801–1866), MP and High Sheriff of Surrey (1837)
- Peter Aldous (1961–), Conservative MP for Waveney (2010–)
- Samuel Allsopp, 2nd Baron Hindlip (1842–1897), Conservative MP for East Staffordshire (1873–1880) and Taunton (1882–1887) and peer
- Sir Robert Anstruther, 5th Baronet (1834–1886), Liberal MP for Fife (1864–1880) and St Andrews Burghs (1885–1886), peer, and Lord Lieutenant of Fife (1864–1886)
- Richard Arkwright (1835–1918), Conservative MP for Leominster (1866–1876)
- John Baird (1852–1900), Unionist MP for North West Lanarkshire (1885–1886)
- Alexander Charles Barclay (1823–1893), Liberal MP for Taunton (1859–1880) and brewer
- Alexander Baring, 4th Baron Ashburton (1835–1889), Conservative MP for Thetford and peer (1857–1867)
- Thomas Charles Baring (1831–1891), Conservative MP for Essex South (1874–1885) and the City of London (1887–1891), and member of the Barings Bank family
- Hamar Alfred Bass (1842–1898), Liberal MP for Tamworth (1878–1885) and West Staffordshire (1885–1898) and member of the Bass Brewery family
- Michael Bass, 1st Baron Burton (1837–1909), Liberal MP for Stafford (1865–1868), Staffordshire East (1868–1885) and Burton (1885–1886), peer, and brewer
- Francis Basset, 1st Baron de Dunstanville (1757–1835), MP for Penryn (1780–1796) and peer
- Somerset Beaumont (1835–1921), Liberal MP for Newcastle-upon-Tyne (1860–1865) and Wakefield (1868–1874)
- Wentworth Beaumont, 1st Baron Allendale (1829–1907), Liberal MP for Northumberland South (1852–1885) and Tyneside (1886–1892) and peer
- Sir Henry Bellingham, 4th Baronet (1846–1921), MP for County Louth (1880–1885) and Lord Lieutenant of Louth (1911–1921)
- Michael Biddulph, 1st Baron Biddulph (1834–1923), Liberal (Unionist) MP for Herefordshire (1865–1880) and Ross (1885–1900)
- John Blackburne (1754–1833), MP for Lancashire (1784–1830) and High Sheriff of Lancashire (1781–1782)
- John Blackett (1821–1856), MP for Newcastle-upon-Tyne (1852–1856)
- Bartholomew Bouverie (1753–1835), MP for Downton (1779–1780; 1790–1796; 1806–1812; 1819–1826; 1826–1830)
- William Henry Bouverie (1752–1806), MP for Salisbury (1776–1802)
- Sir Henry Bowles, 1st Baronet (1858–1943), Conservative MP for Enfield (1889–1906; 1918–1922) and Middlesex County Automobile Club president (1905–1943)
- Archibald Boyd-Carpenter (1873–1937), Paymaster General (1923–1924)
- Robert Haldane Bradshaw (1759–1835), Superintendent of the Bridgewater Canal Trustees and MP for Brackley (1802–1832)
- George Bridgeman, 4th Earl of Bradford (1845–1915), MP for North Shropshire (1867–1885) and peer
- Henry Simpson Bridgeman (1757–1782), MP for Wigan (1780–1782)
- Orlando Bridgeman, 1st Earl of Bradford (1762–1825), Tory MP for Wigan (1784–1800) and peer
- Allan Heywood Bright (1862–1941), Liberal MP for Oswestry (1904–1906)
- William Bromley-Davenport (1821–1884), Conservative MP for North Warwickshire (1864–1884)
- John Brooks (1856–1886), Conservative MP for Altrincham (1885–1886)
- Robert Brudenell, 6th Earl of Cardigan (1760–1837), Tory MP for Marlborough (1797–1802), peer, and first-class cricketer
- William Brymer (1840–1909), Conservative MP for Dorchester (1874–1885) and South Dorset (1891–1906)
- Sir John Buxton, 2nd Baronet (1788–1842), MP for Great Bedwyn (1818–1832)
- Major-General Thomas Calley (1856–1932), Liberal Unionist MP for Cricklade (1910) and soldier (Battle of Tel el-Kebir)
- Nicolson Calvert (1764–1841), Whig MP for Hertford (1802–1826) and Hertfordshire (1826–1835)
- Donald Cameron (1976–), Member of the Scottish Parliament for Highlands and Islands (2016–)
- John Campbell (1798–1830), MP for Dunbartonshire (1826–1830)
- Sir William Carlile, 1st Baronet (1862–1950), Conservative MP for Buckingham (1895–1906)
- William George Cavendish-Bentinck (1854–1909), Conservative MP for Penryn and Falmouth (1886–1895), who married into the Livingston family of the U.S. state of New York
- Robert Chaloner (1776–1842), MP for Richmond (1810–1818) and York (1820–1826)
- Thomas Chester-Master (1841–1914), Conservative MP for Cirencester (1878–1885; 1892–1893)
- Sir George Chetwynd, 2nd Baronet (1783–1850), MP for Stafford (1820–1826)
- Sir Hugh Cholmeley, 3rd Baronet (1839–1904), MP and Grantham (1868–1880)
- Alfred Chotzner (1873–1958), Conservative MP for Upton (1931–1934)
- Sir Frederick Cook, 2nd Baronet (1844–1920), Conservative MP for Kennington (1895–1906)
- Robert Cooke (1930–1987), Conservative MP for Bristol West (1957–1979) and Baby of the House (1957–1958)
- Frederick Snowdon Corrance (1822–1906), Conservative MP for East Suffolk (1867–1874)
- James Crosbie (c. 1760–1836), MP for County Kerry in both the Irish (1798–1800) and British parliaments (1801–1806; 1812–1826)
- Adolphus Dalrymple (1784–1866), MP for Weymouth and Melcombe Regis (1817–1818), Appleby (1819–1826), Haddington Burghs (1826–1831) and Brighton (1837–1841)
- Sir Charles Dalrymple, 1st Baronet (1839–1916), Conservative MP for Buteshire (1868–1880; 1880–1885) and Ipswich (1885–1906)
- Harry Davenport (1833–1895), Conservative MP for North Staffordshire (1880–1885) and Leek (1886–1892)
- Duncan Davidson of Tulloch (1800–1881), MP for Cromartyshire (1826–1830; 1831–1832)
- David Arthur Saunders Davies (1792–1857), Conservative MP for Carmarthenshire (1842–1857)
- James Dawes (1866–1921), Liberal MP for Walworth (1910–1918) and Southwark South East (1918–1921)
- Richard Thomas Dawson, 2nd Baron Cremorne (1788–1827), MP for County Monaghan (1812–1813)
- Sir Edward Dering, 8th Baronet (1807–1896), MP and High Sheriff of Kent (1836)
- Charles Eurwicke Douglas (1806–1887), Conservative MP for Warwick (1837–1852) and Banbury (1859–1865)
- Richard Drax (1958–), Conservative MP for South Dorset (2010–)
- Henry Drummond (1762–1794), MP for Castle Rising (1790–1794)
- Charles Duncombe, 1st Baron Feversham (1764–1841), Conservative MP for Shaftesbury (1790–1796), Aldborough (1796–1806), Heytesbury (1812–1818) and Newport, Isle of Wight (1818–1826)
- Thomas Slingsby Duncombe (1796–1861), Whig MP for Hertford (1826–1832) and Finsbury (1834–1861)
- Lawrence Dundas, 1st Earl of Zetland (1766–1839), Whig MP for Richmond (Yorkshire) (1790–1802; 1808–1811) and York (1802–1807; 1811–1820)
- Thomas Dundas, 2nd Earl of Zetland (1795–1873), Whig MP for Richmond (Yorkshire) (1818–1830; 1835–1839) and York (1830–1832)
- Sir James Buller East, 2nd Baronet (1789–1878), Tory-turned-Conservative MP for Winchester (1831–1832; 1835–1864)
- George Edgcumbe (1800–1882), MP for Plympton Erle (1826)
- Cuthbert Ellison (1783–1860), Whig MP for Newcastle upon Tyne (1812–1830)
- Henry Eyre (1834–1904), Conservative MP for Gainsborough (1886–1892)
- John Farr (1922–1997), Conservative MP for Harborough (1959–1992)
- Sir William ffolkes, 2nd Baronet (1786–1860), Whig MP for Norfolk (1830–1832) and Norfolk West (1832–1837)
- Sir William ffolkes, 3rd Baronet (1847–1912), Liberal MP for King's Lynn (1880–1885)
- George Finch (1794–1870), MP for Lymington (1820–1821), Stamford (1832–1837) and Rutland (1846–1847)
- Edmund Findlay (1902–1962), Unionist MP for Banffshire (1935–1945)
- George FitzRoy, 4th Duke of Grafton (1760–1844), Whig MP for Thetford (1782–1784) and Cambridge University (1784–1811)
- Lord John FitzRoy (1785–1856), Whig MP for Thetford (1812–1818) and Bury St Edmunds (1820–1826)
- William FitzRoy, 6th Duke of Grafton (1819–1882), MP for Thetford (1847–1863)
- Sir John Fletcher, 1st Baronet (1841–1924), MP for Hampstead (1905–1918)
- Cyril Flower, 1st Baron Battersea (1843–1907), Liberal MP for Brecon (1880–1885) and Luton (1885–1892)
- John Anthony Fonblanque (1759–1837), Whig MP for Camelford (1802–1812)
- Hugh Fortescue, 4th Earl Fortescue (1854–1932), Liberal MP for Tiverton (1881–1885) and Tavistock (1885–1892), Lord Lieutenant of Devon (1904–1928), and sport hunter
- William Fuller-Maitland (1844–1932), Liberal MP for Breconshire (1875–1895) and first-class cricketer
- William Garfit (1840–1920), Conservative MP for Boston (1895–1906)
- John Carpenter Garnier (1839–1926), Conservative MP for South Devon (1873–1884) and first-class cricketer
- William Gerard (c. 1551–1609), MP for Wigan (1584–1588; 1593–1597)
- Charles Tyrrell Giles (1850–1840), Conservative MP for Wisbech (1895–1900)
- Clifford Glossop (1901–1975), Conservative MP for Penistone (1931–1935) and Howdenshire (1945–1947)
- Ralph Glyn, 1st Baron Glyn (1884–1960), Conservative MP for Clackmannan and Eastern Stirlingshire (1918–1922) and Abingdon (1924–1953)
- William Grenfell, 1st Baron Desborough (1855–1945), MP for Salisbury (1880–1882; 1885–1886), Hereford (1892–1893) and Wycombe (1900–1905), athlete, and peer
- John Gretton, 1st Baron Gretton (1867–1947), MP for Derbyshire South (1895–1906), Rutland (1907–1918) and Burton (1918–1943), and Olympic gold sailing medalist in 1900
- James Grimston, 3rd Earl of Verulam (1852–1924), Conservative MP for St Albans (1885–1892)
- Robert Grosvenor, 2nd Baron Ebury (1834–1918), MP for Westminster (1865–1874) and cricketer
- Charles Hall (1843–1900), Conservative MP for Chesterton (1885–1892) and Holborn (1892–1900)
- Robert Westley Hall-Dare (1789–1836), MP for South Essex (1832–1836)
- Lord Claud Hamilton (1787–1808), MP for Dungannon (1807–1808), who died young and is suggested by The History of Parliament to have never even taken his seat
- Lord Ernest Hamilton (1858–1939), Conservative MP for Tyrone North (1885–1892)
- James Hamilton, Viscount Hamilton (1786–1814), MP for Dungannon (1807) and Liskeard (1807–1812)
- James Hamilton, 2nd Duke of Abercorn (1838–1913), Conservative MP for County Donegal (1860–1880), Lord Lieutenant of Donegal (1885–1913), and peer
- John Hamilton, 1st Marquess of Abercorn (1756–1818), Conservative MP for East Looe (1783–1784) and St Germans (1784–1789)
- George Hamilton-Gordon, 5th Earl of Aberdeen (1816–1864), Liberal MP for Aberdeenshire (1854–1860)
- Francis Herne (c. 1702–1776), MP for Bedford (1754–1768) and Camelford (1774–1776)
- John Heron-Maxwell (1836–1899), Liberal MP for Kirkcudbright (1880–1885) and first-class cricketer
- Sir Samuel Hoare, 1st Baronet (1841–1915), Conservative MP for Norwich (1886–1906)
- John Robert Hollond (1843–1912), Liberal (Unionist) MP for Brighton (1880–1885)
- Alexander Beresford Hope (1820–1887), Conservative MP for Maidstone (1841–1852; 1857–1859), Stoke-upon-Trent (1865–1868) and Cambridge University (1868–1887) and supporter of the Confederate States of America
- Edward Hornby (1839–1887), Conservative MP for Blackburn (1869–1874) and first-class cricketer
- Henry Howard, 2nd Earl of Effingham (1806–1889), Whig MP for Shaftesbury (1841–1845)
- William Bulkeley Hughes (1797–1882), MP for Carnarvon (1837–1859; 1865–1882)
- Arthur Humphreys-Owen (1836–1905), Liberal MP for Montgomeryshire (1894–1905)
- Robert Ingham (1793–1875), MP for South Shields (1832–1841; 1852–1868)
- Cuthbert James (1872–1930), Conservative MP for Bromley (1919–1930)
- Weston Jarvis (1855–1939), Conservative MP for King's Lynn (1886–1892)
- Henry Jervis-White-Jervis (1825–1881), Conservative MP for Harwich (1859–1880)
- Sir John Kennaway, 3rd Baronet (1837–1919), Conservative MP for East Devon (1870–1885) and Honiton (1885–1910)
- Nigel Kennedy (1889–1964), MP for Lonsdale (1922–1923)
- George Thomas Kenyon (1840–1908), Conservative MP for Denbigh Boroughs (1885–1895; 1900–1906)
- Edward King (1774–1807), MP for County Roscommon (1802–1806) and navy commander
- Peter King (1811–1885), Liberal MP for East Surrey (1847–1874) best known for the Real Estate Charges Act 1854
- Peter La Touche (c. 1775–1830), MP for County Leitrim (1802–1806)
- George Lambert, 2nd Viscount Lambert (1909–1989), MP for South Molton (1945–1950) and Torrington (1950–1958)
- Antony Lambton (1922–2006), disclaimed 6th Earl of Durham, MP for Berwick-upon-Tweed (1951–1973)
- John Laurie (1835–1912), MP for Pembroke and Haverfordwest (1895–1906)
- Sir Wilfrid Lawson, 3rd Baronet, of Brayton (1862–1937), Liberal MP for Cockermouth (1910–1916)
- Gilbert Leigh (1851–1884), Liberal MP for Warwickshire South (1880–1884)
- Stanley Leighton (1837–1901), antiquarian and MP for North Shropshire (1876–1885) and Oswestry (1885–1901)
- John Lemon (1754–1814), Whig MP for West Looe (1784), Saltash (1787–1790) and Truro (1796–1814)
- Sir John Leslie, 1st Baronet (1822–1916), MP for County Monaghan (1871–1880)
- Sir Thomas Lloyd, 1st Baronet (1820–1877), Liberal MP for Cardiganshire (1865–1868) and Cardigan Boroughs (1868–1874)
- Eric Long, 3rd Viscount Long (1892–1967), MP for Westbury (1927–1931)
- Richard Penruddocke Long (1825–1875), Conservative MP for Chippenham (1859–1865) and North Wiltshire (1865–1868)
- David Lyon (1794–1872), MP for Bere Alston and subject of a Thomas Lawrence painting
- Sir George Macpherson-Grant, 3rd Baronet (1839–1907), cattle breeder and MP for Elginshire and Nairn (1879–1886)
- Sir William Makins, 1st Baronet (1840–1906), Conservative MP for South Essex (1874–1885), South East Essex (1885–1886) and Walthamstow (1886–1892)
- Geoffrey Mander (1882–1962), Liberal MP for Wolverhampton East (1929–1945) and paint industrialist
- Sir Courtenay Mansel, 13th Baronet (1880–1933), Liberal MP for Penryn and Falmouth (1923–1924)
- Malcolm McCorquodale, 1st Baron McCorquodale of Newton (1901–1971), Conservative MP for Sowerby (1931–1945) and Epsom (1947–1955)
- Alan McLean (1875–1959), MP for South West Norfolk (1923–1929)
- Sigismund Mendl (1866–1945), MP for Plymouth (1898–1900)
- Robert Stewart Menzies (1856–1889), Liberal MP for East Perthshire (1885–1889)
- Henry Meynell (1789–1865), MP for Lisburn (1826–1847)
- John Mills (1789–1871), Tory-turned-Conservative MP for Rochester (1831–1835) and first-class cricketer
- William Molesworth-St Aubyn (1838–1895), MP for Helston (1880–1885)
- Matthew Montagu, 4th Baron Rokeby (1762–1831), MP for Bossiney (1786–1790), Tregony (1790–1796), and St Germans (1806–1812)
- Charles Morgan, 1st Baron Tredegar (1792–1875), MP for Brecon (1812–1818; 1830–1832; 1835–1847) and Lord Lieutenant of Brecknockshire (1866–1875)
- E. J. C. Morton (1856–1902), Liberal MP for Devonport (1892–1902)
- John Mytton (1796–1834), Tory MP for Shrewsbury (1819–1820), eccentric, and rake; expelled from Harrow
- John Neeld (1805–1891), Conservative MP for Cricklade (1835–1859) and Chippenham (1865–1868)
- Anthony Nelson (1948–), Conservative MP for Chichester (1974–1997)
- John Sanctuary Nicholson (1863–1924), Conservative MP for Westminster Abbey (1921–1924)
- William Nicholson (1824–1909), Liberal MP for Petersfield (1866–1874; 1880–1885)
- William Graham Nicholson (1862–1942), Liberal Unionist and Conservative MP for Petersfield (1897–1935)
- Frederick North (1800–1869), Liberal MP for Hastings (1831–1837; 1854–1865; 1868–1869)
- Lucius O'Brien, 13th Baron Inchiquin (1800–1872), Tory MP for County Clare (1826–1830; 1847–1852) and Lord Lieutenant of Clare (1843–1872)
- William Smith O'Brien (1803–1864), Irish nationalist deported to Van Diemen's Land for sedition in the Young Irelander Rebellion of 1848 and MP for Ennis (1828–1831) and County Limerick (1835–1849)
- Robert Torrens O'Neill (1845–1910), Conservative/Unionist MP for Mid Antrim (1885–1910)
- Sir John Ogilvy, 9th Baronet (1803–1890), Liberal MP for Dundee (1857–1874)
- Cranley Onslow, Baron Onslow of Woking (1926–2001), Conservative MP for Woking (1964–1997)
- Guy Opperman (1965–), Conservative MP for Hexham (2010–)
- Charles Lindsay Orr-Ewing (1860–1903), Conservative MP for Ayr Burghs (1895–1904)
- Ian Orr-Ewing, Baron Orr-Ewing (1912–1999), Conservative MP for Hendon North (1950–1970)
- John Page (1919–2008), Conservative MP for Harrow West (1960–1987)
- Almeric Paget, 1st Baron Queenborough (1861–1949), Conservative MP for Cambridge (1910–1917)
- George Palmer (1857–1932), Conservative MP for Westbury (1918–1922)
- George Parkyns, 2nd Baron Rancliffe (1785–1850), MP for Minehead (1806–1807) and Nottingham (1812–1820; 1826–1830)
- Walter Pelham, 4th Earl of Chichester (1838–1902), Liberal MP for Lewes (1865–1874)
- John Penn (1848–1903), Conservative MP for Lewisham (1891–1903)
- John Penruddocke (1770–1841), Tory/Conservative MP for Wilton (1821–1837)
- Frederick Thomas Penton (1851–1929), Conservative MP for Finsbury Central (1886–1892)
- John Perry-Watlington (1823–1882), MP for South Essex (1859–1865)
- Basil Peto (1862–1945), Conservative MP for Devizes (1910–1918) and Barnstaple (1922–1923; 1924–1935)
- Sir Henry Peyton, 2nd Baronet (1779–1854), MP for Cambridgeshire (1802)
- George Lort Phillips (1811–1866), Conservative MP for Pembrokeshire (1861–1866)
- Jacob Pleydell-Bouverie, 2nd Earl of Radnor (1750–1828), MP for Salisbury (1771–1776) and Lord Lieutenant of Berkshire (1791–1819)
- Jacob Pleydell-Bouverie, 6th Earl of Radnor (1868–1930), Conservative MP for Wilton (1892–1900) and Lord Lieutenant of Wiltshire (1925–1930)
- William Pollard-Urquhart (1815–1871), Liberal MP for County Westmeath (1852–1857; 1859–1871) and writer
- Melville Portal (1819–1904), MP for North Hampshire (1849–1857)
- M. Philips Price (1885–1973), Liberal and Labour MP for Whitehaven (1929–1931), Forest of Dean (1935–1950), and West Gloucestershire (1950–1959)
- Archibald Primrose, Lord Dalmeny (1809–1851), Liberal MP for Stirling Burghs (1832–1847)
- Charles Small Pybus (1766–1810), MP for Dover (1790–1802)
- James Remnant, 1st Baron Remnant (1862–1933), Conservative MP for Holborn (1900–1928)
- Leslie Renton (1868–1947), Liberal (Unionist) MP for Gainsborough (1906–1910)
- John Maunsell Richardson (1846–1912), cricketer and Conservative MP for Brigg (1894–1895)
- Edward Ridley (1843–1928), MP for South Northumberland (1878–1880)
- Sir Samuel Roberts, 2nd Baronet (1882–1955), Conservative MP for Hereford (1921–1929) and Sheffield Ecclesall (1929–1935)
- Sir George Robinson, 6th Baronet (1766–1833), MP for Northampton (1830–1832)
- Mark Robinson (1946–), Conservative MP for Newport West (1983–1987) and Somerton and Frome (1992–1997)
- Walter Roch (1880–1965), Liberal MP for Pembrokeshire (1908–1918)
- Leonard Ropner (1895–1977), Conservative MP for Sedgefield (1923–1929) and Barkston Ash (1931–1964)
- Lionel de Rothschild (1882–1942), MP for Aylesbury (1910–1923)
- Richard Roundell (1872–1940), MP for Skipton (1918–1924)
- Sir William Rowley, 2nd Baronet (1761–1832), MP for Suffolk (1812–1830)
- Anthony Royle, Baron Fanshawe of Richmond (1927–2001), Conservative MP for Richmond (1959–1983)
- George Rushout, 3rd Baron Northwick (1811–1887), MP for Evesham (1837–1841) and Worcestershire East (1847–1859)
- John Russell, Viscount Amberley (1842–1876), MP for Nottingham (1866–1868)
- Samuel Elias Sawbridge (1769–1850), MP for Canterbury (1796–1797; 1797; 1807)
- Bob Seely (1966–), Conservative Party MP for Isle of Wight (2017–)
- Sir Charles Seely, 2nd Baronet (1859–1926), Liberal MP for Lincoln (1895–1906) and Mansfield (1916–1918)
- Henry Seton-Karr (1853–1914), Conservative MP for St Helens (1885–1906) and game hunter who died aboard the RMS Empress of Ireland
- Hugh Henry John Seymour (1790–1821), MP for Antrim (1818–1821)
- Herbert Shepherd-Cross (1847–1916), Conservative MP for Bolton (1885–1906)
- Humphrey Sibthorp (1744–1815), MP for Boston (1777–1784) and Lincoln (1800–1806)
- Sir George Sinclair, 2nd Baronet (1790–1868), Whig MP for Caithness (1811–1812; 1818–1820; 1831–1841) and author
- Tim Smith (1947–), Conservative MP for Ashfield (1977–1979) and Beaconsfield (1982–1997)
- Alexander Sprot (1853–1919), Unionist MP for East Fife (1918–1922) and North Lanarkshire (1924–1929)
- Francis Seymour Stevenson (1862–1938), Liberal MP for Eye (1885–1906)
- Randolph Stewart, 9th Earl of Galloway (1800–1873), MP for Cockermouth (1826–1831)
- William Henry Stone (1834–1896), Liberal MP for Portsmouth (1865–1874)
- Bertram Straus (1867–1933), MP for Mile End (1906–1910)
- Henry Strutt, 2nd Baron Belper (1840–1914), Captain of the Honourable Corps of Gentlemen-at-Arms (1895–1905)
- John Stuart, 1st Marquess of Bute (1744–1814), MP for Bossiney (1766–1776)
- George Holme Sumner (1760–1838), MP for Ilchester, Guildford and Surrey
- Henry Surtees (1819–1895), MP for Hertfordshire (1864–1868)
- Harold Sutcliffe (1897–1958), Conservative MP for Royton (1931–1950) and Heywood and Royton (1950–1955)
- George Sutherland-Leveson-Gower, 2nd Duke of Sutherland (1786–1861), MP for St Mawes (1808–1812), Newcastle-under-Lyme (1812–1815) and Staffordshire (1815–1820), and first-class cricketer
- Thomas Tapling (1855–1891), MP for Harborough (1886–1891) and philatelist
- Charles Tennant (1796–1873), MP for St Albans (1830–1831)
- Peter Thellusson, 1st Baron Rendlesham (1761–1808), MP for Midhurst (1795–1796), Malmesbury (1796–1802), Castle Rising (1802–1806) and Bossiney (1807–1808)
- Thomas Charles Thompson (1821–1892), MP for City of Durham (1874; 1880–1885)
- Percy Thornton (1841–1918), Conservative MP for Clapham (1892–1910)
- Henry Thynne, 6th Marquess of Bath (1905–1992), MP for Frome (1931–1935)
- Thomas Tower (1698?–1778), MP for Wareham (1729–1734) and Wallingford (1734–1741)
- Edmund Turnor (1838–1903), MP for Grantham (1868) and South Lincolnshire (1868–1880)
- Thomas Usborne (1840–1915), Conservative MP for Chelmsford (1892–1900)
- Crofton Moore Vandeleur (1809–1881), MP for County Clare (1859–1874)
- Matthew Vaughan-Davies, 1st Baron Ystwyth (1840–1935), Liberal MP for Cardiganshire (1895–1921)
- John Vereker, 3rd Viscount Gort (1790–1865), Irish MP for Limerick (1817–1820)
- Sir Edmund Verney, 3rd Baronet (1838–1910), Liberal MP for Buckingham (1885–1886; 1889–1891)
- Frederick Verney (1846–1913), Liberal MP for Buckingham (1906–1910)
- Sir Harry Verney, 2nd Baronet (1801–1894), Liberal MP for Buckingham (1832–1841; 1857–1874; 1880–1885) and Bedford (1847–1852)
- Bruce Vernon-Wentworth (1862–1951), Conservative MP for Brighton (1893–1906)
- John Waller (1762/1763–1836), MP for County Limerick (1798–1801) and County Limerick (1801–1818)
- Gwyllym Lloyd Wardle (c. 1762–1833), MP for Okehampton (1807–1812)
- John Ashley Warre (1787–1860), MP for Lostwithiel (1812–1818), Taunton (1820–1826), Hastings (1831–1834), and Ripon (1857–1860)
- John Lloyd Vaughan Watkins (1802–1865), Liberal MP for Brecon (1832–1835; 1847–1852; 1864–1865)
- Cecil Weld-Forester, 5th Baron Forester (1842–1917), Conservative MP for Wenlock (1874–1885)
- William Wells (1818–1889), Liberal MP for Beverley (1852–1857) and Peterborough (1868–1874)
- Frederick West (1767–1852), MP for Denbigh Boroughs (1801–1806)
- Arthur Walters Wills (1868–1948), Liberal MP for North Dorset (1905–1910)
- Mathew Wilson (1802–1891), Liberal MP for Clitheroe (1841–1842; 1847–1853), Northern West Riding of Yorkshire (1874–1885), and Skipton (1885–1886)
- Sir Mathew Wilson, 4th Baronet (1875–1958), MP for Bethnal Green South West (1914–1922)
- Thomas Wood (1777–1860), Tory-turned-Conservative MP for Breconshire (1806–1847)
- Thomas Wood (1804–1872), Conservative MP for Middlesex (1837–1847)
- Philip Wroughton (1846–1910), Conservative MP for Berkshire (1876–1885) and Abington (1885–1895)
- William Wyndham (1796–1862), Whig MP for South Wiltshire (1852–1859)
- Robert Yerburgh (1853–1916), Conservative MP for Chester (1886–1906; 1910–1916)
- Robert Yerburgh, 1st Baron Alvingham (1889–1955), Conservative MP for South Dorset (1922–1929)
- Philip Yorke, Viscount Royston (1784–1808), MP for Reigate (1806–1808)

==== Foreign politicians and MEPs ====
- John Acland (1923–1904), Member of the New Zealand Legislative Council (1865–1899)
- Antony Alcock (1936–2006), Northern Irish historian and member of the 1996 Northern Ireland Forum
- Harold Barbour (1874–1938), Northern Ireland Senator (1921–1929)
- Martin Gilbert Barrow (1944–), appointed unofficial member of the Legislative Council of Hong Kong (1988–1995)
- Nicholas Bethell, 4th Baron Bethell (1938–2007), historian of Central and Eastern Europe, translator of Russian/Polish works into the English language, Member of the European Parliament (1979–1994; 1999–2003)
- John Brudenell-Bruce (1885–1960), diplomat and member of the House of Assembly of the British Virgin Islands
- Nugent Everard (1849–1929), Lord Lieutenant of Meath (1906–1922) and member of Seanad Éireann (1922–1928; 1929)
- Per Federspiel (1905–1994), Danish politician, member of the Folketing and Landstinget, and President of the Parliamentary Assembly of the Council of Europe (1960–1963)
- William John Warburton Hamilton (1825–1883), Canterbury Provincial Councillor
- Edward Wingfield Humphreys (1841–1892), New Zealand MP for Christchurch North (1889–1890)
- Thomas Hutton-Mills Sr. (1865–1931), member of the Legislative Council of the Gold Coast and the first president of the National Congress of British West Africa
- Charles Hayward Izard (1862–1925), New Zealand MP for Wellington North (1905–1908)
- Sir Alexander Matheson, 3rd Baronet (1861–1929), Australian Senator from Western Australia (1901–1906)
- Archie Michaelis (1889–1975), Speaker of the Victorian Legislative Assembly (1950–1952)
- Arthur Middleton (1742–1787), signer of the United States Declaration of Independence
- Robert Ramsay (1818–1910), Treasurer of Queensland (1870–1871)
- Rupert Ryan (1884–1952), Australian MP for Flinders (1940–1952)
- Sir Peter Smithers (1913–2006), Secretary General of the Council of Europe (1964–1969)
- Madron Seligman (1918–2002), MEP
- Adlai Stevenson III (1930–), Treasurer of Illinois (1967–1970) and U.S. Senator from Illinois (1970–1981)
- Geoffrey Taylour, 4th Marquess of Headfort (1878–1943), member of Seanad Éireann (1922–1928)
- Edward Deas Thomson (1800–1879), Colonial Secretary of New South Wales (1837–1856) and Chancellor of the University of Sydney (1865–1878)
- Maxwell Ward, 6th Viscount Bangor (1868–1950), Deputy Leader of the Senate of Northern Ireland (1929–1930)
- Henry Wigram (1857–1934), Mayor of Christchurch (1902–1904) known for his role in establishing the Royal New Zealand Air Force

==== Other politicians ====
- Jack Ainslie (1921–2007), Chairman of Wiltshire County Council (1986–1990)
- Gavyn Arthur (1951–2016), judge, Lord Mayor of London (2002–2003)
- Ewen Cameron, Baron Cameron of Dillington (born 1949), cross-bench life peer and High Sheriff of Somerset (1986)
- George Gordon, 2nd Marquess of Aberdeen and Temair (1879–1965), Lord Lieutenant of Aberdeenshire (1934–1959) and London County Councillor
- John Gurney (1845–1887), Mayor of Norwich
- William Henry Holmes Lyons (1843–1924), High Sheriff of Antrim (1904) and prominent Ulster unionist
- Derek Moore-Brabazon, 2nd Baron Brabazon of Tara (1910–1974), Kensington Metropolitan Borough Councillor and peer
- Paul Newall (1934–2015), Lord Mayor of London (1993–1994)
- Alexander Rolls (1818–1882), Mayor of Monmouth and husband of Helen Barry
- Joseph Savory (1843–1921), Lord Mayor of London (1890–1891)
- Michael Savory (born 1943), Lord Mayor of London (2004–2005)
- Albert Spencer, 7th Earl Spencer (1892–1975), Conservative councillor and peer
- Sir Peter Malden Studd (1916–2003), Lord Mayor of London (1970–1971)
- Alan Yarrow (born 1951), Lord Mayor of London (2014–2015)

==== Activists, humanitarians, philanthropists ====
- Peter Caddy (1917–1994), British hotelier who was a co-founder of Findhorn Foundation
- Len De Caux (1899–1991), British-American labour activist who worked to stop the Taft–Hartley Act of 1947
- John Furley (1836–1919), English humanitarian and a founder of St John Ambulance
- Sir Basil Henriques (1890–1961), philanthropist
- Arnold Hills (1857–1927), English promoter of vegetarianism and first president of the London Vegetarian Society
- Rodney Leach, Baron Leach of Fairford (1934–2016), chairman of Open Europe and NOtoAV
- Richard Martin (1754–1834), activist for animal rights who, as MP for County Galway, brought the Cruel Treatment of Cattle Act 1822 into law
- Sir William Worsley, 6th Baronet (1956–), Chairman of The National Forest and nephew of Katharine, Duchess of Kent

=== Other nobility ===
- Sir Fulque Agnew, 10th Baronet (1900–1975). University administrator in South Africa and anti-apartheid activist.
- James Alexander, 4th Earl of Caledon (1846–1898)
- Shane Alexander, 2nd Earl Alexander of Tunis (1935–)
- John Boyle, 14th Earl of Cork (1916–2003)
- Sir Charles Bracewell-Smith, 4th Baronet (1955–)
- George Bridgeman, 2nd Earl of Bradford (1789–1865)
- Victor Brooke, 3rd Viscount Alanbrooke (1932–2018)
- Urban Huttleston Broughton, 1st Baron Fairhaven (1896–1966)
- Arthur Butler, 4th Marquess of Ormonde (1849–1943)
- Charles Carnegie, 10th Earl of Southesk (1854–1941)
- Henry Cavendish, 4th Baron Waterpark (1839–1912)
- Robin Cayzer, 3rd Baron Rotherwick (1954–), elected peer to the House of Lords
- Dermot Chichester, 7th Marquess of Donegall (1916–2007), British peer
- Patrick Chichester, 8th Marquess of Donegall (1952–), Irish peer
- Charles Colville, 2nd Viscount Colville of Culross (1854–1928)
- Sir Geoffrey Cory-Wright, 3rd Baronet (1892–1969)
- John Crichton-Stuart, 3rd Marquess of Bute (1847–1900), English aristocrat involved in Re Cardiff Savings Bank
- John Crichton-Stuart, 4th Marquess of Bute (1811–1947), Scottish peer who restored Caerphilly Castle
- John Dalrymple, 14th Earl of Stair (1961–), crossbench peer in the House of Lords
- Francis Douglas, 11th Marquess of Queensberry (1896–1954), Scottish representative peer in the House of Lords (1922–1929)
- Francis Douglas, Viscount Drumlanrig (1867–1894), Liberal peer in the House of Lords
- Mark Dundas, 4th Marquess of Zetland (1937–)
- Lieutenant-Colonel Frederick Eveleigh-de-Moleyns, 5th Baron Ventry (1861–1923)
- Sir Adrian FitzGerald, 24th Knight of Kerry (1940–)
- Henry FitzRoy, 12th Duke of Grafton (1978–)
- Simon Fraser, 16th Lord Lovat (1977–), chief of Clan Fraser of Lovat
- Alexander Gordon, 7th Marquess of Aberdeen and Temair (1955–2020)
- Sir Hildebrand Harmsworth, 2nd Baronet (1901–1977)
- Robert Herbert, 12th Earl of Pembroke (1791–1862)
- John Hervey, 7th Marquess of Bristol (1954–1999), British heir who died nearly penniless of a drug overdose
- Sir Henry Hugh Arthur Hoare, 6th Baronet (1865–1947), English landowner who restored Stourhead after a 1902 fire
- Henry Howard, 3rd Earl of Effingham (1837–1898)
- John Howe, 4th Baron Chedworth (1754–1804)
- John Strange Jocelyn, 5th Earl of Roden (1823–1897), Anglo-Irish representative peer and eponym of Winston Churchill's brother
- Richard Long, 4th Viscount Long (1929–2017), Conservative peer
- Godfrey Macdonald, 3rd Baron Macdonald of Sleat (1775–1832)
- Norman MacLeod of MacLeod (1812–1895), 25th Chief of Clan MacLeod
- Norman Magnus MacLeod of MacLeod (1839–1929), 26th Chief of Clan MacLeod
- Reginald MacLeod of MacLeod (1847–1935), 27th Chief of Clan MacLeod
- Lieutenant-Colonel Dudley Marjoribanks, 3rd Baron Tweedmouth (1874–1935)
- Hugh Molyneux, 7th Earl of Sefton (1898–1972)
- Christopher Nevill, 6th Marquess of Abergavenny (1955–)
- Horace Pitt-Rivers, 6th Baron Rivers (1814–1880)
- Arthur Ponsonby, 11th Earl of Bessborough (1912–2002)
- Walter Ponsonby, 7th Earl of Bessborough (1821–1906)
- John Poulett, 5th Earl Poulett (1783–1864)
- Stephen Powys, 6th Baron Lilford (1869–1949)
- Sir Hugh Rankin, 3rd Baronet (1899–1988), President of the British Muslim Society
- Andrew Russell, 15th Duke of Bedford (1962–)
- George Sackville, 4th Duke of Dorset (1793–1815)
- Patrick Seely, 3rd Baron Mottistone (1905–1966)
- David Seyfried-Herbert, 19th Baron Herbert (1952–), British peer who was representative of the Battle of Bosworth Lancastrian peers at the 2015 re-interment of King Richard III
- Henry Seymour, 9th Marquess of Hertford (1958–)
- Charles Spring Rice, 5th Baron Monteagle of Brandon (1867–1946), Conservative peer
- Francis Spring Rice, 4th Baron Monteagle of Brandon (1852–1937)
- Gerald Spring Rice, 6th Baron Monteagle of Brandon (1926–2013)
- Randolph Stewart, 13th Earl of Galloway (1928–)
- St Andrew St John, 15th Baron St John of Bletso (1811–1874)
- Ronald Strutt, 4th Baron Belper (1912–1999),
- James Somerville, 2nd Baron Athlumney (1865–1929)
- James Spencer-Churchill, 12th Duke of Marlborough (1955–)
- Christopher Taylour, 7th Marquess of Headfort (1959–)
- John Vereker, 5th Viscount Gort (1849–1902)
- Other Windsor, 6th Earl of Plymouth (1789–1833)
- Richard John Wrottesley, 5th Baron Wrottesley (1918–1977)

== Naval and military ==
- Air Commodore Sir Charles Jocelyn Hambro (1897–1963)
- Air Commodore Patrick Huskinson (1897–1966)
- Air Chief Marshal Sir Philip Joubert de la Ferté (1887–1965)
- Admiral of the Fleet Sir James Erskine (1838–1911)
- Admiral of the Fleet Sir George Seymour (1787–1870)
- Rear Admiral George Frederick Ryves (1758–1826)
- Rear Admiral Ion Tower (1889–1940)
- Field Marshal Harold Alexander, 1st Earl Alexander of Tunis (1891–1969), Governor General of Canada (1946–1952)
- Field Marshal John Vereker, 6th Viscount Gort (1886–1946), Chief of Imperial General Staff
- Field Marshal Charles Guthrie, Baron Guthrie of Craigiebank (1938–), Chief of the General Staff (1994–1997) and of the Defence Staff (1997–2001)
- Admiral George Brydges Rodney, 1st Baron Rodney (1718–1792)
- Admiral Sir Augustus Clifford (1788–1877), Gentleman Usher of the Black Rod (1832–1877)
- Admiral Sir Edward Codrington (1770–1851), fought in the Battle of Trafalgar and Battle of Navarino, and MP for Devonport (1832–1839)
- Admiral Sir Henry Codrington (1808–1877)
- Admiral Sir Michael Culme-Seymour, 3rd Baronet (1836–1920)
- Admiral Sir Eliab Harvey MP (1758–1830) of the Battle of Trafalgar
- Admiral William Morier (1790–1864)
- Admiral George Perceval, 6th Earl of Egmont (1794–1874), served on HMS Orion at Trafalgar aged eleven
- Admiral Sir Bartholomew Rowley (1764–1811)
- Vice Admiral Sir Michael Fell (1918–1976), Flag Officer, Aircraft Carriers (1968–1970)
- General Sir Thomas Riddell-Webster (1886–1974), Quartermaster General to the Forces (1942–1946)
- General Sir Walter Congreve VC (1862–1927)
- General Sir Edward Bowater (1787–1861), also Groom in Waiting in Ordinary (1846–1861)
- General Sir Alexander Robert Badcock (1844–1907)
- General Sir George Berkeley (1785–1857)
- General Sir Robert Brownrigg (1758–1833), Quartermaster-General to the Forces (1803–1811) and Governor of Ceylon (1812–1820)
- General Sir Peter de la Billière (1934–)
- General Edward Henry Clive (1837–1916)
- General Sir Moore Disney (1765–1846)
- General Lord Charles FitzRoy MP (1764–1829)
- General Bernard Hale (1725?–1798), Colonel of the 20th Regiment of Foot (1769–1773)
- General Sir Richard Harrison (1837–1931), Inspector-General of Fortifications (1898–1903)
- General Henry Horne, 1st Baron Horne (1861–1929), only British artillery officer to command an army in the First World War
- General Sir Herbert Lawrence (1861–1943)
- General Sir Henry Mackinnon (1852–1929), General Officer Commanding the Western Command (1910–1916)
- General Sir Rodney Moore (1905–1985)
- General Lord Alexander Russell (1821–1907)
- General Francis Seymour, 5th Marquess of Hertford (1812–1884), Lord Chamberlain to Queen Victoria (1874–1879)
- General Sir Horace Smith-Dorrien (1858–1930)
- General Sir George Alexander Weir (1876–1951)
- General Sir Lashmer Whistler (1898–1963)
- Vice-Admiral Sir Peter Berger (1925–2003)
- Vice-Admiral the Hon. Charles Orlando Bridgeman (1791–1860)
- Vice-Admiral of the Red George Eyre (1782–1839)
- Vice-Admiral Richard Saunders Dundas (1802–1861), First Sea Lord (1857–1858; 1859–1861)
- Lieutenant-General Everard Bouverie (1789–1871)
- Lieutenant General James Brudenell, 7th Earl of Cardigan (1797–1868), Leader of the Charge of the Light Brigade at the Battle of Balaclava
- Lieutenant General Sir Chandos Blair (1919–2011)
- Lieutenant General Sir Richard Butler (1870–1935)
- Lieutenant General Sir Alfred Codrington (1854–1945)
- Lieutenant General Sir Sidney Clive (1874–1959)
- Lieutenant General Sir Harry Calvert (1763–1826), 1st Baronet
- Lieutenant General Sir Anthony Denison-Smith (1942–)
- Lieutenant General Sir Edward Locke Elliot (1850–1938)
- Lieutenant General William Gott (1897–1942), Appointed commander of Eighth Army before dying in air crash
- Lieutenant General Sir Charles Kavanagh (1864–1950)
- Lieutenant General Sir Brian Kimmins (1899–1979)
- Lieutenant General Francis Lloyd (1853–1926), General Officer Commanding London District (1913–1918)
- Lieutenant-General Robert Ballard Long (1771–1825), Peninsular War cavalry commander
- Lieutenant General Sir Arthur Lyttelton-Annesley (1837–1926), Commander-in-Chief, Scotland
- Lieutenant-General James Wolfe Murray (1853–1919), Chief of the Imperial General Staff (1914–1915)
- Lieutenant General William Rous (1939–1999), Quartermaster-General to the Forces (1994–1996)
- Lieutenant General Hussey Vivian, 1st Baron Vivian (1775–1842)
- Lieutenant-General William Warre (1784–1853)
- Major-General Hon. Edward Acheson (1844–1921)
- Major-General Sir Allan Adair, 6th Baronet (1897–1988), Colonel of the Grenadier Guards (1961–1974)
- Major-General Sir Jack d'Avigdor-Goldsmid (1912–1987), 3rd Baronet
- Major-General Sir Henry d'Avigdor-Goldsmid (1909–1976), 2nd Baronet
- Major-General John Talbot Coke (1841–1912)
- Major-General Sir George Cooke (1766–1837)
- Major-General Sir Percy Cox (1864–1937)
- Major-General Sir John Davidson (1876–1954), MP for Fareham (1918–1931)
- Major-General Sir James Syme Drew (1883–1955), K.B.E., C.B., D.S.O., M.C., D.L., Colonel of the Queen's Own Cameron Highlanders (1943–1951)
- Major-General James Bucknall Bucknall Estcourt MP (1803–1855), involved in the Webster–Ashburton Treaty
- Major-General Robert Garrett (1794–1869), Commander British Forces in Hong Kong (1854–1857)
- Major-General Francis Hoare (1879–1959), Director Air Services of the South African Air Force (1937)
- Major-General Spencer Edmund Hollond (1874–1950)
- Major-General Sir George Kemball (1858–1941)
- Major-General Herman Landon (1859–1948)
- Major-General Eric Miles (1891–1977), General Officer Commanding the South Eastern Command (1944)
- Major General Gilbert Monckton, 2nd Viscount Monckton of Brenchley (1915–2006)
- Major-General Harold de Riemer Morgan (1888–1964), General Officer Commanding the 45th Infantry Division (1941–1943) and Colonel of the Royal Northumberland Fusiliers (1947–1953)
- Major-General Cosmo Nevill (1907–2002), General Officer Commanding the 2nd Infantry Division (1956–1958)
- Major-General Oliver Nugent (1860–1926)
- Major-General James Rawlins (1823–1905)
- Major-General Michael Riddell-Webster (1960–), Governor of Edinburgh Castle (2015–2019)
- Major-General Frederick Robb (1858–1948)
- Major General Sir Andrew Hamilton Russell (1868–1960), New Zealand commander at Gallipoli
- Major-General Charles Sackville-West, 6th Earl De La Warr (1815–1873)
- Major-General Sir John Swinton of Kimmerghame (1925–2018), Major-General commanding the Household Division (1976–1979) and father of actress Tilda Swinton
- Major General Philip Tower (1917–2006), Commandant of the Royal Military Academy Sandhurst (1968–1972)
- Major General Russell Upcher (1844–1937)
- Air Vice-Marshal Charles Hubert Boulby Blount (1893–1940)
- Brigadier-General Francis Charles Bridgeman (1846–1917)
- Brigadier-General Charles Granville Bruce (1866–1939)
- Brigadier-General Charles Bulkeley Bulkeley-Johnson (1867–1917)
- Brigadier General Eyre Crabbe (1852–1905)
- Brigadier-General Charles Granville Fortescue (1861–1951)
- Brigadier General Hubert Foster (1855–1919), Chief of the Australian General Staff (1916–1917)
- Brigadier-General Cuthbert Hoare (1883–1969)
- Brigadier-General Harvey Kearsley (1880–1956), courtier in the Household of Queen Elizabeth II
- Brigadier General Walter Long (1879–1917)
- Brigadier-General Horace Sewell (1881–1953), British Army officer known for his mixed race ancestry
- Brigadier Cecil Arthur Harrop Chadwick (1901–1970)
- Brigadier Archer Clive (1903–1995)
- Colonel Guy Brownlow (1883–1960)
- Colonel Frederick Burnaby (1842–1885)
- Colonel Sir William Howe De Lancey (1778–1815), who died of wounds from the Battle of Waterloo
- Colonel Richard Meinertzhagen CBE, DSO (1878–1967)
- Colonel Thomas Wildman (1787–1859), High Sheriff of Nottinghamshire (1821–1822)
- Lieutenant-Colonel Lord Ninian Crichton-Stuart (1883–1915)
- Lieutenant-Colonel Henry George Orlando Bridgeman (1882–1972)
- Lieutenant-Colonel Dudley Gordon, 3rd Marquess of Aberdeen and Temair (1883–1972)
- Lieutenant-Colonel Ivan Lyon (1915–1944), commander Operation Jaywick
- Lieutenant-Colonel Sir Fleetwood Edwards (1842–1910), Keeper of the Privy Purse
- Lieutenant-Colonel Robert Sanders, 1st Baron Bayford (1867–1940)
- Lieutenant-Commander John Boyle, 15th Earl of Cork (1945–), commander of HMS Sealion and elected peer to the House of Lords
- Wing Commander Archie Boyd (1918–2014)
- Major Sir Robert Lister Bower (1860–1929), British Army and Colonial Police Officer
- Major Sir Charles James Buchanan (1899–1984), 4th Baronet
- Major Eric Buller MC (1894–1973), British Army officer and cricketer
- Major Johnnie Cradock (1904–1987)
- Major Sir George FitzGerald, 23rd Knight of Kerry (1917–2001) of the Irish Guards
- Major David Gordon, 4th Marquess of Aberdeen and Temair (1908–1974)
- Major Charles Beck Hornby (1883–1949), believed to be the first British soldier to kill a German soldier in the First World War
- Major David Liddell (1917–2008)
- Major Kenneth McLaren (1860–1924), British army soldier who assisted in the growth of the Scouting movement
- Major Hugh Wyld (1880–1961), British Army officer and cricketer
- Major Francis Yeats-Brown (1886–1944), British cavalry officer and author of The Lives of a Bengal Lancer
- Wing Commander Bertie Hoare (1912–1947), British flying ace of the Second World War
- Squadron Leader Gordon Cleaver (1910–1994)
- Squadron Leader John Crampton (1921–2010)
- Squadron Leader Lord David Douglas-Hamilton (1912–1944)
- Squadron Leader Christopher Riddle (1914–2009)
- Captain George Whatford (1878–1915), cricketer and British and Indian Army officer
- Second Lieutenant Orlando Clive Bridgeman (1898–1931), World War I flying ace credited with five aerial victories
- Lieutenant George Byron, 9th Baron Byron (1855–1917)
- Robert Gregory (1881–1918), Irish flying ace and first-class cricketer
- Henry Tempest Hicks (1852–1922), British soldier
- John Fortescue (1859–1933), military historian
- Anthony Buxton DSO (1881–1970), soldier and author
- Percy Laurie (1880–1962), Provost-Marshal of the United Kingdom (1940–1943)
- Richard Kidder Meade (1746–1805), an aide-de-camp to General George Washington (later U.S. president)
- Constantine Scaramanga-Ralli (1854–1934), British author on compulsory military training
- Charles Tempest-Hicks (1888–1918), English soldier

=== Victoria Cross holders ===
Twenty Old Harrovians have been awarded the Victoria Cross:

- Captain William Peel (1824–1858) (Crimean War)
- Lieutenant Alexander Roberts Dunn (1833–1868) (Crimean War)
- Lieutenant Sir William Montgomery-Cuninghame, 9th Baronet (1834–1897) (Crimean War)
- Colonel John Worthy Chaplin (1840–1920) (Second Opium War)
- Major Edric Gifford, 3rd Baron Gifford (1849–1911) (First Ashanti Expedition)
- Lieutenant Teignmouth Melvill (1842–1879) (Zulu War)
- Lieutenant Percival Marling (1861–1936) (Sudan Campaign)
- Captain Walter Congreve (1862–1927) (South African War)
- Lieutenant Sir John Milbanke, 10th Baronet (1872–1915) (South African War)
- Captain George Rolland (1869–1910) (Third Somaliland Expedition)
- Acting Major George Findlay (1889–1967) (World War I)
- Second Lieutenant William Barnard Rhodes-Moorhouse (1887–1915) (World War I)
- Major Ernest Alexander (1870–1934) (World War I)
- Captain Garth Walford (1882–1915) (World War I)
- Acting Captain Thomas Riversdale Colyer-Fergusson (1896–1917) (World War I)
- Acting Captain Walter Napleton Stone (1891–1917) (World War I)
- Acting Lieutenant Colonel John Standish Surtees Prendergast Vereker (1886–1946) (World War I)
- Captain Richard Raymond Willis (1876–1966) (World War I)
- Temporary Captain Ian Oswald Liddell (1919–1945) (World War II)

== Religion ==
- Nathaniel Alexander (1760–1840), Premier Bishop of Ireland
- Francis Balfour (1846–1924), Assistant Bishop of Bloemenfontein (1910–1924)
- William Bennet (1746–1820), Bishop of Cloyne (1794–1820)
- George Blenkin (1861–1924), Dean of St Albans
- John William Bowden (1798–1844), English church writer
- Edward Burroughs (1882–1934), Bishop of Ripon
- Arthur Buxton (1882–1958), Chaplain to the Forces and Rector of All Souls, Langham Place
- Barclay Fowell Buxton (1860–1946), missionary in Japan
- Harold Buxton (1880–1976), Bishop in Europe
- Randall Davidson (1848–1930), Archbishop of Canterbury
- Paul de Labilliere (1879–1946), Dean of Westminster
- Henry Drummond FRS MP (1786–1860), Catholic Apostolic Church founder
- Henry Drury (1812–1863), Archdeacon of Wiltshire (1862–1863) and Chaplain to the Speaker of the House of Commons
- Edward Carr Glyn (1843–1928), Bishop of Peterborough
- Wilfrid Gore Browne (1859–1928), Bishop of Kimberley and Kuruman
- Anthony Hamilton (1739–1812), Archdeacon of Colchester
- Bernard Heywood (1871–1960), Bishop of Ely
- Nugent Hicks (1872–1942), Bishop of Gibraltar, later Bishop of Lincoln
- John Hill (1862–1943), Bishop of Hulme
- Henry Jenner (1820–1898), disputed Bishop of Dunedin
- Wentworth Leigh (1838–1923), Dean of Hereford
- Angus Campbell MacInnes (1901–1977), Archbishop of Jerusalem
- Rennie MacInnes (1870–1931), bishop
- Michael Mann (1924–2011), emeritus Dean of Windsor
- Charles Merivale (1808–1893), clergyman and historian
- George Murray (1784–1860), bishop of Rochester
- Henry Pepys (1783–1860), Bishop of Worcester (1841–1860)
- Hugh Pearson (1817–1882), Canon of Windsor (1876–1882)
- Charles Perry (1807–1891), Bishop of Melbourne
- Horatio Powys (1805–1877), Bishop of Sodor and Man (1854–1877)
- Robert Selby Taylor (1909–1995), Archbishop of Cape Town
- Humphrey Southern (1960–), Bishop of Repton (2007–2015)
- Henry Stuart (1864–1933), Dean of Carlisle
- Hugh Tollemache (1802–1890), priest
- Power Le Poer Trench (1770–1839), Archbishop of Tuam (1819–1839)
- Gerald Vesey (1832–1915), archdeacon
- Ernest Wilberforce (1840–1907), Bishop of Chichester
- Charles Wordsworth (1806–1892), Bishop of St Andrews, Dunkeld and Dunblane (1853–1892)

=== Anglican clergy ===
- Alfred Blomfield (1833–1894), Bishop of Colchester (1882–1894)
- Hilton Bothamley (?–1919), Archdeacon of Bath (1895–1909)
- Howel Brown (1856–1928), Provost of St Mary's Cathedral, Glasgow (1890–1904)
- Whitfield Daukes (1877–1954), Bishop of Plymouth (1934–1950)
- Henry Dawson (1792–1840), Dean of St Patrick's Cathedral, Dublin (1828–1842)
- Brook Deedes (1847–1922), Archdeacon of Hampstead (1912–1920)
- Percy Derry (1859–1928), Archdeacon of Auckland (1914–1928)
- Robert Dolling (1851–1902), Anglican priest
- Edward Dowler (1967–), Archdeacon of Hastings (2016–)
- Henry Du Boulay (1840–1925), Archdeacon of Bodmin (1892–1923)
- Edward Every (1862–1941), Bishop of the Falkland Islands (1902–1910)
- Lancelot Fish (1861–1924), Archdeacon of Bath (1909–1924)
- George Fisher (1844–1921), Bishop of Southampton (1896–1899) and Bishop of Ipswich (1899–1906)
- Charles Gore (1853–1932), Bishop of Worcester (1902–1905), Bishop of Birmingham (1905–1911), and Bishop of Oxford (1911–1919)
- Hartwell de la Garde Grissell (1839–1907), papal chamberlain
- Henry Haigh (1837–1906), Archdeacon of the Isle of Wight (1886–1906)
- Frederick Hulton-Sams (1882–1915), Anglican priest
- John Law (1739–1827), Archdeacon of Rochester (1767–1827)
- Newton Leeke (1854–1933), Archdeacon of Totnes (1921–1933)
- Richard Wickham Legg (1867–1952), Archdeacon of Berkshire (1922–1942)
- William Leigh (1752–1808), Dean of Hereford (1807–1808)
- Philip Micklem (1876–1965), Provost of Derby (1937–1947)
- Eric Milner-White (1884–1963), Dean of York (1941–1963) and a founder of the Oratory of the Good Shepherd
- Henry Montgomery (1847–1932), Bishop of Tasmania (1889–1901) and father of the Spartan General
- Nathaniel Newnham Davis (1903–1966), Bishop of Antigua (1944–1952)
- Ashton Oxenden (1808–1892), Bishop of Montreal (1869–1878)
- James Peile (1863–1940), Archdeacon of Warwick (1910–1921) and Archdeacon of Worcester (1921–1938)
- Herbert Pelham (1881–1944), Bishop of Barrow-in-Furness (1926–1944)
- Benjamin Plunket (1870–1947), Bishop of Tuam, Killala and Achonry (1913–1919) and Bishop of Meath (1919–1925)
- Ernest Reid (?–1966), Archdeacon of Hastings (1938–1956)
- William Rigg (1877–1966), Archdeacon of Bodmin (1939–1952)
- Lucius Smith (1860–1934), Bishop of Knaresborough (1905–1934)
- John Stroyan (1955–), Bishop of Warwick (2005–)
- Humphrey Taylor (1938–), Bishop of Selby (1991–2003)
- Barry Till (1923–2013), Dean of Hong Kong and Principal of Morley College
- Richard Chenevix Trench (1807–1886), Anglican Archbishop of Dublin
- Stephen Verney (1919–2009), Bishop of Repton (1977–1985)
- Ian White-Thomson (1904–1997), Dean of Canterbury (1963–1976)

=== Catholic clergy ===
- Robert Aston Coffin (1819–1885), Roman Catholic Bishop of Southwark (1882–1885)
- Frederick William Faber (1814–1863), Roman Catholic convert, author, and hymn-writer (Faith of Our Fathers)
- Henry Edward Manning (1808–1892), Archbishop of Westminster (1865–1892)
- Thomas Wilkinson (1825–1909), Bishop of Hexham and Newcastle (1889–1909) and President of Ushaw College

=== Other clergy ===
- Maxwell Craig (1931–2009), General Secretary of Action of Churches Together in Scotland

=== Theologians and religious scholars ===
- Andrew Jukes (1815–1901), English theologian
- John Morris (1826–1893), English Jesuit priest and church history scholar
- Henry Nutcombe Oxenham (1829–1888), English ecclesiologist
- Oliver Chase Quick (1885–1944), English theologian
- Francis Chenevix Trench (1805–1886), English theologian
- Isaac Williams (1802–1865), Welsh theologian

== Arts ==
=== Journalism and media ===
- Crispin Black (1960–), British intelligence commentator and Falklands War veteran
- David Buik (1944–), financial pundit for the BBC and other channels
- Aidan Crawley MP (1908–1993), British television executive, journalist, and MP
- Walter Burton Harris (1866–1933), English journalist who wrote on Morocco where he was a special correspondent for The Times
- Austin Harrison (1873–1928), British journalist and editor of The English Review (1909–1923)
- Edward George Warris Hulton (1906–1988), British magazine publisher and founder of Hulton Archive
- Gervase Jackson-Stops (1947–1995), British journalist and architectural historian for Country Life
- Nick Luck (1978–), English racing broadcaster who was presenter of Channel 4 Racing
- Hugh Massingberd (1946–2007), English journalist and genealogist, obituaries editor for The Daily Telegraph, chief editor at Burke's Peerage
- Leopold Maxse (1864–1932), editor of the National Review (1893–1932), who played at the 1883 Wimbledon Championship
- John McCririck (1940–2019), English journalist and horse racing pundit
- Raphael Minder (1971–), Swiss journalist and author on Catalonia
- Jeremy Norman (1947–), English journalist
- Remington Norman, wine critic
- Jason Pontin (1967–), editor, publisher, and journalist
- Sir Douglas Straight MP (1844–1914), journalist and judge
- Herbert Vivian (1865–1940), British journalist, writer, and newspaper proprietor
- Edward Ward, 7th Viscount Bangor (1905–1993), Anglo-Irish war correspondent
- Francis Wheen (1957–), British journalist and writer
- Dorian Williams (1914–1985), British equestrian broadcaster
- Julian Wilson (1940–2014), BBC racing commentator (1966–1997)

=== Writers, poets, and philosophers ===
- George Barlow (1847–1913–4), English poet
- Edward William Barnard (1791–1828), English poet
- Bernard Bosanquet (1848–1923), philosopher
- Beriah Botfield (1807–1863), bibliographer and Conservative MP for Ludlow (1840–1847; 1857–1863)
- Harry Bucknall (1965–), British travel writer
- Francis Crawford Burkitt (1864–1935), theologian and scholar
- Arthur Hugh Montagu Butler (1873–1943), House of Lords Librarian (1914–1922)
- George Gordon Byron, 6th Baron Byron (1788–1824), poet, commonly known as Lord Byron
- Charles Stuart Calverley (1831–1884), poet
- Francis Chenevix Trench (1805–1886), author and divine
- Wilfred Rowland Childe (1890–1952), poet
- Charles Travis Clay (1885–1978), House of Lords Librarian (1922–1956)
- Sir Jock Colville (1915–1987), Diarist at 10 Downing Street
- William John Courthope (1842–1917), English writer and historian of poetry
- Richard Curtis (1956–), scriptwriter & film director
- Alain de Botton (1969–), author
- John Dennis (1658–1734), English dramatist
- George Brisbane Scott Douglas (1856–1935), Scottish poet and writer
- Henry Drury (1778–1841), English classical scholar and friend of Lord Byron
- Julian Fane (1927–2009), author
- Michael Farr (1953–), British expert on The Adventures of Tintin and its creator Hergé
- Alastair Fothergill (1960–), British producer
- Walter Frith (1856–1941), novelist
- John Galsworthy (1867–1933), dramatist and Nobel Prize–winning novelist
- William Gibson, 2nd Baron Ashbourne (1868–1942), president of the Irish Literary Society who was disinherited due to his Irish nationalist leanings
- Thomas Gisborne (1758–1846), English poet of the Clapham Sect
- John Strickland Goodall (1908–1996), British author and watercolour painter known for his Boston Globe–Horn Book Award-winning The Adventures of Paddy Pork
- Augustus Hare (1834–1903), author
- Tony Harman (1912–1999), English farmer and author (Seventy Summers)
- L. P. Hartley (1895–1972), author
- William Harness (1790–1869), English cleric and man of letters
- Carey Harrison (1944–), English novelist and dramatist
- Walter Headlam (1866–1908), poet and classical scholar
- Edward Heron-Allen (1861–1943), English polymath and translator of the works of Omar Khayyam
- Theodore Hook (1788–1841), author
- Adam Jacot de Boinod (1960–), British author known for his works about unusual words and his work in the first series of QI
- Harold H. Joachim (1868–1938), British philosopher
- Ion Keith-Falconer (1856–1887), Scottish Arabic language scholar
- Hugh Kingsmill (1899–1949), British writer of science/crime fiction
- Rowley Lascelles (1771–1841), archivist
- Walter Leaf (1852–1927), classical scholar
- Chandos Leigh, 1st Baron Leigh (1791–1850), British landowner and poet
- Thomas Leveritt (1976–), English author and artist
- Sir Arnold Lunn (1888–1974), skiing pioneer & writer
- Richard Warburton Lytton (1745–1810), English bibliophile and landowner
- Benjamin Heath Malkin (1769–1842), British writer known for his connection to William Blake
- Francis Albert Marshall (1840–1889), British playwright
- Ronald Brunlees McKerrow (1872–1940), bibliographer
- Herman Charles Merivale (1839–1906), dramatist and poet
- E. H. W. Meyerstein (1889–1952), poet and writer
- George Mills (1896–1972), British children's author
- Charles Henry Monro (1835–1908), English author
- Sir John Mortimer (1923–2009), dramatist and author
- Thomas Mortimer (1730–1810), English writer on economics
- J. B. Morton (1893–1979), English writer under the Beachcomber pen name
- Nathaniel Newnham-Davis (1854–1917), British author on food and wine
- Roden Noel (1834–1894), English poet
- Marco Pallis (1895–1989), Greek-British author on Tibetan Buddhism
- William Henley Pearson-Jervis (1813–1883), English cleric and ecclesiastical historian of France
- Major-General Thomas Pilcher (1858–1928), British Army officer removed from command in disgrace during the Battle of the Somme
- Henry Francis Pelham (1846–1907), scholar
- John Thomas Perceval (1803–1876), writer and campaigner
- Marmaduke Pickthall (1875–1936), Islamic and Middle-Eastern scholar
- Bryan Procter alias "Barry Cornwall" (1787–1874), English poet and Commissioner in Lunacy
- Robert Hebert Quick (1831–1891), English educator and leader in Whig history
- Hastings Rashdall (1858–1924), English philosopher and pioneer of ideal utilitarianism
- Sir Terence Rattigan (1911–1977), dramatist
- Ian Scott-Kilvert (1917–1989), British editor and translator
- Hugh Sebag-Montefiore (1955–), British writer
- William Seward (1747–1799), anecdotist
- Richard Brinsley Sheridan MP (1751–1816), Irish playwright (The Rivals, The School for Scandal, The Duenna, and A Trip to Scarborough) and politician
- Walter Sichel (1855–1933), English biographer and lawyer
- William Sotheby (1757–1833), English poet and translator
- William Robert Spencer (1769–1834), English poet from the Spencer family
- Percy Smythe, 8th Viscount Strangford (1825–1869), British Nobleman & man of letters
- John Addington Symonds (1840–1893), poet and literary critic
- Yorick Smythies (1917–1980), philosopher
- R. C. Trevelyan (1872–1951), poet
- Anthony Trollope (1815–1882), English Victorian era novelist
- Thomas Adolphus Trollope (1810–1892), English writer who lived in Italy (Chronicles of Barsetshire)
- Horace Annesley Vachell (1861–1955), English writer
- Sir Aubrey de Vere, 2nd Baronet (1788–1846), Anglo-Irish poet and landowner
- Peter Williams (1914–1995), author, editor and critic of ballet
- Robert Aris Willmott (1809–1863), English cleric and author
- Dornford Yates (Cecil William Mercer, 1885–1960), novelist

=== Architecture ===
- Eustace Balfour (1854–1911), Scottish architect and brother of PM Arthur Balfour
- Serge Chermayeff (1900–1996), Russian-born British architect
- Patrick Gwynne (1913–2003), British modernist architect who designed The Homewood
- Sir Anthony Minoprio (1900–1988), British architect and town planner who worked on the Crawley new town
- Harold Peto (1854–1933), British architect and garden designer
- Edward Schroeder Prior (1852–1932), British architect and a figure in the Arts and Crafts movement
- Richard Gilbert Scott (1923–2017), British architect who designed Our Lady Help of Christians Church, Tile Cross and great-grandson of George Gilbert Scott
- John Seely, 2nd Baron Mottistone (1899–1963), British architect who restored several bomb-damaged buildings and designed the Eltham Palace interior
- Hugh Spencely (1900–1983), British architect who designed Fairacres, Roehampton
- Richard de Yarburgh-Bateson, 6th Baron Deramore (1911–2006), British architect

=== Visual arts ===
- Patrick Anson, 5th Earl of Lichfield (1939–2005), photographer
- Sir Claude Francis Barry, 3rd Baronet (1883–1970), British etcher and oil painter
- Sir Cecil Beaton (1904–1980), photographer and costume designer
- Sir Oswald Birley (1880–1952), portraitist
- Count Nikolai von Bismarck (1986–), British-German photographer
- Hercules Brabazon Brabazon (1821–1906), 19th century artist
- Rodney Joseph Burn (1899–1984), artist
- Alexander de Cadenet (1974–), British artist
- Charlie Casely-Hayford (1986–), British menswear designer
- Souvid Datta (1990–), British Indian photographer and filmmaker
- Damian Elwes (1960–), artist
- Michael Farrar-Bell (1911–1993), stained glass and postage stamp designer
- Robin Fior (1935–2012), British designer known for his association with radical and libertarian causes
- Richard Foster (painter) (1945–), portraitist
- Alastair Gordon, 6th Marquess of Aberdeen and Temair (1920–2002), British botanical artist and art critic
- Spencer Gore (artist) (1878–1914), painter
- Sir Francis Grant (1803–1878), Scottish artist and President of the Royal Academy (1866–1878)
- General Douglas Hamilton (1818–1892), artist and game hunter
- Richard Harrison (1954–), English painter
- Nicholas Hely Hutchinson (1955–), artist
- Eliot Hodgkin (1905–1987), artist
- George W. Joy (1844–1925), Irish painter
- Henry Monro (1791–1814), British painter
- Dermod O'Brien (1865–1945), Irish painter and High Sheriff of County Limerick (1916)
- Victor Pasmore (1908–1998), artist
- Edward Tennyson Reed (1860–1933), illustrator and cartoonist
- Hugh Riddle (1912–2009), RAF pilot and portraitist
- Lincoln Seligman (1950–), artist
- Sir Geoffrey Shakerley (1932–2012), 6th Baronet, photographer
- John Spencer-Churchill (1909–1992), English painter, sculptor, and nephew of Winston Churchill
- Henry Fox Talbot (1800–1877), English photography pioneer who invented of salt paper photography
- John Frederick Tayler (1802–1889), President of the Royal Watercolour Society
- Henry Ward (1971–), British painter

=== Arts directors and patrons ===
- Sir Herbert Cook, 3rd Baronet (1868–1939), English art patron and art historian
- Hew Hamilton Dalrymple (1857–1945), Chairman of the National Galleries of Scotland Trustees (1930–1944) and MP for Wigtownshire (1915–1918)
- David Charles Erskine (1866–1922), Chairman of the National Galleries of Scotland Board of Trustees and Liberal MP for West Perthshire (1906–1910)
- Arthur Jeffress (1905–1961), British art patron and one of the bright young things
- Jack Phipps (1925–2010), British arts administrator
- Greville Poke (1912–2000), a founder of The English Stage Company
- Ralph Radcliffe Whitehead (1854–1929), benefactor of the Byrdcliffe Arts and Crafts Colony

=== Actors and personalities ===
- George Arliss (1868–1946), English actor who was the first British winner of an Academy Award
- Maurice Barrymore (1849–1905), British stage actor and patriarch of the Barrymore family
- Max Benitz (1985–), British actor best known for starring in Master and Commander: The Far Side of the World and his Hindustan Ambassador journey
- Timothy Bentinck (1953–), English actor best known for voicing David Archer in The Archers
- James Callis (1971–), English actor
- Peter Cellier (1928–), English actor who plays Sir Frank Gordon in Yes Minister and Yes, Prime Minister
- Benedict Cumberbatch (1976–), English actor
- Michael Denison (1915–1998), English actor who appeared in several films with his wife Dulcie Gray
- James Dreyfus (1968–), English actor who played Constable Kevin Goody in The Thin Blue Line and Tom Farrell in Gimme Gimme Gimme
- Sir Gerald du Maurier (1873–1934), English actor-manager
- Valentine Dyall (1908–1985), English actor who narrated Appointment with Fear on BBC Radio
- Cary Elwes (1962–), English actor and writer
- Max Fosh (1995–), English YouTuber and comedian
- Edward Fox (1937–), English actor
- James Fox (1939–), English actor who won a BAFTA Award for The Servant
- Laurence Fox (1978–), English actor who played Sergeant Hathaway in Lewis
- Nicholas Frankau (1954–), actor
- Peter Graves, 8th Baron Graves (1911–1994), English actor
- Jeremy Hawk (1918–2002), British character actor who performed in music halls and West End theatre
- Julian Holloway (1944–2025), English actor
- Peter Jeffrey (1929–1999), English actor
- Ben Jones (1972–), British actor who played Dr. Greg Robinson in Doctors
- Tom Macaulay (1906–1979), English Actor (Chambré Thomas Maculay Booth)
- Sir Nigel Playfair (1874–1934), English actor-manager of Lyric Hammersmith
- Robert Portal (1967–), English actor
- Miles Mander (1888–1946), English actor
- Hugo Taylor, British TV personality who appeared in ‘'Made in Chelsea and ‘'I'm A Celebrity...Get Me Out of Here!
- Tate Wilkinson (1739–1803), English actor and manager
- Simon Williams (1946–), English actor who played James Bellamy in Upstairs, Downstairs, playing Charles Cartwright in Don't Wait Up, Charles Merrick in Holby City, and Justin Elliott in The Archers

=== Media producers, directors and writers ===
- Asitha Ameresekere (1971–), British-Sri Lankan filmmaker and writer
- Riza Aziz, Malaysian movie producer of The Wolf of Wall Street
- Henry Bentinck, 11th Earl of Portland (1919–1997), producer of Today
- Andrew Birkin (1945–), screenwriter, director
- Montgomery Blencowe, film producer
- Adrian Brunel (1892–1958), film director
- Bruce Burgess (1968–), documentary filmmaker
- Richard Curtis (1956–), screenwriter, director, producer
- Alastair Fothergill (1960–), producer of nature documentaries
- Robert Fox (1952–), film producer
- Archibald Gordon, 5th Marquess of Aberdeen and Temair (1913–1984), Scottish producer at the BBC
- John Gore (1962–), theatrical producer and founder of John Gore Organization
- Joel Hopkins (1970–), British independent film director
- John Kruse (1921–2004), English screenwriter who worked on The Saint
- Dominic Treadwell-Collins (1977–), British producer and creator of Kat & Alfie: Redwater

=== Music ===
- Mike d'Abo (1944–), lead singer, Manfred Mann
- Chris Blackwell (1937–), founder of Island Records
- James Blunt (1974–), musician
- Herbert Bunning (1863–1937), English composer who produced an opera at the Royal Opera House
- Tarka Cordell (1966–2008), English musician
- Winton Dean (1916–2013), English musicologist who won the 1995 Handel Prize
- Lord David Dundas (1945–), film scorer
- General John Fane, 11th Earl of Westmorland (1784–1859), Founder of the Royal College of Music
- Clement Harris (1871–1897), English pianist and composer
- Walter Jekyll (1849–1929), English clergyman who published Jamaican Song and Story: Annancy Stories, Digging Sings, Ring Tunes, and Dancing Tunes
- William Linley (1771–1835), English musician and son of Thomas Linley the elder
- Ed Lyon, British tenor
- Philip Napier Miles (1865–1935), English opera composer and High Sheriff of Gloucestershire (1916–1917)
- R. O. Morris (1886–1948), British composer who was a professor of counterpoint at the Royal College of Music
- Henry Mountcharles (1951–), host of Slane Concert
- Ian Parrott (1916–2012), composer
- Henry Hugh Pierson (1815–1873), English composer
- James Rhodes (1975–), pianist
- James Ross, conductor
- Aristo Sham (1996–), pianist
- Freddie Stevenson (1980–), singer-songwriter
- Jeremy Suter, Master of the Music of Carlisle Cathedral (1991–2017)
- Simon Toulson-Clarke (1956–), Red Box
- Ben Wallers (1971–), musician
- Sandy Wilson (1924–2014), composer and lyricist
- George Ratcliffe Woodward (1848–1934), English religious composer

== Scientists and academics ==
- Sir Gavin de Beer (1899–1972), British evolutionary embryologist whose book Embryos and Ancestors stressed the importance of heterochrony
- Nathaniel Brassey Halhed (1751–1830), English orientalist
- Tom Harrisson (1911–1976), British polymath
- Michael A. Jackson (1936–), British computer scientist
- William Bence Jones (1812–1882), Anglo-Irish agriculturalist
- Sir William Jones (1746–1794), philologist
- Fletcher Norton (1744–1820), joint founder of the Royal Society of Edinburgh and MP
- Richard Ponsonby-Fane (1878–1937), British Japanologist
- Victor Rothschild, 3rd Baron Rothschild (1910–1990), scientist & civil servant
- Gerald Seligman (1886–1973), president of the International Glaciological Society
- William Spottiswoode (1825–1883), President of the Royal Society
- Sir John Gardner Wilkinson (1797–1875), father of British Egyptology

=== Biologists, botanists and naturalists ===
- Francis Maitland Balfour (1851–1882), professor of animal morphology at Cambridge
- Sir Joseph Banks (1743–1820), English botanist and President of the Royal Society
- Thomas William Barker (1861 – 1912), Welsh solicitor and author of Handbook to the Natural History of Carmarthenshire
- Philip Barker-Webb (1793–1854), English botanist
- Gerald Edwin Hamilton Barrett-Hamilton (1871–1914), natural historian
- Frank Evers Beddard (1858–1925), English zoologist who won the 1916 Linnean Medal
- George Parker Bidder III (1863–1954), British marine biologist and President of the Marine Biological Association of the United Kingdom (1939–1945)
- James Bond (1900–1989), ornithologist
- J. Lewis Bonhote (1875–1922), ornithologist
- Sir Victor Brooke, 3rd Baronet (1843–1891), Anglo-Irish naturalist known for his unfinished work on antelopes in the posthumous The Book of Antelopes
- John Alfred Codrington (1898–1991), British gardener and horticulturist
- Raol Shree Dharmakumarsinhji (1917–1986), Indian prince, ornithologist, environmentalist
- Colonel Heber Drury (1819–1905), British army colonel who wrote several books on botany and is the eponym of paphiopedilum druryi
- James Farish Malcolm Fawcett (1856–?), English entomologist
- Augustus Gough-Calthorpe, 6th Baron Calthorpe (1829–1910), British agriculturist and philanthropist
- Aubrey de Grey (1963–), science of aging
- John Henry Gurney Jr. (1848–1922), British ornithologist
- Frederick Webb Headley (1856–1919), English naturalist and author on Darwinism
- Thomas Henry Manning (1911–1998), Arctic zoologist
- David McClintock (1913–2001), English natural historian and botanist who surveyed the natural history of the garden at Buckingham Palace
- James Cosmo Melvill (1845–1929), British botanist and malacologist who collected thousands of mollusc species
- St. George Jackson Mivart (1827–1900), biologist
- Henry Nottidge Moseley (1844–1891), British natural known for his work at the Challenger expedition
- Frederic Parry (1810–1885), English entomologist
- H. M. Peebles (1872–1944), English entomologist
- John Ponsonby-Fane (1848–1916), English malacologist
- Griffith Pugh (1909–1994), expedition physiologist on the 1953 British Mount Everest expedition
- Alastair Robinson (1980–), British taxonomist and botanist who co-discovered Attenborough's pitcher plant
- Charles Rothschild (1877–1923), entomologist
- Frederick Townsend (1822–1905), British botanist and MP for Stratford-on-Avon (1886–1892)
- Walter Calverley Trevelyan (1797–1879), English naturalist and geologist who published an account of Faroe Islands observations in the New Philosophical Journal
- Bernard Tucker (1901–1950), English ornithologist
- Sir Richard Vyvyan, 8th Baronet (1800–1879), English proto-evolutionary biologist and (Ultra-)Tory MP

=== Chemists and physicists ===
- Sir Benjamin Collins Brodie, 2nd Baronet (1817–1880), English chemist
- Christopher Clayton (1869–1945), Royal Institute of Chemistry (1930–1933) and MP for Widnes (1922–1929) and Wirral (1931–1935)
- Charles Drummond Ellis (1895–1980), English physicist
- William Moffitt (1925–1958), British quantum chemist
- John William Strutt, 3rd Baron Rayleigh (1842–1919), physicist and Nobel Prize laureate, Chancellor of Cambridge University
- David Gilbert Thomas (1928–2015), British chemist who worked at Bell Labs
- Philip James Yorke (1799–1874), British chemist and one of seventy-seven founders of the Chemical Society

=== Engineers and inventors ===
- Sir John Alleyne, 3rd Baronet (1820–1912), British engineer
- Frederick Beaumont (1833–1899), British Royal Engineers officer who invented the Beaumont–Adams revolver and MP for South Durham (1868–1880)
- R. E. B. Crompton (1845–1940), British electrical engineer and pioneer of electric lighting
- Dudley Gordon, 3rd Marquess of Aberdeen and Temair (1883–1972), President of the Institution of Mechanical Engineers (1947)
- Augustus George Vernon Harcourt (1834–1919), English chemist who was one of the first scientists to do quantitative work in the field of chemical kinetics
- Cecil Paget (1874–1936), English locomotive engineer
- Hugh Reeves (1909–1955), British inventor and engineer at Station IX
- George Wightwick Rendel (1833–1902), English engineer and naval architect
- Rowland Macdonald Stephenson (1808–1895), British railway engineer
- Leveson Francis Vernon-Harcourt (1839–1907), British civil engineer and author of several treatises on river and harbour engineering

=== Mathematician and statisticians ===
- Anthony Ashley-Cooper, 7th Earl of Shaftesbury (1801–1885), President of the Royal Statistical Society and peer
- Sir Ronald Fisher (1890–1962), pioneer of statistics
- Sir Charles Lemon, 2nd Baronet, (1784–1868), President of the Royal Statistical Society (1836–1838) and MP
- Sir Richard Martin, 1st Baronet, of Overbury Court (1838–1916), President of the Royal Statistical Society (1906–1907) and Liberal (Unionist) MP for Tewkesbury (1880–1885) and Droitwich (1892–1906)
- Henry Wilbraham (1825–1883), English mathematician

=== Meteorologists, astronomers, and astronauts ===
- Arthur Kett Barclay (1806–1869), British astronomer
- James Capper (1743–1825), British army officer for the East India Company and meteorologist
- Edmund Neville Nevill (1849–1940), British astronomer who wrote The Moon and the Condition and Configuration of its Surface and set up the Natal Observatory
- Nicholas Patrick (1964–), British-American astronaut who flew on the STS-116 mission aboard Space Shuttle Discovery

=== Physicians ===
- Sir Henry Wentworth Dyke-Acland, 1st Baronet, KCB (1815–1900), Professor of Medicine, Physician to Prince of Wales, King Edward VII
- Fereydoun Ala (1931–), Iranian physician and academician
- Hugh Kerr Anderson (1865–1928), British physiologist and Master of Gonville and Caius College, Cambridge (1912–1928)
- Eric Arnott (1929–2011), British ophthalmologist and surgeon who specialized in cataracts
- William Baxter (1650–1723), Welsh scholar
- Walter Broadbent (1868–1951), physician
- Anthony Butterworth FRS, British immunologist
- Sir William Church, 1st Baronet (1837–1928), physician
- William Close (1924–2009), American surgeon who stopped the 1976 Ebola outbreak in Zaire and father of Glenn Close
- Peter Collins (1945–), British academic
- Charles Combe (1743–1817), English physician and numismatist
- Strickland Goodall (1874–1934), British physician and physiologist who is the eponym of the Strickland Goodall Memorial Lecture
- Hamilton Hartridge (1886–1976), British ophthalmologist and medical writer
- Henry Bence Jones (1813–1873), English physician and chemist
- Dr Thomas Monro (1759–1833), British art collector who was physician to King George III
- Huw Thomas (1958–), British doctor and head of the Medical Household
- Charles Theodore Williams (1838–1912), English physician known as a leading authority on pulmonary tuberculosis

=== Educators and institution leaders ===
- George Butler (1819–1890), Principal of Liverpool College
- Henry Montagu Butler (1833–1918), headmaster of Harrow School and Vice-Chancellor of Cambridge University
- Thorold Coade (1896–1963), Headmaster of Bryanston School (1932–1959) and author
- William Cooke (1711–1797), Head Master of Eton College (1743–1745) and Dean of Ely (1780–1797)
- Philip Douglas (1758–1822), Vice-Chancellor of the University of Cambridge
- Sir Alexander Grant, 10th Baronet (1826–1904), Principal of the University of Edinburgh (1868–1885)
- Charles Buller Heberden (1849–1921), Vice-Chancellor of Oxford University
- Gilbert Joyce (1866–1942), Vice-Chancellor of the University of Wales, Lampeter (1916–1923) and Bishop of Monmouth (1928–1940)
- Charles King (1789–1867), President of Columbia University (1849–1864) and New York State Assemblyman (1813–1814)
- Samuel Parr (1747–1825), English schoolmaster and Whig pamphleteer
- Francis William Pember (1862–1954), Vice-Chancellor of Oxford University (1926–1929)
- Gerald Henry Rendall (1851–1945, Vice-Chancellor of Victoria University (UK), and Headmaster of Charterhouse
- Arthur Richard Shilleto (1848–1894), second master of King Edward VI School, Stratford-upon-Avon
- D. C. Somervell (1885–1965), English historian who taught at Repton, Tonbridge and Benenden

=== Historians, antiquarians, archaeologists, and geologists ===
- John Abercromby, 5th Baron Abercromby (1841–1924), Scottish soldier and president of the Society of Antiquaries of Scotland
- C. A. J. Armstrong (1909–1994), English historian of the First Battle of St Albans and the medieval Duchy of Burgundy
- Walter Armstrong (1850–1918), British art historian and art critic
- Richard Bagwell (1840–1918), Irish historian who wrote on Tudor and Stuart-era Ireland, political commentator, and High Sheriff of Tipperary (1869)
- Joseph Bradney (1859–1933), historian (A History of Monmouthshire from the Coming of the Normans into Wales down to the Present Time)
- Arthur Bryant (1899–1985), historian and columnist
- George Thomas Orlando Bridgeman (1823–1895), antiquarian
- Robert Clutterbuck (1772–1831), English antiquary and topographer
- Michael Cobb (1916–2010), British railway historian (The Railways of Great Britain: A Historical Atlas)
- William Cole, 3rd Earl of Enniskillen (1807–1886), paleontologist and MP
- Richard A. Fletcher (1944–2005), English medieval historian
- Sir George Floyd Duckett, 3rd Baronet (1811–1902), English antiquarian who wrote on the Duckett family
- Sir Arthur Evans (1851–1941), archaeologist
- Michael Grant (1914–2004), English classicist and author on ancient history who translated the Annals of Imperial Rome
- Bendor Grosvenor (1977–), art historian
- William Richard Hamilton (1777–1859), English antiquarian and President of the Royal Geographical Society
- Robin Horton (1932–2019), anthropologist
- William Hunt (1842–1931), President of the Royal Historical Society (1905–1909)
- John Hurst (1927–2003), British archaeologist who excavated Wharram Percy
- R. W. Ketton-Cremer (1906–1969), English historian on Norfolkshire who bequeathed Felbrigg Hall to the National Trust, High Sheriff of Norfolk (1951–1952)
- Hubert Thomas Knox (1845–1921), Irish historian
- William Dickson Lang (1878–1966), Keeper of the Department of Geology at the British Museum (1928–1938)
- Charles Edward Long (1796–1861), English genealogist and antiquarian
- Alfred Maudslay (1850–1931), archaeologist
- Colin McEvedy (1930–2005), British polymath scholar and historian
- Herman Merivale (1806–1874), English historian and author
- Simon Sebag Montefiore (1965–), English historian, journalist, and popular history author
- Robert Orme (1728–1801), British historian of India
- Bernard Pares (1867–1949), English historian and diplomat who worked in Russian history and literature
- W. Sydney Robinson (1986–), British biographer
- Samuel Sandars (1837–1894), bibliographer who donated rare books to Cambridge University Library and High Sheriff of Buckinghamshire (1894)
- George Julius Poulett Scrope (1797–1876), English geologist
- Mark Sedgwick (1960–), British historian specializing in Sufism
- John Summerson (1904–1992), British architectural historian
- G. M. Trevelyan (1876–1962), British historian and Chancellor of Durham University (1950–1957)
- Cecil Torr (1857–1928), antiquarian and author
- D. H. Turner (1931–1985), English museum curator and art historian
- Royall Tyler (1884–1953), American historian who wrote the first English-language book to recognize El Greco
- Sir John Watney (1834–1923), Honorary Secretary of the City and Guilds of London Institute for the Advancement of Technical Education
- James Webb (1946–1980), Scottish historian who biographed George Gurdjieff
- Major-General John George Woodford (1785–1879), archaeologist involved in the Battle of Agincourt discovery

== Sports ==
- Charles W. Alcock (1842–1907), creator of the FA Cup
- John Forster Alcock (1841–1910), English footballer and a founder of The Football Association
- Lionel Gough Arbuthnot (1867–1942), English cricketer who played for R. A. Bennett's cricket team in the West Indies in 1901–02
- Henry Arundell (2002–), Rugby player England and London Irish
- Richard Attwood (1940–), former-Formula One driver
- John Barham, athlete
- Edward Beckett, 5th Baron Grimthorpe (1954–), racing manager to thoroughbred horse racer Khalid ibn Abdullah
- Morton Betts (1847–1914), 19th century sportsman
- David Blair (1917–1985), Scottish golfer who was in the top 10 in the 1960 Open Championship
- Adam Bogle (1848–1915), British footballer for Royal Engineers A.F.C. in the 1872 FA Cup Final
- David Bond (1922–2013), British Olympic sailor who won gold in the 1948 swallow event
- Sir George Bullough, 1st Baronet (1870–1939), British owner-breeder of thoroughbred racehorses
- Guy Butler (1899–1981), Olympic gold medalist
- Major Allan Cameron (1917–2011), British Army officer and founder of the International Curling Federation
- T.B.A. Clarke (1868–1909), English footballer
- Ian Collins (1903–1975), tennis player
- William Crake (1852–1921), English footballer
- Richard Crawshay (1882–1953), British Olympic fencer who competed in the 1912 men's team sabre
- Robert Dickinson, Olympic athlete
- Michael Doughty (1992–), footballer
- Lawrence Dundas, 3rd Marquess of Zetland (1908–1989), British lawn tennis player who played in Wimbledon
- Ernest Eldridge (1897–1937), British racing car driver
- James Espir (1958–), English middle-distance runner who won gold in the 1981 and 1985 Maccabiah Games
- James Ogilvie Fairlie (1809–1870), Scottish golfer who placed eighth in the 1861 Open Championship
- Tom French (1983–), rugby footballer of London Wasps
- Kenneth Gandar-Dower (1908–1944), English tennis player and aviator
- Richard Geaves (1854–1935), English footballer and the first Mexico-born player to represent England
- Spencer Gore (1850–1906), tennis player, first Wimbledon champion
- James Gowans (1872–1936), rugby player
- Douglas Robert Hadow (1846–1865), died on Matterhorn first ascent
- Frank Hadow (1855–1946), tennis player, Wimbledon champion
- William Haggas (1960–), British horse trainer
- Arnold Hills (1857–1927), amateur footballer. FA Cup finalist with Oxford University A.F.C. and capped for England national football team. Founder of Thames Ironworks F.C., which later became West Ham United F.C.
- Jack Hillyard (1891–1983), British tennis player
- Damian Hopley (1970–), England rugby team, and Chief Executive of Professional Rugby Players' Association
- Colonel John Hopton (1858–1934), Olympic marksman who represented Great Britain in the 1908 men's 1000 yard free rifle event
- A. N. Hornby (1847–1925), one of only two men to have captained England at cricket and rugby
- Gurth Hoyer-Millar (1929–2014), Scottish rugby union player and first-class cricketer
- Maro Itoje (1994–), England rugby squad and Saracens squad
- Beaumont Jarrett (1855–1905), English footballer
- Walter Jones (1866–1932), polo player
- Gilbert G. Kennedy (1844–1909), footballer
- Charles Leaf (1895–1947), Olympic gold medalist
- Nick Leventis (1980–), racing driver
- Douglas Lowe (1902–1981), Olympic gold medalist
- Julian Marshall (1836–1903), tennis player
- Sir Rupert Mackeson (1941–), 2nd Baronet, racing author
- William Massey (1817–1898), rower
- Alastair McCorquodale (1925–2009), Olympic silver medalist
- Hugh Mitchell (1849–1937), Scottish barrister who played for Royal Engineers A.F.C. in the 1872 FA Cup Final
- Charles Morice (1850–1932), played for England as a forward in the first international match against Scotland.
- Kaizer Motaung Junior (1981–), South African footballer
- Tony Nash (1936–), Olympic gold medalist in bobsleigh
- Arthur Page (1876–1958), Chief Justice of Burma who played Jeu de paume at the 1908 Summer Olympics and first-class cricket
- Walter Paton (1853–1937), English barrister who played for Oxford University in the 1873 FA Cup Final
- Sir Mark Prescott, 3rd Baronet (1948–), racehorse trainer
- Wilfred Bagwell Purefoy (1862–1930), British racehorse breeder
- Gareth Rees (1967–), Canadian fly-half rugby player
- Jack Richardson(1991–) Captained the England Polo Team and reached a handicap of 7 goals
- James Riddell (1909–2000), British skier who was injured at the 1936 Winter Olympics after crashing into a tree
- Sir Lancelot Royle KBE (1898–1978), Olympian & businessman, Governor of Harrow School
- Ronald Sanderson (1876–1918), rower
- Jamie Sparks (1992–), British ocean rower and adventurer
- George Spencer-Churchill, Marquess of Blandford (1992–), British aristocrat and polo player
- Scott Spurling (1993–), England U20 and Saracens squad
- Francis Stone (1886–1938), English rugby union player
- John Robert Sumner (1850–1933), footballer who played for Oxford University A.F.C. in the 1873 FA Cup Final and was later a rancher in Yampa, Colorado
- Alfred Thornton (1853–1906), English footballer in England's first international match against Scotland
- Dow Travers (1987–), Caymanian skier and rugby player
- Billy Vunipola (1992–), member of England rugby squad and Saracens squad
- Michael Warriner (1908–1986), English Olympic rower who won gold in the 1928 coxless four
- Fraser Waters (1976–), member of the London Wasps rugby union team and England centre
- Miles Watson, 2nd Baron Manton (1899–1968), racehorse breeder
- Reginald Courtenay Welch (1851–1939), England international footballer
- Charles Eugene Williams (1888–1935), English rackets world champion

=== Cricketers ===
- Edward Acheson (1844–1921), English first-class cricketer
- William Agar (1814–1906), English first-class cricketer
- Henry Alexander (1841–1920), English first-class cricketer
- Robert Anderson (1811–1891), English first-class cricketer
- Geoffrey Anson (1922–1977), English first-class cricketer
- Rupert Anson (1889–1966), English first-class cricketer
- Henry Arkwright (1837–1866), English first-class cricketer
- Vernon Armitage (1842–1911), English first-class cricketer
- Charles Austen-Leigh (1832–1924), English first-class cricketer
- Spencer Austen-Leigh (1834–1913), English first-class cricketer
- Hamer Bagnall (1904–1974), English first-class cricketer
- Edward Baily (1852–1941), English first-class cricketer
- Robert Baily (1885–1973), English first-class cricketer
- Gary Ballance (born 1989), Zimbabwean-English Test cricketer
- Charles Barclay (1837–1910), English first-class cricketer
- Micah Barlow (1873–1936), English first-class cricketer
- Anthony Benn (1912–2008), English first-class cricketer
- George Bennett (1883–1966), English first-class cricketer and Army officer
- Tris Bennett (1902–1978), English first-class cricketer
- Timothy Bevington (1881–1966), English/Canadian first-class cricketer
- Harry Biedermann (1887–1917), English first-class cricketer
- Morice Bird (1888–1933), English first-class cricketer
- William Blacker (1853–1907), Irish first-class cricketer
- Edward Bleackley (1898–1976), English first-class cricketer
- Henry Boldero (1831–1900), English first-class cricketer
- William Bolitho (1862–1919), English first-class cricketer
- Bertrand Bosworth-Smith (1873–1947), English first-class cricketer
- Druce Brandt (1887–1915), English first-class cricketer
- Charles Bridgeman (1852–1933), English first-class cricketer
- Francis Brooke (1810–1886), English first-class cricketer
- Robert Broughton (1816–1911), English first-class cricketer
- Henry Bruen (1856–1927), Irish first-class cricketer
- Charles Buller (1846–1906), English first-class cricketer
- Henry Burnell (1853–1910), English first-class cricketer
- Ernest Burnett (1844–1931), English first-class cricketer
- John Burnett (1840–1878), English first-class cricketer
- Edward Montagu Butler (1866–1948), English first-class cricketer
- John Butterworth (1905–1941), English first-class cricketer
- Reginald Butterworth (1906–1940), English first-class cricketer killed in World War II
- Cyril Buxton (1865–1892), English first-class cricketer and rackets player
- Kenneth Carlisle (1882–1967), English first-class cricketer
- Kenneth Carlisle (1908–1983), English first-class cricketer
- Malcolm Carlisle (1884–1906), English first-class cricketer
- Evelyn Carmichael (1871–1959), English first-class cricketer
- Bertram Carris (1917–2000), English first-class cricketer
- Laurence Champniss (1939–), English first-class cricketer
- Herbert Chaplin (1883–1970), English first-class cricketer
- Stephen Charles (1858–1950), English first-class cricketer
- Leathley Chater (1858–1931), English first-class cricketer
- George Cherry (1822–1877), English first-class cricketer and barrister
- Edmund Calverley (1826–1897), English first-class cricketer
- Freddie Clayton (1873–1946), English first-class cricketer
- William Clayton (1839–1876), English first-class cricketer
- Charles Clover-Brown (1907–1982), English first-class cricketer
- Henry Clutterbuck (1809–1883), English first-class cricketer
- Frank Cobden (1849–1932), English first-class cricketer
- Terence Cole (1877–1944), English first-class cricketer
- William Commerell (1822–1858), English first-class cricketer
- Nick Compton (1983–), England Test cricketer
- Kenneth Cooper (1883–1969), English first-class cricketer
- Charles Coote (1847–1893), Irish first-class cricketer
- Robert Copland-Crawford (1852–1894), Scottish footballer and first-class cricketer
- Fred Covington (1912–1995), English first-class cricketer
- Edmund Craigie (1842–1907), English first-class cricketer
- Eric Crake (1886–1948), English first-class cricketer
- Ralph Crake (1882–1952), English first-class cricketer
- Arthur Stafford Crawley (1876–1948), English first-class cricketer
- Cosmo Crawley (1904–1989), English first-class cricketer
- Eustace Crawley (1868–1914), English first-class cricketer
- Leonard Crawley (1903–1981), English first-class cricketer
- Spencer Crawley (born 1987), English first-class cricketer
- Gerry Crutchley (1890–1969), English first-class cricketer
- Percy Crutchley (1855–1940), English first-class cricketer
- George Dallas (1827–1888), English first-class cricketer
- Arthur Daniel (1841–1873), English first-class cricketer
- Charles Daniel-Tyssen (1856–1940), English first-class cricketer
- Maurice Dauglish (1867–1922), English first-class cricketer
- Augustus de Bourbel (1835–1917), English first-class cricketer
- Harry de Paravicini (1859–1942), English first-class cricketer
- Richard de Uphaugh (1895–1972), English first-class cricketer
- Edward Dewing (1823–1899), English first-class cricketer
- Reginald Digby (1847–1927), English first-class cricketer
- Edward Dowson (1880–1933), English first-class cricketer
- Alexander Drummond (1888–1937), English first-class cricketer
- Alfred du Cane (1835–1882), English first-class cricketer
- Huntley Duff (1822–1856), Scottish first-class cricketer
- Peter Dunbar (1984–), English first-class cricketer
- Paul Dunkels (1947–), English first-class cricketer
- John Dunn (1862–1892), English first-class cricketer who went down with the SS Bokhara
- Guy Dury (1895–1976), English first-class cricketer
- Theodore Dury (1854–1932), English first-class cricketer
- William Franks (1820–1879), English first-class cricketer
- Guy Earle (1891–1966), English first-class cricketer
- Charles Ormston Eaton (1827–1907), English first-class cricketer
- Tommy Enthoven (1903–1975), English first-class cricketer
- Charles Eyre (1883–1915), English first-class cricketer
- James Faithfull (1817–1873), English first-class cricketer
- Valentine Faithfull (1820–1894), English first-class cricketer
- Harry Falcon (1892–1950), English first-class cricketer
- Michael Falcon (1888–1976), English first-class cricketer and Unionist MP
- Bryan Farr (1924–2017), English first-class cricketer
- William Ffolkes (1820–1867), English first-class cricketer
- John Twisleton-Wykeham-Fiennes, 17th Baron Saye and Sele (1830–1907), English first-class cricketer
- Henry Finch (1842–1935), English first-class cricketer
- Robert Allan Fitzgerald (1834–1881), English first-class cricketer
- Neville Ford (1906–2000), English first-class cricketer
- Ralph Forster (1835–1879), English first-class cricketer
- Jack Foster (1905–1976), English first-class cricketer
- William Foster (born 1934), Scottish first-class cricketer
- Alastair Fraser (1967–), English first-class cricketer
- Joseph Frisby (1908–1977), English first-class cricketer
- Frederick Fryer (1849–1917), English first-class cricketer
- John Gibson (1833–1892), English first-class cricketer
- Cecil Goodden (1879–1969), English first-class cricketer
- Francis Gore (1855–1938), English first-class cricketer
- George Gowan (1818–1890), English first-class cricketer
- Ogilvie Graham (1891–1971), English first-class cricketer
- Cyril Gray (1895–1969), English first-class cricketer
- Theophilus Greatorex (1864–1933), English first-class cricketer
- Weir Greenlees (1882–1975), English first-class cricketer
- Basil Grieve (1864–1917), English first-class cricketer
- Francis Grimston (1822–1865), English first-class cricketer
- Robert Grimston (1816–1884), English first-class cricketer
- George Grundy (1859–1945), English first-class cricketer
- Mumtaz Habib (born 1987), Afghan first-class cricketer
- Edward Hadow (1863–1895), English first-class cricketer
- Walter Hadow (1849–1898), English first-class cricketer
- Edwin Handley (1806–1943), English first-class cricketer
- Frederick Hankey (1833–1892), English first-class cricketer
- Reginald Hankey (1832–1886), English first-class cricketer
- Charles Harenc (1811–1877), English first-class cricketer
- George Harper (1988–), English first-class cricketer
- Edward Harrison (1910–2002), English first-class cricketer and squash doubles champion
- Christopher Hawke (1934–), English first-class cricketer
- Arthur Haygarth (1825–1903), English first-class cricketer
- William Heale (1859–1907), English first-class cricketer
- Robert Henderson (1851–1895), English first-class cricketer
- Perceval Henery (1859–1938), English first-class cricketer
- David Henley-Welch (1923–2006), English first-class cricketer
- Herbie Hewett (1864–1921), English first-class cricketer
- Geoffrey Hill (1837–1891), English first-class cricketer
- Henry Hoare (1812–1859), English first-class cricketer
- George Langton Hodgkinson (1837–1915), English first-class cricketer
- George Hodgson (1839–1917), English first-class cricketer
- Ferdinand Hope-Grant (1839–1875), English first-class cricketer
- Geoffrey Hopley (1891–1915), English first-class cricketer
- John Hopley (1883–1951), South African first-class cricketer
- A. H. Hornby (1877–1952), English first-class cricketer
- Arthur Isaac (1873–1916), English first-class cricketer
- Herbert Isaac (1899–1962), English first-class cricketer
- John Isaac (1880–1915), English first-class cricketer
- Geoffrey Jackson (1894–1917), English first-class cricketer
- Guy Jackson (1896–1966), English first-class cricketer
- Tom Jameson (1892–1965), Irish first-class cricketer
- Lewis Jarvis (1857–1938), English first-class cricketer
- Neville Jessopp (1898–1977), English first-class cricketer
- Morgan Jones (1829–1905), Welsh first-class cricketer
- Michael Kaye (1916–1988), English first-class cricketer
- Christopher Keey (1969–), South African-born English first-class cricketer
- Arthur Kemp (1863–1940), English first-class cricketer
- Charles Kemp (1856–1933), English first-class cricketer
- Manley Kemp (1861–1951), English first-class cricketer
- Charles Kindersley (1893–1958), English first-class cricketer
- Henry Robert Kingscote (1802–1882), English first-class cricketer
- Philip Kington (1832–1892), English first-class cricketer
- William Kington (1838–1898), English first-class cricketer
- Philip Knight (1835–1882), English first-class cricketer
- Reginald Lambert (1882–1968), English first-class cricketer
- Arthur Lang (1890–1915), English first-class cricketer
- George Lang (1837–1898), English first-class cricketer
- Robert Lang (1840–1908), English first-class cricketer
- George Laverton (1888–1954), English first-class cricketer
- William Law (1851–1892), English first-class cricketer
- Anthony Lawrence (1911–1939), English first-class cricketer
- Herbert Leaf (1854–1936), English first-class cricketer
- James Leaf (1900–1972), English first-class cricketer who played for the Egypt national cricket team
- Edward Chandos Leigh (1832–1915), English first-class cricketer and Marylebone Cricket Club president
- John Leslie (1814–1897), Irish first-class cricketer
- William Lewis (1807–1889), English first-class cricketer
- Henry Linton (1838–1866), English first-class cricketer
- William Lithgow (1920–1997), English first-class cricketer
- Lord Henry Loftus (1822–1880), Irish first-class cricketer
- Francis Davy Longe (1831–1910), English first-class cricketer
- George Macan (1853–1943), Irish-born first-class cricketer
- Sir Archibald Macdonald, 3rd Baronet (1820–1901), English first-class cricketer
- Francis MacKinnon, 35th MacKinnon of MacKinnon (1848–1947), English Test cricketer
- William Mackeson (1856–1925), English first-class cricketer
- Archie MacLaren (1871–1944), English first-class cricketer
- Geoffrey MacLaren (1883–1966), English first-class cricketer
- James MacLaren (1870–1952), English first-class cricketer
- Sir Christopher Magnay, 3rd Baronet (1884–1960), English first-class cricketer
- Eric W. Mann (1882–1954), English first-class cricketer
- William Marillier (1832–1896), English first-class cricketer
- Robin Marlar (1931–), English first-class cricketer
- George Marten (1840–1905), English first-class cricketer
- Philip Martineau (1862–1944), English first-class cricketer
- Sir Anthony Mather-Jackson, 6th Baronet (1899–1983), English first-class cricketer
- Edmund Maynard (1861–1931), English first-class cricketer
- Edmund McCorquodale (1881–1904), English first-class cricketer
- Douglas McCraith (1878–1952), English first-class cricketer and cricket club chairman
- Joseph McMaster (1861–1929), English Test cricketer
- Walter Medlicott (1879–1970), English first-class cricketer
- Henry Meek (1857–1920), English first-class cricketer
- Edward Michell (1853–1900), English cricketer
- Barrington Mills (1821–1899), English first-class cricketer
- William Mills (1820–1877), English first-class cricketer
- Ian Mitchell (1925–2011), English first-class cricketer
- Robert Moncreiff, 3rd Baron Moncreiff (1843–1913), English first-class cricketer and clergyman
- Sir Thomas Moncreiffe, 7th Baronet (1822–1879), Scottish first-class cricketer
- Walter Money (1848–1924), English first-class cricketer
- Robert Monro (1838–1908), English first-class cricketer
- Spencer Montagu (1807–1882), English first-class cricketer
- Ralph Mortimer (1869–1955), English first-class cricketer
- Charles Napier (1817–1908), English first-class cricketer
- Rex Neame (1936–2008), English first-class cricketer
- Robert Nelson (1970–), English List A cricketer
- Henry Nethercote (1819–1886), English first-class cricketer and a High Sheriff of Northamptonshire
- John Nicholson (1822–1861), English first-class cricketer
- Sam Northeast (1989–), English first-class cricketer
- Alfred Northey (1838–1911), English first-class cricketer
- William Oates (1862–1942), English first-class cricketer
- William Openshaw (1852–1915), English rugby union player
- Charles Oxenden (1800–1874), English first-class cricketer
- Graham Oxenden (1802–1826), English first-class cricketer
- Rodney Palmer (1907–1987), English first-class cricketer
- Elliot Parke (1850–1923), English first-class cricketer
- John Parker, Scottish first-class cricketer
- William Paterson (1819–1892), English first-class cricketer
- William Patterson (1859–1946), English first-class cricketer
- John Pawle (1915–2010), English first-class cricketer
- Robert Payne (1811–?), English first-class cricketer
- Horace Peacock (1869–1940), English first-class cricketer
- Sidney Pelham (1849–1926), English first-class cricketer and Archdeacon of Norfolk
- Francis Pember (1862–1954), English first-class cricketer
- William Penn (1849–1921), English first-class cricketer
- Walter Phipps (1845–1902), English first-class cricketer
- Tony Pigott (1958–), English Test cricketer
- Frederick Pigou (1815–1847), English first-class cricketer
- Charles Plumer (1837–1914), English first-class cricketer
- Frederick Ponsonby, 6th Earl of Bessborough (1815–1895), English first-class cricketer and peer
- John Ponsonby-Fane (1848–1916), English first-class cricketer
- Charles Pope (1872–1959), English first-class cricketer
- Francis Popham (1809–1880), English first-class cricketer
- Marshall Porter (1874–1900), Irish barrister who played four first-class matches for Dublin University Cricket Club
- Guy Prendergast (1806–1887), English first-class cricketer
- George Prothero (1818–1894), English first-class cricketer
- Richard Pyman (1968–), Singaporean-born English first-class cricketer
- Francis Ramsay (1860–1947), English first-class cricketer, brother of the below
- Robert Ramsay (1861–1957), English first-class cricketer
- Jonathan Rashleigh (1820–1905), English landowner, first-class cricketer, brother of the above
- Anshuman Rath (1997–), Hong Kong cricketer
- Cyril Rattigan (1884–1916), English first-class cricketer
- Ernest Rivett-Carnac (1857–1940), English first-class cricketer
- William Robertson (1875–1950), English first-class cricketer
- John Robinson (1868–1898), English first-class cricketer
- Henry Rogers (1840–1915), English first-class cricketer
- David Rome (1910–1970), English first-class cricketer
- Charles Savile Roundell (1827–1906), Liberal MP for Grantham (1880–1885) and Skipton (1892–1895) and first-class cricketer
- Francis Rowe (1859–1897), English first-class cricketer
- Charles Rowley (1849–1933), English first-class cricketer
- Charles Rudd (1873–1950), English first-class cricketer
- Frederick Ruffell (1997–), English first-class cricketer
- Arthur Sanders (1900–1920), English first-class cricketer
- Ned Sanders (1852–1904), English first-class cricketer
- Sir John Scourfield, 1st Baronet (1808–1876), English first-class cricketer
- Charles Seymour (1855–1934), English first-class cricketer
- Francis Shand (1855–1921), English first-class cricketer
- John Sheppard (1824–1882), English first-class cricketer
- Charles Gerald Stewkley Shuckburgh (1911–1988), English first-class cricketer
- Edward Simpson (1867–1944), English first-class cricketer.
- Arthur Smith (1853–1936), English first-class cricketer
- Charles Smith (1849–1930), English first-class cricketer
- Ralph Spencer (1861–1926), English first-class cricketer
- Douglas Spiro (1863–1935), English first-class cricketer
- Edward Sprot (1872–1945), Scottish first-class cricketer
- Randolph Stewart, 11th Earl of Galloway (1836–1920), Scottish first-class cricketer and British Army soldier
- Philip Stewart-Brown (1904–1960), English first-class cricketer
- Edgar Stogdon (1870–1951), English first-class cricketer
- John Stogdon (1876–1944), English first-class cricketer
- Montague Stow (1847–1911), English first-class cricketer
- Arthur Straker (1893–1961), English first-class cricketer
- Alfred Tabor (1850–1925), English first-class cricketer
- Robert Taylor (1989–), English international cricketer for Scotland
- Thomas Taylor (1823–1859), cricketer
- Edward Thornewill (1836–1901), English first-class cricketer
- Henry Torre (1819–1904), English first-class cricketer
- Attwood Torrens (1874–1916), English first-class cricketer and officer
- William Torrens (1869–1931), English first-class cricketer
- George Tottenham (1890–1977), Irish first-class cricketer
- Walter Trevelyan (1821–1894), English first-class cricketer
- Henry Vernon (1828–1855), English first-class cricketer
- Godfrey Vigne (1801–1863), English first-class cricketer
- James Walford (1838–1915), English first-class cricketer
- Arthur Henry Walker (1833–1878), English first-class cricketer
- Charles Walker (1851–1915), English first-class cricketer
- Russell Walker (1842–1922), English first-class cricketer
- V. E. Walker (1837–1906), English first-class cricketer
- Conrad Wallroth (1851–1926), English first-class cricketer
- Townsend Warner (1841–1902), English first-class cricketer and clergyman
- Arthur Kenelm Watson (1867–1947), English first-class cricketer and school headmaster
- Frederic Watson (1840–1885), English first-class cricketer
- A. J. Webbe (1855–1941), English first-class cricketer
- George Webbe (1854–1925), English first-class cricketer
- Mark Weedon (1940–), English first-class cricketer
- William Welch (1911–1940), Australian first-class cricketer
- George Whatford (1878–1915), English first-class cricketer and British and Indian Army officer
- Robin Whetherly (1916–1943), English first-class cricketer killed in World War II
- Thomas Wilde, 3rd Baron Truro (1856–1899), English first-class cricketer
- Boris Wilenkin (1933–2003), English first-class cricketer
- Frederic Wilson (1881–1932), English first-class cricketer
- Geoffrey Wilson (1895–1960), English first-class cricketer
- Jack Wilson (1889–1959), English first-class cricketer
- Kenneth Woodward (1874–1950), English first-class cricketer
- Michael Wrigley (1924–1995), first-class cricketer, British Army officer and civil servant
- Major Hugh Wyld (1880–1961), English first-class cricketer and British Army officer
- George Wyndham (1801–1870), English first-class cricketer
- Wilfrid Young (1867–1947), English first-class cricketer

== Bankers and economists ==
- Joseph Gurney Barclay (1879–1976), banker and missionary
- Francis Bevan (1840–1919), chairman of Barclays Bank (1896–1916) and High Sheriff of Middlesex (1899)
- Richard Bevan (1788–1870), British banker and co-founder of Barclays Bank
- Richard Alexander Bevan (1834–1918), British banker known as "the father of Cuckfield"
- Robert Cooper Lee Bevan (1809–1890), British banker who served as a senior partner of Barclays Bank and played a role in the Brighton and Hove City Mission
- Thomas Bedford Bolitho (1835–1915), President of the Institute of Bankers (1893–1895) and Liberal Unionist MP for St Ives (1887–1900)
- Thomas Robins Bolitho (1840–1925), English banker, landowner, and High Sheriff of Cornwall (1890)
- Indrajit Coomaraswamy (1950–), Governor of the Central Bank of Sri Lanka
- Walter Cunliffe, 1st Baron Cunliffe (1855–1920), Governor of the Bank of England
- John Dalrymple, 10th Earl of Stair (1819–1903), Governor of the Bank of Scotland
- John Duffield (1939–), British financier
- John Saunders Gilliat (1829–1912), Governor of the Bank of England
- Edward Grenfell, 1st Baron St Just (1870–1941), British banker
- Henry Grenfell (1824–1902), Governor of the Bank of England
- John Benjamin Heath (1790–1879), Governor of the Bank of England (1845–1847)
- Frederick Huth Jackson (1863–1921), founding partner of Frederick Huth & Co and High Sheriff of the County of London (1918–1919)
- Arthur Cecil Pigou (1877–1959), economist
- Michael Richardson (1925–2003), managing director of N M Rothschild & Sons and an informal advisor to Thatcher-era HM Treasury
- Henry Ryder, 4th Earl of Harrowby (1836–1900), banking partner at Coutts
- Chatumongol Sonakul (1943–), Governor of the Bank of Thailand
- Sir Dermot de Trafford, 6th Baronet (1925–2010), British banker

== Business ==
- Noël Annesley (1941–), British auctioneer and honorary chairman of Christie's
- Apcar Alexander Apcar (1850–1913), Armenian merchant and racehorse owner
- Gregory Apcar (1795–1847), Armenian merchant and philanthropist
- Simon Astaire (1961–), British public relations advisor
- Sir John Beckwith (1947–), British businessman and chartered accountant
- William Bentinck, Viscount Woodstock (1984–), English social entrepreneur and speaker
- Sir Alfred Allen Booth, 1st Baronet (1872–1948), British businessman and shipowner
- Edward Bonham Carter (1960–), British fund manager at Jupiter Fund Management and brother of Helena Bonham Carter
- Gerald Bridgeman, 6th Earl of Bradford (1911–1981), president of the Country Landowners' Association
- Richard Bridgeman, 7th Earl of Bradford (1947–), British businessman and campaigner against the sale of false titles of nobility
- John Allen Clark (1926–2001), managing director of Plessey
- Sir Arthur Cory-Wright (1869–1951), chairman of William Cory & Son (coal) and High Sheriff of Hertfordshire (1921)
- John Ewen Davidson (1841–1923), Australian sugar planter
- Lindsay Everard (1891–1940), Everards Brewery chairman and Conservative MP
- Sir John Ritchie Findlay, 1st Baronet (1866–1930), Scottish owner of The Scotsman
- Elliott Torrance Galt (1850–1928), Canadian businessman
- Samuel Greg (1758–1834), British entrepreneur who founded Quarry Bank Mill and pioneered the factory system
- Gerald Grosvenor, 6th Duke of Westminster (1951–2016), British landowner and businessman, chairman of Grosvenor Group
- Ivor Guest, 1st Baron Wimborne (1835–1914), Welsh industrialist
- Nubar Gulbenkian (1896–1972), Armenian oil magnate
- Lord Claud Hamilton MP (1843–1925), Great Eastern Railway chairman
- Sir Samuel Hercules Hayes, 4th Baronet (1840–1901), Ashendene Press founder, High Sheriff of Donegal (1884–1887)
- Christopher Helm (1937–2007), Scottish book publisher
- Neil Heywood (1970–2011), British businessman found dead in his hotel room in Chongqing under suspicious circumstances
- Arnold Hills (1857–1927), English businessman and managing director of Thames Ironworks and Shipbuilding Company. Philanthropist who established Thames Ironworks F.C., which later became West Ham United F.C.
- J. Bruce Ismay (1862–1937), English businessman and chairman of the White Star Line when its flagship RMS Titanic sank
- Ali Koç (1967–), Turkish businessman, Koç Holding member and 37th president of Fenerbahçe S.K.
- Constantine Leventis, Greek Cypriot businessman and philanthropist
- Samuel Cunliffe Lister, 2nd Baron Masham (1857–1917), prominent Yorkshire industrialist
- Jho Low (1981–), Malaysian fugitive businessman involved in 1Malaysia Development Berhad corruption scandal
- Leonard Lyle, 1st Baron Lyle of Westbourne MP (1882–1954), British industrialist and chairman of Tate and Lyle
- David Lyon (1794–1872), West Indies merchant and MP
- Sir Herbert Mackworth-Praed, 1st Baronet (1841–1921), politician and banker
- Paul Manduca (1951–), chairman of Prudential plc
- Julian Metcalfe (1959–), founder of Pret a Manger
- Russi Mody (1918–2014), Chairman of Tata Steel
- Shanti Kumar Morarjee (1902–1982), Indian industrialist and associate of Mahatma Gandhi
- Isaac Morier (1750–1817), consul-general of the Levant Company
- Crispin Odey (1959–), hedge fund manager
- Richard Ogden (1919–2005), British jeweller
- Jonathan Oppenheimer (1969–), South African businessman
- Nicky Oppenheimer (1945–), South African Chairman of De Beers
- Philip Oppenheimer (1911–1995), British diamond dealer
- Tony O'Reilly, Junior (1966–), Irish-Australian businessman
- Gavin O'Reilly (1966–), Irish-Australian businessman
- Peter Owen Edmunds (1959–2016), co-founder of telecoms firm Peterstar
- Angad Paul (1970–2015), British businessman
- Frederick James Quick (1836–1902), coffee merchant
- Edward Rayne (1922–1992), head of H. & M. Rayne
- Francis Northey Richardson (1894–1983), President of the Institute of Brewing
- Anthony Gustav de Rothschild (1887–1961)
- Edmund Leopold de Rothschild (1916–2009)
- Sir Evelyn de Rothschild (1931–)
- William Geoffrey Rootes (1917–1992), British businessman who was chairman of Rootes Motors (1964–1967), Chrysler UK (1967–1978), and the National Economic Development Council (1968–1973)
- Timothy Royle (1931–), founding chairman of Control Risks Group
- James Cholmeley Russell (1841–1912), barrister, financier, property developer, railway entrepreneur
- Sir Victor Sassoon (1881–1961), businessman, hotelier from the banking family
- Anthony Saxton (1934–2015), British advertiser
- George Murray Smith the Younger (1859–1919), chairman of the Midland Railway (1911–1919)
- Christopher Rice Mansel Talbot (1803–1890), industrialist
- Henry Yates Thompson (1838–1928), Newspaper proprietor
- George Townshend, 7th Marquess Townshend (1916–2010), Chairman of Anglia Television
- James Murray Wells (1983–), owner-founder of Glasses Direct
- Nicholas Wrigley (1955–), British banker at N M Rothschild & Sons and chairman of Persimmon plc
- William Robert Young (c. 1856–1933), Irish linen merchant and Irish privy councillor

== Law ==
- Rt. Hon. Sir William Aldous (1936–2018), Lord Justice of Appeal
- Edward Tindal Atkinson (1878–1957), Director of Public Prosecutions (1930–1944)
- Sir Dunbar Barton (1853–1937), High Court judge
- Thomas Henry Baylis (1817–1908), English legal writer
- Gilbert Beyfus (1885–1960), English barrister
- Richard Bingham (1915–1992), Judge of Appeal of the Isle of Man (1965–1972) and Conservative MP for Liverpool Garston (1957–1966)
- Reginald More Bray (1842–1923), English High Court judge (1904–1923)
- William Napier Bruce (1858–1936), British educationalist and lawyer
- Charles Buller (1806–1848), Judge Advocate General of the Armed Forces (1846–1847)
- Willoughby Harcourt Carter (1822–1900), Chief Constable of Buckinghamshire (1857–1867)
- Sir Felix Cassel (1869–1953), 1st Baronet, Judge Advocate General
- Sir Arthur Channell (1838–1928), oarsman and High Court judge
- Sir John Thomas Claridge (1792–1868), Recorder for the Straits Settlements (1825–1829)
- Sir H. S. Cunningham (1832–1920), Advocate General of the Madras Presidency and High Court judge in Bengal
- Sir Edward East, 1st Baronet (1764–1847), Chief Justice of Bengal
- William David Evans (1767–1821), English lawyer and Vice-Chancellor of the County Palatine of Lancaster
- Sir Charles Dalrymple Fergusson, 5th Baronet (1800–1849), Scottish lawyer
- John Goldney (1846–1920), Chief Justice of Trinidad and Tobago
- Walter de Havilland (1872–1968), patent attorney
- George Sowley Holroyd (1758–1831), English lawyer and justice of the King's Bench
- Sir Gerald Howard (1896–1973), High Court judge
- Sir Henry Jackson, 2nd Baronet (1831–1881), MP and High Court judge
- Miles Jackson-Lipkin (1924–2012), disgraced Hong Kong High Court judge
- Francis Jeune, 1st Baron St Helier (1843–1905), President of the Probate, Divorce and Admiralty Division
- Sir Adrian Knox (1863–1932), Second Chief Justice of the High Court of Australia
- George Somes Layard (1857–1925), English barrister and author
- Timothy Lawson-Cruttenden (1955–2019), British barrister and chairman of the Solicitors' Association of Higher Court Advocates who drowned to his death while bodysurfing off the coast of Gibraltar
- William O'Brien Lindsay (1909–1975), Chief Justice of Anglo-Egyptian Sudan
- Jonathan Marks, Baron Marks of Henley-on-Thames (1952–), British barrister and Liberal Democrat life peer
- Peter Millett, Baron Millett (1932–), Lord of Appeal
- Henry Moncreiff, 2nd Baron Moncreiff (1840–1909), Senator of the College of Justice, Scotland
- Andrew Murray, 1st Viscount Dunedin (1849–1942), Lord of Appeal
- Sir Basil Nield (1903–1996), MP and High Court judge
- John Bruce Norton (1815–1883), Advocate-General of Madras Presidency (1863–1868)
- Sir Peter Openshaw (1947–), High Court judge
- Sir Arthur Page (1876–1958), Chief Justice of Burma, cricketer, and Olympic jeu de paume player
- E. H. Pember (1833–1911), English barrister
- Sir Thomas Joshua Platt (1788–1862), Baron of the Exchequer
- Sir Henry Plowden (1840–1920), High Court judge in the Punjab and cricketer
- Henry Adolphus Rattigan (1864–1920), Chief Justice of the Chief Court of the Punjab
- Sir John Richardson (1771–1841), Judge of the Court of Common Pleas
- Guy Ridley (1885–1947), Master in Lunacy
- Giles Rooke (1743–1808), English judge at the Court of Common Pleas
- Ronald Roxburgh (1889–1981), British high court judge and writer on the history of the Inns of Court
- Philip Ruttley (1954–), Anglo-Swiss leader
- Sir Lancelot Sanderson (1863–1944), MP and Chief Justice at Bengal
- Frederick Solly-Flood (1801–1888), Attorney General of Gibraltar (1866–1877)
- Donald Somervell, Baron Somervell of Harrow (1889–1960), Attorney General, Home Secretary, Lord of Appeal
- Guy Stephenson (1865–1930), assistant director of Public Prosecutions
- Arthur Hay Stewart Reid (1851–1930), Chief Justice of the Chief Court of the Punjab
- Thomas Tomlin, Baron Tomlin (1867–1935), Lord of Appeal
- Felix Vaughan (1766–1799), barrister
- Robert Wallace (1860–1929), British barrister in Northern Ireland har 512
- Sir Jean-Pierre Warner (1824–1905), High Court judge
- Edward West (1782–1828), British judge known for his statement of the law of diminishing returns
- Sir Philip Wilbraham Baker Wilbraham, 6th Baronet (1875–1957), British ecclesiastical lawyer and administrator
- Sir Joshua Williams (1837–1915), Judge of the Supreme Court New Zealand

== Adventurers, explorers, and mountaineers ==
- Tom Avery (1975–), explorer
- James Bruce (1730–1794), Scottish explorer and traveller
- Henry Cookson (1975–), British polar explorer and adventurer among the first to reach the southern pole of Inaccessibility by foot
- Keppel Craven (1779–1851), British traveller in the Society of Dilettanti
- Charles Boileau Elliott (1803–1875), English travel writer
- Stewart Gore-Browne (1883–1967), pioneer white settler in Northern Rhodesia
- Pen Hadow (1962–), explorer
- John Hornby (1880–1927), English explorer in the Northwest Territories
- David Mayer de Rothschild (1978–), British adventurer and owner of the Plastiki
- Henry Stuart Russell (1818–1889), explorer
- Charles Sturt (1795–1869), British explorer of Australia

== Collectors and numismatists ==
- Taylor Combe (1774–1826), English numismatist
- John Norton, 5th Baron Grantley (1855–1943), British numismatist
- Thomas Peel (1793–1865), early settler of Western Australia and a second cousin of Robert Peel
- Standish Vereker, 7th Viscount Gort (1888–1975), art collector

== Others ==
- John Amery (1912–1945), pro-Nazi fascist, hanged for treason, whose brainchild was the British Free Corps
- Edward Aveling (1849–1898), English Marxist
- Sir William Bass, 2nd Baronet (1879–1952), racehorse owner and supporter of the film industry
- George Blake (1922–), British spy who worked as a double agent for the Soviet Union and escaped HM Prison Wormwood Scrubs in 1966
- Bo Guagua (1987–), second son of Chinese politician Bo Xilai
- William Bosville (1745–1813), English landowner and celebrated bon vivant
- William Hardin Burnley (1780–1850), largest slave-owner in 19th-century Trinidad
- Sir J. R. M. Butler (1889–1975), politician and academic
- Jack Churchill (1880–1947), brother of Winston Churchill
- William Clarke (1883–1961), British cryptographer of naval codes in both World Wars
- Henry Conway (1983–), English socialite and son of Derek Conway MP
- Alexander Kirkman Finlay (c. 1845–1883), groom of the second vice-regal wedding in New South Wales
- John Robert Godley (1814–1861), founder of Canterbury, New Zealand
- David Plunket Greene (1904–1941), one of the bright young things
- Charles James (1906–1978)
- Jho Low (1981–), Malaysian-Chinese businessman involved in 1Malaysia Development Berhad scandal
- John Whitaker Maitland (1831–1909), English landowner and owner of Loughton Hall
- John Moore-Brabazon, 1st Baron Brabazon of Tara (1884–1964), aviation pioneer
- Charles Anthony Pearson (1956–), owner of the Dunecht estate
- Charles Rudd (1844–1916), friend of Cecil Rhodes
- Sir Percy Shelley, 3rd Baronet (1819–1889), son of Mary Shelley
- James Templer (1846–1924), balloonist
- The Hon Sir Mark Thatcher (1953–), son of former British Prime Minister Baroness Margaret Thatcher
- Phil Vincent (1908–1979), British motorcycle designer and manufacturer, founder of Vincent Motorcycles

== Old Harrovians in fiction ==
- Sir Nigel Thornberry from The Wild Thornberrys
- Major-General Candy from The Life and Death of Colonel Blimp
- Colonel Pickering in Pygmalion
- Lord Brett Sinclair from The Persuaders!
- Paul Marshall, antagonist from novel Atonement and the film of the same name
- Withnail and Uncle Monty from Withnail and I
- Matthew Pocket from novel Great Expectations by Charles Dickens
- Winston Yu from novel Snakehead
- Septimus Hodge from Arcadia by Tom Stoppard
- Sir Percy Blakeney from The Scarlet Pimpernel novels by Emma Orczy
- Sherlock Holmes in the 2009 film is an Old Harrovian.
- In the BBC TV series Sherlock, Eddie Van Coon from "The Blind Banker" is an old Harrovian.
- Banyard in the BBC sitcom Porridge and its film spinoff is a former dentist gaoled for interfering with a female patient while under anesthetic, who states at 12:10 minutes into the film in a discussion about the poor quality of the meals served "...I am well used to this kind of food, I went to Harrow".
