= List of Marylebone Cricket Club players (1864–1894) =

Cricketers who debuted for Marylebone Cricket Club (MCC) in first-class cricket from the legalisation of overarm bowling in 1864 until the end of the 1894 season are as follows. Many of the players represented MCC after 1894 but they are only listed here, as it was in this period that they made their MCC debuts. 1894 was the last full season before the official definition of first-class cricket was implemented in May 1895.

MCC played all its home matches through the period at its own Lord's venue in north London. Although some players who represented the club were members or ground staff, most were associated with county clubs and appeared for MCC by invitation. MCC teams have always operated at all levels of the sport and players who represented the club in minor cricket only are out of scope here. At this time, MCC had not taken control of overseas tours by the England cricket team and had yet to play any matches outside Great Britain (the first was a visit to Ireland in 1895).

The details are the player's usual name followed by the span of years in which he was active as an MCC player in important matches (the span may include years in which he played in minor matches only for MCC and/or years in which he did not represent MCC in any matches) and then his name is given as it would appear on modern match scorecards (e.g., surname preceded by all initials), followed by the county club or other team with which he was mostly associated (this may be MCC itself). A handful of these players later travelled abroad on winter tours organised by MCC from 1903/04: dates and destinations are given at the end of each relevant entry. Players who took part in early Test cricket, which began in 1877, have their names highlighted in bold text.

== A ==
- Robert Abdy (1888) : R. B. Abdy (MCC)
- Archibald Acheson (1864) : Lord A. B. S. Acheson (MCC)
- Edward Acheson (1866) : E. A. B. Acheson (MCC)
- Bayly Akroyd (1879) : B. N. Akroyd (Surrey)
- Charles Allcock (1883) : C. H. Allcock (Cambridge University)
- Frederic Allsopp (1884) : F. E. Allsopp (MCC)
- Josceline Amherst (1866) : J. G. H. Amherst (MCC)
- Percy Amherst (1871) : P. A. Amherst (MCC)
- Alexander Anstruther (1873–1887) : A. W. Anstruther (Sussex)
- Arthur Appleby (1874) : A. Appleby (Lancashire)
- J. Archdale (1876) : J. Archdale (MCC)
- Henry Arkwright (1864–1866) : H. Arkwright (Cambridge University)
- Henry Armitstead (1864) : S. H. Armitstead (MCC)
- William Armitstead (1864) : W. G. Armitstead (MCC)
- Harry Arnall-Thompson (1887) : H. T. Arnall-Thompson (Oxford University)
- **William Attewell** (1883–1900) : W. Attewell (Nottinghamshire)

== B ==
- Herbert Bainbridge (1883–1887) : H. W. Bainbridge (Surrey)
- John Bainbridge (1882) : J. H. Bainbridge ()
- Matthew Baines (1884–1890) : M. T. Baines ()
- Francis Baker (1868–1875) : F. Baker (Gloucestershire)
- Robert Drummond Balfour (1865–1873) : R. D. Balfour ()
- Leslie Balfour-Melville (1892) : L. M. Balfour-Melville ()
- Alan Barnes (1877–1879) : A. S. Barnes (Derbyshire)
- **Billy Barnes** (1879–1894) : W. Barnes (Nottinghamshire)
- Ted Barratt (1872) : E. D. Barratt ()
- Robert Bartholomew (1872) : R. Bartholomew
- Hamar Alfred Bass (1865) : H. A. Bass ()
- William Bather (1883) : W. H. Bather (CUCC)
- **George Bean** (1890–1898) : G. Bean (Sussex) ()
- Arthur Becher (1872) : A. W. R. Becher (MCC)
- Russell Bencraft (1881–1885) : H. W. R. Bencraft (Hampshire)
- Ferdinando Bennet (1878) : F. W. Bennet (Kent)
- William Betts (1866) : W. H. Betts
- George Bird (1874–1878) : G. Bird (Middlesex)
- Walter Bird (1880) : W. Bird ()
- William Blacker (1876) : W. Blacker (CUCC)
- Joseph Blundell (1882) : J. W. Blundell
- **Jack Board** (1892–1909) : J. H. Board (Gloucestershire). Tours: South Africa (1905/06).
- Francis Bohlen (1894–1904) : F. H. Bohlen (Philadelphia, London County)
- Clement Booth (1871–1886) : C. Booth (Hampshire)
- Lionel Booth (1885) : L. E. B. Booth (MCC)
- Farrington Boult (1873) : F. H. Boult (Surrey)
- Walter Bovill (1874) : W. D. Bovill (MCC)
- Courtenay Boyle (1866–1872) : C. E. Boyle (Oxford University)
- William Brain (1891) : W. H. Brain (Oxford University)
- Thomas Bramwell (1875) : T. Y. Bramwell (MCC)
- Edward Bray (1877–1879) : E. Bray (Surrey)
- William Bridgeman, 1st Viscount Bridgeman (1888–1894) : W. C. Bridgeman (Cambridge University)
- Thomas Brindley (1867) : T. Brindley (MCC)
- John Brockbank (1874) : J. B. Brockbank ()
- Thomas Brown (1894–1901) : T. A. Brown ()
- Charles Brune (1868–1875) : C. J. Brune (Middlesex)
- Edward Buckland (1885) : E. H. Buckland ()
- Francis Buckland (1891) : F. M. Buckland (Middlesex, OUCC)
- Henry Bull (1864–1876) : H. E. Bull (OUCC)
- Charles Buller (1865–1877) : C. F. Buller (Middlesex)
- Charles Bulpett (1877–1882) : C. W. L. Bulpett (Middlesex)
- Charles Burke (1882) : C. C. Burke (MCC)
- Henry Burnell (1879) : H. B. Burnell (MCC)
- James Burns (1890–1901) : J. Burns ()
- George Burton (1883–1892) : G. Burton ()
- Edward Butler (1877) : E. H. Butler ()
- Cyril Buxton (1889–1891) : C. D. Buxton ()
- John Byass (1876) : J. E. Byass (Kent)

== C ==
- Frederick Campbell (1868–1869) : F. Campbell
- Frederick Capron (1881–1882) : F. W. Capron
- John Carlin (1888–1901) : J. Carlin ()
- Herbert Carpenter (1893–1906) : H. A. Carpenter (Essex)
- John Carrick (1882) : J. Carrick
- Arthur Carter (1885) : A. Carter
- Thomas Case (1868–1869) : T. Case (Middlesex)
- Leathley Chater (1881) : L. Chater
- **William Chatterton** (1886–1899) : W. Chatterton ()
- **Stanley Christopherson** (1885) : S. Christopherson (Kent)
- Smith Churchill (1865) : S. W. Churchill
- William Churchill (1870–1872) : W. Churchill
- Charles Clarke (1877–1885) : C. F. C. Clarke (Surrey)
- Robert Clayton (1872–1881) : R. O. Clayton (Yorkshire)
- Lord Clifton (1873–1880) : Lord Clifton (Kent)
- Frank Cobden (1870–1872) : F. C. Cobden (Cambridge University)
- Bransby Cooper (1867–1869) : B. B. Cooper (Kent)
- John Cooper (1881) : J. F. Cooper
- Charles Coote (1869–1874) : C. P. Coote
- Robert Copland-Crawford (1872–1873) : R. E. W. Copland-Crawford ()
- George Cotterill (1890) : G. H. Cotterill ()
- Clement Cottrell (1877–1883) : C. E. Cottrell (Middlesex)
- Henry Coventry (1888) : H. T. Coventry
- Edmund Craigie (1870) : E. W. Craigie ()
- **James Cranston** (1891) : J. Cranston ()
- Frank Fairbairn Crawford (1880–1884) : F. F. Crawford ()
- Henry Crawley (1887) : H. E. Crawley ()
- William Crawley (1867) : W. P. Crawley
- John Cressy-Hall (1873–1880) : J. W. Cressy-Hall (MCC)
- Frederick Crooke (1874–1875) : F. J. Crooke (Gloucestershire)
- Frederick Crowder (1874) : F. Crowder (Gentlemen of England)
- James Crowdy (1872) : J. G. Crowdy ()
- Percy Crutchley (1877) : P. E. Crutchley ()
- Frederick Currie (1894) : F. A. Currie
- Edward Curteis (1887) : E. W. Curteis ()
- Herbert Curteis (1874–1880) : H. Curteis ()
- Robert Curteis (1880–1881) : R. M. Curteis

== D ==
- Lewis D'Aeth (1894) : L. N. H. D'Aeth
- Richard Daft (1883) : R. Daft (Nottinghamshire)
- John Dale (1869–1882) : J. W. Dale (Middlesex)
- Earl of Dalkeith (1881–1885) : Earl of Dalkeith (MCC)
- George Davenport (1885–1896) : G. Davenport (Cheshire)
- John Davey (1874–1876) : J. G. Davey ()
- George Davidson (1888–1898) : G. A. Davidson ()
- John Davidson (1864) : J. E. Davidson ()
- Leslie Davidson (1877) : W. L. Davidson ()
- G. A. Dawson (1871) : G. A. Dawson (Gentlemen of the South)
- Harry de Paravicini (1882–1885) : H. F. de Paravicini (MCC)
- Percy de Paravicini (1883–1889) : P. J. de Paravicini ()
- Charles de Trafford (1889–1911/12) : C. E. de Trafford (Leicestershire). Tours: New Zealand (1906/07); South America (1911/12).
- Francis Disney-Roebuck (1878–1882) : F. H. A. Disney-Roebuck (MCC)
- George Dodsworth (1868) : G. E. Dodsworth
- Adam Duncan (1873–1879) : A. S. D. Duncan (Cambridge University)
- John Dunn (1882) : J. Dunn ()
- Theodore Dury (1877) : T. S. Dury ()
- Edwin Dyke (1866) : E. F. Dyke (Cambridge University)

== E ==
- Hubert Eaton (1887–1894) : H. F. J. Eaton ()
- William Eccles (1866–1867) : W. H. Eccles ()
- **Tom Emmett** (1885–1886) : T. Emmett (Yorkshire)
- Alfred Evans (1882–1885) : A. H. Evans ()
- William Evetts (1870–1882) : W. Evetts ()
- Christopher Ewbank (1866) : C. C. Ewbank ()
- John Eyre (1887) : J. Eyre ()

== F ==
- Frank Farrands (1868–1880) : F. H. Farrands (Nottinghamshire)
- James Fellowes (1870) : J. Fellowes ()
- **J. J. Ferris** (1891–1894) : J. J. Ferris ()
- Charles Filgate (1869–1873) : C. R. Filgate (Gloucestershire)
- Heneage Finch, 6th Earl of Aylesford (1866) : H. R. Finch ()
- Alfred Fitzgerald (1868) : A. W. Fitzgerald
- Francis Fitzgerald (1890) : F. J. Fitzgerald
- Maurice Purcell-FitzGerald (1866) : M. N. R. P. Fitzgerald ()
- Michael Flanagan (1876–1877) : M. Flanagan (Middlesex)
- **Wilfred Flowers** (1878–1895) : W. Flowers (Nottinghamshire)
- Cyril Foley (1888–1906) : C. P. Foley ()
- Charles Foley (1891) : C. W. Foley (Cambridge University)
- Paul Foley (1891) : P. H. Foley (Worcestershire)
- George Foljambe (1879–1882) : G. S. Foljambe (Nottinghamshire)
- Godfrey Foljambe (1892–1893) : G. A. T. Foljambe (MCC)
- Edward Follett (1868) : E. C. Follett
- William Foord-Kelcey (1878) : W. Foord-Kelcey (Kent)
- Augustus Ford (1880–1881) : A. F. J. Ford (Middlesex)
- **Francis Ford** (1893–1899) : F. G. J. Ford ()
- William Justice Ford (1881–1896) : W. J. Ford ()
- Henry Forster, 1st Baron Forster (1887–1888) : H. W. Forster ()
- **Arnold Fothergill** (1882–1886) : A. J. Fothergill ()
- Thomas Fowler (1864–1867) : T. F. Fowler (Cambridge University)
- Gerald Fowler (1890–1891) : G. Fowler ()
- Howard Fowler (1884) : H. Fowler ()
- William Herbert Fowler (1880–1885) : W. H. Fowler ()
- Charles Francis (1874–1879) : C. K. Francis (Middlesex)
- John Frederick (1866–1869) : J. S. Frederick (Hampshire)
- Lovick Friend (1891) : L. B. Friend ()
- C. B. Fry (1893) : C. B. Fry ()
- Douglas Fyfe (1866–1869) : D. M. Fyfe

== G ==
- William Game (1883) : W. H. Game (Surrey)
- Herbert Gardner (1882) : H. W. Gardner
- **Leslie Gay** (1894–1904) : L. H. Gay ()
- Frederic Geeson (1892–1902) : F. Geeson ()
- Joseph Gibbs (1894–1896) : J. A. Gibbs ()
- Arthur Gibson (1892–1896) : A. B. E. Gibson ()
- Hugh Gillett (1868) : H. H. Gillett ()
- James Gowans (1891) : J. Gowans ()
- **E. M. Grace** (1865–1868) : E. M. Grace (Gloucestershire)
- **W. G. Grace** (1869–1904) : W. G. Grace (Gloucestershire)
- W. G. Grace junior (1894–1895) : W. G. Grace junior ()
- Joseph Greatorex (1882–1884) : J. E. A. Greatorex (MCC)
- Theophilus Greatorex (1885–1887) : T. Greatorex ()
- Charles Green (1869–1880) : C. E. Green ()
- Joseph Green (1870) : J. F. Green ()
- William Green (1880–1884) : W. B. Green
- Frederick Greenfield (1874–1883) : F. F. J. Greenfield (Sussex)
- Charles Greenwood (1875) : C. W. Greenwood
- Algernon Griffiths (1871–1873) : A. S. Griffiths (Middlesex)
- Herbert Griffiths (1876–1878) : H. T. Griffiths
- **William Gunn** (1881–1900) : W. Gunn (Nottinghamshire)

== H ==
- Edward Hadow (1883–1890) : E. M. Hadow ()
- Frank Hadow (1874) : P. F. Hadow (Middlesex)
- Walter Hadow (1871–1884) : W. H. Hadow (Middlesex)
- Richard Halliwell (1866–1873) : R. B. Halliwell (Middlesex)
- Leonard Hamilton (1893) : L. A. H. Hamilton (Kent)
- Lord George Hamilton (1864) : Lord G. F. Hamilton ()
- William Hamilton (1883) : W. D. Hamilton ()
- T. P. Hanbury (1882) : T. P. Hanbury ()
- Reginald Hargreaves (1876–1878) : R. G. Hargreaves (Hampshire)
- **Lord Harris** (1875–1895) : Lord Harris (Kent)
- John Hartley (1878) : J. D. Hartley
- Alfred Hastings (1869) : A. G. Hastings ()
- **Lord Hawke** (1884–1911/12) : Lord Hawke. Tours: South America (1911/12).
- Edward Hawtrey (1880–1882) : E. M. Hawtrey
- George Hay (1882) : G. Hay (Derbyshire)
- William Hay (1877) : W. H. Hay ()
- Francis Head (1881) : F. S. Head ()
- William Hearn (1878–1891) : W. Hearn (South)
- **Alec Hearne** (1888–1910) : A. Hearne ()
- **Frank Hearne** (1882–1889) : F. Hearne ()
- G. F. Hearne (1882) : G. F. Hearne ()
- **G. G. Hearne** (1877–1903) : G. G. Hearne (Kent)
- **J. T. Hearne** (1891–1921) : J. T. Hearne ()
- Sir James Heath, 1st Baronet (1882–1910/11) : J. Heath. Tours: West Indies (1910/11).
- Arthur Heath (1876–1894) : A. H. Heath (Middlesex)
- Coote Hedley (1890–1893) : W. C. Hedley ()
- Augustus Hemming (1874–1878) : A. W. L. Hemming ()
- Perceval Henery (1885–1893) : P. J. T. Henery (Middlesex)
- Allen Herbert (1872–1876) : A. H. W. Herbert (Middlesex)
- **Christopher Heseltine** (1892–1914) : C. Heseltine ()
- Herbie Hewett (1888–1896) : H. T. Hewett ()
- John Hibbert (1881–1882) : J. C. Hibbert
- William Higgins (1870–1873) : W. C. Higgins ()
- Ledger Hill (1893–1911/12) : A. J. L. Hill. Tours: South America (1911/12).
- Frederick Hill (1871) : F. H. Hill (OUCC)
- Henry Hill (1880–1883) : H. J. Hill
- Robert Hills (1867–1876) : R. S. Hills ()
- George Hillyard (1891–1895) : G. W. Hillyard ()
- Philip Hilton (1874) : P. Hilton ()
- Trevitt Hine-Haycock (1886) : T. R. Hine-Haycock (Kent)
- Charles Hoare (1878) : C. T. Hoare ()
- Henry Hoare (1867) : H. W. Hoare ()
- Alfred Holt (1883) : A. Holt (Gentlemen of England)
- **Leland Hone** (1878–1880) : L. Hone ()
- William Hone (1864–1877) : W. Hone ()
- William Hood (1875–1880) : W. N. Hood
- Fraser Hore (1866) : F. S. Hore ()
- **A. N. Hornby** (1873–1898) : A. N. Hornby (Lancashire)
- John Horner (1867) : J. F. F. Horner ()
- John Hornsby (1892–1898) : J. H. J. Hornsby (Middlesex)
- Frederick Hotham (1883) : F. W. Hotham ()
- Charles Hough (1883) : C. H. Hough
- Leonard Howell (1875) : L. S. Howell ()
- George Howitt (1872) : G. Howitt (Middlesex)
- John Hulme (1889) : J. J. Hulme ()
- Charles Hulse (1885) : C. W. Hulse
- Edward Hume (1867) : E. Hume (OUCC)
- James Husey-Hunt (1878) : J. H. Husey-Hunt ()
- William Hutchinson (1869) : W. F. M. Hutchinson
- Henry Hyndman (1865) : H. M. Hyndman (Sussex)

== I ==
- Alfred Inglis (1885) : A. M. Inglis ()
- Arthur Ireland (1881) : A. Ireland
- Francis Isherwood (1872) : F. W. R. Isherwood (Oxford University)

== J ==
- **Stanley Jackson** (1894–1905) : F. S. Jackson (Yorkshire)
- James Jardine (1870–1874) : J. Jardine
- Lewis Jarvis (1879) : L. K. Jarvis (Cambridge University)
- Arthur Frederick Jeffreys (1872–1879) : A. F. Jeffreys (Hampshire)
- Edward Jobson (1891) : E. P. Jobson ()
- Richard Jones (1884–1885) : R. S. Jones (Kent)

== K ==
- Sir Kenneth Hagar Kemp, 12th Baronet (1872–1873) : K. H. Kemp (Cambridge University)
- Charles Kemp (1878) : C. W. M. Kemp (Kent)
- Arthur Kemp (1885) : A. F. Kemp ()
- George Kemp, 1st Baron Rochdale (1894–1898) : G. Kemp ()
- Manley Kemp (1885–1888) : M. C. Kemp ()
- Matthews Kempson (1865) : S. M. E. Kempson ()
- William Kenyon-Slaney (1869–1880) : W. S. Kenyon-Slaney ()
- Kingsmill Key (1888–1908) : K. J. Key ()
- Richard Key (1866) : R. L. T. Key ()
- Henry Kingscote (1868–1878) : H. B. Kingscote (Gloucestershire)
- Sidney Kitcat (1890–1891) : S. A. P. Kitcat ()
- Charles Kortright (1893) : C. J. Kortright ()

== L ==
- Francis Lacey (1887–1896) : F. E. Lacey ()
- Oswald Lancashire (1882–1886) : O. P. Lancashire (Lancashire)
- Alfred Langhorne (1880) : A. R. M. Langhorne
- Henry Langley (1866) : H. F. J. Langley ()
- Thomas Latham (1874) : T. Latham (Cambridge University)
- George Law (1879–1881) : G. Law (Middlesex)
- William Law (1873–1882) : W. Law ()
- Reginald le Bas (1882) : R. V. le Bas
- Philip Le Gros (1921–1922) : P. W. le Gros (Minor Counties)
- Henry Leaf (1884) : H. M. Leaf ()
- Gerald Leatham (1876–1882) : G. A. B. Leatham (Yorkshire)
- Albert Leatham (1886–1897) : A. E. Leatham ()
- Vernon Leese (1892–1897) : V. F. Leese (Cambridge University)
- William Leese (1889–1890) : W. H. Leese
- **Charles Leslie** (1882) : C. F. H. Leslie (Middlesex)
- William Legge, 6th Earl of Dartmouth (1877) : Viscount Lewisham ()
- Herbert Littlewood (1887–1896) : H. D. Littlewood ()
- Willie Llewelyn (1893) : W. D. Llewelyn (Oxford University)
- Edward Lloyd (1868) : E. W. M. Lloyd (Cambridge University)
- Henry Long (1880) : H. J. Long ()
- George Longman (1877–1881) : G. H. Longman (Hampshire)
- Arthur Luard (1893) : A. J. H. Luard ()
- Alfred Lubbock (1866–1869) : A. Lubbock (Kent)
- **A. P. Lucas** (1880–1906) : A. P. Lucas (Surrey)
- Morton Lucas (1881–1887) : M. P. Lucas (Sussex)
- Alfred Lucas (1880) : A. G. Lucas
- Robert Slade Lucas (1894–1895) : R. S. Lucas ()
- **Alfred Lyttelton** (1877–1881) : A. Lyttelton (Middlesex)
- Edward Lyttelton (1878–1879) : E. Lyttelton (Middlesex)
- Arthur Lyttelton (1872) : A. T. Lyttelton ()
- Robert Lyttelton (1873–1874) : R. H. Lyttelton

== M ==
- **Gregor MacGregor** (1888–1907) : G. MacGregor. Tours: North America (1907).
- William Mackeson (1883) : W. J. Mackeson
- Montague MacLean (1893) : M. F. MacLean ()
- Reginald Maitland (1885) : R. P. Maitland ()
- William Fuller-Maitland (1866–1870) : W. F. Maitland ()
- William Maitland (1868–1869) : W. J. Maitland ()
- James Mansfield (1883–1888) : J. W. Mansfield (Cambridge University)
- Frank Marchant (1890–1896) : F. Marchant (Kent)
- Charles Marriott (1870) : C. Marriott (Oxford University)
- Thomas Roger Marshall (1884–1886) : T. R. Marshall ()
- William Marten (1869) : W. G. Marten (Kent)
- George Marten (1864–1869) : G. N. Marten (Gentlemen of England)
- **Frederick Martin** (1886–1900) : F. Martin ()
- John Stapleton Martin (1871)
- John Newton Martin (1891) : J. N. Martin
- Sidney Martin (1871) : J. S. Martin ()
- Marcus Martin (1865) : M. T. Martin ()
- Lionel Martineau (1888) : L. Martineau (Cambridge University)
- Philip Martineau (1883) : P. H. Martineau ()
- Frederick Maude (1883–1897) : F. W. Maude (Middlesex)
- John Maude (1873) : J. Maude (Oxford University)
- Wellwood Maxwell (1890) : W. Maxwell
- Edmund Maynard (1883–1887) : E. A. J. Maynard ()
- Ronald McNeill, 1st Baron Cushendun (1885) : R. J. McNeill ()
- **Walter Mead** (1892–1911) : W. Mead (Essex)
- George Meares (1876) : G. B. Meares
- Jack Mee (1894) : R. J. Mee (Nottinghamshire)
- Henry Meek (1878) : H. E. Meek
- Frank Mellor (1878) : F. H. Mellor (Kent)
- Leonard Micklem (1869) : L. Micklem
- George "Bay" Middleton (1870–1880) : W. G. Middleton ()
- **Billy Midwinter** (1880–1882) : W. E. Midwinter (Gloucestershire)
- Audley Miles (1876) : A. C. Miles ()
- Roger Miller (1881–1884) : R. Miller (Cambridge University)
- Francis Miller (1877) : F. S. Miller
- William Miller (1876) : W. H. Miller
- Henry Mills (1881) : H. M. Mills (Middlesex)
- George Milman (1868–1869) : G. A. Milman
- George Mirehouse (1887–1896) : G. T. Mirehouse ()
- Mike Mitchell (1878–1883) : R. A. H. Mitchell ()
- Walter Money (1868–1869) : W. B. Money (Surrey)
- Victor Montagu (1868–1869) : V. A. Montagu
- Henry Montgomery (1868) : H. H. Montgomery ()
- Francis Montresor (1880) : W. F. Montresor
- William Moore (1870) : W. F. P. Moore (Gentlemen of England)
- Robert Moorhouse (1891–1900) : R. Moorhouse (Yorkshire)
- Osbert Mordaunt (1866) : O. Mordaunt
- **Fred Morley** (1874–1883) : F. Morley (Nottinghamshire)
- Norman Morris (1873) : N. Morris (Surrey)
- Huson Morris (1868) : H. Morris
- Reginald Moss (1893) : R. H. Moss (Liverpool & District)
- Kenneth Muir Mackenzie, 1st Baron Muir Mackenzie (1870) : K. A. Muir-Mackenzie ()
- George Mumford (1867) : G. Mumford (Middlesex)
- **Billy Murdoch** (1891–1902) : W. L. Murdoch ()
- Thomas Mycroft (1878–1887) : T. Mycroft (Derbyshire)
- William Mycroft (1876–1886) : W. Mycroft (Derbyshire)

== N ==
- Duncan Napier (1892) : D. R. Napier
- Frank Needham (1891–1901) : F. Needham (Nottinghamshire)
- Augustus Nepean (1876–1877) : A. A. S. Nepean (Middlesex)
- Evan Nepean (1886–1902) : E. A. Nepean ()
- Stephen Newton (1885–1890) : S. C. Newton (Middlesex)
- Henry Nixon (1873) : H. Nixon
- Frederick Norley (1865) : F. Norley (Kent)

== O ==
- **T. C. O'Brien** (1883–1905) : T. C. O'Brien (Middlesex)
- Edward O'Shaughnessy (1880–1883) : E. O'Shaughnessy (Kent)
- Cuthbert Ottaway (1876) : C. J. Ottaway (Middlesex)
- Hugh Owen (1885) : H. G. P. Owen (Essex)

== P ==
- Herbert Page (1886) : H. V. Page ()
- Henry Palairet (1868–1869) : H. H. Palairet
- Elliot Parke (1879–1884) : E. A. Parke (South)
- John Parnham (1883–1889) : J. T. Parnham (United Eleven)
- Bernard Pauncefote (1871) : B. Pauncefote (Middlesex)
- Clement Pavey (1882) : C. S. Pavey
- Alfred Payne (1883–1884) : A. E. Payne (N/A)
- Thomas Pearce (1874–1876) : T. A. Pearce (South)
- Thomas Pearson (1873–1890) : T. S. Pearson (Middlesex)
- Francis Pelham, 5th Earl of Chichester (1868) : F. G. Pelham (Sussex)
- Francis Pember (1882–1885) : F. W. Pember (Hampshire)
- **Frank Penn** (1876–1881) : F. Penn (Kent)
- William Penn (1874) : W. Penn ()
- John Pennycuick (1883) : J. Pennycuick ()
- John Pentecost (1887) : J. H. Pentecost (Kent)
- **Hylton Philipson** (1889–1897) : H. Philipson ()
- Jim Phillips (1888–1893) : J. Phillips (Middlesex, Victoria)
- Herbert Phipps (1865) : H. G. Phipps ()
- Harry Pickett (1884–1898) : H. Pickett ()
- Charles Pigg (1887–1901) : C. Pigg ()
- Herbert Pigg (1893) : H. Pigg ()
- **Dick Pilling** (1879–1883) : R. Pilling (Lancashire)
- John Platts (1870) : J. T. B. D. Platts ()
- John Ponsonby-Fane (1869) : J. H. Ponsonby-Fane
- Dudley Pontifex (1883–1896) : D. D. Pontifex ()
- Charles Pope (1894) : C. G. Pope (Cambridge University)
- Roland Pope (1889–1891) : R. J. Pope ()
- **Dick Pougher** (1887–1902) : A. D. Pougher ()
- Ernest Powell (1888–1895) : E. O. Powell ()
- Walter Powys (1877–1879) : W. N. Powys (Hampshire)
- Walter Price (1868–1882) : W. Price (Nottinghamshire)

== Q ==
- Francis Quinton (1893–1895) : F. W. D. Quinton (Hampshire)

== R ==
- Francis Ramsay (1894) : M. F. Ramsay (Queensland)
- Frederick Randon (1874–1876) : F. Randon (Players of the North, North)
- **Ranjitsinhji** (1894–1912) : Ranjitsinhji ()
- Harry Ravenhill (1882) : E. H. G. Ravenhill
- John Rawlin (1887–1909) : J. T. Rawlin ()
- **Walter Read** (1890) : W. W. Read ()
- Farrant Reed (1882) : H. F. Reed ()
- Henry Renny-Tailyour (1875) : H. W. Renny-Tailyour (Kent)
- Alfred Renshaw (1871) : A. G. Renshaw
- Herbert Rhodes (1878–1883) : H. E. Rhodes (Yorkshire)
- William Richards (1866) : W. H. Richards
- Henry Richardson (1869–1870) : H. A. Richardson (Middlesex)
- Henry Richardson (1890–1894) : H. Richardson (Nottinghamshire)
- John Maunsell Richardson (1874) : J. M. Richardson ()
- Richard Richardson (1876–1877) : R. T. Richardson ()
- George Ricketts (1892–1902) : G. W. Ricketts ()
- Edward Riddell (1870–1871) : E. M. H. Riddell ()
- Arthur Ridley (1875–1882) : A. W. Ridley (Hampshire)
- James Robertson (1880–1892) : J. Robertson (Middlesex)
- John Robinson (1889–1896) : J. S. Robinson (Nottinghamshire)
- John Robinson (1893) : J. J. Robinson ()
- Charles Robson (1883) : C. Robson ()
- William Rodwell (1882) : W. H. Rodwell
- William Rose (1867) : W. M. Rose
- Hamilton Ross (1879–1889) : H. Ross ()
- Hugh Rotherham (1884) : H. Rotherham ()
- James Round (1865–1869) : J. Round ()
- William Rowell (1891) : W. I. Rowell (Cambridge University)
- Charles Rowley (1870–1879) : C. R. Rowley (Middlesex)
- **Vernon Royle** (1878) : V. P. F. A. Royle (Lancashire)
- Harold Ruggles-Brise (1884) : H. G. Ruggles-Brise ()
- John Russel (1875–1891) : J. S. Russel (South)
- Patrick Russel (1894) : P. Russel
- Edward Rutter (1869–1874) : E. Rutter (Middlesex)
- Arnold Rylott (1872–1888) : A. Rylott ()

== S ==
- Ted Sainsbury (1883–1884) : E. Sainsbury (Somerset)
- Edward Salmon (1879) : E. H. P. Salmon (Middlesex)
- Lancelot Sanderson (1888) : L. Sanderson (Lancashire)
- John Sandford (1869) : J. D. Sandford (Oxford University)
- James Henry Savory (1879–1883) : J. H. Savory (Oxford University)
- **Sandford Schultz** (1881–1884) : S. S. Schultz (Lancashire)
- Lord George Scott (1886–1905) : G. W. Scott (MCC)
- Stanley Scott (1889) : S. W. Scott (Middlesex)
- **William Scotton** (1881–1891) : W. H. Scotton (Nottinghamshire)
- Charles Seymour (1879) : C. R. Seymour (Hampshire)
- Frank Shacklock (1889–1893) : F. J. Shacklock (Nottinghamshire)
- Francis Shadwell (1880–1881) : F. B. Shadwell (Surrey)
- **Alfred Shaw** (1865–1881) : A. Shaw (Nottinghamshire)
- **Mordecai Sherwin** (1878–1895) : M. Sherwin (Nottinghamshire)
- Charles Showers (1881) : C. J. Showers (MCC)
- **John Shuter** (1881–1893) : J. Shuter (Surrey)
- Leonard Shuter (1878) : L. A. Shuter (Surrey)
- Arthur Smith (1875) : A. F. Smith (Middlesex)
- **C. Aubrey Smith** (1886) : C. A. Smith (Sussex)
- Charles Smith (1867–1878) : C. J. Smith (Middlesex)
- Ernest Smith (1892–1902) : E. Smith (Yorkshire)
- John Smith (1871–1872) : J. Smith (Cambridgeshire)
- A. H. Smith-Barry (1873–1875) : A. H. Smith-Barry (MCC)
- Harry Smith-Turberville (1886) : H. T. Smith-Turberville (MCC)
- John Smythe (1878–1885) : J. W. Smythe (MCC)
- Francis Speed (1882–1884) : F. E. Speed
- James Spens (1886–1888) : J. Spens (Hampshire)
- Douglas Spiro (1883–1890) : D. G. Spiro (Cambridge University)
- **Fred Spofforth** (1890–1897) : F. R. Spofforth (Derbyshire)
- Thomas Spyers (1890) : T. R. Spyers (MCC)
- Harry Stedman (1871) : H. C. P. Stedman (Cambridge University)
- **A. G. Steel** (1880–1890) : A. G. Steel (Lancashire)
- Douglas Steel (1881) : D. Q. Steel (Lancashire)
- Frederick Steele (1879–1880) : F. Steele (Middlesex)
- Herbert Stewart (1869) : H. Stewart (Hampshire)
- **Andrew Stoddart** (1887–1900) : A. E. Stoddart (Middlesex)
- Charles Stone (1894–1896) : C. C. Stone (Leicestershire)
- **Bill Storer** (1893–1904) : W. Storer (Derbyshire)
- William Story (1883) : W. F. Story (Nottinghamshire)
- Montague Stow (1867) : M. H. Stow (Cambridge University)
- George Strachan (1872–1878) : G. Strachan (Gloucestershire)
- Alfred Stratford (1878–1880) : A. H. Stratford (Middlesex)
- Edward Streatfeild (1890) : E. C. Streatfeild (Surrey)
- Arthur Studd (1887–1888) : A. H. Studd (MCC)
- **Charles Studd** (1881–1884) : C. T. Studd (Middlesex)
- Edward Studd (1879–1886) : E. J. C. Studd (MCC)
- **George Studd** (1879–1885) : G. B. Studd (Middlesex)
- Herbert Studd (1890–1895) : H. W. Studd (Middlesex)
- Kynaston Studd (1880–1885) : J. E. K. Studd (Middlesex)
- Reginald Studd (1894) : R. A. Studd (Hampshire)
- Edmund Sutton (1864–1873) : E. G. G. Sutton (Middlesex)
- William Swain (1864) : W. Swain (MCC)
- Charles Sykes (1890) : C. P. Sykes

== T ==
- Thomas Tapling (1886) : T. K. Tapling ()
- Hector Tennent (1865–1872) : H. N. Tennent (Lancashire)
- Charles Thornton (1869–1895) : C. I. Thornton (Kent)
- Richard Thornton (1881–1893) : R. T. Thornton (Kent)
- Albert Thornton (1879) : A. J. Thornton ()
- Walter Thornton (1883) : W. A. Thornton (Oxford University)
- Charles Thring (1889) : C. H. M. Thring
- Valentine Titchmarsh (1885–1891) : V. A. Titchmarsh ()
- Frederic Tobin (1870) : F. Tobin (Cambridge University)
- Robert Tomkinson (1873) : R. E. Tomkinson
- Charles Toppin (1891) : C. Toppin ()
- William Townshend (1874) : W. Townshend (Oxford University)
- Walter Toynbee (1879) : W. T. Toynbee
- George Traill (1864) : G. B. Traill
- Arthur Trevor (1882–1885) : A. H. Trevor (Sussex)
- Frederick Trevor (1864) : F. G. B. Trevor
- Edward Tritton (1866–1875) : E. W. Tritton (Middlesex)
- Richard Tryon (1871) : R. Tryon
- Henry Tubb (1873–1877) : H. Tubb
- George Tuck (1866–1876) : G. H. Tuck (Cambridge University)
- John Turner (1887) : J. A. Turner (Cambridge University)
- John Turner (1876–1883) : J. Turner
- **Edward Tylecote** (1874–1886) : E. F. S. Tylecote (Kent)
- Henry Tylecote (1879–1886) : H. G. Tylecote (South)

== U ==
- John Udal (1871–1875) : J. S. Udal (MCC)
- **George Ulyett** (1880–1885) : G. Ulyett (Yorkshire)

== V ==
- George Vanderspar (1893) : G. A. H. Vanderspar (MCC)
- Harry Verelst (1868) : H. W. Verelst (Yorkshire)
- **George Vernon** (1876–1898) : G. F. Vernon (Middlesex)
- Stirling Voules (1865) : S. C. Voules (Oxford University)

== W ==
- James Walker (1883–1892) : J. G. Walker (Middlesex)
- Nesbit Wallace (1885) : N. W. Wallace (Hampshire)
- Edward Wallington (1885) : E. W. Wallington (Oxford University)
- Conrad Wallroth (1871) : C. A. Wallroth (Kent)
- William Walrond (1868) : W. H. Walrond (MCC)
- J. L. Wanklyn (1885) : J. L. Wanklyn (MCC)
- Edward Ward (1871) : E. E. Ward (Cambridge University)
- William Ward (1871) : W. E. Ward (MCC)
- **Pelham Warner** (1894–1929) : P. F. Warner (Middlesex)
- Frederic Watson (1869–1874) : F. Watson (MCC)
- Charles Weatherby (1882) : C. T. Weatherby (MCC)
- **A. J. Webbe** (1875–1897) : A. J. Webbe (Middlesex)
- George Webbe (1878) : G. A. Webbe (MCC)
- Herbert Webbe (1877) : H. R. Webbe (Middlesex)
- Gerry Weigall (1894–1926/27) : G. J. V. Weigall (Kent)
- James Welldon (1868) : J. T. Welldon (Kent)
- Tristram Welman (1874–1889) : F. T. Welman (MCC)
- John West (1869–1883) : J. West (Yorkshire)
- William West (1888–1891) : W. A. J. West (MCC)
- Edward Western (1882) : E. Western (Somerset)
- John Wheeler (1877–1887) : J. Wheeler (Leicestershire)
- Lees Whitehead (1890–1903) : L. Whitehead (Yorkshire)
- John Whiteside (1890–1902) : J. P. Whiteside (Leicestershire)
- Herbert Whitfeld (1881–1887) : H. Whitfeld (Sussex)
- Montague Wilde (1881–1883) : T. M. M. Wilde (MCC)
- Anthony Wilkinson (1867–1871) : A. J. A. Wilkinson (Middlesex)
- William Wilkinson (1890) : W. O. C. Wilkinson (MCC)
- Edmund Willes (1866–1867) : E. H. L. Willes (MCC)
- Frederic Willett (1882) : F. S. D. Willett (MCC)
- Billy Wilson (1892–1895) : G. L. Wilson (Sussex)
- Cecil Wilson (1884–1885) : C. Wilson (Kent)
- Leslie Wilson (1893) : L. Wilson (Kent)
- Sidney Wilson (1882) : S. J. Wilson (MCC)
- Thomas Wilson (1869) : T. H. Wilson (Hampshire)
- L. Forbes Winslow (1864) : L. S. F. Winslow (MCC)
- Lyndhurst Winslow (1875) : L. Winslow (Sussex)
- Arthur Winter (1867–1870) : A. H. Winter (MCC)
- Arthur Wood (1880–1881) : A. H. Wood (Hampshire)
- George Wood (1880–1881) : G. H. Wood
- **Sammy Woods** (1889–1902) : S. M. J. Woods (Somerset)
- William Woof (1882–1885) : W. A. Woof (Gloucestershire)
- Jimmy Wootton (1884–1891) : J. Wootton (Kent)
- Arthington Worsley (1888–1890) : A. Worsley (MCC)
- **Charles Wright** (1883–1901) : C. W. Wright (Nottinghamshire)
- J. Wright (1882) : J. Wright (MCC)
- Walter Wright (1886) : W. Wright (Nottinghamshire)
- William Wright (1866) : W. H. Wright (MCC)
- George Wyatt (1875–1886) : G. N. Wyatt (MCC)
- Frederick Wyld (1875–1885) : F. Wyld (Nottinghamshire)
- Edward Wynne-Finch (1864–1866) : E. H. Wynne-Finch (MCC)
- **Teddy Wynyard** (1887–1912) : E. G. Wynyard (Hampshire)

== Y ==
- William Yardley (1870–1873) : W. Yardley (Kent)
- Richard Young (1873) : R. J. C. Young (MCC)

== See also ==
- Lists of Marylebone Cricket Club players
