= 1868 English cricket season =

Cricket season review

The 1868 English cricket season was the fifth since the legalisation of overarm bowling. It featured the first organised group of Australian sportspeople to travel overseas, being an all-Aboriginal cricket team. (Note: Some eleven-a-side matches played from 1772 to 1863 have been rated "first-class" by certain sources. However, the term only came into common use around 1864, when overarm bowling was legalised. It was formally defined as a standard by a meeting at Lord's, in May 1894, of Marylebone Cricket Club (MCC) and the county clubs which were then competing in the County Championship. The ruling was effective from the beginning of the 1895 season, but pre-1895 matches of the same standard have no official definition of status because the ruling is not retrospective. Matches of a similar standard since the beginning of the 1864 season are generally considered to have an unofficial first-class status. Pre-1864 matches which are included in the ACS' "Important Match Guide" may generally be regarded as top-class or, at least, historically significant. For further information, see First-class cricket.)

== Playing record (by county) ==
County	Played	Won	Lost	Tied	Drawn
Cambridgeshire	2	1	1	0	0
Kent	8	5	3	0	0
Lancashire	5	1	4	0	0
Middlesex	8	4	3	1	0
Nottinghamshire	6	4	2	0	0
Surrey	12	5	6	1	0
Sussex	6	2	4	0	0
Yorkshire	7	4	3	0	0
(Note: Hampshire, though regarded until 1885 as first-class, played no inter-county matches between 1868 and 1869 or 1871 and 1874.)

Owing to an exceptionally hot and dry summer, and the absence of the forthcoming revolution of the heavy roller, 1868 was to be the last season in which every county match was finished outright.

== Leading batsmen (qualification 10 innings) ==
1868 English season leading batsmen
Name	Team	Matches	Innings	Not outs	Runs	Highest score	Average	100s	50s
W. G. Grace	Gentlemen; South of England	7	11	2	588	134 not out	65.33	3	2
Isaac Walker	Marylebone Cricket Club (MCC); Middlesex	13	24	5	661	165	34.78	1	3
James Lillywhite	Sussex	13	24	6	631	126 not out	30.04	1	4
Henry Richardson	Cambridge University; Kent; Middlesex	10	16	1	431	143	28.73	1	3
George Savile	Cambridge University; Yorkshire	7	11	0	294	105	26.72	1	2

== Leading bowlers (qualification 800 balls) ==
1868 English season leading bowlers
Name	Team	Balls bowled	Runs conceded	Wickets taken	Average	Best bowling	5 wickets in innings	10 wickets in match
Thomas Hearne	Marylebone Cricket Club (MCC); Middlesex	957	279	33	8.45	5/20	1	0
Tom Emmett	Yorkshire	1628	528	60	8.80	9/34	5	1
George Freeman	Yorkshire	1560	454	46	9.86	8/11	6	2
Edgar Willsher	Kent	3999	1128	113	9.98	7/44	12	6
George Howitt	Middlesex; Nottinghamshire	2262	734	71	10.33	6/17	6	2

== Events ==
- A team of Aboriginal Australians was the first overseas team to tour England, under the auspices of Sydney publican/cricketer Charles Lawrence. They were not a first class team.
- 25–26 May: Edward Tylecote hits the first recorded score of 300 in any grade of cricket with 404 for Classicals against Moderns at Clifton College
- 20 June: C.A. Absolom became the first player to be given out obstructing the field when playing for Cambridge University v. Surrey at The Oval.
- 3–5 August: Playing for South of the Thames v North of the Thames at Canterbury, W.G. Grace became the second player to score two centuries in a match after William Lambert in 1817.
- The Cattle Market Ground in Islington, the original home of Middlesex County Cricket Club, was sold by its owner for development following the season. The last game, on 5 and 6 October, was between "Gentlemen of Middlesex" and a 22 called "The Clowns". Middlesex were not to have another home until the equally short-lived Prince's Cricket Ground opened.

== Bibliography ==
- ACS (1981). A Guide to Important Cricket Matches Played in the British Isles 1709–1863. Nottingham: ACS. OCLC 85045528.
- ACS (1982). A Guide to First-class Cricket Matches Played in the British Isles. Nottingham: ACS. OCLC 10586869.
- Warner, Pelham (1946). Lords: 1787–1945. London: Harrap. OCLC 877106024.

== Annual reviews ==
- John Lillywhite's Cricketer's Companion (Green Lilly), Lillywhite, 1869
- Wisden Cricketers' Almanack, 1869
