= Wembley Park Cricket Club =

Wembley Park Cricket Club made just one appearance in first-class cricket, when they lost to the touring Australians during their 1896 tour of England by 135 runs. It was based at Wembley Park Cricket Ground, Wembley Park, today covered by the Wembley Stadium complex.

== Squad ==
The following players were in the XI that played the Australians:

- Charles de Trafford (Captain)
- Evan Nepean
- Charlie McGahey
- Peter Perrin
- John Rawlin
- Lees Whitehead
- Frederick Maude
- Frederick Spofforth
- Jim Phillips
- Thomas Russell (Wicketkeeper)
- Harry Pickett

== Scorecard ==
Australians
106
&
131
Australians won by 135 runs

Syd Gregory 26
Frederick Spofforth 6/49

Syd Gregory 43
Frederick Spofforth 5/51

Wembley Park Cricket Ground, Wembley, England
Umpires: Dick Barlow and William West

Wembley Park
65
&
37

Harry Pickett 20
George Giffen 6/20

Evan Nepean 12
Harry Trott 4/18
