= Herbert Curteis =

Herbert Curteis may refer to:

- Herbert Mascall Curteis (1823–1895), English cricketer and member of parliament
- Herbert Curteis (cricketer, born 1849) (1849–1919), English cricketer
- Herbert Barrett Curteis (1793–1847), English Whig politician
