= Arthur Richards (cricketer) =

English cricketer and British Army officer

Personal information
- Full name: Arthur Carew Richards
- Born: 20 February 1865; Grays, Essex, England
- Died: 29 November 1930 (aged 65); Nottingham, Nottinghamshire, England
- Batting: Right-handed
- Bowling: Right-arm slow
- Relatives: William Richards (father)

Domestic team information
- Years: Team
- 1884–1904: Hampshire

Career statistics
Competition	First-class
Matches	4
Runs scored	104
Batting average	17.33
100s/50s	0/0
Top score	47
Balls bowled	304
Wickets	3
Bowling average	37.33
5 wickets in innings	0
10 wickets in match	0
Best bowling	3/45
Catches/stumpings	2/–
- Source: Cricinfo, 13 February 2010

Arthur Carew Richards OBE (20 February 1865 – 29 November 1930) was an English first-class cricketer and an officer in the British Army.

== Life and military career ==
The son of the cricketer and clergyman William Richards, he was born in February 1865 at Grays, Essex. He was educated at Eton College, where he played for the college cricket eleven and won the Public School Racket with Ralph Pemberton. From there, he matriculated to Jesus College, Cambridge. During the summer break which followed his freshman year at Cambridge, Richards made his first-class debut for Hampshire against Sussex at Southampton in 1884, with him making a further appearance that season against Somerset.

After graduating from Cambridge, he was commissioned a lieutenant in the Hampshire Regiment in December 1886. Richards served with the Burmese Expedition from 1887 to 1889, during which he was slightly injured. He was made a supernumerary captain in July 1893, before seeing action in the Second Boer War. After arrival in South Africa in early 1900, he took part in the battles of Paardeberg, Poplar Grove, Karee, Brandfort and de Vet and Zand Rivers; and the occupation of the Boer capitals Bloemfontein and Pretoria. He was District Commander at Hoopstad from June 1900 until April 1901, was mentioned in despatches and received the Queen's South Africa Medal (with three clasps). Following the end of hostilities in early June 1902, he left Cape Town on board the SS Orotava, and arrived at Southampton the next month. From November 1902 he was an adjutant in the 5th (Isle of Wight Princess Beatrice's) Volunteer Battalion of the Hampshire Regiment, before being promoted to the full rank of captain in 1905. He retired from active service in July of the same year.

Since playing for Hampshire in 1884, the county had lost and later regained its first-class status. Richards returned to play for Hampshire in the 1903 County Championship against Essex, before making a final appearance in the 1904 County Championship against Sussex. In four first-class matches, he scored 104 runs at an average of 17.33, with a highest score of 47. With his right-arm slow bowling, he took three wickets. He later returned to military service in the First World War, being appointed a railway transportation officer at Woolwich. In July 1916, he was made a commandant of a prisoner-of-war camp and was appointed a temporary lieutenant colonel whilst holding that command. After the end of the war, he was made an OBE in December 1919, to be antedated to June 1919. Richards died at Nottingham in November 1930.
