= William Hood =

William Hood may refer to:

- William Hood (art historian), American art historian
- William Hood (footballer) (1914–?), Northern Irish footballer
- William Hood (politician) (1844–1920), Australian politician
- William Hood (cricketer) (1848–1921), English cricketer
- William W. Hood III (born 1963), Colorado Supreme Court justice
- William Charles Hood (1824–1870), British medical doctor and psychiatrist
- William Hood (treasurer) (1832–1917), American politician and academic in South Carolina
- William Hood (MP), son of Thomas Hood (MP)
- Sir William Acland Hood, 6th Baronet (1901–1990) of the Hood baronets
- Billy Hood (1873–1947), English footballer

== See also ==
- Hood (surname)
