= Walter Phipps =

Walter Phipps may refer to:

- Walter Phipps (rugby union)
- Walter Phipps (cricketer)
