= Herbert Gardner =

Herbert Gardner may refer to:

- Herbert Gardner, 1st Baron Burghclere (1846–1921), British politician
- Herbert Gardner (cricketer) (1852–1924), English cricketer and solicitor
- Herb Gardner (1934–2003), American commercial artist, cartoonist and writer
- Herbert Gardner (rugby union), English international rugby union player

== See also ==
- Herb Gardiner (1891–1972), Canadian ice hockey player
