= Frederick Steele (disambiguation) =

Frederick Steele (1819–1868) was an American military general.

Frederick Steele may also refer to:

- Frederick Steele (cricketer) (1847–1915)
- Fred Steele (footballer) (b. 1869), Footballer for Manchester City see List of Manchester City F.C. players (1–24 appearances)
- Freddie Steele (1912–1984), American boxer and film actor
- Freddie Steele (footballer) (1916–1976), English footballer

== See also ==
- Frederic Dorr Steele (1873–1944), American illustrator
- Fred Steel (1884–before 1945), English footballer
