= William Higgins =

William Higgins may refer to:

== Sports ==
- Alexander Higgins (footballer, born 1870) (William Alexander Higgins, 1870–?), English footballer
- William Higgins (English cricketer) (1850–1926), English cricketer
- William Higgins (New Zealand cricketer) (1888–1968), New Zealand cricketer
- William Higgins (rugby league), rugby league footballer of the 1900s for Wales League XIII, and Ebbw Vale
- William Higgins (tennis), American tennis player of the 1960s and 1970s
- William S. Higgins (1894–1944), American college football player, coach, and official, college basketball coach, and dentist
- Bill Higgins (baseball) (1859–1919), American baseball player
- Bill Higgins (basketball) (born 1952), American basketball player
- Bill Higgins (hurler), Irish hurler
- Billy Higgins (karateka) (born 1945), British karateka
- Billy Higgins (Scottish footballer) (born 1940), Scottish footballer
- Billy Higgins (English footballer) (1924–1981), English football winger

== Politicians ==
- William J. Higgins (1880–1943), lawyer, judge and political figure in Newfoundland
- William L. Higgins (1867–1951), U.S. Representative from Connecticut

== Others ==
- William Higgins (chemist) (1763–1825), Irish chemist
- William Higgins (director) (1942–2019), American director of gay pornographic films
- William R. Higgins (1945–1990), United States Marine Corps colonel, killed in Lebanon
- William Victor Higgins (1884–1949), American painter and teacher
- Billy Higgins (vaudeville) (1888–1937), American vaudeville entertainer
- Billy Higgins (1936–2001), American jazz drummer
- William Higgins (high constable), first high constable of Toronto
- William Higgins (priest) (died 1666), Anglican priest

== See also ==
- William Higgins Coleman (1812–1863), English botanist
