= Lionel Booth =

Lionel Booth may refer to:

- Lionel Booth (politician), Irish politician and businessman
- Lionel Booth (cricketer), English cricketer and British Army officer
- Lionel F. Booth, United States Army officer
