= Vanderspar =

Vanderspar is a surname. Notable people with the surname include:

- Charles Vanderspar (1853–1877), English rugby union player
- George Vanderspar (1858–1940), English cricketer
- Will Vanderspar (born 1991), English cricketer
