= Sidney Wilson =

Sidney Wilson may refer to:

- Sidney Wilson (cricketer), English cricketer, broker and soldier
- Sidney Wilson (politician), Canadian politician
- Sid Wilson, American DJ and keyboardist
- Sydney Wilson, English snooker player
- Sydney Herbert Wilson, Fijian politician
- Sidney Wilson, 1974 Coronation Street character played by John Barrard
