= Frederick Ravenhill =

English cricketer (1837–1897)

Personal information
- Full name: Frederick Henry Harvey Ravenhill
- Born: 25 July 1837; Littlehampton, Sussex, England
- Died: 4 August 1897 (aged 60); Hove, Sussex, England
- Batting: Right-handed
- Relatives: Harry Ravenhill (brother); Arthur Chapman (brother-in-law)

Domestic team information
- Years: Team
- 1863–1867: Sussex

Career statistics
Competition	First-class
Matches	2
Runs scored	10
Batting average	3.33
100s/50s	–/–
Top score	7
Catches/stumpings	1/–
- Source: Cricinfo, 24 January 2012

Frederick Henry Harvey Ravenhill (25 July 1837 – 4 August 1897) was an English cricketer. Ravenhill was a right-handed batsman. He was born at Littlehampton, Sussex.

Ravenhill attended Pembroke College, Oxford, matriculating in 1856 and graduating B.A. in 1862, He made his first-class debut for Sussex against the Marylebone Cricket Club at the Royal Brunswick Ground, Hove in 1863. In this match, Ravenhill was dismissed for a duck by George Wootton in Sussex's first-innings, while in their second-innings he wasn't required to bat. He made a second first-class appearance for Sussex in 1867 against Kent at Ashford Road, Eastbourne. Ravenhill scored 3 runs in Sussex's first-innings, before he was dismissed by Bob Lipscomb, while in their second-innings he was dismissed by Edgar Willsher for 7 runs.

He died at Hove, Sussex on 4 August 1897. His brother, Harry, and brother-in-law, Arthur Chapman, both played first-class cricket.
