= Charles Hough =

Charles Hough may refer to:

- Charles Merrill Hough (1858–1927), American lawyer and federal judge in New York City
- Charles Hough Jr. (born 1934), American equestrian
- Charles Hough (cricketer) (1855–1933), English cricketer and physician
- Charlie Hough (Charles Oliver Hough, born 1948), American professional baseball player
