= Frederick Maude =

Frederick Maude may refer to:

- Frederick Francis Maude (1821–1897), British Victoria Cross recipient
- Sir Frederick Stanley Maude (1864–1917), son of the above, British officer and conqueror of Baghdad
- Frederick Maude (cricketer) (1857–1923), English cricketer
