= Arthur Chapman (English cricketer) =

English cricketer

Personal information
- Full name: Arthur George Chapman
- Born: 1 November 1834; Roehampton, Surrey, England
- Died: 27 November 1867 (aged 33); Brighton, Sussex, England
- Batting: Unknown
- Bowling: Unknown
- Relatives: Harry Ravenhill (brother-in-law); Frederick Ravenhill (brother-in-law)

Domestic team information
- Years: Team
- 1861–1863: Sussex
- 1860–1863: Marylebone Cricket Club

Career statistics
Competition	First-class
Matches	8
Runs scored	100
Batting average	7.14
100s/50s	–/–
Top score	33
Balls bowled	132
Wickets	4
Bowling average	23.00
5 wickets in innings	–
10 wickets in match	–
Best bowling	3/52
Catches/stumpings	1/–
- Source: Cricinfo, 23 June 2012

Arthur George Chapman (1 November 1834 – 27 November 1867) was an English cricketer. Chapman's batting and bowling styles are unknown. He was born at Roehampton, Surrey.

Chapman made his first-class debut for the Marylebone Cricket Club against Sussex at The Dripping Pan, Lewes in 1860. The following season he made two further first-class appearances for the Marylebone Cricket Club, against Cambridge University at Fenner's, and Oxford University at the Magdalen Ground, Oxford. It was in this season that Chapman made his debut for Sussex against the Marylebone Cricket Club at the Royal Brunswick Ground. He made a further first-class appearance for Sussex in 1862 against the same opponents. In the following season, Chapman made two further first-class appearances for the Marylebone Cricket Club, against Oxford University and Sussex, as well as appearing in a single match for Sussex against the Marylebone Cricket Club. In five first-class matches for the Marylebone Cricket Club, 35 runs at an average of 4.37, with a high score of 8. His three first-class matches for the Sussex yielded him 65 runs at an average of 10.83, with a high score of 33. With the ball, he took 4 wickets at a bowling average of 21.50, with best figures of 3/52.

He died at Brighton, Sussex, on 27 November 1867. His brothers-in-law, Harry and Frederick Ravenhill, both played first-class cricket.
