= Alfred Wilson (cricketer) =

English cricketer, barrister

Personal information
- Full name: Alfred Wilson
- Born: 28 May 1828; London, England
- Died: 2 January 1908 (aged 79); East Preston, Sussex, England
- Batting: Unknown
- Relatives: Sidney Wilson (son)

Domestic team information
- Years: Team
- 1848–1850: Oxford University
- 1851–1855: Marylebone Cricket Club

Career statistics
Competition	First-class
Matches	13
Runs scored	226
Batting average	10.27
100s/50s	–/–
Top score	43*
Catches/stumpings	2/–
- Source: Cricinfo, 4 April 2020

Alfred Wilson JP (24 May 1828 – 2 January 1908) was an English first-class cricketer and barrister.

The son of James Wilson, he was born at London in May 1828. He was educated at Rugby School, before going up to Exeter College, Oxford. While studying at Oxford, he played first-class cricket for Oxford University, making his debut against the Marylebone Cricket Club (MCC) in 1848. He played first-class cricket for Oxford until 1850, making eight appearances. In his eight first-class matches for Oxford, he scored 119 runs with a high score of 43 not out. In addition to playing for Oxford, Wilson also appeared in first-class cricket for the MCC on five occasions from 1851–55, scoring 107 runs with a high score of 28.

A student of Lincoln's Inn, he was called to the bar as a barrister in November 1857. He was a justice of the peace for both Essex and Kent. Wilson died in January 1908 at East Preston, Sussex. His son, Sidney, also played first-class cricket.
