= Charles Hall (cricketer, born 1848) =

English cricketer

Personal information
- Full name: Charles John Hall
- Born: 12 August 1848; Kingston upon Thames, Surrey, England
- Died: 18 November 1931 (aged 83); Heybridge, Essex, England
- Batting: Right-handed
- Bowling: Right-arm roundarm fast

Domestic team information
- Years: Team
- 1868–1873: Surrey

Career statistics
Competition	First-class
Matches	8
Runs scored	71
Batting average	5.91
100s/50s	–/–
Top score	15
Balls bowled	36
Wickets	1
Bowling average	13.00
5 wickets in innings	–
10 wickets in match	–
Best bowling	1/4
Catches/stumpings	1/–
- Source: Cricinfo, 23 June 2012

Charles John Hall (12 August 1848 – 18 November 1931) was an English cricketer. Hall was a right-handed batsman who bowled right-arm roundarm fast. He was born at Kingston upon Thames, Surrey.

Hall made his first-class debut for Surrey against the Marylebone Cricket Club in 1868 at The Oval. He made seven further first-class appearances for the county, the last of which came against Gloucestershire in 1873. In his eight first-class matches, he scored 71 runs at an average of 5.91, with a high score of 15. With the ball, he took a single wicket (that of the Marylebone Cricket Club's Arthur Becher in 1872).

He died at Heybridge, Essex, on 18 November 1931.
