= Herbert Phipps =

English cricketer and merchant

Personal information
- Full name: Herbert Gould Phipps
- Born: 8 August 1845; Shepton Mallet, Somerset, England
- Died: 19 October 1899 (aged 54); Tientsin, China
- Batting: Right-handed
- Bowling: Right-arm roundarm slow-medium
- Relatives: Walter Phipps (twin brother)

Domestic team information
- Years: Team
- 1865: Marylebone Cricket Club

Career statistics
Competition	First-class
Matches	2
Runs scored	9
Batting average	4.50
100s/50s	–/–
Top score	6*
Catches/stumpings	–/–
- Source: Cricinfo, 16 September 2021

Herbert Gould Phipps (8 August 1845 – 19 October 1899) was an English first-class cricketer and merchant.

The son of Arthur Constantine Phipps, he was born in August 1845 at Shepton Mallet and was educated at Harrow School, where he played for the cricket and football elevens. He later played first-class cricket for the Marylebone Cricket Club on two occasions in 1865 against the Surrey Club at The Oval and Lord's, scoring 9 runs across both matches. He was by profession a merchant in the British concession of Tientsin in China, where he died in October 1899. His twin brother, Walter, also played first-class cricket.
