= Joseph Greatorex =

English cricketer

Personal information
- Full name: Joseph Edward Alfred Greatorex
- Born: 7 March 1863; Kensington, Middlesex, England
- Died: 16 December 1940 (aged 77); Uppingham, Rutland, England
- Batting: Right-handed
- Bowling: Unknown-arm slow
- Relatives: Theophilus Greatorex (brother)

Domestic team information
- Years: Team
- 1882–1884: Marylebone Cricket Club

Career statistics
Competition	First-class
Matches	2
Runs scored	18
Batting average	6.00
100s/50s	–/–
Top score	12
Catches/stumpings	–/–
- Source: Cricinfo, 1 September 2021

Joseph Edward Alfred Greatorex (7 March 1863 — 16 December 1940) was an English first-class cricketer and architect.

The son of R. C. Greatorex, he was born in March 1863 at Kensington. He was educated at Harrow School, where he played for the school cricket eleven. He was described at Harrow as a "sound batsman" and featured in the Harrow v Eton match of 1881, taking figures of 5 for 35 with his slow bowling. Shortly after completing his education at Harrow, Greatorex made two appearances in first-class cricket for the Marylebone Cricket Club, against Hampshire at Southampton and Cambridge University at Fenner's. He scored 18 runs in these two matches, with a highest score of 12. Greatorex was by profession an architect. He died in December 1940 at Uppingham. His brother, Theophilus, was also a first-class cricketer.
