= Fraser Hore =

English cricketer

Personal information
- Full name: Fraser Salter Hore
- Born: 6 June 1835; Dulwich, Surrey, England
- Died: 7 July 1903 (aged 68); Westbourne, Hampshire, England
- Batting: Right-handed
- Bowling: Right-arm roundarm medium
- Relatives: Alexander Hore (brother)

Domestic team information
- Years: Team
- 1866: Marylebone Cricket Club
- 1861: Surrey

Career statistics
Competition	First-class
Matches	5
Runs scored	32
Batting average	5.33
100s/50s	–/–
Top score	9
Balls bowled	–
Wickets	–
Bowling average	–
5 wickets in innings	–
10 wickets in match	–
Best bowling	–
Catches/stumpings	1/–
- Source: Cricinfo, 3 April 2012

Fraser Salter Hore (6 June 1835 – 7 July 1903) was an English cricketer. Hore was a right-handed batsman who bowled right-arm roundarm medium. He was born at Dulwich, Surrey.

Hore made his first-class debut for Surrey against Yorkshire in 1861 at The Oval. He made a further first-class appearance in that same year for the Gentlemen of the South against the Gentlemen of the North at Trent Bridge. His next appearance in first-class cricket came for the Surrey Club against the Marylebone Cricket Club at Lord's in 1866, with him making two further first-class appearances in that year, one for the Gentlemen of the South against I Zingari and another for the Marylebone Cricket Club against Sussex. In his five first-class matches, Hore scored 32 runs at an average of 5.33, with a high score of 9.

He died at Westbourne, Hampshire on 7 July 1903. His brother Alexander also played first-class cricket.
