= Weston Jarvis =

British politician (1855–1939)

Colonel Sir (Alexander) Weston Jarvis, CMG, MVO, TD (26 December 1855 – 31 October 1939) was a British Conservative Party politician and officer in the British Army. He served in the Matabele Rebellion, Boer War and First World War.

He was the elder son of Lewis Whincop Jarvis and the former Emma Bowker; his father ran Jarvis & Jarvis, a local bank in King's Lynn which later became part of the Barclays Bank group. He was educated at Harrow School. His younger brother Lewis Jarvis was also a banker and was an all-round athlete and first-class cricketer.

He was elected as Member of Parliament (MP) for King's Lynn at a by-election in August 1886, and held the seat until the 1892 general election, when he did not stand for re-election. He gave his maiden speech on 6 April 1887, on the Criminal Law (Ireland) Amendment Bill. He was not an active Member, and spoke on only a few occasions during his tenure.

He had extensive business interests in Rhodesia, and spent a significant amount of time there. He was in the country during the Matabele Rebellion, and joined the volunteer forces there, eventually taking command of a squadron. He was again present at the outbreak of the Second Boer War in October 1899, and joined the Rhodesian contingent raised by Herbert Plumer for service in South Africa. He saw service at the Relief of Mafeking before returning to England, travelling back to South Africa three months later in command of the 21st Battalion of the Imperial Yeomanry. After seeing action under General Bruce Hamilton, his unit was employed on building blockhouses for the remainder of the war. At the end of the fighting, he was given an honorary lieutenant-colonelcy in the Army, and appointed a Companion of the Order of St Michael and St George (CMG).

Shortly before the end of the war, he formally transferred from the Derbyshire Yeomanry in April 1902 for the 3rd County of London Imperial Yeomanry (Sharpshooters), a unit formed from the 21st plus two other disbanded battalions of Imperial Yeomanry. He was still seconded to the Imperial Yeomanry when he left South Africa for England in July 1902, but after his return was confirmed as an officer in the Sharpshooters. He was later appointed in command of this regiment, and was still in command at the outbreak of the First World War, when the battalion took part (dismounted) in the Gallipoli Campaign. He returned home at the end of 1916 and then held a staff position with XIX Corps in France for the remainder of the war.

He was knighted on 26 February 1931, for his work as chairman of the council of the Royal Empire Society.

Parliament of the United Kingdom
Preceded by Robert Bourke	Member of Parliament for King's Lynn; 1886 – 1892	Succeeded by Thomas Gibson Bowles
