= Robert Curteis =

English cricketer

Personal information
- Full name: Robert Mascall Curteis
- Born: 12 October 1851; Hailsham, Sussex, England
- Died: 21 January 1927 (aged 75); Uckfield, Sussex, England
- Batting: Right-handed
- Relatives: Herbert Curteis, Sr. (father); Herbert Curteis, Jr. (brother)

Domestic team information
- Years: Team
- 1880–1881: Marylebone Cricket Club
- 1873–1878: Sussex

Career statistics
| Competition | First-class |
|---|---|
| Matches | 11 |
| Runs scored | 117 |
| Batting average | 6.88 |
| 100s/50s | –/– |
| Top score | 41 |
| Balls bowled | – |
| Wickets | – |
| Bowling average | – |
| 5 wickets in innings | – |
| 10 wickets in match | – |
| Best bowling | – |
| Catches/stumpings | 6/– |
- Source: Cricinfo, 14 July 2012

Robert Mascall Curteis (12 October 1851 – 21 January 1927) was an English cricketer. Curteis was a right-handed batsman. He was born at Hailsham, Sussex, and was educated at Westminster School.

Curteis made his first-class debut for Sussex against Kent in 1873 at Ashford, Eastbourne. His next appearance for Sussex in first-class cricket came against Gloucestershire in 1873, with Curteis making seven further first-class appearances for the county, the last of which came against the Marylebone Cricket Club in 1878. In his nine first-class matches for Sussex, he scored a total of 101 runs at an average of 7.21, with a high score of 41. He also made two first-class appearances for the Marylebone Cricket Club, both against Hampshire in 1880 and 1881.

He died at the town of his birth on 28 October 1919. His father, Herbert Sr., played first-class cricket, as did his brother Herbert Jr.
