= Arthur Becher (cricketer) =

English cricketer and British Indian Army soldier

Personal information
- Full name: Arthur William Reddie Becher
- Born: 6 December 1842; Allahabad, North-Western Provinces, British India
- Died: 25 March 1926 (aged 83); Maida Vale, London, England
- Batting: Unknown

Domestic team information
- Years: Team
- 1872: Marylebone Cricket Club

Career statistics
Competition	First-class
Matches	1
Runs scored	13
Batting average	6.50
100s/50s	–/–
Top score	8
Catches/stumpings	1/–
- Source: Cricinfo, 10 October 2021

Arthur William Reddie Becher (6 December 1842 – 25 March 1926) was an English first-class cricketer and an officer in the British Indian Army.

The son of the British Army General Sir Arthur Mitford Becher, he was born in British India at Allahabad in December 1842. He was commissioned into the Bengal Army as a cornet in December 1859, with promotion to lieutenant in January 1862. On a visit to England in 1872, Becher played a first-class cricket match for the Marylebone Cricket Club (MCC) against Surrey at Lord's. Batting twice in the match, he was dismissed for 8 runs in the MCC first innings by William Marten, while in their second innings he was dismissed by Charles Hall for 5 runs. Returning to military duty, he was promoted to brevet captain in December 1871, with him gaining the rank in full in December the following year. Promotion to major followed in December 1879, with a further promotion to lieutenant colonel coming in December 1885. Becher retired from active service in March 1892. He died in England at Maida Vale in March 1926.
