= William Richards (cricketer) =

English cricketer and clergyman (1833–1912)

Personal information
- Full name: William Henry Richards
- Born: 26 June 1833; Keevil, Wiltshire, England
- Died: 22 September 1912 (aged 79); Westridge, Isle of Wight, England
- Relatives: Arthur Richards (son)

Domestic team information
- Years: Team
- 1866: MCC

Career statistics
Competition	First-class
Matches	2
Runs scored	39
Batting average	19.50
100s/50s	0/0
Top score	20*
Catches/stumpings	0/–
- Source: Cricinfo, 27 April 2021

William Henry Richards JP (26 April 1833 – 22 September 1912) was an English first-class cricketer and clergyman.

The son of The Reverend Henry Richards, he was born in April 1833 at Keevil, Wiltshire. He was home schooled prior to going up to Jesus College, Cambridge. After graduating from Cambridge, Richards took holy orders in the Anglican Church in 1856, when he was ordained as a deacon at Ripon Cathedral. His first ecclesiastical post was as curate of Bishop Thornton in North Yorkshire from 1856 to 1862, before being appointed vicar of Grays from 1862 to 1872. While resident at Grays, Richards also served as a justice of the peace for Essex. Richards played first-class cricket for the Marylebone Cricket Club in 1866, making two appearances against Cambridge University at Fenner's and Hampshire at Lord's. He had little success in these matches, scoring 39 runs with a highest score of 20 not out. Richards was appointed his final ecclesiastical post in 1872 as vicar of St Helens on the Isle of Wight, a post he held until his retirement in 1900. He remained on the island in his retirement where he was resident at Westridge, where he died in September 1912 after a short illness. He had a son, Arthur, from his marriage to Alice Threlfall. Arthur was also a first-class cricketer.
