= Wembley Park Cricket Ground =

Cricket ground in Wembley, London, England

Ground information
- Location: Wembley, London
- Coordinates: 51.5598°N 0.2768°W
- Establishment: 1896 (first recorded match)

Team information
Wembley Park Cricket Club	(1896)
- As of 1 September 2010; Source: Ground profile

Wembley Park Cricket Ground was a cricket ground in Wembley Park, Wembley, London (formerly Middlesex). The first and only recorded match on the ground was in 1896, when Wembley Park Cricket Club played the touring Australians in what was Wembley Park's only appearance in first-class cricket. The ground was located in the northern area of Wembley Park. The whole area where it was situated was developed for the British Empire Exhibition and Wembley Stadium, and where the ground stood is today covered by the Wembley Retail Park.
