= James Norley =

English cricketer (1847–1900)

Personal information
- Full name: James Norley
- Born: 5 January 1847; Canterbury, Kent
- Died: 24 October 1900 (aged 53); Eastville, Bristol
- Batting: Right-handed

Domestic team information
- Years: Team
- 1870–1871: Kent
- 1877: Gloucestershire
- Source: Cricinfo, 4 April 2014

James Norley (5 January 1847 – 24 October 1900) was an English professional cricketer who played in the 1870s.

Norley was born at Canterbury in Kent and made his first-class cricket debut for Kent County Cricket Club in 1870. He played eight times between 1870 and 1871 before making a single first-class appearance for Gloucestershire in 1877.

Norley's brother, Fred, played for Kent in the mid-1860s. Norley died in 1900 at Eastville near Bristol aged 53.

== Bibliography ==
- Carlaw, Derek (2020). Kent County Cricketers, A to Z: Part One (1806–1914) (PDF). Cardiff: ACS.
