= William Moore (cricketer, born 1846) =

English cricketer

Personal information
- Full name: William Frederic Powell Moore
- Born: 23 March 1846; Westminster, London, England
- Died: 23 February 1919 (aged 72); Holborn, London, England
- Batting: Unknown

Domestic team information
- Years: Team
- 1870: Marylebone Cricket Club

Career statistics
| Competition | First-class |
|---|---|
| Matches | 2 |
| Runs scored | 21 |
| Batting average | 7.00 |
| 100s/50s | –/– |
| Top score | 19* |
| Catches/stumpings | 2/– |
- Source: Cricinfo, 23 June 2019

William Frederic Powell Moore (23 March 1846 – 23 February 1919) was an English first-class cricketer.

Moore made his debut in first-class cricket for the Marylebone Cricket Club against Gloucestershire at Lord's in 1870. Nine years later he made a second appearance in first-class cricket for the Gentlemen of England against the Gentlemen of Kent at Canterbury. He scored 21 runs across these two matches, with a high score of 19 not out. He died at Holborn in February 1919.
