= Edmund Sutton (cricketer) =

English cricketer

Edmund George Gresham Sutton (12 October 1844 – 7 October 1903) was an English first-class cricketer active 1864–73 who played for Middlesex and Marylebone Cricket Club (MCC). He was born in Marylebone; died in Tring.
