= George Mumford (cricketer) =

English cricketer

George Mumford (1 February 1845 – 12 November 1877) was an English cricketer.

Mumford was born at Ealing in 1845 and was employed as a professional bowler by the MCC. He played regularly for the side in non first-class matches, both opening the batting and bowling. He played in four first-class cricket matches, two for MCC sides and two for Middlesex County Cricket Club. Three of these matches took place in 1867, with his final first-class match taking place in 1872.

Mumford died of tuberculosis at Ealing in 1877. He was aged 32.
