= Charles Bulpett =

English cricketer, hunter, and barrister

Charles William Lloyd Bulpett (18 August 1852 – 11 July 1939) was Barrister, Big Game Hunter and an English first-class cricketer active 1877–82 who played for Middlesex. He was born in Chertsey; died in Nairobi.

Bulpett was educated at Rugby School and Trinity College, Oxford, he was a double blue in both Cricket and Athletics. He met with H A Hamilton of Trinity College, Cambridge, to discuss setting up the first Varsity Rugby Match in 1872. He also played in Oxford's victorious team that year. He emigrated to Kenya in 1904.
