= Edward Follett =

English cricketer

Personal information
- Full name: Edward Charles Follett
- Born: 16 February 1842; Westminster, Middlesex, England
- Died: 6 June 1869 (aged 27); Birmingham, Warwickshire, England
- Batting: Right-handed
- Bowling: Unknown-arm roundarm slow

Domestic team information
- Years: Team
- 1868: Marylebone Cricket Club

Career statistics
Competition	First-class
Matches	1
Runs scored	3
Batting average	1.50
100s/50s	–/–
Top score	3
Catches/stumpings	–/–
- Source: Cricinfo, 9 May 2021

Edward Charles Follett (16 February 1842 – 6 June 1869) was an English first-class cricketer.

The son of Sir William Webb Follett, he was born in February 1842 at Westminster. He was educated at Eton College, before going up to Balliol College, Oxford. While studying law at Oxford, Follett was also a student of the Inner Temple. He played first-class cricket for the Marylebone Cricket Club against Oxford University at Oxford in 1868. Opening the batting, he was dismissed twice in the match by Robert Miles for scores of 0 and 3. Follett died at Birmingham in June 1869.
