= Frederick Norley =

English cricketer (1845–1914)

Frederick Norley (23 February 1845 – 1914) was an English cricketer. Between 1864 and 1865, he played for Kent County Cricket Club in seven first-class cricket matches.

== Biography ==
Norley was born on 23 February 1845, in Canterbury, the son of James Norley and Emma Norley. His father was a tailor and Norley grew up in the city. He is first known to have played cricket in 1863, appearing for Kent Colts that year and the next.

Making his debut as a professional bowler in 1864, Norley played in Kent's first six matches of the season, all of them losses. He bowled intermittently, but took a five-wicket haul against Surrey at Gravesend, the only one of his first-class career. He played in Kent's first match of the following season and was employed by Marylebone Cricket Club (MCC) as a professional at Lord's in 1865, playing one match for them as well as appearing in club games, and umpiring matches.

In 1866, Norley was employed by the Clydeside Cricket Club at Glasgow and in 1868 by St George's Cricket Club in Manhattan, New York. He remained as a player and groundsman with St George's throughout the 1870s before moving to Canada during the 1880s. In 1884, he was employed as a coach and groundsman by Trinity College School at Port Hope, Ontario.

In 1869, Norley married Clara Nesbitt, with whom he had two daughters. His younger brother, James, played for Kent and Gloucestershire in the 1870s. He died in 1914, aged 68 or 68, in Ontario.

== Bibliography ==
- Carlaw, Derek (2020). Kent County Cricketers, A to Z: Part One (1806–1914) (PDF). Cardiff: ACS.
