= Michael Flanagan (cricketer) =

English cricketer (1842–1890)

Michael Flanagan (15 March 1842 – 14 January 1890) was an English first-class cricketer active 1873–78 who played for Middlesex. He was born in Glen Colombkill, County Clare; died in Paddington.
