= Charles Kemp (English cricketer) =

English cricketer

Charles William Middleton Kemp (26 April 1856 – 15 May 1933) was an English cricketer who played first-class cricket for Oxford University, Kent and the Marylebone Cricket Club in 1878. He was born in Forest Hill, London and died at Ightham, Kent.

Kemp was educated at Harrow School, where he was captain of the cricket team in 1875, and at Oriel College, Oxford. His first-class cricket was confined to the 1878 season, when he appeared in three Oxford University games, once playing for MCC against the Oxford team, and a single match for Kent. A right-handed lower-order batsman and a right-arm slow round-arm bowler, he had little success as batsman or bowler; in the 1878 University Match against Cambridge University, he was the not-out batsman when Oxford were dismissed in their second innings for just 32 to lose the match by 238 runs.

Two of his brothers, Manley and Arthur, also played first-class cricket for Kent, and Manley, an all-round sportsman, played for and captained Oxford University too.

== Bibliography ==
- Carlaw, Derek (2020). Kent County Cricketers, A to Z: Part One (1806–1914) (PDF). Cardiff: ACS.
