= Manley Kemp =

English schoolmaster and sportsman

Personal information
- Full name: Manley Colchester Kemp
- Born: 7 September 1861; Forest Hill, London
- Died: 30 June 1951 (aged 89); Aylesbury, Buckinghamshire
- Batting: Right-handed
- Role: Wicket-keeper
- Relatives: Charles Kemp (brother); Arthur Kemp (brother)

Domestic team information
- Years: Team
- 1880–1895: Kent
- 1881–1884: Oxford University
- FC debut: 1 September 1879; Gentlemen of the South v Gentlemen of the North
- Last FC: 31 August 1895 Kent v Middlesex

Career statistics
| Competition | First-class |
|---|---|
| Matches | 134 |
| Runs scored | 3,040 |
| Batting average | 15.83 |
| 100s/50s | 1/6 |
| Top score | 175 |
| Catches/stumpings | 172/73 |
- Source: CricInfo, 19 May 2016

Manley Colchester Kemp (7 September 1861 – 30 June 1951) was an English schoolmaster and sportsman, known particularly for a first-class cricket career that extended from 1880 to 1895.

== Life ==
He was born at Forest Hill, London, one of the four sons of Charles Fitch Kemp (died 1907), a leading chartered accountant. Two of his brothers, Charles and Arthur, also played first-class cricket for Kent, and Charles played for Oxford University too. The youngest son, Harold Fitch Kemp, played for the Harrow School XI, as did all the brothers. He followed his father in becoming President of the Institute of Chartered Accountants.

At Harrow School, Kemp was captain of the cricket team and also won the public schools rackets championship in both 1879 and 1880. At Oxford University, he matriculated in 1880 and was a scholar at Hertford College.

Kemp won Blues at Oxford for rackets and for soccer as well as playing for the Oxford cricket team in the University Match in each of his four seasons at the university. He then became a schoolmaster at Winchester College for three years from 1885, before returning to Harrow as a master, where he remained involved with school sports, particularly cricket, up to the end of his life, though he retired from teaching in 1921.

== Cricketer ==
Kemp had already appeared in first-class cricket before he went to Oxford, being picked for a "Gentlemen of the South" team in 1879 and for Kent and a Gentlemen of Kent team in 1880. He was a right-handed batsman who usually played in the middle order and a wicketkeeper, though he did not always keep wicket when he played for Kent.

As a batsman, Kemp's figures appear unimpressive to modern eyes, but he produced occasional innings of brilliance. As captain of the Oxford University team in both 1883 and 1884, he led the 1884 team to an unexpected victory over the full Australian touring team, making an unbeaten 63 out of an unbroken fourth-wicket partnership of 76. After leaving Oxford University, his first-class cricket was confined largely to the August school holidays, though he played almost a whole season in 1886; in that year, he made his highest score and only century, an innings of 175 for the Gentlemen of England cricket team against Cambridge University, made out of a total of 298 after the first six wickets had been lost for just 21 runs. He played in the Gentlemen v Players matches from 1883 to 1885. He did not appear in first-class cricket after 1895.

== Death ==
Kemp died at Aylesbury, Buckinghamshire, on 30 June 1951.
