= William Armitstead =

English cricketer

Personal information
- Full name: William George Armitstead
- Born: 22 March 1833; Holmes Chapel, Cheshire, England
- Died: 12 March 1907 (aged 73); Goostrey, Cheshire, England
- Batting: Right-handed
- Role: Batsman

Domestic team information
- Years: Team
- 1853–1857: Oxford University
- 1852: Manchester
- 1862: Gentlemen of the North
- 1864: MCC

Career statistics
Competition	First-class
Matches	14
Runs scored	293
Batting average	12.20
100s/50s	0/0
Top score	38
Balls bowled	?
Wickets	2
Bowling average	?
5 wickets in innings	0
10 wickets in match	0
Best bowling	2/?
Catches/stumpings	6/–
- Source: CricketArchive, 31 May 2014

William George Armitstead (22 March 1833 – 12 March 1907) was an English first-class cricketer. A right-handed batsman, Armitstead was a member of a cricketing family: his brother Henry played first-class cricket, while brothers John and Robert, and nephew William, all played school cricket. Armitstead played fourteen first-class matches between 1853 and 1862, the majority for Oxford University with solitary appearances for the Gentlemen of the North, Manchester Cricket Club, and the Marylebone Cricket Club.

Armitstead was also a founding member of the Free Foresters Cricket Club, along with his brother Henry. It was during a match between a United England XI and the Free Foresters in 1861 that he is credited with the introduction of the white coat for cricket umpires. Armitstead requested that the umpires wear something white, as their existing garments were causing him to lose sight of the ball and the bowler's hand during delivery.

Armitstead had a modest batting record, scoring only 293 runs in twenty-five innings at a batting average of 12.20. 249 of these runs were made for Oxford, for whom he made eleven appearances. His best was a score of 38, made opening the batting against the Marylebone Cricket Club on 3 June 1853. He took six catches, and is noted as having bowled however his bowling style or statistics are not recorded.

He also played non-first-class at county level for Oxfordshire, Cheshire (while also playing at club level for Sandbach), and one match in 1863 for Shropshire.

Armitstead was educated at Westminster School and Christ Church, Oxford where he graduated B.A. in 1857 and M.A. in 1862. After graduating at Oxford he was ordained as a Church of England deacon in 1859 and priest in 1860 by the Bishop of Chester. He was vicar of Goostrey, Cheshire, from 1862 until his death there in 1907.
