= Thomas Brown (cricketer, born 1863) =

English cricketer

Personal information
- Full name: Thomas Austin Brown
- Born: 11 April 1863; Wollaston, Northamptonshire, England
- Died: 12 March 1930 (aged 66); Dunstable, Bedfordshire, England
- Batting: Right-handed
- Bowling: Right-arm fast

Domestic team information
- Years: Team
- 1897–1899: Northamptonshire
- 1895–1907: Bedfordshire
- 1894–1901: Marylebone Cricket Club

Umpiring information
- FC umpired: 246 (1897–1922)

Career statistics
Competition	First-class
Matches	12
Runs scored	333
Batting average	17.52
100s/50s	–/1
Top score	64*
Balls bowled	693
Wickets	12
Bowling average	28.50
5 wickets in innings	1
10 wickets in match	–
Best bowling	6/82
Catches/stumpings	9/–
- Source: Cricinfo, 8 October 2013

Thomas Austin Brown (11 April 1863 – 12 March 1930) was an English cricketer active in the 1890s and in the first decade of the 1900s. Born at Wollaston, Northamptonshire, Brown was a right-handed batsman and right-arm fast bowler, who played mostly minor counties cricket, but also made twelve appearances in first-class cricket.

== Career ==
Brown made his first-class debut in 1894 for the Marylebone Cricket Club (MCC) against Leicestershire at Lord's, a season in which he made two further first-class appearances for the MCC against Yorkshire and Cambridge University. The following season he played in Bedfordshire's inaugural Minor Counties Championship match against Wiltshire. In that same season he toured Ireland with the MCC, playing in the only first-class match on the tour against Dublin University, as well playing against Kent later in the English season. He appeared once in first-class cricket for the MCC in 1896 against Essex, but didn't feature for Bedfordshire in minor counties cricket. He joined Northamptonshire in 1897, making his debut for the county against Staffordshire in the Minor Counties Championship. Brown played for Northamptonshire until 1899, during which time he made 24 appearances for the county in minor counties cricket. 1899 also saw him play a single first-class match for the MCC against Nottinghamshire.

He rejoined Bedfordshire in 1900, in addition to making three first-class appearances for the MCC in that season. This was followed in 1901 by two final first-class appearances for the MCC against Lancashire and Kent. Brown continued to play minor counties cricket for Bedfordshire until 1907, making a total of 73 appearances for the county in his second—spell, to add to the eight appearances in made in his debut season of 1895. In all, Brown made twelve first-class appearances, all for the MCC. In these he scored a total of 333 runs at an average of 17.52, with a high score of 64 not out, which came against Leicestershire on his first-class debut in 1894. Described by Wisden as a ″good fast right-handed bowler″, Brown took 12 wickets at an average of 28.50, with one five wicket haul of 6/82, which came against Cambridge University in 1900.

Brown was also a noted umpire, first standing as one in first-class cricket in 1897. After a decline in his health led to Brown giving up playing, he stood regularly as an umpire. Between 1906 and 1922, he stood in 243 first-class matches. He died at Dunstable, Bedfordshire on 12 March 1930.
