= Westridge, Isle of Wight =

Coordinates: 50.713°N 1.145°W

Westridge is an area on the edge of Ryde on the Isle of Wight, based on the road junction of Westridge Cross. Its location on the outskirts of the largest town on the Island, around 1 1/2 miles from Ryde town centre, has led to the development of a number of out-of-town commercial and industrial units. A large Tesco Extra store in the area on the site of the former Ryde Airport. A garden centre has been developed opposite the Tesco Store and a golf centre to the other side. There is a long-established garage at Westridge Cross and another adjacent to the site of the former airport terminal building. Public transport is provided by Southern Vectis buses on route 3. Wightbus also provide route 20 to the Tesco store.
