= Alexander Hore =

English cricketer and clergyman

Personal information
- Full name: Alexander Hugh Hore
- Born: 24 September 1829; Camberwell, Surrey, England
- Died: 7 April 1903 (aged 73); Cheltenham, Gloucestershire, England
- Batting: Unknown
- Bowling: Unknown

Domestic team information
- Years: Team
- 1851: Oxford University

Career statistics
Competition	First-class
Matches	1
Runs scored	2
Batting average	2.00
100s/50s	–/–
Top score	2
Balls bowled	?
Wickets	1
Bowling average	?
5 wickets in innings	–
10 wickets in match	–
Best bowling	1/?
Catches/stumpings	1/–
- Source: Cricinfo, 14 May 2020

Alexander Hugh Hore (24 September 1829 – 7 April 1903) was an English first-class cricketer and clergyman.

The son of James Hore, he was born in September 1829 at Camberwell. He was educated at Tonbridge School, before going up to Trinity College, Oxford. While studying at Oxford, he made a single appearance in first-class cricket for Oxford University against the Cambridge University at Lord's in The University Match of 1851. Batting twice in the match, he was dismissed for 2 runs by Edward Blore in the Oxford first innings, while in the Oxford second innings of 140 all out, he was unbeaten without scoring. In a match which Cambridge won by an innings and 4 runs, Hore took one wicket in the Cambridge innings, that of William Norris.

After graduating from Oxford, Hore took holy orders in the Church of England in 1873. His first ecclesiastical post was as curate of Plympton from 1859 to 1862, before serving as a Chaplain to the Forces from 1861 to 1874. He retired in 1874, after which he resided at Eastbourne and wrote a number of books on the church. Hore later moved to Cheltenham, where he died suddenly in April 1903.
