= Thomas Fowler (cricketer) =

English cricketer and barrister

Personal information
- Full name: Thomas Frederick Fowler
- Born: 12 March 1841; Kennington, Surrey, England
- Died: 7 January 1915 (aged 73); Woolston, Hampshire, England
- Batting: Right-handed
- Bowling: Right-arm roundarm fast

Domestic team information
- Years: Team
- 1863–1864: Cambridge University
- 1864–1867: Marylebone Cricket Club

Career statistics
Competition	First-class
Matches	10
Runs scored	208
Batting average	18.90
100s/50s	–/–
Top score	38*
Balls bowled	273
Wickets	9
Bowling average	10.88
5 wickets in innings	1
10 wickets in match	–
Best bowling	5/37
Catches/stumpings	6/–
- Source: Cricinfo, 27 April 2021

Thomas Frederick Fowler (12 March 1841 – 7 January 1915) was an English first-class cricketer and solicitor.

The son of George Fowler, he was born at Kennington in March 1841. He was educated at both Giggleswick School and Uppingham School, captaining the school cricket team for the latter. From Uppingham he went up to Christ's College, Cambridge. While studying at Cambridge, he played first-class cricket for Cambridge University in 1863 and 1864, making four appearances. He scored 84 runs in these four matches, with a highest score of 34 not out. He also took 9 wickets with his right-arm roundarm fast, including a five wicket haul against the Marylebone Cricket Club (MCC) in 1864. Having played in The University Match against Oxford in 1864, Fowler gained his cricket blue. Fowler also played for the MCC from 1864 to 1867, making six appearances. He scored 124 runs for the MCC, with a highest score of 38 not out. He was secretary for the first incarnation of Huntingdonshire County Cricket Club and also played minor matches for Huntingdonshire between 1862 and 1879. Fowler was admitted as a solicitor in 1868, practising at Huntingdon. He died in January 1915 at Woolston, Hampshire.
