= Frederic Willett =

English cricketer

Personal information
- Full name: Frederic Stovin Dealtry Willett
- Born: 10 November 1853; Marylebone, Middlesex, England
- Died: 23 April 1884 (aged 30); Ventnor, Isle of Wight, England
- Batting: Right-handed
- Bowling: Right-arm roundarm fast

Domestic team information
- Years: Team
- 1882: Marylebone Cricket Club

Career statistics
Competition	First-class
Matches	1
Runs scored	9
Batting average	4.50
100s/50s	–/–
Top score	9
Catches/stumpings	–/–
- Source: Cricinfo, 26 August 2021

Frederic Stovin Dealtry Willett (10 November 1853 – 23 April 1884) was an English first-class cricketer.

The son of the physician Edmund Sparshall Willett, he was born at Marylebone in November 1853. He was educated at Rugby School, before going up to Caius College, Cambridge. Willett later made a single appearance in first-class cricket for the Marylebone Cricket Club (MCC) against Cambridge University at Fenner's in 1882. Batting twice in the match, he was dismissed for 4 runs in the MCC first innings by Robert Ramsay, while in their second innings he was dismissed for 5 runs by C. Aubrey Smith. Willett died at Ventnor on the Isle of Wight in April 1884, aged 30.
