= William Green (cricketer, born 1852) =

English cricketer

Personal information
- Full name: William Barham Green
- Born: August 1852; St Kilda, Victoria, Australia
- Died: 18 January 1924 (aged 71); North Chailey, Sussex, England
- Batting: Unknown

Domestic team information
- Years: Team
- 1880–1884: Marylebone Cricket Club

Career statistics
Competition	First-class
Matches	4
Runs scored	53
Batting average	8.83
100s/50s	–/–
Top score	21
Catches/stumpings	–/–
- Source: Cricinfo, 20 October 2021

William Barham Green (August 1852 — 18 January 1924) was an English first-class cricketer.

The son of E. B. Green, he was born in Australia at St Kilda in August 1852. After moving to England, he was educated at Eton College. He played first-class cricket for the Marylebone Cricket Club from 1880 to 1884, making three appearances against Cambridge University and one appearance against Hampshire. He scored 53 runs in his four matches, with a highest score of 21. He additionally played minor matches for Hertfordshire from 1875 to 1885. A farmer by profession, he died in January 1924 at North Chailey, Sussex.
