= William Hutchinson (British Army officer) =

British Army officer and English cricketer

Major-General William Hutchinson
- Born: William Francis Moore Hutchinson; 3 February 1841; Bishopsgate, City of London, England
- Died: 22 April 1917 (aged 76); Eastbourne, Sussex, England
- Military career
- Allegiance: United Kingdom
- Branch: British Army
- Service years: 1857–1909
- Rank: Major-General
- Unit: Royal Artillery
- Cricket career

Cricket information

Domestic team information
- Years: Team
- 1869: Marylebone Cricket Club

Career statistics
Competition	First-class
Matches	1
Runs scored	1
Batting average	1.00
100s/50s	0/0
Top score	1
Catches/stumpings	0/–
- Source: William Hutchinson (British Army officer) CricInfo, 4 August 2025

Major-General William Francis Moore Hutchinson (3 February 1841 – 22 April 1917) was a British Army officer and English first-class cricketer.

Born at Bishopsgate in the City of London in February 1841, Hutchinson was commissioned into the Royal Artillery as a lieutenant in October 1857. His first promotion came in July 1869, when he was promoted to second captain. In the same year as this promotion, Hutchinson made a single appearance in first-class cricket for the Marylebone Cricket Club (MCC) against Hampshire at Lord's. Batting once in what was an innings victory for the MCC, he was dismissed for a single run by Henry Tate.

He became a major in October 1877, before being promoted to lieutenant colonel in October 1884. Hutchinson was promoted to colonel in April 1889. During the 1890s he was the commanding officer of the Royal Artillery at Curragh Camp, an appointment which last until April 1896. He was made a temporary major general upon his appointment to deputy adjutant-general at the Royal Artillery headquarters in August 1897, where he served in the capacity of deputy adjutant-general to Major-General Arthur Yeatman-Biggs. He was appointed colonel commandant of the Royal Artillery in September 1909, in place of the late Major-General Sir Henry James Alderson. Hutchinson died at Eastbourne in April 1917.

Hutchinson married Charlotte Annie Susan Woodford, the daughter of Lieutenant Alexander George Woodford and granddaughter of Field-Marshal Sir Alexander Woodford, in 1872. Together they had a son in 1874, William Arthur Hutchinson, who became a major in the Royal Munster Fusiliers.
