= William Blacker (cricketer) =

Irish cricketer (1853–1907)

Personal information
- Born: 29 September 1853; Dublin, Ireland
- Died: 21 November 1907 (aged 54); Weston Straffan, Co Kildare, Ireland
- Source: Cricinfo, 10 April 2017

William Blacker (29 September 1853 – 21 November 1907) was an Irish cricketer. He played 32 first-class matches for Cambridge University Cricket Club between 1873 and 1876.

He was educated at Harrow School.

== See also ==
- List of Cambridge University Cricket Club players
