= Thomas Spyers =

English cricketer and schoolmaster

Personal information
- Full name: Thomas Roper Spyers
- Born: 17 December 1868; Faversham, Kent, England
- Died: 19 February 1961 (aged 92); Chelsea, London, England
- Batting: Right-handed

Domestic team information
- Years: Team
- 1890: Marylebone Cricket Club

Career statistics
Competition	First-class
Matches	1
Runs scored	9
Batting average	4.50
100s/50s	–/–
Top score	9
Catches/stumpings	1/–
- Source: Cricinfo, 13 August 2021

Thomas Roper Spyers (7 December 1868 – 19 February 1961) was an English first-class cricketer and educator.

The son of Thomas Charles Spyers, he was born at Faversham in December 1868. He was educated at Radley College, before going up to Keble College, Oxford. He played for and captained the Keble College cricket team, but did not feature for Oxford University Cricket Club. While studying at Oxford in 1890, he did appear in a single first-class cricket match for the Marylebone Cricket Club (MCC) against Yorkshire at Lord's. Batting twice in the match, he was dismissed for 9 runs in the MCC first innings by Ted Wainwright, while following-on in their second innings he was dismissed without scoring by the same bowler. After graduating from Oxford, Spyers became an assistant master at Radley College, a post he held until 1903. He later became the proprietor of the Newlands Corner Hotel in Guildford. Spyers died at Chelsea in February 1961.
