= Arnold Rylott =

English cricketer

Personal information
- Born: 18 February 1839; Grantham, Lincolnshire, England
- Died: 17 April 1914 (aged 75); Sandy, Bedfordshire, England
- Batting: Right-handed
- Bowling: Left-arm fast

Domestic team information
- Years: Team
- 1872–1888: Marylebone Cricket Club
- FC debut: 9 May 1870 Left-Handed v Right-Handed
- Last FC: 21 May 1888 MCC v Cambridge University

Career statistics
Competition	First-class
Matches	85
Runs scored	703
Batting average	6.33
100s/50s	0/0
Top score	45
Balls bowled	16,932
Wickets	456
Bowling average	11.69
5 wickets in innings	39
10 wickets in match	14
Best bowling	9/30
Catches/stumpings	64/–
- Source: CricketArchive, March 2013

Arnold Rylott (18 February 1839 – 17 April 1914) was an English cricketer who played for Marylebone Cricket Club (MCC) from 1872 to 1888 and for pre-first-class Leicestershire between 1875 and 1890.

Rylott was born in Grantham, Lincolnshire. He began his professional cricket career 1867 at the Birkenhead Club, and stayed there for three years until he was employed at Grantham from 1870 to 1871. He made his first-class cricket debut in 1870 for Left Handed. In 1872 he joined the ground staff at Lord's and eventually became head of the ground staff. He also played as a soccer midfielder for Grantham Town on 20 October 1874 against the Third Volunteer Lincolnshire RIfles. Most of his 85 first-class cricket matches were for the MCC. Still, he played for England, England XI, Players, North, Players of the North, United North of England, Orleans Club, Single and Over 30. In 1875, he qualified to play cricket for Leicestershire in their pre-first-class days. He also played a game for Staffordshire in 1877.

Rylott was a left-arm fast bowler and took 456 first-class wickets at an average of 11.69 and a best performance of nine for 30. He was a right-handed tail-end batsman and played 137 innings in 85 first-class matches with an average of 6.33 and a top score of 45.

Rylott umpired occasionally until he retired from playing and became a regular umpire until 1901. He was the author of a book of verse called Our Bobby Rylott when a Boy.

Rylott died of pneumonia at Sandy, Bedfordshire, at the age of 75.
