= Harry Ravenhill =

English cricketer and British Army officer

Personal information
- Full name: Edward Harry Goring Ravenhill
- Born: 11 November 1845; Lyminster, Sussex, England
- Died: 1 March 1924 (aged 78); Brentwood, Essex, England
- Batting: Unknown
- Relatives: Frederick Ravenhill (brother); Arthur Chapman (brother-in-law)

Domestic team information
- Years: Team
- 1882: Marylebone Cricket Club

Career statistics
Competition	First-class
Matches	1
Runs scored	9
Batting average	4.50
100s/50s	–/–
Top score	6
Catches/stumpings	–/–
- Source: Cricinfo, 10 August 2021

Edward Harry Goring Ravenhill (11 November 1845 — 1 March 1924) was an English first-class cricketer and British Army officer.

The son of Edward Ravenhill, he was born in November 1845 at Lyminster, Sussex. Ravenhill initially served in the British Army as an officer in the 85th Foot. Entering as an ensign, he purchased the rank of lieutenant in July 1867. He served in Ireland in the 1860s, where he played cricket for Sandymount Cricket Club and appeared for the Ireland cricket team against I Zingari at the Vice Regal Ground in Phoenix Park. Ravenhill was promoted to captain in February 1876. He continued to play services cricket, appearing for the Southern Division against the Marylebone Cricket Club (MCC) in 1876, before making a single first-class appearance for the MCC against Hampshire at Southampton in 1882. He batted twice in the match, scoring 3 runs in the MCC first innings before he was dismissed by H. H. Armstrong, while in their second innings he was dismissed for 6 runs by Charles Young. By 1882 he was serving as a Major in the King's Shropshire Light Infantry. He was a late replacement for Ireland in 1883 for their match against Aldershot Division, where he dismissed a player also named Ravenhill; this could conceivably be his brother Frederick.

He was promoted to lieutenant colonel in August 1889, before being made a brevet colonel in January 1894. While serving with the Shropshire Light Infantry, he played minor cricket matches for Shropshire. Ravenhill was transferred to the Essex Regiment in April 1895 to command the 44th Regimental District, where he was promoted to the full rank of colonel. He later commanded the 25th Regimental District of the King's Own Scottish Borderers, a post he held until September 1902, prior to being placed on the retired list in November of the same year. Ravenhill died at Brentwood in March 1924, being survived by his wife Eliza Walpole Lacon, daughter of Sir Henry Lacon, 3rd Baronet.
