= Frederic Tobin =

English cricketer and clergyman

Personal information
- Full name: Frederic Tobin
- Born: 5 July 1849; Liscard, Cheshire, England
- Died: 28 September 1914 (aged 65); Folkestone, Kent, England
- Batting: Right-handed

Domestic team information
- Years: Team
- 1870–1872: Cambridge University

Career statistics
Competition	First-class
Matches	13
Runs scored	369
Batting average	16.77
100s/50s	–/2
Top score	77
Catches/stumpings	8/–
- Source: Cricinfo, 26 January 2023

Frederic Tobin (5 July 1849 – 28 September 1914) was an English clergyman and cricketer who played first-class cricket for Marylebone Cricket Club (MCC) and Cambridge University between 1870 and 1872. He was born at Liscard, Wallasey, then in Cheshire and died at Folkestone, Kent.

The son of the vicar of Liscard, whose forebears were the builders of Liscard Hall, Tobin was educated at Rugby School and St John's College, Cambridge. As a cricketer, he was a right-handed batsman often used as an opener. His first first-class game in 1870 was an appearance for MCC against Cambridge University: a common practice at the time to try out new players for the university sides. In the return game, he was Cambridge's top scorer with 33 in the first innings, and that was sufficient to put him into the 1870 University Match against Oxford University, where he scored 13 and 2 in a game which ended sensationally with a Cambridge victory by just two runs, and which has become known as "Cobden's Match" after the bowler who secured the victory. In 1871, he scored his first half-century, with 63 in the game against the Gentlemen of England team, and was again selected for the University Match. His highest first-class score was 77, made against Surrey in 1872, when he was again awarded a Blue by appearing in the University Match. After the 1872 University Match, Tobin did not appear in any further first-class cricket, though he played a couple of minor matches in 1885 for Warwickshire, not then a first-class team.

Tobin graduated from Cambridge University with a Bachelor of Arts degree in 1872, and this was automatically converted to a Master of Arts in 1875. He was ordained as a Church of England deacon in 1873 and as a priest the following year. He served as a curate at Croydon to 1875 and then at Caversham, Berkshire. He became vicar of Charlecote, Warwickshire in 1884 and remained there until his death in 1914.
