= William Hay (English cricketer) =

English cricketer

Personal information
- Born: 21 January 1849; London, England
- Died: 3 March 1925 (aged 76); Great Bowden, Leicestershire, England
- Source: ESPNcricinfo, 14 May 2016

William Hay (21 January 1849 – 3 March 1925) was an English cricketer. He played three first-class matches for Marylebone Cricket Club between 1875 and 1877.
