= John Maude (cricketer) =

English cricketer and solicitor

Personal information
- Born: 17 March 1850; York, Yorkshire, England
- Died: 17 November 1934 (aged 84); Oberhofen, Bern, Switzerland
- Batting: Unknown
- Bowling: Left-arm medium

Domestic team information
- Years: Team
- 1873: Marylebone Cricket Club
- 1873: Oxford University

Career statistics
| Competition | First-class |
|---|---|
| Matches | 5 |
| Runs scored | 25 |
| Batting average | 6.25 |
| 100s/50s | –/– |
| Top score | 12* |
| Balls bowled | 844 |
| Wickets | 23 |
| Bowling average | 11.08 |
| 5 wickets in innings | 2 |
| 10 wickets in match | – |
| Best bowling | 6/14 |
| Catches/stumpings | 2/– |
- Source: Cricinfo, 2 April 2020

John Maude (17 March 1850 – 17 November 1934) was an English first-class cricketer and solicitor.

The son of Thomas James Maude, he was born at York in March 1850. He was educated at Eton College, where he was tutored by George Yonge. From Eton, he went up to Lincoln College, Oxford. He played first-class cricket while studying at Oxford in 1873, making his debut for the Marylebone Cricket Club (MCC) against Oxford University at Oxford. He followed this up by playing four first-class matches for Oxford University, including in The University Match at Lord's against Cambridge University where he took figures of 6 for 39 in the Cambridge second-innings. In five first-class matches, Maude took 23 wickets at an average of 11.08 and twice took five wickets in an innings.

After graduating from Oxford, he became a solicitor. He was articled to the law firm Rickards & Walker at Lincoln's Inn Fields, becoming a partner in 1877. Maude died at in Switzerland at Oberhofen in November 1934.
