= Francis Montresor =

English cricketer and British Indian Army officer

Personal information
- Full name: Welby Francis Montresor
- Born: 3 October 1849; Krishnanagar, Bengal Presidency, British India
- Died: 27 January 1909 (aged 59); Kensington, London, England
- Batting: Unknown

Domestic team information
- Years: Team
- 1880: Marylebone Cricket Club

Career statistics
Competition	First-class
Matches	2
Runs scored	22
Batting average	5.50
100s/50s	–/–
Top score	7
Catches/stumpings	–/–
- Source: Cricinfo, 16 August 2021

Welby Francis Montresor (3 October 1849 — 27 January 1909) was an English first-class cricketer and an officer in both the British Army and the British Indian Army.

The son of Charles Francis Montresor, he was born in British India at Krishnanagar in October 1849. He was commissioned into the 10th Royal Hussars as a sub-lieutenant in October 1872, with promotion to lieutenant following in September 1875, antedated to October 1873. He was transferred to the Bengal Staff Corps in British India in April 1878, where he was assigned to the 17th Bengal Cavalry. In England in 1880, Montresor played two first-class cricket matches for the Marylebone Cricket Club against Hampshire at Lord's and Southampton. He scored 22 runs in these matches, with a highest score of 7. Returning to British India, he was promoted to captain in January 1885, with promotion to major in October 1893. Montresor retired from active service in February 1897. He died in January 1909, at his residence at 25 West Cromwell Road in Kensington. His grandfather was Sir Henry Montresor, a general in the British Army.
