= George Meares (cricketer) =

Welsh cricketer and British Army officer

Personal information
- Full name: George Brooke Meares
- Born: 9 January 1838; Glandyfi, Cardiganshire, Wales
- Died: 21 August 1894 (aged 56); Twickenham, Middlesex, England
- Batting: Right-handed
- Bowling: Unknown

Domestic team information
- Years: Team
- 1876: Marylebone Cricket Club

Career statistics
Competition	First-class
Matches	4
Runs scored	52
Batting average	8.66
100s/50s	–/–
Top score	23
Balls bowled	278
Wickets	7
Bowling average	23.28
5 wickets in innings	–
10 wickets in match	–
Best bowling	4/18
Catches/stumpings	5/–
- Source: Cricinfo, 25 September 2021

George Brooke Meares (26 October 1841 – 21 August 1894) was a Welsh first-class cricketer and British Army officer.

The son of George Meares and Louisa Maria Jeffreys, he was born at Glandyfi Castle in Cardiganshire in October 1841. Meares was commissioned into the British Army when he purchased the rank of ensign in the Royal Fusiliers in June 1859. He later purchased the rank of lieutenant in December 1863, with Meares being appointed an instructor of musketry in May 1868. His posting as an instructor of musketry came to an end in July 1872, when he was promoted to captain. Meares appeared in first-class cricket for the Gentlemen of the Marylebone Cricket Club against Kent in the Canterbury Cricket Week of 1874. He appeared in the same fixture in 1875 and 1876, in addition to making one first-class appearance for the Marylebone Cricket Club at Lord's in 1876. He scored 52 runs in his four first-class appearances, with a highest score of 23. As a bowler he took 7 wickets with best figures of 4 for 18.

Meares was seconded for service as an adjutant in the Volunteer Force with the 1st Administrative Battalion Tower Hamlets in December 1879. In July 1881, he was promoted to major, before being promoted to lieutenant colonel in 1886. A final promotion to colonel came in December 1889, Having been placed on the half-pay list, Meares was appointed a commandant at the Royal Military School of Music in October 1893. During his military career, he had seen action in British India in the North-West Frontier. Meares died at Twickenham in August 1894, following a battle with throat cancer. His was buried with full military honours.
