= Herbert Curteis (cricketer, born 1849) =

English cricketer

Personal information
- Full name: Herbert Curteis
- Born: 14 April 1849; Hailsham, Sussex, England
- Died: 28 October 1919 (aged 70); Hailsham, Sussex, England
- Batting: Right-handed
- Bowling: Right-arm roundarm medium
- Relatives: Herbert Curteis (father); Robert Curteis (brother)

Domestic team information
- Years: Team
- 1874–1880: Marylebone Cricket Club
- 1873: Sussex

Career statistics
| Competition | First-class |
|---|---|
| Matches | 4 |
| Runs scored | 48 |
| Batting average | 9.60 |
| 100s/50s | –/– |
| Top score | 25 |
| Balls bowled | – |
| Wickets | – |
| Bowling average | – |
| 5 wickets in innings | – |
| 10 wickets in match | – |
| Best bowling | – |
| Catches/stumpings | –/– |
- Source: Cricinfo, 14 July 2012

Herbert Curteis (14 April 1849 – 28 October 1919) was an English cricketer. Curteis was a right-handed batsman who bowled right-arm roundarm medium pace. He was born at Hailsham, Sussex, and was educated at Westminster School.

Curteis made his first-class debut for Sussex against Kent in 1873 at Ashford, Eastbourne. In his only innings, he scored 25 runs before he was dismissed by Bob Lipscomb, with Sussex winning by an innings and 104 runs. He later made three first-class appearances for the Marylebone Cricket Club, twice against Oxford University in 1874 and against Hampshire in 1880. In his three first-class matches for the Marylebone Cricket Club, he scored a total of 23 runs at an average of 5.75, with a high score of 12.

He died at the town of his birth on 28 October 1919. His father, also called Herbert, played first-class cricket, as did his brother Robert.
