= Dudley Pontifex =

English cricketer

Personal information
- Full name: Dudley David Pontifex
- Born: 12 February 1855; Weston, Bath, Somerset, England
- Died: 27 September 1934 (aged 79); West Dulwich, London, England
- Batting: Right-handed
- Role: Batsman

Domestic team information
- Years: Team
- 1881: Surrey
- 1882: Somerset
- 1883–1896: MCC
- FC debut: 3 June 1878 Gentlemen of England v Oxford University
- Last FC: 19 May 1896 MCC v Essex

Career statistics
Competition	First-class
Matches	17
Runs scored	357
Batting average	13.73
100s/50s	0/1
Top score	89
Balls bowled	13
Wickets	0
Bowling average	–
5 wickets in innings	–
10 wickets in match	–
Best bowling	–
Catches/stumpings	3/–
- Source: CricketArchive, 11 July 2011

Dudley David Pontifex (12 February 1855 – 27 September 1934) was an English cricketer who played first-class cricket for Surrey, Somerset and the Marylebone Cricket Club, plus other amateur sides, between 1878 and 1896. He was born at Weston, Bath, Somerset, and died at West Dulwich, London.

Pontifex was a right-handed middle-order or opening batsman. Educated in Bath, he appeared in a freshmen's trial match at Cambridge University but failed to make the first team; he did, however, win a Blue for billiards.

Appearing in minor cricket for amateur sides in Somerset and for Somerset County Cricket Club in non-first-class matches from 1877, Pontifex made his first-class cricket debut in 1878 against Oxford University for a Gentlemen of England side, and was successful neither in that nor in the South v North match that followed. After university, Pontifex moved to London to qualify as a lawyer and in 1881 he appeared fairly regularly in first-class matches for Surrey. In the match against Nottinghamshire at The Oval, he opened the batting and scored 89; this was his only score of more than 50 in first-class cricket. This was his only season of regular cricket. In 1882, he made a single first-class appearance in Somerset's debut season as a first-class team. He then played for MCC irregularly, and only very occasionally in first-class matches, over the next 14 seasons until his final first-class match in 1896.

His obituary in The Times in 1934 stated that after the age of 45 he took up golf and "became a scratch player"; he was also known as a real tennis and billiards player.
