= Charles Showers =

English cricketer

Personal information
- Full name: Charles James Showers
- Born: 12 January 1848; Fort William, Bengal Presidency, British India
- Died: Unknown
- Batting: Right-handed
- Bowling: Right-arm roundarm medium

Domestic team information
- Years: Team
- 1881: Marylebone Cricket Club

Career statistics
Competition	First-class
Matches	3
Runs scored	82
Batting average	16.40
100s/50s	–/–
Top score	39
Balls bowled	164
Wickets	1
Bowling average	48.00
5 wickets in innings	–
10 wickets in match	–
Best bowling	1/48
Catches/stumpings	–/–
- Source: ESPNcricinfo, 23 August 2019

Charles James Showers (12 January 1848 – date of death unknown) was an English first-class cricketer.

The son of Major–General St George Daniel Showers, he was born in January 1848 at Fort William in British India. He was educated in England at Cheltenham College and Wellington College. He made his debut in first-class cricket for the South in the North v South fixture of 1877 at Hull. Four years later, he made two further first-class appearances for the Marylebone Cricket Club against Kent and Hampshire, with both matches played at Lord's. He later became a tea planter in Assam.
