= Herbert Littlewood =

English cricketer and solicitor

Personal information
- Full name: Herbert Dell Littlewood
- Born: 18 December 1858; Islington, Middlesex, England
- Died: 31 December 1925 (aged 67); Ramsgate, Kent, England
- Batting: Right-handed

Domestic team information
- Years: Team
- 1887–1896: Marylebone Cricket Club

Career statistics
Competition	First-class
Matches	5
Runs scored	86
Batting average	9.55
100s/50s	–/–
Top score	35
Catches/stumpings	1/–
- Source: Cricinfo, 10 August 2021

Herbert Dell Littlewood (18 December 1858 – 31 December 1925) was an English first-class cricketer and solicitor.

The son of William Dell Littlewood, he was born at Islington in December 1858. A solicitor by profession, Littlewood made five appearances in first-class cricket for the Marylebone Cricket Club between 1887 and 1896, scoring 86 runs with a highest score of 35. He changed his name to Herbert Dell Littlewood-Clarke in September 1894. Littlewood died at Ramsgate on New Year's Eve in 1925.
