= Harry Stedman =

English cricketer and clergyman

Personal information
- Full name: Harry Charles Plumer Stedman
- Born: 11 October 1848; Great Budworth, Cheshire, England
- Died: 30 July 1904 (aged 55); Leire, Leicestershire, England
- Batting: Right-handed
- Bowling: Right-arm roundarm fast

Domestic team information
- Years: Team
- 1871: Marylebone Cricket Club
- 1871: Cambridge University

Career statistics
Competition	First-class
Matches	4
Runs scored	98
Batting average	14.00
100s/50s	–/–
Top score	22
Catches/stumpings	2/–
- Source: Cricinfo, 26 January 2023

Harry Charles Plumer Stedman, sometimes called Henry, (11 October 1848 – 30 July 1904) was an English clergyman and cricketer who played in four first-class cricket matches for Cambridge University and the Marylebone Cricket Club (MCC) in 1871. He was born at Great Budworth, Cheshire and died at Leire, Leicestershire.

Stedman was educated at St John's College, Cambridge. As a cricketer, he was a right-handed middle-order batsman and a right-arm fast bowler, though he did not bowl in first-class cricket. He played in a lot of minor matches for Cheshire and for other amateur teams before arriving in the Cambridge University eleven in 1871; his first university game was for the MCC against the university side, but he subsequently played in three matches for Cambridge, including the 1871 University Match against Oxford University in which he scored 1 not out and 22. The innings of 22 was his highest, and he did not appear in first-class cricket again, though he continued to play in less important matches for the next 20 years, including some games for Leicestershire, not then a first-class side.

Stedman graduated from Cambridge University with a Bachelor of Arts degree in 1872; this was converted to a Master of Arts in 1879. He was ordained as a deacon in the Church of England in 1872 and as a priest two years later. He served as a curate at churches in Liverpool and at Flitton, Bedfordshire to 1882 when he became rector of Leire in Leicestershire, where he remained until his death.
