= Percy Amherst =

English cricketer (1839–1910)

Personal information
- Full name: Percy Amherst
- Born: 30 November 1839; Montreal Park, England
- Died: 30 January 1910 (aged 70); Ossington, England

Domestic team information
- Years: Team
- 1871: MCC

Career statistics
Competition	First-class
Matches	1
Runs scored	2
Batting average	1
100s/50s	0/0
Top score	2
Catches/stumpings	0/–
- Source: CricketArchive, 9 August 2008

Percy Amherst (30 November 1839 – 30 January 1910) was an English first-class cricketer who played all his only game for Marylebone Cricket Club. His highest score of 2 came when playing for the Marylebone Cricket Club in the match against Cambridge University Cricket Club.
