= Arthur Kemp (Kent cricketer) =

English cricketer

Arthur Fitch Kemp (1 August 1863 – 14 February 1940) was an English cricketer who played first-class cricket in the mid-1880s for Kent, the Marylebone Cricket Club and other amateur teams. He was born at Forest Hill, London and died at his home at Wentworth, Virginia Water, Surrey.

Kemp was educated at Harrow School where he was captain of the cricket team in 1881. He appeared in one of the four first-class matches played by the Orleans Club at Twickenham, the game against Cambridge University in 1883; he then played three times for Kent in 1884 and once for MCC against Kent in 1885. Kemp also won the public schools rackets championship in 1881.

Two of his brothers, Charles and Manley, also played first-class cricket for Kent, and they both played for Oxford University too.

== Bibliography ==
- Carlaw, Derek (2020). Kent County Cricketers, A to Z: Part One (1806–1914) (PDF). Cardiff: ACS.
