= Herbert Mascall Curteis =

English cricketer

Herbert Mascall Curteis (8 January 1823 – 16 June 1895) was an English cricketer active from 1841 to 1860 who played for Sussex. He appeared in 57 first-class matches as a righthanded batsman who bowled slow roundarm. Career data is incomplete but he accounted for 560 runs with a highest score of 29 and took eleven wickets with a best performance of three in one innings. Two of his sons, Herbert and Robert, also played for Sussex.

Curteis was born in Florence, Italy, the only son of Herbert Barrett Curteis who was touring Italy with his wife at the time. He was educated at Westminster School and Christ Church, Oxford. His father was member of parliament for Rye, Sussex, from 1841 until 1847 when he died leaving 'large landed estates' to Herbert Mascall Curteis, who succeeded him in the representation of Rye and served until the next general election in 1852. He died at his house, Windmill Hill Place, near Hailsham, Sussex.

Parliament of the United Kingdom
Preceded by Herbert Barrett Curteis	Member of Parliament for Rye; 1847 – 1852	Succeeded by William Alexander Mackinnon
