= Ralph Pemberton =

English cricketer

Personal information
- Full name: Ralph Hylton Pemberton
- Born: 17 July 1864; Sunderland, County Durham, England
- Died: 11 January 1931 (aged 66); Lurgashall, Sussex, England
- Batting: Right-handed

Domestic team information
- Years: Team
- 1885: Oxford University

Career statistics
Competition	First-class
Matches	3
Runs scored	65
Batting average	13.00
100s/50s	–/–
Top score	40
Catches/stumpings	–/–
- Source: Cricinfo, 23 March 2020

Ralph Hylton Pemberton (17 July 1864 – 11 January 1931) was an English first-class cricketer.

The son of Richard Laurence Pemberton, he was born in July 1864 at Sunderland. He was educated at Eton College, before going up to New College, Oxford. While studying at Oxford, he played first-class cricket for Oxford University in 1885, making three appearances. He scored 65 runs in his three appearances, with a high score of 40. He was later employed as a bursar by Eton College. Pemberton died in January 1931 at Lurgashall, Sussex.
