= Roger Miller (cricketer, born 1857) =

English cricketer

Personal information
- Full name: Roger Miller
- Born: 20 April 1857; Reading, Berkshire, England
- Died: 13 July 1912 (aged 55); Lowestoft, Suffolk, England
- Batting: Right-handed
- Bowling: Right-arm medium

Domestic team information
- Years: Team
- 1881: Cambridge University
- 1881–1884: Marylebone Cricket Club

Career statistics
Competition	First-class
Matches	7
Runs scored	261
Batting average	23.72
100s/50s	–/1
Top score	73
Balls bowled	68
Wickets	0
Bowling average	–
5 wickets in innings	–
10 wickets in match	–
Best bowling	–
Catches/stumpings	2/–
- Source: Cricinfo, 30 April 2021

Roger Miller (20 April 1857 – 13 July 1912) was an English first-class cricketer.

The son of William Miller, he was born at Reading in April 1857. He was educated at both Somerset College in Bath and Uppingham School, before going up to Jesus College, Cambridge. While studying at Cambridge, he played first-class cricket for Cambridge University Cricket Club in 1881, playing two matches against an England XI and the Gentlemen of England, with both matches played at Fenner's. He scored 62 runs in these two matches, but did not gain a cricket blue. Miller also played first-class matches for the Marylebone Cricket Club between 1881 and 1884, making five appearances. He scored 199 runs in these matches, with a highest score of 73 on his debut for the club in 1881 against Cambridge University. Miller died at Lowestoft in July 1912.
