= Frederick Hotham =

English cricketer

Frederick William Hotham (17 January 1844 – 23 June 1908) was an English cricketer. He played first-class cricket in two matches, one in each of the 1882 and 1883 seasons. He was born at Bath, Somerset and died at Cricket Malherbie, also in Somerset.

Hotham was a right-handed lower-order batsman. Nearly all of his cricket was played for Marylebone Cricket Club (MCC) or Hertfordshire and was not first-class. But in 1882 and 1883 he played without success in the MCC first-class matches against Somerset at Lord's, in 1882 turning out for Somerset, for which he was qualified by birth, but in 1883 playing against Somerset for the MCC side. He was pretty even-handed in his lack of success for the two teams, making 10 runs in two innings for Somerset and eight runs (plus a catch) for MCC.
