= Henry Meek =

English cricketer and brewer

Personal information
- Full name: Henry Edgar Meek
- Born: 8 October 1857; Devizes, Wiltshire, England
- Died: 23 June 1920 (aged 62); Gullane, East Lothian, Scotland
- Batting: Right-handed

Domestic team information
- Years: Team
- 1878: Marylebone Cricket Club

Career statistics
Competition	First-class
Matches	1
Runs scored	0
Batting average	0.00
100s/50s	–/–
Top score	0
Catches/stumpings	–/–
- Source: Cricinfo, 12 October 2021

Henry Edgar Meek (8 October 1857 — 23 June 1920) was an English first-class cricketer and brewer.

The son of Alexander Meek, he was born at Devizes in October 1857. He was educated at Harrow School, where he was a noted sportsman who played for the cricket and football teams, in addition to winning the Public Schools' Rackets competition in 1876 with Lewis Jarvis. As a cricketer at Harrow, he was described by Wisden as "one of the hardest hitters ever turned out by Harrow, a good fast bowler and an excellent field at mid-off". A year after captaining the Harrow cricket team, Meek made a single first-class appearance for the Marylebone Cricket Club (MCC) against Sussex at Lord's in 1878. His only foray into first-class cricket ended in disappointment, with Meek being dismissed in the MCC's only innings for 0 by Richard Fillery. Away from sport, he was by profession a brewer and was President of the Devizes Chamber of Commerce in 1908. Meek died in Scotland in June 1920 at Gullane, East Lothian.
