= Henry Armitstead =

English cricketer

Sydney Henry Armitstead (13 June 1837 – 29 January 1912) was an English cricketer, an alumnus of Charterhouse School whose cricketing career including two first-class matches: for the Gentlemen of the North in 1862 and the Marylebone Cricket Club in 1864. A founding member of the Free Foresters Cricket Club, he played there between 1858 and 1872, and also played for Herefordshire and Cheshire. A round-arm bowler of unknown handedness and often a wicketkeeper, he was born in Holmes Chapel in Cheshire, and died in Llandegfan, Anglesey, Wales.

Armistead was a member of a cricketing family: his brother William played first-class cricket, while brothers John and Robert, and nephew William, all played school cricket. While schooling at Charterhouse he played cricket for three years, captaining the senior team, in 1855. Fred Lillywhite remarked of him that "His thorough knowledge of the game enabled him to fill most ably the office of captain. His batting throughout the season was excellent. His style is good, and he possesses great freedom in hitting all round. His bowling throughout the season was well up to the mark. Perhaps a little more steadiness in his batting would improve his scores."
