= Lewis Jarvis =

English banker and all-around athlete

Lewis Kerrison Jarvis (3 August 1857 – 16 May 1938) was an English all-round athlete who won Cambridge Blues for cricket, athletics and soccer, and later became a banker. He was born at King's Lynn, Norfolk and died at Kensington, London.

== Sporting career ==
The second son of banker Sir Lewis Whincop Jarvis and the former Emma Bowker, Jarvis was educated at Harrow School and Trinity College, Cambridge. His older brother, Alexander Weston Jarvis, was member of parliament for King's Lynn from 1886 to 1892.

At school he was in both the football and cricket teams and in 1876 he won the public schools racquets championship with Henry Meek.

At Cambridge, he played cricket for the university side from 1877 to 1879 and appeared in the University Match against Oxford University in all three seasons, though his contribution in each match was limited. A right-handed middle-order batsman and an occasional slow underarm bowler, he was most successful in his first season, when he averaged 25 with the bat and made his top score of 47. He scored 28 in the innings victory in 1878 of the Cambridge team over the Australians. He made a single appearance for Marylebone Cricket Club in 1879 and played two final first-class games for amateur sides in the 1880s.

As an athlete, he won Blues for the hurdles in 1878, 1879 and 1880 and he also represented Cambridge in the annual association football match against Oxford University in 1879.

== Career outside sport ==
After leaving Cambridge, Jarvis joined the family banking company, Jarvis & Jarvis of King's Lynn; this was taken over by Gurney & Co and that in turn became part of the Barclays Bank group in 1896. He worked in the discount market in the City of London. In the First World War, he served as a major in the 3rd County of London Yeomanry, and was involved in fighting in Egypt and Palestine. His only child, a son, also called Lewis, was killed during the First World War.
