= William Mackeson =

English cricketer and British Army officer (1856–1925)

Personal information
- Full name: William James Mackeson
- Born: 7 December 1856; Kensington, Middlesex, England
- Died: 21 July 1925 (aged 68); Atcham, Shropshire, England
- Batting: Unknown

Domestic team information
- Years: Team
- 1883: Marylebone Cricket Club

Career statistics
Competition	First-class
Matches	1
Runs scored	8
Batting average	4.00
100s/50s	–/–
Top score	7
Catches/stumpings	–/–
- Source: Cricinfo, 30 August 2021

William James Mackeson (7 December 1856 — 21 July 1925) was an English first-class cricketer and British Army officer.

Mackeson was born at Kensington in December 1856. He was educated at Harrow School, before going up to the Royal Military College, Sandhurst. He graduated from there into the British Army as an unattached sub-lieutenant in September 1875. Shortly after he was attached to the 5th Dragoon Guards, later being promoted to lieutenant in September 1877. He played first-class cricket for the Marylebone Cricket Club (MCC) against Derbyshire at Derby in 1883. Batting twice in the match, he was dismissed for a single run in the MCC first innings by Sydney Evershed, while in their second innings he was dismissed for 7 runs by James Brelsford.

In the Dragoon Guards, Mackeson was promoted to captain in the same year. Mackeson served in the Nile Expedition of 1884–5, which formed part of the wider Mahdist War, for which he was decorated with the Egypt Medal and the Khedive's Star. He retired from active service in September 1895, holding the rank of major. Following his retirement, Mackeson was placed on the Reserve of Officers. He was recalled to active service in the Second Boer War and was placed in command of the 3rd Provisional Regiment of Dragoons in April 1901, with the temporary rank of lieutenant colonel. He gained the full rank of lieutenant colonel in October 1901. Mackson was present at several battles during the war, for which he was mentioned in dispatches and on one occasion was seriously wounded. For his service in the war he was decorated with the Queen's South Africa Medal. He was later the secretary of the Shropshire branch of the Territorial Force Association. Mackeson died in July 1925 at Atcham, Shropshire.
