= George Dodsworth =

English cricketer and British Army officer

Personal information
- Full name: George Norsworthy
- Born: 2 December 1841; York, Yorkshire, England
- Died: 14 June 1876 (aged 34); Gwalior, Central Provinces, British India
- Batting: Left-handed

Domestic team information
- Years: Team
- 1868: Marylebone Cricket Club

Career statistics
Competition	First-class
Matches	1
Runs scored	5
Batting average	5.00
100s/50s	–/–
Top score	3
Catches/stumpings	–/–
- Source: Cricinfo, 27 August 2021

George Edward Dodsworth (2 December 1841 – 14 June 1876) was an English first-class cricketer and British Army officer.

The son of Benjamin Dodsworth, he was born at York in December 1841. He was educated at Repton School, before attending the Royal Military Academy, Woolwich. He graduated from Woolwich in December 1864, entering into the Royal Artillery as a lieutenant. Dodsworth played first-class cricket for the Marylebone Cricket Club (MCC) in 1868, against Lancashire at Lord's. Batting twice in the match, Dodsworth was dismissed for 3 runs in the MCC first innings by Frederick Reynolds, while in their second innings he was at the crease unbeaten on 2 runs when the winnings runs for the MCC were hit. He later served in British India with the Royal Artillery, where he died from fever in June 1876 at the British cantonment of Morar at Gwalior. He was survived by his wife, Penelope Ruth Wilford.
