= Francis Shadwell =

English cricketer (1851–1915)

Francis Bradby Shadwell (4 May 1851 – 9 February 1915) was an English first-class cricketer active 1879–82 who played for Surrey and Marylebone Cricket Club (MCC). He was born in Barnes, Surrey; died in Windsor.
