= Montague Stow =

English cricketer

Personal information
- Full name: Montague Haslam Stow
- Born: 21 July 1847; Whinmoor, Yorkshire, England
- Died: 7 September 1911 (aged 64); Monifieth, Angus, Scotland
- Batting: Right-handed
- Role: Wicket-keeper

Domestic team information
- Years: Team
- 1867: Marylebone Cricket Club
- 1867–1869: Cambridge University

Career statistics
Competition	First-class
Matches	16
Runs scored	303
Batting average	13.17
100s/50s	–/–
Top score	41
Catches/stumpings	18/1
- Source: Cricinfo, 26 January 2023

Montague Haslam Stow (21 July 1847 – 7 September 1911) was an English cricketer who played in 16 first-class cricket matches for Cambridge University, the Marylebone Cricket Club (MCC) and other amateur sides between 1867 and 1871. He was born at Whinmoor, Leeds, Yorkshire and died at Monifieth, Angus, Scotland.

Stow was educated at Harrow School and Trinity College, Cambridge. As a cricketer, he was a right-handed middle-order batsman and an occasional wicketkeeper, and although his record appears modest by modern standards, he was an integral part of the Cambridge team for three seasons from 1867 to 1869, and was captain in his final year. In all three seasons he won a Blue by appearing in the University Match against Oxford University, and as captain he led his team to victory in the 1869 game. After he left Cambridge University he played in only one further first-class match, a game between two "Gentlemen" sides in 1871.

Stow graduated from Cambridge with a Bachelor of Arts degree in 1870, which was converted to a Master of Arts in 1873. He qualified as a solicitor in 1873 and was a partner in the firm of Stow, Preston and Lyttelton in Lincoln's Inn Fields in London.
