= William Hood (cricketer) =

English cricketer and Royal Navy officer

Personal information
- Full name: William Nelson Hood
- Born: 6 January 1848; Westminster, Middlesex, England
- Died: 25 October 1921 (aged 73); Fulham, London, England
- Batting: Unknown

Domestic team information
- Years: Team
- 1875–1880: Marylebone Cricket Club

Career statistics
Competition	First-class
Matches	2
Runs scored	13
Batting average	3.25
100s/50s	–/–
Top score	6
Catches/stumpings	–/–
- Source: Cricinfo, 8 August 2021

William Nelson Hood (6 January 1848 – 25 October 1921) was an English first-class cricketer and Royal Navy officer.

The son of Alexander Hood, 1st Viscount Bridport and Lady Penelope Hill, he was born at Westminster in January 1848. He served in the Royal Navy as a lieutenant, prior to being placed on the retired list in October 1873. Hood made two appearances in first-class cricket for the Marylebone Cricket Club, playing against Oxford University at Oxford in 1875 and Kent at Lord's in 1880. Hood died at Fulham in October 1921.
