= Harry Pickett =

English cricketer (1862–1907)

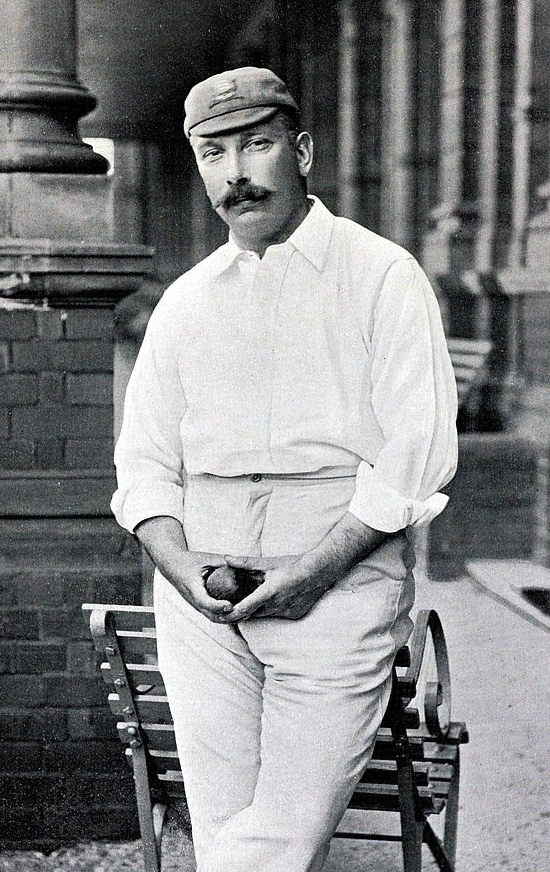
- Pickett pictured in about 1895

Personal information
- Born: 16 March 1862; Stratford, Essex, England
- Died: 3 October 1907 (aged 45); Aberavon, Glamorgan, Wales
- Batting: Right-handed
- Bowling: Right-arm fast

Domestic team information
- Years: Team
- 1884–1898: MCC
- 1894–1897: Essex

Career statistics
Competition	First-class
Matches	62
Runs scored	450
Batting average	8.03
100s/50s	0/0
Top score	35
Balls bowled	7,271
Wickets	134
Bowling average	24.39
5 wickets in innings	4
10 wickets in match	1
Best bowling	10/32
Catches/stumpings	25/–
- Source: CricketArchive, 14 July 2012

Henry Pickett (26 March 1862 – 3 October 1907) was an English cricketer who represented Essex for 17 years although only the last four were at first-class level. A fast bowler he was 'powerfully built' and 'bowled with a high arm'. His most significant performance came in 1895 when he took all ten Leicestershire wickets for 32 runs. These are the best innings figures recorded by an Essex bowler, the fourth best in the County Championship, and the ninth best in first-class cricket.

Born in Stratford, Pickett first played for Essex in 1881 but it would be 13 years before the county was awarded first-class status. In the intervening period he did make several first-class appearances for the Marylebone Cricket Club (MCC), the first in 1884 against Sussex. He played in Essex's first ever first-class match in 1894 but struggled in that first season taking 11 wickets at an average of 31.09. The following season, Essex's first season in the County Championship, was more successful. He took 66 wickets, at 17.72, including the 10/32 against Leicestershire as well as five-fors in wins against Somerset and Hampshire. Over the next two seasons he took 50 wickets at around 30. He didn't play again for Essex following his benefit season in 1897, he played one match for the MCC in 1898 before two seasons of umpiring. Following the end of his playing career he also coached at Clifton College.

Pickett disappeared on 27 September 1907 and a week later was found washed ashore on Aberavon beach. His death is listed as suicide.
