= Theophilus Greatorex =

English cricketer and priest

The Rev. Theophilus Greatorex in 1899

Theophilus Greatorex (14 December 1864 – 27 July 1933) was an English priest and first-class cricketer active 1883–92 who played for Middlesex.

Greatorex was born in Westminster, London, and educated at Harrow, where he played cricket for the school, and Trinity College, Cambridge, where he played for the university but did not get a blue. After graduating he became a Church of England priest and was already a minor canon of Westminster Abbey when he was in September 1902 asked to become vicar of St James the Less, Pimlico, where he served until 1908. He then moved to Western Australia and was rector of Pinjarra 1908–18, of Guildford 1918–23 and of Subiaco 1924–26. He returned to London and was again vicar of St James the Less briefly until he died in Pimlico.
