= William Higgins (English cricketer) =

English cricketer

Personal information
- Born: 12 December 1850; Westminster, London, England
- Died: 8 April 1926 (aged 75); Chelsea, London, England
- Source: ESPNcricinfo, 14 May 2016

William Higgins (12 December 1850 – 8 April 1926) was an English cricketer. He played six first-class matches for Marylebone Cricket Club between 1870 and 1873.
