= Herbert Gardner (cricketer) =

English cricketer and solicitor

Personal information
- Full name: Herbert Wilson Gardner
- Born: 19 January 1852; Rugeley, Staffordshire, England
- Died: 5 December 1924 (aged 72); Armitage, Staffordshire, England
- Batting: Right-handed

Domestic team information
- Years: Team
- 1882: Marylebone Cricket Club

Career statistics
Competition	First-class
Matches	1
Runs scored	2
Batting average	1.00
100s/50s	–/–
Top score	1
Catches/stumpings	–/–
- Source: Cricinfo, 11 September 2021

Herbert Wilson Gardner (15 January 1852 — 5 December 1924) was an English first-class cricketer and solicitor.

The son of James Gardner, he was born at Rugeley in January 1852. He was educated at Rugby School, where he played for the school cricket team and was coached by Alfred Diver. He was described by Wisden during his time at Rugby as a batsman who "hit well and scored fast, and was a very good field at cover-point". He also played rackets for the school, winning the Public Schools Rackets Challenge Cup in 1870 alongside Thomas Pearson. After completing his education, Gardner was admitted as a solicitor in 1876 and practiced in Rugeley. He later played first-class cricket for the Marylebone Cricket Club (MCC) against Oxford University at Oxford in 1882. Batting twice in the match, he was dismissed for a single run in the MCC first innings by Edward Shaw, while in their second innings he was run out for the same score. Besides playing first-class cricket, Gardner also played minor matches for Staffordshire until 1895, but did not feature in any of their eight matches in their debut season in the Minor Counties Championship. He was an elected member of the Lichfield Rural District Council. Gardner died in December 1924 at Armitage, Staffordshire.
