= George Vanderspar =

English cricketer

Personal information
- Full name: George Augustus Hunter Vanderspar
- Born: 22 October 1858; Galle, Southern Province, Ceylon
- Died: 23 May 1940 (aged 81); Bournemouth, Hampshire, England
- Batting: Right-handed
- Bowling: Right-arm underarm fast-medium

Domestic team information
- Years: Team
- 1893: Marylebone Cricket Club

Career statistics
Competition	First-class
Matches	1
Runs scored	7
Batting average	7.00
100s/50s	–/–
Top score	7
Balls bowled	–
Wickets	–
Bowling average	–
5 wickets in innings	–
10 wickets in match	–
Best bowling	–
Catches/stumpings	–/–
- Source: Cricinfo, 20 July 2014

George Augustus Hunter Vanderspar (22 October 1858 – 23 May 1940) was an English cricketer. Born at Galle in British Ceylon, Vanderspar was a right-handed batsman and a right-arm fast-medium underarm bowler.

He made one appearance in first-class cricket for the Marylebone Cricket Club (MCC) against Kent in 1893 at Lord's. He batted once in the match, scoring 7 runs in the MCC's first-innings, before he was dismissed by Alec Hearne. The match ended in a victory for the MCC by an innings and 21 runs.

He died at Bournemouth, Hampshire on 23 May 1940.
