= Walter Phipps (cricketer) =

English cricketer

Personal information
- Full name: Walter Tudway Phipps
- Born: 8 August 1845; Shepton Mallet, Somerset, England
- Died: 28 April 1902 (aged 56); Shanghai, China
- Batting: Right-handed
- Bowling: Right-arm underarm fast

Career statistics
Competition	First-class
Matches	2
Runs scored	44
Batting average	22.00
100s/50s	–/–
Top score	30
Catches/stumpings	1/–
- Source: Cricinfo, 26 February 2020

Walter Tudway Phipps (8 August 1845 – 28 April 1902) was an English first-class cricketer and merchant.

The son of Arthur Constantine Phipps, he was born in August 1845 at Shepton Mallet. He was educated at Harrow School, before going up to Christ Church, Oxford. Phipps made two appearances in first-class cricket for Southgate in 1868 and 1869, with both matches coming against Oxford University in 1864 at Oxford. He scored 44 runs in his two matches, with a high score of 30. Despite studying law and being a student of Lincoln's Inn in 1868, Phipps never became a practising barrister. Instead, he became a merchant in China, where he died at Shanghai in April 1902.
