= Charles Hough (cricketer) =

English cricketer and physician

Personal information
- Full name: Charles Henry Hough
- Born: 15 March 1855; Cambridge, Cambridgeshire, England
- Died: 15 October 1933 (aged 78); Manchester, Lancashire, England
- Batting: Unknown

Domestic team information
- Years: Team
- 1883: Marylebone Cricket Club

Career statistics
| Competition | First-class |
|---|---|
| Matches | 1 |
| Runs scored | 12 |
| Batting average | 12.00 |
| 100s/50s | –/– |
| Top score | 10 |
| Catches/stumpings | –/– |
- Source: Cricinfo, 26 September 2021

Charles Henry Hough (14 March 1855 — 15 October 1933) was an English first-class cricketer and physician.

The son of the physician Thomas Hough, he was born at Cambridge in March 1855. He was educated at Uppingham School, before going up to St Thomas's Hospital Medical School. After qualifying, he was appointed house-surgeon at the Derbyshire Royal Infirmary. He would remain practicing in Derby for 25 years, becoming a well respected consultant. A keen cricketer, Hough played county cricket for Cheshire in minor matches. He featured in one first-class cricket match for the Marylebone Cricket Club (MCC) in 1883, against Derbyshire at Derby. Batting twice from the tail, he was dismissed in the MCC first innings by Sydney Evershed, while in the MCC second innings he was not out on 2.

Hough became president of the Midland branch of the British Medical Association (BMA) in 1903, retiring in the same year to a house he had built for himself at the foot of Loughrigg Fell in the Lake District. He did not retire fully however, and continued to maintain a rural medical practice. During the First World War, his friend Oswald Hedley offered his historic manor, Calgarth Park, as a hospital for wounded Belgian soldiers. Hough was invited by Hedley to organise its transformation. In 1916, he oversaw the outfitting of the manor to serve as an orthopedic hospital for British officers. The hospital remained following the war and became an orthopedic hospital for disabled children, with Hough assisting with its administration well into his formative years. The BMA honoured Hough in April 1933, by conferring the diploma of F.R.C.S on him. He died in a Manchester nursing home following a brief illness in October 1933.
