= Frederick Steele (cricketer) =

English cricketer

Frederick Steele (14 May 1847 – 22 January 1915) was an English cricketer who played for Middlesex County Cricket Club and MCC between 1877 and 1880.

Steele was born at Hackney in London in 1847. He made his first-class cricket debut for Middlesex in 1877 and played a total of 10 times for the county side. He also played twice in first-class matches for MCC and once for The South. Steele was a fast bowler. He took 43 wickets in his 13 first-class matches but was described in his Wisden obituary as "no batsman"; he scored just 33 first-class runs, with a batting average of just 1.65 runs per innings. He played regularly for MCC as a bowler in non first-class matches as well as for a number of other sides.

Steele died at Hackney in 1915 aged 67.
