= George Howitt =

English cricketer

George Howitt (14 March 1843 – 19 December 1881) was an English first-class cricketer active 1865–76 who played for Middlesex and Nottinghamshire. He was born in Dunkirk, Nottingham and died in Nottingham. He played in 79 first-class matches as a lefthanded batsman, scoring 483 runs with a highest score of 49; and as a left-arm roundarm fast bowler, taking 348 wickets with a best performance of seven for 19. He was a cousin of England Test batsman William Scotton.
