= William Marten =

English cricketer

Personal information
- Full name: William George Marten
- Born: 5 September 1845; Tunbridge Wells, Kent
- Died: 25 November 1907 (aged 62); Stoke Newington, London
- Batting: Right-handed
- Bowling: Right-arm fast

Domestic team information
- Years: Team
- 1865–1871: Kent
- 1871–1872: Surrey
- FC debut: 6 July 1865 Kent v Surrey
- Last FC: 22 August 1872 Surrey v Kent

Career statistics
Competition	First-class
Matches	45
Runs scored	312
Batting average	5.47
100s/50s	0/0
Top score	27*
Balls bowled	6,401
Wickets	114
Bowling average	22.30
5 wickets in innings	4
10 wickets in match	2
Best bowling	6/11
Catches/stumpings	27/–
- Source: CricInfo, 17 December 2018

William George Marten (5 September 1845 – 25 November 1907) was an English professional cricketer who played in 45 first-class cricket matches between 1865 and 1872.

Marten was born at Tunbridge Wells in Kent in 1845. He made his first-class debut for Kent County Cricket Club in 1865 before going on to play 15 times for the county between then and 1871. In 1871, he joined Surrey, playing 24 times for the team until 1872. Marten was a professional bowler on the Marylebone Cricket Club (MCC) ground staff at Lord's. He played for MCC teams between 1867 and 1871, including making three first-class appearances for the club, and played minor cricket for a wide variety of teams, including for Essex teams before the county had first-class status.

One of Marten's matches for Surrey in 1872 saw the match completed in one day after the opponents, MCC, were bowled out for 16 runs in their first innings. Marten took six wickets for 11 runs in the MCC's first innings, his career best bowling figures, but failed to take a wicket in his 21 four-ball overs in the second innings.

Marten stood as an umpire in one first-class match in 1882. He died at Stoke Newington in London in November 1907, aged 62.

== Bibliography ==
- Carlaw, Derek (2020). Kent County Cricketers, A to Z: Part One (1806–1914) (PDF). Cardiff: ACS.
