= Lionel Booth (cricketer) =

English cricketer and British Army officer

Personal information
- Full name: Lionel Edward Blakeney Booth
- Born: 21 December 1850; Marylebone, Middlesex, England
- Died: 9 July 1912 (aged 61); Chillerton, Isle of Wight, England
- Batting: Unknown

Domestic team information
- Years: Team
- 1885: Marylebone Cricket Club

Career statistics
Competition	First-class
Matches	1
Runs scored	8
Batting average	8.00
100s/50s	–/–
Top score	8
Catches/stumpings	1/–
- Source: Cricinfo, 14 October 2021

Lionel Edward Blakeney Booth (21 December 1850 - 9 July 1912) was an English first-class cricketer and British Army officer.

The son of Lionel Booth, he was born at Marylebone in December 1850. He was educated at Wellington College, Berkshire. After leaving Wellington, he was commissioned into the 104th Regiment of Foot as a sub-lieutenant in January 1872. He was promoted to lieutenant in January 1872, which was antedated to the date of his commission. Booth transferred to the Duke of Wellington's Regiment in July 1875, at which point he was made a captain. He served in the Second Anglo-Afghan War, with Booth being promoted to brevet major in September 1882, in recognition of his service during the conflict. He played first-class cricket for the Marylebone Cricket Club in 1885, making a single appearance against Hampshire at Southampton. Batting once in the match, he was dismissed for 8 runs in Hampshire's first innings by H. H. Armstrong.

As his military career continued, Booth was seconded for service on the staff in August 1889, being appointed aide-de-camp to Major-General Sir T. D. Baker in British India. His promotion from brevet major to major came in August 1890, with promotion to lieutenant colonel following in December 1898. He was placed in command of the 16th Regimental Division of the Bedfordshire Regiment in October 1902, with Booth being made a colonel upon his appointment. He retained this command until October 1906, after which he retired from active service in December 1907. He died at Billingham Manor on the Isle of Wight in July 1912.
