= Sidney Wilson (cricketer) =

English cricketer, broker and soldier

Personal information
- Full name: Sidney John Wilson
- Born: 22 September 1858; Paddington, Middlesex, England
- Died: 1 February 1917 (aged 58); Flushing, Cornwall, England
- Batting: Right-handed
- Bowling: Right-arm medium
- Relatives: Alfred Wilson (father)

Domestic team information
- Years: Team
- 1882: Marylebone Cricket Club

Career statistics
Competition	First-class
Matches	1
Runs scored	8
Batting average	4.00
100s/50s	–/–
Top score	6
Balls bowled	8
Wickets	0
Bowling average	–
5 wickets in innings	–
10 wickets in match	–
Best bowling	–
Catches/stumpings	–/–
- Source: Cricinfo, 15 June 2021

Sidney John Wilson (22 September 1858 – 1 February 1917) was an English first-class cricketer, broker and British Army officer.

The son of the cricketer and barrister Alfred Wilson, he was born in September 1858 at Paddington. He was educated at Winchester College. Wilson made a single appearance in first-class cricket for the Marylebone Cricket Club (MCC) against Somerset at Lord's in 1882. He batted twice in the match, making 6 runs in the MCC first innings before being dismissed by Charles Winter, while in their second innings he was dismissed for 2 runs by Arnold Fothergill. He also bowled two wicketless overs with his right-arm medium pace bowling. Wilson served as a volunteer in the Queen's Own Royal West Kent Regiment, holding the rank of captain in April 1885. By profession he was a colonial produce broker at Mincing Lane in City of London. He died in February 1917 at Flushing, Cornwall.
