= Henry Richardson (cricketer, born 1846) =

English businessman and cricketer

Henry Adair Richardson (31 July 1846 – 17 September 1921) was an English businessman and a cricketer who played first-class cricket for Cambridge University, Kent, Middlesex and the Gentlemen between 1866 and 1871. He was born in Bayswater, London and died at Hastings, East Sussex.

Richardson was educated at Tonbridge School and at Trinity College, Cambridge, from where he graduated with a Bachelor of Arts degree in 1869. He later received a Master of Arts degree from the same college in March 1900.

A right-handed middle-order batsman, occasional wicketkeeper and even more occasional bowler of unknown style, he played first-team cricket for his school from the age of 15. At Cambridge in 1866, however, he played in only one first-class match. But when the university season was over, he appeared in five matches for Kent, and scored 50 in the second innings of his first game for the county, against Sussex. He improved on that with an innings of 92 in a return match later in the season.

In the three seasons from 1867 to 1869, Richardson played regularly for the Cambridge first team and in the first two of these years was successful as a batsman; he played in all three years in the University Match against Oxford University. From 1868 he also started keeping wicket for Cambridge in occasional games and he retained that position in the 1869 season, though he did not keep wicket for other teams. In the 1869 University Match, he made four stumpings and two catches, but he was unsuccessful with the bat in all of his games against Oxford. His best season with the bat was 1868 when he scored his only century, an innings of 143 for Cambridge University against Surrey at The Oval. In the same season he played against Surrey on two other occasions too, once each for Kent and Middlesex, and also appeared in two Gentlemen v Players games.

Richardson played no more first-class cricket after single matches in both 1870 and 1871. He went into business in Mumbai, then called Bombay, and was later chairman of the Anglo-Egyptian Bank and cited as an expert on trade in Egypt.

== Bibliography ==
- Carlaw, Derek (2020). Kent County Cricketers, A to Z: Part One (1806–1914) (PDF). Cardiff: ACS.
