= Ashford Road =

Cricket ground in Eastbourne, England

Coordinates: 50.77179°N 0.28697°E

Ground information
- Location: Eastbourne, Sussex
- Establishment: 1866 (first recorded match)

Team information
Sussex	(1867 & 1873)
Eastbourne	(1857 - 1879)
- As of 28 August 2010; Source: Ground profile

Ashford Road was a cricket ground in Eastbourne, Sussex. The first recorded match on the ground was in 1857, when Eastbourne played a United All-England Eleven. Sussex played Kent in the grounds first first-class match. The second and final first-class match held at the ground was played in 1873 and was between Sussex and Kent. The final recorded match held on the ground came in 1879 when the Eastbourne played E Christian's XI. The site is today occupied by buildings.
