= Frederick Maude (cricketer) =

English cricketer (1857–1923)

Frederick William Maude (28 February 1857 – 9 February 1923) was an English first-class cricketer active 1883–97 who played for Middlesex and Marylebone Cricket Club (MCC). He was born in Plumstead; died in St Pancras, London.
