= List of Kent County Cricket Club players =

This is a list of cricketers who have played for Kent County Cricket Club in top-class matches. The county club has its origin in the Kent Club founded at Canterbury on 6 August 1842. A similar organisation was formed at Maidstone in 1859 and, in 1870, these two amalgamated to create the present county club. Like the Kent county teams formed by earlier organisations, including the old Town Malling club, the county club has always been classified as a top-class team. The players listed have played for the club in first-class, List A or Twenty20 cricket matches.

The details are the player's usual name followed by the years in which he was active as a Kent player. Note that many players represented other teams besides Kent. Current players are shown as active to the latest year in which they played for the club. The list excludes Second XI and other players who did not play for the club's first team. Players who represented the county before August 1842 are included only if they also played for the county club after its initial formation.

As of 24 August 2025

== A ==
- Charlie Absolom (1868–1879)
- Kristian Adams (2000)
- Tom Adams (1836–1858)
- Wes Agar (2023–2025)
- John Aitchison (1949–1950)
- Ian Akers-Douglas (1929–1938)
- Toby Albert (2023)
- Terry Alderman (1984–1986)
- Charles Alexander (1864)
- Charles Alexander (1867–1869)
- Jimmy Allan (1954–1957)
- Hartley Alleyne (1988–1989)
- Cyril Alliston (1922)
- Les Ames (1926–1951)
- Henry Andrews (1852–1863)
- Geoffrey Anson (1947)
- Arafat Bhuiyan (2023–2024) (Note: Arafat, who was born in Bangladesh in 1996 but hold UK residency allowing him to play as a domestic player, joined Kent in May 2023 having previously played for the county's Second XI. A seam bowler, he was educated in London and was a member of the South Asian Cricket Academy, an initiative to encourage more British players of South Asian origin to become professional cricketers.)
- Reginald Arbuthnot (1881–1890)
- Robert Armstrong (1859–1861)
- Arshdeep Singh (2023)
- Bill Ashdown (1920–1937)
- Arthur Ashwell (1933–1934)
- Asif Iqbal (1968–1982)
- Derek Aslett (1981–1987)
- Frederick Atkins (1882–1897)
- Geoffrey Austin (1861–1868)
- Azhar Mahmood (2008–2012)

== B ==
- Ronald Bailey (1948)
- Reginald Baiss (1895–1901)
- David Baker (1961–1963)
- Edward Baker (1875)
- George Baker (1859–1863)
- Herbert Baker (1903–1904)
- Percy Baker (1900–1902)
- William Baker (1858)
- William de Chair Baker (1841–1854)
- David Balcombe (2011)
- Adam Ball (2010–2017)
- Jake Ball (2025)
- Malinga Bandara (2010)
- Matthew Banes (1999–2003)
- Edward Banks (1842–1846)
- William Banks (1846–1848)
- Bernard Bannon (1895–1900)
- Eldine Baptiste (1981–1987)
- Henry Barber (1861–1864)
- Keith Barlow (1910)
- Amos Bartholomew (1858–1864)
- Xavier Bartlett (2024)
- Victor Barton (1889–1890)
- Harry Bass (1871–1875)
- Emilius Bayley (1842–1844)
- Lyttleton Bayley (1846–1847)
- James Bazley (2023)
- Thomas Beeching (1920–1921)
- Daniel Bell-Drummond (2011–2025)
- Charles Belton (1847)
- Chris Benjamin (2025)
- Ferdinando Bennet (1874)
- Farmer Bennett (1853–1873)
- Robert Bennett (1863–1864)
- William Bennett (1844)
- Mark Benson (1980–1995)
- Hugh Bernard (2016–2017)
- George Beslee (1925–1930)
- William Best (1890–1892)
- Morton Betts (1872–1881)
- Michael Bevan (2004)
- John Bickley (1854)
- Eric Bickmore (1919–1929)
- Sam Billings (2011–2025)
- Albert Birch (1894)
- Jackson Bird (2022)
- Henry Biron (1857–1864)
- Arthur Blackman (1879–1880)
- George Blackmore (1948)
- Everard Blair (1893–1900)
- Alex Blake (2006–2023)
- Dick Blaker (1898–1908)
- Greg Blewett (2003)
- Edward Bligh (1849–1864)
- Henry Bligh (1854–1860)
- Ivo Bligh, 8th Earl of Darnley (1877–1883)
- Lodovick Bligh (1878–1884)
- John Bluett (1950)
- Arthur Blunden (1931–1933)
- Colin Blythe (1899–1914)
- Doug Bollinger (2014)
- Maurice Bonham Carter (1902)
- Stephen Botting (1867–1875)
- Herbert Bouch (1892)
- Sidney Boucher (1922)
- John Boys (1875–1881)
- Bill Bradley (1895–1903)
- Carlos Brathwaite (2018)
- Dwayne Bravo (2006)
- James Bray (1879–1882)
- Henry Braybrooke (1891–1899)
- Alan Brazier (1955–1956)
- Henry Brenchley (1854–1857)
- Thomas Brenchley (1849–1851)
- James Broad (1854)
- Alan Brown (1957–1970)
- Stevens Brown (1899)
- Franklin Browne (1899–1903)
- Godfrey Bryan (1920–1933)
- Jack Bryan (1919–1932)
- Ronnie Bryan (1920–1937)
- Bull (1871) (Note: Bull made a single appearance for the county in 1871, probably as a last minute replacement in a team described as "weak" and which lost by an innings. He batted at number 11 and bowled as Kent's fifth choice bowler without taking a wicket. Nothing further is known of his life and there are no biographical details other than his surname.)
- Charlie Bull (1929–1930)
- George Burke (1877)
- Cuthbert Burnup (1896–1907)
- John Burton (1862–1864)
- Ian Butler (2004)
- John Byass (1874–1876)

== C ==
- William Caffyn (1858)
- Iain Campbell (1946)
- William Candlett (1880)
- Jack Capes (1923–1928)
- Tom Caplen (1897)
- Stephen Capon (1950)
- Michael Carberry (2003–2005)
- Douglas Carr (1909–1914)
- James Carroll (1865–1869)
- William Carter (1845–1846)
- Sidney Castle (1890–1893)
- Tony Catt (1954–1964)
- Peter Cazalet (1927–1932)
- Arthur Ceely (1854)
- Yuzvendra Chahal (2023)
- Gerry Chalk (1933–1939)
- Dominic Chambers (2006)
- George Champion (1892)
- Percy Chapman (1924–1938)
- Thomas Cheesman (1854)
- John Christopherson (1931–1935)
- Percy Christopherson (1887)
- Stanley Christopherson (1883–1890)
- David Clark (1946–1951)
- William Clarke (1854)
- Mitchell Claydon (2013–2019)
- Francis Clifford (1849–1860)
- Lord Clifton (1871–1879)
- Grahame Clinton (1974–1978)
- Michael Cohen (2025)
- Colin Cole (1935–1938)
- Eric Cole (1938)
- George Coles (1873)
- Matt Coles (2007–2017)
- Benjamin Collins (1856)
- Christopher Collins (1881–1885)
- George Collins (1874–1882)
- George Collins (1911–1928)
- Ben Compton (2022–2025)
- William Constable (1876–1877)
- David Constant (1961–1963)
- Geoffrey Cook (1957)
- Simon Cook (2005–2012)
- Bransby Cooper (1868–1869)
- Charles Cooper (1894–1896)
- Sidney Cope (1924)
- Charles Coppinger (1870)
- Edward Coppinger (1873)
- William Coppinger (1868–1873)
- Stanley Cornwallis (1919–1926)
- William Court (1867)
- Chris Cowdrey (1976–1991)
- Colin Cowdrey (1950–1976)
- Fabian Cowdrey (2012–2016)
- Graham Cowdrey (1984–1998)
- Jordan Cox (2019–2023)
- Frank Crawford (1870–1879)
- John Crawford (1872–1877)
- Tom Crawford (1930–1951)
- Aidan Crawley (1927–1947)
- Zak Crawley (2017–2025)
- Sydney Croft (1902)
- William Crowhurst (1877)
- Henry Croxford (1869–1877)
- Eddie Crush (1946–1949)
- Daryll Cullinan (2001)
- Barry Cumberlege (1923–1924)
- Miguel Cummins (2021)
- Charles Cunliffe (1877–1880)
- Edward Curteis (1877)
- Olly Curtiss (2025) (Note: Curtiss, who was born at Ashford in 2006, made his Kent debut in August 2025 during the 2025 One-Day Cup after signing a month-long contract to play for the team during the competition. After playing age-group cricket for Kent, he made his Second XI debut for the county in 2022 and played for England Young Lions in 2025. Educated at Kent College in Canterbury, he played club cricket for St Lawrence and Highland Court in the Kent Cricket League.)
- Simon Cusden (2004–2006)

== D ==
- Arthur Daffen (1890–1891)
- Chris Dale (1986)
- John Dale (1958)
- Bruce Darvell (1952)
- Jack Davies (1934–1951)
- Mark Davies (2012–2013)
- Ryan Davies (2015)
- Percy Davis (1946)
- Richard Davis (1986–1993)
- John Davison (1860–1863)
- Charles Davy (1892)
- Ben Dawkins (2025) (Note: Born in South Africa in 2006, Dawkins was educated at Sevenoaks School and played age-group cricket for Kent. A wicket-keeper, he made his Kent Second XI debut in 2023, and played for the England under-19 team in 2024 and 2025. He signed a professional contract with the county in July 2025, and made his first-class debut for the team at the end of the same month.)
- Arthur Day (1905–1925)
- Sammy Day (1897–1919)
- Sydney Day (1922–1925)
- Jason de la Peña (1998)
- Robert de Lasaux (1858)
- Aravinda de Silva (1995)
- Fanie de Villiers (1990)
- Alec Debnam (1948–1949)
- Jack Deed (1924–1930)
- Jaydn Denly (2023–2025) (Note: Denly, who was born at Margate in 2006, made his debut during Kent's 2023 One-Day Cup campaign aged 17. A left-handed all-rounder, he is the nephew of established Kent batsman Joe Denly.)
- Joe Denly (2004–2025)
- Lambert Denne (1860–1863)
- Mike Denness (1962–1976)
- Matthew Dennington (2003–2006)
- Neil Dexter (2005–2008)
- George Dickins (1849–1864)
- Sean Dickson (2015–2019)
- Graham Dilley (1977–1986)
- Ted Dillon (1900–1923)
- Hugh Dinwiddy (1933–1934)
- Brian Disbury (1954–1957)
- Paul Dixey (2005–2010)
- Alan Dixon (1950–1970)
- Mark Dobson (1989–1991)
- William Dorrinton (1834–1848)
- Ray Dovey (1938–1954)
- George Downton (1948)
- Paul Downton (1977–1979)
- William Draper (1874–1881)
- Rahul Dravid (2000)
- Clive Dring (1955)
- Eliot Druce (1898–1900)
- Arthur du Boulay (1899)
- Faf du Plessis (2019)
- Keith Dudgeon (2025)
- John Duke (1855)
- Frank Dutnall (1919–1920)
- William Dutnall (1923)
- Jacob Duffy (2022)
- John Dye (1962–1971)

== E ==
- Alan Ealham (1966–1982)
- Mark Ealham (1989–2003)
- Joseph Easby (1894–1899)
- Brian Edrich (1947–1953)
- Phil Edwards (2009–2010)
- William Edwards (1884)
- Alfred Elcome (1862)
- George Elliott (1874)
- Richard Ellison (1981–1994)
- Richard Elms (1970–1976)
- Godfrey Evans (1939–1967)
- John Evans (1921–1928)
- Joey Evison (2022–2025)

== F ==
- Arthur Fagg (1932–1957)
- Frederick Fagge (1834–1851)
- Bill Fairservice (1902–1921)
- Colin Fairservice (1929–1933)
- Paul Farbrace (1987–1989)
- Leslie Fawcus (1924)
- Nicholas Felix (1834–1852)
- James Fellowes (1873–1881)
- George Fenner (1925–1927)
- Maurice Fenner (1951–1954)
- Rob Ferley (2003–2010)
- George Field (1856–1859)
- Arthur Fielder (1900–1914)
- Ted Fillary (1963–1966)
- Frederick Finch (1862)
- Harry Finch (2021–2025) (Note: Made his debut for the team following a member of the county’s First XI squad testing positive for COVID-19 which required the players involved in the county’s previous match to all self-isolate.)
- Ian Fleming (1934)
- Matthew Fleming (1988–2002)
- Corey Flintoff (2025)
- William Foord-Kelcey (1874–1883)
- Jamie Ford (1996)
- Geoffrey Foster (1921–1922)
- Jack Foster (1930)
- James Foster (1880–1881)
- Peter Foster (1939–1946)
- Charles Fox (1888–1893)
- Frederick Foy (1937–1938)
- Tich Freeman (1914–1936)
- Douglas Freeman (1937)
- Lovick Friend (1886–1887)
- Harry Fryer (1852–1872)
- Arthur Fulcher (1878–1887)
- Eric Fulcher (1919)
- David Fulton (1992–2006)

== G ==
- Frederick Gale (1845)
- George Garrett (2024–2025)
- Ben Geddes (2023)
- Walter George (1875)
- Arthur Gibson (1883–1884)
- Will Gidman (2016–2018)
- Nathan Gilchrist (2020–2025)
- Alfred Gillow (1860)
- James Golding (1999–2002)
- George Goldsmith (1875)
- Steve Goldsmith (1986–1987)
- Billy Goodhew (1854–1866)
- James Goodman (2007–2011)
- Joe Gordon (2021)
- John Gosling (1858)
- WG Grace (1877)
- Norman Graham (1963–1977)
- James Graham-Brown (1974–1976)
- William Green (1856–1861)
- Edward Greenwood (1873)
- David Griffiths (2014–2016)
- James Grimshaw (1934)
- Tim Groenewald (2020)
- Brian Gunn (1946)
- John Guy (1938)

== H ==
- Calum Haggett (2013–2020)
- David Halfyard (1956–1964)
- Andrew Hall (2005–2007)
- Cyril Hamilton (1935)
- Leonard Hamilton (1890–1892)
- Hamidullah Qadri (2020–2024)
- William Hammond (1857)
- Edward Hardcastle (1883–1884)
- Norman Harding (1937–1947)
- Edmund Hardinge (1861)
- Wally Hardinge (1902–1933)
- Charles Harenc (1834–1848)
- William Hargreaves (1893)
- Herbert Harington (1897)
- Mark Harman (1988–1989)
- Ben Harmison (2012–2015)
- Lord Harris (1870–1911)
- James Harris (2017–2019)
- Thomas Harris (1864)
- Philip Harrison (1904–1905)
- Charlie Hartley (2014–2017)
- Frederick Hassan (1879)
- Thomas Hassell (1847)
- Eric Hatfeild (1910–1914)
- Henry Hayman (1873)
- Robert Haywood (1878)
- Dean Headley (1992–1999)
- Peter Hearn (1947–1956)
- Sid Hearn (1922–1926)
- Alec Hearne (1884–1906)
- Frank Hearne (1879–1889)
- George Hearne (1875–1895)
- Herbert Hearne (1884–1886)
- Walter Hearne (1887–1896)
- Lionel Hedges (1919–1924)
- Coote Hedley (1888)
- Leon Hellmuth (1951–1952)
- Tyron Henderson (2006)
- Matt Henry (2018–2022)
- Edward Henty (1865–1881)
- Allen Herbert (1874)
- Steven Herzberg (1995)
- Harold Hever (1921–1925)
- Jamie Hewitt (2002–2003)
- John Hibbard (1893)
- Edward Hickmott (1875–1888)
- William Hickmott (1914–1921)
- Alan Hilder (1924–1929)
- Richard Hills (1973–1980)
- Charles Hillyer (1868)
- William Hillyer (1834–1853)
- Philip Hilton (1865–1873)
- Trevitt Hine-Haycock (1885–1886)
- Edmund Hinkly (1846–1858)
- Simon Hinks (1982–1991)
- Arthur Hoare (1871)
- Charles Hoare (1872)
- James Hockley (1998–2010)
- Richard Hodgson (1871–1874)
- Michael Hogan (2023)
- Frederick Hollands (1849–1859)
- Lewis Hollingworth (1845–1846)
- Charles Hooman (1910)
- Andrew Hooper (1966–1969)
- Carl Hooper (1992–1998)
- Elliot Hooper (2021)
- William Hopkinson (1861–1863)
- Alfred Hoppe (1854)
- Thomas Hopper (1856) (Note: Hopper played in one match for Kent. There is some doubt about the identity of the man who played in the match, although modern researchers agree it was most likely to have been Hopper.)
- Gerald Hough (1919–1920)
- Harry Houillon (2021)
- Will House (1996–1999)
- Charles Howard (1844)
- James Howgego (1977)
- Chris Howland (1965)
- Bernard Howlett (1922–1928)
- George Hubbard (1895)
- Harold Hubble (1929–1931)
- Jack Hubble (1904–1929)
- Francis Huish (1895)
- Fred Huish (1895–1914)
- Punter Humphreys (1899–1920)
- Matt Hunn (2013–2018)
- Frederick Hunt (1897–1898)
- Charles Hunter (1895)
- Christopher Hurst (1908–1927)
- Frederick Hutchings (1901–1905)
- Kenneth Hutchings (1902–1912)
- William Hutchings (1899)

== I ==
- Alan Igglesden (1986–1998)
- James Iles (2006–2008)
- Imran Qayyum (2016–2020)
- Alfred Inglis (1887)
- John Inglis (1883)
- Isaac Ingram (1878–1879)
- Frederick Schomberg Ireland (1878–1887)
- Leonard Irvine (1927)

== J ==
- Callum Jackson (2016)
- John Jackson (1858)
- William James (1881) (Note: James played once for a Kent Colts team at Mote Park in 1881 before making his only first-class appearance in a match against MCC at Lord's the same year. Other than that he was born at Canterbury in 1858, there is no biographical information available about him.)
- Kevin Jarvis (1975–1987)
- David Jennings (1909–1914)
- Graham Johnson (1965–1985)
- C. P. Johnstone (1919–1933)
- Alfred Jones (1847) (Note: Jones played twice for Kent in 1847, on both occasions against Surrey. He is believed to have been from Canterbury, but no biographical information, other than his name, is known.)
- Geraint Jones (2001–2013)
- Kevin Jones (2005)
- Peter Jones (1953–1967)
- Richard Jones (1877–1886)
- Steffan Jones (2009)
- Akeem Jordan (2024)
- Tony Jose (1951–1952)
- Robbie Joseph (2001–2014)
- Bernard Julien (1970–1977)

== K ==
- Kashif Ali (2025)
- George Keeble (1876)
- Harry Keeling (1893)
- Danny Kelleher (1987–1991)
- George Kelson (1859–1873)
- Arthur Kemp (1884)
- Charles Kemp (1878)
- Justin Kemp (2005–2009)
- Manley Kemp (1880–1895)
- Nick Kemp (1977–1981)
- Graham Kersey (1991–1992)
- Rob Key (1998–2015)
- Amjad Khan (2001–2010)
- Feroze Khushi (2024)
- George Kibble (1889)
- Percy Kidd (1874)
- Simon Kimmins (1950–1951)
- Frederick King (1871)
- James King (1881)
- Henry Bloomfield Kingscote (1867)
- Fred Klaassen (2019–2025)
- Henry Knatchbull (1827–1848)
- Cecil Knatchbull-Hugessen (1884)
- William Knatchbull-Hugessen (1859)
- Brook Knight (1844)
- Wyndham William Knight (1862)
- Alan Knott (1964–1985)
- Freddie Knott (1910–1914)
- John Knott (1921–1939)
- Lance Knowles (1892–1903)
- Heino Kuhn (2018–2021)

== L ==
- David Lacy-Scott (1946)
- Charl Langeveldt (2011)
- John Larking (1946)
- Tom Latham (2016)
- Hervey Lawrence (1899)
- Mark Lawson (2010)
- David Laycock (1969–1973)
- Alfred Layman (1893)
- John Le Fleming (1889–1899)
- Lawrence Le Fleming (1897–1899)
- Edwin Leaney (1892)
- Jack Leaning (2020–2025)
- Stuart Leary (1951–1971)
- Fred Lee (1895)
- Warren Lee (2005–2009)
- John Lefeaver (1841–1854)
- Bill Leggatt (1926)
- Geoffrey Legge (1924–1931)
- Frederick Leney (1905)
- Herbert Leney (1873–1877)
- Hopper Levett (1930–1947)
- Claude Lewis (1933–1953)
- Dan Lincoln (2021)
- George Linde (2022–2023)
- William Lindsay (1931)
- Bob Lipscomb (1862–1873)
- Frank Lipscomb (1882–1884)
- Charles Little (1893)
- Robert Livesay (1895–1904)
- Nigel Llong (1989–1999)
- Bernard Lock (1952)
- James Logan (2021)
- Tom Longfield (1927–1939)
- Jonathan Longley (1989–1993)
- Alex Loudon (2002–2004)
- Richard Lowe (1926)
- Alfred Lubbock (1863–1875)
- Edgar Lubbock (1871)
- Nevile Lubbock (1860)
- Frederick Lucas (1954)
- Max Luckett (2022) (Note: Luckett made his debut in May 2022 in a first-class match against a Sri Lanka Development XI. He had previously played for Kent and Nottinghamshire Second XIs and for Loughborough UCCE.)
- Brian Luckhurst (1958–1985)

== M ==
- Frederick Mackenzie (1880)
- Francis MacKinnon (1875–1885)
- Calum MacLeod (2021)
- Kenneth McAlpine (1885–1886)
- Martin McCague (1991–2001)
- George McCanlis (1873–1881)
- William McCanlis (1862–1877)
- Conor McKerr (2022–2023)
- Ryan McLaren (2007–2009)
- Charles McVittie (1929)
- Ernest Malden (1893)
- Eustace Malden (1892–1893)
- Lasith Malinga (2007)
- Tony Mallett (1945–1953)
- Eric Mann (1902–1903)
- Frank Marchant (1883–1905)
- Charles Marriott (1924–1937)
- Steve Marsh (1982–2000)
- Anthony Marshall (1950–1954)
- Algernon Marsham (1946–1947)
- Cloudesley Marsham (1900–1922)
- Francis Marsham (1905)
- George Marsham (1876–1882)
- John Marsham (1873)
- William Marten (1865–1871)
- Edward Martin (1845–1851)
- Frederick Martin (1885–1899)
- George Martin (1856–1863)
- Jack Martin (1939–1953)
- Will Martingell (1841–1852)
- Jack Mason (1893–1914)
- James Mason (1900)
- David Masters (2000–2002)
- Kevin Masters (1983–1989)
- Dicky Mayes (1947–1953)
- Henry Mayne (1835–1844)
- Billy Mead (2022)
- William Meers (1866)
- Frank Mellor (1877–1878)
- James Melville (1962–1963)
- Tony Merrick (1990–1991)
- James Mewett (1860)
- Frederic Meyrick-Jones (1893–1896)
- Henry Milles (1888–1897)
- Richard Mills (1825–1843)
- Adam Milne (2017–2021)
- Matt Milnes (2019–2022)
- Robert Minns (1959–1963)
- Clement Mitchell (1890–1892)
- Thomas Mitchell (1925–1934)
- Walter Money (1867)
- Eustace Mordaunt (1896–1897)
- Gerald Mordaunt (1895–1897)
- Percy Morfee (1910–1912)
- Morné Morkel (2007)
- Norman Morris (1870–1872)
- Robert Morris (1950)
- William Morris (1896)
- Paul Muchall (2010)
- Wiaan Mulder (2019)
- Arthur Munds (1896)
- Raymond Munds (1902–1908)
- George Munsey (2021)
- Muttiah Muralitharan (2003)
- Bill Murray-Wood (1936–1953)
- Joe Murrell (1899–1905)
- Tawanda Muyeye (2021–2025)
- Alfred Mynn (1834–1859)
- Walter Mynn (1834–1848)

== N ==
- Mohammad Nabi (2019)
- Brendan Nash (2012–2015)
- Rex Neame (1956–1957)
- Jimmy Neesham (2017)
- Dewald Nel (2010–2011)
- Peter Nelson (1946)
- Scott Newman (2012)
- David Nicholls (1960–1980)
- Aron Nijjar (2023)
- Paul Nixon (2000–2002)
- Frederick Norley (1864–1865)
- James Norley (1870–1872)
- Charles Norman (1853)
- Frederick Norman (1858–1864)
- Percy Northcote (1889–1895)
- Sam Northeast (2007–2017)
- Bradbury Norton (1858–1866)
- Selby Norton (1863)
- William Norton (1853–1859)
- William South Norton (1849–1870)
- Makhaya Ntini (2010)
- Henry Nuttall (1889–1894)

== O ==
- Niall O'Brien (2004–2006)
- Alfie Ogborne (2024)
- Sid O'Linn (1951–1954)
- Mike Olton (1962–1963)
- Marcus O'Riordan (2019–2024)
- Edward O'Shaughnessy (1879–1885)
- Cuthbert Ottaway (1869–1870)

== P ==
- Colin Page (1950–1975)
- Richard Palmer (1873–1882)
- William Palmer (1867–1870)
- Elliot Parke (1874)
- Matt Parkinson (2023–2025)
- Bobby Parks (1993)
- Wayne Parnell (2009–2017)
- George Parr (1854–1858)
- Tom Parsons (2007)
- Min Patel (1989–2007)
- John Patterson (1881–1882)
- William Patterson (1880–1900)
- Walter Pattisson (1876–1887)
- Tom Pawley (1880–1887)
- Tony Pawson (1946–1953)
- Charles Payne (1863–1870)
- Joseph Payne (1864)
- Charlie Peach (1930–1931)
- Alec Pearce (1930–1946)
- William Pearce (1878)
- Herbert Peel (1851–1852)
- Chris Penn (1982–1994)
- Dick Penn (1875–1884)
- Frank Penn (1875–1881)
- Frank Penn (1904–1905)
- William Penn (1870–1878)
- John Pentecost (1882–1890)
- John Pepys (1859–1869)
- Thomas Perkins (1893–1900)
- Jack Pettiford (1954–1959)
- Toby Pettman (2022)
- Arthur Phebey (1946–1961)
- Vernon Philander (2013)
- Ben Phillips (1996–2000)
- John Phillips (1955)
- Walter Phillips (1903)
- Roy Pienaar (1987–1989)
- Chris Piesley (2010–2011)
- Fuller Pilch (1836–1854)
- William Pilch (1840–1854)
- John Pocock (1947–1949)
- Harry Podmore (2018–2022)
- Ian Potter (1959–1961)
- Joseph Potter (1871)
- Laurie Potter (1981–1985)
- Arthur Povey (1921–1922)
- Mike Powell (2012–2013)
- William Powell (1912–1921)
- Harold Prest (1909–1922)
- Henry Preston (1907–1913)
- Nick Preston (1996–1997)
- John Pretlove (1955–1959)
- Roger Prideaux (1960–1961)
- Tom Pritchard (1956)
- John Prodger (1956–1967)
- Barry Pryer (1947–1949)

== Q ==
- Qais Ahmad (2021–2022)
- Matt Quinn (2021–2025)

== R ==
- Kagiso Rabada (2016)
- Gordon Raikes (1948)
- William Rashleigh (1885–1901)
- Herbert Rawson (1873)
- Ollie Rayner (2019)
- Lionel Recordon (1927–1929)
- George Remnant (1868–1878)
- Henry Renny-Tailyour (1873–1883)
- Matt Renshaw (2019)
- James Reynolds (1890–1897)
- Jamal Richards (2025)
- Henry Richardson (1866–1868)
- Kane Richardson (2023)
- Peter Richardson (1959–1965)
- Fred Ridgway (1946–1961)
- Arthur Ridley (1877)
- Giles Ridley (1965)
- Adam Riley (2011–2019)
- Mohammed Rizvi (2025) (Note: Rizvi signed to play in the 2025 One-Day Cup having impressed playing as a leg-spinning all-rounder for the county's Second XI. Born in Pakistan and educated at Kingsbury High School, Park High School, and Oxford Brookes University, he played age-group cricket for Middlesex before making one first-class appearance for Oxford MCCU in 2019. He played Minor Counties cricket for Hertfordshire in 2021 and 2022, and Second XI cricket for Essex, Surrey, Kent, and Glamorgan. He made his Kent senior debut against Sussex in Kent's first match of the 2025 One-Day Cup.)
- Ollie Robinson (2017–2022)
- John Pickersgill Rodger (1870)
- William Rodger (1867–1873)
- Tom Rogers (2024–2025)
- Adam Rouse (2016–2019)
- Charles Rowe (1974–1981)
- Robert Rumsey (1875)

== S ==
- David Sabine (1988)
- Safyaan Sharif (2021)
- Martin Saggers (1999–2009)
- Navdeep Saini (2022)
- Neil Saker (2011)
- Mohammad Sami (2003–2004)
- Philip Sankey (1852)
- William Sarel (1912–1914)
- David Sayer (1955–1976)
- Darren Scott (1998–2000)
- Robert Sewell (1884)
- Tom Sewell (1852)
- Tom Sewell (1856–1866)
- James Seymour (1902–1926)
- Shahid Afridi (2004)
- Ashley Shaw (2010–2012)
- George Shaw (1872)
- John Shaw (1865–1866)
- Vero Shaw (1875–1878)
- Edward Sheffield (1933)
- Peter Shenton (1960)
- John Shepherd (1965–1981)
- Alamgir Sheriyar (2003–2005)
- Eustace Shine (1896–1899)
- Alan Shirreff (1950–1956)
- Charlie Shreck (2011–2013)
- John Shuter (1874–1875)
- Ernest Simpson (1896)
- Gerard Simpson (1929–1931)
- Ekansh Singh (2024–2025)
- Jas Singh (2021–2025)
- Kanwar Singh (1901–1902)
- Ed Smith (1996–2004)
- Geoff Smith (1951–1958)
- Stephen Smith (1855–1856)
- William Smith (1840–1857)
- William Smith-Masters (1875)
- Benjamin Smyth (1858)
- Shane Snater (2019)
- Arthur Snowden (1911)
- Edward Solbé (1921–1924)
- Frank Solbé (1891–1892)
- John Spanswick (1955–1956)
- Guy Spelman (1978–1982)
- Duncan Spencer (1993–1994)
- Tom Spencer (1935–1946)
- Hugh Spottiswoode (1890)
- Alfred Staines (1863–1864)
- Eddie Stanford (1995–1997)
- Edward Stanhope (1861)
- Darren Stevens (2005–2022)
- Grant Stewart (2017–2025)
- Haldane Stewart (1892–1903)
- David Stiff (2004–2006)
- Charlie Stobo (2024)
- Marcus Stoinis (2018)
- Frederic Stokes (1871–1875)
- Graham Stokes (1880–1881)
- Lennard Stokes (1877–1880)
- Paul Strang (1997)
- Richard Streatfeild (1856)
- Alexander Streatfeild-Moore (1885–1888)
- Francis Street (1875–1877)
- Peter Sunnucks (1934–1946)
- Henry Sutherland (1871)
- John Swaffer (1873)
- Beyers Swanepoel (2024)
- Edward Swann (1844–1845)
- Thomas Swinford (1874)
- Andrew Symonds (1999–2004)
- Anton Syrée (1879)

== T ==
- Edward Taswell (1860–1861)
- Chris Tavaré (1974–1988)
- Robert Tayler (1865)
- Horace Taylor (1922–1925)
- Howard Taylor (1937)
- Neil Taylor (1979–1995)
- Edward Taylor-Jones (1894)
- Robert Terry (1860)
- Frederick Theobold (1862)
- Ivan Thomas (2011–2020)
- Julian Thompson (1994–1999)
- Henry Thomson (1876)
- Albert Thornton (1884–1891)
- Charles Thornton (1867–1872)
- Richard Thornton (1881–1888)
- Ronald Thresher (1957)
- Viscount Throwley (1882–1884)
- Thomas Tidy (1868)
- Henry Tindall (1893–1895)
- Leslie Todd (1927–1950)
- William Tomson (1861–1872)
- John Tonge (1884–1897)
- Edward Tootell (1872)
- Peter Topley (1972–1975)
- William Torrens (1890)
- William Traill (1860–1866)
- James Tredwell (2001–2018)
- Peter Trego (2003)
- Ben Trott (2000–2004)
- Lionel Troughton (1907–1923)
- Medhurst Troughton (1864–1873)
- Carleton Tufnell (1878–1879)
- John Tufton (1897–1898)
- Andy Tutt (1992)
- James Tylden (1923)
- Edward Tylecote (1875–1883)

== U ==
- Derek Ufton (1945–1962)
- Derek Underwood (1963–1987)

== V ==
- Bryan Valentine (1927–1948)
- Martin van Jaarsveld (2005–2011)
- Alan Verrinder (1977)
- Hardus Viljoen (2016–2019)

== W ==
- Wahab Riaz (2011)
- Jack Walker (1949)
- Matt Walker (1992–2008)
- Conrad Wallroth (1872)
- Chris Walsh (1996–1998)
- James Walton (1875)
- Geoff Ward (1949)
- Trevor Ward (1986–1999)
- Frederick Warde (1871–1877)
- Stuart Waterton (1980–1985)
- Arthur Wathen (1863–1864)
- William Wathen (1863)
- George Watson (1928–1929)
- Alan Watt (1929–1939)
- James Watts (1859–1860)
- Steve Waugh (2002)
- Joe Weatherley (2017)
- George Webb (1880–1892)
- Robert Webb (1864) (Note: Webb played a single first-class match for Kent in 1864, playing in a match against Yorkshire which may not have been an official Kent match. There is some doubt about his identity, although he is believed to have been born at Maidstone in 1840 and is likely to be the player who appeared in Kent Colts matches and for Yalding.)
- Gerry Weigall (1891–1903)
- James Welldon (1867–1869)
- Alan Wells (1997–2000)
- Joseph Wells (1862–1863)
- Vince Wells (1987–1991)
- Ned Wenman (1825–1854)
- William Wenman (1854–1864)
- Edward White (1867–1875)
- Lionel White (1869)
- George Whitehead (1914)
- Peter Whitehouse (1937–1938)
- Charles Whittaker (1839–1847)
- Bailey Wightman (2021)
- George Wigzell (1852–1860)
- Bob Wilkinson (1959–1963)
- Edmund Willes (1852–1853)
- Alfred Williams (1865)
- Charles Willis (1849–1850)
- Simon Willis (1992–1999)
- Tom Wills (1855–1856)
- Edgar Willsher (1850–1875)
- William Willsher (1847)
- Erasmus Willson (1898)
- Bob Wilson (1952–1967)
- Cecil Wilson (1882–1890)
- Leslie Wilson (1883–1897)
- John Wisden (1854)
- Ted Witherden (1951–1955)
- George Wood (1919–1927)
- Harry Wood (1876–1882)
- Lindsay Wood (1981–1982)
- Tony Woollett (1950–1954)
- Frank Woolley (1906–1938)
- Bob Woolmer (1968–1984)
- Jimmy Wootton (1880–1890)
- Edward Wormald (1870)
- Charles Worthington (1898)
- Tim Wren (1989–1997)
- Charlie Wright (1921–1931)
- Doug Wright (1932–1957)
- Edward Wright (1902)
- Walter Wright (1888–1899)

== Y ==
- William Yardley (1868–1878)
- Yasir Arafat (2007–2008)
- Yasir Shah (2017)
- Alfred Young (1890)

== See also ==
- List of Kent County Cricket Club captains
- List of Gentlemen of Kent cricketers
- List of Kent county cricketers to 1842

== Bibliography ==
- Carlaw, Derek (2020a). Kent County Cricketers, A to Z: Part One (1806–1914) (PDF). Cardiff: ACS.
- Moore, Dudley (1998). The History of Kent County Cricket Club. London: Christopher Helm. ISBN 978-07-47022-09-1.
