= Byass =

Byass is a surname. Notable people with the surname include:

- John Byass (1854–1936), English cricketer
- Miles Byass (born 1991), American soccer player

== See also ==
- Byass baronets
- González Byass, Spanish winery
