= William Hammond =

William Hammond may refer to:

== Sports ==
- William Hammond (cyclist) (1886–?), British Olympic road racing cyclist
- William Hammond (fencer) (1872–?), British Olympic fencer at the 1920 and 1924 Olympics
- William Hammond (cricketer) (fl.1855–1868)

== Politicians ==
- William Hammond (died 1763), British Member of Parliament for Southwark
- William Hammond (died 1575), MP for Guildford

== Others ==
- William Hammond (died 1685) (c.1635–c.1685), Original Fellow of the Royal Society
- William Hammond (1707–1787), Danish landowner
- William Hammond (hymnist) (1719–1783), English hymnist
- William A. Hammond (1828–1900), neurologist, 11th US Army Surgeon General
- Bill Hammond (1947–2021), New Zealand artist
- William Hammond (ship), a barque used to transport convicts to Western Australia
- William Hammond (historian), American historian
- William Archie Hammond, founder of the W.A. Hammond Drierite Company
- William C. Hammond (born 1947), American novelist of historical fiction
- William Churchill Hammond (1860–1949), American organist and music educator
