= Howgego =

Howgego is a surname. Notable people with the surname include:

- Ben Howgego (born 1988), English cricketer
- Christopher Howgego, British numismatist and academic
- James Howgego (born 1948), English cricketer
