= William Best =

William Best may refer to:

- William Best (cricketer) (1865–1942), English cricketer
- William Thomas Best (1826–1897), English organist
- William Best, 1st Baron Wynford (1767–1845), British politician and judge
- William Best, 2nd Baron Wynford (1798–1869), British peer
- William Best (Nova Scotia politician) (1707–1782), Nova Scotia politician, one of the founders of Halifax
- William Best, composed the music for the song "(I Love You) For Sentimental Reasons"
- Willie Best (1916–1962), American television and film actor
- Will Best (born 1985), English television and radio presenter

== See also ==
- John William Best (1912–2000), British Royal Air Force pilot
