= Tootell =

Tootell is a surname. Notable people with the surname include:

- Edward Tootell (1849–1878), English cricketer
- Fred Tootell (1902–1964), American hammer thrower
- Hugh Tootell (1671/72 – 1743), English Roman Catholic historian

== See also ==
- Tootell House, a house in Kingston, Rhode Island, United States
