= Meers =

Meers may refer to:

== People ==
- Ernest George Meers (1848–1928), English tennis player
- Nelson Meers (born 1938), Australian lawyer and Lord Mayor of Sydney
- Nick Meers (born 1955), English photographer
- William Meers (1844–1902), English cricketer
- Kenneth Meers (1960–1992), American murder victim

== Other uses ==
- Meers, Oklahoma, U.S.
- Meers Brook, a stream in Sheffield, England
- Meers Fault, a fault in Oklahoma, U.S.
- Fuddy Meers, an American play by David Lindsay-Abaire

== See also ==
- Meer (disambiguation)
