= Ronald Bailey =

Ronald or Ron Bailey may refer to:

- Ron Bailey (rugby league) (1914–1989), Australian rugby league footballer
- Ronald A. Bailey (cricketer) (1923–1990), English cricketer
- Ron L. Bailey (New Zealand politician) (1926–2015)
- Ronald Bailey (writer) (born 1953), American libertarian writer
- Ronald W. Bailey (diplomat) (1917–2010), British diplomat
- Ronald L. Bailey, retired United States Marine Corps lieutenant general
- Ron E. Bailey (born 1943), British activist and parliamentary campaigner
