= Francis Street =

Francis Street may refer to:

- Francis Scott Street (1831–1883), co-owner of Street & Smith publishing company in New York City
- Francis Street (cricketer) (1851–1928), English cricketer
