= Mewett =

Mewett is a surname. Notable people with the surname include:

- Geri Mewett (born 1974), Bermudian swimmer
- James Mewett (1833–1904), English cricket player
- Noel Mewett (born 1949), Australian Australian rules football player

== See also ==
- Hewett (surname)
