= David Nicholls (cricketer) =

English cricketer (1943–2008)

Personal information
- Full name: David Nicholls
- Born: 8 December 1943; East Dereham, Norfolk
- Died: 10 June 2008 (aged 64); Dartford, Kent
- Batting: Left-handed
- Bowling: Right-arm off-spin
- Role: Opening batsman, wicketkeeper

Domestic team information
- Years: Team
- 1960–1980: Kent
- FC debut: 8 June 1960 Kent v Cambridge University
- Last FC: 8 July 1977 Kent v Surrey
- LA debut: 15 June 1969 Kent v Warwickshire
- Last LA: 7 September 1980 Kent v Yorkshire

Career statistics
Competition	First-class	List A
Matches	202	98
Runs scored	7,072	1,742
Batting average	22.23	20.73
100s/50s	2/34	0/6
Top score	211	64
Balls bowled	36	0
Wickets	2	–
Bowling average	11.50	–
5 wickets in innings	0	–
10 wickets in match	0	–
Best bowling	1/0	–
Catches/stumpings	325/13	75/11
- Source: CricInfo, 5 July 2008

David Nicholls (8 December 1943 – 10 June 2008), was an English cricketer who played for Kent County Cricket Club during the 1960s and 1970s. He was born at East Dereham in Norfolk and died at Dartford in Kent in 2008 aged 64.

Nicholls was a powerfully-built left-handed batsman, usually used as an opener, and a wicketkeeper. In both roles, he usually had to play second fiddle to Kent's established stars, being behind Peter Richardson, Brian Luckhurst, Mike Denness and Graham Johnson for most of his career as an opening batsman, and being deputy to Alan Knott as wicketkeeper. In an 18-season first-class cricket career, he played more than 200 matches for Kent, plus almost 100 List A games, but was a regular member of the side with a fixed place in the team for only a couple of years in the early 1970s. In one of those seasons, 1971, he completed exactly 1,000 first-class runs, the only time he passed this particular landmark.

== Early career ==
Nicholls made his first-class debut as a 16-year-old in 1960 but did not bat, bowl or keep wicket in his only game that season. He appeared next in 1962, playing nine first-class matches and making his first score of more than 50 – 76 against Nottinghamshire at Trent Bridge.

In 1963, the Kent side was in transition and captain Colin Cowdrey was injured for much of the season. Luckhurst and Denness took advantage of vacancies in the batting line-up to establish themselves in the side, but Nicholls was unable to do so: although he played in 16 first-class matches, he made only 684 runs at an average of just 25. He did, however, make the highest individual score of the whole English season, 211 against Derbyshire at Folkestone in 335 minutes. It remained the highest score of Nicholls' first-class career.

== Re-emergence ==
That career did not go forward much over the next few seasons. Nicholls remained a fringe first-team player, with his batting average drooping below 20. From 1967, however, he began to act as deputy wicketkeeper to Knott, and with Knott increasingly selected as England's wicketkeeper, Nicholls played fairly regularly from 1968 through to 1976. Wisden noted in 1969 that "he would prove even more useful if he could recover his batting form". In 1969, batting improvement came, and Nicholls played in several games where Knott was also playing: he scored 743 runs and his average rose to 23. He was also awarded his county cap.

Kent's County Championship-winning season of 1970 was not a success for Nicholls, but in 1971, with Luckhurst joining Knott as an England regular and Cowdrey ill for much of the season, he established himself as a regular opener as well as deputising as wicketkeeper. Wisden noted: "He was not merely to be regarded as the deputy wicket-keeper... Nicholls emerged as a highly successful opening batsman, scoring his runs quickly and in entertaining fashion, well-deserving to reach 1,000 for the first time in his career. He met with equal success either opening with Luckhurst or, in that batsman's absence on Test duty, with Denness." He finally added a second century to the double he had scored in 1963, making 135 against Lancashire at Southport.

== Later career ==
Nicholls remained a regular player in the 1972 season, but he failed to make 1,000 runs and his highest score was just 60. Wisden noted in both 1973 and 1974, however, that Kent had almost an embarrassment of batting talent at its disposal, and between 1972 and 1977, with the exception of the 1975 season, Nicholls' batting average was in the low 20s. It meant that though he commanded a place when he was acting as Knott's deputy, his appearances as a batsman-only became less frequent. He continued to contribute useful runs, but did not score any more centuries. In 1977, the emergence of Paul Downton as a new Kent wicketkeeper brought the end of Nicholls' first-class career, though he continued to play second eleven matches until 1980 and also reappeared in a few one-day matches in the 1980 season.

He then went on to work for the sports company Lillywhite Frowd based in Tonbridge.
