= John Pocock (cricketer) =

English cricketer

Personal information
- Full name: Howard John Pocock
- Born: 8 April 1921; Maidstone, Kent
- Died: 10 August 2003 (aged 82); Sutton Valence, Kent
- Batting: Right-handed

Domestic team information
- Years: Team
- 1947–1949: Kent
- Source: Cricinfo, 5 April 2014

Howard John Pocock (8 April 1921 – 10 August 2003) was an English amateur cricketer. He played for Kent County Cricket Club between 1947 and 1949.

Pocock was born at Maidstone in Kent in 1921 and was educated at Maidstone Grammar School. and was a member of The Mote cricket club in the town. He served in the Royal Army Service Corps of the British Army during World War II, reaching the rank of captain, and first played for Kent's Second XI in 1938, playing regularly in both that season and 1939. He made his full county debut following the war, playing seven first-class matches in 1946 and 1947. He scored a total of 118 runs and took one first-class wicket. His highest score of 34 was made against Yorkshire in 1947, part of a fourth-wicket partnership of 97 runs with Arthur Fagg on a difficult, rain-affected pitch.

He was unable to play regularly, but continued to play for the Second XI until 1952, and was later a member of the club's General Committee. He chaired the Committee between 1978 and 1985 and was President of the club in 1988. Pocock was Chairman of the Cricket Committee in 1976 when Mike Denness was controversially sacked as captain, and met with Denness as part of the process.

Pocock was also Club Chairman during the period of World Series Cricket, and at the start of the 1978 season told four leading players, Derek Underwood, Bob Woolmer, Alan Knott and Asif Iqbal that their contracts would not be renewed for 1979. The decision was later retracted, but led to conflict with the players involved. In 1982 Knott, Underwood and Woolmer were once again the subject of consideration by the Kent committee after touring South Africa with a rebel England team. Once again the players' contracts were almost cancelled, but the committee considered it too expensive to do so; Pocock spoke in favour of the trio continuing to play for Kent. He was also chairman when captain Graham Johnson left the club in 1985, but was influential in reinstating Asif Iqbal, who had been county captain before World Series Cricket, as Kent captain in 1981.

As a member of The Mote, Pocock was influential in Kent cricket circles. Another Chairman of Kent, Jim Woodhouse, described him as thinking that "he was god number two to Jim Swanton. Pocock was in business in Maidstone. died at Sutton Valence in Kent in 2003. He was aged 82.

== Bibliography ==
- Carlaw, Derek (2024). Kent County Cricketers, A to Z: Part Three (1946–1999) (PDF). Cardiff: ACS.
- Ellis, Clive; Pennell, Mark (2010). Trophies and Tribulations: Forty Years of Kent Cricket. London: Greenwich Publishing. ISBN 978-09-56408-10-5.
- Haigh, Gideon (2007). The Cricket War. Melbourne: Melbourne University Press. ISBN 978-05-22854-75-6.
- Moore, Dudley (1998). The History of Kent County Cricket Club. London: Christopher Helm. ISBN 978-07-47022-09-1.
