= Thomas Hopper (cricketer) =

English cricketer (1828–1877)

Thomas Hopper (1828 – 13 July 1877) was an English professional cricketer who played in one first-class cricket match for Kent County Cricket Club in 1856. (Note: There is some doubt about the identity of the man who played in this match.) He was christened at Gravesend in Kent on 1 February 1828.

Hopper played club cricket for Gravesend Cricket Club between 1848 and 1867, often opening the batting. He was the son of Thomas and Elizabeth Hopper and followed his father into the family business of providing poultry, running the business with his wife Sarah by 1861. Hopper died in London in July 1877 aged around 49.

He is believed to have made a single first-class appearance against Marylebone Cricket Club (MCC) at Lord's in 1856. There is some doubt about the identity of the man who played in this match and both the 1907 History of Kent County Cricket (Note: The 1988 edition of The History of Kent County Cricket Club identifies Hopper as the player involved.) and the 1929 Kent Cricket Matches 1719–1880 identify him as Mr J Hoppe, probably John Hoppe, the twin brother of Alfred Hoppe, (Note: Alfred Hoppe played once for Kent in 1854 and for the Gentlemen of Kent and Sussex in 1857 and played club cricket for Town Malling as well as other teams. John Hoppe is known to have played club cricket alongside his brother.) whilst Scores and Biographies identifies him as T Hoppe. More recent research has concluded that Hopper was probably the player involved and several prominent Gravesend cricketers, including Tom Adams, played in the same match.

== Bibliography ==
- Carlaw, Derek (2020). Kent County Cricketers, A to Z: Part One (1806–1914) (PDF). Cardiff: ACS.
