= Leslie Todd =

English cricketer

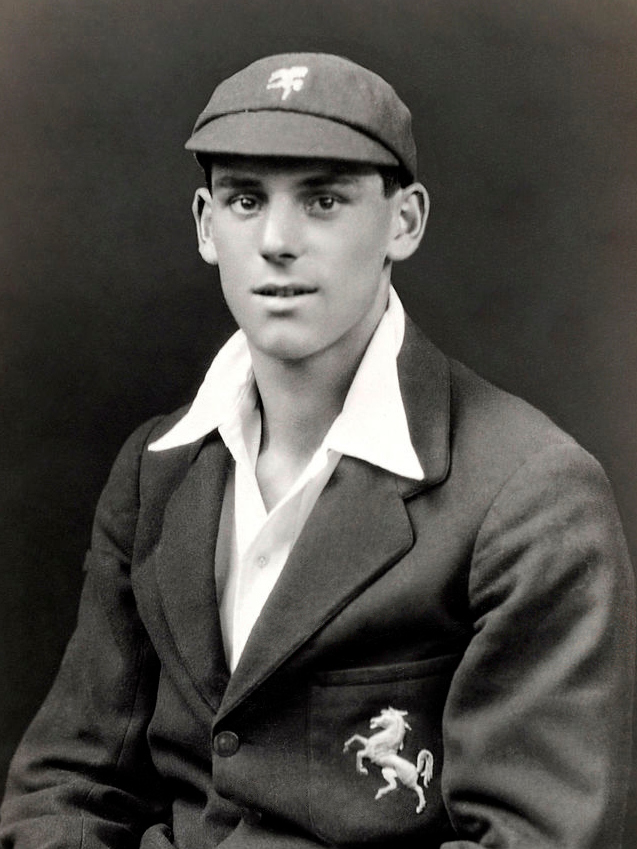

Personal information
- Full name: Leslie John Todd
- Born: 19 June 1907; Catford, London, England
- Died: 20 August 1967 (aged 60); Buckland, Kent, England
- Batting: Left-handed
- Bowling: Left arm medium; Slow left arm orthodox

Domestic team information
- Years: Team
- 1927–1950: Kent

Career statistics
Competition	First-class
Matches	437
Runs scored	20,087
Batting average	31.68
100s/50s	38/100
Top score	174
Balls bowled	35,699
Wickets	572
Bowling average	27.76
5 wickets in innings	20
10 wickets in match	1
Best bowling	6/26
Catches/stumpings	236/–
- Source: Cricinfo, 22 February 2010

Leslie John Todd (19 June 1907 – 20 August 1967) was an English cricketer. A left-handed all-rounder who at various points in his career bowled left-arm orthodox spin and medium-paced inswingers, he played in 437 first-class matches, the majority for Kent County Cricket Club. Making his debut for the county in 1927, Todd found opportunities limited until 1933 when he scored more than 1,000 runs in a season for the first time. He took over 80 wickets in five successive seasons, completing the double in 1937.

The Second World War saw Todd serve in the Royal Air Force, while also playing in charity matches for various sides. Following the war, he moved to the top of the batting order with great success, scoring over 2,000 runs in 1947, before he was forced to retire with eye problems in 1950. He briefly became a highly regarded umpire, before later moving into business. He died in Buckland, Kent in 1967.

== Career ==
=== Early career ===
Born in Catford, Todd was living in Camberwell when Kent offered him a trial in 1923. Seen as "a promising bowler", he made his second eleven debut for Kent in the Minor Counties Championship, taking three wickets in Bedfordshire's first innings. He continued to make appearances for Kent's second eleven in the Minor Counties Championship through to 1927, when he was promoted to the first team for his debut against Derbyshire. Batting at eight, he scored nought and four, but had shown enough promise to play four more County Championship matches that season. He scored his maiden half-century against Somerset in 1928, and almost completed a thousand runs in the 1929 season despite batting in the lower middle order.

Initially, Todd was asked to bowl left-arm orthodox spin by Kent, making him a near-replica of Frank Woolley. However, he only achieved moderate success with spin bowling, and it was when he switched to his natural medium pace bowling that he began to become a solid all-rounder. Unfortunately for Todd, whenever Kent's pool of talented amateur players became available he would often be one of the first names to make way, and this would remain the case until 1933.

=== Kent regular ===
The 1933 season proved to be Todd's breakthrough year. Established in the Kent middle order, he scored 1,743 runs at a batting average of 34.86, completing centuries against Northamptonshire, Gloucestershire and Surrey. He followed his breakthrough season with 1,897 runs the following year; the only season in which he averaged more than fifty with the bat, while he also served noticed of his bowling talents with a return of 4 for 10 against Lancashire.

Todd became a more regular bowler starting with the 1935 season, often sharing the new ball with either Alan Watt or Norman Harding. Having reverted to his more natural medium-paced bowling style, which offered pronounced in-swing, Todd took over 80 wickets in each of the next five seasons. 1936 saw Todd perform the double; scoring 1,320 runs and taking 103 wickets, while his 1,323 runs and 91 wickets in 1937 saw him invited to play in the end-of-season Test trial match.

=== War and post-war career ===
During the war years, Todd served in the Royal Air Force, rising to the rank of corporal by 1941 and sergeant by the end of the war. Based in the United Kingdom throughout the war, he played in many charity matches played during the war, notably for the Royal Air Force, London Counties and the British Empire XI. He also made four appearances for England representative sides at Lord's, and played as Rawtenstall's professional in the Lancashire League; finishing second in the league batting averages in 1945. His performances during the war, for the Royal Air Force amongst others, led to speculation that he might earn a call-up to the England team immediately following the war.

The first season after the war saw Todd make a return to the top of the order with success, finishing at the top of Kent's batting averages in that first season. The following season was designated as Todd's benefit season, with twelve collections taken at Kent's home matches raising £1,347. The season itself proved even more successful for Todd, with 2,312 runs coming from his bat and forming an effective opening partnership with Arthur Fagg. His run-scoring began to decline over the following two seasons, and he retired midway through the 1950 season due to eye problems (he had been struck by a delivery from Harold Larwood in 1930).

=== Post-playing career ===
Following the end of his playing career, Todd became a first-class umpire, officiating in 23 matches in the 1951 season and becoming highly rated. He stood down from the umpires list at the end of the 1951 season to go into business, however he came back to umpire five matches in 1964 and a further two in 1966. He died, having been in ill health for some time, in Buckland on 20 August 1967.

== Personality ==
Todd was regarded by many as being "a nightmare to handle", with his teammates often regarding him with "a mixture of affection and exasperation". The writer Evelyn Wellings once described Todd as being "the most perverse, most infuriating cricketer of his generation", while R. C. Robertson-Glasgow admitted his temperament was "a little susceptible".

Described as "cast by nature for the leading part", Todd was unlucky to play in the same team as the Kent greats Les Ames, Frank Woolley and Tich Freeman, and as such often felt that "his own act didn't matter very much". As such, he would often be incapable of a shot when quick runs were required, while when playing for a draw he would often play extravagant shots and get himself out. Wellings once told of a wartime match, in which he, Todd and Percy Chapman were fielding in the slips. When Todd chased a ball to the boundary, Chapman would follow him halfway, later admitting "I know he can easily throw the distance, but he won't if nobody backs him up".

== Cited sources ==
- Carlaw, Derek (2007). "Leslie John Todd". Kent County Cricket Club Annual. Kent County Cricket Club. pp. 52–54. ISBN 978-0-9527926-1-1.
