= William Hargreaves (cricketer) =

English cricketer

Personal information
- Full name: William Henry Hargreaves
- Born: 6 September 1872; Great Wymondley, Hertfordshire
- Died: 19 April 1948 (aged 75); Gravesend, Kent

Domestic team information
- Years: Team
- 1893: Kent

Career statistics
Competition	First-class
Matches	1
Runs scored	10
Batting average	5.00
100s/50s	0/0
Top score	10
Catches/stumpings	1/–
- Source: CricInfo, 20 October 2011

William Henry Hargreaves (6 September 1872 – 19 April 1948) was a cricketer who played one first-class cricket match for Kent County Cricket Club in 1893. He was born at Great Wymondley near Baldock in Hertfordshire in 1872.

Hargreaves made his only first-class appearance in June 1893 for Kent against Middlesex in the 1893 County Championship at Gravesend. Hargreaves is also known to have played twice for Kent's Second XI during the 1893 season and to have played for Chatham Cricket Club against the touring South Africans at New Brompton in 1894.

He died at Gravesend in Kent in April 1948 aged 75.

== Bibliography ==
- Carlaw, Derek (2020). Kent County Cricketers, A to Z: Part One (1806–1914) (PDF). Cardiff: ACS.
