= Walter George (cricketer) =

English cricketer

Personal information
- Full name: Walter George
- Born: 20 September 1847; Selling, Kent
- Died: 2 November 1938 (aged 91); Sydenham, Kent
- Batting: Right-handed
- Bowling: Left-arm fast-medium

Domestic team information
- Years: Team
- 1875: Kent
- FC debut: 31 May 1875 Kent v Sussex
- Last FC: 4 August 1875 Kent v Gentlemen of MCC

Career statistics
| Competition | First-class |
|---|---|
| Matches | 5 |
| Runs scored | 4 |
| Batting average | 1.33 |
| 100s/50s | 0/0 |
| Top score | 2* |
| Balls bowled | 657 |
| Wickets | 22 |
| Bowling average | 14.31 |
| 5 wickets in innings | 2 |
| 10 wickets in match | 0 |
| Best bowling | 7/86 |
| Catches/stumpings | 1/– |
- Source: CricInfo, 17 July 2017

Walter George (20 September 1847 – 2 November 1938) was an English first-class cricketer who played for Kent County Cricket Club in 1875.

George was born at Selling near Faversham in Kent in 1847. He played for Marylebone Cricket Club (MCC) in 1872 but did not make his first-class cricket debut until 1875 when he played five times for Kent as a bowler. George was a left-arm fast-medium roundarm bowler and took 22 first-class wickets in his five matches. He took 6 wickets for 32 runs against Hampshire and 7 for 86 against Derbyshire.

George's last known match was for Lord Harris' XI at Faversham in 1879. He died at Bell Green near Sydenham in Kent in 1938 at the age of 91.

== Bibliography ==
- Carlaw, Derek (2020). Kent County Cricketers, A to Z: Part One (1806–1914) (PDF). Cardiff: ACS.
