= William Candlett =

English cricketer

Personal information
- Born: c. 1847; Newton, Lancashire
- Died: 20 June 1904 (aged 56–57); Salford, Lancashire
- Batting: Right-handed
- Bowling: Right-arm medium

Domestic team information
- Years: Team
- 1880: Kent

Career statistics
Competition	First-class
Matches	1
Runs scored	3
Batting average	3.00
100s/50s	0/0
Top score	3
Balls bowled	36
Wickets	0
Bowling average	–
5 wickets in innings	–
10 wickets in match	–
Best bowling	–
Catches/stumpings	0/–
- Source: CricInfo, 29 June 2014

William Candlett (c. 1847 – 20 June 1904) was an English cricketer. Born at Newton in Lancashire, Candlett was a right-handed batsman who bowled right-arm medium pace.

He made one appearance in first-class cricket for Kent County Cricket Club against Yorkshire in 1880 at Mote Park in Maidstone.

He died at Salford in Lancashire on 20 June 1904.
