= Edward Greenwood =

English cricketer (1845–1899)

Personal information
- Born: 19 January 1845; St John's Wood, London
- Died: 25 January 1899 (aged 54); Cranleigh, Surrey
- Batting: Right-handed

Domestic team information
- Years: Team
- 1873: Kent
- Only FC: 10 July 1873 Kent v Lancashire

Career statistics
Competition	First-class
Matches	1
Runs scored	13
Batting average	6.50
100s/50s	0/0
Top score	13
Catches/stumpings	0/–
- Source: Cricinfo, 18 August 2012

Edward Greenwood (Note: An obituary notice published in The Daily News immediately after Greenwood's death gives his name as Mr C. E. Greenwood. Birth and death records simply record his name as Edward Greenwood.) (19 January 1845 – 25 January 1899) was an English cricketer who played in one first-class cricket match for Kent County Cricket Club in 1873.

Greenwood was born at St John's Wood in London, the youngest son of John and Jane Greenwood (née Coar). His father worked as a solicitor and the family, which had houses in London and at Hildenborough, was wealthy enough for Greenwood to not need to work. He lived at Hildenborough near Tunbridge Wells throughout most of his life and played cricket for local teams, including Tonbridge, Edenbridge and Tunbridge Wells Cricket Club. Greenwood made his only first-class appearance for Kent against Lancashire in 1873 at Gravesend, scoring 13 runs in his second innings after making a duck in the first.

An accomplished club cricketer, Greenwood played in matches against the United South of England XI and the New United South of England XI, and also for at least ten significant clubs in Kent and Sussex. (Note: As well as Tonbridge, Edenbridge and Tunbridge Wells, Greenwood is known to have played for clubs at Hadlow, Hildenborough, Leigh, Sevenoaks, Southborough, Wateringbury and Hastings.) He scored 97 not out for Sevenoaks Vine against Chislehurst in 1873 and later the same year his innings of 53 for Tunbridge Wells at the Higher Common Ground was considered by the Kent and Sussex Courier to be "the finest display seen on the Common for many years". Although he bowled infrequently in club matches as he got older, he had taken nine wickets for the cost of just five runs for Leigh in 1863. He played club cricket until at least 1885.

Greenwood married Mary Hollingdale in 1886 but had no children. He died at Smithwood House at Cranleigh in Surrey in 1899 aged 54. The cause of death was recorded as alcoholism, although an obituary published immediately after his death in The Daily News attributed Greenwood's death to blood poisoning caused by a rabbit bite.

== Bibliography ==
- Carlaw, Derek (2020). Kent County Cricketers, A to Z: Part One (1806–1914) (PDF). Cardiff: ACS.
