= Thomas Swinford =

English cricketer and army officer

Personal information
- Full name: Thomas Francis Swinford
- Born: 9 May 1839; Minster-in-Thanet, Kent
- Died: 23 January 1915 (aged 75); Polegate, Sussex
- Batting: Right-handed

Domestic team information
- Years: Team
- 1874: Kent

Career statistics
Competition	First-class
Matches	4
Runs scored	89
Batting average	11.12
100s/50s	0/1
Top score	50
Catches/stumpings	0/–
- Source: Cricinfo, 26 June 2014

Captain Thomas Francis Swinford (9 May 1839 – 23 January 1915) was an English army officer and cricketer who played in four first-class cricket matches in 1874. Born at Minster-in-Thanet near Ramsgate in Kent, Swinford was a right-handed batsman.

Educated at Blackheath Proprietary School, Swinford played his first-class matches for Kent County Cricket Club. His debut was against Derbyshire. He was described in his Wisden obituary as a "good batsman and long-stop" who had made a half-century against Lancashire.

He served as a captain in the 98th Regiment. He died at Polegate near Eastbourne in Sussex in January 1915 aged 75.

== Bibliography ==
- Carlaw, Derek (2020). Kent County Cricketers, A to Z: Part One (1806–1914) (PDF). Cardiff: ACS.
