= Edward Curteis =

English cricketer

Personal information
- Full name: Edward Witherden Curteis
- Born: 17 April 1853; Corsley, Wiltshire
- Died: 25 February 1902 (aged 48); Mottram Hall, Mottram St Andrew, Cheshire
- Batting: Right-handed

Domestic team information
- Years: Team
- 1877: Kent
- FC debut: 30 July 1877 Kent v Hampshire
- Last FC: 2 June 1887 Marylebone Cricket Club (MCC) v Oxford University

Career statistics
| Competition | First-class |
|---|---|
| Matches | 2 |
| Runs scored | 17 |
| Batting average | 5.66 |
| 100s/50s | 0/0 |
| Top score | 8 |
| Catches/stumpings | 0/– |
- Source: CricInfo, 11 June 2022

Edward Witherden Curteis (17 April 1853 – 25 February 1902) was an English soldier who played first-class cricket.

== Early life ==
Curteis was born at Sturford House near to Corsley in Wiltshire, the third son of Frederick and Mary Curteis (née Whitby). His father was a Justice of the Peace in Kent and the family lived at Tunbridge Wells in the county. Curteis was educated at Tonbridge School from 1865 to 1869; he played in the cricket XI in his final two years at school, as captain in 1869.

== Military career ==
After leaving school, Curteis enrolled at the Royal Military College Sandhurst where he also played cricket during 1870. He was commissioned as an ensign in the 24th Regiment (South Wales Borderers) in 1871 and promoted to lieutenant in 1872. He was posted to Malta before moving to Gibraltar in 1874 and then serving in Griqualand West in Southern Africa during 1875.

In 1877 Curteis was posted to the regiment's depot at Brecon in South Wales, a post he served at for the remainder of his career. He was promoted to the rank captain in 1880 and retired in 1884.

== Cricket ==
Curteis played services cricket regularly and has been described as a "prolific scorer". He played for the amateur Gentlemen of Kent in 1872 and made his first-class cricket debut for Kent County Cricket Club in 1877, scoring nine runs on debut against Hampshire at Canterbury. Whilst posted to Brecon he played for the South Wales Cricket Club, including in a match against the touring Australians in 1878. His only other first-class match was for Marylebone Cricket Club (MCC) against Oxford University in 1887 in which he scored 8 runs.

== Family ==
Both of Curteis' brothers were also educated at Tonbridge, both also playing cricket and football for the school. His eldest brother, Reginald, went up to Trinity College, Cambridge before becoming a Church of England clergyman after briefly serving in the Kent Militia. His other rotor, William, was a noted high jumper at school. He went up to Jesus College, Oxford before joining the Army, serving in the 22nd Foot. He rose to the rank of lieutenant-colonel and was on active service in the Second Boer War before being awarded the Order of the Bath in 1901 before dying later the same year.

Curteis married Mary White in 1884. The couple had one son. He died at Mottram Hall, the home of his father-in-law, near Macclesfield in Cheshire in February 1902 aged 48.

== Bibliography ==
- Carlaw, Derek (2020). Kent County Cricketers, A to Z: Part One (1806–1914) (PDF). Cardiff: ACS.
