= William Carter (Kent cricketer) =

English cricketer

William Carter (c. 1822 – 10 October 1847) was an English cricketer who played in the mid-1840s.

Carter was born at Southfleet near Gravesend in Kent. He was a miller by trade and played in three first-class cricket matches for Kent County Cricket Club, one against Sussex in 1845 and two against Surrey the following year. Although he "achieved little" for the county team, Carter was bowling regularly with success in club cricket, mainly playing for Dartford and Gravesend. He is known to have taken five-wickets in an innings at least five times in club cricket between 1845 and 1847, including taking 10 wickets in a match for Gravesend against the Cambridge Town Club in 1847.

Later the same year Carter died at Southfleet. He was aged 24 or 25 at the time of his death.

== Bibliography ==
- Carlaw, Derek (2020). Kent County Cricketers, A to Z: Part One (1806–1914) (PDF). Cardiff: ACS.
