= Robert Sewell (cricketer) =

English cricketer

Robert Page Sewell (3 September 1866 – 7 February 1901) was an English first-class cricketer active 1884–95 who played for Kent. He was born in Maldon and died in Surbiton.

== Bibliography ==
- Carlaw, Derek (2020). Kent County Cricketers, A to Z: Part One (1806–1914) (PDF). Cardiff: ACS.
