= Vero Shaw =

Indian-English cricketer (1854–1905)

Vero Kemball Shaw (14 January 1854 – 18 December 1905) was an Indian-born English cricketer who played first-class cricket for Cambridge University and Kent County Cricket Club in 34 matches between 1875 and 1878. He was born at Belgaum in India and died at Hastings in Sussex. Late in life he added the name "Mackenzie" to his surname, as his father had also done.

Shaw was educated at Haileybury and Imperial Service College and at Emmanuel College, Cambridge. He matriculated at Cambridge University in the autumn of 1872 and appeared in trial matches for the university cricket team in both 1873 and 1874, without being selected for any first-class matches. In 1875, he fared better and was picked as a right-handed lower-order batsman and a left-arm fast bowler in the round-arm style for three Cambridge first-class matches, but with little success: he had been discarded from the Cambridge team long before the 1875 University Match, for which he was not selected. He had much greater success at the end of the 1875 season in a few games for Kent, however. Kent's game against Lancashire finished with Lancashire being set just 18 to win in their second innings; Shaw opened the bowling and took four wickets for 11 runs, the best bowling figures of his first-class career, so that Lancashire won, but only by a margin of five wickets. In the next game he hit 54 when opening the batting against the weak Hampshire team.

The 1876 season saw Shaw as a regular member of the Cambridge University team, employed as a lower-order batsman and a change bowler used as economical relief to the main bowling attack. He played in the 1876 University Match against Oxford University, bowling in each Oxford innings, though failing to take a wicket, and scoring 0 in his only batting innings; Cambridge, however, won the match by nine wickets. Playing for Kent later in the same season and opening the batting once more, he made a score of 74 against Surrey which was his highest first-class score.

Shaw graduated from Cambridge with a Bachelor of Arts degree in 1876. He continued to play first-class cricket in occasional games for Kent in 1877 and 1878, but with little success. He became chief of the Clan Shaw of Tordarroch, sometimes called "Clan Ay", changed his name to "Shaw-Mackenzie" as his father had also done, and became a Justice of the Peace in Ross and Cromarty. He did not marry, and was succeeded as clan chief by his brother.

== Bibliography ==
- Carlaw, Derek (2020). Kent County Cricketers, A to Z: Part One (1806–1914) (PDF). Cardiff: ACS.
