= Stevens Brown =

English cricketer

Stevens William Brown (15 April 1875 – 21 October 1957) was an English professional cricketer who played in three first-class cricket matches for Kent County Cricket Club in the space of 10 days in 1899.

Brown was born in Cliffe, Kent and initially worked in the cement industry as a labourer. He was taken on at Kent's Tonbridge Nursery as a promising young cricketer in 1899 and played his three first-class matches during that season, against Essex, the Marylebone Cricket Club and Sussex. He was used as a bowler, as most of the young professionals at the Nursery were, taking five wickets. He remained part of the Nursery until 1901.

In 1911 Brown was the landlord of a public house in Chatham but by 1918, when he enlisted in the Royal Navy, he was working as an engineer. Brown, who had become eligible for service only after the Military Services Act raised the age limit for enlistment to between 41 and 50 in 1918, served at the former Royal Naval Air Service Experimental Station at Stratford as a Mechanic 2nd Class until the end of the war. He was demobilised in January 1919 and died, aged 82, at Watford in Hertfordshire in October 1957.

== Bibliography ==
- Carlaw, Derek (2020). Kent County Cricketers, A to Z: Part One (1806–1914) (PDF). Cardiff: ACS.
