= George Beslee =

English cricketer

Personal information
- Full name: George Prior Beslee
- Born: 27 March 1904; Cliffe, Kent
- Died: 3 November 1975 (aged 71); Tonbridge, Kent
- Batting: Right-handed
- Bowling: Right-arm fast-medium
- Role: Bowler

Domestic team information
- Years: Team
- 1925–1930: Kent

Career statistics
Competition	First-class
Matches	63
Runs scored	439
Batting average	7.19
100s/50s	0/0
Top score	24
Balls bowled	9,175
Wickets	133
Bowling average	31.57
5 wickets in innings	0
10 wickets in match	0
Best bowling	4/27
Catches/stumpings	30/–
- Source: CricInfo, 26 March 2017

George Prior Beslee (27 March 1904 – 3 November 1975) was an English cricketer who played for Kent County Cricket Club between 1925 and 1930. A right-arm fast-medium bowler, Beslee played 63 first-class cricket matches for Kent.

== Early life ==
Beslee was born in March 1904 in Cliffe, a village on the Hoo Peninsula in Kent.

== Cricket career ==
Beslee made his debut for Kent Second XI in July 1924 against Sussex Second XI. He played for Kent in the Minor Counties Championship through August 1924.

Beslee was called up to the Kent First XI during the 1925 County Championship and made his first-class cricket debut against Middlesex in June. He played in three more County Championship matches that season, and continued to play for the second team.

In 1926 he again appeared only sporadically for the First XI and took only 11 wickets in the season before taking 32 wickets at a bowling average of 29.65 in 1927 and 21 wickets in 1928. The 1929 season was Beslee's most successful in county cricket. He took 51 wickets, including his career-best 4/27, at an average of 26.35 which was also his best for a season. He played his final first-class match for Kent in July 1930 against Surrey at The Oval.

== Later life ==
Beslee died in Tonbridge in Kent in 1975 at the age of 71.

== Bibliography ==
- Carlaw, Derek (2020). Kent County Cricketers, A to Z: Part Two (1919–1939) (PDF). Cardiff: ACS.
