= William Morris (English cricketer) =

English cricketer (1873–1945)

Personal information
- Born: 23 November 1873; Lee, Kent
- Died: 6 May 1945 (aged 71); Westminster, London
- Batting: Right-handed
- Role: Batsman

Domestic team information
- Years: Team
- 1896: Kent

Career statistics
Competition	First-class
Matches	2
Runs scored	14
Batting average	3.50
100s/50s	0/0
Top score	6
Catches/stumpings	0/–
- Source: CricInfo, 21 August 2012

William Morris (23 November 1873 – 6 May 1945) was an English cricketer who played in two first-class cricket matches for Kent County Cricket Club in 1896.

Morris was born in 1873 at Lee in Blackheath, at that point part of Kent. His father, also William, was a solicitor and Morris followed him into the profession after attending St Mark's School in Windsor.

Playing his club cricket for Granville Cricket Club, Morris was a "prolific" batsman who scored nine centuries for the club between 1894 and 1899, including a score of 235 not out in 1895. He played occasionally for the Gentlemen of Kent and made another double hundred for Dulwich Cricket Club in 1896. During the same year he made his two first-class cricket appearances for Kent. His debut came against Marylebone Cricket Club (MCC) at Lord's, with his second match against Nottinghamshire in the County Championship at Beckenham. He failed to reach double figures in either match, with a highest first-class score of six runs. He also made two Second XI appearances for Kent in 1896, both against Middlesex Seconds.

Morris moved to Birmingham in 1899, where he played cricket for Leamington Cricket Club and the Gentlemen of Warwickshire. He married Clara Creighton in 1899; the couple had five children. Morris died at Westminster in London in May 1945 at the age of 71.

== Bibliography ==
- Carlaw, Derek (2020). Kent County Cricketers, A to Z: Part One (1806–1914) (PDF). Cardiff: ACS.
