= Colin Fairservice =

English cricketer

Personal information
- Full name: Colin Fairservice
- Born: 6 August 1909; Hadlow, Kent
- Died: 29 December 1999 (aged 90); Canterbury, Kent
- Batting: Right-handed
- Bowling: Right-arm off-break
- Relatives: Bill Fairservice (father)

Domestic team information
- Years: Team
- 1929–1933: Kent
- 1934–1936: Marylebone Cricket Club (MCC)
- 1936: Middlesex
- FC debut: 22 June 1929 Kent v Derbyshire
- Last FC: 20 June 1936 Middlesex v MCC

Career statistics
Competition	First-class
Matches	74
Runs scored	1,650
Batting average	17.55
100s/50s	1/6
Top score	110
Balls bowled	1,519
Wickets	18
Bowling average	38.55
5 wickets in innings	0
10 wickets in match	0
Best bowling	3/49
Catches/stumpings	44/–
- Source: CricInfo, 14 June 2017

Colin Fairservice (6 August 1909 – 29 December 1999) was an English professional cricketer. He played for Kent County Cricket Club from 1929 to 1933 and for Middlesex County Cricket Club in 1936, making a total of 74 first-class cricket appearances in his career.

Fairservice was born in Hadlow in Kent in 1909, the son of Bill Fairservice who made over 300 first-class appearances for Kent between 1902 and 1921. He grew up in Kent and Northumberland and attended Newcastle Royal Grammar School.

Having played for Northumberland Juniors, Fairservice first played for Kent Second XI in the Minor Counties Championship in 1927. He made his first-class debut in 1929 against Derbyshire at Queen's Park, Chesterfield. After playing occasionally for the county in 1929 and 1930 he became a regular in the First XI in 1931 and was awarded his county cap in that season. Fairservice made a total of 59 appearances for Kent before leaving the county at the end of the 1933 season. He spent the following two years qualifying to play for Middlesex, during which he made occasional first-class appearances for Marylebone Cricket Club (MCC). During 1936 he played six times for Middlesex before ending his first-class career.

Fairservice worked at Stonyhurst College and then coached cricket and rugby at The King's School, Canterbury between 1954 and 1975. He coached David Gower who went on to captain the England cricket team. He died at Canterbury in 1999 aged 90, at the time Kent's oldest living cricketer.

== Bibliography ==
- Carlaw, Derek (2020). Kent County Cricketers, A to Z: Part Two (1919–1939) (PDF). Cardiff: ACS.
