= Andrew Hooper (cricketer) =

English cricketer

Personal information
- Full name: Andrew James Mendez Hooper
- Born: 17 September 1945 (age 81); Denmark Hill, London
- Batting: Right-handed
- Bowling: Slow left-arm orthodox
- Relatives: Matthew Hooper (son)

Domestic team information
- Years: Team
- 1966–1969: Kent
- FC debut: 3 August 1966 Kent v Warwickshire
- Last FC: 9 August 1969 Kent v Sussex

Career statistics
Competition	First-class
Matches	13
Runs scored	70
Batting average	7.77
100s/50s	0/0
Top score	35
Balls bowled	959
Wickets	16
Bowling average	30.81
5 wickets in innings	1
10 wickets in match	0
Best bowling	6/92
Catches/stumpings	7/–
- Source: CricInfo, 5 February 2012

Andrew James Mendez Hooper (born 17 September 1945) is an English former cricketer who played for Kent County Cricket Club between 1966 and 1969.

Hooper was born at Denmark Hill in London in 1945. He made his first-class cricket debut for Kent against Warwickshire in the 1966 County Championship at Canterbury, having played for the county's Second XI earlier the same season. He played primarily as a left-arm spin bowler, making 13 first-class appearances for Kent. His final match for the county was against Sussex in August 1969.

Hooper played regularly for Blackheath Cricket Club in the Kent Cricket League, captaining the First XI and winning the league Player of the Season award in 1984. He was capped by the Club Cricket Conference in 1980, playing for the CCC team between 1980 and 1984. In 1984 he moved to Hampshire where he played for Andover Cricket Club and was Director of Cricket and President at the club.

Hooper had four children, all of who played cricket in some form. One of his sons, Matthew Hooper, made a single first-class appearance for Cambridge UCCE in 2005.

== Bibliography ==
- Carlaw, Derek (2024). Kent County Cricketers, A to Z: Part Three (1946–1999) (PDF). Cardiff: ACS.
