= Norman Morris (English cricketer) =

English cricketer

Personal information
- Full name: Norman Morris
- Born: 1849; Peckham, Surrey
- Died: 20 January 1874 (aged 25); Ford, Lingfield, Surrey
- Batting: Right-handed
- Role: Wicket-keeper

Domestic team information
- Years: Team
- 1870–1872: Kent
- 1873: Surrey
- FC debut: 21 July 1870 Kent v Yorkshire
- Last FC: 11 August 1873 Surrey v Yorkshire

Career statistics
Competition	First-class
Matches	17
Runs scored	473
Batting average	14.33
100s/50s	0/1
Top score	64
Balls bowled	12
Wickets	0
Bowling average	–
5 wickets in innings	0
10 wickets in match	0
Best bowling	–
Catches/stumpings	7/4
- Source: CricInfo, 22 December 2018

Norman Morris (1849 – 20 January 1874) (Note: Both the Register of Tonbridge School and Alumni cantabrigienses give Morris' date of death as 24 January 1874. CricInfo and CricketArchive both give it as 20 January 1874.) was an English amateur cricketer who played between 1870 and 1873.

Morris was born at Peckham in Surrey, the son of Norman Morris. He was educated at Tonbridge School in Kent between 1863 and 1868 and then at Jesus College, Cambridge. He played cricket in the school XI for three years, as captain in his final year.

Morris made his first-class cricket debut for Kent County Cricket Club in July 1870 at Gravesend in a match against Yorkshire. He played in 10 matches for the county until the end of 1872 before playing five times for Surrey during 1873. Morris also made appearances for Marylebone Cricket Club (MCC) and the Gentlemen of the South in 1873 and played club cricket for MCC and the Gentlemen of Kent.

Morris worked in the London Stock Exchange. He died near Lingfield in Surrey in January 1874 aged 25.

== Bibliography ==
- Carlaw, Derek (2020). Kent County Cricketers, A to Z: Part One (1806–1914) (PDF). Cardiff: ACS.
