= Isaac Ingram =

English cricketer

Personal information
- Full name: Isaac Ingram
- Born: 14 May 1855; Leigh, Kent
- Died: 19 November 1947 (aged 92); Leigh, Kent
- Batting: Right-handed
- Role: Wicket-keeper

Domestic team information
- Years: Team
- 1878–1879: Kent

Career statistics
Competition	First-class
Matches	12
Runs scored	112
Batting average	5.89
100s/50s	0/0
Top score	25
Catches/stumpings	8/7
- Source: Cricinfo, 2 January 2012

Isaac Ingram (14 May 1855 – 19 November 1947) was an English professional cricketer. He was a right-handed batsman who fielded as a wicket-keeper. He was born at Leigh near Tonbridge in Kent in 1855.

Ingram made his first-class cricket debut for Kent County Cricket Club against Marylebone Cricket Club (MCC) in May 1878 at Lord's. He played a total of 11 times for the county in 1878 before appearing one final time against Nottinghamshire at Canterbury in 1879. In local cricket he played for Leigh Cricket Club and for Chiddingstone Causeway where he worked making Dukes cricket balls in the company's factory.

Ingram received a pension of 7/6d from Kent until he died at Leigh in November 1947 aged 92.

== Bibliography ==
- Carlaw, Derek (2020). Kent County Cricketers, A to Z: Part One (1806–1914) (PDF). Cardiff: ACS.
