= Ronald Bailey (cricketer) =

English cricketer (1923–1990)

Personal information
- Full name: Ronald Anthony Bailey
- Born: 30 July 1923; Camberwell, London
- Died: 28 September 1990 (aged 67); Sissinghurst, Kent
- Batting: Right-handed
- Bowling: Right-arm medium
- Role: Bowler

Domestic team information
- Years: Team
- 1948–1953: Royal Navy
- 1948: Kent
- FC debut: 3 July 1948 Kent v Warwickshire
- Last FC: 14 July 1948 Kent v Northants
- Source: CricInfo, 5 April 2014

Ronald Anthony Bailey (30 July 1923 – 28 September 1990), born Anthony Ronald Bailey, was an English cricketer who served in the Royal Navy. He played in three first-class cricket matches for Kent County Cricket Club in 1948.

Bailey was born at Camberwell in London in 1923. He served in the Royal Navy and made all three of his first-class appearances for Kent during July 1948. Kent were searching for a replacement for Norman Harding, an established fast bowler who had died in the 1947 polio epidemic after the end of the previous season and Bailey, a right-arm bowler, was tried in the team. He opened the bowling in each of his three matches, but took only two wickets. In his five first-class innings he failed to score a run. He made a single appearance for the county's Second XI in August 1948, taking six wickets, and played several times for the Royal Navy cricket team between 1948 and 1953.

Bailey died in 1990 at Sissinghurst near Tunbridge Wells in Kent. He was aged 67.
