= William Constable (cricketer) =

English cricketer (1851–1894)

William Constable (21 March 1851 – 31 January 1894) was an English cricketer. He was a right-handed batsman and a right-arm round-arm bowler who played one first-class cricket match for Kent County Cricket Club in 1876.

Constable was born at Poplar in London in 1851, the son of William and Louisa Constable. His father was a rope maker, the family moving at some point to live in the Medway Towns in Kent. He played in five Kent Colts' matches between 1874 and 1876, playing as an opening batsman before making his only first-class appearance for the Kent team against Hampshire in June 1876, scoring a single run in two innings.

A club cricketer for Rochester, Constable worked for a blacksmith in Chatham and ran a fishmonger's and poulterer's business on Rochester High Street. He married Mary Williams in 1876 and died at Rochester in 1894 aged 42.

== Bibliography ==
- Carlaw, Derek (2020). Kent County Cricketers, A to Z: Part One (1806–1914) (PDF). Cardiff: ACS.
