= Frederick Hollands =

English cricketer

Fred Hollands
Personal information
- Full name: Frederick Hollands
- Born: 7 October 1822; Leeds, Kent
- Died: 30 June 1898 (aged 75); Broomfield, Kent
- Height: 6 ft 2 in (1.88 m)
- Batting: Left-handed
- Bowling: Slow left-arm orthodox

Domestic team information
- Years: Team
- 1849–1859: Kent
- FC debut: 21 June 1849 Kent v All-England Eleven
- Last FC: 1 August 1859 Kent v Sussex

Career statistics
Competition	First-class
Matches	31
Runs scored	322
Batting average	6.31
100s/50s	0/1
Top score	52
Balls bowled	3,610
Wickets	124
Bowling average	12.42
5 wickets in innings	11
10 wickets in match	0
Best bowling	6/15
Catches/stumpings	25/–
- Source: CricInfo, 14 June 2022

Frederick Hollands (7 October 1822 – 30 June 1898) was an English professional cricketer who played for Kent County Cricket Club between 1849 and 1859. He played in a total of 31 first-class cricket matches.

Hollands was born at Leeds, Kent in 1822, the son of Edwin and Mary Hollands. His father was an agricultural labourer. Hollands, who was a left-arm spin bowler, played club cricket for Town Malling, Gravesend, The Mote, and others. After bowling impressively for West Kent in 1848, taking 12 wickets and dismissing both Fuller Pilch and Alfred Mynn, he made his first-class debut the following season, playing for Kent against an All-England XI at Gravesend.

Considered a valuable bowler whose height, he was 6 feet 2 inches (1.88 m), meant that his deliveries bounced effectively, Hollands played regularly for Kent throughout the 1850s, taking over 100 wickets in the 29 first-class matches he played for Kent. He took five-wickets in an innings 11 times and bowled unchanged throughout a match with Ned Willsher at Lord's against Marylebone Cricket Club (MCC) in 1856. He took six wickets for 56 runs (6/56) for England against Nottinghamshire in 1855, and his best innings figures of 6/15 for Kent against MCC at Gravesend in 1857. He was a prolific bowler in minor matches, regularly playing for Kentish clubs against touring professional elevens.

Hollands did not play first-class cricket after 1859, but retained an interest in the county―Lord Harris recalled that Hollands would wait for news of Kent's results at the "side of the road". He worked as a gamekeeper at Leeds Park from the 1870s, although Scores and Biographies describes him as a "wood dealer". He married Alice Quartermaine at Sandwich in 1851; the couple had three children. Hollands died at Broomfield in 1898 aged 75.

== Bibliography ==
- Carlaw, Derek (2020). Kent County Cricketers, A to Z: Part One (1806–1914) (PDF). Cardiff: ACS.
