= Charles Davy =

Indian-born English cricketer

Charles Vinicombe Butler Davy (24 October 1869 – 10 September 1931) was an Indian-born English amateur cricketer. He was a left-handed batsman and a slow left-arm orthodox bowler. Davy was born in Mercara in British India in 1869 and died in Vancouver in Canada in 1931 aged 61.

Davy was educated at Cheltenham College and played in the school First XI in 1888 as well as for a Public Schools team. He made two appearances for the Gentlemen of Kent in 1892 before and after his only first-class cricket match against Middlesex in the 1892 County Championship at Rectory Field, Blackheath. He scored a total of 35 first-class runs and took one wicket. Davy played in one further known cricket match, for Bangkok against Singapore in 1909.

== Bibliography ==
- Carlaw, Derek (2020). Kent County Cricketers, A to Z: Part One (1806–1914) (PDF). Cardiff: ACS.
