= Alan Watt (cricketer) =

English cricketer

Personal information
- Full name: Alan Edward Watt
- Born: 19 June 1907; Limpsfield Chart, Surrey, England
- Died: 3 February 1974 (aged 66); Pembury, Kent, England
- Batting: Right-handed
- Bowling: Right arm fast-medium

Domestic team information
- Years: Team
- 1929–1939: Kent

Career statistics
Competition	First-class
Matches	230
Runs scored	4,100
Batting average	13.99
100s/50s	0/10
Top score	96
Balls bowled	38,586
Wickets	610
Bowling average	28.82
5 wickets in innings	34
10 wickets in match	6
Best bowling	8/100
Catches/stumpings	134/–
- Source: CricketArchive, 26 February 2010

Alan Edward Watt (19 June 1907 – 3 February 1974) was an English cricketer. A fast-medium bowler and aggressive lower-order batsman, Watt made 230 appearances in first-class cricket, in the most part for Kent County Cricket Club.

Born in Limpsfield Chart, Watt's first-class career began while Kent's star spin bowler Tich Freeman was at the height of his powers. Watt was therefore used primarily to take the shine off the ball in preparation for Freeman's imminent bowling spell. After the retirement of Freeman, Watt struck up an effective opening bowling partnership with all-rounder Leslie Todd, and took 108 wickets in the 1937 season. A tireless bowler, Watt could achieve late swing, which accounted for many of his victims.

As a batsman, Watt was renowned as an aggressive player, forming a trio with Middlesex's Jim Smith and Somerset's Arthur Wellard well known for hitting sixes. Watt and Wellard would both play for the London Counties cricket team during the Second World War, entertaining crowds during the 1941 season. Technically Watt excelled with the drive and the pull.

Later in life he kept the Star Inn in Matfield, before he died in Pembury Hospital in 1974.

== Bibliography ==
- Carlaw, Derek (2020). Kent County Cricketers, A to Z: Part Two (1919–1939) (PDF). Cardiff: ACS.
