= Richard Hills (cricketer) =

English cricketer

Personal information
- Full name: Richard William Hills
- Born: 8 January 1951 (age 75); Borough Green, Kent
- Batting: Right-handed
- Bowling: Right-arm medium
- Role: Bowler

Domestic team information
- Years: Team
- 1973–1980: Kent
- FC debut: 18 July 1973 Kent v West Indians
- Last FC: 23 August 1980 Kent v Surrey
- LA debut: 19 May 1973 Kent v Sussex
- Last LA: 31 August 1980 Kent v Gloucestershire

Career statistics
Competition	First-class	List A
Matches	85	101
Runs scored	995	518
Batting average	14.21	12.95
100s/50s	0/0	0/0
Top score	45	34
Balls bowled	9.066	3,995
Wickets	161	99
Bowling average	27.91	27.33
5 wickets in innings	2	1
10 wickets in match	0	0
Best bowling	6/64	5/28
Catches/stumpings	33/–	26/–
- Source: Cricinfo, 5 April 2014

Richard William Hills (born 8 January 1951) is a former English professional cricketer. He was born in Borough Green in Kent and played for Kent County Cricket Club between 1973 and 1980.

Hills first played for Kent's Second XI in 1968 before going on to make his senior debut for the side in the 1973 Benson & Hedges Cup against Sussex. He made his first-class cricket debut later the same season, playing against the touring West Indians in July at Canterbury. He went on to appear in over 180 first team matches for Kent as a bowler, playing regularly between 1975 and 1980 when he left the club.

A medium-pace bowler, Hills took two five wicket hauls during his first-class career. His best first-class bowling figures of 6/64 were taken against Gloucestershire at Folkestone in 1978. He was awarded his county cap in 1977 and was part of the Kent teams which won the County Championship in 1977 and 1978 and six one-day trophies from 1973 to 1978.

After retiring from cricket at the end of the 1980 season, Hills became a teacher. He coached cricket at Eltham College and Sevenoaks School.
