= Arthur Snowden (cricketer) =

English cricketer and teacher

Personal information
- Full name: Arthur Owen Snowden
- Born: 7 May 1885; St Peters, Broadstairs, Kent
- Died: 22 May 1964 (aged 79); Canterbury, Kent
- Batting: Right-handed
- Bowling: Left-arm medium

Domestic team information
- Years: Team
- 1905: Oxford University
- 1911–1912: Marylebone Cricket Club (MCC)
- 1911: Kent
- FC debut: 22 May 1905 Oxford University v Gentlemen of England
- Last FC: 1 May 1912 MCC v Nottinghamshire

Career statistics
Competition	First-class
Matches	6
Runs scored	142
Batting average	14.20
100s/50s	0/1
Top score	54
Balls bowled	78
Wickets	0
Bowling average	–
5 wickets in innings	–
10 wickets in match	–
Best bowling	–
Catches/stumpings	2/–
- Source: ESPNcricinfo, 7 March 2017

Arthur Owen Snowden (7 May 1885 – 22 May 1964) was a teacher and an English amateur cricketer. He played in six first-class cricket matches between 1905 and 1912.

== Early life and education ==
Snowden was born at Broadstairs in Kent, the oldest child of Augusta and the Reverend Harcourt Snowden. His father founded and ran Hildersham House school, a private school for boys in Broadstairs, and Snowden attended the school before moving to Rugby School aged 13. He played cricket for the school First XI between 1901 and 1903 and was captain in his final year. In October 1903 Snowden went up to Trinity College, Oxford, gaining a degree and, in 1910, a master's degree. He became a school teacher at Hildersham House.

== Cricket career ==
After playing successfully at school, Snowden made his first-class cricket debut in May 1905 for Oxford University against the Gentlemen of England at the University Parks in Oxford. He played three first-class matches for the university in 1905 but was not awarded a Blue. After first appearing for the Kent County Cricket Club Second XI in 1908, he made three further first-class appearances in 1911 and 1912, once for Kent against the Indian tourists, and twice for Marylebone Cricket Club (MCC). He played for Kent Second XI between 1911 and 1914 in the Minor Counties Championship but was generally restricted to playing cricket during school holidays by his job.

He played occasional matches for teams such as Old Rugbeians, Free Foresters and Band of Brothers until the 1930s. He was Kent's librarian towards the end of his life.

== War service ==
Snowden enlisted in the army in December 1915 as part of the Derby Scheme, initially as a private in the Army Reserve. He passed a medical in December 1916 but was not posted until he was accepted into the Officer Training Corps in May 1918. He saw no active service and was demobilised in February 1919.

== Family and later life ==
Snowden married Molly Woodman at Pimlico in January 1913. The couple lived in Broadstairs where Snowden taught alongside his brother at Hildersham House. In 1915 his brother, Harcourt, was killed on active service in France and Snowden became headmaster at the school. He died in May 1964 at his home in Canterbury aged 79.

== Bibliography ==
- Carlaw, Derek (2020). Kent County Cricketers, A to Z: Part One (1806–1914) (PDF). Cardiff: ACS.
