= Guy Spelman =

English cricketer

Guy Spleman
Personal information
- Full name: Guy Dennis Spelman
- Born: 18 October 1958 (age 68); Westminster, London
- Batting: Left-handed
- Bowling: Right-arm medium

Domestic team information
- Years: Team
- 1978–1982: Kent

Career statistics
Competition	First-class	List A
Matches	7	6
Runs scored	9	2
Batting average	1.50	2.00
100s/50s	0/0	0/0
Top score	4	2*
Balls bowled	727	245
Wickets	10	7
Bowling average	35.70	27.71
5 wickets in innings	0	0
10 wickets in match	0	0
Best bowling	2/27	3/30
Catches/stumpings	2/–	0/–
- Source: Cricinfo, 5 February 2012

Guy Dennis Spelman (born 18 October 1958) is a former English cricketer. Spelman was a left-handed batsman who bowled right-arm medium pace. He was born at Westminster in London.

Spelman made his debut for Kent County Cricket Club in a List A match against Yorkshire in the 1978 John Player League. He played List A cricket for Kent until 1980, making six appearances, the last of which came against Middlesex in the 1980 John Player League. Spelman, whose main role was a bowler, took 7 wickets in his six List A matches, which came at an average of 27.71, with best figures of 3/30. It wasn't until 1980 that Spelman made his first-class debut for the county against Sussex in the County Championship. He made six further first-class appearances for Kent, the last of which came against Oxford University in 1982. In his seven first-class appearances, he took 10 wickets at an average of 35.70, with best figures of 2/27.
