= Alfred Elcome =

English cricketer

Alfred Elcome (christened 29 December 1833 – died 25 March 1889) was an English cricketer who played in one first-class cricket match for Kent County Cricket Club in 1862. He was born and died in Ash next Ridley in Kent.

Elcome played cricket at Stansted and for a number of other clubs in Kent and enjoyed a reputation as a good all-round cricketer. He played for Kent Colts a number of times but made his only senior appearance for the county club against Yorkshire at Bramall Lane in Sheffield in June 1862. He scored eight runs in the first innings opening the batting and finishing as Kent's second highest scorer in the innings as the team was bowled out for 60 runs. He dropped down to number nine in the batting order in the second innings but scored only a single run.

The son of a school teacher, Elcombe worked with his father and was later a bricklayer and publican at Stansted. He married Catherine Goodwin in 1858; the couple had three children. Elcome died in 1889 aged 55.

== Bibliography ==
- Carlaw, Derek (2020). Kent County Cricketers, A to Z: Part One (1806–1914) (PDF). Cardiff: ACS.
