= Albert Birch =

English cricketer (1868–1958)

Albert Edgar Birch (born 11 August 1868) was an English cricketer. He played for Kent County Cricket Club. He was born in Bethnal Green in East London but his date and place of death are uncertain. The cricket website ESPNcricinfo states that he died on 6 November 1936 but does not give a place of death, whilst CricketArchive indicates he died on 11 August 1958 at Hastings in East Sussex. A third source, the UK probate register, states that he died at St Helens Hospital, Hastings, on 1 December 1958.

Birch made two appearances for the Kent Second XI in 1893 and his only first-class cricket appearance the following year for the team against Marylebone Cricket Club (MCC) at Lord's scoring three runs. He appeared once more for Kent Second XI in 1920 in the Minor Counties Championship.

== Bibliography ==
- Carlaw, Derek (2020). Kent County Cricketers, A to Z: Part One (1806–1914) (PDF). Cardiff: ACS.
