= Nick Preston =

English cricketer (born 1972)

Personal information
- Full name: Nicholas William Preston
- Born: 22 January 1972 (age 54); Dartford, Kent
- Batting: Right-handed
- Bowling: Right-arm fast-medium
- Role: Bowler

Domestic team information
- Years: Team
- 1996–1997: Kent
- Source: Cricinfo, 5 April 2014

Nicholas William Preston (born 22 January 1972) is an English former professional cricketer. He played for Kent County Cricket Club

Preston was born at Dartford in Kent and first played for the county's Second XI in 1990. He made his first-class cricket debut for the team in May 1996 and went on to make nine first-class and six List A appearances for the Kent First XI as a seam bowler - all but one of them during 1996. He played once against Cambridge University in 1997 and continued playing for the Second XI until the end of the season before being released by the club. He is married to Mandy Preston and has two children Oliver and Tyla Preston.
