= Tony Woollett =

English cricketer

Personal information
- Full name: Anthony Frank Woollett
- Born: 20 September 1927; Lambeth, London
- Died: 26 January 2004 (aged 76); Wokingham, Berkshire
- Batting: Left-handed
- Role: Batsman

Domestic team information
- Years: Team
- 1950–1954: Kent
- FC debut: 22 July 1950 Kent v Leicestershire
- Last FC: 2 June 1954 Kent v Nottinghamshire

Career statistics
| Competition | First-class |
|---|---|
| Matches | 44 |
| Runs scored | 1,445 |
| Batting average | 18.76 |
| 100s/50s | 0/5 |
| Top score | 96 |
| Catches/stumpings | 16/– |
- Source: Cricinfo, 5 April 2014

Anthony Frank Woollett (20 September 1927 – 26 January 2004) was an English cricketer. He played for Kent County Cricket Club between 1950 and 1954.

Woollett was born at Lambeth in London in 1927. He first played for Kent's Second XI in 1947, and was offered a professional contract by the county at the start of the 1950 season. He made his senior debut for the side during the season in a County Championship match against Leicestershire at Folkestone. An opening batsman, he played in a total of 44 first-class matches for Kent, scoring 1,445 runs.

Although he never made a century in first-class cricket, Woollett's highest score was 96 runs, made against Yorkshire in 1953. The innings, which lasted almost five hours, included partnerships of 111 runs with Arthur Fagg and 138 with Colin Cowdrey. During the season he played in 17 of Kent's matches and scored 698 runs, his highest annual total. Four of his five half-centuries were scored during the season, which Wisden called his best. His highest score for the county Second XI was 212 not out made in 1949 against Wiltshire.

After leaving Kent in 1954, never having established himself as a First XI regular, Woollett played for and coached at Wokingham in Berkshire for more than 40 years. He played three Minor Counties Championship matches for Berkshire County Cricket Club in 1958.

Woollett died in 2004 at Wokingham. He was 76.
