= Peter Nelson (cricketer, born 1918) =

English cricketer

Peter John Mytton Nelson (16 May 1918 – 17 January 1992) was an English amateur cricketer who played in two first-class cricket matches either side of World War II

Nelson was born at Finchley in Middlesex in 1918. He made his first-class debut for Northamptonshire County Cricket Club against Cambridge University in 1938 and played club cricket during the war, including for United Services. He was capped by the Club Cricket Conference in 1943 and played in one first-class match for Kent County Cricket Club against Northants in 1946. He died in 1992, aged 73, at Canterbury in Kent.
