= Charles McVittie =

English cricketer (1908–1973)

Personal information
- Full name: Charles Arthur Blake McVittie
- Born: 30 July 1908; Rugeley, Staffordshire
- Died: 4 September 1973 (aged 65); Stowting Common, Kent
- Batting: Right-handed
- Role: Wicket-keeper

Domestic team information
- Years: Team
- 1929: Cambridge University
- 1929: Kent
- FC debut: 8 May 1929 Cambridge University v Glamorgan
- Last FC: 17 August 1929 Kent v Derbyshire
- Source: CricInfo, 22 December 2020

Charles Arthur Blake McVittie MBE (30 July 1908 – 4 September 1973) was an English amateur cricketer who played in four first-class cricket matches during the 1929 season.

McVittie was born at Rugeley in Staffordshire, the son of Arthur and Margaret McVittie. Both of his parents were born in Shetland, although his paternal grandfather was a surgeon general in the Indian Medical Service and spent much of his working life in India, serving in wars in Afghanistan and Burma. His father was a doctor and the family moved to Aldington in Kent during McVittie's childhood.

McVittie was educated at Bedford School and Caius College, Cambridge, although he was only at Cambridge for four terms and left the university without graduating. He played cricket as a wicket-keeper for his school from 1924 to 1927, heading the school's batting averages in 1925 and 1926 when he was described as Bedford's best batsman "with strokes and a very watchful defence". He was chosen to keep wicket in the annual Rest v Lord's Schools match and for Young Amateurs v Young Professionals in his final year at school and played Second XI cricket for Kent whilst still a schoolboy.

He went up to Cambridge in 1927. He did not win a Blue, but played in three first-class matches for the university during 1929, making his debut against Glamorgan in May. Later the same season he played one County Championship match for Kent County Cricket Club at Dover, having impressed with the bat in Second XI matches.

After having "some success" as a racehorse trainer, McVittie served in the Welsh Guards during World War II. He finished the war as a captain and was awarded an MBE for his war service in north-west Europe. He later worked in the air transport industry. McVittie married Everill Hobbs in 1932; the couple had three children. He died at Stowting Common in Kent in 1973 aged 65.

== Bibliography ==
- Carlaw, Derek (2020). Kent County Cricketers, A to Z: Part Two (1919–1939) (PDF). Cardiff: ACS.
