= George Goldsmith (cricketer) =

English cricketer

Personal information
- Full name: George Goldsmith
- Born: 7 August 1850; Brighton, Sussex
- Died: 5 April 1916 (aged 65); Hanwell, Middlesex
- Batting: Right-handed
- Bowling: Right-arm fast

Domestic team information
- Years: Team
- 1875: Kent
- 1878–1879: Sussex

Career statistics
Competition	First-class
Matches	3
Runs scored	9
Batting average	4.50
100s/50s	0/0
Top score	3*
Balls bowled	144
Wickets	1
Bowling average	71.00
5 wickets in innings	0
10 wickets in match	0
Best bowling	1/38
Catches/stumpings	2/–
- Source: Cricinfo, 10 July 2012

George Goldsmith (7 August 1850 – 5 April 1916) was an English cricketer. Goldsmith was a right-handed batsman who bowled right-arm fast. He was born at Brighton in Sussex and played first-class cricket for both Kent County Cricket Club and Sussex County Cricket Club.

Goldsmith made a single first-class appearance for Kent against Derbyshire in 1875 at Catford. He went on to play two first-class matches for Sussex, one in 1878 and one in 1879. Goldsmith later served as the secretary of Sussex County Cricket Club. He died at Hanwell in Middlesex in April 1916 aged 65.

== Bibliography ==
- Carlaw, Derek (2020). Kent County Cricketers, A to Z: Part One (1806–1914) (PDF). Cardiff: ACS.
