= Edward Sheffield =

English cricketer

Edward James Sheffield (20 June 1908 – 28 April 1971) was an English cricketer who played first-class cricket for Surrey and Kent between 1930 and 1933. He was born at New Eltham in south-east London and died at Chobham in Surrey.

Sheffield was a professional right-arm in-swing fast-medium bowler and a useful right-handed lower-order batsman who had a briefly successful cricket career before he was forced to retire through back injury. He played for Surrey's second eleven in the Minor Counties competition from 1928 and made his first-class debut in 1930. He played regularly for Surrey in 1931 until injury ended his season early and topped the county's bowling averages with 64 wickets at 19.64 runs per wicket; the wickets included a return of seven for 123 against Somerset in his first match of the season which were the best innings figures of his career. He also showed occasional batting ability, including an unbeaten innings of 64 in the game against Essex.

Injury meant that Sheffield's cricket career did not develop from this promising beginning: he played a few games in 1932 but was not re-engaged by Surrey at the end of the season, and in five matches for Kent in 1933 he took only 10 wickets, and did not return for the 1934 season.

== Bibliography ==
- Carlaw, Derek (2020). Kent County Cricketers, A to Z: Part Two (1919–1939) (PDF). Cardiff: ACS.
