= Alan Verrinder =

English cricketer

Personal information
- Full name: Alan Otto Charles Verrinder
- Born: 28 July 1955 (age 71); Henley-on-Thames, Oxfordshire
- Batting: Right-handed
- Bowling: Right-arm fast-medium

Domestic team information
- Years: Team
- 1974–1976: Surrey
- 1977: Kent

Career statistics
Competition	First-class	List A
Matches	4	3
Runs scored	24	2
Batting average	8.00	1.00
100s/50s	0/0	0/0
Top score	23	2
Balls bowled	216	120
Wickets	4	1
Bowling average	36.00	105.00
5 wickets in innings	0	0
10 wickets in match	0	0
Best bowling	2/42	1/43
Catches/stumpings	3/–	0/–
- Source: Cricinfo, 13 August 2011

Alan Otto Charles Verrinder (born 28 July 1955) is an English former cricketer. Verrinder played as a right-handed batsman who bowled right-arm fast-medium. He was born at Henley-on-Thames in Oxfordshire.

Verrinder made his first-class cricket debut for Surrey County Cricket Club against Middlesex in the 1974 County Championship. He made two further first-class appearances for Surrey, both in 1976, and played in three List A matches for the county.

Verrinder joined Kent in 1977, but made just a single first-class appearance against Cambridge University.
