= Charlie Peach =

English cricketer

Personal information
- Full name: Charles William Peach
- Born: 3 January 1900; Egerton, Kent
- Died: 27 February 1977 (aged 77); Coxheath, Kent
- Batting: Right-handed
- Bowling: Right-arm medium-fast
- Role: Bowler
- Relatives: Alan Peach (cousin)

Domestic team information
- Years: Team
- 1930–1931: Kent
- FC debut: 24 May 1930 Kent v Yorkshire
- Last FC: 8 July 1931 Kent v Hampshire

Career statistics
Competition	First-class
Matches	19
Runs scored	108
Batting average	7.20
100s/50s	0/0
Top score	20
Balls bowled	2,561
Wickets	30
Bowling average	27.66
5 wickets in innings	0
10 wickets in match	0
Best bowling	4/38
Catches/stumpings	9/–
- Source: CricInfo, 22 October 2018

Charles William Peach (3 January 1900 – 27 February 1977), known as Charlie Peach, was an English first-class cricketer who played for Kent County Cricket Club in 1930 and 1931. He was born in Egerton in Kent in 1900.

Peach was born at Egerton in Kent, the son of Robert and Eliza Peach. His father was a gamekeeper and came from a family with a cricketing tradition.

Peach was a ground bowler and played for The Mote Cricket Club in Maidstone where one of his cousins was the groundsman. He was "one of the mainstays" of the club's bowling attack for a number of years, and good bowling throughout the late 1920s brought him to the attention of Kent. He made his first-class debut for the county in 1930 against Yorkshire, taking six wickets, but his bowling action was queried throughout his short first-class career and, after playing 17 matches in 1930, he played in only two matches in 1931, although he played for the county Second XI throughout the season. Peach was described in his Wisden obituary as bowling "right-arm, on the quick team of medium" with the ability to "produce a sharp off-break". Despite the suspicions raised about his bowling action he was never no-balled as a result of it in his brief first-class career.

Peach married Dorothy Barker in 1937 and worked as a gamekeeper. He died at Coxheath near Maidstone in 1977 aged 77. His cousin, Alan Peach, made over 300 appearances for Surrey between 1919 and 1931.

== Bibliography ==
- Carlaw, Derek (2020). Kent County Cricketers, A to Z: Part One (1806–1914) (PDF). Cardiff: ACS.
