= Walter Phillips (cricketer) =

English cricketer

Personal information
- Born: 1 April 1881; West Malling, Kent
- Died: 21 June 1948 (aged 67); Mereworth, Kent
- Batting: Right-handed

Domestic team information
- Years: Team
- 1903: Kent
- FC debut: 28 May 1903 Kent v Marylebone Cricket Club (MCC)
- Last FC: 27 June 1912 HDG Leveson's XI v Cambridge University

Career statistics
Competition	First-class
Matches	2
Runs scored	83
Batting average	20.75
100s/50s	0/1
Top score	55
Catches/stumpings	2/–
- Source: CricInfo, 8 June 2022

Walter Phillips (1 April 1881 – 21 June 1948) was an English first-class cricketer.

Phillips was born at West Malling in Kent, the son of Thomas and Elizabeth Lambert Phillips (née Hayward). His father was a farmer, brewer and miller and operated a number of breweries with tied public houses, including the Abbey Brewery in West Malling. Phillips was educated at Eastbourne College where he played cricket for the school XI for two years, scoring 386 runs and taking 66 wickets in 1897, his final year at school.

Phillips worked as a hop factor and played club cricket as a "highly regarded batsman" for Bickley Park, Bromley and The Mote. He played in two first-class matches. In the first, a 1903 fixture for Kent County Cricket Club against Marylebone Cricket Club (MCC) at Lord's, he scored a total of three runs. His other top-level match came in 1912 for HDG Leveson-Gower's XI against Cambridge University at Eastbourne, scoring 55 and 25 runs. He also played 16 Second XI matches for Kent between 1901 and 1911.

In about 1908 Phillips married Beatrice Sanders from Liverpool. He died in 1948 at Mereworth in Kent; he was aged 67.

== Bibliography ==
- Carlaw, Derek (2020). Kent County Cricketers, A to Z: Part One (1806–1914) (PDF). Cardiff: ACS.
