= Elliot Parke =

English cricketer

Elliot Anderson Parke (19 July 1850 – 22 June 1923) was an English amateur cricketer who played in eight first-class cricket matches between 1874 and 1884.

Parke was born at Belgravia in London in 1850 and educated at Harrow School and Oxford University, although he did not play cricket for either his school or for the university. He played mostly for amateur teams such as Marylebone Cricket Club (MCC), Incogniti and Blue Mantles, but made his first-class debut for Kent County Cricket Club in 1874, playing against Derbyshire. Parke's other first-class appearances came between 1879 and 1884, six for MCC and one for the South.

Parke was described in his Wisden obituary as being a "good batsman" and a "fast, round-arm bowler". He scored 110 runs and took one wicket in his eight first-class appearances. He died at his house at Cromwell Park, South Kensington in London in 1923 aged 72.

== Bibliography ==
- Carlaw, Derek (2020). Kent County Cricketers, A to Z: Part One (1806–1914) (PDF). Cardiff: ACS.
