= Frederick Theobold =

English cricketer

Frederick George Theobold (1 February 1839 – 5 January 1888) was an English cricketer.

== Career ==
Theobold was born at New Brompton, part of Chatham, Kent in 1839.

He made his only appearance for the Kent First XI in 1862 against Yorkshire at Bramall Lane in Sheffield, and played in one first-class cricket match for Kent County Cricket Club in 1868.

Theobold died at New Brompton in January 1888 aged 48.

== Bibliography ==
- Carlaw, Derek (2020). Kent County Cricketers, A to Z: Part One (1806–1914) (PDF). Cardiff: ACS.
