= Frank Mellor =

English judge and cricketer

Francis Hamilton Mellor CBE KC (13 May 1854 – 26 April 1925) was an English judge and a cricketer who played in first-class cricket matches for Cambridge University, Kent and the Marylebone Cricket Club between 1874 and 1878. He was born in Bloomsbury, London and died in Paris, France.

== Career ==
Mellor was part of a distinguished legal family: his father was Sir John Mellor, a judge of the Queen's Bench Division of the High Court and among his brothers John William Mellor was Judge Advocate General and a Member of Parliament who became Charman of Ways and Means and Deputy Speaker. Another brother, Sir James Mellor, was Master of the Supreme Court, King's Remembrancer and King's Coroner, and the first registrar of the Court of Criminal Appeal; Frank Mellor was part author of a standard legal work on Crown Office Practice on which his brother James was cited by The Times as "probably the greatest living authority". His nephew, John Paget Mellor, who was John William's son, was Treasury Solicitor and was awarded a baronetcy.

Frank Mellor was educated at Cheltenham College and at Trinity College, Cambridge. Mellor followed the family tradition and became a lawyer: he was called to the bar in 1880 and then practised on the Northern Circuit. He served as a special pleader and was the Recorder of Preston from 1898 to 1911; he was called as a King's Counsel in February 1903 and served as a county court judge in Manchester from 1911 to his death.

He was appointed a Commander of the Order of the British Empire in the 1918 New Year Honours.

He died suddenly after an operation in Paris.

== Cricket ==
He played as a right-handed middle-order batsman and an underarm slow bowler in the Cheltenham cricket team for three seasons and was tried as a lower-order batsman in a single match for Cambridge University in 1874, without success. He returned to the Cambridge first team in 1877 having not progressed beyond the trial matches in the intervening years, and scored 46, his highest in first-class cricket, in his first game back. Despite a modest batting record – and he did not bowl in first-class cricket – Mellor retained his place in the Cambridge eleven and played in the 1877 University Match, scoring 5 and 15 not out as Oxford won the game easily. Later in the 1877 season and also in 1878 he played a couple of games for Kent and he also appeared in 1878 in a match for the Marylebone Cricket Club: in none of these games did he achieve anything of note.

== Bibliography ==
- Carlaw, Derek (2020). Kent County Cricketers, A to Z: Part One (1806–1914) (PDF). Cardiff: ACS.
