= William Sarel (cricketer) =

English cricketer and British Army officer

William Godfrey Molyneux Sarel (15 December 1875 – 5 April 1950) was an English British Army officer and cricketer.

== Career ==
Sarel was born in Dover, and was commissioned in the 3rd (Militia) Battalion of the Queen's (Royal West Surrey Regiment). He saw active service with the battalion in the Second Boer War in South Africa 1899–1900. While in South Africa he transferred to the regular army as a second-lieutenant in the Northumberland Fusilers on 28 August 1901. Following the end of the war in June 1902, Sarel stayed with the 2nd battalion of his regiment, and returned to the United Kingdom on the SS Aurania in early January 1903.

He also served during World War I and died at Whitechapel in London in 1950. He was aged 74.

== Cricket ==
Sarel was active as cricketer from 1904 to 1921 and played for various first-class teams. He appeared in 35 first-class matches as a right-handed batsman who bowled off breaks. He scored 1,313 runs with a highest score of 103 and took three wickets with a best performance of one for 1.

== Bibliography ==
- Carlaw, Derek (2020). Kent County Cricketers, A to Z: Part One (1806–1914) (PDF). Cardiff: ACS.
