= Thomas Hassell =

English cricketer

Personal information
- Born: 1819; Eynesford, Kent
- Died: 1896 (aged 76); Dartford, Kent
- Role: Batsman

Domestic team information
- Years: Team
- 1847: Kent
- Only FC: 29 July 1847 Kent v Sussex
- Source: CricketArchive, 15 May 2024

Thomas Hassell (1819–1896) was an English cricketer who played one match for Kent County Cricket Club in 1847.

Hassell was born at Eynsford in Kent where he was christened in December 1819. He was the son of farmer Thomas Hassell and his wife Ann.

A batsman, Hassell played for Dartford Cricket Club between 1842 and 1844 and for Gravesend Cricket Club between 1845 and 1847, making a score of 58 not out for Gravesend against an Essex XI in 1846. He played for a Gentlemen of Kent team in May 1847, before making his only first-class appearance for Kent against Sussex in June at Tunbridge Wells. Batting last in Kent's first innings he scored nine not out before opening the team's second innings, in which he was dismissed for a single run. The following season he played for a West Kent team against the All England Eleven at Gravesend.

By 1851 Hassell was farming 300 acres (120 ha) at Swanscombe, between Dartford and Gravesend. He married and had three children, but by 1881 was blind and living at nearby Southfleet. He died at Dartford in mid-1896 aged 76. (Note: CricketArchive gives Hassell's place of death as New Zealand; it does not give a date for this and appears to be in error.)

== Bibliography ==
- Carlaw, Derek (2020). Kent County Cricketers, A to Z: Part One (1806–1914) (PDF). Cardiff: ACS.
