= William Bennett (cricketer) =

English cricketer

William Antony Burlton Bennett (25 November 1807 – 20 February 1886) was an English cricketer who played for Marylebone Cricket Club (MCC) between 1832 and 1845 and once for Kent County Cricket Club in 1844. Bennett played twelve matches in all following his debut for The Bs at Lord's in 1831 against an England team. He was born in Calcutta, India, and died in Westminster.

== Bibliography ==
- Carlaw, Derek (2020). Kent County Cricketers, A to Z: Part One (1806–1914) (PDF). Cardiff: ACS.
