= Frederick Atkins (cricketer) =

English cricketer

Personal information
- Full name: Frederick Mark Atkins
- Born: 28 March 1864; Boxley, Kent
- Died: 13 January 1941 (aged 76); Rochester, Kent
- Batting: Left-handed
- Role: Wicket-keeper

Domestic team information
- Years: Team
- 1882–1897: Kent

Career statistics
Competition	First-class
Matches	25
Runs scored	425
Batting average	9.65
100s/50s	0/1
Top score	52
Catches/stumpings	21/1
- Source: CricInfo, 8 March 2017

Frederick Mark Atkins (28 March 1864 – 13 January 1941) was an English cricketer. He played 25 first-class cricket matches for Kent County Cricket Club between 1882 and 1897.

Atkins was born at Boxley near Maidstone in Kent, the son of Mark and Ann Atkins. Both his father and grandfather were Master Maltsters in the brewing industry, and Atkins followed them into the industry, eventually becoming a Master Maltster himself. He played club cricket for The Mote where he was a "prodigious" batsman, becoming the first Mote batsman to score more than 1,000 runs in a season and making a number of high scores, including scoring 364 runs against Shorncliffe Camp in 1887 and 238 against St Lawrence the same season.

He made his Kent debut as an amateur against Marylebone Cricket Club (MCC) at Lord's in 1882 and played sporadically over the next 15 seasons, sometimes as a wicket-keeper. He played generally at his home ground or early in the season when the "top-class" amateurs were often unavailable. Seven appearances in 1894 were the most he played in a season, although he was never able to replicate his batting at club level in the first-class game. He played a "dashing" innings against Essex in a minor match in 1887 and played for the Gentlemen of Kent against the Gentlemen of Philadelphia during the American's tour of Britain in 1889. His final first-class match came in 1897, although he continued to play club cricket until 1909.

Atkins married Elizabeth Houghton and had five children, a son and four daughters. He died at Rochester, Kent in 1941 aged 76.

== Bibliography ==
- Carlaw, Derek (2020). Kent County Cricketers, A to Z: Part One (1806–1914) (PDF). Cardiff: ACS.
