= Amos Bartholomew =

English cricketer

Amos Bartholomew (26 May 1825 – 4 November 1907) was an English cricketer who played in four first-class cricket matches between 1853 and 1864.

Bartholomew was born and died in Sevenoaks in Kent and was employed as a professional cricketer, umpire and groundsman at Sevenoaks Vine and groundsman at Wildernesse, the home of Charles Mills, 1st Baron Hillingdon, near the town. He appeared twice for Kent County Cricket Club, once for a Kent and Sussex XI, and once for England in first-class matches. He had a reputation as a fine player at club level locally. Bartholomew was married and had three children. He died in 1907 aged 82.

== Bibliography ==
- Carlaw, Derek (2020). Kent County Cricketers, A to Z: Part One (1806–1914) (PDF). Cardiff: ACS.
