= Lance Knowles =

English cricketer and cricket administrator

William Lancelot Knowles (27 November 1870 – 1 December 1943) was an English amateur cricketer and cricket administrator. He played mainly for Kent County Cricket Club and was later Secretary of Sussex County Cricket Club for 22 years.

Born at Henfield near Hayward's Heath in Sussex in 1870, Knowles was educated at St John's College at Hurstpierpoint where he played cricket and football and was captain of the school Fives team. He made his first-class cricket debut for Kent in 1892 and was awarded his county cap the same year. He went on to play 34 times for the county, making his final appearance in 1903. He was highly regarded as an amateur batsman, making two centuries, both for Kent in 1900 when his batting average was over 44 runs per innings.

Knowles played one first-class match for Sussex in 1905 but appeared many times for the Gentlemen of Sussex and was heavily involved with the running of the Sussex county club. He was a Justice of the Peace and involved in hunting hares in Sussex. He died at Ditchling in Sussex in 1943 aged 73.

== Bibliography ==
- Carlaw, Derek (2020). Kent County Cricketers, A to Z: Part One (1806–1914) (PDF). Cardiff: ACS.
