= William Palmer (cricketer, born 1847) =

English cricketer

William Thomas Palmer (5 January 1847 – 2 September 1906) was an English professional cricketer who played for Kent County Cricket Club between 1867 and 1870 and Surrey County Cricket Club between 1872 and 1876.

Palmer was born at Canterbury in Kent in 1847. He made his first-class cricket debut for Kent in 1867, going on to play 17 times for the county team before moving to Surrey who he played 19 times for. In total, Palmer played 39 first-class matches, including matches for the United South of England XI and the South.

Palmer died at Southfields in London in September 1906 aged 59.

== Bibliography ==
- Carlaw, Derek (2020). Kent County Cricketers, A to Z: Part One (1806–1914) (PDF). Cardiff: ACS.
