= Lionel Recordon =

English cricketer

Lionel Walther Recordon (25 February 1907 – 6 October 1988) was an English cricketer who played first-class cricket in 11 matches for Kent between 1927 and 1929. He was born at Anerley in south-east London and died at Godalming, Surrey.

Educated at Brighton College where he was captain of the cricket team in 1925, Recordon was a right-handed middle-order batsman and a right-arm leg-break and googly bowler, though he did not take any wickets in his first-class matches. He played county cricket as an amateur. His best innings as a batsman was an unbeaten score of 64 in the match against Northamptonshire in 1928, most of the runs coming in a partnership of 80 in 45 minutes as Kent raced towards a declaration, Recordon hitting three sixes but also being dropped twice.

Recordon continued to play occasional second team matches for Kent to 1932 and was involved in club cricket and wartime matches in London, none of them first-class.

== Bibliography ==
- Carlaw, Derek (2020). Kent County Cricketers, A to Z: Part Two (1919–1939) (PDF). Cardiff: ACS.
