= Bernard Lock =

English cricketer

Bernard Henry Lock (8 June 1915 – 17 December 1997), also known as Bunny Lock, was an English cricketer who played two first-class cricket matches in the 1950s.

Lock was born at Exeter in Devon in 1915 and educated at Sherborne School where he played cricket for the school team in 1932. He won the school prize for fielding, having made his Minor Counties Championship debut for Surrey Second XI in 1928 whilst still at school and later played for Devon County Cricket Club either team of World War II, winning his county cap.

In 1949 Lock made his Second XI debut for Kent County Cricket Club, going on to win his Second XI cap that season and playing regularly for the team until the end of the 1954 season. He played two first-class matches, one for Kent in 1952 and the other for MCC in 1955, both against Oxford University, and returned to play for Devon again in 1957.

Lock died at Dover in Kent in 1997 aged 82.
