= Benjamin Smyth =

English cricketer (1838–1906)

Benjamin Smyth (20 June 1838 – 5 October 1906) was an English first-class cricketer who played one first-class match for Kent County Cricket Club in 1858.

Smyth was born on 20 June 1838, in Calcutta in British India, but lived most of his life in Stockwell. He was educated at Wimbledon Common. Five of his six siblings were also born in India and it is possible that his father was a member of the Indian Civil Service.

Little is known of Smyth's life, although it is believed that he was a member of Surrey County Cricket Club. It is not known how he came to play for Kent in the only cricket match in which he has been identified—a match against Sussex at Hove in which he scored a single run and did not bowl.

It is unclear how Smyth made his living. He may have been a solicitor, although by 1891 he was considered to be independently wealthy. He appears to have married but there is no record of whether he had any children. Smyth died at Clapham on 5 October 1906, aged 68.

== Bibliography ==
- Carlaw, Derek (2020). Kent County Cricketers, A to Z: Part One (1806–1914) (PDF). Cardiff: ACS.
