= Henry Sutherland =

English cricketer and British Army officer

- Born: 17 September 1899; Croydon, Surrey
- Died: 4 August 1963 (aged 63); St Leonards-on-Sea, Sussex
- Military career
- Allegiance: United Kingdom
- Branch: British Army
- Service years: 1866–1884
- Rank: Captain
- Unit: King's Own Royal Regiment (Lancaster)
- Conflicts: Anglo-Zulu War

Henry Boyd Sutherland (4 December 1844 – 27 August 1915) was an English officer in the British Army during the 19th century who played in two first-class cricket matches as an amateur in the early 1870s.

Sutherland was born at Croydon in Surrey in 1844, the son of John and Mary Sutherland. His father owned land and was a Deputy Lieutenant of Surrey and Sutherland was educated at Eton College where he was in the cricket XI between 1861 and 1863. After leaving school he initially planned to work in the law before choosing to join the British Army in June 1866, commissioned as an ensign serving in the 4th battalion, The King's Own Royal Regiment. After initially serving in Canada at the Halifax Citadel in Nova Scotia, Sutherland was promoted to lieutenant in 1870 and captain in 1879 before retiring from the army in 1884. He served in the Anglo-Zulu War in 1879 as the garrison adjutant at Maritzburg and, after an accident at the base, was invalided home. He was awarded the South Africa Medal.

Throughout his time in the army, Sutherland played cricket. He played for Cheshire and the Gentlemen of Cheshire whilst stationed at Chester between 1869 and 1871 and played regularly for the Eton Ramblers and, from 1873, for I Zingari. He was stationed at Aldershot and the Royal Arsenal at Woolwich in the south of England between 1871 and 1874. During this time he played in two first-class cricket matches, first appearing for Kent County Cricket Club against the Gentlemen of the Marylebone Cricket Club (MCC) during the 1871 Canterbury Cricket Week and then, in 1883, appearing against Kent in the same fixture.

Sutherland married Harriett Jennings in 1889 but had no children. He died at St Leonards-on-Sea in Sussex in August 1915 aged 70.

== Bibliography ==
- Carlaw, Derek (2020). Kent County Cricketers, A to Z: Part One (1806–1914) (PDF). Cardiff: ACS.
