= Robert Armstrong (cricketer) =

English cricketer

Personal information
- Full name: Robert George Chadwick Armstrong
- Born: 12 August 1836; Gravesend, Kent, England
- Died: 9 June 1863 (aged 26); Peckham, Surrey, England
- Batting: Right-handed

Domestic team information
- Years: Team
- 1859–1861: Kent

Career statistics
Competition	First-class
Matches	9
Runs scored	76
Batting average	6.90
100s/50s	0/0
Top score	10*
Balls bowled	44
Wickets	0
Bowling average	–
5 wickets in innings	–
10 wickets in match	–
Best bowling	–
Catches/stumpings	3/–
- Source: CricInfo, 2 January 2012

Robert George Chadwick Armstrong (12 August 1836 – 9 June 1863) was an English cricketer. He was born at Gravesend, Kent and played nine times for Kent County Cricket Club between 1859 and 1861.

Armstrong was the son of Samuel Francis and Agnes Armstrong. His father was a Lieutenant in the Royal Artillery and as a young man Robert played cricket for Gravesend and in the Peckham Rye area where he lived for most of his life.

He made his first-class cricket debut for Kent against Middlesex at Southgate in 1859, making a pair on debut. Armstrong went on to make total of nine first-class appearances for the county, (Note: Three of Armstrong's appearances were in Kent teams with 15 or 16 players, all against England XIs. These matches are not considered first-class by Kent County Cricket Club sources but are accepted as first-class by other sources.) the last of which came against England in 1861. He was considered a batsman with "good style" who had once promised "future excellence" but in his 13 innings only once made a double figure score, 10 not out against an England XI at Lord's in 1860. He was considered "slow" as a fielder.

Armstrong played for a range of other teams in other matches, including for United and All England teams a number of times. He died of tuberculosis at Peckham in what was then Surrey in June 1863 aged 26.

== Bibliography ==
- Carlaw, Derek (2020). Kent County Cricketers, A to Z: Part One (1806–1914) (PDF). Cardiff: ACS.
