= William Tomson =

English cricketer

Personal information
- Born: 18 May 1842; Ramsgate, Kent
- Died: 12 June 1882 (aged 40); Ramsgate, Kent

Domestic team information
- Years: Team
- 1861: Kent

Career statistics
| Competition | First-class |
|---|---|
| Matches | 1 |
| Runs scored | 2 |
| Batting average | 2.00 |
| 100s/50s | 0/0 |
| Top score | 2 |
| Catches/stumpings | 1/– |
- Source: Cricinfo, 27 June 2014

William Fox Tomson (18 May 1842 – 12 June 1882) was an English cricketer active in 1861. He was born at Ramsgate, Kent.

He made one appearance in first-class cricket for Kent against England at Lord's in 1861. He batted once in the match, scoring 2 runs before he was dismissed by Billy Caffyn, as well as taking a single catch in England's first-innings, with Kent winning the match by an innings and 74 runs.

Tomson died at the town of his birth on 12 June 1882.

== Bibliography ==
- Carlaw, Derek (2020). Kent County Cricketers, A to Z: Part One (1806–1914) (PDF). Cardiff: ACS.
