= Leon Hellmuth =

English cricketer

Personal information
- Full name: Leon Hellmuth
- Born: 14 August 1934; Blackheath, London
- Died: 29 December 1981 (aged 47); Sidcup, London Borough of Bexley
- Batting: Left-handed
- Bowling: Slow left-arm orthodox

Domestic team information
- Years: Team
- 1951–1952: Kent
- FC debut: 28 July 1951 Kent v Essex
- Last FC: 9 August 1952 Kent v Leicestershire

Career statistics
Competition	First-class
Matches	7
Runs scored	34
Batting average	2.83
100s/50s	0/0
Top score	11
Balls bowled	934
Wickets	8
Bowling average	47.87
5 wickets in innings	0
10 wickets in match	0
Best bowling	2/11
Catches/stumpings	8/–
- Source: CricInfo, 5 February 2012

Leon Hellmuth (14 August 1934 – 29 December 1981) was an English cricketer who played first-class cricket for Kent County Cricket Club in 1951 and 1952. He was born at Blackheath, London in 1934.

Hellmuth, who was described by The Times in 1952 as "a batsman of undoubted promise", made his first-class debut for Kent against Essex in the 1951 County Championship at Blackheath. He made a total of seven First XI appearances for the county, all of which came, other than his debut, in 1952, with his final first-class match being against Leicestershire. Hellmuth played 34 matches for the Kent Second XI in the Minor Counties Championship between 1951 and 1955.

He died at Sidcup in the London Borough of Bexley in December 1981 aged 47.
