= Robert Rumsey =

English cricketer

Personal information
- Full name: Robert Edwin Rumsey
- Born: 17 February 1844; Greenwich, Kent
- Died: 12 June 1884 (aged 40); Greenwich, Kent
- Batting: Right-handed
- Bowling: Right-arm fast

Domestic team information
- Years: Team
- 1875: Kent

Career statistics
Competition	First-class
Matches	3
Runs scored	20
Batting average	5.00
100s/50s	0/0
Top score	13
Balls bowled	300
Wickets	7
Bowling average	20.00
5 wickets in innings	1
10 wickets in match	0
Best bowling	5/48
Catches/stumpings	2/–
- Source: Cricinfo, 4 May 2013

Robert Edwin Rumsey (17 February 1844 – 12 June 1884) was an English professional cricketer who played in three first-class cricket matches in 1875.

Rumsey was born at Greenwich, then in Kent, in 1875 the son of Robert and Phoebe Rumsey. His father was an engineer working at John Penn and Sons in Deptford. Robert joined the same company and spent his working life as a pattern maker. He captained the company cricket team and by the 1870s was supplementing his income by working as a coach, first at Southgate and later at Gore Court in Sittingbourne.

Rumsey played in Colts matches for Kent teams in 1874 and made his senior debut for Kent County Cricket Club against Hampshire at Catford in 1875, taking a five-wicket haul on debut. He made two further first-class appearances for Kent in the same season, against Derbyshire and Surrey, taking a further two wickets. Rumsey continued to play club cricket, including for a Players of Kent XI in 1876, and appeared at least twice for the United South of England Eleven.

Rumsey married Emily Malyon in 1866; the couple had two children. He died after an illness in 1884 at Greenwich aged 40.

== Bibliography ==
- Carlaw, Derek (2020). Kent County Cricketers, A to Z: Part One (1806–1914) (PDF). Cardiff: ACS.
