= Richard Palmer (cricketer) =

English cricketer

Richard Palmer (13 September 1848 – 2 March 1939) was an English professional cricketer who played for Kent County Cricket Club between 1873 and 1883.

Palmer was born at Hadlow in Kent in 1848. (Note: Palmer's Wisden autobiography gives his date of birth as 13 September 1850. Both CricInfo and CricketArchive give it as 13 September 1848.) In 1871 he was employed as a professional player at Fenner's a role he was recommended for by William Yardley, the Cambridge University captain.

Palmer made his first-class cricket debut for Kent in 1873. He played occasionally for the county between then and 1876 and made two further appearances in 1882 for the county team, making a total of 13 first-class appearances for the county team. He was described in his Wisden obituary as a "good batsman" who generally played as a wicket-keeper. He collected six wicket-keeping dismissals in a match against Marylebone Cricket Club (MCC) during the 1875 Canterbury Cricket Week. Palmer went on to play for Staffordshire in five minor matches in 1886.

Palmer died at Lower Halstow near Sittingbourne in 1939 aged 90.

== Bibliography ==
- Carlaw, Derek (2020). Kent County Cricketers, A to Z: Part One (1806–1914) (PDF). Cardiff: ACS.
