= Robert Minns =

English cricketer (born 1940)

Personal information
- Full name: Robert Ernest Frederick Minns
- Born: 18 November 1940 (age 85); Penang, Malaya
- Batting: Right-handed

Domestic team information
- Years: Team
- 1959–1963: Kent
- 1962–1963: Oxford University
- Source: Cricinfo, 5 April 2014

Robert Ernest Frederick Minns (born 18 November 1940) is an English former cricketer who made 20 appearances in first-class cricket matches between 1959 and 1963.

Minns was born in British Malaya and educated in England at The King's School, Canterbury in Kent. He made his first-class cricket debut for Kent County Cricket Club in July 1959 against Leicestershire at Maidstone, also playing several times for Kent's Second XI during the summer. Minns went up to Corpus Christi College, Oxford and his next first-class match was for Oxford University in 1962. He won blues in both 1962 and 1963 and played 18 times for the university in first-class matches over the two years.

Minns' final first-class appearance was for Kent later in 1963. In total he played in 20 first-class matches, of which two were for the county team and 18 for the university.
