= William Meers =

English cricketer

William Simmonds Meers (27 March 1844 – 12 July 1902) was an English amateur cricketer who played in one first-class cricket match for Kent County Cricket Club.

Meers was born at Stoke in Kent in 1844. He made his only appearance for the Kent team in 1866 against Sussex at Tunbridge Wells. He is also known to have played two matches for the Gentlemen of Kent during the 1860s. He died at Horsham in Sussex in 1902 aged 58.

== Bibliography ==
- Carlaw, Derek (2020). Kent County Cricketers, A to Z: Part One (1806–1914) (PDF). Cardiff: ACS.
