= Edward Tootell =

English cricketer and surgeon

Edward Tootell (22 November 1849 – 20 March 1878) was an English surgeon and amateur cricketer. He was born at Thurnham near Maidstone in Kent in 1849, the son of Joseph Tootell, a land agent and auctioneer.

Tootell played in three first-class cricket matches for Kent County Cricket Club in 1872. He is known to have played for The Mote and the Gentlemen of Kent in minor matches between 1867 and 1870.

Professionally Tootell became a surgeon and served with the British Army in India. He died after contracting typhoid at Mitri in Sind province in March 1878 aged 28.

== Bibliography ==
- Carlaw, Derek (2020). Kent County Cricketers, A to Z: Part One (1806–1914) (PDF). Cardiff: ACS.
