= William Hammond (cricketer) =

English American cricketer

William Hammond (birth and death dates unknown) was a nineteenth century English amateur cricketer who briefly played first-class cricket between 1855 and 1857, before emigrating to the United States. Born in Maidstone in Kent, Hammond made his first-class debut at Lord's in July 1855 for a Gentlemen of Kent and Surrey XI against a Gentleman of England XI. He represented the Gentlemen of Kent and Surrey again in August that same year. He then went on to make his only appearance for Kent County Cricket Club in June 1857 against Surrey.

Hammond enjoyed a substantial career in club cricket, playing for clubs in Maidstone before emigration to the United States in 1859 led to him representing Germantown, an English Resident's XI, the Philadelphian cricket team, the Boston cricket club and the fledgling United States cricket team. He died in Brooklyn, New York City.

== Bibliography ==
- Carlaw, Derek (2020). Kent County Cricketers, A to Z: Part One (1806–1914) (PDF). Cardiff: ACS.
