= John Byass =

English cricketer (1854–1936)

Personal information
- Full name: John Edmund Byass
- Born: 8 May 1854; Upper Clapton, London, England
- Died: 6 June 1936 (aged 82); Shepparton, Victoria, Australia
- Batting: Right-handed
- Source: Cricinfo, 9 March 2017

John Edmund Byass (8 May 1854 – 6 June 1936) was an English first-class cricketer of the 1870s who later lived in Australia.

Byass was educated at Christ College, Finchley. He played four first-class matches for Kent between 1874 and 1876.

Byass and his wife Alice migrated to Australia in 1876, first settling in Melbourne, then moving in 1885 to Shepparton, where he had purchased a business as an auctioneer and estate agent. He was appointed secretary of the Shepparton Agricultural Society in 1892, and served in that position for 36 years. He was secretary of the Shepparton Urban Waterworks Trust from 1897 until his death in 1936. Alice had died in 1927. They had four daughters.

== Bibliography ==
- Carlaw, Derek (2020). Kent County Cricketers, A to Z: Part One (1806–1914) (PDF). Cardiff: ACS.
