= William Best (cricketer) =

English cricketer

Personal information
- Full name: William Finlay Best
- Born: 30 May 1865; Smarden, Kent
- Died: 3 August 1942 (aged 77); Ruthin Castle, Denbighshire
- Batting: Right-handed
- Bowling: Right-arm slow

Domestic team information
- Years: Team
- 1890–1892: Kent
- FC debut: 10 July 1890 Kent v Notts
- Last FC: 13 June 1892 Kent v Yorkshire
- Source: CricInfo, 21 December 2020

William Finlay Best (30 May 1865 – 3 August 1942) was an English cricketer who played in five first-class cricket matches for Kent County Cricket Club between 1890 and 1892.

Best was born in Smarden in Kent, the son of a farmer originally from County Durham. He was educated at Grove House School at Folkestone and made his living as a hop factor, sourcing hops for the brewing industry. He spent his working life based largely in Lancashire and played cricket for Preston Cricket Club between 1890 and 1905, scoring more than 10,000 runs and taking almost 600 wickets for the club.

He made his first-class debut for Kent in 1890 and Trent Bridge against Nottinghamshire. He played twice in 1890 and only once in 1891 when he took a hat-trick against Somerset at Taunton, his first wickets in senior cricket. He played for Kent only twice more, both matches in 1892 when he made his highest first-class score of 26 runs against Lancashire at Old Trafford and took two ore wickets against Yorkshire at Bradford. Four or his five matches came away from Kent's home grounds, the exception being his second appearance for the county which was at Tonbridge.

Best married Ellen Westwell in 1892. He suffered from mitral valvular disease and died in hospital at Ruthin Castle in Denbighshire in 1942 aged 77.

== Bibliography ==
- Carlaw, Derek (2020). Kent County Cricketers, A to Z: Part One (1806–1914) (PDF). Cardiff: ACS.
