= James Mewett =

English cricketer

James Mewett (c. 1833 – 2 November 1904) was an English cricketer who played in one first-class cricket match for Kent County Cricket Club in 1860.

Mewett was born at Eastbourne in Sussex in 1833. He is known to have played for Tunbridge Wells Cricket Club between 1858 and 1860 and made his only first-class appearance for Kent against England at Lord's in 1860, a match in which Kent fielded 16 players. He died at Sandhurst in Kent in 1904.

== Bibliography ==
- Carlaw, Derek (2020). Kent County Cricketers, A to Z: Part One (1806–1914) (PDF). Cardiff: ACS.
