= James Howgego =

English cricketer (born 1948)

James Alan Howgego (born 3 August 1948), known as Jim Howgego, was an English cricketer who played in one first-class cricket match for Kent County Cricket Club during the 1977 season. He was born in Folkestone in Kent in 1948.

Howgego played for Folkestone Cricket Club in the Kent Cricket League and Kent's Second XI occasionally between 1975 and 1979, making ten appearances in the Second XI Championship. His only first-class appearance came against Cambridge University in June 1977 at Canterbury. He toured the West Indies with the Club Cricket Conference in 1977 and was capped by the team and appeared occasionally for teams such as MCC in non-first-class matches. Howgego was the Kent League's player of the year in 1987 and when the league was restructured in 1990 Howgego was left as the leading all-time run scorer in First XI cricket in the league's history.

His cousin, Graham Barlow, won three Test caps for England.
