= Alfred Hoppe =

English cricketer (1830–1919)

Personal information
- Born: 6 June 1830; Aldgate, Middlesex
- Died: 15 April 1919 (aged 88); Cobham, Kent

Domestic team information
- Years: Team
- 1854: Kent

Career statistics
Competition	First-class
Matches	2
Runs scored	8
Batting average	2.00
100s/50s	0/0
Top score	8
Balls bowled	24
Wickets	0
Bowling average	–
5 wickets in innings	–
10 wickets in match	–
Best bowling	–
Catches/stumpings	2/–
- Source: ESPNcricinfo, 30 August 2014

Alfred Hoppe (6 June 1830 – 15 April 1919) was an English amateur cricketer who played in two first-class cricket matches in the 1850s. He was born at Aldgate in Middlesex.

Hoppe made his first-class debut for Kent County Cricket Club, playing against a United England Eleven at Gravesend in 1854. His final appearance was for the Gentlemen of Kent and Sussex against the Gentlemen of England at Lord's in 1857. He played club cricket for Town Malling Cricket Club in Kent between 1849 and 1874.

Hoppe died at Cobham in Kent in April 1919 aged 88.

== Bibliography ==
- Carlaw, Derek (2020). Kent County Cricketers, A to Z: Part One (1806–1914) (PDF). Cardiff: ACS.
