= Francis Street (cricketer) =

English cricketer

Personal information
- Full name: Francis Edward Street
- Born: 16 February 1851; Hampstead, Middlesex, England
- Died: 4 June 1928 (aged 77); Armidale, New South Wales, Australia
- Batting: Right-handed

Domestic team information
- Years: Team
- 1875–1877: Kent

Career statistics
Competition	First-class
Matches	4
Runs scored	21
Batting average	3.00
100s/50s	0/0
Top score	12
Catches/stumpings	2/–
- Source: Cricinfo, 26 June 2014

Francis Edward Street (16 February 1851 – 4 June 1928) was an English cricketer who played in four first-class matches for Kent County Cricket Club during the mid-1870s. He was a right-handed batsman who played regular club cricket.

Street was born at Hampstead in Middlesex in 1851, the son of Henry and Jane Street. His father was a solicitor. Street was educated at Uppingham School where he played cricket in the school team. He played club cricket for Uppingham Rovers in the 1880s, and for other amateur teams such as Beckenham, Free Foresters, Incogniti, and Marylebone Cricket Club (MCC).

Living for a time at Brasted in Kent, he made his first-class debut for Kent in 1875 against Derbyshire, making two further appearances the same year against Sussex and playing in the return match against Derbyshire. He played his final first-class appearance in 1877 against Nottinghamshire. Street had little success in his four appearances, scoring just 21 runs, with a high score of 12. He was described in Scores and Biographies as "A promising bat and good field, generally taking long-leg or cover-point."

Street worked as a chartered accountant. He married Sarah Partridge in 1883; the couple had five children. He died at Armidale, New South Wales in 1928 aged 77 whilst visiting Australia.

== Bibliography ==
- Carlaw, Derek (2020). Kent County Cricketers, A to Z: Part One (1806–1914) (PDF). Cardiff: ACS.
