= Norman Harding (cricketer) =

English cricketer

Personal information
- Full name: Norman Walter Harding
- Born: 19 March 1916; Woolston, Hampshire
- Died: 25 September 1947 (aged 31); Abingdon-on-Thames, Berkshire
- Batting: Right-handed
- Bowling: Right-arm fast
- Role: Bowler

Domestic team information
- Years: Team
- 1934–1945: Berkshire
- 1937–1947: Kent
- FC debut: 18 August 1937 Kent v Gloucestershire
- Last FC: 27 August 1947 Kent v South Africans

Career statistics
Competition	First-class
Matches	84
Runs scored	966
Batting average	9.56
100s/50s	0/2
Top score	71
Balls bowled	11,958
Wickets	229
Bowling average	28.51
5 wickets in innings	9
10 wickets in match	1
Best bowling	5/31
Catches/stumpings	55/–
- Source: CricInfo, 23 October 2017

Norman Walter Harding (19 March 1916 – 25 September 1947) was an English cricketer who played first-class cricket for Kent County Cricket Club from 1937 until shortly before his death in 1947. He died in Abingdon-on-Thames.

Harding was born at Woolston, Hampshire near Southampton in 1916 and educated at Reading School in Berkshire. He played for Berkshire County Cricket Club between 1934 and 1936, including making 16 appearances in the Minor Counties Championship and moved to play professionally at Kent in the 1937 season. In his first competitive match for Kent, a Second XI fixture against Wiltshire, he took 18 wickets, nine in each Wiltshire innings, a feat Wisden describes as "extraordinary" and "regarded as unique in county cricket".

He made his first-class debut for the county in August 1937 against Gloucestershire at Dover, going on to make 83 first-class appearances for Kent, playing regularly after his first season. During World War II Harding played some club cricket in the Lancashire League for Rishton Cricket Club in 1941, and appeared for an Anti-Aircraft Commandteam and an England XI in 1943. He made three appearances for Berkshire in matches during 1945, and played for the Under 33s in one of the eleven first-class matches possible in England after the end of the war before rejoining Kent in 1946.

Harding was considered to be a key member of Kent's bowling attack before and after the war. He took 69 wickets in 1939 and 68 in 1947 and was perhaps the fastest Kent bowler since Bill Bradley who had bowled at the turn of the century. He died in the 1947 polio epidemic which swept the United Kingdom after less than a week in hospital at Abingdon-on-Thames. He was 31.

== Bibliography ==
- Carlaw, Derek (2020). Kent County Cricketers, A to Z: Part Two (1919–1939) (PDF). Cardiff: ACS.
