= Graham Johnson (cricketer, born 1946) =

English cricketer and business executive

Personal information
- Full name: Graham William Johnson
- Born: 8 November 1946 (age 80); Beckenham, Kent
- Batting: Right-handed
- Bowling: Right-arm off-break
- Role: All-rounder

Domestic team information
- Years: Team
- 1965–1985: Kent
- 1981/82: Transvaal
- 1984/85: Transvaal B
- FC debut: 15 May 1965 Kent v Northants
- Last FC: 13 July 1985 Kent v Northants
- LA debut: 1 June 1969 Kent v Surrey
- Last LA: 14 July 1985 Kent v Northants

Career statistics
Competition	First-class	List A
Matches	390	303
Runs scored	12,922	5,666
Batting average	24.51	24.52
100s/50s	11/55	1/25
Top score	168	120*
Balls bowled	41.007	3,513
Wickets	567	105
Bowling average	31.04	23.07
5 wickets in innings	23	1
10 wickets in match	3	0
Best bowling	7/76	5/26
Catches/stumpings	315/–	114/–
- Source: CricInfo, 20 August 2014

Graham William Johnson (born 8 November 1946) is a former English cricketer and business executive. He played for Kent County Cricket Club between 1965 and 1985 and was later the chairman of the club's Cricket Committee. He was born in Beckenham in 1946.

Johnson made his first-class cricket debut in 1965 and won his county cap in 1970. He was a versatile batsman and off-spin bowler who featured in a strong Kent team which won four County Championships and a number of limited overs trophies during his time with the club. He was vice-captain of the Kent team under Mike Denness.

A graduate of the London School of Economics, Johnson had a successful business career with Barclays Bank, Save and Prosper, Flemings, Egg and Prudential. He has been a director of TAL Talent Ltd, a specialist search, recruitment, assessment and people development company.

Johnson has also been active with the Lord's Taverners both on its Cricket Committee and as a player. He succeeded Denness as Chairman of the Kent Cricket Committee in 2004 and served as Kent President in 2014.
