= 1910 in the United Kingdom =

Events from the year 1910 in the United Kingdom. This year sees a change of monarch.

== Incumbents ==
- Monarch - Edward VII (until 6 May), George V (starting 6 May)
- Prime Minister – H. H. Asquith (Liberal)

== Events ==
- January – Cinematograph Act 1909 comes into effect providing for licensing of cinemas by local authorities.
- 15 January – A general election held in response to the House of Lords' rejection of the 1909 budget results in a reduced Liberal Party majority (Liberals, 275 seats; Labour, 40; Irish Nationalists, 82; Unionists (the title preferred at this time by the Conservative Party), 273).
- 31 January – Dr. Crippen poisons his wife and buries her body in the cellar of their London home.
- 1 February – The first labour exchanges open in the UK.
- 7 February – Dreadnought hoax: Horace de Vere Cole and members of the Bloomsbury Group make an "official visit" to the battleship HMS Dreadnought at Portland Harbour in disguise as a royal delegation from Abyssinia.
- 15 February – The Royal Aero Club is granted its "Royal" prefix.
- 19 February – Old Trafford, the largest football stadium in England with an 80,000 capacity, is opened. Manchester United's first game there is a 4–3 home defeat to Liverpool in the Football League First Division.
- March – King Edward VII falls very ill with bronchitis in France, returning to London a few weeks later.
- 31 March – Federation of Stoke-on-Trent: Administrative amalgamation of the six towns of The Potteries in north Staffordshire (Stoke-upon-Trent, Burslem, Tunstall, Hanley, Fenton and Longton) into the single county borough of Stoke-on-Trent, the first such merger in the history of local government in England.
- April – It is reported that King Edward VII's health has deteriorated further and he is likely to die soon.
- 4 April – A bill to abolish the legislative veto of the House of Lords is introduced in the House of Commons, starting a prolonged clash between the two Houses of Parliament.
- 27 April – The House of Commons passes David Lloyd George's (1909) 'People's Budget' for the second time; it is passed by House of Lords on 29 April.
- 28 April – Frenchman Louis Paulhan completes the Daily Mail's 1910 London to Manchester air race in under 24 hours; the other competitor, Claude Grahame-White, is forced to retire.
- 6 May – George V succeeds to the British throne as King on the death of his father, Edward VII, at Buckingham Palace.
- 11 May – A firedamp explosion at Wellington Colliery, Whitehaven, in the Cumberland Coalfield, kills 136. 64 Edward Medals are awarded to rescuers.
- 20 May – Funeral of Edward VII held, one of the largest and last gatherings of European royalty to take place, following the first public lying in state in Westminster Hall.
- 2 June – Charles Rolls becomes the first man to make a non-stop double crossing of the English Channel by plane, including the first eastbound flight. He is also the first British resident to make the crossing in a British-built plane.
- 15 June – Terra Nova Expedition: Robert Falcon Scott's ship Terra Nova sets sail from Cardiff on an expedition with the purpose of undertaking scientific research and exploration along the coast and interior of Antarctica.
- 14–23 June – Edinburgh Missionary Conference is held in Scotland, presided over by Nobel Peace Prize recipient John R. Mott, launching the modern ecumenical movement and the modern missions movement.
- 21 June – Truro Cathedral, Cornwall, completed.
- 28 June – Consecration of the Roman Catholic Westminster Cathedral in London.
- July – First Girl Guide troops registered, under the supervision of Agnes Baden-Powell.
- 9–10 July – 'Fowler's match': the Eton v Harrow cricket match at Lord's, known after the captain of Eton College, Robert St Leger Fowler, and described as "what might just be the greatest cricket match of all time".
- 12 July – Charles Rolls becomes the first British aviation fatality when his French-built Wright aeroplane suffers a broken rudder at an altitude of 80 feet (24 meters) and crashes during a contest at Bournemouth.
- 29 July – In a legal cause célèbre, the Crown drops its charge against naval cadet George Archer-Shee for stealing a postal order.
- 31 July – Dr. Crippen is arrested on board the SS Montrose after a telegraph is sent to the ship's captain.

Fantasia on a Theme by Thomas Tallis
Ralph Vaughan Williams' Fantasia on a Theme by Thomas Tallis (1910), performed by the U.S. Army Band Strings.

- 1 September – Ninian Park football stadium is opened in Cardiff, to serve Cardiff City F.C., who are members of the English Football League despite being based in Wales.
- 6 September – Vaughan Williams' string orchestral work Fantasia on a Theme by Thomas Tallis is premiered under the composer's baton at Gloucester Cathedral for the Three Choirs Festival.
- 11 September – English-born actor-aviator Robert Loraine makes an aeroplane flight from Wales across the Irish Sea, landing some 200 feet (61 metres) short of the Irish coast in Dublin Bay.
- 5 October – Portugal becomes a republic; King Manuel II flees to England.
- 18 October
  - Dr. Crippen put on trial for murder at the Old Bailey.
  - First B-type double-decker bus, built and operated by the London General Omnibus Company, enters service. Designed by Frank Searle and considered the first mass-produced bus, around 2,800 are built up to 1919, displacing LGOC's last horse-drawn buses by the end of 1911 and with examples in regular use up to 1926, about 900 seeing service on the Western Front (World War I).

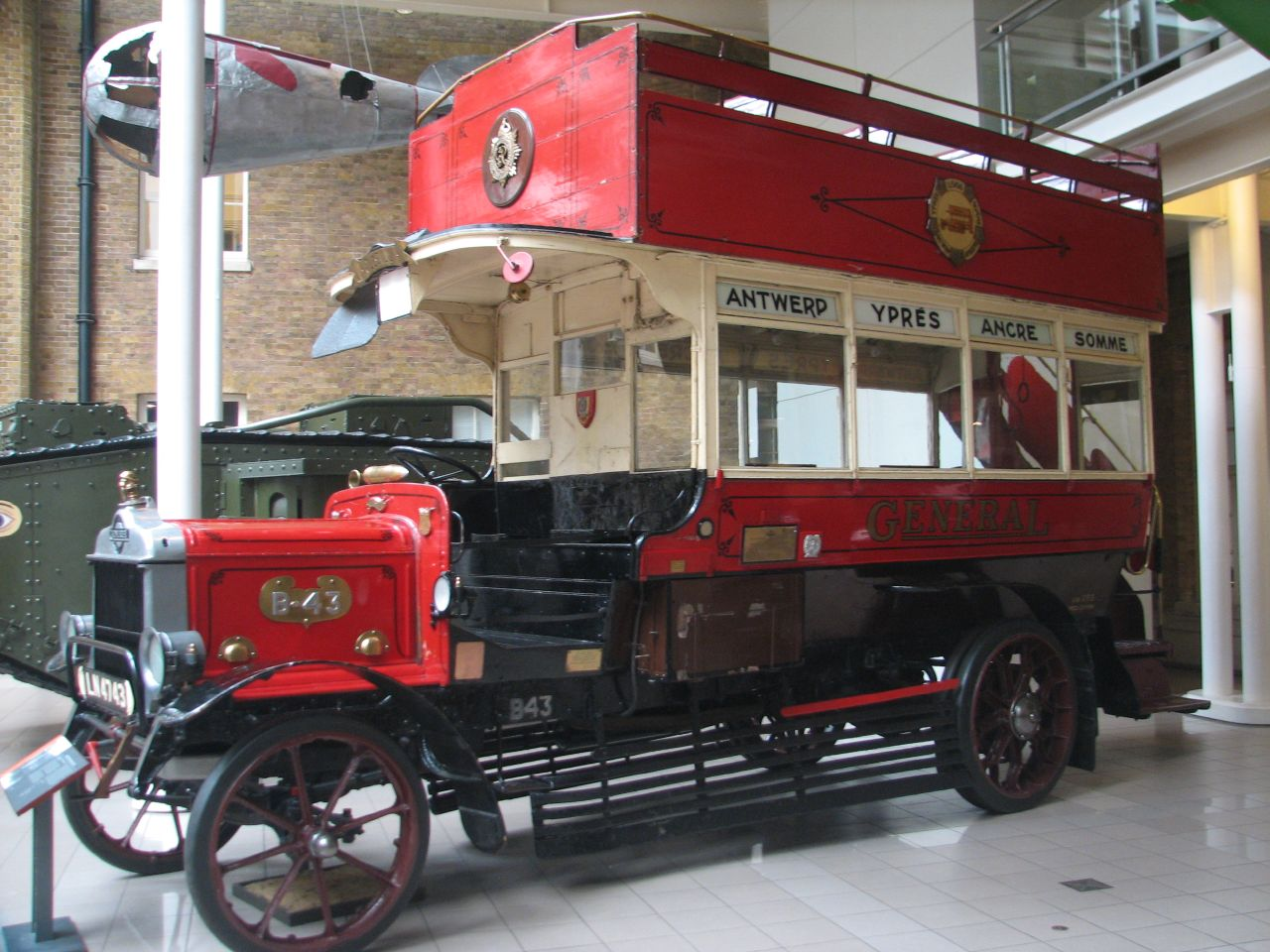
Early LGOC B-type

- 20 October – RMS Olympic is launched at the Harland and Wolff Shipyards in Belfast.
- 22 October
  - Dr. Crippen found guilty of murder and sentenced to death.
  - Women chainmakers of Cradley Heath in the Black Country, led by Mary Macarthur, win a minimum wage following a ten-week strike; this effectively doubles their pay.
- November – Education (Choice of Employment) Act establishes the school careers service.
- 1 November – Coal miners are balloted for strike action by the South Wales Miners' Federation following a lock-out, resulting in 12,000 men working for the Cambrian Combine beginning a 10-month strike.
- 7–8 November – Conflict between striking miners and police forces in the Rhondda, South Wales, leads to the Tonypandy riots.
- 8 November–15 January 1911 – Manet and the Post-Impressionists exhibition at the Grafton Galleries in London, organised by Roger Fry, introduces the term Post-Impressionism.
- 18 November – Black Friday: 300 suffragettes clash with police outside Parliament over the failure of the Conciliation Bill.
- 23 November – Dr. Crippen hanged at Pentonville Prison, London.
- 26 November – Suffragist Hugh Franklin attempts to whip Winston Churchill, the Home Secretary, on a train over the police treatment of suffragettes.
- 3–19 December – The second general election of 1910 is held for the electorate to resolve the battle of wills between the Houses of Commons and the House of Lords. The results are: Liberals, 272; Labour, 42; Irish Nationalists, 84; Unionists, 272 – making a majority of 126 for restriction of the powers of the Lords and for Irish Home Rule. This will be the last UK general election before the end of World War I, the last on which regular voting extends over several days, the last in which only men can vote, and the last in which a party other than the Conservatives or Labour will gain a majority of seats.
- 16 December – In Houndsditch, London, four (Latvian) anarchists shoot three policemen in a botched raid on a jewellers – three are arrested, other members of the gang escape but are later (January 1911) cornered in the 'siege of Sidney Street'.
- 21 December – The Pretoria Pit disaster: a massive underground explosion in a colliery belonging to the Hulton Colliery Company at Westhoughton in Lancashire, kills 344, with just one survivor, the second-worst mining accident in England and the third-worst in Britain.
- 25 December – Suffragette Mary Jane Clarke (Emmeline Pankhurst's sister, b. 1862) dies in London from a brain hemorrhage two days after being released from prison, where she had been force-fed, "the first woman martyr who has gone to death for this cause".
- 26 December – London Palladium music hall opens.

=== Undated ===
- Autumn – Charlie Chaplin and Stan Jefferson, later known as Stan Laurel, embark from Southampton on the same ship, SS Cairnrona, on their first trip to North America, as part of Fred Karno's comedy troupe.
- Bamforths of Holmfirth begin publishing 'saucy' seaside postcards.
- New Birmingham Oratory building completed.
- Admiralty Arch in London completed.

== Publications ==
- Arnold Bennett's novel Clayhanger, first in The Clayhanger Family series set in the Staffordshire Potteries.
- John Buchan's novel Prester John.
- Gilbert Cannan's novel Devious Ways.
- Jeffery Farnol's novel The Broad Highway.
- E. M. Forster's novel Howards End.
- Rudyard Kipling's collection Rewards and Fairies containing the first publication of the poem "If—".
- H. G. Wells' novel The History of Mr Polly.
- Alfred North Whitehead and Bertrand Russell's book Principia Mathematica vol. 1, one of the most important and seminal works in mathematical logic and philosophy.

== Births ==
- 2 January – Kingsley Dunham, geologist (died 2001)
- 9 January – Tom Evenson, runner (died 1997)
- 11 January – Maurice Buckmaster, head of Special Operations Executive (died 1992)
- 15 January – Stephen Gilbert, artist (died 2007)
- 28 January – Hopper Read, cricketer (died 2000)
- 29 January – Colin Middleton, artist (died 1983)
- 8 February – G. E. M. de Ste. Croix, historian (died 2000)
- 10 February – Joyce Grenfell, actress, comedian and singer-songwriter (died 1979)
- 11 February – L. T. C. Rolt, writer (died 1974)
- 13 February – William Shockley, physicist, Nobel Prize laureate (died 1989)
- 21 February
  - Douglas Bader, World War II fighter pilot (died 1982)
  - Eddie Waring, rugby league commentator (died 1986)
- 1 March
  - Archer Martin, chemist, Nobel Prize laureate (died 2002)
  - David Niven, actor (died 1983)
- 4 March – Basil Boothroyd, humorous writer (died 1988)
- 17 March – Molly Weir, actress (died 2004)
- 22 March – Nicholas Monsarrat, novelist (died 1979)
- 23 March – Jerry Cornes, athlete (born in India; died 2001)
- 27 March – Robert Harling, typographer (died 2008)
- 31 March – Edward Seago, artist (died 1974)
- 6 April – Desmond Dreyer, admiral (died 2003)
- 8 April – Denis Redman, major-general (died 2009)
- 14 April – Kathleen Sully, novelist (died 2001)
- 19 April – Humphrey Spender, photojournalist (died 2005)
- 3 May – Bernard Orchard, biblical scholar (died 2006)
- 5 May – Charles Harington, Army officer (died 2007)
- 9 May – David Scott Blackhall, radio broadcaster (died 1981)
- 10 May – Arthur Marshall, writer and broadcaster (died 1989)
- 12 May – Dorothy Hodgkin, chemist, Nobel Prize laureate (died 1994)
- 16 May
  - Noreen Branson, communist activist (died 2003)
  - Richard Usborne, journalist and author (born in India; died 2006)
- 22 May – Molly Lamont, actress (born in India; died 2001)
- 25 May – Edward Harrison, cricketer (died 2002)
- 28 May – Rachel Kempson, actress (died 2003)
- 30 May – Harry Bernstein, author (died 2011)
- 1 June – Robert Megarry, judge (died 2006)
- 3 June – Wilfred Thesiger, soldier and explorer (died 2003)
- 4 June – Christopher Cockerell, inventor (died 1999)
- 6 June – Dorothy Carrington, writer (died 2002)
- 12 June – Bill Naughton, playwright (died 1992)
- 13 June
  - Bill Alexander, communist activist and Spanish Civil War commander (died 2000)
  - Mary Whitehouse, 'Clean-Up TV' and Christian morality campaigner (died 2001)
- 15 June – Alf Pearson, singer and part of Bob and Alf Pearson double act (died 2012)
- 17 June
  - Sam Costa, crooner, radio actor and disc jockey (died 1981)
  - Diana Mosley, socialite (died 2003)
- 18 June – M. S. Bartlett, statistician (died 2002)
- 21 June – Clive Sansom, poet and playwright (died 1981)
- 22 June
  - Peter Pears, tenor (died 1986)
  - Anne Ziegler, soprano (died 2003)
- 28 June – Barbara Bailey, nun and artist (died 2003)
- 3 July – Bernard Burrows, diplomat (died 2002)
- 7 July – Edgar Claxton, rail engineer (died 2000)
- 10 July – Ronald Fletcher, radio announcer and newsreader (died 1996)
- 11 July – Hugh B. Cave, science fiction writer (died 2004)
- 14 July – Vincent Brome, biographer and novelist (died 2004)
- 20 July – Veronica Wedgwood, historian (died 1997)
- 24 July – Edward Ford, courtier (died 2006)
- 4 August – William Cooper, novelist (died 2002)
- 5 August – Jacquetta Hawkes, prehistoric archaeologist (died 1996)
- 8 August – Jimmy Murphy, football player and manager (died 1989)
- 11 August – Hermione Hammond, painter (died 2005)
- 19 August – Gerald Ellison, Bishop of London (died 1992)
- 20 August – Harry Errington, World War II firefighter (died 2004)
- 26 August – Katherine Fryer, artist (died 2017)
- 2 September – Donald Watson, animal rights activist, pioneer of veganism (died 2005)
- 5 September – Leila Mackinlay, romance writer (died 1996)
- 10 September
  - Eric de Maré, architectural photographer (died 2002)
  - Betty Neels, novelist (died 2001)
  - Denis Richards, historian (died 2004)
- 11 September – Donald Wilson, screenwriter and television producer (died 2002)
- 15 September – Robert Carter, Royal Air Force officer (died 2012)
- 30 September – Edward Hyams, author, historian and gardener (died 1975)
- 6 October
  - Barbara Castle, politician (died 2002)
  - Bernard Hailstone, painter (died 1987)
- 16 October
  - Misha Black, architect and designer (died 1977)
  - Will Reed, composer (died 2002)
- 20 October – Hopper Read, cricketer (died 2000)
- 29 October – A. J. Ayer, philosopher (died 1989)
- 31 October – Victor Rothschild, 3rd Baron Rothschild, banker, zoologist and intelligence officer (died 1990)
- 5 November – John Hackett, general (died 1997)
- 8 November – Denis Mahon, art historian and collector (died 2011)
- 14 November – Eric Malpass, novelist (died 1996)
- 15 November – Hugh Greene, television director and journalist (died 1987)
- 19 November – Griffith Jones, actor (died 2007)
- 20 November – George Devine, theatrical manager (died 1966)
- 29 November – Hans Singer, German-born economist (died 2006)
- 1 December – Alicia Markova, ballerina (died 2004)
- 2 December – Penelope Aitken, socialite (died 2005)
- 3 December – Jane Shaw, children's author (died 2000)
- 4 December – Harry Wingfield, illustrator (died 2002)
- 16 December – Derek Bryan, diplomat, sinologist and writer (died 2003)
- 18 December – Leon Greenman, anti-fascist campaigner (died 2008)
- 19 December – Billie Yorke, tennis player (died 2000)
- 25 December – Howard Johnson, politician (died 2000)
- 29 December – Ronald Coase, economist Nobel Prize laureate (died 2013)

== Deaths ==
- 27 January – Thomas Crapper, inventor (born 1836)
- 3 May – Lottie Collins, singer and dancer (born 1865)
- 6 May – Edward VII (born 1841)
- 10 May – Anna Laetitia Waring, poet (born 1823)
- 12 May – Sir William Huggins, astronomer (born 1824)
- 31 May – Elizabeth Blackwell, American-domiciled abolitionist and women's rights activist (born 1821)
- 7 June – Goldwin Smith, historian (born 1823)
- 9 June – Sir George Newnes, periodical publisher (born 1851)
- 12 July – Charles Rolls, aviator and automobile manufacturer (born 1877)
- 13 August – Florence Nightingale, nurse (born 1820)
- 7 September – William Holman Hunt, painter (born 1827)
- 12 September – Cuthbert Arthur Brereton, civil engineer (born 1850)
- 19 September – William Maclagan, Archbishop of York (born 1826)
- 29 December – Reginald Doherty, tennis player (born 1872)

== See also ==
- List of British films before 1920
