= Guy Earle =

English cricketer

Personal information
- Full name: Guy Fife Earle
- Born: 24 August 1891; Newcastle upon Tyne, England
- Died: 30 December 1966 (aged 75); Maperton, Wincanton, Somerset, England
- Batting: Right-handed
- Bowling: Right-arm fast

Domestic team information
- Years: Team
- 1911–1921: Surrey
- 1922–1931: Somerset
- FC debut: 24 July 1911 Surrey v Derbyshire
- Last FC: 3 August 1931 Somerset v Kent

Career statistics
Competition	First-class
Matches	188
Runs scored	5,810
Batting average	20.17
100s/50s	2/25
Top score	130
Balls bowled	5,742
Wickets	104
Bowling average	29.87
5 wickets in innings	1
10 wickets in match	0
Best bowling	5/137
Catches/stumpings	111/–
- Source: CricketArchive, 19 January 2010

Guy Fife Earle (24 August 1891 – 30 December 1966) was an English cricketer who played first-class cricket for Surrey and Somerset for 20 years before and after the First World War. He also played in India, Sri Lanka, Australia and New Zealand as a member of official Marylebone Cricket Club touring teams, though he did not play Test cricket.

== School and early cricket ==
Earle was educated at Harrow School and was in the school's cricket team as a fast bowler and middle order batsman for four years. He was captain of Harrow against Eton College in the Eton v Harrow match at Lord's in 1910, known as Fowler's match, when Eton pulled off a sensational victory: having followed on 165 runs behind, Eton were only four runs ahead when the ninth wicket of the second innings fell and eventually set Harrow a target of just 55 to win. The Eton bowler Robert Fowler then took eight Harrow wickets for 23 as Harrow were all out for 45, leaving Eton winners by nine runs. Earle's captaincy, and specifically the decision to remove Harold Alexander, later Earl Alexander of Tunis, from the Harrow bowling attack and to bowl himself, was seen as a contributory factor in Eton's recovery.

In 1911, Earle appeared twice in first-class cricket for Surrey, taking four wickets in the two games. But he played no more first-class cricket before the First World War.

Earle served in the Rifle Brigade during the First World War, reaching the rank of captain before his discharge in 1919. In 1916 he is recorded as being on half-pay because of illness.

== Return to cricket ==
Before his discharge from the services, Earle played in a non-first-class match for the Royal Air Force against the Army, opening the bowling and top-scoring in a poor RAF first innings. In 1921, he returned to first-class cricket with Surrey, playing in two matches against Cambridge University and Oxford University at The Oval. In the Cambridge match, he took five second innings wickets for 137 runs as Cambridge ran up a total of 460 for six: this was his only five-wicket-innings return in first-class cricket and therefore these remained as his career-best bowling figures.

In 1922, Earle played in one match for Somerset, and from 1923 onwards he appeared fairly regularly for the county until the end of the 1929 season. His role at Somerset was primarily as a hard-hitting middle-order batsman, and though he took useful wickets in his first four seasons in Somerset, he bowled more than 160 overs in only one season, 1926.

Earle's only century for Somerset came in his first regular season, 1923. In the match against Gloucestershire at Bristol, he came to the wicket with Somerset at 331 for five, with Dar Lyon having already scored a century. Wisden, normally staid in its prose, reported that Earle was "amazing": he made 76 in "just over half an hour" to the close of play and then, when Somerset batted on into the second day, went on himself to finish with 111.

By the mid-1920s, Earle was playing cricket in the majority of matches for Somerset and in 1926 he played in 28 games, reaching 893 runs at an average of 21.78 in the season and also taking 30 wickets, both of them his highest season aggregates. Wisden referred to his "exceptional driving" and, 40 years later, wrote that "while by no means a stylist, (he) used his considerable physique to hit the ball tremendously hard".

After 1926, Earle was less effective in county cricket, and his highest score in his last four English seasons of regular cricket – 1927, 1928, 1929 and 1931 – was only 67, made in the match against Lancashire at Old Trafford in 1927. Unusually for Earle, in this innings he was not out: he was unbeaten in only seven of his 295 first-class innings, a very low percentage for a No 6 or No 7 batsman.

== Overseas cricket ==
Much of Earle's cricket in his Somerset days was played for amateur and touring sides, and he continued with this cricket after he stopped playing for Somerset in 1931. His first overseas venture was a short tour to the Netherlands with the Free Foresters cricket team in 1921, and he repeated the venture a year later. At the end of the 1924 season, he was a member of another amateur touring team, the Incogniti, who played several non-first-class matches in North American cricketing strongholds around New York City and Philadelphia.

More serious in cricketing terms was the official Marylebone Cricket Club (MCC) tour to India, which lasted from October 1926 to the end of February 1927. The Imperial Cricket Conference in London in 1926 had decided to encourage India, New Zealand and the West Indies to develop their local cricket infrastructures with a view to widening the number of Test cricket-playing countries, which had until then been restricted to England, Australia and South Africa and the MCC tour was part of this encouragement. Matches were also played in Ceylon and in territories that later became Pakistan and Burma. The MCC team was a strong one, captained by the England captain Arthur Gilligan and including Test players Bob Wyatt, Maurice Tate and Andrew Sandham. Earle held his own in this exalted company, making 767 runs at the, for him, high average of 34.86 runs per innings; his bowling was scarcely used at all. The batting included an innings of 130, the highest score of his first-class career and his second century, in the match against the Hindus at the Bombay Gymkhana ground in Mumbai. The innings included 26 runs from five consecutive balls, and he hit eight sixes and 11 fours; he put on 154 in 65 minutes with Tate. Despite this innings, he was not picked for the two representative matches against "All-India" which were the forerunners of Test cricket: a result of the tour was that Gilligan reported back to MCC that India appeared ready for Test cricket, though the failure to form a cricket board in India until 1928 meant the tour of England by an All-India side that year still not feature any Tests.

Three years later, Earle was a member of a similar MCC tour in 1929–30, this time to New Zealand, with matches played on the journey in both Sri Lanka and Australia. This tour coincided with a similar MCC tour to the West Indies and on both tours the representative matches were judged to be Test matches, though several regular England players sat out both tours and other players received their only Test caps by playing in the matches on the twin tours. Earle was not one of these players: in seven first-class matches in Australia and New Zealand, he failed to pass 50 in any innings and he was not picked for any of the four matches against New Zealand. In one of the matches in Australia on the way to New Zealand, Earle hit Australian spin bowler Clarrie Grimmett for 22 runs in an over, with three sixes; in New Zealand, he scored 98 in 40 minutes in a minor match against Taranaki.

The travelling went on. In both 1932 and 1934, he went on the tours of Egypt organised by Hubert Martineau, though the matches were not judged to be first-class. On the first of these, he was badly hurt in a motorcycle accident, and that forced his retirement from first-class cricket.

== Private and later life ==
Earle was married three times, his first two marriages ending in divorce. In 1918, he married Isabel Bridget Broughton-Knight, known as Bridget. They had a daughter, Audrey, in 1920, but divorced in 1922. He then married Helen Elliot in 1924, but they divorced in 1927. The next year she married Earle's Somerset cricket colleague Dar Lyon. Finally, he married Bridget Joan Sherston in 1935 and they had two daughters and a son between 1940 and 1945.

In the Second World War, Earle returned to the services, this time in the Royal Air Force. As a squadron leader of the Auxiliary Air Force, he transferred from the Balloon Branch to administrative and special duties in 1941. He stood down from his commission in 1945.
