= Fowler's match =

Fowler's match is the name given to the two-day Eton v Harrow cricket match held at Lord's on Friday 8 and Saturday 9 July 1910. The match is named after the captain of Eton College, Robert St Leger Fowler, whose outstanding all round batting and bowling performance allowed Eton to win the match by 9 runs after Harrow School asked Eton to follow on 165 runs in arrears after the teams' first innings. When the ninth Eton wicket fell in their second innings, they led by only four runs, and Harrow's eventual target was just 55. Wisden stated that: "In the whole history of cricket, there has been nothing more sensational" and The Times said that "A more exciting match can hardly ever have been played", continuing effusively, with a reference to the inaugural Ashes Test at The Oval in 1882, "to boys the bowling of Fowler was probably more formidable than Spofforth's to England".

In an article in The Spectator marking the match's centenary, J. R. H. McEwen described it as "what might just be the greatest cricket match of all time".

== Background ==
An inter-school cricket match has been held between Eton College and Harrow School since 1805, and annually since 1822. In its heyday, in the late 19th century and early 20th century, "the Schools' day" was one of the highlights of the London "season", alongside Henley Royal Regatta and Royal Ascot. The game made national newspaper headlines, and was attended by schoolboys large and small, their elder brothers and fathers, accompanied by their ladies and other members of London society. The match in 1914 was attended by over 38,000 people during its two days.

Fowler was 19 years old, and in his last year at Eton. His family came from Enfield, County Meath. His great-great-grandfather, also Robert, was Bishop of Ossory and then Bishop of Ossory, Ferns and Leighlin from 1817 until his death in 1841, and his great-great-great-grandfather, Robert Fowler was a Protestant clergyman who settled in Ireland in the 1760s and was Archbishop of Dublin from 1779 until his death in 1801. His father, Robert Henry Fowler, had served as an officer in the King's Shropshire Light Infantry and played cricket for Cambridge University against the MCC in 1876. Fowler attended Mr Hawtrey's prep school in Westgate-on-Sea, and was influenced at Eton by his housemaster, Cyril Wells, a gentleman cricketer who played for Middlesex. Fowler played for Eton against Harrow in the 1908 and 1909 fixtures. Harrow won easily in 1908, and the 1909 fixture was drawn, although Fowler's eleven wickets for 79 runs had given Eton a fighting chance.

In 1910, Fowler was one of only three survivors from Eton's 1909 team, the others being William Taylor Birchenough and the wicket-keeper Lubbock. Harrow had seven veterans from the 1909 match. Harrow came to the match unbeaten in 1910, having beaten the Free Foresters, Harlequins, Quidnuncs and the Household Brigade earlier in the season. Eton had lost to Free Foresters, Authentics and Butterflies. Two Old Harrovians, Stanley Jackson and Archie MacLaren, had been England captains in the preceding five years. In the run-up to the match, The Times noted on 4 July that Harrow and Marlborough were the strongest public schools; that Harrow's captain Earle "bowls extraordinarily fast for a boy" but the Eton captain Fowler "is not deadly on a good wicket, but can make every use of a difficult one". The Times also noted that an outbreak of measles threatened the Harrow team, but only Wilson succumbed, and he recovered before the match.

== The match ==
The two-day, two-innings match began on Friday 8 July 1910, with the sky grey and overcast. The outfield was soft and wet after rain the previous evening, but the pitch had been covered. The teams included one schoolboy who would become a field-marshal (Alexander), another an air vice-marshal (Blount), and a third an attorney-general (Monckton), together with various sons of nobility.

Play began shortly after 12 noon, with a good attendance despite the inclement weather. Harrow won the toss and batted first, but progressed slowly due to steady bowling and smart fielding by Eton, reaching 61/1 at lunch. Wickets started to fall after lunch. Earle was dropped, and then hit three fours before being caught off Steel. Wilson played a good innings, but was fifth out, bowled by a Lister-Kaye yorker for 53, leaving the score on 133/5. Hillyard obtained little support from the Harrow tail end, and was last out, stumped off Fowler for 62. The wicket was too slow to be difficult, and the Harrow batsmen were able to accumulate runs, reaching 232 in their first innings off 95.3 overs, with half-centuries for Harrow's Wilson (53) and Hillyard (62). The pitch was slow, but showed significant turn for the spin bowlers.

Fowler bowled his off spin well, with bad luck, often beating the batsman but failing to take the edge and then missing the wicket. Steel's length was not perfect, but he bowled his leg spin for his field and was not afraid to be hit. Lister-Kaye was perhaps the best of the bowlers, and Manners the best of the fielders, at cover-point. Lubbock let through 18 byes, mostly off the turning deliveries of Fowler. Fowler and Steel took four wickets apiece.

Eton started to bat at 5pm, when the light was worsening, and suffered a disastrous 90 minutes. Earle took an early wicket, but the slow pitch did not suit him, and Hillyard and Graham took two each. Eton were struggling at 40/5 when bad light stopped play at 6:30pm, half an hour before the scheduled close, with Eton needing another 93 runs to save the follow on. The Times described Eton's overnight position as "almost desperate", and the somewhat partisan coverage in the Daily Mirror, written by Wilson's brother, reported that "Harrow should win pretty easily."

The match resumed at 11am on the second day, Saturday 9 July 1910. The weather was cold again, and the sun did not come out until 5pm. The Eton batsmen struggled to deal with Alexander's googlies. He took 3/7 as Eton's first innings ended quickly, with Eton 67 all out in 48 overs. Fowler top scored with 21 runs, the only Eton batsman to reach double figures. Earle bowled 12 overs for 4 runs and 1 wicket, with 9 maidens; Alexander bowled four overs and one ball for seven runs and three wickets.

With Eton 165 runs behind, Harrow enforced the follow-on, and Eton fared little better at the start of their second innings. Alexander was still difficult to play – only Birchenough looked comfortable against him, but he was caught off Jameson for 22. Eton had lost 4 wickets for 47 runs by lunch, and subsided to 65/5 shortly afterwards when Steel was caught. The crowd anticipated an easy win for Harrow, and many departed – some to the last day of a closely fought Gentlemen v Players match being held at The Oval.

But Fowler was still batting, and added 42 runs for the sixth wicket with Wigan. Boswell joined Fowler after Wigan was out bowled. He rode his luck, adding 32 runs with several dropped catches, the seventh wicket partnership quickly adding 57 runs before Boswell was dismissed with Eton one run in arrears. Eton erased the first-innings deficit, to the delight of their supporters, but Fowler was eventually out for 64 runs, the highest individual innings in the match, with 8 fours, a three, 10 twos and 9 singles. Eton were 166/8, ahead by only one run. Stock was out quickly with Eton only four runs ahead, but Harrow supporters grew increasingly glum as the tenth-wicket partnership of Manners and Lister-Kaye hit 50 runs in a half an hour, giving Eton a lead of 54 runs. The Times on Monday 11 July reported "a most exhilarating half-hour's cricket while Manners and Lister-Kaye, especially Manners, hit the bowling all over the field".

Needing only 55 runs to win, Harrow captain Earle called for the heavy roller to pacify the pitch, but his tactic backfired and the Eton bowling became unplayable (the Daily Mirror claimed that the heavy roller was applied without Earle's consent). Fowler opened the bowling from the Pavilion End, obtaining prodigious turn immediately, and taking the wicket of Wilson with the first ball of the innings. Lister-Kaye bowled three overs from the Nursery End before being replaced by Steel. Hopely hit two fours, but then Fowler took two more wickets, reducing Harrow to 8/3. The Eton bowlers made it almost impossible for Harrow to score runs, and wickets continued to tumble, with Fowler taking the first six wickets to fall. Earle scored a quick 13 but was then controversially given out, caught at slip off a yorker which may have been a bump ball, 21/4. After 40 minutes, Harrow had reached 27/8, and opening batsman Jameson had not yet scored a run. He hit two runs to get off the mark, but was out shortly afterwards, a fifth Harrow batsman to be bowled by Fowler, to leave Harrow on 32/9. The eleventh Harrow batsman, Alexander, had to abandon his tea to come to the crease with 23 runs required for Harrow to win. He and Graham added 13 runs, but Alexander was caught at slip off Steel with Harrow still 10 runs short of the target, playing inside a ball that did not turn, at one minute before 6pm. Eton won by 9 runs. It was said that the cheering could be heard at London Zoo, some distance away in Regent's Park, and at Paddington Station. The Times reported that "most pardonable pandemonium reigned for fully half an hour". Fowler was carried off the pitch, and bowed to a cheering crowd from the pavilion.

Fowler ended the match having scored 21 and 64 runs, and taken 4/90 and 8/23. The Times described Fowler's contribution in the following terms: "in the whole history of public school cricket nothing better can have been seen than Fowler's play on the second day".

8 – 9 July 1910
Scorecard

Harrow School	v	Eton College
232 (95.3 overs); JM Hillyard 62; TB Wilson 53; AI Steel 4/69 (31 overs); RS Fowler 4/90 (37.3 overs)		67 (48.1 overs); RS Fowler 21; HRGL Alexander 3/7 (4.1 overs)
45 (19.4 overs); GF Earle 13; RS Fowler 8/23 (10 overs)		219 (f/o) (73.3 overs); RS Fowler 64; GF Earle 3/57 (17.3 overs); JM Hillyard 3/64 (23 overs)

Eton College won by 9 runs
Lord's, St John's Wood, London
Umpires: J Moss and JP Whiteside

- Harrow School won the toss and elected to bat.

== Teams ==
Harrow
TO Jameson	1892	1965	Hampshire, Ireland
TB Wilson	1892	1917		Brother of Frederic Bonhote Wilson. Killed in action, Second Lieutenant, 2nd Battalion, Irish Guards.
GWV Hopley	1891	1915	Cambridge	Brother of Frederick John Vanderbyl Hopley. Killed in action, Second Lieutenant, 2nd Battalion, Grenadier Guards.
TLG Turnbull	1891	1915		Also played in 1909, captain of Harrow in 1911. Killed in action, Private, 1st Battalion, Honourable Artillery Company.
GF Earle (captain)	1891	1966	Surrey and Somerset
WT Monckton (wicket-keeper)	1891	1965	Kent 2nd XI	Later Attorney General; created Viscount Monckton of Brenchley.
JM Hillyard	1891	1983		Son of George Whiteside Hillyard
CHB Blount	1893	1940	Combined Services, RAF	Later Air Vice-Marshal, killed in an aircraft crash on his way to Ireland.
AC Straker	1893	1961	Cambridge
OB Graham	1891	1971	Europeans (in India)
HRLG Alexander	1891	1969		Son of James Alexander, 4th Earl of Caledon. Later Field Marshal; created Earl Alexander of Tunis.
Eton
RH Lubbock (wicket-keeper)	1891	1961		Grandson of Sir Nevile Lubbock. Served in Royal Field Artillery and No. 906 (County of Middlesex) Balloon Squadron, Auxiliary Air Force.
CW Tufnell	1892	1914		Son of Carleton Fowell Tufnell. Captain of Eton in 1911; Second Lieutenant, 2nd Battalion, Grenadier Guards.
WT Birchenough	1892	1962		Son of William Taylor Birchenough who was married to Jane Peacock, daughter of Richard Peacock M.P and nephew of Sir Henry Birchenough.
WTF Holland	1893	?		21st Lancers?
RS Fowler (captain)	1891	1925	MCC, Hampshire	Served with 17th Lancers
AI Steel	1892	1917	Middlesex	Son of Allan Gibson Steel. Lieutenant, 2nd Battalion, Coldstream Guards. Died in Belgium.
DG Wigan	1893	1958	Oxford	60th Rifles
AR Stock	?	1915		Lieutenant, Ayrshire Yeomanry
Hon JN Manners	1892	1914		Son of John Thomas Manners-Sutton, 3rd Baron Manners. Lieutenant, 2nd Battalion, Grenadier Guards. Died in France. Subject of a poem in The Muse in Arms.
KA Lister-Kaye	1892	1955	Oxford, Europeans (in India), Yorkshire	Son of Sir Cecil Edmund Lister-Kaye, 4th Baronet. Later 5th Baronet.
WGK Boswell	1892	1916	Oxford	Eton team in 1911. Captain, 2nd Battalion, Rifle Brigade. Died of wounds.
