= Charles Hubert Boulby Blount =

English cricketer and Royal Air Force Air Vice-Marshal (1893–1940)

Charles Blount
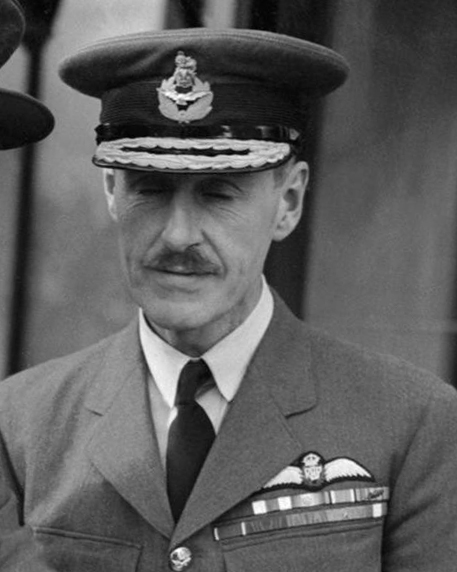
- AVM Blount at Arras, France circa 1939–1940
- Born: 26 October 1893; Kamptee, Maharashtra, British Raj
- Died: 23 October 1940 (aged 46) near Hendon Aerodrome, London, England
- Military career
- Allegiance: United Kingdom
- Branch: British Army (1913–1918); Royal Air Force (1918–1940)
- Service years: 1913–1940
- Rank: Air vice-marshal
- Commands: No. 22 Group (1939–1940); No. 4 Group (1938–1939); No. 2 Group (1937–1938); No. 70 Squadron (1930–1932); No. 7 Squadron (1926–1927); No. 4 Squadron (1920–1925); No. 34 Squadron (1917–1918)
- Conflicts: First World War; Second World War
- Awards: Companion of the Order of the Bath; Officer of the Order of the British Empire; Military Cross; Mentioned in dispatches (2); Knight of the Order of the Crown (Belgium); Silver Medal of Military Valor (Italy)

Air Vice Marshal Charles Hubert Boulby Blount, CB, OBE, MC (26 October 1893 – 23 October 1940) was a British soldier, airman and first-class cricketer.

== Family ==
Blount was born in Kamptee (now Kamthi), Bombay Presidency, India. His father, Major Charles Hubert Blount (1855–1900), served with the 20th Battery, Royal Field Artillery, and died of dysentery at Wynberg, Cape Town, Cape Colony, during the Second Anglo-Boer War.

Blount was the first son of his father's second marriage, to Mary Elizabeth Bell. He had half-siblings from his father's first marriage to Eleanor Maud Philips, including Blount's half-brother, Captain Greville Blount, RHA (1883–1914), who died in France during the first year of the First World War, who is a great-grandfather of singer James Blunt.

Blount's younger brother, John Hillier Blount, attended Sandhurst and was granted temporary commission as a Second Lieutenant in the Oxfordshire and Buckinghamshire Light Infantry in April 1918. He joined the nascent Royal Air Force, but died in an aircraft crash near Beverley in July 1918.

Blount's son, Christopher Charles Blount (1925–2025), became a Squadron Leader in the RAF. He married Susan Victoria Cobbold, the second daughter of Cameron Cobbold, 1st Baron Cobbold, in 1957, and was later awarded the MVO.

Blount's great-great nephew is singer James Blunt (né James Hillier Blount).

== Cricket ==
Blount attended Harrow School. He played cricket in the 1910, 1911 and 1912 Eton v Harrow matches, losing each time. The 1910 Eton v Harrow cricket match became known as Fowler's match, after the captain of Eton College, Robert St Leger Fowler, whose outstanding all-round batting and bowling performance allowed Eton to win the match by 9 runs despite being asked to follow on early on the second day, 165 runs in arrears after the teams' first innings. The teams included one schoolboy who would become a field-marshal (Harold Alexander), another an air vice-marshal (Blount), and a third an attorney-general (Walter Monckton), together with various sons of nobility.

Blount was wicket-keeper in the 1911 Eton v Harrow match, and captain in 1912, he scored 137 runs in the second innings of the 1912 match, but could not prevent Eton winning by 6 wickets. He also played six matches for Suffolk in the Minor Counties Championship in 1910 to 1912, for I Zingari against Harrow in 1921, and for Free Foresters against Harrow in 1937.

He played 10 first-class cricket matches between 1920 and 1930, four for the Combined Services cricket team and six for the Royal Air Force cricket team, scoring 575 runs at an average of 33.82, including his maiden century in his last first-class match against the Army in 1930, and took 12 wickets at an average of 25.25.

His name is recorded on the War Memorial at Lord's Cricket Ground.

== Army and Air Force career ==
Blount attended RMC Sandhurst immediately after leaving school, and became a Second Lieutenant in the Queen's (Royal West Surrey) Regiment in September 1913. He was promoted to Lieutenant in October 1914, and then Captain in March 1916. He was taught to fly a Maurice Farman biplane in 1916 and became a flying officer in the Royal Flying Corps. He was awarded the Military Cross on 14 November 1916 for organising his squadron and his own flying.

He took command of a flight of No. 34 Squadron, flying the Royal Aircraft Factory B.E.2 on the Western Front, in November 1916, became the squadron's acting commander in May 1917, and was confirmed as its commanding officer the following month, flying the Royal Aircraft Factory R.E.8. He was promoted to Temporary Major in June 1917, and became a Temporary Major in the RAF on 1 April 1918. He was also awarded the Italian Silver Medal of Military Valor.

He was appointed as commander of the Artillery and Infantry Co-operation School in May 1918, and was promoted to Acting Lieutenant Colonel on 1 May 1919. He resigned his commission in the Royal West Surrey Regiment in August 1919 after obtaining a permanent commission as a Squadron Leader in the RAF (with seniority backdated to 1 April 1918).

He commanded No. 4 Squadron at Farnborough, flying the Bristol F.2 Fighter, from March 1920 to 1925. His squadron took part in the Chanak Crisis in 1922, flying off HMS Argus. He was appointed OBE on 3 June 1924, and attended the RAF Staff College in 1925. He was promoted Wing Commander in 1925, and took command of No. 7 Squadron at RAF Bircham Newton in April 1926, flying the Vickers Vimy and Vickers Virginia.

He joined the Directorate of Operations and Intelligence in 1927, and commanded No. 70 Squadron from 1930 to 1932, flying the Vickers Victoria at RAF Hinaidi in Iraq. He was promoted Group Captain in 1932, and commanded the Engineering Staff at HQ Iraq Command from April 1932, before being appointed Commandant of the School of Army Co-operation at RAF Old Sarum in April 1933.

He became senior air staff officer (SASO), No. 2 (Bombing) Group in August 1936, and was promoted to air commodore in 1937, becoming temporary AOC, No. 2 (Bombing) Group and then succeeding Stanley Goble as air officer commanding (AOC), No. 2 (Bombing) Group in December 1937. He became AOC, No. 4 (Bomber) Group in May 1938. In July 1939, he was promoted to air vice marshal and became AOC, No. 22 (Army Co-Operation) Group.

In September 1939, soon after the beginning of the Second World War, Blount became AOC of the Air Component of the British Expeditionary Force, part of British Air Forces France. This was an RAF Command set up under the command of Air Marshal Arthur Barratt to provide unified control of all RAF units based in France. The Air Component of the BEF provided RAF reconnaissance and fighter cover.

In May 1940, after the Battle of France, Blount returned to England and resumed his post as AOC, No. 22 (Army Co-Operation) Group. He was appointed CB on 11 July 1940.

== Death ==
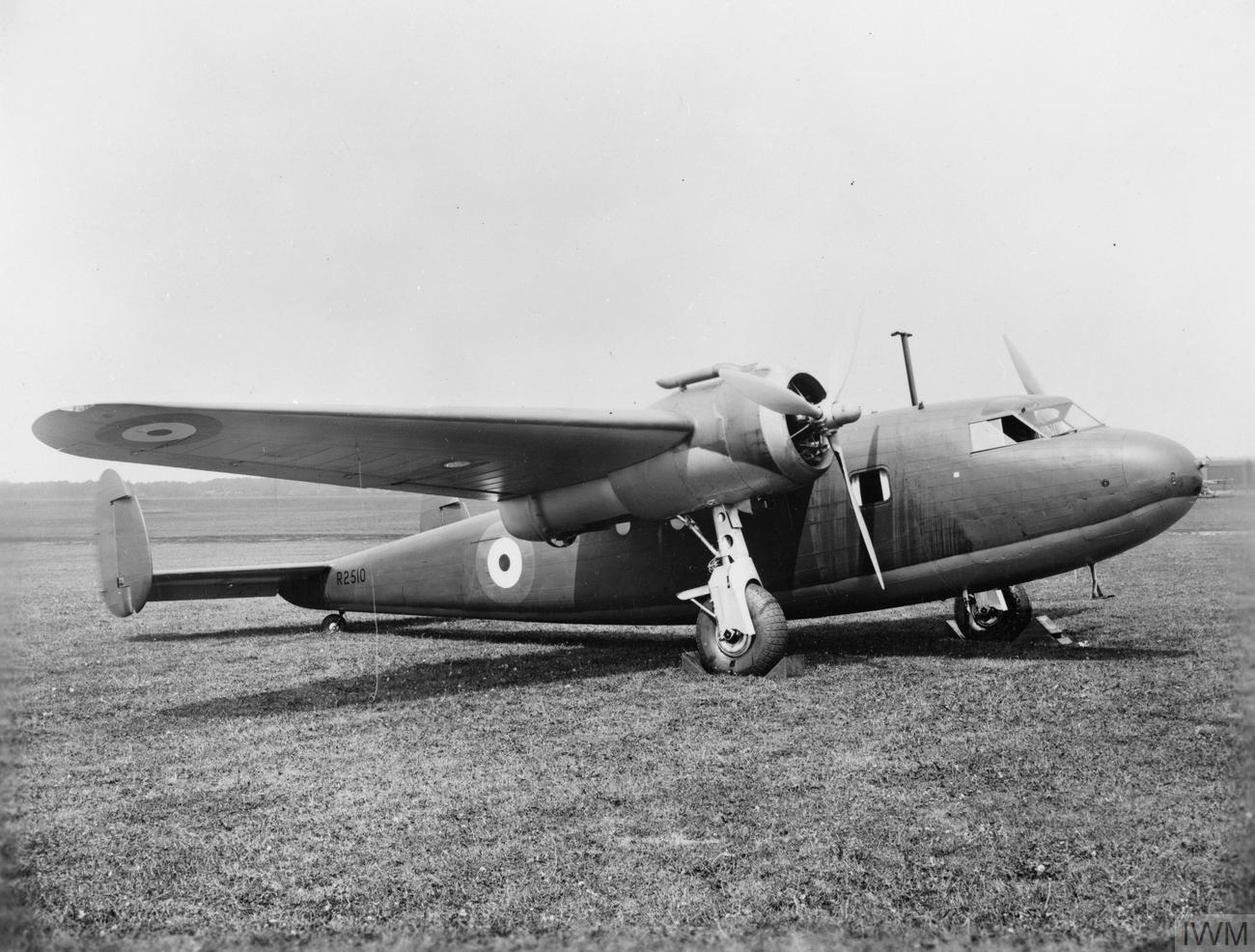
The de Havilland Hertfordshire of 24 Squadron that crashed on 23 October 1940 with the loss of 11 lives including Blount

Blount was killed in an air accident in October 1940, when a scheduled flight from Hendon Aerodrome to Belfast – where he was due to meet GOC, Northern Ireland – crashed near the airfield shortly after taking off, three days before his 47th birthday. He was buried in the south-west corner of the churchyard at St Mary the Virgin's Church, Essendon. He is commemorated on the Felixstowe War Memorial, where the death of his younger brother, John Hillier Blount in an accidental air crash in 1918 is also commemorated.

Military offices
Preceded by Stanley Goble	Air officer commanding No. 2 Group; 1937–1938	Succeeded by Cuthbert MacLean
Preceded by Arthur Harris	Air officer commanding No. 4 Group; 1938–1939	Succeeded by Arthur Coningham
Preceded by Bertine Sutton	Air officer commanding No. 22 Group; July – September 1939	Succeeded by Norman MacEwen
Preceded by Norman MacEwen	Air officer commanding No. 22 Group; May – October 1940	Vacant Title next held by Sir Arthur Barratt
