= Charles Lyttelton =

Charles Lyttelton may refer to:

- Sir Charles Lyttelton, 3rd Baronet (1628–1716), Governor of Jamaica
- Charles Lyttelton (bishop) (1714–1768), Bishop of Carlisle and antiquary
- Charles Lyttelton, 8th Viscount Cobham (1842–1922), English cricketer
- Charles Lyttelton, 10th Viscount Cobham (1909–1977), Governor General of New Zealand and English cricketer; captain of Worcestershire in the 1930s
- Charles Frederick Lyttelton (1887–1931), English cricketer
