= Geoffrey Colman =

English cricketer

Personal information
- Full name: Geoffrey Russell Rees Colman
- Born: 14 March 1892; Norwich, Norfolk, England
- Died: 18 May 1935 (aged 43); Framingham Earl, Norfolk, England
- Batting: Right-handed
- Bowling: Right-arm slow
- Relatives: Stanley Colman (cousin); Charles Lyttelton (brother-in-law); Denis Wigan (brother-in-law)

Domestic team information
- Years: Team
- 1924: Minor Counties
- 1912–1914: Oxford University
- 1911–1930: Norfolk

Career statistics
Competition	First-class
Matches	23
Runs scored	958
Batting average	24.56
100s/50s	1/2
Top score	127
Balls bowled	12
Wickets	1
Bowling average	14.00
5 wickets in innings	–
10 wickets in match	–
Best bowling	1/14
Catches/stumpings	17/–
- Source: Cricinfo, 23 September 2018

Geoffrey Russell Rees Colman (14 March 1892 – 18 March 1935) was an English cricketer active in first-class cricket from 1912 to 1924.

Colman was born at Norwich to mustard manufacturer Russell James Colman, of Crown Point House, Norwich, and Edith Margaret (née Davies). He was educated at Eton College, before attending Christ Church, Oxford. While still attending Eton, Colman made his minor counties debut for Norfolk in the 1911 Minor Counties Championship, making three appearances in that season. His debut in first-class cricket came the following year for Oxford University against the touring South Africans at the Magdalen Ground, Oxford. Prior to the start of World War I, Colman made 22 first-class appearances for the university. Playing primarily as a right-handed batsman, Colman scored 946 runs, making one century score of 127 against Hampshire in 1913. He gained his Oxford blue in 1913.

With the onset of war, Colman enlisted in the British Army. He served in the 7th Battalion, The Rifle Brigade on the Western Front with the rank of second lieutenant. He later served in the Machine Gun Corps, achieving the rank of temporary captain in January 1917. During the course of the war he was severely wounded, which would affect him in later years.

On 25 February 1919, Colman married Lettice Elizabeth Evelyn, daughter of Charles Robert Whorwood Adeane, of Babraham Hall, Lord Lieutenant of Cambridgeshire. Their five children included Timothy Colman. He also resumed playing minor counties cricket for Norfolk, representing his home county until 1930, but the wounds he sustained during the war curtailed his minor counties career. He made one final appearance in first-class cricket when he was selected to play for the combined Minor Counties cricket team in 1924 against the touring South Africans at the County Ground, Lakenham.

As a member of the Norwich Colman's family, he served as a company director until his death at Framingham Earl, Norfolk, on 18 March 1935, from endocarditis caused by a chest wound sustained during the war. After his death, the thatched pavilion at the County Ground in Lakenham was erected in his memory in 1936.
