= Robert Henry Fowler =

Irish cricketer and British Army officer (1857–1957)

Personal information
- Full name: Robert Henry Fowler
- Born: 28 June 1857; Collon, Ireland
- Died: 11 May 1957 (aged 99); Enfield, Leinster, Ireland
- Batting: Right-handed
- Relatives: Robert St Leger Fowler (son)

Domestic team information
- Years: Team
- 1876: Cambridge University

Career statistics
Competition	First-class
Matches	1
Runs scored	4
Batting average	2.00
100s/50s	–/–
Top score	3
Catches/stumpings	–/–
- Source: Cricinfo, 3 January 2022

Robert Henry Fowler (28 June 1857 – 11 May 1957) was an Irish soldier and first-class cricketer of English descent. He died seven weeks before what would have been his 100th birthday, making him the longest-lived person to have played international cricket for Ireland. He is also one of the longest-lived first-class cricketers of all time, having survived for nearly 81 years after he played his first – and only – first-class match.

Fowler was born at Mellifont, Collon, County Louth, Ireland, the eldest son of Robert Fowler (1824–1897). His grandfather, another Robert Fowler (1797–1863), was a deputy lieutenant and justice of the peace in County Meath. His great-grandfather, another Robert Fowler, was Bishop of Ossory and then Bishop of Ossory, Ferns and Leighlin from 1817 until his death in 1841, and his great-great-grandfather, yet another Robert Fowler, was an Anglican clergyman who settled in Ireland in the 1760s and was Archbishop of Dublin from 1779 until his death in 1801.

Fowler played cricket for Cheltenham College in 1874 and 1875, gaining some success as a right-handed opening batsman. He went up to St John's College, Cambridge, in 1875 and played one first-class cricket match for Cambridge University in 1876, batting twice at number 9 against the Marylebone Cricket Club and scoring 3 and 1. Also in the Cambridge team were later Test cricketers A. P. Lucas and Alfred Lyttelton (and his brother Edward Lyttelton).

He attended RMC Sandhurst and joined the British Army in 1878, being promoted to captain in the King's Shropshire Light Infantry in 1886.

Fowler played cricket for the MCC in 1885. He played in two matches for Ireland in 1888, one against Scotland and one against I Zingari, and then for I Zingari against Ireland in 1889 and 1890.

His son, Robert St Leger Fowler, was captain of Eton College in the match against Harrow in 1910, commonly referred to as Fowler's match due his outstanding all round performance; he is regarded as the best Irish cricketer not to have represented Ireland itself.

Fowler died at Rahinstown, Enfield, County Meath, Ireland.
