= Robert St Leger Fowler =

Irish cricketer and British Army officer (1891–1925)

Robert Fowler
Personal information
- Full name: Robert St Leger Fowler
- Born: 7 April 1891; Rahinstown, Ireland
- Died: 13 June 1925 (aged 34); Rahinstown, Leinster, Ireland
- Batting: Right-handed
- Bowling: Right-arm off break
- Relatives: Robert Henry Fowler (father)

Domestic team information
- Years: Team
- 1913: Marylebone Cricket Club
- 1924: Hampshire

Career statistics
Competition	First-class
Matches	24
Runs scored	957
Batting average	28.14
100s/50s	–/7
Top score	92*
Balls bowled	3,083
Wickets	59
Bowling average	24.77
5 wickets in innings	2
10 wickets in match	–
Best bowling	7/22
Catches/stumpings	21/–
- Source: Cricinfo, 23 January 2010

Robert St Leger Fowler MC (7 April 1891 — 13 June 1925) was an Irish first-class cricketer, often regarded as the best Irish cricketer not to have represented Ireland itself. An all-rounder who batted right-handed and bowled off spin, he is perhaps best known for his outstanding all-round performance as captain of Eton College in the match against Harrow in 1910, the match commonly referred to as Fowler's match. After serving in the First World War with the 17th Lancers, during the course of which he was awarded the Military Cross, Fowler played first-class cricket after the war mostly for the British Army cricket team, until his death from leukemia in 1925.

== Family and early life ==
Fowler was born in April 1891 at his family home at Rahinstown in Ireland. His father Robert Henry Fowler was an officer in the British Army and a first-class cricketer for Cambridge University. His great-great-grandfather, also Robert, was Bishop of Ossory and then Bishop of Ossory, Ferns and Leighlin from 1817 until his death in 1841, and his great-great-great grandfather, Robert Fowler was a Protestant clergyman who settled in Ireland in the 1760s and was Archbishop of Dublin from 1779 until his death in 1801.

Fowler was educated in England, attending firstly Mr Hawtrey's prep school in Westgate-on-Sea, and then Eton College. There he was influenced by his housemaster, Cyril Wells, an amateur cricketer who played for Middlesex. Fowler played for Eton against Harrow School in the 1908 and 1909 Eton v Harrow fixtures, with his bowling in the 1909 fixture almost leading Eton to victory with his accurate off breaks contributing to match figures of 11 for 79. He was also active in college athletics and was president of the Eton Society in 1910.

=== Fowler's match ===
In 1910, Fowler was 19 years old, and captain of cricket in his last year at Eton. His performance in the 1910 Eton v Harrow match has become a cricket legend, of such note that the 1910 match has been nicknamed Fowler's match.

The two-day two-innings cricket match was held at Lord's on Friday 8 and Saturday 9 July 1910. He was one of only three survivors from Eton's 1909 team, but Harrow had seven veterans from the 1909 match and came to the match unbeaten. Harrow won the toss and batted first, scoring 232. Despite some bad luck, Fowler took 4 wickets. Eton were in turn dismissed early on the second day for 67, with Fowler top scorer with 21; he was the only Eton batsman to reach double figures. Following-on, Eton subsided to 65-5 shortly after lunch. However, Fowler was still batting and added 42 runs for the sixth wicket with Denis Wigan and 57 runs for the seventh wicket with William Boswell. Fowler was eventually dismissed 64 runs, the highest individual innings in the match. A tenth-wicket partnership between John Manners and Kenelm Lister-Kaye guided Eton to a 55 run lead. In Harrow's second-innings, Fowler took figures of 8 for 23 to dismiss Harrow for 45, ten runs short of victory.

His all-round performance allowed Eton to win a match that appeared all but lost, having followed-on 165 behind. Wisden stated that "in the whole history of cricket, there has been nothing more sensational" and The Times said that "a more exciting match can hardly ever have been played", continuing effusively, with a reference to the inaugural Ashes Test at The Oval in 1882, "to boys the bowling of Fowler was probably more formidable than Spofforth's to England". The Times further described Fowler's performance in the following terms: "in the whole history of public school cricket nothing better can have been seen than Fowler's play on the second day".

== Military service and cricket ==
After completing his education at Eton, Fowler enrolled at the Royal Military College, Sandhurst. There, he won the Sword of Honour in 1911. Fowler graduated from there as a second lieutenant into the 17th Lancers in October 1911. Fowler made his debut in first-class cricket for the Marylebone Cricket Club (MCC) against Hampshire in 1913 at Lord's, and played a second match that season against Cambridge University at the same venue.

He served in the First World War with the 17th Lancers, during the early stages of which he was promoted to lieutenant. He was awarded the Military Cross in June 1918, in recognition of conspicuous gallantry and devotion to duty when in command of a dismounted party defending Amiens during the German spring offensive. The citation for his MC reads as follows:

For conspicuous gallantry and devotion to duty when in command of a dismounted party during six days' operations. He held on to his position when his left flank was exposed, and, though heavily outnumbered, he skilfully covered the withdrawal of the neighbouring troops. He showed great coolness and resource throughout.

After the war, Fowler played first-class cricket for the British Army cricket team against the Royal Navy in 1919, and made four further appearances for the Army in 1920. In June 1920, he was promoted to captain. He continued to play first-class cricket for the Army and the Combined Services until 1924; two of his three appearances for the Combined Services came against touring teams: the Australians in 1921, and the South Africans in 1924. Fowler played for the Army in 15 first-class matches, taking 49 wickets at an average of 17.85; he took two five wicket hauls, with best figures of 7 for 22. With the bat, he scored 639 runs at an average of 35.33; he made four half centuries, with a top-score of 92 not out.

In addition to his services cricket, Fowler also made three first-class appearances for Hampshire in 1924, as well as playing for the Gentlemen in the Gentlemen v Players fixture of that season. Such was his growing reputation as a cricketer, Fowler was invited to tour New Zealand in 1922–23 with an MCC team led by Archie MacLaren, but the Army refused him leave. He was also appointed captain of a proposed MCC tour to the West Indies in 1924–25, but the tour was postponed until the following year. He toured North America with Incogniti in 1920, where he was recorded as having scored 142 against All Philadelphia. The Irish cricket historian Edward Liddle regards Fowler as the best Irish cricketer not to have represented Ireland.

Outside of cricket, Fowler was the British Army rackets champion. Having become increasingly unwell during his winter leave, Fowler was given dispensation from the Army to return to his home in Ireland, where he was diagnosed with leukemia. He died from the disease in June 1925, aged 34 years.
