= St Bernard's Catholic Grammar School =

Catholic school in Berkshire, England

Location
- Langley Road; Slough, Berkshire, SL3 7AF; England; 51.5061°N 0.5737°W

Information
- Type: Voluntary aided Grammar school
- Motto: Dieu Mon Abri ("God is my shelter")
- Religious affiliation: Roman Catholic
- Established: 1897
- Local authority: Slough
- Department for Education URN: 110084 Tables
- Ofsted: Reports
- Head teacher: Paul Kassapian
- Teaching staff: 52
- Gender: Mixed
- Age: 11 to 18
- Enrolment: 1046
- Student to teacher ratio: 20.1
- Houses: Annay, Clairvaux, Cîteaux, La Plaine and Rievaulx
- Colors: Dark and Light Blue
- Website: http://www.st-bernards.slough.sch.uk

St Bernard's Catholic Grammar School (formerly St Bernard's Convent School) is an academically selective Roman Catholic state grammar school on Langley Road, Slough, Berkshire, England. It was previously designated as a Humanities College. The student body is divided into five houses: Annay, Clairvaux, Cîteaux, La Plaine and Rievaulx as of June 2024. The houses are named after monastic houses, relating to the school's history. The school's motto is "Dieu Mon Abri", which means "God is my Shelter". The crest is a diamond, with three parallel, diagonal, swords on a blue background. The school has been given an "outstanding" by Ofsted and its 2017, 2018 and 2019 results place it academically within the top 0.5% of the country.

== History ==
=== Aldin House ===
The school is built around and includes Aldin House, which dates from about 1860. Nikolaus Pevsner believed the house was built by and for Charles Aldin.

It was widely believed that the house was built for Angela Burdett-Coutts but that she never lived there as Queen Victoria did not approve of her marriage to the much younger William Lehman Ashmead Bartlett. The marriage did not take place until 1881, however, when the house had already entered use as a school, so Pevsner's version seems more plausible. In 1869, John Hawtrey opened St Michael's School in Aldin House. The school remained there for 14 years, with pupils including the future Prime Minister Stanley Baldwin. The original chapel was built in 1875, and dedicated as an Anglican chapel by Bishop Samuel Wilberforce of Oxford. After St. Michael's left, the site was used for a year by the Welsh Charity School of Ashford, Middlesex while their usual buildings were modified, and subsequently St George's School, Southwark used the building for the same purpose. The Jesuit Fathers bought the house and used it as a college for eight years.

=== St Bernard's ===
Aldin House was bought (and renamed St Bernard's) by the Bernardine nuns in 1897. Since then, various additions have been made to the building. Beginning with a school for 12 French students, the educational work of the Bernardines has evolved greatly. In 1904, day girls were first admitted to the school, leading to the development of a girls' grammar school. The school became co-educational in 1989. and now forms a large mixed Voluntary Aided Grammar School for 1100 students, aged 11–18.

In 1906, a nearby house was bought and opened as St Joseph's day school "for children of all denominations". In 1945, St Joseph's formally merged with St Bernards, becoming the preparatory school. In the 1970s and 1980s, the prep school moved to a new site, where it continues today as an independent fee-paying school for about 200 pupils, although it shares a badge with the state-supported grammar -school. Until August 2006, the school was also the home to nuns of the Bernardine order, who gave up their home for the school, and a few gave up their time to teach. At the time of the foundation, the convent was in the countryside, with nothing but fields separating it from Windsor Castle.

The convent was set in extensive grounds with fields, a vegetable garden, orchard and cemetery. A large house in the monastery grounds, Stella Maris, served as a small pastoral centre. The Bernardines considered their presence as a way of collaborating with the pastoral life of the church in the Diocese of Northampton. The nuns left the school in mid-2006.

The school opened a new café in the summer of 2019.

=== Merger plans ===
In October 2008 the schools confirmed that the Diocese of Northampton had approached the Department for Children, Schools and Families (DCSF) with a proposal to merge St. Bernard's Catholic Grammar School with St Joseph's Catholic High School to form an all-ability Catholic Academy on the St Bernard's site. The proposal was supported by Slough Borough Council and the governing bodies of the two schools. If approved, it would result in the first closure of a grammar school since 1997. In March 2009 the DCSF invited the council to develop concrete plans, with an intended opening date of September 2011.

A group of concerned parents calling themselves "Faith and Choice Together (FaCT)" created a web site (Save St Bernard's) to highlight opposition to the plan, and put forward three candidates who were elected as parent governors. They collected more than 1000 signatures on a petition. The parents' campaign was supported by the National Grammar Schools Association. In 2010 it was announced that the plans to merge the two schools had been abandoned, partly due to the opposition.

=== Claire Gill ===
On 28 June 2006 Claire Gill, a student at St Bernard's, hanged herself in a school cubicle after writing a suicide note. Police said bullying was not involved and did not treat the death as suspicious.

== Traditions ==
=== Guardian Angels ===
The most known tradition of the school is Guardian Angels. On this day, the male and female students exchange ties and there are various special events, including staff-student football and netball matches and plays or videos made by the Sixth Form. The day is entirely planned by students.

== Forms ==
There are about 1000 pupils, with five form groups in each year group: A, B, R, S and W. The letters correspond to the founder of the house (e.g. Citeaux, founded by Robert XXX, becomes R, and forms are titled 7R, 8R, 9R and so on).

Years 12 and 13 are organised into roughly six form groups each, though this can vary from year to year. Each form is named after the various monastic houses of the founding Bernadine Sisters. For example, 12Br and 13Br are dedicated to the Brownshill Monastery in Stroud, Gloucestershire; 12Mi and 13Mi are dedicated to the Mikkabi Monastery in Inasa District, Shizuoka Prefecture, Japan.

== Headteachers ==
- Dame Marie Hilda
- Mother Dorothy
- Sr Mary Anthony (1969–1982)
- Sr Mary Stephen (1983–1998)
- John McAteer MA (1998–2013)
- Michael Stimpson (2013–2017)
- Paul Kassapian (2017–present)
