= In Touch (radio series) =

BBC radio programme

In Touch is a programme on BBC Radio 4 airing "news, views and information for people who are blind or partially sighted".

== History ==
Janet Quigley who had been promoted into BBC management in 1956 took a key role in launching the world's first national radio programme for blind people which was named In Touch. In Touch began to be broadcast by the BBC Home Service in 1961, and was continued by BBC Radio 4 from 1967 with hosts including David Scott Blackhall and Peter White.

As of 2011, the programme is broadcast every Tuesday at 8:40pm UK time, and is 20 minutes in duration.
