= Johnnie Boden =

British entrepreneur and founder of Boden (born 1961)

Johnnie Boden CBE DL
- Born: John Peter Boden; 1 June 1961 (age 65)
- Education: Hawtreys; Eton College; Oriel College, Oxford
- Notable work: Founder of Boden
- Children: 3

John Peter Boden CBE DL (born 1 June 1961) is a British entrepreneur and founder of Boden, a catalogue clothing company, in 1991.

== Early life ==
John Peter Boden was born on 1 June 1961. His father was a lieutenant colonel who changed careers to become a farmer. John Boden was educated at Hawtreys preparatory school, and then Eton College, and read philosophy, politics, and economics (PPE) at Oriel College, Oxford.

== Career ==
At 16, he edited the menswear section of the 1977 Harpers & Queen Teenage Edition, but Boden's father was "dismissive", calling it a "stupid job".

After leaving university, Boden became a stockbroker with Barclays Merchant Bank, and SG Warburg Securities. spending some time at Wall Street. He was a stockbroker for five years. However, he "loathed" the job, and was "ill-suited – really bad at it". He ceased working as a stockbroker when he received an inheritance from a childless uncle. He dabbled in other jobs, as a publican and teacher in London. Boden enjoyed teaching, though disliked the low salaries.

=== Boden ===
He founded Boden in 1991, launching his first catalogue featuring pictures drawn by a friend, with eight menswear products available modelled by his friends. In 1992, Boden realised women were a better target for clothes, and launched women's clothing, followed by children's clothing, under the name 'Mini Boden', in 1996. However, it took "at least 10 years" for the finances to settle down due to robbery, and other circumstances; which ultimately led his inheritance to be gone in under three years. The firm is known for its "bright prints".

In the 2014 Sunday Times Rich List, Boden placed 368th, with a personal fortune of £300 million. As of the 2020 list, the Bodens own around 60% of the shares in the company, a stake worth £281 million.

Boden was appointed Commander of the Order of the British Empire (CBE) in the 2023 New Year Honours for services to fashion and the retail sector. In 2024, he was appointed a deputy lieutenant of Dorset.

== Personal life ==
Boden is married to Sophie, with whom he has three daughters: Anna, Katie and Stella.

Boden has been linked to illegal fox hunting, and is a lifetime patron of the Portman Hunt. ^{[3]}
