= Arthur Straker =

English cricketer

Personal information
- Full name: Arthur Coppin Straker
- Born: 12 August 1893; Hexham, Northumberland, England
- Died: 14 October 1961 (aged 68); Pawston, Northumberland, England
- Batting: Unknown
- Bowling: Unknown

Domestic team information
- Years: Team
- 1933–1935: Denbighshire
- 1913: Cambridge University

Career statistics
Competition	First-class
Matches	1
Runs scored	21
Batting average	10.50
100s/50s	–/–
Top score	21
Balls bowled	–
Wickets	–
Bowling average	–
5 wickets in innings	–
10 wickets in match	–
Best bowling	–
Catches/stumpings	–/–
- Source: Cricinfo, 24 August 2011

Arthur Coppin Straker (12 August 1893 – 14 October 1961) was an English cricketer. Straker's batting and bowling styles are unknown. He was born at Hexham, Northumberland. He was educated at Harrow School and played in the 1909 and 1910 Eton v Harrow matches at Lord's as a lower-order batsman.

Straker made his only first-class appearance for Cambridge University against Northamptonshire in 1913. In this match, he was dismissed for a duck by George Thompson in the university's first-innings, while in their second-innings he was dismissed for 21 runs by the same bowler. Straker later made appeared for Denbighshire, making his debut for the Welsh county in the 1933 Minor Counties Championship against the Yorkshire Second XI. He made a further four Minor Counties Championship appearances for the county, the last of which came against Cheshire in 1935.

He died in Pawston, Mindrum, Northumberland on 14 October 1961. At the time of his death he was described as a "racehorse owner and trainer".
