= Denis Wigan =

English cricketer, British Army officer

Personal information
- Full name: Denis Grey Wigan
- Born: 21 June 1893; Walton-on-Thames, Surrey, England
- Died: 31 December 1958 (aged 65); Pettistree, Suffolk, England
- Batting: Right-handed
- Bowling: Right-arm slow
- Relatives: Charles Lyttelton (nephew); Geoffrey Colman (brother-in-law)

Domestic team information
- Years: Team
- 1913–1914: Oxford University

Career statistics
Competition	First-class
Matches	6
Runs scored	119
Batting average	14.87
100s/50s	–/1
Top score	73*
Balls bowled	102
Wickets	4
Bowling average	11.25
5 wickets in innings	–
10 wickets in match	–
Best bowling	3/14
Catches/stumpings	4/–
- Source: Cricinfo, 4 June 2020

Denis Grey Wigan (21 June 1893 – 31 December 1958) was an English first-class cricketer and British Army officer.

The son of Sir Frederick William Wigan, he was born at Walton-on-Thames in June 1893. He was educated at Eton College, where he took part in the Fowler's match of 1910 and captained the college cricket team in 1912. From Eton, Wigan went up to Magdalen College, Oxford. While studying at Oxford, he played first-class cricket for Oxford University in 1913 and 1914, making six appearances. He scored 119 runs in his six matches, at an average of 14.87 and a high score of 73 not out. Due to the commencement of the First World War in July 1914, his time at Oxford was prematurely cut short, denying him his blue.

Wigan served in the war, being commissioned as a second lieutenant in the King's Royal Rifle Corps in September 1914. He was promoted to lieutenant in December 1914. He was later made a temporary captain, but relinquished the rank in June 1915, having been repatriated to England after developing neurasthenia, for which he was not successfully treated. During his absence from the front he was promoted to the full rank of captain in August 1916. His ill health led to him being invalided out of the army, with Wigan retiring from active service in June 1917. Following the war, he settled in Suffolk where he took up farming. Despite being invalided, he commanded his local Home Guard unit during the Second World War, though these duties too took a further strain on his health. Later in life he served as a justice of the peace for Suffolk. Wigan died in December 1958 at Pettistree, Suffolk. He was survived by his wife, Mabel, whom he had married in October 1915. The couple had four children, with two dying in infancy. His nephew, Charles Lyttelton, and brother-in-law, Geoffrey Colman, both played first-class cricket.
