= Ogilvie Graham =

Irish cricketer and British Army officer

Ogilvie Graham DSO OBE TD
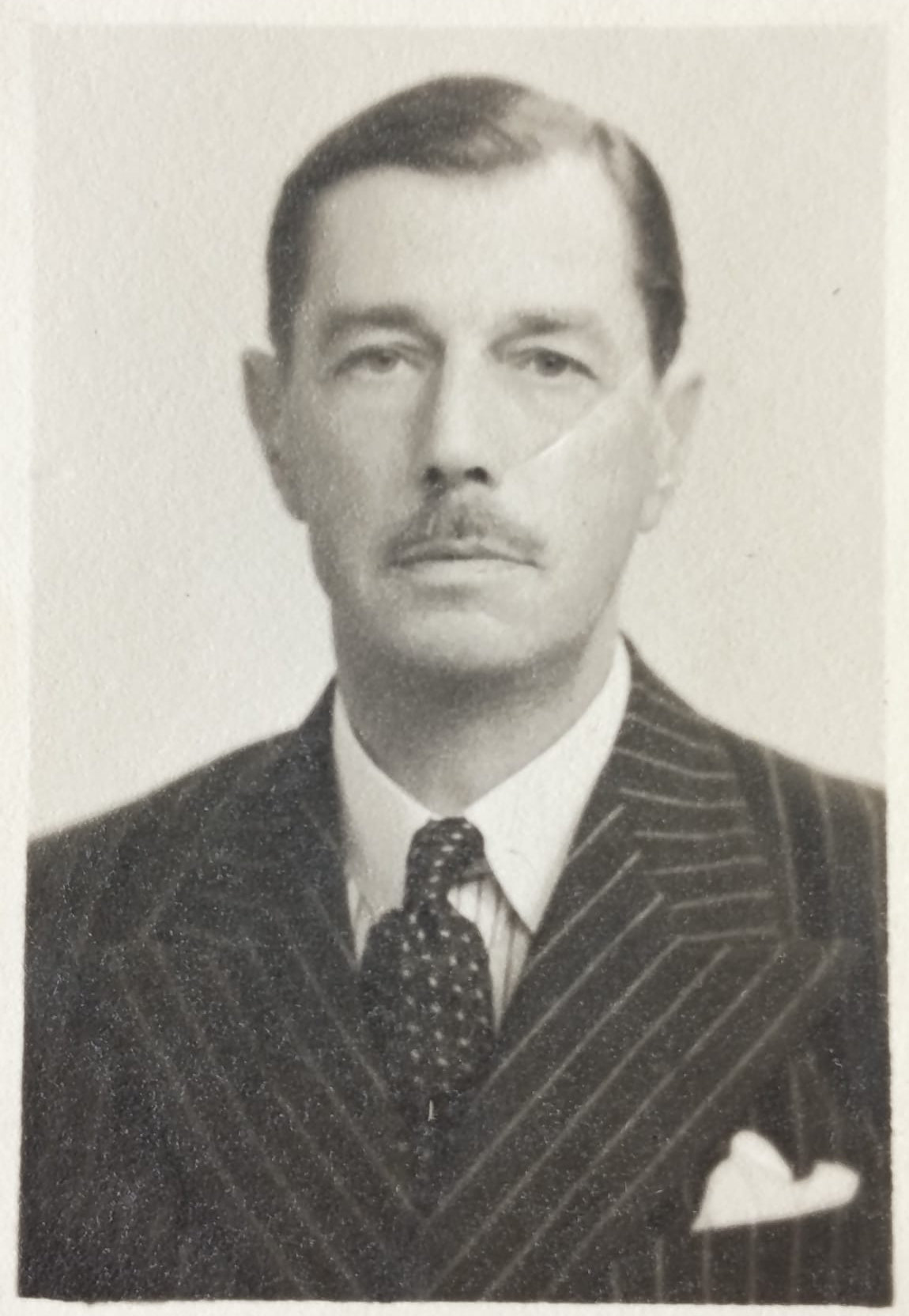

Personal information
- Full name: Ogilvie Blair Graham
- Born: 8 July 1891; Dunmurry, Ireland
- Died: 30 May 1971 (aged 79); Lower Quinton, Warwickshire, England
- Batting: Unknown
- Bowling: Unknown

Domestic team information
- Years: Team
- 1926/27: Europeans (India)

Career statistics
Competition	First-class
Matches	4
Runs scored	31
Batting average	5.16
100s/50s	–/–
Top score	16
Balls bowled	330
Wickets	10
Bowling average	16.50
5 wickets in innings	–
10 wickets in match	–
Best bowling	4/12
Catches/stumpings	2/–
- Source: ESPNcricinfo, 1 December 2018

Ogilvie Blair Graham, DSO, OBE, TD (8 July 1891 – 30 May 1971) was an Irish first-class cricketer and British Army officer. Graham served with the Oxford University Officers' Training Corps before receiving a commission in the Rifle Brigade. During the First World War he rose to command a battalion of the Rifles and received the Distinguished Service Order. Graham was later an instructor in infantry tactics, before transferring to the Royal Artillery (RA) in the Territorial Army. During the Second World War he commanded the RA defences in Northern Ireland and was appointed an officer of the Order of the British Empire. He also served as a deputy lieutenant and High Sheriff of County Down. Graham played cricket for Harrow School and later made first-class appearances for Oxford University, the Europeans and the Indian Army cricket team.

== Early life and military service ==
The son of Ogilvie Blair Graham Sr. and his wife Grace Cottenham, Graham was born at Dunmurry at County Antrim in July 1891. He was educated in England at Harrow School, where he played for the school cricket team, which included playing in the 'Fowler's match' of 1910. Upon leaving he went up to Trinity College, Oxford. While at Trinity, he was a member of the Oxford University Officers' Training Corps contingent, and was promoted to second lieutenant in that unit on 28 February 1912. He was later on the unattached list of the Territorial Force from which he transferred to the Rifle Brigade on 20 August 1913. His appointment as second lieutenant in the regular army was later antedated to 19 January 1912.

=== First World War ===
Graham served with the British Army during the First World War, being promoted to the rank of lieutenant on 5 August 1914 – shortly after the war started. Graham was subsequently promoted to captain which was later antedated to 15 September 1915 and later transferred to the Special Reserve. He returned to the Rifle Brigade as second in command of a battalion, receiving promotion to the temporary rank of major on 22 June 1916. Graham was promoted to the acting rank of lieutenant-colonel on 7 November 1916 when he was placed in command of a battalion of the Rifles, though he relinquished the command and acting rank on 6 December. He was appointed a companion of the Distinguished Service Order on 4 June 1917.

Graham was seconded as a chief instructor to the army's School of Instruction on 6 October 1917 and again on 22 March 1918 when he was granted the temporary rank of lieutenant-colonel whilst commanding the Fifth Army Infantry School. His appointment as chief instructor was relinquished, along with his temporary rank on 20 March 1919.

=== Inter-war ===
After the war Graham was seconded to the Territorial Army (TA) as adjutant of the 5th Battalion of the London Regiment on 13 September 1922. Graham retired from the army as a major in 1935, but was promoted to lieutenant-colonel on 9 November of that year with seniority antedated to 13 October 1934. Graham was appointed a major of the 188th (Antrim) Heavy Battery of the Royal Artillery (RA) in the TA on 5 May 1937, from the reserve list of officers.

=== Second World War and after ===
Throughout the Second World War, from 1939 to 1945, Graham commanded the Fixed Defences (Royal Artillery garrisons in fortifications) of Northern Ireland. Graham relinquished his TA commission on 5 June 1940 and was transferred to the regular army Royal Regiment of Artillery on the same date. Graham was appointed an officer of the Order of the British Empire in the New Years Honours of 1944. He subsequently served as a reserve officer until reaching the age limit on 7 September 1946. Graham was appointed an honorary colonel of a TA unit on 31 December 1946 and received the Territorial Efficiency Decoration on 21 April 1950. Graham's appointment as an honorary colonel expired on 31 December 1952, but he retained the honorary rank.

== Cricket career and personal life ==
Graham made his debut in first-class cricket for the Free Foresters against Oxford University at Oxford in 1923. While serving in British India, he played a further two first-class matches for the Europeans against the Parsees and the Hindus in September 1926 at Poona. Later in November 1926, he played a final first-class match for the Indian Army cricket team against the touring Marylebone Cricket Club at Lahore. Across his four first-class matches, Graham scored a total of 31 runs and took 10 wickets.

Graham married Winifred Maud Hurford MBE in 1919, an administrator in Queen Mary's Army Auxiliary Corps whom he met at the Battle of the Somme while serving on the Western Front. Winifred had refused to relinquish a farmhouse she had been using to house a team of nurses, cooks and secretaries to Graham. After the war they lived at Larchfield near Lisburn. Graham also served as a senior managing director of the family-run York Street Flax Spinning Mill in the Lagan Valley. He served as the deputy lieutenant for County Down in 1943; three years later he served as the High Sheriff of County Down. He died in England at Lower Quinton on 30 May 1971. His grandson is Richard Graham, the former Member of Parliament for Gloucester.
