= Boden (clothing) =

British clothing retailer

- Industry: Clothing industry
- Founded: 1991
- Founder: Johnnie Boden
- Headquarters: North Acton, London, England
- Area served: United Kingdom, Germany, Australia, United States
- Products: Homeware and clothing
- Website: www.boden.com

Boden is a British clothing retailer founded by Johnnie Boden in 1991. It started as a mail-order business. In 2024 Boden reported annual sales of £363m, predominantly in the US, the UK and Germany, 1.8m customers and 862 employees. Although Boden sells its clothes online, the printed catalogue that first brought the brand to the attention of British families still plays a part in its marketing. Boden has a large international following. In 2024 the business made 45% of its sales in the US, its largest market.

== History ==
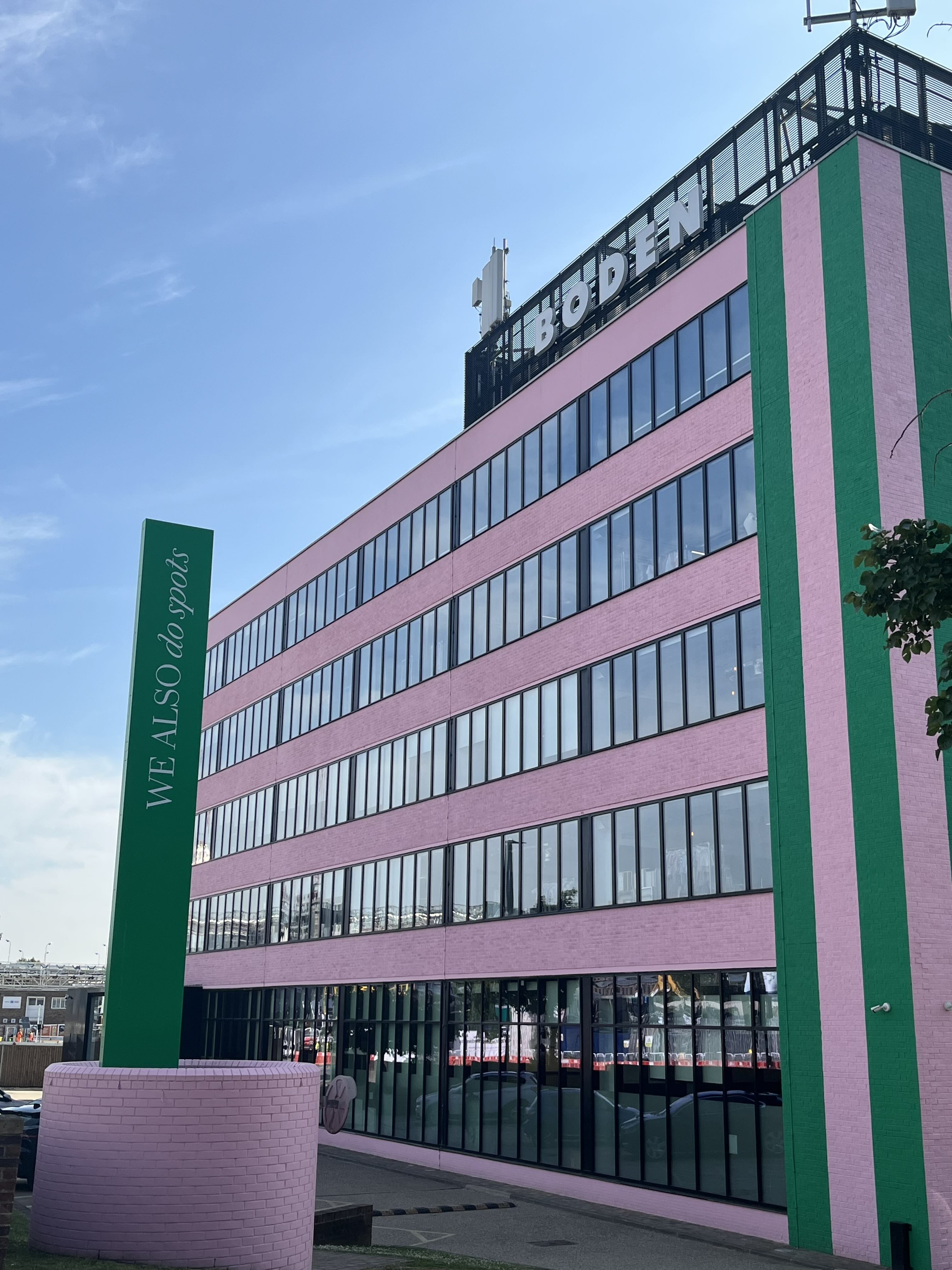
Boden Headquarters - stripes added in January 2025

After working as a stockbroker in the City of London and on Wall Street – a job he reportedly spent years "loathing" – Johnnie Boden decided to go out on his own. He identified a gap in the British market for an upmarket mail order clothing catalogue of the kind he'd seen during his time in New York. The brand’s launch catalogue in November 1991 was a hand-drawn affair conceived on the founder's kitchen table with just eight menswear products. Womenswear launched in 1992. The Mini Boden childrenswear range followed in 1996. Boden started selling clothes online in the UK in 1999 and then launched websites in the US (2002), Germany (2007), France (2011) and Australia (2014). The business upgraded its websites in January 2025 and customers can shop from dedicated Boden websites in its UK, US and EU markets and through a number of large third-party retailers globally.

In October 2025, Boden triggered backlash after it launched a campaign featuring models posing as fisherman holding dead salmon. Critics called the fashion shoot “irresponsible” at a time when salmon stocks in Britain’s rivers are at an all-time low.

== Products ==
Johnnie Boden has described Boden customers as being “interested in fashion” without being obsessed with it. The brand is known for its bold colour and attention to detail. Products often feature spots, stripes, printed fabrics and checks. As an entrepreneur Johnnie Boden has championed British creativity. These efforts were recognised with the award of a CBE for services to fashion and the retail sector in the New Year Honours List, announced on 30 December 2022.

== Impact on the planet ==
Boden reported in 2022 that the business had become carbon neutral for Scope 1 and 2. In packaging the business reported that it was using 100% recycled cardboard boxes,100% recycled clothing bags and dispatch bags with 80% recycled content (and 100% recyclable). In 2022 the business also reported the following developments in fabric sourcing: 100% of its Cashmere fabric was Good Cashmere certified; all outer fabric on its swimwear was made using 100% recycled nylon or recycled polyester; and recycled cotton made up 20% of the composition of its women’s denim. Boden’s Sustainability Report of 2023 reported further developments in fabric sourcing. All of Boden’s 100% linen fabric was made with 20% recycled linen content and all Mini Boden polyester outerwear style outers and linings were made from recycled polyester.

== See also ==
- List of companies based in London
