= Mark Stone (journalist) =

British journalist

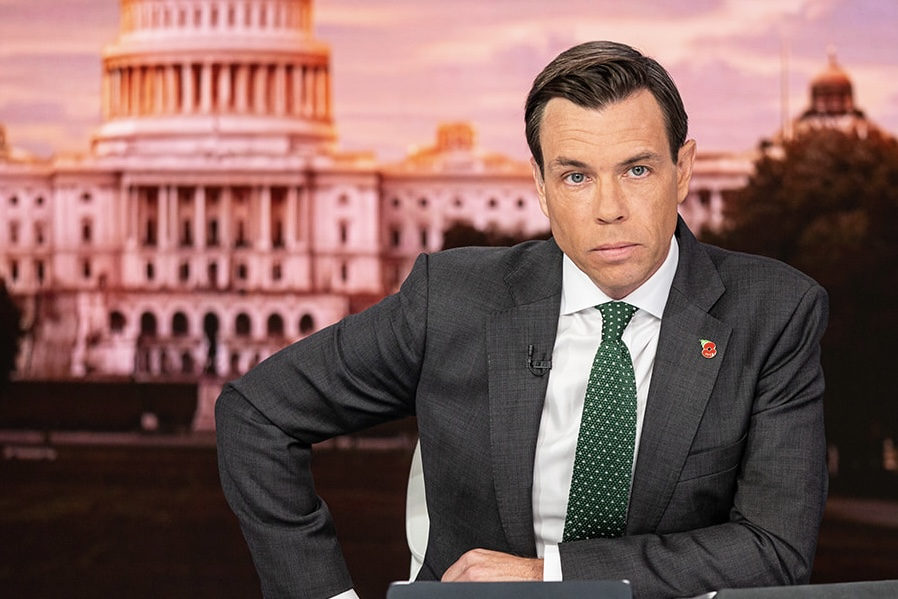
- Stone in 2024
- Born: 29 January 1979 (age 47)
- Education: Hawtreys School; Cheltenham College
- Alma mater: University of East Anglia (BA)
- Occupations: Journalist; correspondent; broadcaster
- Children: 3
- Website: https://news.sky.com/author/mark-stone-551

Mark Stone (born 29 January 1979) is a British journalist who is currently US correspondent for Sky News and co-host of Sky's Trump 100 podcast. He was previously the network's Europe Correspondent, Asia Correspondent and Middle East correspondent.

== Early life ==
Stone was educated in the United Kingdom, first at Hawtreys School in Wiltshire, then at Cheltenham College, followed by the University of East Anglia.

== Life and career ==
Stone joined the London Bureau of ABC News in 2002 as a news desk assistant.

Between 2003 and 2004, as a producer, he spent nearly a year living in Baghdad, Iraq where he reported on the capture of Saddam Hussein and the growing insurgency in Iraq. He was part of a team which won an Emmy for their coverage.

Stone joined Sky News in 2005 working first as a producer before switching to reporting in 2007.

He was one of the first British journalists to 'embed' with the British Army in Afghanistan's Helmand Province in July 2006.

In August 2011, Stone played a widely reported role in Sky News coverage of the London riots. In one of the first examples of the use of mobile devices for newsgathering, Stone used just an iPhone to broadcast scenes of theft, arson and his own confrontation with looters, which both led Sky News bulletins and were covered widely by global broadcasters. He was nominated by the Royal Television Society for his innovative coverage of the riots.

In 2012, he became the network's Asia Correspondent, based in Beijing, China.

In March 2013, Stone and his cameraman were detained in Beijing's Tiananmen Square . They had been filming a report about the 1989 protests and were then detained after being accused of not having the right accreditation. They broadcast live from a police van as it drove them away for questioning. They were released after several hours of interrogation.

In July 2013, in North Korea, he and his Sky News team produced the first ever live international broadcasts from events at locations around the capital Pyongyang using newly available broadcast technology from Aviwest.

In 2015, he moved to Brussels, Belgium as the network's Europe Correspondent where he provided extensive coverage of Europe's migration crisis and Brexit.

In May 2019, Sky announced that Stone would become the network's Middle East Correspondent.

In November 2020, during the United States presidential election, Stone attended the Four Seasons Total Landscaping press conference where he clashed with Rudy Giuliani over claims that the election had been stolen.

In March 2021, Sky News announced that Stone would become the network's US correspondent based in Washington DC.

In June 2021, Stone was criticized for a social media exchange in which he appeared to explain or excuse antisemitism in the United Kingdom; he subsequently apologized and stated that this was not his intention.

In 2025, Stone launched Sky's Trump 100 podcast, co-hosting with Martha Kelner and James Matthews.

== Awards ==
In 2023 and 2025, Stone won the New York Festivals gold and silver award for Best News Correspondent.

His work on migration across Europe in 2016 formed a central part of Sky's Emmy award-winning coverage of the same year.

His work in Burma, North Korea and China has also been recognised by the OneWorld Media Awards.

In 2014, he was nominated for RTS Journalist of the Year by the Royal Television Society for his work across Asia.

In 2012, Sky's coverage of the London riots, dominated by Stone's eyewitness reports, won the Home News coverage award at the Royal Television Society. The jury describing it as “featuring front line reporting that was brave, illuminating and captured some remarkable moments in a fast moving story with real ingenuity… a top quality example of rolling news coverage.” The Royal Television Society also nominated Stone for his innovative use of mobile journalism in his coverage of the London riots.

In 2004, working for ABC News, Stone and his team were awarded an Emmy for their coverage of the Iraq War.

== Family ==
Stone is married with three children. He lives in Washington DC. His brother is Col. Guy Stone, Welsh Guards who is the Deputy Commander of the British Army’s Household Division.
