= Hawtreys =

Independent preparatory school in England

Coordinates: 51.377°N 1.644°W

Hawtreys School

Location
- Slough, later Westgate-on-Sea, then Oswestry, and lastly Savernake Forest, Wiltshire; England

Information
- Type: Private preparatory school
- Established: 1869
- Founder: Reverend John Hawtrey
- Closed: 1990s
- Age: 7 to 13
- Merged with: Cheam School
- Alumni: Old Hawtreyans
- Website: www.cheamschool.com

Hawtreys Preparatory School was a private boys' preparatory school in England. First established in Slough, it later moved to Westgate-on-Sea, then to Oswestry, and finally to Tottenham House near Great Bedwyn, Wiltshire. Until 1916 it was known as St Michael's School.

In 1994, the school merged into Cheam School, near Newbury, Berkshire.

== History ==
The school was founded in 1869 by the Reverend John Hawtrey. He had been a boy at Eton, from the age of eight. In later life he became a master at Eton and was offered his own house of boys. He decided to remove all of the younger boys from the school. With the permission of Eton College, he took the lowest two forms out to a separate school in Slough and housed them in what is now St Bernard's Catholic Grammar School. The new school was known as St Michael's School and was opened on 29 September 1869 (Michaelmas).

John Hawtrey's son, Edward, removed the school to Westgate-on-Sea early in 1883. After Edward Hawtrey died in 1916, the name of the school was changed to Hawtreys.

The school buildings were requisitioned during the Second World War and the school moved to Oswestry in Shropshire, to the home of Sir William Wynn-Williams. In 1946 it moved again to Tottenham House, a large Palladian country house near the village of Great Bedwyn, Wiltshire, in the heart of Savernake Forest, when the last private owner, Chandos Brudenell-Bruce, 6th Marquess of Ailesbury, retired to Jersey.

Throughout the history of the school, a close connection was maintained with Eton College, to which many boys moved at the age of thirteen.

Gerald Watts was headmaster from 1975 to 1990. When he left Hawtreys, numbers fell fast, falling from 128 to 50 in two years. Those taking their sons out of the school included Kanga Tryon, who complained that the atmosphere was "no longer as it ought to be". In 1994, unable to survive, Hawtreys merged with Cheam School, which is formally called Cheam Hawtreys, but generally known simply as Cheam.

"Hawtreys School Staff and Pupils" were listed in the credits of A Feast at Midnight (1994), a British comedy film about a prep school, made in the last operational year of Hawtreys.

== Old Hawtreyans ==
And see Category:People educated at Hawtreys

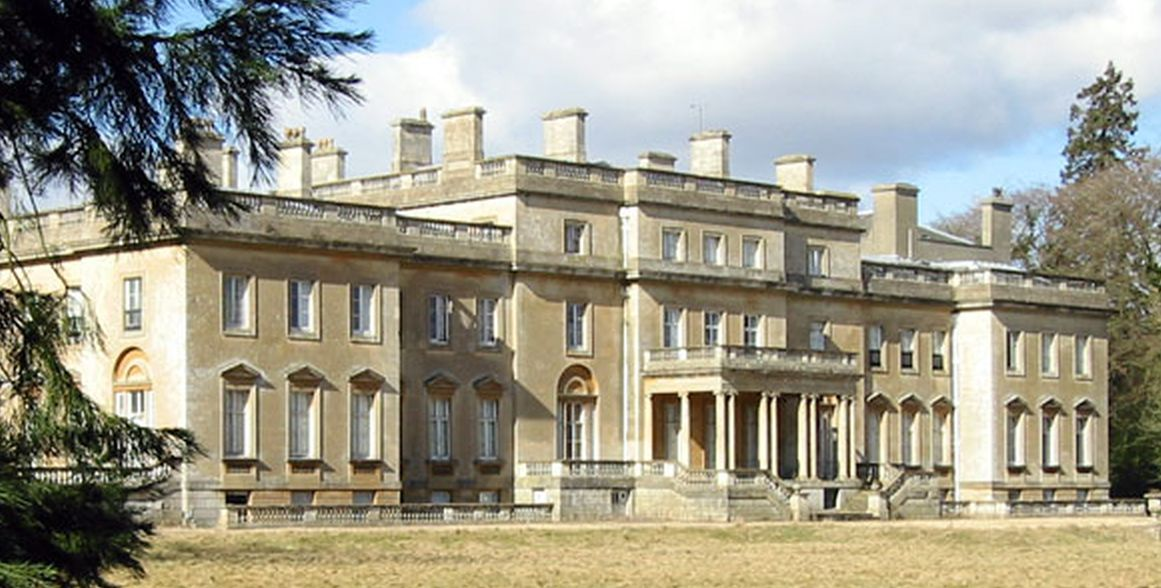
Tottenham House, Wiltshire, final home of Hawtreys

- Field Marshal Lord Alexander (1891–1969)
- Sir Euan Anstruther-Gough-Calthorpe, 3rd Baronet (born 1966), property manager
- Stanley Baldwin, 1st Earl Baldwin of Bewdley KG (1867–1947), British prime minister
- George Barclay, Battle of Britain pilot
- Johnnie Boden, shirt-manufacturer
- David Brudenell-Bruce, 9th Marquess of Ailesbury (born 1952)
- Detmar Blow (1867–1939), architect
- Henry Cookson Guinness Book of Records as member of first team to reach the Antarctic Pole of inaccessibility in 2007
- Robert St Leger Fowler (1891–1925), cricketer
- Zac Goldsmith (born 1975), Conservative politician, environmentalist and editor of The Ecologist
- George Peabody Gooch (1873–1968), historian, social and political activist
- Simon Hart (born 1963), Conservative politician and Secretary of State for Wales
- Thomas Lange, hotelier, philanthropist, & author
- Dai Llewellyn, 4th Baronet (1946-2009), socialite
- Sir Roddy Llewellyn, 5th Baronet (born 1947), partner of Princess Margaret and horticulturalist
- Oliver Messel (1904–1978), artist and stage designer
- Jake Meyer, Mountaineer
- Sir Anthony Rupert Milburn, 5th Baronet (born 1947), landowner
- Edward Moss (1911–1944), first-class cricketer and Royal Air Force Volunteer Reserve officer
- Sir Peter O'Sullevan (1918–2015), BBC racing commentator
- John Seymour, 19th Duke of Somerset (born 1952)
- Henry Somerset, 12th Duke of Beaufort (born 1952)
- Mark Stone, journalist and Foreign Correspondent
- Dorian Williams, rider and broadcaster

== Notable staff ==
- G. Wilson Knight taught at the school from 1923 to 1925
