= Kenelm Lister-Kaye =

English cricketer

Sir Kenelm Arthur Lister-Kaye, 5th Baronet (27 March 1892 – 28 February 1955) was an English amateur first-class cricketer, who played eight games for Oxford University in 1912, two matches for the Europeans in matches in India in 1920/21 and 1922/23, plus two games for Yorkshire County Cricket Club in 1928.

Born in Kensington, London, England, the second son of Sir Cecil Edmund Lister-Kaye, 4th Baronet, Lister-Kaye was educated at Eton College where he played in Fowler's match in 1910. He then went up to Trinity College, Oxford. He was a rather wild left-arm swing bowler who narrowly missed his blue as a freshman in 1912. He played for the Yorkshire Second Eleven in 1913. For York C.C. in 1914, he took 7 for 19 runs against Hull C.C. and also had some successful days for the Yorkshire Gentlemen.

Lister-Kaye played for Oxford in his second year, without winning a blue, and his games for Yorkshire came against the West Indies and Leicestershire. In all his first-class matches he took 37 wickets with his left arm medium pace, with a best of 7 for 117 for the "Europeans" against the Indians in Bombay. A right-handed batsman, he scored 149 runs at 11.46, with a best of 35 against the South Africans for Oxford. He also took eight catches in the field.

Lister-Kaye served with the West Yorkshire Regiment during World War I. Afterwards he transferred to the Royal Air Force, from which he retired in 1924. His elder brother had died in infancy, so when his father died in 1931 he inherited the baronetcy. During World War II he returned to the RAF with the rank of squadron leader.

Lister-Kaye died in February 1955, aged 62, in Tamboerskloof, Cape Town, Cape Province, South Africa.

Baronetage of the United Kingdom
| Preceded by Cecil Edmund Lister-Kaye | Baronet (of Grange); 1931–1955 | Succeeded by Lister Lister-Kaye |
