= Katherine Fryer =

English artist (1910–2017)

Katherine Mary Fryer RBSA
- Born: 26 August 1910; Leeds, England
- Died: 11 January 2017 (aged 106)
- Other name: Kate
- Education: Leeds College of Art
- Occupations: Artist; Teacher
- Awards: Hoffman Wood (Leeds) Gold Medal 1969

Katherine Mary Fryer, RBSA (26 August 1910 – 11 January 2017) was an English artist known for her wood engravings. She was the winner of the Hoffman Wood (Leeds) Gold Medal in 1969.

== Biography ==
Fryer was born in Leeds, England, and attended Leeds College of Art from 1926 to 1931, where she was first drawn to wood engraving. She became a teacher at Bath Academy of Art and a member of the Bath Society of Artists during the late 1930s. She pursued a career in art, teaching and exhibiting her work; working in Leicester Museum and Art Gallery for a while before settling in Birmingham during the 1940s. In 1958, her composition "The Road to Kilmurvey", which was based on her sketches from a trip to the Aran Isles, was hung in the Royal Academy (RA) Summer Show and later bought by the RA. Her work can be found in many public and private collections in the UK. She became a member of Royal Birmingham Society of Artists (RBSA) in 1966 and won the Hoffman Wood (Leeds) Gold Medal 1969 for the painting "Pigeon Show", depicting pigeon competitors at the Livestock and Caged Bird Show, Bingley Hall, Birmingham.

Fryer retired in 1970 and was then able to paint and draw full-time. She published a book of her memories and her wood-blocked engravings in 2000. She was still working in her 100th year when the Royal Birmingham Society of Artists (RBSA) featured a selection of her work in their exhibition Ten years at St Paul Square. Ten years earlier, at the age of 90, she held a one-woman exhibition of 72 works at the RBSA entitled One Point of View. She worked in oils, watercolours, drawings and wood cuts, and she attributed much of her skill to the rigorous technical and academic regime of her training at Leeds College of Art.

She died in January 2017 at the age of 106.

== Legacy ==
Fryer's work is in the collections of Leeds Museums and Galleries, Harrogate Museum and Art Gallery, the Royal Birmingham Society of Artists Gallery, the University of Birmingham, Birmingham City University and the Royal Academy of Art.
