= Edward Harrison (cricketer) =

English cricketer and squash player

Personal information
- Full name: Edward Ernest Harrison
- Born: 25 May 1910; Chichester, Sussex, England
- Died: 12 December 2002 (aged 92); Chichester, Sussex, England
- Batting: Right-handed
- Bowling: Right-arm fast-medium

Domestic team information
- Years: Team
- 1946–1947: Sussex

Career statistics
Competition	First-class
Matches	10
Runs scored	120
Batting average	10.00
100s/50s	–/–
Top score	23
Balls bowled	1,056
Wickets	17
Bowling average	29.29
5 wickets in innings	–
10 wickets in match	–
Best bowling	2/28
Catches/stumpings	2/–
- Source: Cricinfo, 14 January 2012

Edward Ernest Harrison (25 May 1910 – 12 December 2002) was an English cricketer and squash player. In cricket, Harrison was a right-handed batsman who bowled right-arm fast-medium. The son of Ernest Redford Harrison, he was born at Chichester, Sussex, and educated at Harrow School.

Harrison made his first-class debut for Sussex against Worcestershire in the 1946 County Championship, having played for the county during wartime matches. He made eight further first-class appearances for the county in that season, before playing his final first-class match the following season against Cambridge University, in what was his only appearance in that season. Predominantly a bowler who "bowled with indefatigable persistency", Harrison usually bowled with the new ball and took 17 wickets in his ten first-class matches, which came at an average of 29.29, with best figures of 2/28. With the bat, he scored 120 runs at a batting average of 10.00, with a high score of 23.

Following his brief playing career, Harrison served as the chairman of the Sussex cricket committee, having served on the committee itself from the 1940s. He played for the wandering cricket club the Sussex Martlets, where he was their secretary from 1950 to 1985 and then president. He subsequently became the vice-president of the Friends of Arundel Castle Cricket Club. Outside of cricket, Harrison also played squash to a high level, playing for England and twice winning the amateur doubles championship. In his personal life, he married Susan d'Esterre Hubbard, daughter of Gerald Napier Hubbard and Bertha Caroline Garnier, on 10 September 1936. Their marriage lasted until 1951, when they divorced. They had a son, born 1937. Harrison died at the city of his birth on 12 December 2002.
