= Robert Carter (RAF officer) =

- Born: 15 September 1910; Portsmouth, England
- Died: 10 November 2012 (aged 102)
- Military career
- Allegiance: United Kingdom
- Branch: Royal Air Force
- Service years: 1926–1964
- Rank: Air Commodore
- Commands: RAF Upwood (1953–55); RAF Grimsby (1943–44); No. 103 Squadron RAF (1942–43); No. 150 Squadron RAF (1941)
- Conflicts: Second World War
- Awards: Companion of the Order of the Bath; Distinguished Service Order; Distinguished Flying Cross; Mentioned in Despatches

Air Commodore Robert Alfred Copsey Carter, CB, DSO, DFC (15 September 1910 – 10 November 2012) was a senior Royal Air Force officer who served with RAF Bomber Command during the Second World War. He received a Distinguished Service Order for his leadership of No. 150 Squadron RAF in bombing raids against German battleships.
