= David Scott Blackhall =

- Born: 9 May 1910; Cirencester, Gloucestershire, England
- Died: 14 September 1981 (aged 71)
- Occupation: Radio host
- Years active: 1960s–1980s
- Known for: In Touch

David Scott Blackhall (9 May 1910 – 14 September 1981) was a radio personality, author and poet.

== Life and career ==
He was born in Cirencester, Gloucestershire on 9 May 1910 to George William and Annie Blackhall. After an accident in his teens, in which he sustained a detached retina, he lost the sight in his left eye. He underwent an operation in about 1943 to restore some sight in this eye, but the operation was unsuccessful. The eyesight in his right eye began to seriously deteriorate in the 50s and an operation for cataracts was unsuccessful, leaving him totally blind by age 45.

In 1961 his autobiography This House Had Windows was published in which he explained that it took him three weeks to learn the system of braille. The 'David Scott Blackhall Award for Services to the Blind' was named in his honour by BBC radio's In Touch programme, a programme which Blackhall first hosted. Another award started in Blackhall's memory was the Patients' Aid Association's David Scott Blackhall Memorial Award which would award a cash prize to individuals making a positive impact to the blind community. Another blind colleague of Blackhall's at Radio 4 was Jill Allen-King. Blackhall was also a member of Rotary International since 1935 and, in 1942, founded the Rotary Club of Elstree & Borehamwood.

In 1969 during one of his radio editions of "In Touch", he commented on a group of blind people who had climbed Mt Kilimanjaro, the highest mountain in Africa, and went on to say that Britain's highest mountain was Ben Nevis - if anyone was interested. It seemed they were, as he had a flood of letters from interested listeners who wished to make that climb. With the help of local people in the town of Fort William, a weekend was arranged at the Milton Hotel - appropriately Milton was a blind poet - and a group of 15 visually impaired men and women with local sighted companions and Blackhall at the helm, made the climb, arriving at the summit to the sound of the bagpipes, played by one of the group. It was a proud moment for him and the start of the Milton Mountaineers, who went on to meet annually to climb more of Britain's and Ireland's highest peaks. One of Blackhall's poems, "Prayer", is still recited by the leader of the Mountaineers at each summit. Other works of Blackhall's were Dark Is A Long Way, a radio play about his Blind experiences that was broadcast in Britain in September 1958. Blackhall hosted In Touch until a week before his death, on 14 September 1981, aged 71. He had three daughters: Anne (b. 1936), (Leader of the Milton Mountaineers from 1992 to 2005); Jane (b. 1940) and Susan (b. 1949) and was married to Edna (née Westwood).
