= William Boswell (cricketer) =

English cricketer and British Army officer

Personal information
- Full name: William Gerald Knox Boswell
- Born: 24 June 1892; Chelsea, London, England
- Died: 28 July 1916 (aged 24); Thiepval, Somme, France
- Batting: Right-handed
- Bowling: Unknown

Domestic team information
- Years: Team
- 1912–1914: Oxford University

Career statistics
Competition	First-class
Matches	14
Runs scored	756
Batting average	30.24
100s/50s	1/4
Top score	101*
Balls bowled	563
Wickets	14
Bowling average	24.50
5 wickets in innings	–
10 wickets in match	–
Best bowling	4/22
Catches/stumpings	2/–
- Source: Cricinfo, 1 January 2020

William Gerald Knox Boswell (24 June 1892 – 28 July 1916) was an English first-class cricketer and British Army officer.

The son of William Albert Boswell and Florence Helen Rotch, he was born at Chelsea in June 1892. He was educated at Eton College, before going up to New College, Oxford. While studying at Oxford, Boswell played first-class cricket for Oxford University, making his debut against the Free Foresters at Oxford in 1912. He played first-class cricket for Oxford until 1914, making fourteen appearances. He scored a total of 756 runs in his fourteen matches, at an average of 30.24. His high score of 101 not out, which was his only first-class century, came against Hampshire in 1913. With the ball, he took 14 wickets at a bowling average of 24.50 and best figures of 4 for 22.

Boswell served in the British Army during the First World War, being commissioned as a second lieutenant with the Rifle Brigade in August 1914, with confirmation in the rank coming in January 1915. He was promoted to lieutenant in July 1915, while in October 1915 he was made a temporary captain. Boswell died from wounds received in action at Thiepval during the Battle of the Somme on 28 July 1916.
