= Charles Frederick Lyttelton =

English cricketer and priest

Charles Lyttelton
Cricket information
- Batting: Right-handed
- Bowling: Right-arm fast

Career statistics
| Competition | First-class |
|---|---|
| Matches | 31 |
| Runs scored | 304 |
| Batting average | 9.21 |
| 100s/50s | 0/0 |
| Top score | 25* |
| Balls bowled | 4,730 |
| Wickets | 86 |
| Bowling average | 25.05 |
| 5 wickets in innings | 2 |
| 10 wickets in match | 0 |
| Best bowling | 5/33 |
| Catches/stumpings | 16/– |
- Source: Cricinfo, 7 November 2022

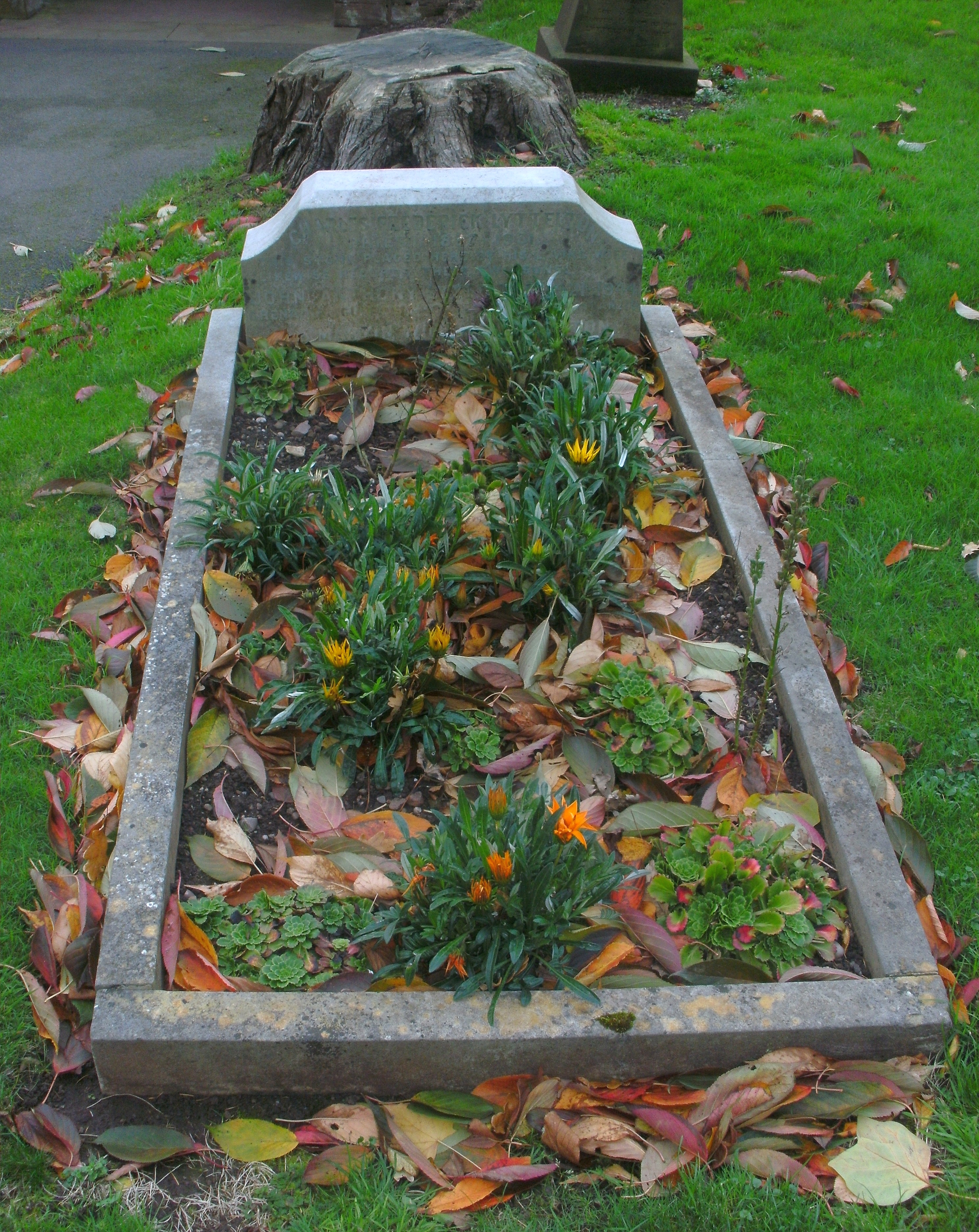
St John the Baptist Church, Hagley, grave of the Rev. Charles Frederick Lyttelton (1887–1931) and his sons

Rev. Hon. Charles Frederick Lyttelton MC (26 January 1887 – 3 October 1931) was an English priest and first-class cricketer from the Lyttelton family. He played 31 games for Cambridge University, Worcestershire and Marylebone Cricket Club (MCC) in the early twentieth century.

== Early life and family ==
Lyttelton was born in Marylebone, London, the third son of Charles Lyttelton, 8th Viscount Cobham. He was educated at Eton College and Trinity College, Cambridge, and became a clergyman. He served in the Royal Army Chaplains' Department in the First World War and was awarded the Military Cross in the 1919 Birthday Honours for distinguished service in France and Flanders.

In 1920, he married Sibell Eleanor Maud Kay-Shuttleworth (née Adeane), daughter of Charles Adeane and widow of Hon. Edward James Kay-Shuttleworth, (son of the 1st Baron Shuttleworth) who was killed in 1917 in a military accident. They had two sons, Lt. John Anthony Lyttelton (1921–1944), who was killed in Italy in the Second World War, and a son who died in infancy. John Anthony was also educated at Eton and was in the cricket XI in 1939–40.

His stepchildren were Charles Kay-Shuttleworth, 4th Baron Shuttleworth (1917–1975) and Pamela Kay-Shuttleworth, who married as her first husband Keith Rous, 5th Earl of Stradbroke.

== Cricket career ==
Lyttelton appeared in a minor match in August 1906 when he played at Stoke Edith playing for a team of the same name against "Gentlemen of the Netherlands" and took three wickets including that of Carst Posthuma. Two weeks later he made his first-class debut for Worcestershire against Gloucestershire, though he bowled only a single over (which cost ten runs) and managed 6 and 13 with the bat.

His maiden first-class wicket, that of Jack Sharp, had to wait until his next game, for Cambridge against Lancashire in May 1907. Lyttelton had a very good match, taking 2-26 and 5-33 (his best innings performance) as well as scoring 25 not out from number eleven. Cambridge recorded a crushing win by an innings and 204 runs, which remains their second highest margin of victory.

1908 was Lyttelton's most productive season, as in ten matches (all but one for Cambridge; the other was for Worcestershire) he took a total of 47 wickets, including 5–75 against Sussex. He won his blue that year too, his five wickets in the Varsity Match proving important as Cambridge beat Oxford by the narrow margin of two wickets. He also played against Oxford the following year (though he took no wickets), and played five times for Worcestershire, although he never claimed more than three wickets in an innings that summer.

Lyttelton played his last three first-class matches in 1910: two for Worcestershire and his one and only appearance for MCC, a badly rain-affected game against his old university in which he neither batted nor bowled. For his county he took three wickets in each of the two matches he played, with his final first-class wicket being that of Hampshire's Alexander Johnston. In this, his final game, Lyttelton captained Worcestershire for the only time in his career.

A very large number of Lyttelton's relations played cricket to a high standard: his grandfather, father, brother, five uncles and a nephew all made at least one first-class appearance, with one of those uncles, Alfred Lyttelton, playing four Test matches for England in the 1880s. Two of his brothers-in-law were also first-class cricketers.

Lyttelton died in Paddington, London, at age 44.
