= Eton v Harrow =

Annual cricket match

- Sport: Cricket
- Teams: Eton; Harrow
- First meeting: 1805

Statistics
- Total meetings: 189
- Most wins: Harrow
- All-time series: 60–61–68

The Eton v Harrow cricket match is an annual match between public school rivals Eton College and Harrow School. It is the oldest modern sporting rivalry between two schools, one of the longest-running annual sporting fixtures in the world and is the last annual school cricket match still to be played at Lord's.

In February 2022, the MCC announced that from 2023 onwards the fixture would no longer be held at the ground. It would be replaced by the finals of boys' and girls' schools competitions, as stated by MCC to be more inclusive. However, in September, 2022, following opposition from a section of its membership, the club decided that the match would be held at Lord's in 2023 to allow time for further consultation. In March, 2023 it was announced that the fixture would continue to be played at Lord's until at least 2027, following which there would be a review and a possible vote in 2028 on whether the match should remain at Lord's.

== Early years ==
Cricket was being played by teams at English public schools by the time of the English Commonwealth. Horace Walpole entered Eton in 1726, and later wrote that playing cricket was a common occurrence at the school. Westminster School played matches against Eton at Tothill Fields in the 1790s. By the early 19th century, cricket was well established in English public and grammar schools.

There is some evidence for earlier matches between Eton and Harrow, but teams from the schools definitely played a cricket match at Lord's Old Ground in 1805, probably organised by the boys. They moved to Lord's Cricket Ground for a rematch in 1818, and played again in 1822. From 1822, the match has been an annual event, with the exceptions of 1829–1831, 1856 and 2020. During the two World Wars it was relocated away from Lord's.

A triangular tournament at Lord's also involving Winchester – Public Schools Week – ran until 1854; it was emulated by matches of other schools, particularly Charterhouse, Rugby and Westminster. The schools were early adopters of cricket caps: Eton (light blue) and Winchester (blue) in 1851, and Harrow (striped) in 1852, followed by Cambridge (1861) and Oxford (1863).

The first Eton–Harrow match in 1805 preceded by one year the first Gentlemen v Players in 1806. Charles Wordsworth, nephew of William Wordsworth, played for Harrow in the four matches in 1822 to 1825, and arranged the first University Match at Lord's in 1827, two years before the first Boat Race. Many Eton and Harrow players went on to win blues at Oxford and Cambridge. Eton v Harrow was joined by the University Match and Gentlemen v Players as the three key features in the England cricket season.

== Heyday ==
In its heyday, in the late 19th century and early 20th century, "the Schools day" was one of the highlights of the London "season", alongside Henley Royal Regatta and Royal Ascot. The number of spectators necessitated the first introduction of viewing stands and a boundary rope at Lord's in 1866. The game made national newspaper headlines, and was attended by current and former students, their families and members of the public. The match in 1914 was attended by over 38,000 people during its two days. Even in 2008, the match attracted a larger crowd than any of Middlesex's first-class matches.

The influence of the Eton v Harrow match waned as the dominance of amateurs in cricket was replaced by increasing professionalism, noticeably after the First World War and to an even greater extent after the Second.

It was not just Eton and Harrow that played at Lord's. There was a group of ten schools called 'The Lord's Schools' which had fixtures each season. These were Eton College, Harrow School, Tonbridge School, Marlborough College, Rugby School, Cheltenham College, The Oratory School, Haileybury College, Clifton College and Beaumont College (now closed).

== Players ==
Many famous individuals and famous cricketers have played in the match. Lord Byron played for Harrow in the 1805 match, Field Marshal Earl Alexander of Tunis for Harrow in Fowler's match in 1910, Bolo Whistler for Harrow in 1916, Alec Douglas-Home for Eton in 1921 and 1922, Terence Rattigan for Harrow in 1929 and Henry Blofeld for Eton in 1955. Early prominent cricketers who played in the Eton v Harrow match include E. H. Budd, John Kirwan and Herbert Jenner (Eton); and Edward Grimston, Charles Harenc and Charles Wordsworth (Harrow). Between the 1870s and the 1890s, there were the Studd brothers, Bernard Bosanquet, Ivo Bligh, Martin Bladen (who later became Lord Hawke) and George Harris (who later became Lord Harris) (Eton); and A. N. Hornby, Archie MacLaren and Stanley Jackson (Harrow). Lionel Tennyson (later 3rd Baron Tennyson) played for Eton before the First World War, and Gubby Allen just afterwards. Around this time the prominent future amateurs for Derbyshire included Anthony Jackson, Geoffrey Jackson, Guy Jackson, Wilfred Hill-Wood and Basil Hill-Wood.

Other players who were later first-class cricketers were not selected for their school, including Charles Lyttelton (later 10th Viscount Cobham), Wykeham Cornwallis (later 2nd Baron Cornwallis), Nigel Haig and Denis Hill-Wood.

The match has included fifteen players from Eton and six from Harrow who later played for the England cricket team, most recently Nick Compton (Harrow) in Tests and Alex Loudon (Eton) in ODIs. In recent years, few players have gone on to become professionals in first-class cricket, exceptions being Compton, Gary Ballance and Sam Northeast from Harrow, and Jamie Bruce and Loudon from Eton.

Amongst the cricketers who became the coach at Eton or Harrow after their playing days, one was George Hirst, who coached at Eton for 18 years from 1921.

Harrow won the latest edition in 2025 by 31 runs. Harrow batted first and scored 282/8 in their 55 overs. Eton were always behind the run rate, the pressure told and they were eventually all out for 251. Harrow now overtake Eton as having won more matches.

== Results and records ==
- Excluding fixtures during the First and Second World Wars, there have been 183 matches in the series from 1805 to 2022, of which Harrow have won 61 and Eton have won 60, with 68 matches drawn.
- During the World Wars, matches were played at the two schools' own grounds rather than at Lord's. From 1915 to 1918, two matches were played each year, one at Harrow and one at Eton. From 1940 to 1945, one match was played each year, with the venue alternating. Of those ten matches, Eton won eight and Harrow one, and one was drawn. In 1970, Lord's was reserved for a Gillette Cup match, so the Eton–Harrow match was played at Harrow.
- The match was traditionally a two-day, two-innings affair, but in 1982 reduced to one day and one innings a side. It moved to a limited overs format in 1999, with a second longer match played away from Lord's. It celebrated its 200th anniversary in 2005.
- The highest innings total is 502 scored by Eton in 1923. Harrow reached 388 in 1900.
- The lowest innings total is Harrow's 24 in 1824. Eton were dismissed for 35 in 1855.
- The highest individual score is 183, scored by D. C. Boles for Eton in 1904. G. Wilson scored 173 for Harrow in 1913.
- M. C. Bird is the only player to have made a hundred in each innings, scoring 100* and 131 for Harrow in 1907.
- H. W. Studd recorded bowling figures of 14 for 99 for Eton in 1888. E. W. Blore took 15 wickets in 1847, and 14 in 1845, but runs conceded were not recorded.
- The teams in all of the matches have been limited to current pupils, except the match in 1857 which included some former pupils aged less than 20.
- The matches in 1997, 1999 and 2001 were abandoned without a ball being bowled.
- Harrow's win in 2000 was its first victory since 1975. Harrow also went without a win from 1908 to 1939: in 27 games, Eton won 12 times and 15 matches were drawn.
- In 2010, Harrow won by five wickets.
- Eton's victory in 2011 was their first for eight years.
- In 2012, Harrow scored their winning 274th run on the first ball of the 55th over, winning largely on the strength of L. Bose's 118 runs and H. W. D. Whitrow's 80 not out off 66 balls.
- In 2013, Eton won by 5 wickets.
- In 2014, Harrow won by 63 runs.
- In 2015, Eton won by 6 wickets.
- In 2016, the match ended in a draw.
- In 2017, Harrow won by 6 wickets.
- In 2018, Eton won by 114 runs.
- In 2019, Harrow won by 4 wickets.
- In 2020, the match was cancelled due to the COVID-19 Pandemic. Harrow hired Mark Ramprakash as Director of cricket.
- In 2021, Eton won by 4 wickets.
- In 2022, Harrow won by 86 runs.
- In 2023, Harrow won by 4 runs, with C.P. Nelson scoring 103.
- In 2024, Harrow won by 91 runs, with J.S. Madan scoring 110.
- In 2025, Harrow won by 31 runs.
- In 2026, Harrow won by 80 runs.

== See also ==
- Fowler's match
- History of English amateur cricket
- Overview of English cricket from 1816 to 1863
- English public school football games
