= Kent County Cricket Club in 1906 =

Kent County Cricket Club
1906 season
- Captain: CHB Marsham
- Ground(s): Canterbury; Catford; Tonbridge; Tunbridge Wells; Gravesend; Maidstone
- County Championship: 1st
- Most runs: KL Hutchings (1,454)
- Most wickets: A Fielder (172)
- Most catches: J Seymour (43)
- Most wicket-keeping dismissals: FH Huish (56)

Kent County Cricket Club's 1906 season was the seventeenth season in which the county competed in the County Championship and saw the team win their first Championship title. Kent played 25 first-class cricket matches during the season, losing only four matches overall, and only two matches in the 1906 County Championship. They finished equal on points with Yorkshire and Surrey but won the title on the percentage of finished matches won.

Wisden Cricketers' Almanack considered that there was a "general consensus" Kent were "the best county team of the year" and that they had "shown the most brilliant form", whilst The Guardian wrote that "a more brilliant team it would be hard to imagine". The title was sealed with a final game victory by an innings against Hampshire, the team's twelfth successive victory. Two of the county's players, Arthur Fielder and Kenneth Hutchings were selected as Wisden Cricketers of the Year in 1907 as a result of their performances during the season.

The Championship victory was the first of four by Kent during the Golden Age of cricket in the years leading up to the First World War. It was celebrated by the club by the commissioning of a famous oil painting, Kent vs Lancashire at Canterbury, which now hangs in the Long Room in the Lord's Pavilion.

== Background ==
After dominating county cricket in the early years of Queen Victoria's reign, the players who made up Kent's great team of the 1840s retired and by the 1850s the county had been reduced to often having to amalgamate with other teams to produce a challenging team. The formation of a County Club in Maidstone in 1859 and the amalgamation of this with the original Kent Cricket Club in 1870 to create the modern Kent County Cricket Club, provided the basis for re-emergence, although the club suffered from financial instability and Lord Harris's view was that Kent could not hope to compete at the level it once had throughout the 1870s and 1880s. When the County Championship was formerly established in 1890 Kent were initially able to finish only in mid-table.

The establishment of the Tonbridge Nursery in 1897 as a player development centre for young professionals was one of the key developments that lay the foundations for the successes of the pre-war period. The Nursery, which was run by Captain William McCanlis and set up and overseen by Tom Pawley, who became the club's general manager in 1898, provided coaching and match practise for the young professionals who, by 1914, had become the basis of the Kent team, gradually taking the place of the amateurs who had dominated the Kent teams of the 1870s and 80s. By 1906 around 60% of all appearances were by professionals, with bowlers such as Colin Blythe and Arthur Fielder forming the core of the Kent attack. Professional batsmen such as Punter Humphreys and James Seymour became an increasingly important part of Kent's batting lineup, coming together with a group of "gifted" amateurs to produce strong teams.

The Nursery began to pay dividends quickly and Kent finished third in the Championship in 1900. Mid-table finishes followed between 1901 and 1903 before the team finished third again in 1904 in the first year of C. H. B. Marsham's captaincy. A sixth-place finish in 1905 saw Seymour, Ted Dillon (who would go on to captain the county) and Arthur Day all score over 1,000 Championship runs and Blythe take 130 wickets. The season had also seen the debut in the Kent Second XI of a young Nursery professional named Frank Woolley.

== 1906 season ==
Kent started the season with a match against the MCC at Lord's which they lost by 69 runs. The first four County Championship matches of the season saw losses to Yorkshire and Lancashire, a draw with Essex and a sole win away at Sussex. These were the only losses the team would suffer in the Championship during the season and a run of four wins, including a one wicket win against Surrey which is generally considered the turning point of the season, and three draws led up to the visit of the touring West Indian team to Catford in mid-July. A victory by an innings and 14 runs was the first of twelve successive wins leading up to the end of the championship season.

Eleven of the matches won successively were in the County Championship, but despite the long winning streak Kent could not have won the title without Yorkshire losing at least one game towards the end of the season. On 25 August, with only two matches remaining in the season, Kent won against Worcestershire and Yorkshire lost by a single run against Gloucestershire. After a victory against Middlesex, the championship was clinched with a win in the county's final match against Hampshire. The match saw Kent score 610 runs, their highest first-class score at the time, surpassing the 576 they had scored at Worcester in July, and remains the highest total made at Dean Park. A loss in the Champion County match against the Rest in September at The Oval completed the season.

Kent scored quickly throughout the year at a rate that averaged 80 runs an hour, with a style that aimed to win matches rather than draw them. The core of the team was formed of professionals who had been coached at the county's Tonbridge Nursery and contributed around 60% of appearances during 1906.

=== Painting ===
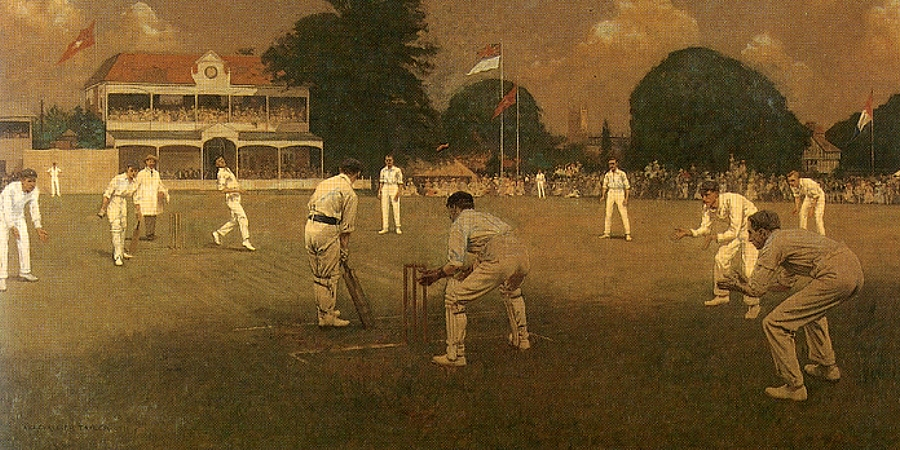
Kent vs Lancashire at Canterbury by Albert Chevallier Tayler, which was commissioned by Kent to celebrate their 1906 County Championship victory.

At a celebratory dinner in London in October, the Kent chairman, George Harris, 4th Baron Harris, suggested that the club commission a painting to celebrate the championship victory. Kent selected Albert Chevallier Tayler as the artist. Tayler was paid 200 guineas by Kent for the painting. Harris suggested that the painting should show an action shot of a match at the St Lawrence Ground, Canterbury, and suggested that the bowler in the painting should be Colin Blythe. Kent had only played three matches at Canterbury during the 1906 season and the match against Lancashire in July was chosen to be depicted. Blythe had taken eight wickets during the match which was part of the annual Canterbury Cricket Week.

The painting, entitled Kent vs Lancashire at Canterbury, remained at the St Lawrence Ground until 1999, at which time it was moved to the Lord's Pavilion as Kent could no longer afford the insurance. In 2006 the painting was sold to a charity foundation at auction for £680,000 and remains on display in the Long Room at Lord's on long-term loan.

== Players ==
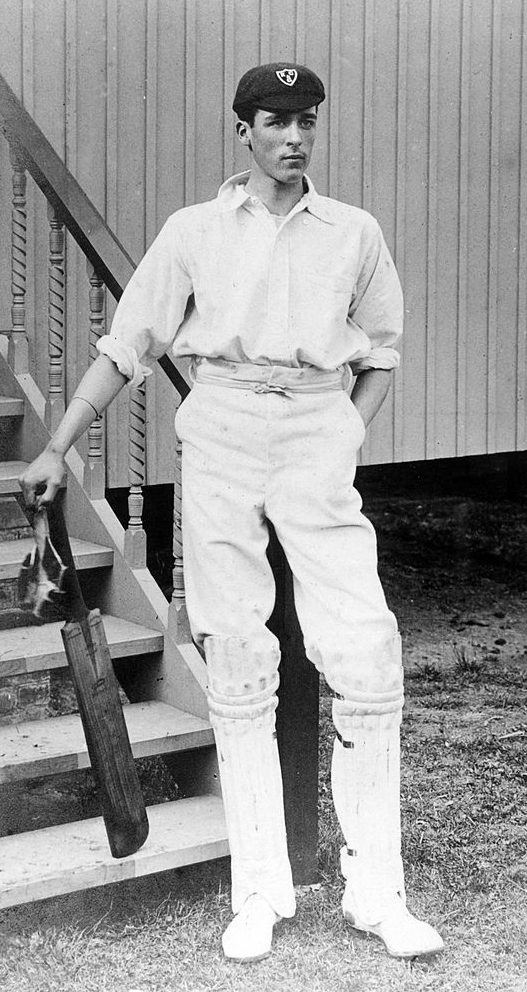
Frank Woolley, who made his Kent debut in 1906

The 1906 team was captained by Cloudesley Marsham and featured England international players Colin Blythe and Arthur Fielder. Blythe had toured South Africa over the 1905–06 winter and Fielder toured Australia in 1903–04. Both bowlers would go on to tour Australia in 1907–08 as would batsman Kenneth Hutchings who played his first full season in 1906. Fielder and Hutchings were selected as two of Wisden's five Cricketers of the Year in 1907 as a result of their 1906 performances. Future Kent great Frank Woolley made his First XI debut in 1906 and the team also featured Wally Hardinge in the early years of his career. Woolley is Kent's all-time leading run scorer and has made the most appearances for the County in first-class cricket, whilst Hardinge, who at the time also played football for Newcastle United, is second on both lists. James Seymour, who played in all 22 Championship matches during the season, is the fourth leading run scorer in the county's history and has made the third most appearances for Kent.

The team also included Jack Mason, who captained the team in the one game Marsham did not play, and Cuthbert Burnup, both past county captains as well as Arthur Day, who went on to be one of the Cricketers of the Year in 1910 and Alec Hearne who had been similarly honoured by Wisden in 1894. Hearne made his final appearance for Kent during July at the Nevill Ground. The main wicket-keeper was Fred Huish, considered to be "first of a line of exceptional Kent wicket-keepers". Woolley and reserve wicket-keeper and batsman Jack Hubble were both awarded their county caps during the season.

The season also saw the penultimate appearance for Kent of George Harris, 4th Baron Harris during the tour match against the West Indies. Harris, who was 55 at the time of the game, was a major figure in Kent and English cricket. Raymond Munds also played only one non-championship game for the county during the season, the opening match against MCC.

List of players

Ages given as of the first day of Kent's 1906 County Championship season, 14 May 1906.

| Name | Birth date | Batting style | Bowling style | Apps | Notes |
|---|---|---|---|---|---|
| RNR Blaker | 24 October 1879 (aged 26) | Right | Right-arm fast | 13 | |
| C Blythe | 30 May 1879 (aged 26) | Right | Slow left-arm | 18 | |
| CJ Burnup | 21 November 1875 (aged 30) | Right | Slow right-arm | 13 | |
| AP Day | 10 April 1885 (aged 21) | Right | Right-arm leg-break; Right-arm fast-medium | 11 | |
| SH Day | 29 December 1878 (aged 27) | Right | Right-arm fast | 1 | Won three England football caps in 1906 |
| EW Dillon | 15 February 1881 (aged 25) | Right | Right-arm leg-break | 9 | |
| WJ Fairservice | 16 May 1881 (aged 24) | Right | Right-arm off-break | 16 | |
| A Fielder | 19 July 1877 (aged 28) | Right | Right-arm fast | 24 | |
| HTW Hardinge | 25 February 1886 (aged 20) | Right | Slow left-arm | 5 | |
| Lord Harris | 3 February 1851 (aged 55) | Right | Right-arm fast | 1 | One appearance against the touring West Indian team |
| A Hearne | 22 July 1863 (aged 42) | Right | Right-arm slow | 12 | |
| JC Hubble | 10 February 1881 (aged 25) | Right | – | 9 | Wicket-keeper |
| FH Huish | 15 November 1869 (aged 36) | Right | – | 22 | Wicket-keeper |
| E Humphreys | 24 August 1881 (aged 24) | Right | Slow left-arm | 25 | |
| KL Hutchings | 7 December 1882 (aged 23) | Right | Right-arm fast | 18 | |
| CHB Marsham | 10 February 1879 (aged 27) | Right | – | 24 | Club captain |
| JR Mason | 26 March 1874 (aged 32) | Right | Right-arm fast-medium | 12 | |
| R Munds | 28 December 1882 (aged 23) | Left | Right-arm slow | 1 | One appearance against the MCC |
| J Seymour | 25 October 1879 (aged 26) | Right | Right-arm off-break | 25 | |
| FE Woolley | 27 May 1887 (aged 18) | Left | Slow left-arm; Left-arm medium | 16 | |

Source: CricketArchive and Cricinfo statistics

== Statistics ==
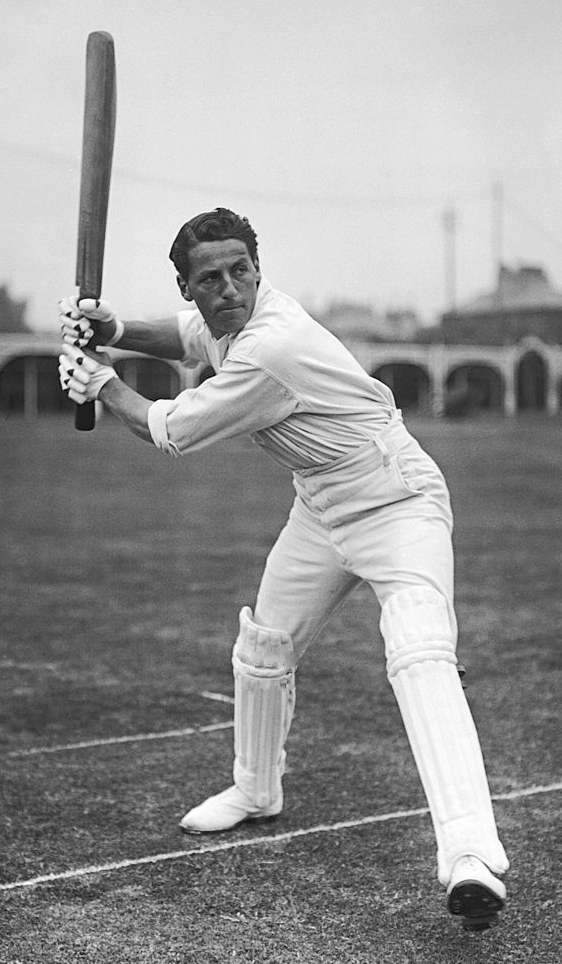
Kenneth Hutchings who led Kent in run scoring in 1906

During 1906 Kent played 25 first-class matches, including 22 in the County Championship. They won 17, drew four and lost four matches, including only two losses in the Championship.

| Match type | P | W | L | D | Tie | Ab | Pts | Pos |
|---|---|---|---|---|---|---|---|---|
| County Championship | 22 | 16 | 2 | 4 | 0 | 0 | 14 | 1st |
| Other first-class matches | 3 | 1 | 2 | 0 | 0 | 0 | – | – |

Kenneth Hutchings led the county in run scoring in his first full county season, with a total of 1,454 runs, including 1,358 in the County Championship. Both Cuthbert Burnup, with 1,116 runs, and James Seymour, with 1,096, also scored more than 1,000 Championship runs. Burnup led the County's Championship averages with 69.75 and made Kent's highest score of the year, 179. Both Burnup and Hutchings, who averaged 64.66 in the Championship, scored four centuries during the season.

Arthur Fielder was Kent's leading wicket taker in 1906. He took 172 wickets for the county during the season, including 158 in the County Championship at an average of 19.74. Colin Blythe took 90 championship wickets at 19.16 and 111 wickets in total for Kent during the season, despite not being able to play in seven matches due to an injury to his bowling hand. Both Fielder and Blythe took seven-wicket hauls during the season, as did Punter Humphreys who returned the best bowling figures of Kent's Championship campaign, 7/33 against Middlesex in June at Tonbridge. Fielder took 10/90 during the Gentlemen v Players match at Lord's, at the time the only bowler to take 10 wickets in an innings in the fixture, and took six wickets or more on 13 occasions during the season.

Fred Huish took 56 wicket-keeping dismissals for Kent during the season, including 41 catches and 11 stumpings in the County Championship. James Seymour took 34 catches in the Championship as part of Kent's well respected slip cordon. Fielder, Humphreys and Seymour played in all 22 Championship matches with club captain Cloudesley Marsham playing in 21.

=== Batting statistics ===
The table below includes all first-class batting during the 1906 season.

First-class batting
| Player | Matches | Innings | NO | Runs | HS | Ave | 100 | 50 |
|---|---|---|---|---|---|---|---|---|
| RNR Blaker | 13 | 18 | 1 | 672 | 122 | 39.53 | 1 | 4 |
| C Blythe | 18 | 25 | 3 | 245 | 53 | 11.15 | 0 | 1 |
| CJ Burnup | 13 | 21 | 3 | 1,207 | 179 | 67.06 | 4 | 6 |
| AP Day | 11 | 18 | 1 | 419 | 82 | 24.65 | 0 | 3 |
| SH Day | 1 | 1 | 0 | 3 | 3 | 3.00 | 0 | 0 |
| EW Dillon | 9 | 15 | 2 | 562 | 85 | 43.23 | 0 | 4 |
| WJ Fairservice | 16 | 24 | 8 | 294 | 61* | 18.38 | 0 | 1 |
| A Fielder | 24 | 34 | 19 | 166 | 28 | 11.07 | 0 | 0 |
| HTW Hardinge | 5 | 10 | 1 | 115 | 27 | 12.78 | 0 | 0 |
| Lord Harris | 1 | 1 | 0 | 33 | 33 | 33.00 | 0 | 0 |
| A Hearne | 12 | 20 | 0 | 553 | 154 | 27.65 | 1 | 4 |
| JC Hubble | 9 | 14 | 0 | 291 | 77 | 20.79 | 0 | 1 |
| FH Huish | 22 | 32 | 2 | 562 | 93 | 18.73 | 0 | 4 |
| E Humphreys | 25 | 38 | 0 | 977 | 122 | 25.71 | 2 | 4 |
| KL Hutchings | 18 | 28 | 4 | 1,454 | 176 | 60.58 | 4 | 10 |
| CHB Marsham | 24 | 34 | 3 | 733 | 119 | 23.65 | 1 | 3 |
| JR Mason | 12 | 18 | 2 | 649 | 88 | 40.56 | 0 | 7 |
| R Munds | 1 | 2 | 0 | 19 | 19 | 9.50 | 0 | 0 |
| J Seymour | 25 | 42 | 3 | 1,244 | 116 | 31.89 | 1 | 9 |
| FE Woolley | 16 | 26 | 1 | 779 | 116 | 31.16 | 1 | 5 |

Source: CricketArchive statistics and scorecards.

=== Bowling statistics ===
The table below includes all first-class bowling during the 1906 season.

First-class bowling
| Player | Overs | Maidens | Runs | Wickets | BBI | Ave | 5w | 10w |
|---|---|---|---|---|---|---|---|---|
| C Blythe | 886.5 | 243 | 2,209 | 111 | 7/63 | 19.90 | 10 | 4 |
| CJ Burnup | 24 | 5 | 79 | 1 | 1/56 | 7.01 | 0 | 0 |
| EW Dillon | 9 | 0 | 41 | 1 | 1/41 | 41.00 | 0 | 0 |
| WJ Fairservice | 388.3 | 93 | 1,081 | 45 | 6/42 | 24.02 | 2 | 1 |
| A Fielder | 1,104.5 | 230 | 3,535 | 172 | 7/49 | 20.55 | 17 | 5 |
| HTW Hardinge | 20.4 | 5 | 55 | 4 | 2/24 | 13.75 | 0 | 0 |
| A Hearne | 72 | 20 | 193 | 6 | 2/25 | 32.17 | 0 | 0 |
| E Humphreys | 356 | 72 | 1,104 | 33 | 7/33 | 33.45 | 1 | 0 |
| KL Hutchings | 100 | 24 | 372 | 12 | 4/73 | 31.00 | 0 | 0 |
| CHB Marsham | 7.2 | 1 | 30 | 1 | 1/0 | 30.00 | 0 | 0 |
| JR Mason | 245 | 77 | 646 | 31 | 4/16 | 20.84 | 0 | 0 |
| J Seymour | 7 | 0 | 44 | 0 | – | – | – | – |
| FE Woolley | 371.4 | 108 | 887 | 42 | 6/39 | 21.12 | 3 | 0 |

Source: CricketArchive statistics and scorecards.

== See also ==
- 1906 English cricket season
- List of Kent County Cricket Club seasons

== Bibliography ==
- Birley, Derek (1999). A Social History of English Cricket. London: Aurum Press. ISBN 978-18-54107-10-7 – via Internet Archive.
- Carlaw, Derek (2020). Kent County Cricketers, A to Z: Part One (1806–1914) (PDF). Cardiff: ACS.
- Lewis, Paul (2014). For Kent and Country. Eastbourne: Reveille Press. ISBN 978-19-08336-63-7.
