= McCanlis =

McCanlis is a surname. Notable people with the surname include:

- George McCanlis (1847–1937), English cricketer
- Maurice McCanlis (1906–1991), English cricketer
- William McCanlis (1840–1925), English cricketer
