= James Seymour (Kent cricketer) =

English cricketer

Personal information
- Born: 25 October 1879; West Hoathly, Sussex
- Died: 30 September 1930 (aged 50); Marden, Kent
- Batting: Right-handed
- Bowling: Right-arm off-break
- Role: Batsman

Domestic team information
- Years: Team
- 1900–1901: London County
- 1902–1926: Kent
- FC debut: 14 June 1900 London County v Derbyshire
- Last FC: 10 September 1926 Kent v Marylebone Cricket Club (MCC)

Career statistics
Competition	First-class
Matches	553
Runs scored	27,237
Batting average	32.08
100s/50s	53/131
Top score	218*
Balls bowled	1,260
Wickets	17
Bowling average	47.35
5 wickets in innings	0
10 wickets in match	0
Best bowling	4/62
Catches/stumpings	675/–
- Source: CricInfo, 11 April 2016

James Seymour (25 October 1879 – 30 September 1930) was an English professional cricketer who played primarily for Kent County Cricket Club in the early years of the 20th century. Seymour made 553 first-class cricket appearances in a career that lasted from 1900 until 1926, scoring over 27,000 runs in his career. He was the cricketer who established in law the principle that income from a benefit match should not normally be taxable in a case ruled on by the High Court in 1927. The judgement has had significant financial impacts over the years for other sports people.

Seymour was born in West Hoathly in Sussex in 1879. He died in 1930 aged 50 four years after he completed his cricket career. His brother John played first-class cricket for Northamptonshire and Sussex.

== Cricket career ==
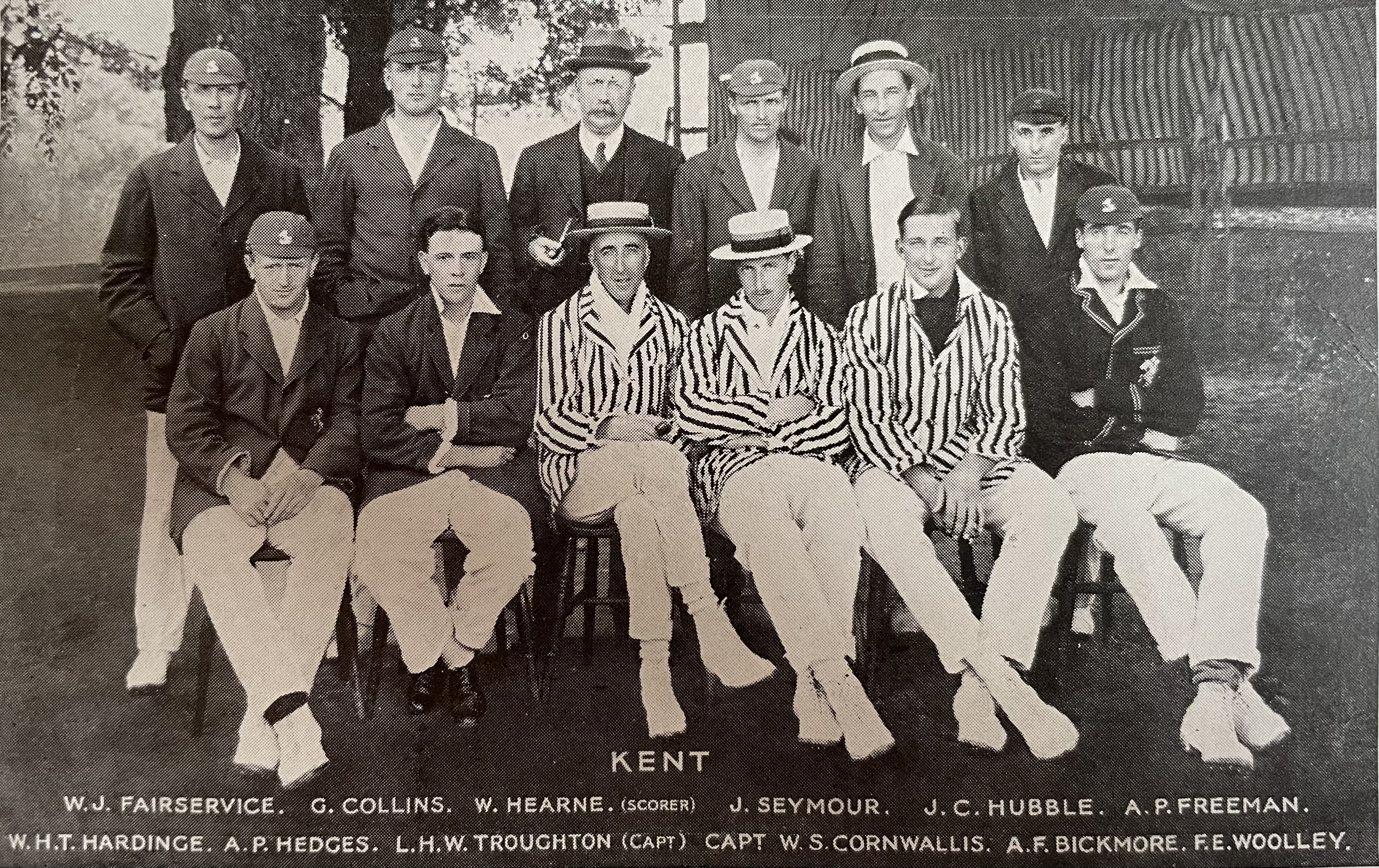
Seymour with Kent in about 1922

Seymour made his first-class cricket debut for London County Cricket Club in 1900 but played only three times and was offered a place in Kent's Tonbridge Nursery where young professionals were coached by Captain William McCanlis. He first appeared for Kent in 1902 having qualified for the county by residence, and was soon a regular, appearing at least 20 times each season until World War I and in all but two seasons until his retirement at the end of the 1926 season. A right-handed batsman, he was part of Kent's County Championship winners four times between 1906 and 1913.

Seymour scored more than 1,000 runs in a season 16 times, including in all four Championship winning years, and made 2,088 in 1913, 1,932 of them for Kent, at the time the second highest aggregate scored during a season for Kent to Wally Hardinge who scored 2,018 runs during the same season. He is fifth on the list of all time run scorers for Kent with 26,818 and scored 53 centuries for the County which remains the sixth highest number scored for Kent in first-class cricket.

Against Worcestershire in 1904 he became the first player to score a century in both innings of a match for Kent, a feat he repeated twice more for the county. His innings of 204 against Hampshire at Tonbridge in 1907 was at the time a record for Kent, a record which he went on to twice exceed, scoring 218 not out against Essex in 1913 at the County Ground, Leyton and 214 in 1914 against the same County at Tunbridge Wells.

Seymour holds the Kent record for consecutive County Championship matches played for Kent, appearing in 196 consecutive Championship matches for the County between 1902 and 1911. He was described in his Wisden obituary as an "indispensable member" of the team who "could never be left out", despite Kent having an excellent team in the years before the First World War. He appeared in 536 matches for the county, a total which places him third on the list of most appearances for Kent.

As well as being a high quality batsman, Seymour was an excellent slip fielder. He took a total of 659 catches for Kent in his career, second only to Frank Woolley, including taking six in one innings in 1904 against the South African tourists at Canterbury. As of April 2016 this remains a Kent record shared jointly with Stuart Leary who repeated the feat in 1958. He bowled off-breaks occasionally, taking 17 wickets in his career.

Seymour's final first-class match was in September 1926, appearing for Kent against Marylebone Cricket Club (MCC) at the end of the 1926 season. He made a total of 553 first-class appearances in his career, including three for the Players and toured America with Kent in 1903. After his retirement he coached at Epsom College.

== Benefit match and consequences ==
Seymour was awarded a benefit match by Kent in 1920. The match, which was a County Championship fixture, was against Hampshire at Canterbury. The game raised enough money for Seymour for him to be able to buy a fruit farm in Marden in 1923.

The game had important consequences for all county cricketers as the Inland Revenue used it as a test case in an attempt to define money raised by benefit matches or events as taxable income. The match had raised £939 but in 1923 the Revenue claimed that Seymour owed £3,752 in tax, including interest and penalties, more than he owned in terms of assets.

Seymour appealed against the judgment and the case went all the way to the House of Lords and in 1927 was eventually ruled in Seymour's favour. The case, known as Reed v Seymour, meant that sports professionals' benefits and testimonials, in certain circumstances, remained tax free. A government spending review in 2015 announced an end to the practice and that from April 2017 benefit events would be subject to Income Tax in the United Kingdom.

== Bibliography ==
- Carlaw, Derek (2020). Kent County Cricketers, A to Z: Part One (1806–1914) (PDF). Cardiff: ACS.
