= Colin Blythe =

English cricketer (1879–1917)

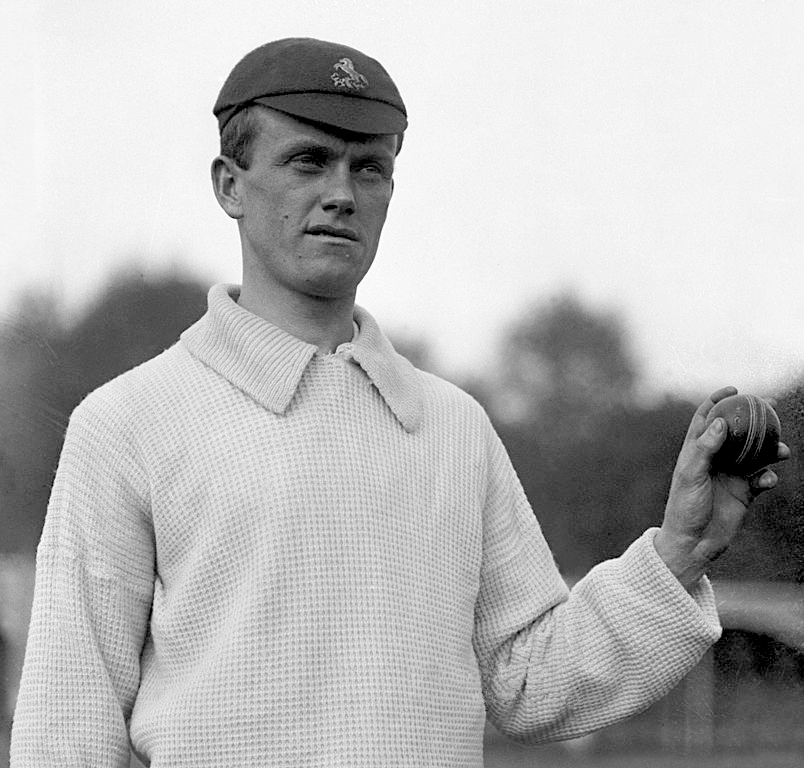
- Blythe photographed by George Beldam in about 1905

Personal information
- Full name: Colin Blythe
- Born: 30 May 1879; Deptford, Kent, England
- Died: 8 November 1917 (aged 38); Passchendaele salient, West Flanders, Belgium
- Nickname: Charlie
- Batting: Right-handed
- Bowling: Slow left arm orthodox
- Role: Bowler

International information
- National side: England
- Test debut (cap 130): 13 December 1901 v Australia
- Last Test: 11 March 1910 v South Africa

Domestic team information
- Years: Team
- 1899–1914: Kent

Career statistics
| Competition | Test | FC |
|---|---|---|
| Matches | 19 | 439 |
| Runs scored | 183 | 4,443 |
| Batting average | 9.63 | 9.87 |
| 100s/50s | 0/0 | 0/5 |
| Top score | 27 | 82* |
| Balls bowled | 4,546 | 103,546 |
| Wickets | 100 | 2,503 |
| Bowling average | 18.63 | 16.81 |
| 5 wickets in innings | 9 | 218 |
| 10 wickets in match | 4 | 71 |
| Best bowling | 8/59 | 10/30 |
| Catches/stumpings | 6/– | 206/– |
- Source: CricketArchive, 30 November 2025
- Military career
- Allegiance: United Kingdom
- Branch: British Army
- Service years: 1914–1917
- Rank: Sergeant
- Units: 12th Pioneer Battalion, King's Own Yorkshire Light Infantry
- Conflicts: First World War: Western Front; Battle of Passchendaele; Second Battle of Passchendaele †

Colin Blythe (30 May 1879 – 8 November 1917), also known as Charlie Blythe, was an English first-class cricketer, active from 1899 to 1914. Born in Deptford, he played for Kent as a slow left arm orthodox (SLA) bowler and a right-handed batsman. He played in nineteen Test matches for England from 1901 to 1910.

Blythe was one of the five Cricketers of the Year in the 1904 edition of Wisden Cricketer's Almanack. He is generally regarded as one of the greatest bowlers in cricket history, and is one of only 33 players who has taken 2,000 wickets in a first-class career. He shares (with Tom Goddard and Hedley Verity), the world record for the highest number of first-class wickets (17) taken in a single day's play.

Blythe was killed in the Second Battle of Passchendaele while on active service with the British Army during World War I. He enlisted in the armed forces at the outbreak of war despite suffering from epilepsy. A memorial at Kent's home ground, the St Lawrence Ground in Canterbury, is dedicated to Blythe, and to other members of the club who died on active service in the war.

== Early life and career development (1879–1898) ==
Blythe was born at 78, Evelyn Street, Deptford. His parents were called Walter and Elizabeth (née Dready). Walter Blythe was an engineering fitter at the Royal Arsenal in Woolwich. Blythe was the eldest of 13 children, seven boys and six girls, who were born between 1879 and 1902; twelve of them survived infancy. The family moved house four times while he was young, but all their homes were within the same close vicinity. Blythe attended Duke Street Infants School until he was seven, and then Alverton Street School until April 1892 when he was nearly thirteen. Thirteen was then the statutory minimum age for leaving school and, with the growing family needing an extra breadwinner, he joined his father at the Arsenal as an apprentice fitter and turner. He began studying for a Whitworth Scholarship in mechanical engineering, but suffered a breakdown in his health with the onset of epilepsy. He was forced to discontinue his studying.

Blythe's biographer Christopher Scoble refers to a "mythology" concerning his introduction to cricket and his early development as a bowler. It has been said that Blythe never played cricket at school and, aged 18, was "discovered" the first time he ever played by Captain William McCanlis. Scoble prefers a different version in which Blythe played both cricket and football on Blackheath as a member of a boys' club team. He accepts, however, that Blythe might have been eleven years old before he started bowling. According to Albert Kinross, Blythe played village cricket in his teenage years, and it is possible he played for "in-house" teams at the Arsenal.

Scoble says that Saturday, 17 July 1897 was "the day that changed Blythe's life". He decided to attend the final day's play in the County Championship match between Kent and Somerset at Rectory Field in Blackheath. At close of play on the Friday, the second day, Kent in their second innings were 246 runs ahead with three wickets standing (they went on to win by 213 runs). When Blythe arrived that morning, there was only a small crowd and the Kent all-rounder Walter Wright was in the nets looking for someone to bowl to him. He was the next batsman in and needed some practice before play began. Blythe later recalled that Wright called to him and asked if he would "bowl him a few". Blythe was happy to oblige and William McCanlis, who was standing nearby, liked what he saw. McCanlis offered Blythe a trial at the Angel Ground where Kent ran their "Tonbridge nursery", a training centre for younger players which became renowned for producing top-class cricketers, including Blythe, Arthur Fielder, and Frank Woolley. It closed in 1927.

Blythe was successful at the trial, and was immediately engaged by the club as a trainee bowler. He continued his engineering job through the winter of 1897–98, and joined the nursery ahead of the 1898 season, taking lodgings in Tonbridge. The regime at the Angel Ground was one of intensive practice, generally in the nets, with match experience being gained in local club cricket. It was here that Blythe learned the key cricketing skills such as line-and-length bowling and variations in the flight and bounce of the ball which he would deploy with great success in his first-class career. On Wednesday, 20 July 1898, Blythe made his début for Kent's Second XI in a two-day Second XI Championship match against Sussex Second XI at the County Cricket Ground, Hove. Sussex won by 8 wickets. Blythe bowled in the first innings only and took one wicket for 28 runs. He batted at number 11, last in the order, scoring 0* and 8*.

== Cricket career (1899–1914) ==
=== 1899—debut season ===
Blythe continued to make progress at Tonbridge through the 1899 season in which he took 105 wickets in local matches. On Monday, 21 August, he made his first-class debut for Kent in the County Championship match against Yorkshire at the Angel Ground, which he now regarded as his "home ground". Kent, whose season to date had been poor, surprisingly won the match by 8 wickets against the Championship favourites. Yorkshire, captained by Lord Hawke, won the toss and decided to bat. Somewhat sensationally, Yorkshire were quickly reduced to 18 for 3 by Kent captain Jack Mason, who took all three wickets for just one run. The situation changed when Frank Mitchell came in as, with support from Ted Wainwright and George Hirst, he began to punish the Kent bowlers. The score had reached 86 for 4 with Mitchell 55 not out when Mason decided to introduce Blythe into the attack. With his first-ever ball in first-class cricket, Blythe pitched it just off the wicket and it turned to beat Mitchell's lunge and remove his legside bail. He took another wicket in the second innings and retained his first team place in each of the three remaining matches. He ended the season with 14 wickets, including six in the match (three in each innings) against Surrey. The 1900 edition of Wisden Cricketers' Almanack described him as a "new and promising bowler".

=== 1900—first full season ===
Blythe played his first full season of county cricket in 1900, which was a wet summer. Kent's opening match was against Yorkshire at the old Private Banks Sports Ground in Catford and they lost by 131 runs. Play did not start until 4 pm on the first day. In the first evening, Blythe's first dismissal of the season was actually a catch. He caught Jack Brown off Bill Bradley and Yorkshire were struggling at 32 for three. They were soon struggling even more at 32 for four when Bradley returned the favour and caught Ted Wainwright to give Blythe his first wicket of the season. Yorkshire reached 116 for seven at the close. Next morning, they were all out for 163 (Blythe one for 40). Kent could only manage 112 in reply and Yorkshire progressed to 232 for five at the end of day two with Wainwright scoring a century. Yorkshire soon lost their last four wickets (Lord Hawke was injured and could not bat) on the final morning and were all out for 260 (Blythe two for 53) but this gave them a lead of 311 in difficult batting conditions. It was too high a target for Kent and they were dismissed for 180. The next match against Gloucestershire, eleven days later, was also at Catford and rain-affected. No play was possible on the second day and the match was drawn. Blythe, however, did achieve his first five wickets in an innings (5wI) in first-class cricket by taking five for 71 in the Gloucestershire first innings and beating his previous best return of three for 15 against Surrey in 1899. He then took three of the four wickets that fell in the second innings for only thirteen runs. Scoble said it was "a warning signal of what was in store".

The big event in Kent cricket in 1900 was the opening of the new pavilion at the St Lawrence Ground in Canterbury and there were no first-class matches at the ground until the start of Canterbury Week on Monday, 6 August, when Kent played Lancashire. At this point of the season, Blythe had taken 56 wickets in fourteen matches at 22.5 with just three 5wI returns. His first match at Canterbury was, Scoble says, "the turning point". In the last eight matches including the Lancashire one, Blythe took 58 wickets at 14.5 and reached a high standard that would be maintained for the next fourteen seasons.

In the Lancashire match with the pavilion now open, Kent won the toss and elected to bat. Play started on time but only fifty minutes were possible before the first day was washed out. Kent had made 23 for one. Following an overnight storm which demolished numerous tents around the ground, Kent resumed at lunchtime on day two and, in difficult batting conditions, were dismissed for 139 of which Jack Mason scored 73. Lancashire's batsmen struggled too, especially against Blythe who took six for 40, but they did gain a first innings lead of 19 before they were all out for 158. Kent reached 81 for one at the close. Their batting was much better in their second innings and, with play uninterrupted on the final day, they advanced to 279 all out for a lead of 260 but with just over a couple of hours left in which to try for a result. With an outstanding contribution from Blythe, who took five for 32, they nearly did it but time ran out and the match was drawn with Lancashire hanging on at 82 for eight. In his first championship match at the county headquarters, Blythe had taken eleven for 72. Blythe was given a standing ovation as he left the field and the Kent club members spontaneously "passed the hat" for a collection. This realised £7 1s 6d, a not inconsiderable sum, and that was presented to Blythe who was afterwards described the Kentish Express as "the hero of the match" and the "best colt of the year" who will become "the deadliest bowler in England".

Blythe made a great impression in his first full season, taking a total of 114 wickets at an average of 18.47 with his best innings return being the six for 40 against Lancashire. He took five wickets in an innings (5wI) eleven times in all and took ten wickets in a match (10wM) twice, including the eleven against Lancashire. Scoble commented that "the summer of 1900 marked the uncompromising arrival of Blythe upon the English cricket scene" and, largely because of it, Kent finished third-equal in the County Championship, their best performance for ten years. They tied with Sussex but were a long way adrift of champions Yorkshire and runners-up Lancashire, the two Roses counties having transformed the competition into a "two-horse race". Blythe was one of 17 bowlers who took 100 wickets in the season and, among these, his average was fifth-best behind Wilfred Rhodes, Schofield Haigh, Walter Mead and Johnny Briggs.

=== 1901 to 1903 ===
Blythe was less successful in 1901 as he took 93 wickets at the much higher average of 23.12. Even so, he was one of 24 bowlers who took 90 or more wickets in the season and his average amongst those was fourteenth. His best analysis was seven for 64 and there was one match in which he took ten wickets. Kent slipped to seventh in the championship with all the sevens: they finished seventh and they won, drew and lost seven each of their 21 matches.

Blythe made his first overseas tour in the winter of 1901–02 to Australia as a member of Archie MacLaren's team and made his Test debut in December. He played in eight first-class matches on the tour, taking 34 wickets at 20.91. His best return, and his only 5wI, was five for 45.

In 1902, Kent again finished seventh in the County Championship. Blythe had a much better season and was one of eighteen bowlers who took 100 wickets in the season. His tally was 127 at 15.47, his best seasonal average to date which placed him fourth overall behind Haigh, Rhodes and Australia's Hugh Trumble. He achieved 5wI twelve times and 10wM three times, his best analysis being eight for 42.

Kent dropped a place to eighth in 1903, but still managed a winning record of seven wins and seven draws against six defeats. Blythe was one of seventeen players who took 100 wickets. He took 142, his highest total to date, at 13.75 which was his best average to date. He was the third highest wicket-taker behind Rhodes and Ted Arnold; his average was second-best after Walter Mead with 13.67.

=== 1904—Cricketer of the Year award ===
In recognition of his exploits in 1903, Blythe was one of the five Wisden Cricketers of the Year in the 1904 edition of Wisden. The other four players honoured were John Gunn, Albert Knight, Walter Mead and Pelham Warner. In the dedication, Wisden prophetically stated: "As he is still under twenty-five the best of him may not have been seen, but even if he should only remain at his present standard of excellence he ought with ordinary luck to be a most valuable member of the Kent eleven for ten years to come". That is, to 1914, so Wisden was right. They were wrong, however, about his name because as they had obviously heard he was known by his nickname "Charlie", they assumed his given name was Charles and their dedication was erroneously entitled "Charles Blythe".

Kent improved somewhat and won ten of their 21 matches to be placed third in the championship behind Lancashire and Yorkshire. Lancashire were clear winners but there was little to choose between Yorkshire and Kent. The match in July between the two at Harrogate was declared null and void by the umpires following damage to the pitch by overnight vandalism after the first day's play. The umpires invoked Law 9 (illegal alteration of the pitch after the first day), but the teams decided to continue playing for the crowd's entertainment. Blythe was playing for Kent and took five for 125 in Yorkshire's first innings.

Blythe took 138 wickets in the season. This was the second-highest tally after Jack Hearne (145). Blythe's average of 19.60 placed him third behind Hearne and James Hallows. Blythe's best analysis was nine for 30; he achieved 5wI nine times and 10wM twice.

=== 1905 to 1906 ===
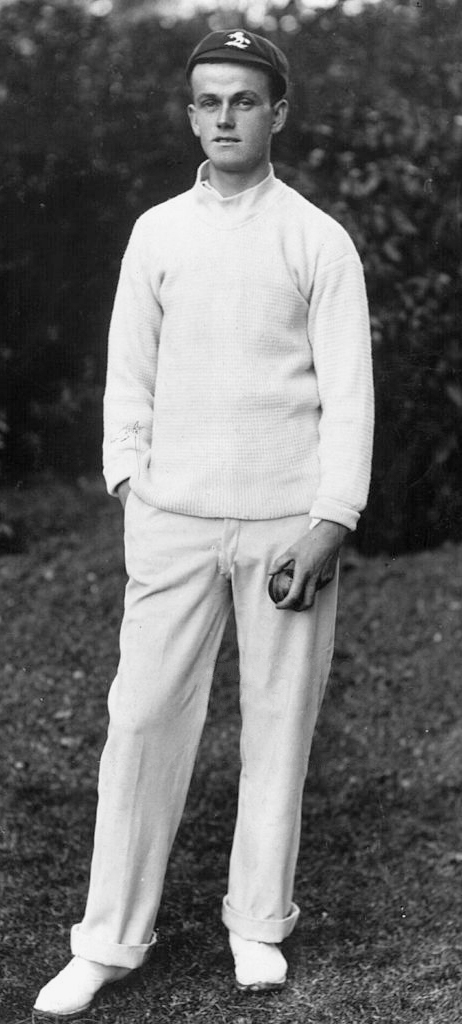
Blythe c. 1905

Kent won ten of their 22 matches and were placed sixth in the championship. Blythe took 149 wickets which was the sixth-highest tally but he was more expensive than previously, causing a higher than usual average of 21.08 which placed him eleventh among bowlers with 100 wickets. His best innings return was eight for 72. He achieved 5wI twelve times and 10wM five times.

Blythe toured South Africa with MCC in 1905–06 and played in eleven first-class matches. He took 57 wickets, more than five per match, at 18.35 with a best innings return of 6–68. He achieved 5wI four times and 10wM once.

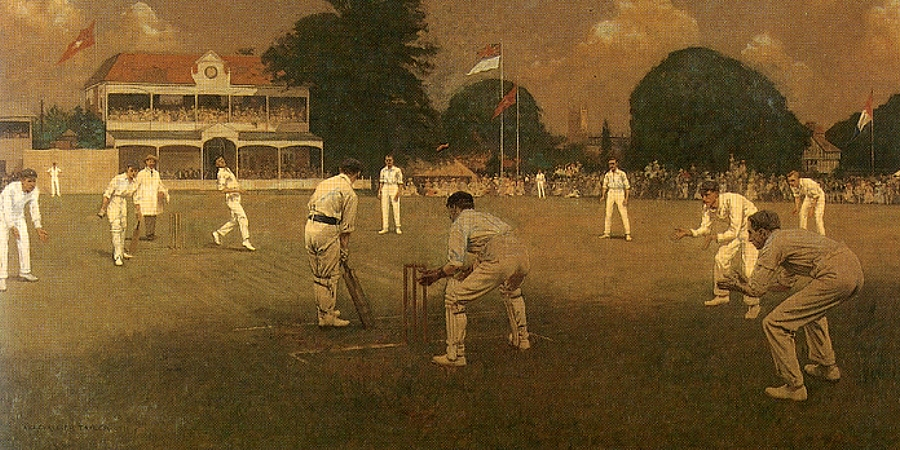
Kent vs Lancashire at Canterbury by Albert Chevallier Tayler. The painting was commissioned by Kent to celebrate their 1906 County Championship victory and features Blythe bowling to Johnny Tyldesley at the St Lawrence Ground in Canterbury.

1906 was a memorable season for Kent, as they won the official County Championship for the first time with a record of sixteen wins and two defeats in their 22 matches. The season had a dramatic finale. Surrey had made much of the running in the title race but their challenge faded after defeats by Kent at Rectory Field and by Yorkshire at Bramall Lane. These results left only Kent and Yorkshire in contention. Yorkshire were the favourites but, in a tense match at Bristol, they lost to Gloucestershire by one run, the smallest possible margin of victory. Kent, who defeated Worcestershire on the same day, now held the advantage. In the next round of matches, Kent and Yorkshire both won. That was Yorkshire's last game and so, in their final match of the season at Bournemouth, Kent had to avoid defeat by Hampshire to take the title. Kent did not just avoid defeat, they won by an innings and 37 runs, Blythe taking twelve wickets with six for 67 and six for 123.

Blythe took 111 wickets at 19.90 in 1906 with a best return of seven for 63. He achieved 5wI ten times and 10wM four times. He was fifteenth in the list of leading wicket-takers and a long way behind his colleague Arthur Fielder who took 186. Blythe's average placed him eighth among the twenty bowlers who took 100 wickets.

=== 1907—one of the best seasons ===
In the 1907 County Championship match at the County Cricket Ground, Northampton, Kent defeated Northamptonshire by an innings and 155 runs. Kent had batted first, having won the toss, and had then dismissed Northants for 60 and 39. The story of the match is that it was dominated by, first, the weather and then by Blythe. The first day was Thursday, 28 May, Blythe's 28th birthday. Play could not commence until mid-afternoon and then three hours were possible before more rain intervened. Kent won the toss, batted first and reached 212 for 4. On the Friday, no play was possible because of persistent rain. The weather relented on Saturday morning and Kent were able to continue their innings. Their tactics were simply to score as many as possible as quickly as possible and they added 42 in forty minutes to reach an all out 254 with more than an hour to go before lunch. On a wet but drying wicket, Blythe was in his element. He opened the bowling from the pavilion end and, in sixteen overs, shattered Northants with a career-best return of 10 for 30. Northants had to follow-on but, with Blythe taking seven for 18, their second innings lasted only thirty overs, so Blythe had taken 17 wickets in a single day's play. Frank Woolley was playing and he recalled in his memoir that Blythe was unlucky not to take all twenty wickets in the match (this has never been done in first-class cricket). He says Blythe was affected by dropping an absolute "sitter" off his own bowling but that was in the first innings, not the second. The first wicket in the second innings was taken by Bill Fairservice so the all-twenty goal was never on once that wicket fell.

Blythe's best Test bowling performance was eight for 59 (fifteen for 99 in the match) against South Africa at Headingley in the 2nd Test of the 1907 series.

Kent were unable to retain their championship title and slipped to eighth place in the final table, having won twelve of their 26 matches. Blythe had one of his best seasons individually, especially his performances at Northampton and Headingley. He took 183 wickets, the same as George Hirst, and only George Dennett with 201 took more. Blythe's average improved to 15.42 and placed him fifth among the bowlers with 100 wickets. His ten for 30 at Northampton was his best innings return. He achieved 5wI seventeen times and 10wM six times.

In the winter of 1907–08, Blythe made his second tour Australia, this time with MCC. He played in eleven first-class matches and took 41 wickets at 22.80 with a best return of six for 48. He achieved 5wI three times and 10wM once.

=== 1908 to 1910 ===
Kent had a very good season in 1908 and were placed second behind Yorkshire, who were unbeaten in 28 matches. The crucial match was Kent's season opener at Bradford Park Avenue where Yorkshire won by nine wickets. Only 249 runs were scored in the entire game. Kent also lost to Hampshire and Surrey in August. Blythe had an outstanding season and, for the first time, was the country's leading wicket-taker, his 197 putting him well clear of George Hirst (174). Blythe's average was 16.88 (seventh among bowlers with 100 wickets); his best innings return was eight for 83; he achieved 5wI twenty times and 10wM six times.

Having performed with great credit in 1908, Kent won the 1909 title in fine style, losing only two of their 26 matches. Blythe took 215 wickets, 48 wickets more than anyone else, and he was again the national leader. His average of 14.54 was second among bowlers with 100 wickets, behind Schofield Haigh's 13.95. Blythe's best innings return was nine for 42. He achieved 5wI 23 times and 10wM seven times.

Blythe made his second tour of South Africa in 1909–10, his last overseas season. He played in ten first-class matches and took 50 wickets at 15.66 with a best return of seven for 20. He achieved 5wI three times and 10wM once.

In 1910, Blythe took two hat-tricks in his career, both of them within the same fortnight at the end of June and the beginning of July 1910. Kent retained the title with a new but short-lived percentage system (wins to matches played) working in their favour. They won nineteen of 25 matches for 76.00% and were well clear of runners-up Surrey who won sixteen of 28 for 57.14%. Blythe took 175 wickets and was second after Razor Smith (247). His average of 14.26 was third-best among the bowlers who took 100 wickets, after Jack Hearne and Razor Smith. Blythe's best innings return was seven for 53; he achieved 5wI eighteen times and 10wM four times.

=== 1911 to 1914 ===
The 1911 County Championship was the first to award points for first innings lead and it created controversy for Kent who finished marginally second behind Warwickshire. If the 1910 system had been retained, Kent would have won a hat-trick of titles. The key match was their nine-run defeat by Surrey at The Oval in late August which, subject to Warwickshire winning their final match, decided the outcome. Blythe took 138 wickets at 19.38 with a best analysis of eight for 45. He achieved 5wI ten times and 10wM ten times. He had the seventh-highest number of wickets and the fifth-best average.

Kent had another good season in 1912 but championship success eluded them and they finished third behind Yorkshire and Northants, but as in 1911, they would have won the title under the 1910 percentage system. They won fourteen of their 26 matches. Blythe had his best season in statistical terms as he was both the leading wicket-taker and top of the bowling averages. He took 178 wickets at 12.26 with a best return of eight for 36. He achieved 5wI sixteen times and 10wM eight times.

In 1913, Kent won their fourth championship in eight seasons with twenty victories in 28 matches. Blythe again topped the bowling averages with 16.34 but his tally of 167 wickets was third-highest behind Major Booth (181) and Bill Hitch (174). Blythe's best bowling return was seven for 21; he achieved 5wI fifteen times and 10wM three times.

In 1914, Blythe's final season, Kent won sixteen of their 28 matches and finished third behind Surrey and Middlesex. Their last match was at Bournemouth against Hampshire and they lost it by an innings and 83 runs. This match finished on Wednesday, 2 September, a full four weeks after war had been declared and many players, including Blythe, had already enlisted in the armed forces. Blythe had made his final appearance at Lord's a week earlier, on 27 and 28 August, when Middlesex defeated Kent by 298 runs. Blythe took five 77 and two for 48.

In his last season, Blythe again took the most wickets and topped the bowling averages. His tally of 170 wickets was eight more than Alec Kennedy's 162 and his average of 15.19 marginally better than Alonzo Drake's 15.30. Blythe's best innings return was nine for 97; he achieved 5wI sixteen times and 10wM five times.

=== Career summary ===
Blythe was active in first-class cricket for sixteen seasons from 1899 to 1914, playing in 439 matches. He delivered a total of 103,546 balls and achieved 4,796 maiden overs. He took 2,503 wickets at a cost of 42,094 runs which gave him an average of 16.81 runs per wicket. He took 5wI 218 times, 10wM 71 times and 100 wickets in a season 14 times. His best innings return was the 10 for 30 he achieved on 1 June 1907 at Northampton (see above) and his 17 for 48 that day was his best match return.

As of 2017, Blythe is one of only 33 players who has taken 2,000 first-class career wickets and he is ranked 13th in the list, but he had a much shorter career than any of the first twelve. Among the bowlers with 2,000-plus wickets, his average of 16.81 is the sixth-best after those of Alfred Shaw, Schofield Haigh, Johnny Briggs, Brian Statham and Wilfred Rhodes.

In Test cricket, which for statistical purposes is part of first-class cricket, Blythe represented England nineteen times between December 1901 and March 1910, taking part in seven series. He delivered 4,456 balls and achieved 231 maiden overs. He took exactly 100 wickets at a cost of 1,863 runs for an average of 18.63. He took 5wI nine times and 10wM four times. His best innings return was eight for 59 at Headingley in 1907 and his 15 for 99 there was his best match return.

As a batsman, Blythe was never more than occasionally useful and was always a tail-ender who batted low in the order. He had 587 innings in his career and was not out in 137 of them, so he was dismissed 450 times. He scored 4,443 runs at an average of 9.87 per dismissal. He never scored a century but did achieve five half-centuries. His highest score was his innings of 82 not out at Trent Bridge in 1904. Like most specialist bowlers, Blythe fielded in the outfield and he held 206 career catches. He had 31 Test innings and was not out twelve times, scoring 183 runs at the average of 9.63. His highest Test score was 27 and he held six catches.

== Style and technique ==
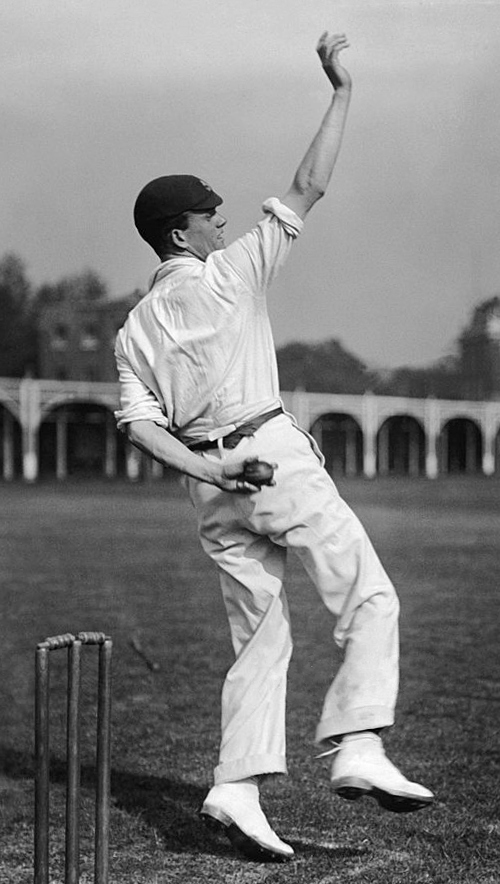
Blythe bowling c. 1905

Off the field, Blythe played the violin and Harry Altham, writing in Barclay's World of Cricket, said that his slow left-arm action "reflected the sensitive touch and the sense of rhythm of a musician", the left arm emerging from behind his back "in a long and graceful arc". Blythe, who had complete mastery of flight and spin, bowled consistently to a full length and made effective use of his fingers at the point of delivery to determine if the ball would be an orthodox break or a late inswinger, either of which was a difficult ball to face on a pitch that helped the bowler. Although he was ostensibly a slow-paced bowler, Blythe sometimes bowled an "arm ball" which was decidedly fast and, in general, he had more pace than would be expected.

In his Golden Ages, A. A. Thomson praised Blythe as Wilfred Rhodes' "historic rival as a slow left-hand bowler". Thomson declared Rhodes and Blythe to have been "the greatest of slow left-hand bowlers" but stated a slight personal preference for Rhodes. He qualified his opinion by admitting that many better judges, including Ranjitsinhji, considered Blythe to be "the more difficult to play (against)". As well as Ranji, all the leading batsmen greatly respected Blythe and Gilbert Jessop wrote in his book A Cricketer's Log that his particular bêtes noires as bowlers were Blythe, Monty Noble and Tom Hayward.

Blythe is depicted as the bowler in Albert Chevallier Tayler's oil painting, Kent vs Lancashire at Canterbury, commissioned by Kent at the suggestion of Lord Harris to commemorate the club's first official County Championship title in 1906. Harris made two conditions: the ground had to be Canterbury; the bowler had to be Colin Blythe. Harris' choice of Blythe for this honour is echoed in Altham's history: "But when all is said, it is the figure of 'Charlie' Blythe that stands out above his fellows as the greatest factor in the county's success".

Altham went on to say that Blythe elevated bowling "from a physical activity onto a higher plane" and summarised him as "practically unplayable" on a "sticky wicket". Technically, Altham says, Blythe's strengths were "the quickness of his break and rise (of the ball) from the pitch, combined with his perfect length".

== Personal life ==
Blythe met Janet Gertrude Brown, who was from Royal Tunbridge Wells, in 1906. She was called Janet by her own family but Blythe and everyone in his family called her Gertrude so, like him, she had two familiar names. Born in February 1889, she was ten years younger than Blythe. They were married on 11 March 1907 at the registry office in Greenwich. The couple lived in Tonbridge, not far from the Angel Ground. They had no children. Before his marriage, Blythe had continued to live with his family during the off-season. They had moved from Deptford to New Cross and he continued to work through the winter as an engineer at either the Arsenal or at the Maxim Gun Company, which was in Crayford.

Regarded as a sensitive and artistic person, Blythe was a talented violinist. He had played with a London music hall orchestra before his marriage, and afterwards with the Tonbridge Symphony Orchestra and other musical organisations in Kent. His preference was for classical music, especially that of Brahms and Mozart.

Blythe suffered from epilepsy, the onset of which may have been during his teenage years. It was after his marriage in 1907 that there are records of his condition which may have been exacerbated by competing responsibilities at home and on the cricket field. Altham recounts how Blythe was "utterly exhausted" after the Headingley Test in 1907 when he took 15 wickets in the match.

== Military service and death ==
Despite his epilepsy, Blythe still enlisted as a soldier in the British Army when the Great War broke out in August 1914. He had intended to announce his retirement from cricket at the end of the 1914 season, and he confirmed it in September after the season had been brought to a premature close.

Initially, Blythe enlisted in the Kent Fortress Royal Engineers (Fortress Engineers) as a member of the No. 1 Reserve Company. This was in Tonbridge at the end of August. Bill Fairservice, Wally Hardinge and Northamptonshire's Claud Woolley (brother of Frank) were also in the Fortress Engineers. In 1917, because of heavy losses in the Battle of the Somme, the army began to move men from Royal Engineers (RE) units into combat units. In August, Blythe was posted to an RE camp at Marlow for combat training. The authorities were by this time encouraging charity cricket matches and on Saturday, 18 August, Blythe played for an Army and Navy team at Lord's against a combined Australian and South African team. It was to be his last-ever match. Accepting that he would not play first-class cricket again, he agreed to become coach of cricket at Eton College after the war ended.

Soon afterwards, Blythe was posted to the 12th Pioneer Battalion of the King's Own Yorkshire Light Infantry (KOYLI), which had been raised in Leeds and mostly consisted of Yorkshire miners. He attained the rank of sergeant. Working in the Ypres sector of the Western Front, the battalion was mainly engaged in laying and maintaining light railway lines to allow easy passage of men, equipment and munitions across the area. On 8 November 1917, during the Battle of Passchendaele, Blythe was working on a railway line between Pimmern and Forest Hall near Passendale when he was killed instantly after shrapnel from a shell burst pierced his chest.

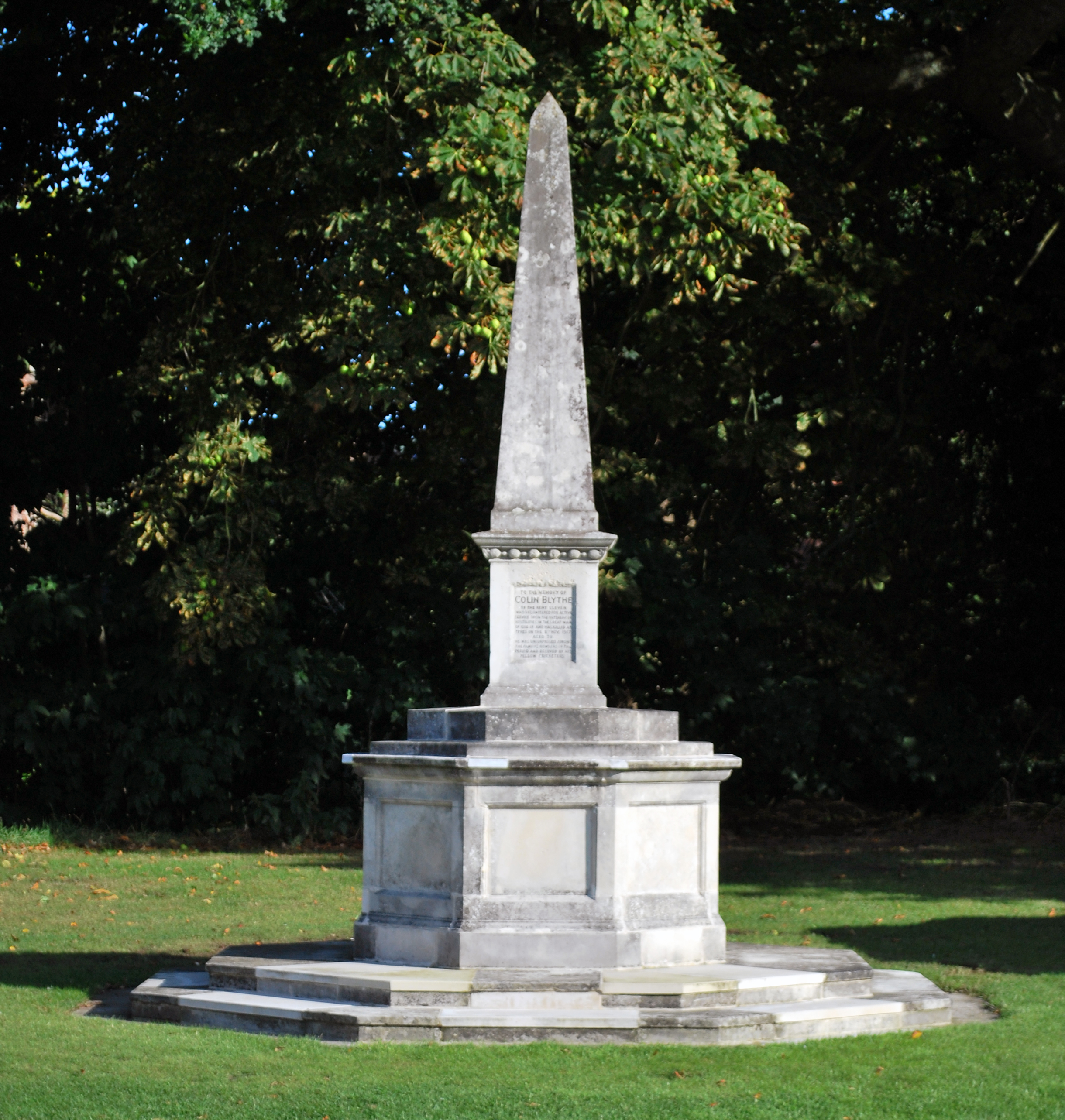
A war memorial for Blythe, located at the St Lawrence Ground in Canterbury, England.

He is buried in the Oxford Road Commonwealth War Graves Commission Cemetery, near Ypres (Ieper) in Belgium. Like his Kent and England colleague Frank Woolley, Blythe is commemorated in Tonbridge Parish Church and has a road in North Tonbridge named after him. There is a memorial to him at the St Lawrence Ground, now more popularly known as the Spitfire Ground. Inscribed in block letters on the west face of the plinth is the dedication: "To the memory of Colin Blythe of the Kent Eleven who volunteered for active service upon the outbreak of hostilities in the Great War of 1914–18 and was killed at Ypres on the 18th (sic) Nov 1917. Aged 38 he was unsurpassed among the famous bowlers of the period and beloved by his fellow cricketers". The date is wrong: Blythe was killed on the 8th.

In 2009, when the England cricket team visited the Flanders war graves, they laid a stone cricket ball at Blythe's grave. England's then captain Andrew Strauss said: "It was a deeply moving and humbling experience".

== Bibliography ==
- Altham, H. S.; Swanton, E. W. (1962). A History of Cricket, Volume 1 (to 1914) (5th ed.). London: George Allen & Unwin. OCLC 894274808.
- Barclays (1986). Swanton, E. W.; Plumptre, George; Woodcock, John (eds.). Barclays World of Cricket. London: HarperCollins. ISBN 978-00-02181-93-8.
- Lazenby, John (2005). Test of Time. John Murray. ISBN 978-07-19566-52-3.
- Scoble, Christopher (2005). Colin Blythe: Lament for a Legend. SportsBooks Limited. ISBN 978-18-99807-31-4.
- Thomson, A. A. (1962). Cricket: The Golden Ages. Sportsman's Book Club. OCLC 9304918.
- Warner, Pelham (1946). Lords: 1787–1945. London: Harrap. OCLC 877106024.
- Webber, Roy (1957). The County Cricket Championship: A history of the competition from 1873 to the present day. Charing Cross, London: Phoenix House Ltd. OCLC 2853776.
- Woolley, Frank (1936). The King of Games. London: Stanley Paul. OCLC 181745404.
