= Jack Hubble =

English cricketer (1881–1965)

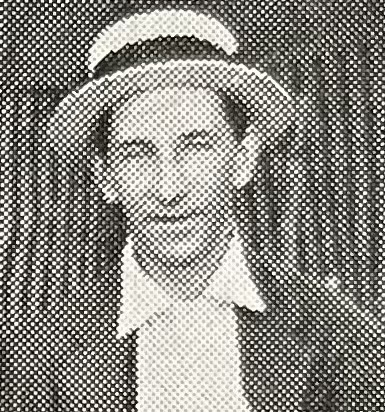

Personal information
- Full name: John Charlton Hubble
- Born: 10 February 1881; Wateringbury, Kent
- Died: 26 February 1965 (aged 84); St Leonards-on-Sea, Sussex
- Batting: Right-handed
- Role: Wicket-keeper
- Relatives: Harold Hubble (nephew)

Domestic team information
- Years: Team
- 1904–1929: Kent
- FC debut: 23 June 1904 Kent v Gloucestershire
- Last FC: 20 July 1929 Marylebone Cricket Club (MCC) v Royal Navy

Career statistics
Competition	First-class
Matches	360
Runs scored	10,939
Batting average	23.57
100s/50s	5/58
Top score	189
Balls bowled	36
Wickets	0
Bowling average	–
5 wickets in innings	–
10 wickets in match	–
Best bowling	–
Catches/stumpings	437/221
- Source: CricInfo, 6 January 2009

John Charlton Hubble (10 February 1881 – 26 February 1965), known as Jack Hubble, was an English professional cricketer who played first-class cricket for Kent County Cricket Club in the first half of the 20th century. He was a right-handed batsman and wicket-keeper who played professionally for 25 years and was part of the Kent teams which won four County Championships before World War I.

== Cricket career ==
Hubble joined Kent as a First XI player in 1904, making his debut against Gloucestershire at the Angel Ground in Tonbridge where he had been part of the Tonbridge Nursery, Kent's turn-of-the-century training ground for young professionals under Captain William McCanlis. He played few matches for the First XI initially and was used mainly as a batsman, the wicket-keeping position being held by Fred Huish in the years before the First World War. He played nine times in the 1906 team which won the County Championship for the first time in the club's history, but did not play more than ten games until 1910.

Hubble played a more important part for Kent from 1910 to 1914, playing in 30 matches in 1913 as the County won the last of their four County Championship titles of the Golden Age of cricket. Huish retired after the 1914 season and when first-class cricket returned after the war Hubble became the first choice wicket-keeper. He continued to play regularly until the end of the 1926 County Championship season when Les Ames succeeded him as the main wicket-keeper. Between them Huish, Hubble and Ames are considered the first in the line of great Kent wicket-keepers. The three men filled the role for Kent for half a century.

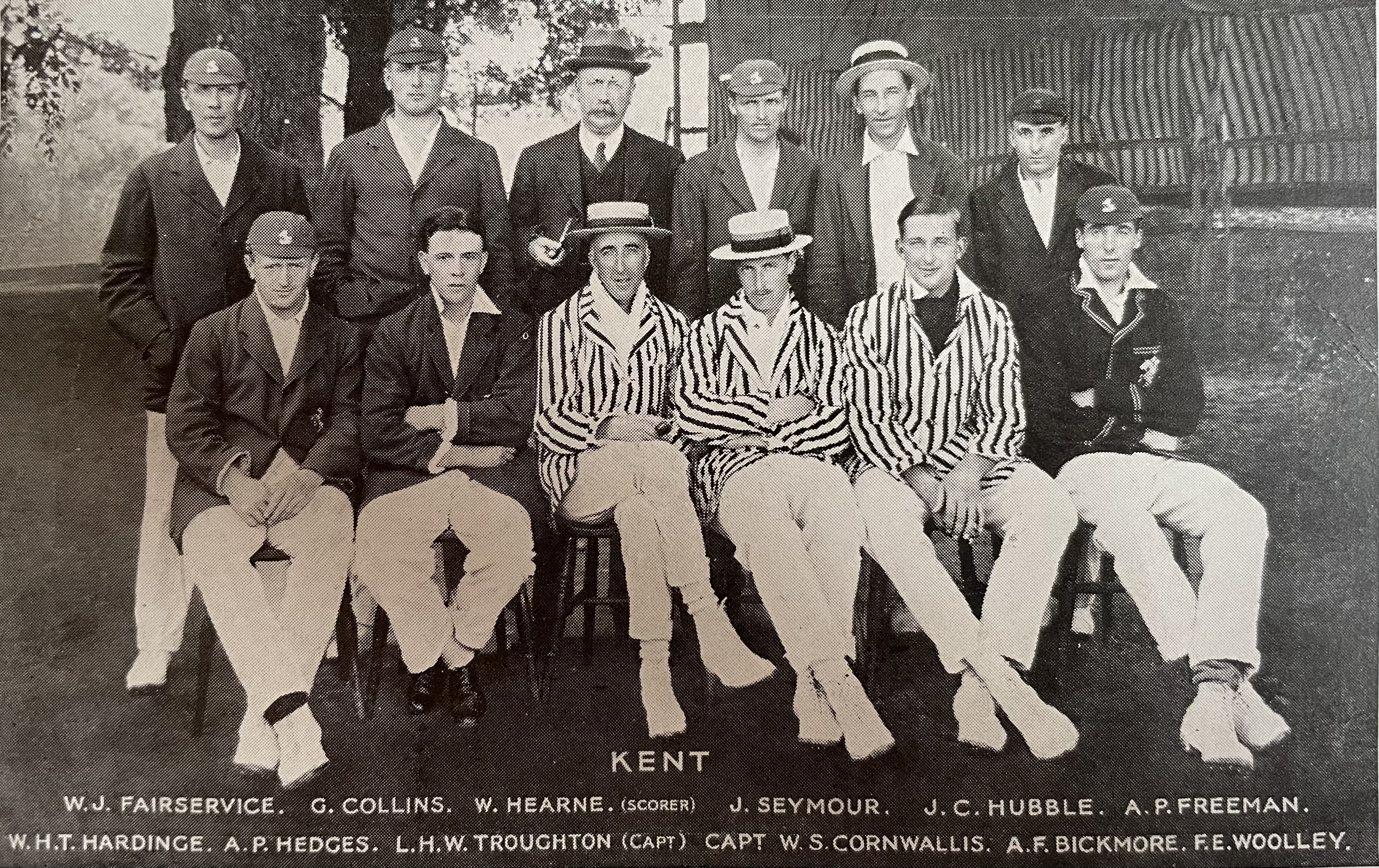
Kent Cricket Team c1922

Hubble played ten times for Kent in the 1927 season, before playing for MCC in South Africa. Hubble was not a member of the MCC tour party but was coaching in South Africa at Dale College and Queen's College during the tour. He was invited to play in a first-class match for Marylebone Cricket Club (MCC) against a South African Invitational XI at Benoni in December. He never played international cricket, although he is often considered to be unlucky not to have done so. He played just five first-class matches in 1928 and 1929 combined, ending his first-class career playing for MCC against the Royal Navy in July 1929.

As a wicket-keeper, Hubble made over 200 stumpings during his career. He dismissed ten batsmen in a match in 1923 against Gloucestershire at College Ground, Cheltenham, a Kent record that as of April 2016 he still holds jointly with Huish. He contributed to over 500 dismissals as a wicket-keeper and took a total of 437 catches in his career, with his best season behind the stumps being 78 dismissals in 1926.

As a batsman Hubble scored more than 10,000 runs for Kent and was considered a "beautiful exponent of off-side strokes". He could score quickly at times, his highest score of 189 being made in less than three hours at Tunbridge Wells in 1911. He only scored five centuries during his career but of Kent's main wicket-keepers only Ames and Alan Knott have, as of April 2016, scored more runs for the county.

== Later life ==
Hubble set up a sports goods business in Maidstone in 1910. He joined forces with former teammates Les Ames and Tich Freeman after the Second World War, setting up stores under the names Hubble and Ames in Gillingham and Hubble and Freeman in Canterbury and Maidstone. The company later merged with Readers who manufactured cricket balls and was eventually taken over by Kookaburra Sport. The stores closed in 2012.

Hubble coached cricket in South Africa for a number of years and after retirement became a qualified umpire. He died in 1965 aged 84. Hubble's nephew, Harold Hubble, also played first-class cricket for Kent for three seasons.

== Bibliography ==
- Birley, Derek (1999). A Social History of English Cricket. London: Aurum Press. ISBN 978-18-54107-10-7 – via Internet Archive.
- Carlaw, Derek (2020). Kent County Cricketers, A to Z: Part One (1806–1914) (PDF). Cardiff: ACS.
- Lewis, Paul (2014). For Kent and Country. Eastbourne: Reveille Press. ISBN 978-19-08336-63-7.
