= 1906 County Championship =

English cricket tournament

- Cricket format: First-class cricket (3 days)
- Tournament format: League system
- Champions: Kent (1st title)
- Participants: 16
- Most runs: Tom Hayward (2,814 for Surrey)
- Most wickets: George Hirst (182 for Yorkshire)

Location of the home ground of each county

The 1906 County Championship was the 17th officially organised running of the County Championship, and ran from 3 May to 30 August 1906. Kent won its first championship title, while the previous season's winners, Yorkshire, finished in second place.

== Table ==
- One point was awarded for a win, and one point was taken away for each loss. Final placings were decided by dividing the number of points earned by the number of completed matches (i.e. those that ended in a win or a loss), and multiplying by 100.

Team	Pld	W	L	D	Pts	Fin	%Fin
Kent	22	16	2	4	14	18	77.77
Yorkshire	28	17	3	8	14	20	70.00
Surrey	28	18	4	6	14	22	63.63
Lancashire	26	15	6	5	9	21	42.85
Nottinghamshire	20	9	4	7	5	13	38.46
Warwickshire	20	7	4	9	3	11	27.27
Essex	22	9	6	7	3	15	20.00
Hampshire	20	7	9	4	-2	16	–12.50
Gloucestershire	20	6	10	4	-4	16	–25.00
Sussex	24	6	12	6	-6	18	–33.33
Middlesex	18	4	10	4	–6	14	–42.85
Northamptonshire	16	4	10	2	–6	14	–42.85
Somerset	18	4	10	4	–6	14	–42.85
Worcestershire	20	2	8	10	–6	10	–60.00
Leicestershire	22	3	14	5	–11	17	–64.70
Derbyshire	20	2	17	1	–15	19	–78.94

== Records ==
=== Batting ===
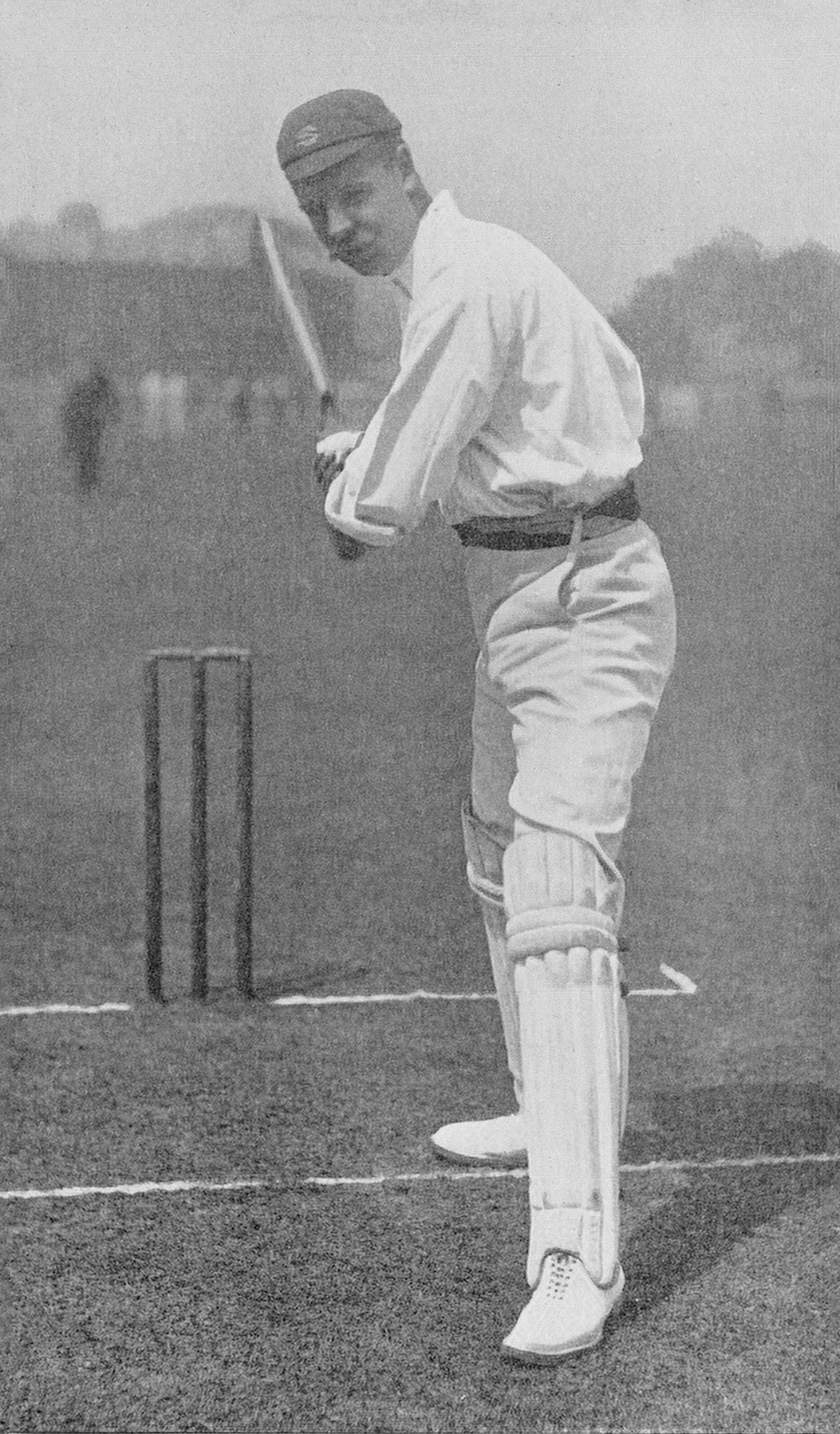
Tom Hayward scored the most runs recorded in a single County Championship season, as well as scoring nearly 1,000 runs more than the next leading run-scorer in 1906.

Most runs
Aggregate	Average	Player	County
2,814	70.35	Tom Hayward	Surrey
1,873	46.82	Johnny Tyldesley	Lancashire
1,771	43.19	George Hirst	Yorkshire
1,767	49.08	Percy Perrin	Essex
1,751	41.69	Jack Hobbs	Surrey

=== Bowling ===
Most wickets
Aggregate	Average	Player	County
182	14.84	George Hirst	Yorkshire
160	17.97	George Dennett	Gloucestershire
158	19.74	Arthur Fielder	Kent
154	20.25	Walter Lees	Surrey
138	13.53	Schofield Haigh	Yorkshire

== See also ==
- 1906 English cricket season
- Kent County Cricket Club in 1906
