= Wally Hardinge =

English sportsman

Personal information
- Full name: Harold Thomas William Hardinge
- Born: 25 February 1886; Greenwich, Kent, England
- Died: 8 May 1965 (aged 79); Cambridge, England
- Batting: Right-handed
- Bowling: Slow left-arm orthodox

International information
- National side: England
- Only Test (cap 201): 2 July 1921 v Australia

Domestic team information
- Years: Team
- 1902–1933: Kent

Career statistics
Competition	Test	First-class
Matches	1	623
Runs scored	30	33,519
Batting average	15.00	36.51
100s/50s	0/0	75/158
Top score	25	263*
Balls bowled	0	24,522
Wickets	–	371
Bowling average	–	26.48
5 wickets in innings	–	8
10 wickets in match	–	1
Best bowling	–	7/64
Catches/stumpings	0/–	297/–
- Source: CricInfo, 29 December 2008
Association football career
- Height: 5 ft 8 1/2 in (1.74 m)
- Position: Inside forward
Senior career*
Years	Team	Apps	(Gls)
- Eltham
- Tonbridge
- Maidstone United
1905–1906	Newcastle United	9	(1)
1907–1913	Sheffield United	147	(45)
1913–1920	Woolwich Arsenal	54	(14)
Total		210	(60)
Managerial career
- 1935: Tottenham Hotspur (caretaker)
- * Club domestic league appearances and goals

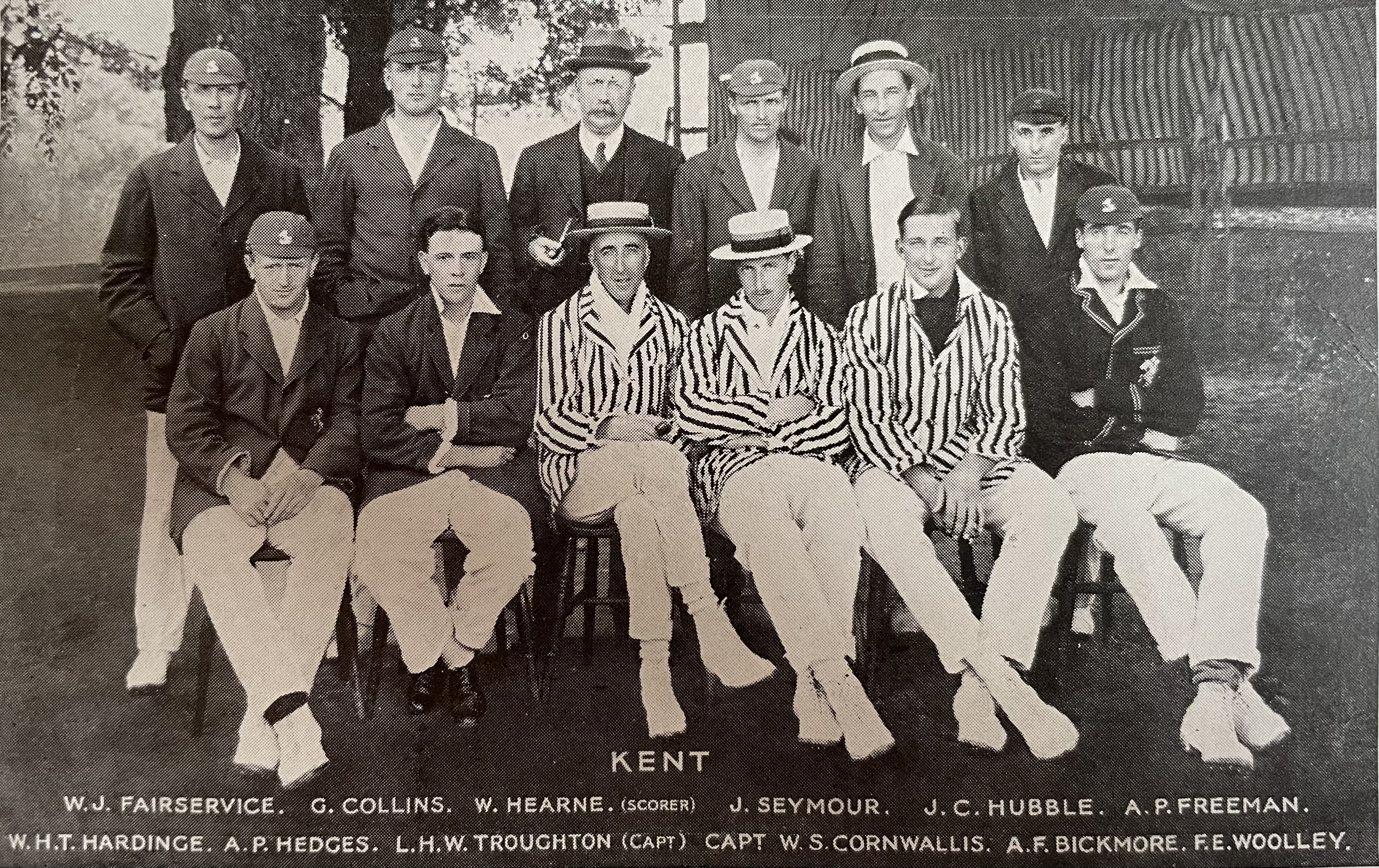
Hardinge with the Kent team of about 1922

Harold Thomas William Hardinge (25 February 1886 – 8 May 1965), known as Wally Hardinge, was an English professional sportsman who played both cricket and association football for England. His professional cricket career lasted from 1902 to 1933 during which he played first-class cricket for Kent County Cricket Club and made one Test match appearance for England. He was described as being "for years ... one of the leading opening batsmen in England".

He played football at the top domestic level between 1905 and 1921 for Newcastle United, Sheffield United and Arsenal and also made a single international appearance for England in that sport. He briefly managed Tottenham Hotspur after he retired as a sportsman.

== Early life ==
Hardinge was born in 1886 at Greenwich in Kent. He was the son of William and Ellen Hardinge, his father being a seaman.

== Cricket career ==
In a first-class cricket career lasting 32 years from the age of 16, Hardinge scored 33,519 runs and made 75 centuries. He was coached by Captain William McCanlis at Kent's Tonbridge Nursery from the age of 13 and made his debut for the County in August 1902 against Lancashire at Tonbridge at the age of 16. He was the youngest player to make their first-class debut for Kent until 2006 and is still the second youngest debutant for the county. He became a regular in the team in 1907 when he was capped by the county. He played in the four Kent County Championship winning teams of the period between 1906 and 1913 and was named as one of Wisden's five Cricketers of the Year in 1915.

Hardinge was considered a "reliable opening batsman" who became "one of the mainstays of the Kent eleven" by 1911. He passed 1,000 runs for a season 18 times and scored more than 2,000 runs five times, his best season being 1928 when, at 42 years of age, he scored 2,446 runs at an average of just under 60 runs per innings. He scored centuries in four consecutive innings in 1913 and four times scored centuries in both innings of a match. In 1921, he became only the third cricketer, after C. B. Fry and Warwick Armstrong, to score a double-century and a century in the same match.

His one appearance in Test cricket came against Armstrong's touring Australian team in 1921 at Headingley in a match where Jack Hobbs had to withdraw on the opening day because of appendicitis. Hardinge scored 25 and 5 and was not picked again, although he did play twice in war-time matches for an England team against the Dominions in 1918. He was refused leave of absence to tour Australia in 1928–29 by his employer and had been unable to tour with England whilst he was playing professional football.

As of 2017 his runs total puts him 46th on the all-time list of runs scored in first-class cricket. He is Kent's second leading run scorer after his contemporary Frank Woolley and second, also to Woolley, in the county's all time appearances list with 606, including a run of 101 consecutive County Championship appearances between 1924 and 1928. His 1928 run aggregate is the third highest in Kent's history and his highest score of 263 not out remains the ninth highest in the county's first-class history.

In his early career Hardinge was considered a more promising bowler than batsman. He bowled slow left arm spinners well enough to take 371 career wickets in a Kent team which featured great spin bowlers such as Colin Blythe and Tich Freeman as well as Woolley and Bill Fairservice. He took six wickets for nine runs on a turning pitch at the Nevill Ground in Tunbridge Wells in 1929 and had a career best return of 7/64 against the Marylebone Cricket Club at Lord's in 1932. He was described by Wisden as one of the "finest outfields in the world".

As well as playing for Kent, Hardinge played in six Gentlemen v Players matches, scoring 127 at The Oval in 1921 for the Players. He made first-class appearances for a number of other teams, including the Royal Air Force, and made his final first-class appearance for Kent in 1933 aged 47.

== Football career ==
As a footballer, Hardinge played as an inside forward during the cricket off-season. He played for amateur clubs Eltham, Tonbridge and Maidstone United in Kent before signing for Newcastle United in 1905. After two and a half years there, mainly as a reserve, he moved to Sheffield United in 1907 for a fee of £350. There he flourished, playing 152 games in six seasons and scoring 46 goals, becoming one of the trickiest inside forwards in the game. Whilst at Bramall Lane he won one England cap in 1910 against Scotland at Hampden Park in the 1909–10 British Home Championship.

In the summer of 1913 Hardinge returned to the south, signing for Woolwich Arsenal (who had just moved into their new Highbury ground, and would drop the "Woolwich" from their name a year later), and played there either team of World War I. He made 70 wartime appearances for the team whilst serving as a mechanic during the war and played for an England team against Scotland in an RAF International match in 1919. He retired as a professional footballer in 1921, having played 55 times and scored 14 goals for the Gunners' first team.

== Military service ==
Hardinge served as a Special Constable and in the Royal Navy and Royal Air Force as a mechanic in World War I. He joined the Royal Naval Armoured Car Division in 1915 before transferring to the Royal Naval Air Service as an air mechanic at Crystal Palace and Blandford, being promoted to Chief Petty Officer in 1915. In 1918 the RNAS was merged with the Royal Flying Corps and Hardinge transferred again to the newly formed Royal Air Force with the rank of sergeant major, first with the Cadet Brigade headquarters at Hastings and then at the Armament School. He transferred to the RAF Reserve in January 1919 and was discharged in 1920.

== After retirement ==
Whilst playing cricket Hardinge worked for John Wisden & Co, although his employment with the company ended when he finished his cricketing career in 1934, and for the Cement Marketing Board. For a short time he coached Leicestershire. He was an FA instructor for Kent Secondary Schoolboys, leaving the post in 1935. He had a spell as a coach of Tottenham Hotspur's reserve team in the 1930s and for a short period became caretaker manager of the first team in 1935 after the departure of Percy Smith.

Hardinge died at Cambridge in 1965 at the age of 79 after a long illness.
