= 1906 English cricket season =

The 1906 English cricket season was the 17th since the beginning of the County Championship. The title was decided in the final round of matches with Kent County Cricket Club finishing just ahead of Yorkshire. George Hirst completed a unique "double Double" of 2,385 runs and 208 wickets. Tom Hayward broke Bobby Abel’s 1901 record for the most runs scored in a first-class season.

== County Championship ==
	County	Played	Won	Lost	Drawn	Points	Finished Games	%
1	Kent	22	16	2	4	14	18	77.77
2	Yorkshire	28	17	3	8	14	20	70.00
3	Surrey	28	18	4	6	14	22	63.63
4	Lancashire	26	15	6	5	9	21	42.85
5	Nottinghamshire	20	9	4	7	5	13	38.46
6	Warwickshire	20	7	4	9	3	11	27.27
7	Essex	22	9	6	7	3	15	23.00
8	Hampshire	20	7	9	4	-2	16	-12.50
9	Gloucestershire	20	6	10	4	-4	16	-25.00
10	Sussex	24	6	12	6	-6	18	-33.33
11	Somerset	18	4	10	4	-6	14	-42.85
11	Middlesex	18	4	10	4	-6	14	-42.85
11	Northamptonshire	16	4	10	2	-6	14	-42.85
14	Worcestershire	20	2	8	10	-6	10	-60.00
15	Leicestershire	22	3	14	5	-11	17	-64.70
16	Derbyshire	20	2	17	1	-15	19	-78.94

Points system:

- 1 for a win
- 0 for a draw, a tie or an abandoned match
- -1 for a loss

== Minor Counties Championship ==
	County	Played	Won	Won on 1st inns	No result	Possible points	Points obtained	%
1	Staffordshire	12	8	3	0	36	30	83.33
2	Devon	10	6	2	0	30	19	73.33
3	Bedfordshire	10	5	2	1	30	20	66.67
4	Berkshire	10	5	2	0	30	19	63.33
4	Surrey Second Eleven	10	5	2	0	30	19	63.33
6	Yorkshire Second Eleven	10	6	0	0	30	18	60.00
7	Hertfordshire	12	5	3	0	36	21	58.23
8	Durham	10	5	0	0	30	15	50.00
8	Glamorgan	12	6	0	0	36	18	50.00
8	Norfolk	8	4	0	0	24	8	50.00
11	Monmouthshire	10	2	4	0	30	14	46.66
12	Dorset	8	3	1	0	24	11	45.83
13	Wiltshire	10	4	0	0	30	12	40.00
14	Suffolk	8	2	1	0	24	8	33.33
15	Buckinghamshire	8	2	0	0	24	6	25.00
15	Cambridgeshire	8	2	0	0	24	6	25.00
17	Cornwall	8	1	0	0	24	3	12.50
17	Oxfordshire	8	1	0	0	24	3	12.50
19	Lancashire Second Eleven	8	0	1	0	24	2	8.33
20	Northumberland	8	0	0	1	24	1	4.16

Points system:

- 3 for an outright win
- 2 for a win on the first innings
- 1 for a match with no first innings decision
- 0 for a loss either outright or on the first innings of a drawn match

== Wisden Cricketers of the Year ==
- Jack Crawford, Arthur Fielder, Ernie Hayes, Kenneth Hutchings, Neville Knox

== Leading batsmen (qualification 20 innings) ==
1906 English season leading batsmen
Name	Team	Matches	Innings	Not outs	Runs	Highest score	Average	100s	50s
Cuthbert Burnup	Kent	13	21	3	1207	179	67.05	4	6
Tom Hayward	Surrey	36	61	8	3518	219	66.37	13	17
Kenneth Hutchings	Kent	21	34	4	1597	176	53.23	4	11
Ted Arnold	Worcestershire	21	39	4	1767	166	50.48	6	8
James Iremonger	Nottinghamshire	23	43	6	1794	200 not out	48.48	4	9
Percy Perrin	Essex	23	43	3	1893	150	47.32	5	11
Johnny Tyldesley	Lancashire	31	52	3	2270	295 not out	46.32	4	15
George Hirst	Yorkshire	35	58	6	2385	169	45.86	6	15
Ernie Hayes	Surrey	35	56	5	2309	218	45.27	7	11
Arthur Jones	Nottinghamshire	21	39	3	1560	105	43.33	1	14
William Burns	Worcestershire	18	32	4	1206	165	43.07	3	8

== Leading bowlers (qualification 1,000 balls) ==
1906 English season leading bowlers
Name	Team	Balls bowled	Runs conceded	Wickets taken	Average	Best bowling	5 wickets in innings	10 wickets in match
William Huddleston	Lancashire	1405	613	50	12.26	9/36	3	2
Willis Cuttell	Lancashire	2653	909	67	13.56	6/43	5	1
Schofield Haigh	Yorkshire	5810	2540	174	14.59	7/35	13	4
George Hirst	Yorkshire	7838	3434	208	16.50	7/18	19	4
Albert Hallam	Nottinghamshire	4994	1723	104	16.56	6/30	8	1
George Dennett	Gloucestershire; MCC	6875	3096	175	17.69	10/40	20	5
Billy Bestwick	Derbyshire	4657	2123	115	18.46	7/49	11	4
Thomas Wass	Nottinghamshire	3656	1888	100	18.88	8/25	9	4
Alfred Morcom	Cambridge University	1534	700	37	18.91	6/25	2	1
Frank Tarrant	Middlesex; MCC	3696	1740	91	19.12	9/54	7	1

== Notable events ==
- By winning their last eleven county matches, Kent won the Championship for the first time after Gloucestershire beat Yorkshire by a single run at Bristol in the final round of matches
- Kent's Arthur Fielder became the first bowler to take all ten wickets in an innings in the Gentlemen v Players match at Lord's
- Tom Hayward set numerous batting records:
1. The highest aggregate of runs in a first-class season – since beaten only by Compton and Bill Edrich in 1947.
2. The earliest to score 2,000 runs, on 5 July.
3. Two separate hundreds in consecutive matches against Nottinghamshire and Leicestershire.
- George Hirst became the only player to score 2,000 runs and take 200 wickets in a season. Against Somerset at Taunton, Hirst also became the only player to have two centuries and two five-wicket returns in one match.

== See also ==
- Kent County Cricket Club in 1906

== Annual reviews ==
- John Wisden’s Cricketers’ Almanack, 1907
