= Harold Hubble =

English cricketer

Harold John Hubble (3 October 1904 – 12 January 1989) was an English professional cricketer who played for Kent County Cricket Club between 1929 and 1931.

Hubble was born at Headcorn in Kent in 1904. He was the nephew of Jack Hubble who played for Kent as a batsman and wicket-keeper between 1904 and 1929 and followed his uncle on to the Kent playing staff in 1925. He played 44 times for the Kent Second XI between 1927 and 1931, making his first-class cricket debut for the county in August 1929 against Essex at Leyton.

He went on to make 13 appearances in first-class matches for Kent, leaving the staff in 1931 due to the lack of opportunities for First XI playing time at Kent who had a strong batting lineup at the time. He took up a position as cricket coach at Cranleigh School. Hubble later became the managing director of Hubble and Freeman, the sporting goods shop set up by his uncle and Kent bowler Tich Freeman.

During World War II, Hubble served with the Royal Air Force. He died at Tenterden in January 1989, aged 84.

== Bibliography ==
- Carlaw, Derek (2020). Kent County Cricketers, A to Z: Part Two (1919–1939) (PDF). Cardiff: ACS.
