= Kent vs Lancashire at Canterbury =

Painting by Albert Chevallier Tayler

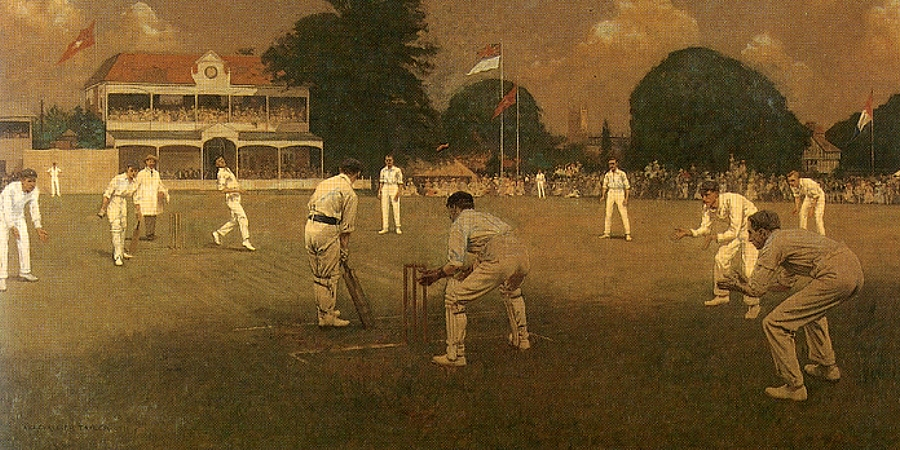
- Kent vs Lancashire at Canterbury, 1906
- Artist: Albert Chevallier Tayler
- Year: 1907
- Medium: oil on canvas
- Subject: A cricket match between Kent and Lancashire at the St Lawrence Ground
- Dimensions: 114 cm × 228.5 cm (45 in × 90 in)
- Location: Lord's Pavilion, Lord's Cricket Ground; London
- Owner: Andrew Brownsword Art Foundation

Kent vs Lancashire at Canterbury is an oil on canvas painting by Albert Chevallier Tayler completed in 1907. It was commissioned by the Kent County Cricket Club at the suggestion of chairman Lord Harris to celebrate their first County Championship title win. Tayler painted the picture after taking individual sittings with each of the Kent players. With the exception of short-term loans, the painting remained at the St Lawrence Ground until 1999, at which time it was moved to the Lord's Pavilion as Kent could no longer afford the insurance. In 2006, Kent sold the painting to a charity foundation at an auction. The piece is currently on display at Lord's Cricket Ground in London.

== Commissioning ==
Kent County Cricket Club won the 1906 County Championship, gaining 78% of the points available in their completed matches, above the 70% achieved by second-place Yorkshire County Cricket Club. This was Kent's first victory since the County Championship had been instituted in 1890. At a celebratory dinner in London, the Kent chairman, George Harris, 4th Baron Harris, suggested that the club commission a painting to celebrate the championship victory.

Kent selected Albert Chevallier Tayler as the artist; he had earlier painted Lord Harris batting for Kent in 1905. Tayler was paid 200 guineas by Kent for the painting, with an additional royalty for reproductions that could bring the total as high as 350 guineas.

== Composition ==
Lord Harris expressed his view that the painting should show an action shot of a match at the St Lawrence Ground, Canterbury, and suggested that the bowler in the painting should be Kent's Colin Blythe. Kent had only played three matches at Canterbury during the 1906 season; of those it was decided that the subject of the painting would be Kent's match against Lancashire County Cricket Club. That match was part of the Canterbury Cricket Week, and Blythe had taken eight wickets, making it the most appropriate of the three fixtures to depict. Tayler decided that he would show the second day of the match, at an hour prior to lunchtime.

The painting shows the view from the boundary of the Nackington Road end of the St. Lawrence Ground with Canterbury Cathedral visible in the background. The painting has Blythe in the action of bowling from the Pavilion End to Johnny Tyldesley. Tayler compressed the view of the playing area so that he could feature all of Kent's eleven players while keeping them recognisable and reasonably sized.

To ensure accuracy, Tayler arranged sittings with each member of the Kent team and made an effort to paint each one true to life. He initially planned to include non-striking Lancashire batsman Harry Makepeace, but when Makepeace was unable to attend a sitting, Tayler used another Lancashire player, William Findlay, as the batsman. Findlay had not actually played in that particular match, but he was available to visit Tayler's London studio as he had been newly appointed secretary of the Surrey County Cricket Club after his retirement from active cricket competition at the end of 1906.

== Reception and display history ==
Tayler completed the painting in 1907. By this time, 192 advance engravings of the painting had been ordered, ensuring that Tayler would be well compensated for the work. When the painting was unveiled, it was praised for its accuracy, use of lighting, and shade. In 1908, a limited print signed by Tayler and Lord Harris was created; further prints were made by Kent in 1990 and 2000, and each was signed by current players of their respective times, including Colin Cowdrey, Les Ames and Matthew Fleming, as well as the cricket writer E.W. Swanton. As a result of its popularity, the painting was lent out for display at Rectory Field, Blackheath and Lord's Cricket Ground. The painting is viewed by cricket fans and historians as a notable illustration of the Golden Age of cricket in the Victorian and Edwardian periods before the First World War. Cricket historian E. W. Swanton praised the painting, singling it out as "one of the finest ever portrayals of distinguished identifiable cricketers in action".

The painting was predominantly displayed in the pavilion of the St. Lawrence Ground. However, in 1999 it was lent to Marylebone Cricket Club (MCC) after Kent were unable to continue to afford its insurance. The MCC hung the painting in the Lord's Pavilion while Kent retained one of the prints for display in the St. Lawrence Ground pavilion in place of the original. In 2005, with Kent finding itself in debt, the club announced their intention to sell the painting. When questioned by Kent members about the proposed sale, Kent chairman Carl Openshaw said that it was being done because he felt the painting no longer particularly benefited the cricket club as many of Kent's members already owned reproductions of the painting. Openshaw also stated that the painting would not be sold if it did not achieve an "appropriate sum".

The painting was auctioned at Sotheby's in 2006. With a guide price of £300,000 to £500,000, the painting was sold for £680,000. This was a record price for a cricket painting. It was bought by the Andrew Brownsword Art Foundation run by Bath Rugby chairman Andrew Brownsword; the foundation is known for keeping "important British paintings in the public eye in Britain". The painting's new owner lent it to the MCC so it could be kept on display at Lord's in keeping with Openshaw's preference that the painting remain at Lord's. The sale of the painting contributed to a £293,000 profit for Kent in their 2006 financial year. On display in the Long Room in the Lord's Pavilion, the painting has been used as the background for a number of publicity photographs for the England cricket team, including the unveiling of new England captains.
