= George McCanlis =

English cricketer and soldier

Personal information
- Full name: George McCanlis
- Born: 3 December 1846; Landguard Fort, Suffolk
- Died: 8 October 1937 (aged 90); Upper Norwood, London
- Batting: Right-handed
- Bowling: Right-arm medium
- Relatives: William McCanlis (brother)

Domestic team information
- Years: Team
- 1869–1875: Royal Artillery
- 1873–1878: Kent
- FC debut: 18 August 1873 Kent v Surrey
- Last FC: 29 July 1878 Kent v Surrey

Career statistics
Competition	First-class
Matches	17
Runs scored	364
Batting average	12.55
100s/50s	0/1
Top score	60
Balls bowled	300
Wickets	3
Bowling average	39.00
5 wickets in innings	0
10 wickets in match	0
Best bowling	1/9
Catches/stumpings	8/–
- Source: CricInfo, 19 December 2018

George McCanlis (3 December 1847 – 18 October 1937) was an English soldier and cricketer who played first-class cricket for Kent between 1873 and 1878. He was born at the garrison of Landguard Fort in Suffolk where his father was serving in the British Army.

Like his brother William, who also played for Kent and later became influential in the development of young cricketers through the Tonbridge Nursery, George McCanlis was a right-handed batsman sometimes used as an opener and an occasional right-arm bowler. He played in 17 first-class matches for Kent, heading the county's batting averages in 1873. His best innings came on his debut, a score of 60 when he and his brother made 99 of the 107 runs that came from the bat in Kent's first innings against Surrey at The Oval. In the same match he took a wicket with his first ball in first-class cricket. He is one of only three Kent players to have done so and the first to achieve the feat.

McCanlis served in the Royal Artillery (RA), probably reaching the rank of Bombardier. His father had served in the RA and his brother also did so. He played cricket for the Royal Artillery Cricket Club (RACC), including in matches against the Royal Engineers. The RACC was largely an officers club at the time, although enlisted me such as the McCanlis brothers were allowed to play if they were considered good enough. Along with his brother and Victor Barton he is one of only three enlisted gunners to have played first-class cricket whilst serving in the RA.

McCanlis died at Upper Norwood in London in October 1873 aged 89.

== Bibliography ==
- Carlaw, Derek (2020). Kent County Cricketers, A to Z: Part One (1806–1914) (PDF). Cardiff: ACS.
