= Cuthbert Burnup =

English sportsman (1875–1960)

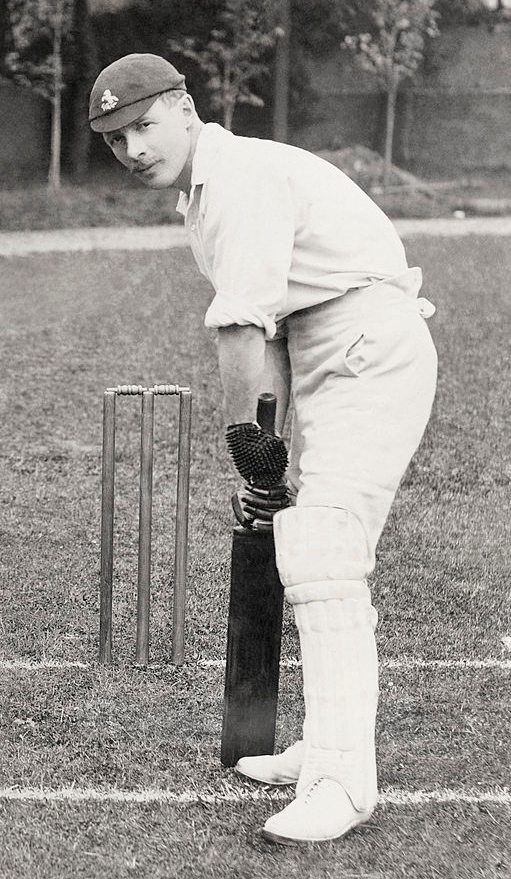
- Burnup in about 1905

Personal information
- Full name: Cuthbert James Burnup
- Born: 21 November 1875; Blackheath, Kent
- Died: 5 April 1960 (aged 84); Golders Green, Middlesex
- Nickname: Pinky
- Batting: Right-handed

Domestic team information
- Years: Team
- 1895–1898: Cambridge University
- 1896–1907: Kent
- 1899–1903: Marylebone Cricket Club
- 1901: London County

Career statistics
Competition	First-class
Matches	228
Runs scored	13,614
Batting average	36.79
100s/50s	26/81
Top score	200
Balls bowled	5,813
Wickets	98
Bowling average	32.42
5 wickets in innings	4
10 wickets in match	0
Best bowling	6/36
Catches/stumpings	107/–
- Source: CricInfo, 5 March 2016

Cuthbert James "Pinky" Burnup (21 November 1875 – 5 April 1960) was an English amateur sportsman who played cricket and football around the turn of the 20th century. Burnup played once for the England football team but is more renowned for playing over 200 first-class cricket matches, mainly for Kent County Cricket Club. He was named as one of Wisden's Cricketers of the Year in 1903.

== Early life and education ==
Burnup was born in Blackheath, then part of the county of Kent, the son of J. M. Burnup. He was educated at Malvern School, where he captained the school cricket and racquets teams, and, from 1894, Clare College, Cambridge, gaining Blues in football and cricket. Burnup played for Cambridge University Cricket Club for three years from 1896, leading the university in runs scored in both 1896 and 1898, and the University football team from 1895 to 1898.

== Football career ==
Burnup played 79 matches for Corinthian F.C. between 1894 and 1901, scoring 28 times. He played on the left wing and was considered a quick player who could dribble the ball effectively. He toured with Corinthian to South Africa in 1897 and helped the club win the London Charity Cup in the same year. He also played for Old Malvernians F.C.

Whilst at Cambridge, Burnup was selected to represent England against Scotland at Celtic Park in Glasgow in April 1896. The match, part of the 1896–97 British Home Championship, ended with England losing 2–1, the first Scottish victory in the fixture for 20 years. The match did much to signal the end of the reliance of the Football Association on amateur footballers. It was his only game for England.

== Cricket career ==
Burnup made his first-class cricket debut in 1895 for the Gentlemen of England at Lord's against I Zingari. He made his Kent County Cricket Club debut in 1896 whilst at university and played regularly for the county until 1907. He scored over 1,000 runs in a season for Kent eight times and made 157 first-class appearances for the team. In 1896 he became the first Kent batsman to score a century before lunch in Kent, making his century against Gloucestershire at Gravesend.

As an opening batsman Burnup was considered cautious but was able to score on all types of pitch and could, when required, score quickly. He scored Kent's first double hundred, making exactly 200 against Lancashire in 1900, and scored over 2,000 runs in 1902. In 1903 Wisden named him as one of the five Cricketers of the Year. He made 102 consecutive County Championship appearances for Kent between 1899 and 1903, becoming the first man to play in over 100 consecutive Championship matches for the county. He captained Kent for one season in 1903, taking over from Jack Mason who had resigned as captain at the end of the previous season.

Burnup played an important role in Kent's first County Championship winning campaign in 1906, leading the domestic first-class batting averages, scoring 1,207 runs at 67.05 despite playing in only 13 matches during the season. He was described by The Guardian as "essentially a sound, steady batsman" who contrasted with the flamboyant Kenneth Hutchings, Kent's leading run scorer of the season. He took part in tours to Holland, America and Australia and New Zealand during his career.

Burnup appears in the record books as the only first-class bowler to have 10 runs scored off one ball. This happened when he was playing for MCC against Derbyshire in 1900 during a short-lived trial system where a net was placed around the playing surface. The runs were scored by Samuel Hill Wood.

== Later life ==
Burnup was a stockbroker and businessman in London. He died at North End, Golders Green, Middlesex at the age of 84 in 1960.

Sporting positions
Preceded by Jack Mason	Kent County Cricket Club captain 1903	Succeeded by C. H. B. Marsham
