= John Seymour (cricketer) =

English cricketer

John Seymour was an English cricketer active from 1904 to 1931 who played for Northamptonshire (Northants) and Sussex. He was born in Brightling, Sussex on 24 August 1881 and died in Daventry on 1 December 1967. He appeared in 136 first-class matches as a righthanded batsman who bowled left-arm orthodox spin. He scored 3,430 runs with a highest score of 136 not out, his only century, and took 113 wickets with a best performance of six for 58.
