= Tom Pawley =

English cricketer

Tom Edward Pawley (21 January 1859 – 3 August 1923) was an English first-class cricketer who played four games for Kent between 1880 and 1887 with limited success. He was much more notable for his role as the manager of Kent County Cricket Club. He was born at Farningham, educated at Tonbridge School and died at Canterbury. At the time of his death he was the manager of the Kent team, a role he had undertaken since 1887. Arriving in the city with his wife on the day before the first game of Canterbury Festival week he was taken ill on entering a cab and died before he reached hospital. Kent donated a sum of 500 pounds to his widow.

As Kent manager he was responsible for organising the cricket weeks and was credited with increasing the county's membership putting the club on a firm financial footing. He created the Tonbridge Nursery and was responsible for improving the facilities at the St Lawrence Ground in Canterbury. He was also the manager of the MCC team to Australia in 1911–12 when England beat Australia 4–1 in the Ashes. Pelham Warner wrote of him ‘a man of boundless energy – a born organiser and straight as a die’.

He was the son of Thomas John Pawley, a publican, and Caroline Pawley (née Cutbush). He married Alice Margaret Harris in 1886; the couple had three children.

== Bibliography ==
- Carlaw, Derek (2020). Kent County Cricketers, A to Z: Part One (1806–1914) (PDF). Cardiff: ACS.
