= Bill Fairservice =

English cricketer

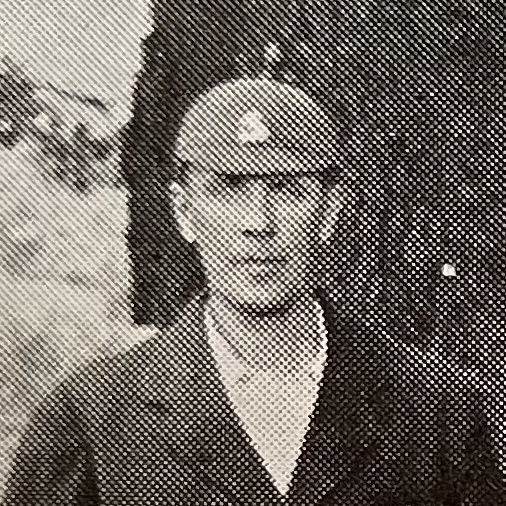

Personal information
- Full name: William John Fairservice
- Born: 16 May 1881; Nunhead, Surrey
- Died: 26 June 1971 (aged 90); Canterbury, Kent
- Batting: Right-handed
- Bowling: Right-arm offbreak
- Relatives: Colin Fairservice (son)

Domestic team information
- Years: Team
- 1902–1921: Kent
- FC debut: 29 May 1902 Kent v MCC
- Last FC: 24 August 1921 Kent v Middlesex

Career statistics
Competition	First-class
Matches	302
Runs scored	4,939
Batting average	15.29
100s/50s	0/9
Top score	61*
Balls bowled	44,889
Wickets	859
Bowling average	22.60
5 wickets in innings	39
10 wickets in match	7
Best bowling	7/44
Catches/stumpings	164/–
- Source: Cricinfo, 24 February 2016

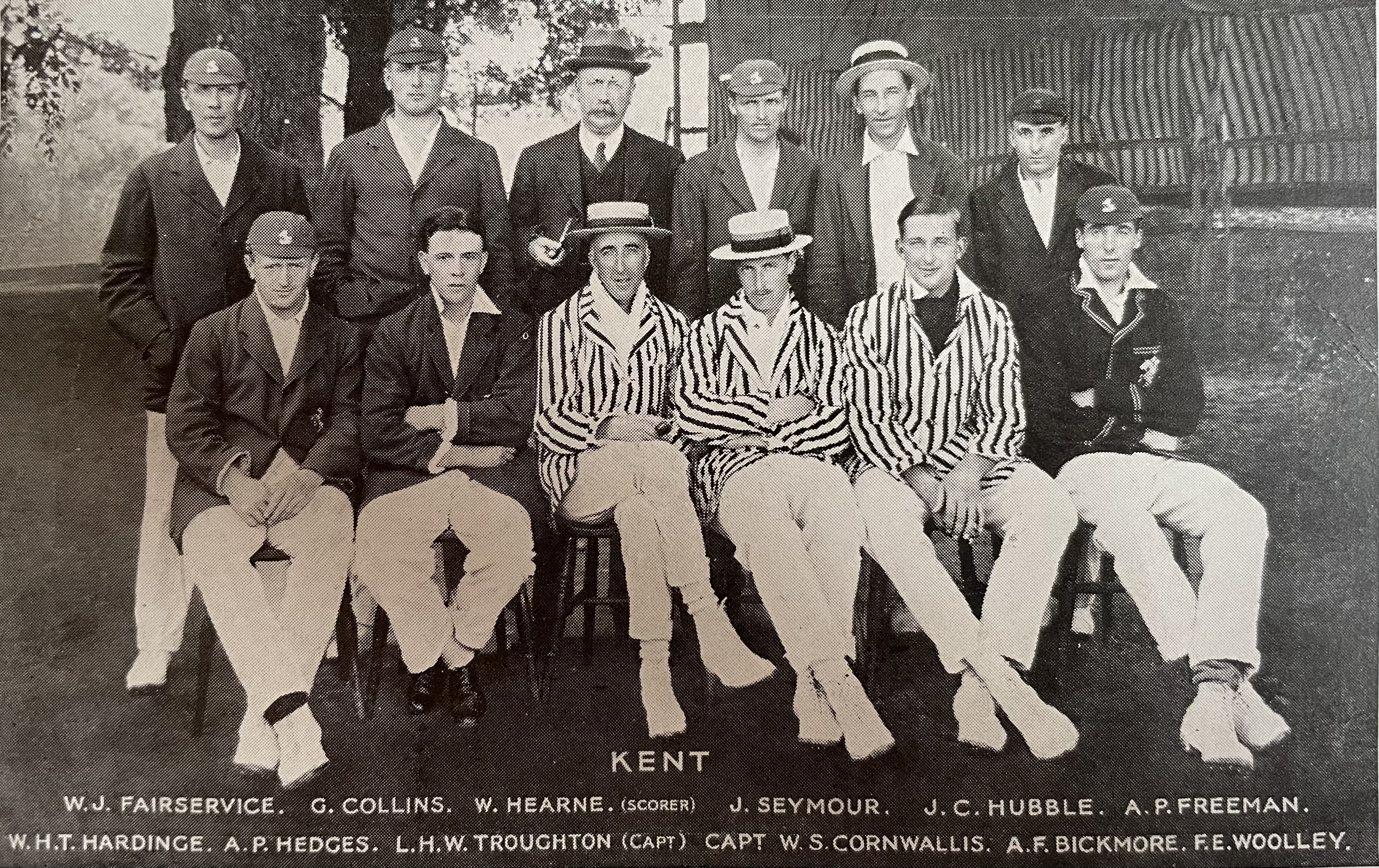
Fairservice in the Kent team of about 1922

William John Fairservice (16 May 1881 – 26 June 1971) was an English professional cricketer who played first-class cricket for Kent County Cricket Club between 1902 and 1921. He was a right-arm medium-pace off-break bowler who batted in the lower order and played over 300 first-class matches in his career. After his cricketing career he coached cricket and was a scorer. His son, Colin Fairservice, played for Kent and Middlesex from 1929 to 1936.

== Early life ==
Fairservice was born at Nunhead in what was then part of Surrey in 1881. He was the son of toy maker William Fairservice and his wife Lucia, whose family had moved to Tonbridge in Kent by 1902. After leaving school Fairservice worked as a toy store keeper, probably alongside his father.

== Cricket career ==
After an initial trial in 1899, Fairservice was employed at Kent's Tonbridge Nursery in 1902. He first played for Kent's Second XI in 1901 and made his first-class cricket debut for the county in May 1902 against MCC at Lord's. He played in two matches in 1902, taking five wickets.

Fairservice is often credited with taking the wicket of W.G. Grace as his first wicket in first-class cricket. Fairservice did bowl Grace twice in the same match in May 1903, again against MCC at Lord's, but his first wickets were taken in the same fixture the previous year in which Grace did not play.

Fairservice played fairly regularly from 1903 until the start of World War I during a period in which Kent won four County Championship titles. He took at least 35 wickets in every season other than 1912, although his opportunities were limited as Kent had spin bowlers Colin Blythe and Frank Woolley as regulars in the team at this time. He was awarded his county cap in 1903.

With Blythe killed in the war, Fairservice had increased opportunities in 1919 and 1920. In the latter, a cool summer with many wet pitches, Fairservice had his most productive season, taking 113 wickets at an average of 17.46, although Wisden admitted that batsmen still did not find him difficult when pitches were firm. A highlight of that season was when he and Woolley bowled out Surrey for 61 and 73 on a slow, sticky wicket at Blackheath. In the exceptionally hot and dry summer of 1921, however, Fairservice was less effective, taking only 50 wickets at an average of 32.50, and announced his retirement at the close of 1921 after being awarded a benefit match against Surrey, although he played for Northumberland between 1924 and 1926.

== War service ==
During World War I Fairservice served with the Kent Fortress Royal Engineers (KFE). He is believed to have been stationed in the UK throughout the war and appeared for KFE cricket teams alongside fellow Kent professionals Colin Blythe, David Jennings and Claud Woolley in 1916. By 1918 he was serving with the Royal Military Police although none of his service papers survive.

== Later life ==
After retiring from professional cricket, Fairservice coached cricket at Tonbridge School, Malvern College and Lancing College. He was an umpire and for four years the groundsman at Sevenoaks Vine and later acted as the scorer for Kent's Second XI until he was 87. His son, Colin Fairservice, played first-class cricket for Kent and Middlesex before coaching at The King's School, Canterbury where Fairservice would bowl in the nets until he was in his eighties. He died in Canterbury in 1971 aged 90.
