= Albert Chevallier Tayler =

English painter

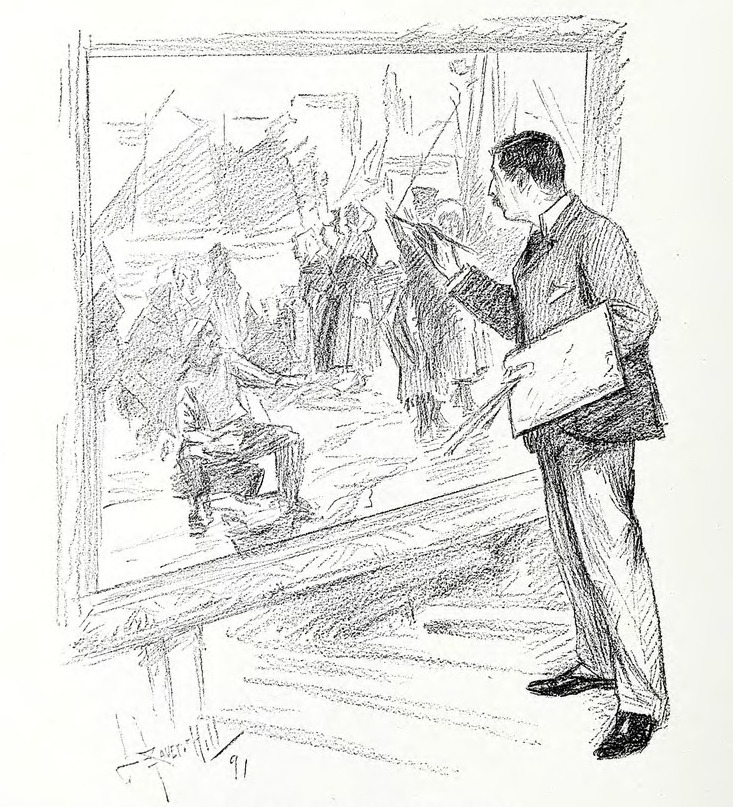
- Chevallier Tayler painting ‘ La Vie Boulonuaise.'
- Born: 5 April 1862; Leytonstone
- Died: 20 December 1925; London
- Education: Bloxham School, Slade School of Fine Art
- Occupation: Painter

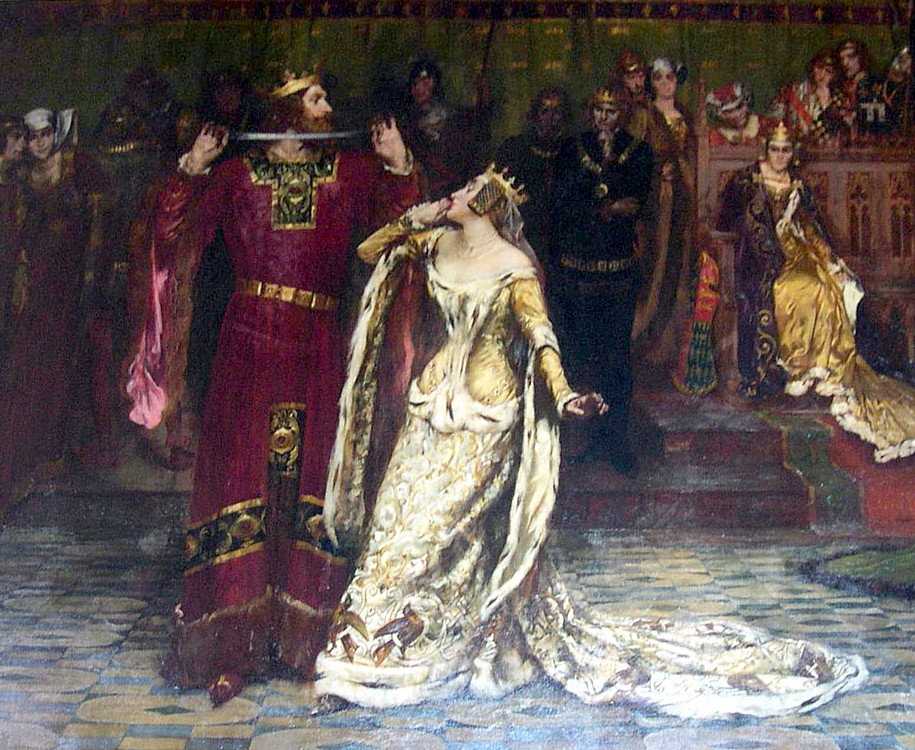
Ceremony of the Garter painted 1901. Source: Collection of C.Michael Hogan

Albert Chevallier Tayler (5 April 1862 – 20 December 1925) was an English artist who specialised in portrait and genre painting, but he was also involved in the plein air methods of the Newlyn School. He studied at Heatherley's School of Art, Royal Academy Schools and with avant-garde painters in Paris. He was educated at Bloxham School in Oxfordshire.

== Early years with the Newlyn School ==
He is most known for his twelve-year involvement with the Newlyn School of painting. The Newlyn School was spawned after many international artists followed the En plein air school in France, whereby artists would leave Paris and take up rural life in small colonies of kindred painters. Thence, as artists returned from France to their own countries, they sought out remote locations to congregate and pursue the En plein air method. The Newlyn School is also known as British Impressionism.

A typical painting of this early period is A Dress Rehearsal (1888), hung in the National Museums Liverpool. This painting makes use of light and shadow and is based upon a genre scene as might have occurred in Cornwall. The Newlyn School drew their subjects from everyday life in the local area. Other associate artists of the Newlyn School were Henry Scott Tuke, Thomas Cooper Gotch, Caroline Gotch, Stanhope Forbes, Leghe Suthers, Walter Langley and Elizabeth Armstrong. On arrival in Newlyn, he lived in lodgings in Henry & Elizabeth Maddern's Belle Vue House with Forbes and Blandford Fletcher.

== The London era ==
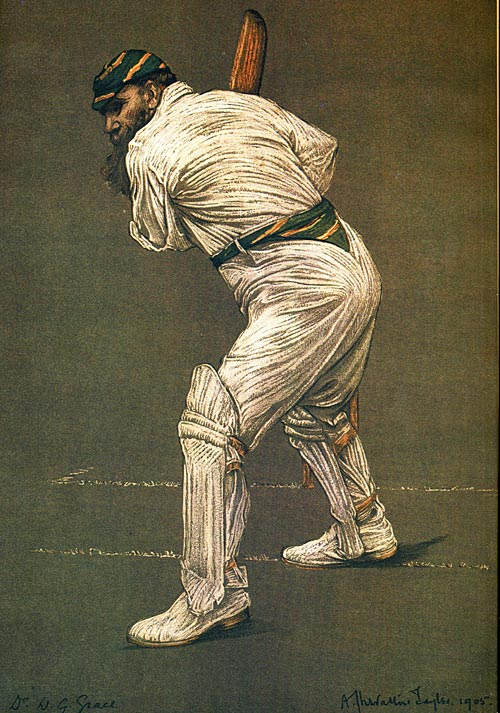
Portrait of WG Grace, painted 1905

During the 1890s he maintained connections with the art centre of London and exhibited regularly at the Royal Academy; however, at about the turn of the century he moved to London and converted to a more genteel, urban lifestyle. Tayler began painting more grand scenes of the cities of Europe. In 1901 he painted one of his largest and most masterful works, The Ceremony of the Garter, depicting the famous late Middle Ages scene at Eltham Palace in which the fallen garter of Joan of Kent is picked up by King Edward III. This event circa 1348 led to Edward III founding the Order of the Garter.

By 1903 Tayler was renowned and was commissioned to paint a large panel at the Royal Exchange in London; the resultant painting of The Five Kings depicts Kings Edward III of England, David of Scotland, Peter I of Cyprus, John of France and Waldemar IV of Denmark partaking in a feast hosted by the Master of the Society of Vintners in London in 1363.

Tayler was an avid cricketer, and in 1905 produced a set of twelve watercolours of famous and mostly royal cricket players. Lord Leverhulme used the series to produce lithographs and advertise his Lever Brothers soap products. The promotion proved popular, and the National Portrait Gallery, London has nine of these images hanging. In 1906 he painted a famous picture of a cricket match in progress, Kent vs Lancashire at Canterbury, which was commissioned by Kent. In June 2006, the county sold the painting at auction for £680,000, a record price for a cricket painting.

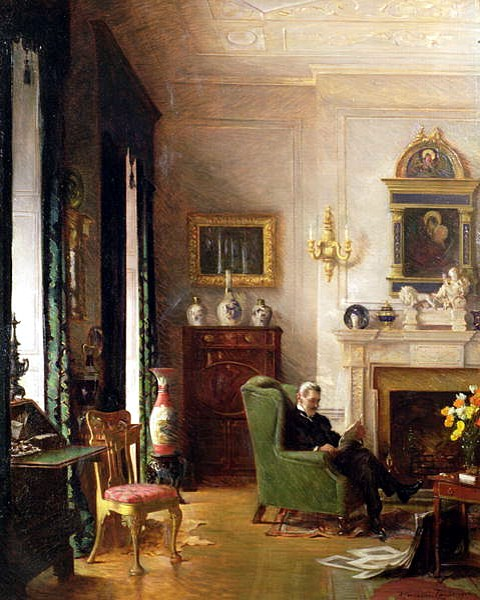
The Grey Drawing Room

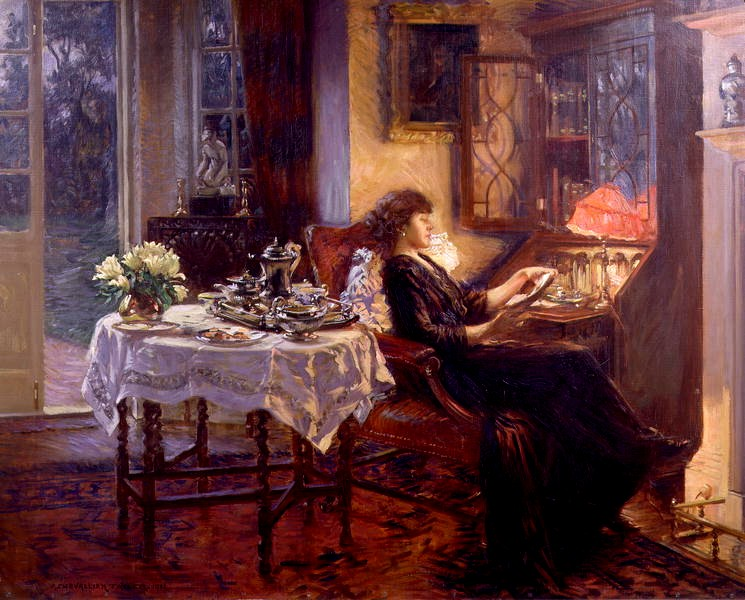
The Quiet Hour

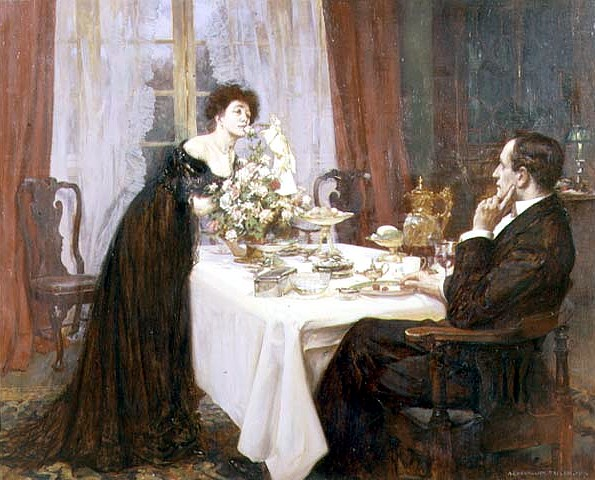
Elizabeth Barrett Browning by Albert Chevallier Tayler 1909

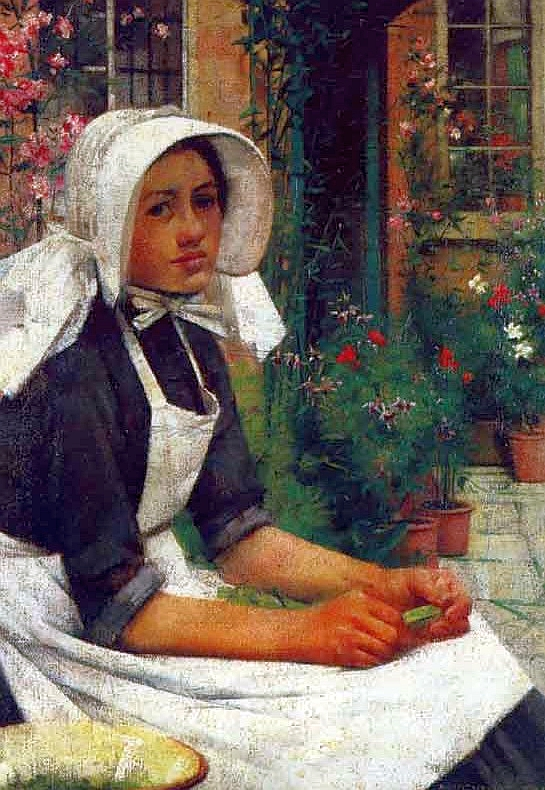
Girl Shelling Peas

== Bibliography ==
- Cooper, John, A Visitor's Guide to the National Portrait Gallery, London, ISBN 1-85514-298-8
- English Literary Magazine, Volume XXXV (1906)
- Royal Academy, London
- Strandberg Art Gallery
