= William McCanlis =

English cricketer

Personal information
- Full name: William McCanlis
- Born: 30 October 1840; Woolwich, Kent
- Died: 19 November 1925 (aged 85); Westcombe Park, London
- Batting: Right-handed

Domestic team information
- Years: Team
- 1862–1877: Kent

Career statistics
Competition	First-class
Matches	45
Runs scored	1,113
Batting average	13.57
100s/50s	0/3
Top score	67
Balls bowled	875
Wickets	18
Bowling average	27.55
5 wickets in innings	0
10 wickets in match	0
Best bowling	4/67
Catches/stumpings	19/–
- Source: ESPNcricinfo, 19 June 2016

Captain William McCanlis (30 October 1840 – 19 November 1925) was an English cricketer who played first-class cricket for Kent County Cricket Club between 1862 and 1877 and later became known for his role in coaching young cricketers at the county's Tonbridge Nursery. He was born at Woolwich, then considered to be part of Kent but now in London, and died at Westcombe Park in Blackheath.

== Playing career ==
McCanlis had a long career in the British Army as a quartermaster in the Ordnance Store Department, a forerunner of the Royal Army Ordnance Corps; he was awarded the honorary rank of captain in 1886 and was regularly referred to as "Captain McCanlis" thereafter. He played cricket for Kent as a right-handed middle-order or opening batsman and an occasional bowler in a few matches in the early 1860s, and then returned to play fairly regularly between 1871 and 1877. By modern standards, his batting figures are unimpressive, and his highest score was an innings of 67 made against Lancashire in 1873. In the same season, he and his brother George scored 99 of the 107 runs that came from the bat in Kent's first innings in the Surrey game. An obituary of him almost 50 years after his last first-class game stated: "At his best, he was a powerful hitter, driving extremely well, and he was also a useful field."

== Coaching career ==
After he ceased playing, McCanlis joined the Kent County Cricket Club committee and took charge of the identification and development of young players at the newly established Tonbridge Nursery. He was credited with spotting and then coaching many of the players who provided Kent with its most successful team ever in the years leading up to the First World War, among them Colin Blythe, Frank Woolley, James Seymour, Arthur Fielder, Jack Hubble and Wally Hardinge.

== Family ==
McCanlis' brother George played first-class cricket for Kent alongside him; his grandson Kenneth McCanlis was a Minor Counties player and a first-class umpire; Maurice McCanlis, Oxford University cricket captain and an England rugby union international, was a cousin.

== Bibliography ==
- Carlaw, Derek (2020). Kent County Cricketers, A to Z: Part One (1806–1914) (PDF). Cardiff: ACS.
