= Arthur Fielder =

English cricketer (1877–1949)

- Fielder in 1906

Personal information
- Full name: Arthur Fielder
- Born: 19 July 1877; Plaxtol, Tonbridge, Kent
- Died: 30 August 1949 (aged 72); Lambeth, London
- Nickname: Pip
- Batting: Right-handed
- Bowling: Right-arm fast

International information
- National side: England
- Test debut (cap 140): 1 January 1904 v Australia
- Last Test: 11 February 1908 v Australia

Domestic team information
- Years: Team
- 1900–1914: Kent

Career statistics
Competition	Tests	First-class
Matches	6	287
Runs scored	78	2,320
Batting average	11.14	11.31
100s/50s	0/0	1/2
Top score	20	112*
Balls bowled	1,491	52,086
Wickets	26	1,277
Bowling average	27.34	21.02
5 wickets in innings	1	97
10 wickets in match	0	28
Best bowling	6/82	10/90
Catches/stumpings	4/–	119/–
- Source: CricInfo, 26 December 2008

Arthur Fielder (19 July 1877 – 30 August 1949) was an English cricketer who played as a fast bowler for Kent County Cricket Club and the England cricket team from 1900 to 1914. He played a major role in Kent's four County Championship wins in the years before World War I and toured Australia twice with the England team, making six Test match appearances. He was chosen as one of Wisden's Cricketers of the Year in 1907.

== Early life ==
Fielder was born at Plaxtol, on 19 July 1877. He grew up the son of a farm bailiff and worked on a hop farm in his early years. In 1897, he joined Kent's newly established Tonbridge nursery at the Angel Ground under Captain William McCanlis. This was a successful player development programme which allowed young professional cricketers to be trained and developed the nucleus of the Kent teams of the early 20th century. Fielder also spent a year on the ground staff at the Marylebone Cricket Club (MCC) in 1904.

== Cricket career ==
Fielder made his first-class cricket debut in 1900, playing for Kent against Essex at the County Ground, Leyton. He went wicketless and was out without scoring in the match. He went on to play 249 first-class matches, taking 1,277 wickets at an average of 21.02 and featured in four County Championship winning teams for his County.

Fielder broke into the Kent team properly in 1903, replacing fast bowler Bill Bradley in the First XI and showing what Wisden called "capital form". After this successful season Fielder was selected for the England cricket team for the tour of Australia in 1903–04. Fielder did not enjoy a particularly successful tour, although he played in two of the Test matches, making his Test debut on 1 January 1904 in the second test at the MCG.

After a poor 1905 season, Fielder was the leading wicket taker for the Kent team which won the 1906 County Championship, appearing in all 22 Championship matches and taking 158 wickets for the County in the process. He was named one of Wisden's Cricketers of the Year in 1907, alongside his County colleague Kenneth Hutchings. During the season he became the first man to take all 10 wickets in an innings in the Gentlemen v Players match at Lord's, taking 10/90 in the first innings and 14 wickets overall in the match. Fielder took six wickets or more on 13 occasions during the 1906 season and 172 in total for the county. He is one of only four men to take more than 150 wickets in a season for Kent, a feat he repeated in 1907 when he enjoyed another good season, again taking 172 wickets in total for Kent at an average of 16.

Fielder was selected to tour Australia again in 1907–08 with England. He played in the first four Tests on the tour, taking 25 wickets at 25.08, England's second leading Test wicket taker on the tour. He took 6/82 in a narrow defeat at Sydney in the first Test and scored 18 runs in a crucial last wicket partnership in the final innings of the second Test at Melbourne as England won by one wicket.

Whilst strictly a tail-end batsman, he scored an undefeated 112, his only first-class century, against Worcestershire at Amblecote batting at number 11 and shared a partnership of 235 for the tenth wicket with Frank Woolley who scored 185. This is still the highest last-wicket partnership in the County Championship. The pair came together when Kent were still 40 behind Worcestershire's first innings of 360 and raised Kent's total to 555. Kent went on to win by an innings. Woolley had retired hurt earlier in the innings after being hit in the mouth by a ball from Ted Arnold.

Fielder remained a major part of the Kent team until 1914, taking over 100 wickets in 1909, 1911 and 1913. He was part of the Kent Championship winning teams of 1909, 1910 and 1913. World War I ended Fielder's first-class career although he did play two non-first-class matches for the MCC after the war.

== Style of play ==
Fielder was described by Wisden in 1907 as being "quite modern in his methods, keeping the ball for the most part well outside the off-stump". He generally bowled out-swing deliveries, swerving the ball away from the batsman and relying on catches by slip fielders. He also used deliveries which made the ball break back into the batsman and is described, again by Wisden in 1907, as bowling at a "fine pace". He bowled consistently and could be relied upon to bowl long spells.

He had an unusual run-up. A contemporary account described it: "Fielder ... has three distinct paces when running to the wicket, and at each change he bobs his head as if to avoid something hurled at him."

== Personal life and death ==
In 1909, Fielder married Annie Mitchell in Tonbridge, and they had one son. Fielder was too old to serve in the military during World War I, so he joined the Kent Constabulary as a auxiliary policeman. He died at St Thomas' Hospital in London on 30 August 1949, aged 72.

== Bibliography ==
- Birley, Derek (1999). A Social History of English Cricket. London: Aurum Press. ISBN 978-18-54107-10-7 – via Internet Archive.
- Carlaw, Derek (2020). Kent County Cricketers, A to Z: Part One (1806–1914) (PDF). Cardiff: ACS.
- Lewis, Paul (2014). For Kent and Country. Eastbourne: Reveille Press. ISBN 978-19-08336-63-7.
