= Angel Ground =

Sports ground in Kent, England

- Interactive map of Angel Ground
- Location: Tonbridge, Kent
- Coordinates: 51.1925°N 0.2745°E
- Owner: Tonbridge Cricket Club (1905–1945); Tonbridge Urban District Council (1947–1980)
- Type: Sports ground
- Surface: Grass
- Record attendance: 8,236 (Tonbridge Angels F.C. vs Aldershot F.C., 1951–52)

Construction
- Opened: 1868 (first known use)
- Closed: 1980
- Demolished: 1980

Tenants
- Kent County Cricket Club (1869–1939); Tonbridge Angels F.C. (1948–1980)

The Angel Ground was a sports ground located in Tonbridge in the English county of Kent. It was used as a venue for first-class cricket by Kent County Cricket Club between 1869 and 1939 and then for association football by Tonbridge Angels F.C. until 1980. It was controversially demolished and redeveloped by Tonbridge and Malling District Council in 1980.

The ground was located in the centre of Tonbridge, around 250 metres (820 ft) north-east of Tonbridge Railway Station, just to the east of Tonbridge High Street. It was bordered on the north by a branch of the River Medway and suffered from flooding in 1925.

== Cricket venue ==
The ground was named after the nearby Angel Hotel and was initially used as a cricket ground. Although a field near the Angel Inn is first referenced as a cricket ground in 1844, the first recorded match, featuring Tonbridge Cricket Club, was in 1868. The club purchased the ground in 1905 for £4,300 and used it until 1942.

The ground was first used as a venue for first-class cricket in 1869 when Kent played Nottinghamshire. The ground became more widely used by the county during the 1880s, with Sussex initially being the most frequent visitors. A cricket week was first held in 1890 and had become the second oldest (after the Canterbury Cricket Week) of Kent's five established cricket weeks by the time of the First World War. The week was the county's first of the season and was described by The Times in 1911 as "one of the most delightful". There were usually at least two County Championship matches held on the ground each year.

Kent played 106 First XI matches on the ground, with the county Second XI also using the ground many times, including in the Minor Counties Championship. The final first-class match to be played on the ground was in June 1939 when Kent drew with Glamorgan.

=== Records on the ground ===
A total of 106 first-class matches were held on the ground, all of them featuring Kent as the home team.

- Highest total: 621/6 declared by Kent against Essex, 1922
- Lowest total: 16 by Warwickshire against Kent, 1913
- Highest partnership: 307, 2nd wicket by John Langridge and HW Parks, for Sussex against Kent, 1939
- Highest individual score: 240, EH Hendren, for Middlesex against Kent, 1925
- Best bowling in an innings: 10/48, CHG Bland, for Sussex against Kent, 1899
- Best bowling in a match: 15/76, C Blythe, for Kent against Hampshire, 1904

The total made against Essex in 1922 was Kent's highest total in first-class cricket when it was set. As of December 2017, it remains the fifth highest score in the county's history. The score of 16 made by Warwickshire in 1913 is the lowest ever made against a Kent team. It was scored in the Warwickshire second innings, the team being bowled out in 45 minutes.

One of Kent's greatest bowlers, Colin Blythe, made his debut for the county on the Angel Ground in 1899. Playing against Yorkshire, he bowled Frank Mitchell with his first ball in first-class cricket, one of only three men to have taken a wicket with his first ball in first-class cricket whilst playing for Kent.

== The Tonbridge Nursery ==
In 1897, the ground became the base for the "Tonbridge Nursery", a player development centre established by Kent to train young professional cricketers. This was deemed necessary by the Kent Committee as after dominating county cricket in the early years of Queen Victoria's reign, the county had become a weaker team. When the County Championship was formally established in 1890, Kent were initially able to finish only in mid table and by 1896 the county's administrators had determined that something needed to be done to strengthen the team.

The establishment of the Nursery was one of the key developments that laid the foundations for the successes of the pre-World War I period during which Kent won the County Championship four times between 1906 and 1913. The Nursery was run by Captain William McCanlis and the set-up was overseen by Tonbridge man Tom Pawley, who became the club's general manager in 1898. It provided structured coaching and match practice for the young professionals who, by 1914, had become the basis of the Kent team, gradually taking the place of the amateurs who had dominated the county teams of the 1870s and 80s. By 1906 around 60% of all appearances were by professionals, with bowlers such as Colin Blythe and Arthur Fielder forming the core of the Kent attack. Professional batsmen such as Punter Humphreys, Frank Woolley and James Seymour became an increasing part of Kent's success, coming together with a group of "gifted" amateurs to produce strong batting lineups.

The Nursery began to pay dividends quickly and Kent finished third in the Championship in 1900, and by 1904 The Times was able to call it a "brilliant success". The nursery closed in 1927, with player development moving to the St Lawrence Ground at Canterbury.

== Wartime use and sale ==
Occasional wartime cricket matches were held on the ground and the final match, played in 1942, was abandoned after German bombers began to jettison bombs over the town. It was used as an Army vehicle park during the Second World War and the trustees of the club decided that the ground would require too much money spent on it to return the pitch to its pre-war condition. It was decided that the ground would be sold in 1944, the local council initially declining to purchase the site. In 1945 it was bought by greyhound racing promoters who were unable to obtain planning permission to develop the site and Tonbridge Urban District Council eventually purchased the ground for £7,500 in 1947, the cricket club moving to use grounds at Tonbridge School.

== Football venue ==
Following their formation and election to the Southern Football League, Tonbridge Angels F.C. leased the ground from the council and adopted it as their home ground in 1949. Their first match, against Hastings United, drew a crowd of 5,000, with Hastings eventually winning 2–1. The club continued to use the ground for more than 30 years.

The ground saw its record attendance for Tonbridge's 1951–52 FA Cup first-round tie against Aldershot F.C., when 8,236 supporters watched a 0–0 draw. Another FA Cup tie, against Charlton Athletic F.C. in 1972–73, saw 7,770 attend.

By 1977 the council required the ground for redevelopment. A three-year legal battle was fought, eventually reaching the High Court, before the council offered the club a new ground, the Longmead Stadium on the north-western edge of the town. The club took the old main stand with them from the ground and this remains in use at the new ground. The Angel Ground was sold for £1.7 million and the club played its last game at the ground in January 1980, with Mickey Angel scoring the last goal on the ground. They played the remainder of their home matches during the season at a variety of grounds across Kent before moving to the Longmead Stadium for the start of the 1980–81 season. The ground was demolished, with a Sainsbury's supermarket, department store and Angel leisure centre replacing it.
