= Kent County Cricket Club in 1910 =

Kent County Cricket Club
1910 season
- Captain: EW Dillon
- Ground(s): Canterbury; Dover; Gravesend; Maidstone; Tonbridge; Tunbridge Wells; Blackheath
- County Championship: 1st
- Most runs: E Humphreys (1,618)
- Most wickets: C Blythe (163)
- Most catches: FE Woolley (31)
- Most wicket-keeping dismissals: FH Huish (73)

Kent County Cricket Club's 1910 season was the 21st season in which the County competed in the County Championship. Kent played 29 first-class cricket matches during the season, losing only five matches overall, and won their third Championship title. They finished well ahead of second place Surrey in the 1910 County Championship.

All-rounder Frank Woolley, who was becoming an established international player, was selected as one of Wisden Cricketers of the Year in 1911 after a successful 1910 season.

The Championship title was the third of four by Kent in the years before the First World War. It followed their success in 1909. The club's fourth title was won in 1913.

== Background ==
After decades of underachievement, Kent won their first County Championship in 1906. A mid-table finished in 1907 was followed by second place in 1908, despite winning more matches than the Champions Yorkshire. A second Championship title followed in 1909 with the Kent team securing the title well before the end of the season after losing only two matches.

The re-emergence of strong Kent teams was based on the development of a mix of "gifted" amateurs playing alongside an increasingly strong core of professionals, most of whom were a product of the club's Tonbridge Nursery – its player development centre based at the Angel Ground at Tonbridge. By 1906 professionals were making around 60% of all appearances for Kent, a figure which rose to 68% in 1910 and provided a solid foundation for the team to achieve success on the field.

== 1910 season ==
Kent's opening match of the season, against the MCC at Lord's, was cancelled following the death of King Edward VII and the county began the 1910 season with a loss to Oxford University before the County Championship got under way with an innings victory against Middlesex at Lord's. The second match of the Championship season, against Lancashire, was declared as "Not counted" as there was no play on the second day, 20 May, due to the funeral of the King.

Four away Championship matches saw Kent win three times before losing to Leicestershire, a set of games which also featured a win against Cambridge University at Fenner's. Kent's first home game of the season was against Sussex at Tonbridge in June and saw the county begin a series of 10 unbeaten matches which lasted until the end of July. Eight of these matches were wins. A loss to Essex at Leyton was followed by seven successive winning matches, including two innings victories during Canterbury Cricket Week at the beginning of August.

By 12 August Kent had guaranteed the Championship title, the earliest date that the County Championship has ever been won. A loss against Championship runners-up Surrey at The Oval, a draw against Hampshire and a loss in the Champion County match in September completed the season.

== Players ==
The 1910 team was captained by Ted Dillon in his second year of captaincy and featured England international players Colin Blythe, Douglas Carr, Arthur Fielder, Kenneth Hutchings and Frank Woolley. Blythe and Woolley had toured South Africa with England over the 1909–10 English winter, but only Woolley, who had played in all five Test matches during the tour, would go on to play again for England, having debuted the summer before.

Carr, along with Arthur Day had been chosen as two of the five Wisden Cricketers of the Year in the 1910 edition of the almanack and Woolley was chosen in the 1911 edition. Fielder and Hutchings had been chosen in 1907 and Blythe in 1904. The nucleus of the team remained the same as the Championship winning teams of 1906 and 1909, with the core of the team increasingly becoming professionals who had developed in the county's Tonbridge Nursery. When Dillon, a shipbroker whose profession sometimes kept him away from cricket, was unable to play, former club captain Jack Mason generally led the team.

Fred Huish was the main wicket-keeper for Kent, with Jack Hubble replacing him in one non-Championship match. Huish, the senior professional in the Kent team at the time, was in the process of making 151 consecutive Championship appearances for Kent. Hubble, who succeeded Huish as wicket-keeper after World War I, played primarily as a batsman.

Former captain Cloudesley Marsham made his last first-class appearance for Kent before the First World War against Cambridge University and did not play in a Championship match during the season. Keith Barlow played against both Cambridge and Oxford University, the only first-class appearances of his career. Other than Barlow, four players made their senior debuts for Kent during 1910: Eric Hatfeild, Charles Hooman, Freddie Knott and Percy Morfee. Hooman appeared 15 times for the county during the season, his only season of first-class cricket with Kent.

List of players

Ages given as of the first day of Kent's 1910 County Championship season, 16 May 1910.

Name	Birth date	Batting style	Bowling style	Apps	Notes
K Barlow	27 August 1890 (aged 19)	Right	–	2	
C Blythe	30 May 1879 (aged 30)	Right	Slow left arm	26	
DW Carr	17 March 1872 (aged 38)	Right	Right arm leg-break	10	
AP Day	10 April 1885 (aged 25)	Right	Right arm leg-break Right arm fast-medium	9	
SH Day	29 December 1878 (aged 31)	Right	Right arm fast	1	
EW Dillon	15 February 1881 (aged 29)	Right	Right arm leg-break	23	Club captain
WJ Fairservice	16 May 1881 (aged 29)	Right	Right arm off-break	19	
A Fielder	19 July 1877 (aged 32)	Right	Right arm fast	18	
HTW Hardinge	25 February 1886 (aged 24)	Right	Slow left arm	5	
CE Hatfeild	11 March 1887 (aged 23)	Right	Slow left arm	2	
CVL Hooman	3 October 1887 (aged 22)	Right	Right arm medium	15	
JC Hubble	10 February 1881 (aged 29)	Right	–	18	Wicket-keeper
FH Huish	15 November 1869 (aged 40)	Right	–	28	Wicket-keeper
E Humphreys	24 August 1881 (aged 28)	Right	Slow left arm	29	
KL Hutchings	7 December 1882 (aged 27)	Right	Right arm fast	25	
DW Jennings	14 June 1889 (aged 20)	Right	–	2	
FH Knott	30 October 1891 (aged 18)	Right	Right arm leg-break	6	
CHB Marsham	10 February 1879 (aged 31)	Right	Slow left arm	1	
JR Mason	26 March 1874 (aged 36)	Right	Right arm fast-medium	9	
PE Morfee	2 May 1886 (aged 24)	Right	Right arm fast	5	
HJB Preston	25 October 1883 (aged 26)	Right	Right arm medium	7	
J Seymour	25 October 1879 (aged 30)	Right	Right arm off-break	29	
LHW Troughton	17 May 1879 (aged 30)	Right	Right arm medium	1	
FE Woolley	27 May 1887 (aged 22)	Left	Slow left arm Left arm medium	29	

Source: CricketArchive and Cricinfo statistics

== Statistics ==
During 1910 Kent played 29 first-class matches, including 26 in the County Championship. They won 20, drew four and lost five matches, with 19 of the wins and only three losses occurring in the Championship. One match, against the MCC, was cancelled following the death of Edward VII.

Match type	P	W	L	D	Tie	Ab	Can	NC	Pts	Pos
County Championship	26	19	3	3	0	0	–	1	19	1st
Other first-class matches	4	1	2	0	0	0	1	–	–	–

Punter Humphreys led the county in run scoring with a total of 1,618 runs, including 1,483 in the County Championship. James Seymour, Kenneth Hutchings and Frank Woolley each scored over 1,000 runs for Kent, with Ted Dillon adding 919. Hutchings scored four centuries for Kent, with Humphreys, Seymour and Woolley each scoring three. Humphreys' score of 200 not out against Lancashire at Tunbridge Wells was the highest score for Kent during the season and was his second double century for the county. At the time it was the third highest score in Kent history, beaten only by the 208 he had scored in 1909 and James Seymour's 204 from the 1907 season. Seymour made a top score of 193 against Middlesex at Canterbury in 1910, Kent's second highest score of the year.

Seymour and Hutchings shared a partnership of 205 at Derby which was the highest third-wicket partnership of the Championship season and Humphreys and Arthur Day's stand of 254 was the highest fifth-wicket partnership of the season, set against Lancashire at Tunbridge Wells. As of 2016 this remains the highest fifth-wicket partnership at the Nevill Ground. Kent's total of 607/6 declared against Gloucestershire at Cheltenham was the highest team total of the Championship season and, as of 2016, remains Kent's highest score against Gloucestershire on any ground.

Colin Blythe was Kent's leading wicket taker in 1910, taking 149 Championship wickets at an average of 13.77. He took 165 wickets in total during the season for Kent, including taking 10 wickets in a match four times and five wickets in an innings 17 times during the season with his left arm spin bowling. Frank Woolley was the second leading wicket-taker with 132 wickets, whilst Arthur Fielder, with 77, Douglas Carr, with 63, and Bill Fairservice, with 37, also made significant bowling contributions.

Blythe took two hat tricks during the season, against Surrey at Blackheath and against Derbyshire at Gravesend. These were the only two hat-tricks Blythe took for Kent in his prodigious career for the county. Frank Woolley returned the best innings bowling figures for Kent during the season, taking 8/52 against Sussex at Hastings. Arthur Fielder had the best match figures of 12/76 at Northampton.

Fred Huish claimed 73 wicket-keeping dismissals for Kent during the season, including 41 catches and 32 stumpings. Frank Woolley took 31 catches and James Seymour 30 catches during the season as part of Kent's well respected slip cordon. Humphreys, Seymour and Woolley played in every match for Kent during 1910, with Huish also playing in every Championship fixture.

=== Batting statistics ===
The table below includes all first-class batting for Kent during the 1910 season.

First-class batting for Kent, 1910
Player	Matches	Innings	NO	Runs	HS	Ave	100	50
K Barlow	2	3	0	11	6	3.67	0	0
C Blythe	26	34	6	378	37	13.50	0	0
DW Carr	10	12	4	91	21*	11.38	0	0
AP Day	9	12	1	355	111*	32.27	2	0
SH Day	1	1	0	15	15	15.00	0	0
EW Dillon	23	37	0	919	138	24.84	2	2
WJ Fairservice	19	26	4	275	37*	12.50	0	0
A Fielder	18	22	12	141	17*	14.10	0	0
HTW Hardinge	5	8	2	158	41*	26.33	0	0
CE Hatfeild	2	4	0	39	15	9.75	0	0
CVL Hooman	15	24	2	569	73	25.86	0	4
JC Hubble	18	27	4	524	84	22.78	0	2
FH Huish	28	41	5	417	44*	11.58	0	0
E Humphreys	29	46	2	1,618	200*	36.77	3	7
KL Hutchings	25	36	2	1,461	144	42.97	4	8
DW Jennings	2	2	0	18	18	9.00	0	0
FH Knott	6	10	1	332	114	36.89	1	0
CHB Marsham	1	1	0	13	13	13.00	0	0
JR Mason	9	13	3	313	121*	31.30	1	1
PE Morfee	5	8	2	36	10	6.00	0	0
HJB Preston	7	11	5	40	18	6.67	0	0
J Seymour	29	46	4	1,546	193	36.81	3	7
LHW Troughton	1	2	0	8	6	4.00	0	0
FE Woolley	29	43	2	1,050	120	25.61	3	3

Source: CricketArchive statistics and scorecards.

=== Bowling statistics ===
The table below includes all first-class bowling for Kent during the 1910 season.

First-class bowling for Kent, 1910
Player	Overs	Maidens	Runs	Wickets	BBI	Ave	5w	10w
C Blythe	971.1	251	2,338	163	7/53	14.34	17	4
DW Carr	309.2	72	895	63	8/86	14.21	6	2
AP Day	6	0	23	0	–	–	–	–
EW Dillon	2	0	2	0	–	–	–	–
WJ Fairservice	256.4	60	652	37	6/24	17.62	2	0
A Fielder	481.1	86	1,493	77	7/24	19.39	7	1
HTW Hardinge	1	0	4	0	–	–	–	–
E Humphreys	50.5	13	143	6	3/69	23.83	0	0
KL Hutchings	2	0	5	1	1/5	5.00	0	0
JR Mason	74.3	14	208	12	3/34	17.33	0	0
PE Morfee	108.1	21	362	16	5/47	22.63	1	0
HJB Preston	117	23	296	14	4/8	21.14	0	0
FE Woolley	695.3	169	1,845	132	8/52	13.98	11	1

Source: CricketArchive statistics and scorecards.

== See also ==
- 1910 English cricket season
- List of Kent County Cricket Club seasons
