= 1910 English cricket season =

The 1910 English cricket season was the 21st since the beginning of the County Championship.

== Honours ==
- County Championship – Kent
- Minor Counties Championship – Norfolk
- Wisden Cricketers of the Year – Harry Foster, Alfred Hartley, Charles Llewellyn, Razor Smith, Frank Woolley. (Note: As announced in Wisden's 1911 edition.)

== 1910 County Championship ==
For the first time since the official County Championship began, the scoring system was changed. Several matches were either abandoned owing to the death of King Edward VII, or limited to two days on account of the funeral of the King. It was later agreed not to count these games as "matches played" under the new point system.

Proposals to reform the game as a result of financial losses by many counties in the wet summer of 1909 – including a proposal by Lord Hawke of relegation and promotion as practiced by The Football League – led to first Warwickshire and then Lancashire advocating a plan under which only wins would count in determining a county's position. This would be adopted as a trial on 26 April, a few days before the season started.

	County	Played	Won	Lost	Drawn	Abandoned	Pts	%
1	Kent	25	19	3	3	1	19	76.00
2	Surrey	28	16	7	15	2	16	57.14
3	Middlesex	22	11	5	6	0	11	50.00
4	Lancashire	29	14	5	10	1	14	48.27
5	Nottinghamshire	20	9	4	7	0	9	45.00
6	Hampshire	24	10	10	4	0	10	41.66
7	Sussex	25	10	9	6	1	10	40.00
8	Yorkshire	27	10	7	10	1	10	37.06
9	Northamptonshire	19	7	8	4	1	7	36.84
10	Leicestershire	17	6	11	0	1	6	35.29
11	Essex	17	5	8	14	1	5	29.41
12	Gloucestershire	20	5	11	4	0	5	25.00
13	Worcestershire	22	5	8	9	0	5	22.72
14	Warwickshire	19	4	8	7	1	4	21.05
15	Derbyshire	20	2	14	4	2	2	10.00
16	Somerset	18	0	15	3	0	0	0.00
Details as recorded in John Wisden’s Cricketers’ Almanack

- One point was awarded for a win. Final placings were decided by dividing the number of points earned by the number of completed matches (i.e. those that ended in a win, loss or draw), and multiplying by 100.

== Minor Counties Championship ==
For this season, the four-division format would be replaced by a two-division format of "North and East" and "South and West", following a meeting at Lord's in September 1909. Each team would play at least four opponents from their own division home and away, and the winners of the two divisions would meet in a final to decide the Minor Counties Champion.

=== North and East ===
	County	Played	Won	Won on 1st inns	No Result	Possible points	Points obtained	%
1	Norfolk	10	6	2	0	50	36	72.00
2	Suffolk	8	5	1	0	40	28	70,00
3	Yorkshire Second Eleven	10	4	2	1	45	26	57.77
4	Northumberland	8	4	1	0	40	23	57.50
5	Staffordshire	12	6	1	0	60	33	55.00
6	Lincolnshire	10	3	2	0	50	21	42.00
7	Durham	10	4	0	0	50	20	40.00
8	Nottinghamshire Second Eleven	10	2	2	1	45	16	35.55
9	Bedfordshire	8	2	0	0	40	10	25.00
10	Cheshire	10	0	4	0	50	12	24.00
11	Cambridgeshire	8	0	0	0	40	0	0.00

=== South and West ===
Berkshire won the South and West division over Glamorgan by virtue of having a better batting average over the season. The teams had tied for first place with 45 points and 90%.

	County	Played	Won	Won on 1st inns	No Result	Possible points	Points obtained	%
1	Berkshire	10	9	0	0	50	45	90.00
2	Glamorgan	10	9	0	0	50	45	90.00
3	Monmouthshire	8	5	1	0	40	28	70.00
4	Surrey Second Eleven	10	5	2	1	45	31	68.88
5	Carmarthenshire	8	3	0	0	40	15	37.50
5	Hertfordshire	8	3	0	0	40	15	37.50
7	Devon	10	2	2	2	45	16	35.55
8	Dorset	10	2	1	1	50	13	26.00
9	Cornwall	8	2	0	0	40	10	25.00
10	Wiltshire	10	1	2	0	50	11	22.00
11	Buckinghamshire	8	0	0	0	40	0	0.00

=== Final ===
31 August 1910

Norfolk	v	Berkshire
397; G.A. Stevens 201, N.W. Stevens 57; Belcher 4/101		153; C.Y. Nepean 40; Allsopp 5/42, G.B. Raikes 4/50
		94 Allsopp 3/15

Norfolk won by an innings and 150 runs
County Ground, Lakenham

- Berkshire won the toss and decided to bat.

== Leading batsmen (qualification 20 innings) ==
1910 English season leading batsmen
Name	Team	Matches	Innings	Not outs	Runs	Highest score	Average	100s
Johnny Tyldesley	Lancashire	35	51	4	2265	158	46.22	7
Kenneth Hutchings	Kent	29	42	2	1654	144	41.35	5
Plum Warner	Middlesex; MCC	27	44	4	1646	150 not out	41.15	5
Cecil Wood	Leicestershire	19	35	2	1250	99	37.87	0
Jack Sharp	Lancashire	33	45	2	1626	150	37.81	4
Alfred Hartley	Lancashire	32	47	4	1585	234	36.86	3
Henry Foster	Worcestershire	16	28	0	1032	126	36.85	3
James Seymour	Kent	29	46	4	1546	193	36.80	3
Punter Humphreys	Kent	29	46	2	1618	200 not out	36.77	3
Frank Tarrant	Middlesex; MCC	26	41	2	1415	142	36.53	3

== Leading bowlers (qualification 1,000 balls) ==
1910 English season leading bowlers
Name	Team	Matches	Balls bowled	Runs conceded	Wickets taken	Average	Best bowling	5 wickets in innings	10 wickets in match
J.T. Hearne	Middlesex; MCC	21	4512	1523	119	12.79	8/34	11	3
Razor Smith	Surrey	36	8541	3225	247	13.05	8/13	26	8
Douglas Carr	Kent	10	1856	895	63	14.20	8/86	6	2
Colin Blythe	Kent	25	6249	2497	175	14.26	7/53	18	4
Frank Woolley	Kent	31	4389	1973	136	14.50	8/52	11	1
George Hirst	Yorkshire	36	6127	2426	164	14.79	9/23	11	2
Harry Dean	Lancashire	29	5799	2113	137	15.42	9/77	8	4
Philip Le Couteur	Oxford University	14	1991	1151	72	15.98	6/20	6	3
Frank Tarrant	Middlesex; MCC	26	5595	2169	134	16.18	7/42	12	3
James Iremonger	Nottinghamshire	21	3711	1358	79	17.18	7/35	6	1

== Annual reviews ==
- John Wisden's Cricketers' Almanack, 1911
