= Kent County Cricket Club in 1909 =

Kent County Cricket Club
1909 season
- Captain: EW Dillon
- Ground(s): Canterbury; Catford; Dover; Gravesend; Tonbridge; Tunbridge Wells; Blackheath
- County Championship: 1st
- Most runs: E Humphreys (1,390)
- Most wickets: C Blythe (185)
- Most catches: J Seymour (38)
- Most wicket-keeping dismissals: FH Huish (63)

Kent County Cricket Club's 1909 season was the twentieth season in which the county club competed in the County Championship. Kent played 30 first-class cricket matches during the season, losing only two matches overall, and won their second championship title. They finished clearly ahead of second place Lancashire in the 1909 County Championship with the previous year's winners, Yorkshire, in third place.

Two of the county's players, Arthur Day and Douglas Carr, were selected as Wisden Cricketers of the Year in 1910 as a result of their performances during the season. Carr made his debut in first-class cricket during the season at the age of 37 and played in his only Test match in August.

The championship title was the second of four by Kent during the Golden Age of cricket in the years leading up to the First World War. It followed their first title in 1906, with the nucleus of the team unchanged from then. It was followed by their third title in 1910 and fourth in 1913.

== Background ==
After decades of underachievement, Kent won their first County Championship in 1906, with "the best county team of the year" which "showed the most brilliant form". The re-emergence of strong Kent teams was based on the development of a mix of "gifted" amateurs playing alongside an increasingly strong core of professionals, most of whom were a product of the club's Tonbridge Nursery – its player development centre based at the Angel Ground at Tonbridge. By 1906 professionals were making around 60% of all appearances for Kent, a figure which had increased markedly since the establishment of the Nursery in 1897 and provided a much firmer foundation for the team to achieve success on the field.

After the success of 1906, Kent finished eighth in the County Championship in 1907 and second in 1908, winning more games than the champions Yorkshire but losing three compared to Yorkshire's unbeaten season. C. H. B. Marsham, who had captained the team in 1906, gave up the captaincy at the end of 1908 and Ted Dillon was appointed to lead the team.

== 1909 season ==
Kent started the season with a match against the MCC at Lord's, which they won by 97 runs before the County Championship got under way with six away matches. The series of games saw four wins and two draws, with the first three all won by an innings. A match against Oxford University divided this series of Championship matches and was also won by the margin of an innings.

A draw against Essex in Kent's first home match of the season in June at Catford was followed by two losses to Worcestershire and Lancashire, both matches taking place at Tonbridge. These were to be the only two losses of the Championship season as Kent went unbeaten for the remainder of the season.

Seven wins and a draw from the middle of June to the end of July saw Kent in a commanding position in the Championship. These included an innings victory against Gloucestershire at Catford which saw Kent score 593, the second highest total in the Championship in 1909. They were to continue their good form in August, winning their first two matches of the month during Canterbury Cricket Week and going on to draw three and win three of the remaining Championship matches, including a rain affected draw against third placed Yorkshire at Dover. A match against the touring Australian team at Canterbury in the middle of the month was also a rain-affected draw.

A draw, despite being asked to follow-on in a rain-shortened match, in the Champion County match in September at The Oval completed the season.

== Players ==
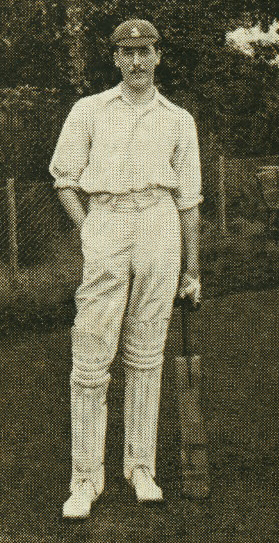
Frank Woolley who made 29 appearances for Kent in 1909

The 1909 team was captained by Ted Dillon in his first year of captaincy and featured England international players Colin Blythe, Kenneth Hutchings and Arthur Fielder. All three had toured Australia over the 1907–08 winter. Frank Woolley made his Test debut during the summer against the touring Australians, the first of his 64 Tests, with Douglas Carr making his sole Test appearance in the same match.

Carr, who bowled leg-spin and who was an early proponent of the relatively new googly delivery, made his first-class cricket debut against Oxford University in May at the age of 37. He had not previously played any first-class cricket but, after developing his googly in 1908, he used it so well in club cricket that Kent offered him a trial. He had played only six first-class matches when he was selected for the fifth Test of the summer's Ashes series, taking five wickets in the first Australian innings and seven overall in the match.

Carr capped his remarkable rise to fame by being selected as one of Wisden's five Cricketers of the Year in 1910 alongside batsman Arthur Day. He played only one Test, although he made regular appearances for Kent until the end of the 1913 season.

Dillon was unavailable from early August and Jack Mason, who had been club captain between 1897 and 1902, stepped in to captain the team in the last five Championship matches. The 1909 team also included Woolley, by now a well-established all-rounder, and James Seymour who each played in 29 of the 30 matches in the season as well as Punter Humphreys, Bill Fairservice, Fred Huish and Wally Hardinge, all six of whom were professionals and provided the core of the Kent team for the season. Huish was the main wicket-keeper and was considered the senior professional, beginning a streak of 151 consecutive County Championship appearances in 1909. The reserve wicket-keeper was Jack Hubble who, as a result of Huish's dominant position, played only two matches in 1909.

As well as Carr, batsmen David Jennings and Harold Prest made their debuts for Kent in 1909, Jennings playing once and Prest four times.

List of players

Ages given as of the first day of Kent's 1909 County Championship season, 17 May 1909.

Name	Birth date	Batting style	Bowling style	Apps	Notes
C Blythe	30 May 1879 (aged 29)	Right	Slow left arm	28	
DW Carr	17 March 1872 (aged 37)	Right	Right arm leg-break	11	
AP Day	10 April 1885 (aged 24)	Right	Right arm leg-break Right arm fast-medium	20	
SH Day	29 December 1878 (aged 30)	Right	Right arm fast	11	
EW Dillon	15 February 1881 (aged 28)	Right	Right arm leg-break	24	Club captain
WJ Fairservice	16 May 1881 (aged 28)	Right	Right arm off-break	24	
A Fielder	19 July 1877 (aged 31)	Right	Right arm fast	23	
HTW Hardinge	25 February 1886 (aged 23)	Right	Slow left arm	17	
JC Hubble	10 February 1881 (aged 28)	Right	–	2	Wicket-keeper
FH Huish	15 November 1869 (aged 39)	Right	–	28	Wicket-keeper
E Humphreys	24 August 1881 (aged 27)	Right	Slow left arm	28	
KL Hutchings	7 December 1882 (aged 26)	Right	Right arm fast	29	
DW Jennings	14 June 1889 (aged 19)	Right	–	1	
CHB Marsham	10 February 1879 (aged 30)	Right	–	2	
JR Mason	26 March 1874 (aged 35)	Right	Right arm fast-medium	14	Acted as captain for much of August
HEW Prest	9 January 1890 (aged 19)	Right	–	4	
HJB Preston	25 October 1883 (aged 25)	Right	Right arm medium	4	
J Seymour	25 October 1879 (aged 29)	Right	Right arm off-break	29	
LHW Troughton	17 May 1879 (aged 30)	Right	Right arm medium	3	
FE Woolley	27 May 1887 (aged 21)	Left	Slow left arm Left arm medium	29	

Source: CricketArchive and Cricinfo statistics

== Statistics ==
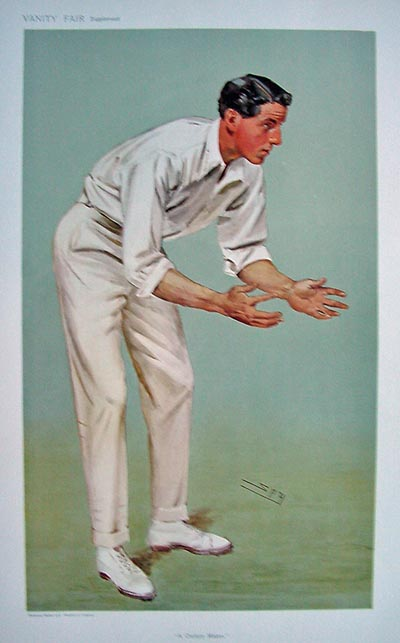
Kenneth Hutchings who led Kent in County Championship run scoring in 1909

During 1909 Kent played 30 first-class matches, including 26 in the County Championship. They won 18, drew ten and lost only two matches, both during Tonbridge week in June.

Match type	P	W	L	D	Tie	Ab	Pts	Pos
County Championship	26	16	2	8	0	0	14	1st
Other first-class matches	4	2	0	2	0	0	–	–

Punter Humphreys led the county in run scoring with a total of 1,390 runs, including 1,207 in the County Championship, closely followed by Kenneth Hutchings with 1,368 total runs. Hutchings led the Championship aggregate for Kent with 1,251 runs. Frank Woolley, James Seymour and Arthur Day also scored more than 1,000 runs for Kent during the season. Day and Hutchings both scored three centuries, as did Jack Mason who averaged 65.25 with the bat in 14 innings. Humphreys scored the county's highest score of the season with 208, at the time a record highest individual score for Kent.

Woolley and Arthur Fielder shared a partnership of 235 for the tenth wicket against Worcestershire at Amblecote. As of August 2025, this remains the highest last-wicket partnership in the County Championship. The pair came together when Kent were still 40 behind Worcestershire's first innings of 360 and raised Kent's total to 555 before Kent went on to win by an innings. Woolley, who scored 185, had retired hurt earlier in the innings after being hit in the mouth by a ball from Ted Arnold. Fielder contributed 112 not out to the partnership, the only first-class century of his career.

Colin Blythe was Kent's leading wicket taker in 1909, taking 178 Championship wickets at an average of 14.07, a total which led all bowlers in the Championship. He took 185 wickets in total during the season for Kent, including taking 10 wickets in a match five times and five wickets in an innings 18 times during the season with his left arm spin bowling. Fast bowler Arthur Fielder took 95 wickets, while spinners Woolley, Douglas Carr and Bill Fairservice all made significant contributions.

Kent's best individual bowling figures for the season were Blythe's 9/42 taken against Leicestershire in May, closely followed by the same bowler's 9/44 against Northamptonshire in the same month. His 16/102 in the match against Leicestershire were the season's best bowling figures in the County Championship, followed by his 14/75 in the match against Northamptonshire.

Fred Huish made 63 wicket-keeping dismissals for Kent during the season, including 35 catches and 22 stumpings in the County Championship. James Seymour took 35 catches in the Championship as part of Kent's well respected slip cordon. Seymour played in every Championship match for Kent during the season, with Blythe, Humphreys, Hutchings and Woolley all playing in 25.

=== Batting statistics ===
The table below includes all first-class batting for Kent during the 1909 season.

First-class batting
Player	Matches	Innings	NO	Runs	HS	Ave	100	50
C Blythe	28	33	5	237	38	8.46	0	0
DW Carr	11	10	1	66	20	7.33	0	0
AP Day	20	24	1	1,014	177	44.09	3	5
SH Day	11	14	2	471	86	39.25	0	3
EW Dillon	24	33	2	823	89	26.55	0	4
WJ Fairservice	23	30	6	457	49*	19.04	0	0
A Fielder	23	27	14	278	112*	21.38	1	0
HTW Hardinge	17	24	1	429	62	18.65	0	3
JC Hubble	2	2	0	30	17	15.00	0	0
FH Huish	28	35	8	537	65	19.89	0	1
E Humphreys	28	39	4	1,390	208	39.71	2	7
KL Hutchings	29	36	1	1,368	155	39.09	3	8
DW Jennings	1	1	0	4	4	4.00	0	0
CHB Marsham	2	3	0	37	29	12.33	0	0
JR Mason	14	14	2	783	179*	65.25	3	2
HEW Prest	4	5	0	125	57	25.00	0	1
HJB Preston	4	4	2	20	6	10.00	0	0
J Seymour	29	38	1	1,041	88	28.14	0	10
LHW Troughton	3	4	0	74	46	18.50	0	0
FE Woolley	29	34	0	1,146	185	33.71	2	6

Source: CricketArchive statistics and scorecards.

=== Bowling statistics ===
The table below includes all first-class bowling for Kent during the 1909 season.

First-class bowling
Player	Overs	Maidens	Runs	Wickets	BBI	Ave	5w	10w
C Blythe	1,135.3	314	2,760	185	9/42	14.92	18	5
DW Carr	378.5	77	1,007	61	8/36	16.51	5	1
AP Day	27	3	74	0	–	–	–	–
SH Day	9	0	48	1	1/18	48.00	0	0
EW Dillon	14	2	55	0	–	–	–	–
WJ Fairservice	472.3	139	1,171	45	5/28	26.02	2	1
A Fielder	590	117	1,938	95	8/64	20.40	9	3
HTW Hardinge	356	2	39	1	1/15	39.00	0	0
E Humphreys	133	36	356	10	3/29	35.60	0	0
KL Hutchings	11	3	29	0	–	–	–	–
CHB Marsham	5.5	0	48	0	–	–	–	–
JR Mason	204.1	50	545	21	3/41	25.95	0	0
HJB Preston	36	12	95	4	2/39	23.75	0	0
J Seymour	22	1	98	2	1/13	49.00	0	0
FE Woolley	523.2	130	1,336	70	7/42	19.09	2	0

Source: CricketArchive statistics and scorecards.

== See also ==
- 1909 English cricket season
- List of Kent County Cricket Club seasons
