= 1910 in sports =

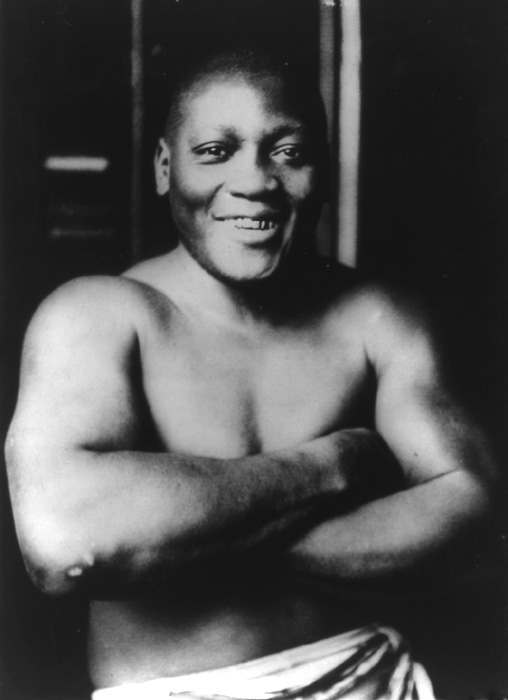
Jack Johnson defended his world title against former champion James J. Jeffries

1910 in sports describes the year's events in world sport.

== American football ==
College championship

- College football national champions – Harvard Crimson

Professional championship

- Ohio League champions – Shelby Blues and Shelby Tigers (shared)

== Association football ==
England

- The Football League – Aston Villa 53 points, Liverpool 48, Blackburn Rovers 45, Newcastle United 45, Manchester United 45, Sheffield United 42
- FA Cup final – Newcastle United 2–0 Barnsley at Crystal Palace, London (replay following 1–1 draw at Crystal Palace)
- Manchester United moves from its venue at Bank Street to its present home Old Trafford

Germany

- National Championship – Karlsruher FV (0–0) 1–0 Holstein Kiel at Köln
- Foundation of FC St. Pauli (15 May)

Norway

- Foundation of Bærum SK (26 March)

Scotland

- Scottish Football League – Celtic
- Scottish Cup final – Dundee 2–1 Clyde at Ibrox Park (2nd replay, following 2–2 and 0–0 draws)
- Ayr United formed following a merger between Ayr Parkhouse and Ayr FC

== Australian rules football ==
VFL Premiership

- St. Kilda achieves the worst start by a team that did not suffer a winless season, losing its first seventeen games before a huge upset over Carlton. This has been equalled only by Fremantle in 2001 and Greater Western Sydney in 2013.
- Collingwood wins the 14th VFL premiership, defeating Carlton 9.7 (61) to 6.11 (47) at Melbourne Cricket Ground (MCG)

== Bandy ==
Sweden

- Championship final – IFK Uppsala 2–0 IFK Stockholm

== Baseball ==
World Series

- 17–23 October — Philadelphia Athletics (AL) defeats Chicago Cubs (NL) to win the 1910 World Series by 4 games to 1

== Boxing ==
Events

- 22 February — Ad Wolgast outlasts Battling Nelson at Point Richmond, California, to win the World Lightweight Championship by a technical knockout after 40 rounds.
- 4 July — in boxing's first "fight of the century", Jack Johnson knocks out the "great white hope" James J. Jeffries in round 15 to retain his World Heavyweight Championship title.
- 15 October — World Middleweight Champion Stanley Ketchel is shot and killed at Conway, Missouri, by Walter Dipley, a jealous farm worker. Ketchel is rated by many boxing historians as the best middleweight ever. The title remains vacant until 1913.

Lineal world champions

- World Heavyweight Championship – Jack Johnson
- World Light Heavyweight Championship – vacant
- World Middleweight Championship – Stanley Ketchel → vacant
- World Welterweight Championship – vacant
- World Lightweight Championship – Battling Nelson → Ad Wolgast
- World Featherweight Championship – Abe Attell
- World Bantamweight Championship – Monte Attell

== Canadian football ==
- The Saskatchewan Rugby Football Union adopts CRU rules
- Interprovincial Rugby Football Union - Hamilton Tigers
- Ontario Rugby Football Union - Toronto Athletic Club
- Manitoba Rugby Football Union - Winnipeg Rowing Club
- Intercollegiate Rugby Football Union - University of Toronto
- Saskatchewan Rugby Football Union - Moose Jaw
- Calgary defeats Edmonton to win the Alberta Rugby Football League
- 2nd Grey Cup – University of Toronto defeats Hamilton 16-7

== Cricket ==
England

- County Championship – Kent
- Minor Counties Championship – Norfolk
- Most runs – Johnny Tyldesley 2265 @ 46.22 (HS 158)
- Most wickets – Razor Smith 247 @ 13.05 (BB 8–13)
- Wisden Cricketers of the Year – Harry Foster, Alfred Hartley, Charlie Llewellyn, Razor Smith, Frank Woolley

Australia

- Sheffield Shield – South Australia
- Most runs – Bert Kortlang 656 @ 131.20 (HS 197)
- Most wickets – Jack Saunders 49 @ 17.32 (BB 6–35)

India

- Bombay Triangular – Europeans shared with Parsees

New Zealand

- Plunket Shield – Auckland

South Africa

- Currie Cup – not contested

West Indies

- Inter-Colonial Tournament – Trinidad and Tobago

== Cycling ==
Tour de France

- Octave Lapize (France) wins the 8th Tour de France

== Figure skating ==
World Figure Skating Championships

- World Men's Champion – Ulrich Salchow (Sweden)
- World Women's Champion – Lily Kronberger (Hungary)
- World Pairs Champions – Anna Hübler and Heinrich Burger (Germany)

== Golf ==
Major tournaments

- British Open – James Braid
- US Open – Alex Smith

Other tournaments

- British Amateur – John Ball
- US Amateur – William C. Fownes Jr.

== Horse racing ==
England

- Grand National – Jenkinstown
- 1,000 Guineas Stakes – Winkipop
- 2,000 Guineas Stakes – Neil Gow
- The Derby – Lemberg
- The Oaks – Rosedrop
- St. Leger Stakes – Swynford

Australia

- Melbourne Cup – Comedy King

Canada

- King's Plate – Parmer

Ireland

- Irish Grand National – Oniche
- Irish Derby Stakes – Aviator

USA

- Kentucky Derby – Donau
- Preakness Stakes – Layminster
- Belmont Stakes – Sweep

== Ice hockey ==
Stanley Cup

- 15 March — Montreal Wanderers wins the NHA championship and the Stanley Cup. The club then defeats Berlin Dutchmen in a challenge.

Events

- 5 January — National Hockey Association (NHA) commences its inaugural season
- 15 January — Canadian Hockey Association disbands. Ottawa and Montreal Shamrocks join the NHA.
- March — Toronto St. Michael's Majors wins the Allan Cup
- December — NHA loses its Cobalt and Haileybury teams, but gains a Quebec team. The Montreal Canadiens are taken over by George Kennedy's Club Athletique Canadien after threatening legal action.

== Rowing ==
The Boat Race

- 23 March — Oxford wins the 67th Oxford and Cambridge Boat Race

== Rugby league ==
England

- Championship – Oldham
- Challenge Cup final – Leeds 26–12 Hull F.C. at Fartown Ground, Huddersfield (replay, following 7–7 draw at Fartown)
- Lancashire League Championship – Oldham
- Yorkshire League Championship – Wakefield Trinity
- Lancashire County Cup – Wigan 22–5 Leigh
- Yorkshire County Cup – Huddersfield 21–0 Batley

Australia

- 1910 Great Britain Lions tour
- 17 September — the 1910 NSWRFL season culminates in a grand final between South Sydney and Newtown which is drawn 4–4. Newtown are crowned premiers by virtue of being minor premiers.

== Rugby union ==
Five Nations Championship

- France joins the Home Nations Championship which is now called the Five Nations Championship
- 28th Five Nations Championship series is won by England

== Speed skating ==
Speed Skating World Championships

- Men's All-round Champion – Nikolay Strunnikov (Russia)

== Tennis ==
Australia

- Australian Men's Singles Championship – Rodney Heath (Australia) defeats Horace Rice (Australia) 6–4 6–3 6–2

England

- Wimbledon Men's Singles Championship – Anthony Wilding (New Zealand) defeats Arthur Gore (GB) 6–4 7–5 4–6 6–2
- Wimbledon Women's Singles Championship – Dorothea Douglass Lambert Chambers (GB) defeats Dora Boothby (GB) 6–2 6–2

France

- French Men's Singles Championship – Maurice Germot (France) defeats François Blanchy (France): details unknown
- French Women's Singles Championship – Jeanne Matthey (France) defeats Marguerite Broquedis (France): details unknown

USA

- American Men's Singles Championship – William Larned (USA) defeats Tom Bundy (USA) 6–1 5–7 6–0 6–8 6–1
- American Women's Singles Championship – Hazel Hotchkiss Wightman (USA) defeats Louise Hammond (USA) 6–4 6–2

Davis Cup

- 1910 International Lawn Tennis Challenge – Australasia walkover British Isles
