= Keith Barlow =

English cricketer and businessman

Personal information
- Born: 27 August 1890; Kensington, London
- Died: 5 April 1930 (aged 39); Kensington, London
- Batting: Right-handed

Domestic team information
- Years: Team
- 1910: Kent

Career statistics
Competition	First-class
Matches	2
Runs scored	11
Batting average	3.66
100s/50s	0/0
Top score	6
Catches/stumpings	1/–
- Source: CricInfo, 3 February 2012

Keith Barlow (27 August 1890 – 5 April 1930) was an English amateur cricketer and chairman of the paper manufacturer Wiggins Teape. Barlow played two first-class cricket matches for Kent County Cricket Club and was associated with the club as a member of the Committee in the 1920s. He was a right-handed batsman who died in 1930 aged 39 after suffering from ill health for much of his life.

== Early and family life ==
Barlow was the second son of Alice and Edward Percy Barlow and was born at Kensington in London in August 1890. His father was the chairman of paper manufacturer Wiggins Teape which operated the Buckland paper mill near Dover in Kent. Under Edward Barlow's chairmanship the conqueror brand was developed at Buckland Mill in the late 1880s and Wiggins Teape became one of the leading manufacturers of high quality paper. He purchased the Kearsney Court estate on the edge of Dover in 1900 and commissioned Thomas Mawson to design the gardens, one of Mawson's first independent commissions.

Barlow was educated as a boarder at Wootton near Dover before ill health forced him to be educated at home. He worked for his father's business in Dover in 1910–11 alongside Kent and England cricketer Kenneth Hutchings, who was sponsored by the business, and joined the British Army as a reserve officer in 1911. He became a director of Wiggins Teape in 1912, the year his father died, and married Elsie Allen in 1913. The couple had two sons.

== Cricket career ==
Barlow made a single appearance for the Kent County Cricket Club Second XI in 1909. He made his only first-class cricket appearances in 1910, playing in Kent's two University matches during the season against Oxford University at University Parks, and Cambridge University at Fenner's. Barlow scored 11 runs in his three first-class innings and took one catch in a Kent team which went on to win the 1910 County Championship, repeating the county's success of 1909. Barlow continued to play occasionally for the Kent Second XI in 1910 and 1911 before making a final appearance during the 1913 season, He made a total of 13 appearances for the Second XI, including six in the Minor Counties Championship, making a number of "useful" scores batting. He also played club cricket for Band of Brothers, associated with Kent's county team.

== Military career ==
Barlow was commissioned as a 2nd Lieutenant in the Royal East Kent Mounted Rifles (REKMR), part of the reserve Territorial Force South Eastern Mounted Brigade, in 1911 alongside fellow Kent cricketers Allan Leach-Lewis and Eric Hatfeild as well as James Tylden, who went on to play for Kent after the war. His unit was mobilised in Canterbury on 4 August 1914 at the beginning of the First World War, and Barlow was appointed Acting Captain on 30 October. He remained in the UK when the first line elements of the REKMR were sent to the Gallipoli Campaign in September 1915, serving as second in command of the 3/1st REKMR.

Barlow relinquished his commission due to ill health in December 1915, having been declared unfit for service by a medical board. He was found to be suffering from chronic nephritis, hardening of the arteries and high blood pressure. He had suffered nephritis, an inflammation of the kidneys, for 12 years and the disease was responsible for his ill health throughout much of his life.

Barlow was awarded a Silver War Badge in 1916. He requested a medical re-examination in 1917 but was found permanently unfit for service.

== Later life ==
Barlow was appointed Chairman of Wiggins Teape in 1925, having been a director since 1912. He was treasurer of the Royal St George's Golf Club in Sandwich and was elected a General Committee member at Kent County Cricket Club in 1920. He died at Kensington in April 1930, aged 39.

== Bibliography ==
- Carlaw, Derek (2020). Kent County Cricketers, A to Z: Part One (1806–1914) (PDF). Cardiff: ACS.
