= Edward Colebrooke (cricketer) =

English cricketer

Personal information
- Full name: Edward Lotherington Colebrooke
- Born: 29 October 1858; Southborough, Kent, England
- Died: 10 August 1939 (aged 80); Canterbury, Kent, England
- Batting: Right-handed
- Relatives: Kenneth Hutchings (nephew); Frederick Hutchings (nephew); William Hutchings (nephew)

Domestic team information
- Years: Team
- 1880: Oxford University

Career statistics
Competition	First-class
Matches	7
Runs scored	161
Batting average	13.41
100s/50s	–/–
Top score	34*
Catches/stumpings	6/–
- Source: Cricinfo, 6 August 2019

Edward Lotherington Colebrooke (29 October 1858 – 10 August 1939) was an English first-class cricketer.

The son of Dr. Henry Colebrooke, he was born at Southborough in October 1858. He was educated at Charterhouse School, before going up to Exeter College, Oxford. While at Oxford, he made his debut in first-class cricket for the Gentlemen of England against Oxford University in 1879 at Oxford. The following season he played first-class cricket for Oxford University, making five appearances and gaining a blue. He made an additional first-class appearance in 1880 when he played for the Gentlemen of Kent against the Gentlemen of England at Canterbury. In seven first-class matches, Colebrook scored 161 runs at an average of 13.41, with a high score of 34 not out. After graduating from Oxford, he became a priest in the Church of England. He died without issue at Canterbury in August 1939. His nephews Kenneth Hutchings, Frederick Hutchings and William Hutchings all played first-class cricket, with Kenneth playing at Test level for England.
