= Eric Hatfeild =

English cricketer

Personal information
- Full name: Charles Eric Hatfeild
- Born: 11 March 1887; Hartsdown, Margate, Kent
- Died: 21 September 1918 (aged 31); Cambrai, France
- Batting: Left-handed
- Bowling: Slow left-arm orthodox

Domestic team information
- Years: Team
- 1907–1909: Oxford University
- 1910–1914: Kent
- FC debut: 23 May 1907 Oxford University v Worcestershire
- Last FC: 13 July 1914 Kent v Essex

Career statistics
Competition	First-class
Matches	65
Runs scored	1,498
Batting average	16.10
100s/50s	0/8
Top score	74
Balls bowled	2,906
Wickets	64
Bowling average	23.04
5 wickets in innings	2
10 wickets in match	0
Best bowling	5/48
Catches/stumpings	45/–
- Source: CricInfo, 30 April 2016

Charles Eric Hatfeild MC (11 March 1887 – 21 September 1918) was an English cricketer who played first-class cricket for Oxford University and Kent County Cricket Club in the years before the First World War. Hatfeild was an officer in the Royal East Kent Yeomanry and the East Kent Regiment. He was decorated for gallantry during the war and was killed in action in September 1918 at Cambrai on the Western Front.

== Early life and education ==
Hatfeild was born at Hartsdown House near Margate in Kent in 1887, the son of a captain in the 1st King's Dragoon Guards and JP in a prominent local family. He was the eldest child, having three brothers and three sisters. He was educated locally at Wellington House School at Westgate-on-Sea and later at Eton College where he played in the school's cricket First XI in from 1903 to 1906, captaining the team, which included Herbert, in his final year. He was a very promising bowler at school, taking 12 wickets against Harrow School in a match at Lord's in 1903 but later developed as more of a batsman. He went to New College, Oxford, and played for Oxford University Cricket Club in 15 first-class cricket matches, gaining a cricket Blue in 1908.

After graduating from university Hatfeild attended Wye Agricultural College in 1910–11.

== Cricket career ==
Hatfeild made his debut for Kent in June 1910 in a County Championship match against Derbyshire at the County Ground, Derby. He played only two matches in 1910 as Kent won the County Championship, before gaining a more regular place in the Kent team in the following seasons. He was described in his Wisden obituary as an "enthusiastic cricketer" who played "whenever he was wanted", making 15 appearances in 1912 and 12 in 1913 as Kent won the last of their four Championship titles of the years before the First World War. In total he made 45 appearances for the county as an all-rounder at a time when Kent were one of the dominant first-class counties and had a good supply of excellent players and, as a prominent and well-connected amateur, was considered a candidate to succeed Ted Dillon as captain of the team when he resigned after the 1913 season. He was elected a member of the Kent Committee in 1913.

He toured Argentina with MCC in 1911–12 alongside his Kent colleague Lionel Troughton. He played in all three first-class matches on the tour, the first first-class matches played by the Argentina national cricket team, taking 16 first-class wickets on the tour including his best first-class bowling figures of five wickets for 48 runs. He also toured the US with Incogniti in 1913.

Hatfeild made his final first-class appearance in July 1914 against Essex at Tunbridge Wells just before he was mobilised after the start of the First World War.

== Military career and death ==
Hatfeild was commissioned as a Second Lieutenant in the Royal East Kent Yeomanry in 1913 and later transferred to the East Kent Regiment, serving in the 10th battalion. He was mobilised immediately after the outbreak of war in 1914 and served throughout the First World War, seeing action in the Gallipoli campaign, Egypt, Palestine and on the Western Front in France. He rose to the rank of Captain and commanded a company. Hatfeild was killed in action on 21 September 1918 fighting near Cambrai in northern France during the Hundred Days Offensive. He was posthumously awarded the Military Cross for the "conspicuous gallantry" he had shown three days before his death leading his company in an attack at Templeux-le-Guérard during the offensive.
