= Edward Colebrooke =

Edward Colebrooke may refer to:

- Edward Colebrooke, 1st Baron Colebrooke (1861–1939), British Liberal politician and courtier
- Sir Edward Colebrooke, 4th Baronet (1813–1890), British politician
- Edward Colebrooke (cricketer), English cricketer
