= Charles Hooman =

English cricketer

Personal information
- Full name: Charles Victor Lisle Hooman
- Born: 3 October 1887; Ditton, Kent, England
- Died: 20 November 1969 (aged 82); Palm Springs, Florida, United States
- Nickname: Chubby
- Batting: Right-handed
- Bowling: Right-arm medium
- Relatives: Thomas Hooman (father)

Domestic team information
- Years: Team
- 1906–1909: Devon
- 1907–1910: Oxford University
- 1910: Kent
- FC debut: 23 May 1907 Oxford University v Worcestershire
- Last FC: 12 September 1910 Kent v The Rest

Career statistics
| Competition | First-class |
|---|---|
| Matches | 38 |
| Runs scored | 1,758 |
| Batting average | 28.35 |
| 100s/50s | 3/9 |
| Top score | 117 |
| Balls bowled | 90 |
| Wickets | 0 |
| Bowling average | – |
| 5 wickets in innings | – |
| 10 wickets in match | – |
| Best bowling | – |
| Catches/stumpings | 33/– |
- Source: CricInfo, 12 November 2017

Charles Victor Lisle Hooman (3 October 1887 – 20 November 1969), often known as Chubby Holman, was an English amateur sportsman who played cricket for Oxford University and Kent County Cricket Club between 1907 and 1910. He won Blues for golf, rackets and cricket and later represented the Great Britain and Ireland golf team in the Walker Cup in 1922 and 1923. He served in the Royal Naval Reserve during World War I and the RAF Volunteer Reserve during World War II.

== Early life and education ==
Hooman was born at Ditton, Kent in 1887, the only son of Thomas and Louisa Hooman. His father had been a shipbroker and manufacturer of Portland cement and had played football for Wanderers, appearing in the 1872 FA Cup Final, and England. The family moved to Torquay and he was educated at Charterhouse School from 1901 where he played in the Cricket XI from 1903 to 1906, captaining the team in his final year, and won the Rackets Pairs competition at the Public Schools Championships in 1906.

He went on to Brasenose College, Oxford in 1906 to study Law. He played rackets, golf and cricket for the University winning Blues in all three. He was Captain of the university golf club in 1909 and President in 1910 and played for England against Scotland in 1910 and won the 1907 University Rackets Pairs with Geoffrey Foster.

== Sporting career ==
Hooman played cricket for Devon County Cricket Club in the Minor Counties Championship between 1906 and 1909 and made his first-class cricket debut in May 1907 for Oxford University Cricket Club against Worcestershire at the University Parks. He played for the University against the touring South Africans later the same season, but played no cricket in 1908 before appearing regularly in 1909 and 1910, including playing in the University Match in both seasons and topping batting averages for the University. He played for the Gentlemen again the Players in 1910 and, after completing university, for Kent County Cricket Club during remainder of the 1910 season. Kent won the County Championship for the second successive year and Hooman scored 1,070 runs in all first-class matches during the season, including 567 for Kent. He was awarded his county cap but did not play first-class cricket after the end of the 1910 season due to the pressure of his career.

He played in a total of 38 first-class matches, including 21 for the University and 15 for Kent. He played for MCC against Yorkshire at the end of the 1910 season and made his final first-class appearance for Kent in the Champion County match later the same month. Hooman was described as "really outstanding cricketer" and, in his obituary, as a "splendid batsman". He scored a total of 1,758 runs and made three first-class centuries with a high score of 117.

After giving up cricket, Hooman continued to play golf regularly. He played for the British and Ireland team in the inaugural Walker Cup in 1922 and in 1923. He also represented England in their annual match against Scotland in 1910 and 1922. He was described as a strong driver of the ball and Bernard Darwin, writing ahead of the 1922 competition considered that "when he is at his best there is no more dangerous or more brilliant player". During his 1922 Walker Cup singles match he was level with Jess Sweetser after 36 holes and the pair, with no instructions as to how to resolve the match, played an extra hole to decide the winner. Hooman won the match, but this is the only time in Walker Cup history that an extra hole has been played – drawn matches are awarded no points. He was eventually forced to stop playing golf after suffering from health issues in his legs.

== Military service ==
After the start of World War I Hooman volunteered for the Royal Naval Reserve in February 1915. He served on HMS Stephen Furness, a merchant armed boarding steamer in the auxiliary fleet employed to board ships to enforce the trade blockade of Germany, as Assistant Paymaster. In 1916 he transferred to HMS Thalia, an ex-troop ship being used as a shore base on the Cromarty Firth, before serving as Assistant Paymaster on the armed yacht Eileen operating patrols out of Bermuda until 1919 when he ended his service as acting lieutenant and was awarded the Victory Medal and British War Medal.

During World War II he volunteered for the RAF Volunteer Reserve as a Pilot Officer. He was promoted to Flight lieutenant and then Squadron leader before resigning his commission in 1944, aged 57.

== Personal life ==
Hooman was married three times. His first wife, Adelaide Porcelli-Cust whom he married in 1912, died in 1925 and he married again in 1930 to Evelyn Margaret Gavin (née Ryder). She died in 1947 and he married his third wife, Alice Jarrett.

Hooman died in a nursing home at Palm Beach, Florida in 1969 aged 82. The death notice for him in The Times refers to him as Charles Victor Lisle ("Chubby") Hooman, a nickname he had acquired at school and was used throughout his golfing career.
