= David Jennings (cricketer) =

English cricketer

Personal information
- Full name: David William Jennings
- Born: 4 June 1889; Kentish Town, London
- Died: 6 August 1918 (aged 29); Tunbridge Wells, Kent
- Batting: Right-handed
- Role: Batsman
- Relatives: George Jennings (brother); Tom Jennings (brother); Leonard Jennings (brother)

Domestic team information
- Years: Team
- 1909–1914: Kent
- FC debut: 16 August 1909 Kent v Surrey
- Last FC: 20 August 1914 Kent v Worcestershire

Career statistics
Competition	First-class
Matches	35
Runs scored	1,064
Batting average	24.18
100s/50s	3/4
Top score	106
Balls bowled	95
Wickets	1
Bowling average	80.00
5 wickets in innings	0
10 wickets in match	0
Best bowling	1/13
Catches/stumpings	28/–
- Source: CricInfo, 23 April 2016

David William Jennings (4 June 1889 – 6 August 1918) was an English cricketer who played first-class cricket for Kent County Cricket Club in the years before the First World War. Primarily a batsman, Jennings played for Kent when they won the County Championship in 1909, 1910, and 1913.

Jennings served in the Kent Fortress Royal Engineers in the First World War and died as a result of injuries received during his service in August 1918.

== Early life ==
Jennings was born at Kentish Town, then part of Middlesex, in 1889. His parents were David and Isabella Jennings. By 1908 he was employed as the professional cricketer at The Mote in Maidstone when he was taken on to the staff at Kent.

== Cricket career ==
Jennings made his first-class cricket debut for Kent in August 1909 in a County Championship match against Surrey at The Oval. This was his only appearance in the Kent's 1909 team.

In 1911 he led the Kent batting averages, was awarded his county cap and scored his first century in first-class cricket, although he only played in three matches. Seven appearances in 1912 saw him second in the county's averages and he scored another century against Hampshire. He played 11 matches for Kent in both 1913, when they won the County Championship, and in 1914. He made his highest score, 106 not out, in 1914 against Essex at Tunbridge Wells. In total Jennings played 35 times for Kent and had a batting average of 24.18. He played his final match in August 1914 against Worcestershire at the St Lawrence Ground in Canterbury.

== Military service and death ==
Jennings joined the Kent Fortress Royal Engineers during the First World War, enlisting as a private in 1914 and reaching the rank of Second Corporal. He served in the same unit as his Kent teammate Colin Blythe and played alongside Blythe in two matches organised during the war against Australian and South African Imperial Forces at Lord's in 1917.

In May 1917 Jennings was transferred to the Royal Engineers for active service and posted to France in 1918. He was with 206 Field Company, RE near Bienvillers-au-Bois south-west of Arras when he was gassed in April and suffered from shell shock. He was invalided back to England and died of his injuries at Tunbridge Wells in August 1918 aged 29.

== Family ==
Jennings was part of a family with a number of cricketers in it. His father, also David Jennings, played for Devon in the Minor Counties Championship and was later the professional coach and head groundsman at Marlborough College, whilst his younger brothers George and Tom both played first-class cricket after World War I, George for Warwickshire and Tom for Surrey. Both also played for Devon. Another brother Leonard played two first-class matches for the Royal Air Force while yet another, Stanley, played one match for Wiltshire in the Minor Counties Championship.

== Bibliography ==
- Carlaw, Derek (2020). Kent County Cricketers, A to Z: Part One (1806–1914) (PDF). Cardiff: ACS.
