= Ted Dillon =

English sportsman (1881–1941)

Personal information
- Full name: Edward Wentworth Dillon
- Born: 15 February 1881; Penge, Kent
- Died: 20 April 1941 (aged 60); Totteridge, Hertfordshire
- Batting: Left-handed
- Bowling: Right-arm leg break

Domestic team information
- Years: Team
- 1900: London County
- 1900–1923: Kent
- 1901–1902: Oxford University

Career statistics
Competition	First-class
Matches	260
Runs scored	11,006
Batting average	28.29
100s/50s	15/51
Top score	143
Balls bowled	2,426
Wickets	74
Bowling average	32.78
5 wickets in innings	0
10 wickets in match	0
Best bowling	4/11
Catches/stumpings	213/–
- Source: Cricinfo, 21 March 2016

Edward Wentworth Dillon (15 February 1881 – 20 April 1941) was an English amateur sportsman in the early years of the 20th century. He played over 200 first-class cricket matches, mainly for Kent County Cricket Club between 1900 and 1913. Dillon captained Kent to three County Championship victories between 1909 and 1913, the only captain in the club history to lead the county to multiple championship titles. He also played rugby union for Blackheath and represented England in four international matches.

== Early life and education ==
Dillon was born at Penge in what was then Kent, the fourth child of a shipbroker. He was educated at Abbey School, Beckenham and at Rugby School, where he topped the school batting averages in 1899 and 1900 and was described by Wisden as the best school batsman of the year. He earned his cricket Blue in his first year at Oxford University, appearing for both the University, whom he captained, and for Kent during his time as a student. Dillon also played rugby union for both Rugby and Oxford.

== Cricket career ==
Dillon made his first-class cricket debut for London County Cricket Club in August 1900, making his Kent first-class debut later in the same month. He was predominantly a batsman, often opening the batting. Wisden described him as "very free in style" and being powerful when driving the ball. In his first-class career he scored over 10,000 runs, the majority for Kent. In 1905 and 1906 he averaged more than 40, making his highest score of 141 against Gloucestershire in 1905. He bowled leg-breaks occasionally, taking 74 first-class wickets.

Dillon captained Kent between 1909 and 1913 during which time the County won the County Championship in 1909, 1910 and 1913. He is the only Kent captain to have led the county to win the championship more than once. As an amateur his playing time was restricted by his business commitments as a shipbroker at times, including in 1909 when former club captain Jack Mason captained the Kent team in the final month of the season in Dillon's absence. He toured the West Indies with RA Bennett's XI in 1902 and America with Kent in 1903.

After World War I Dillon played in four first-class matches, including two in the County Championship for Kent in 1919. He made his final appearance for Kent in 1923 in another Championship match.

After Dillon's death in 1941, The Times cricket correspondent wrote:

Dillon ... was one of the most distinguished and reliable members of a great band of cricketers who early in this century made the Kent team not only one of the most successful but certainly the most attractive in the country.

== Rugby union career ==
Dillon was a fine rugby union player, playing as a centre for Oxford University and Blackheath. He won four international caps for England, playing against Wales, Scotland and Ireland in the 1904 Home Nations Championship and against Wales in the 1905 Championship. He also represented Harlequins, Barbarians and Kent.

== Military career and later life ==
Dillon enlisted in September 1914, being commissioned into the Royal West Kent Regiment in the early months of World War I, eventually reaching the rank of captain and serving as a company commander in the 2/4th battalion. He served during the war at Gallipoli, in the Senussi campaign in Egypt and in Palestine, where he took part in the First Battle of Gaza. Dillon was wounded during the Stalemate in Southern Palestine and was involved in the Southern Palestine Offensive and the Battle of Jerusalem in late 1917. He was transferred to the Economic Division in Cairo in late December 1917, serving there in the Intelligence Corps for the remainder of the war.

Dillon died in 1941 aged 60 at Totteridge in Hertfordshire.

Sporting positions
Preceded by C. H. B. Marsham	Kent County Cricket Club captain 1909–1913	Succeeded by Lionel Troughton
