= Tom Jennings (cricketer) =

English cricketer (1896–1972)

Thomas Jennings
Personal information
- Full name: Thomas Shepherd Jennings
- Born: 3 November 1896; Tiverton, Devon
- Died: 7 September 1972 (aged 75); Tiverton, Devon
- Batting: Left-handed
- Bowling: Slow left-arm orthodox
- Relatives: David Jennings (brother); George Jennings (brother); Leonard Jennings (brother)

Domestic team information
- Years: Team
- 1921–1924: Surrey
- 1926–1933: Devon

Career statistics
Competition	First-class
Matches	18
Runs scored	194
Batting average	13.85
100s/50s	0/0
Top score	37*
Balls bowled	2,393
Wickets	37
Bowling average	29.56
5 wickets in innings	3
10 wickets in match	1
Best bowling	6/51
Catches/stumpings	4/–
- Source: Cricinfo, 16 April 2011

Thomas Shepherd Jennings (3 November 1896 – 7 September 1972) was an English cricketer. Jennings was a left-handed batsman who bowled slow left-arm orthodox. He was born in Tiverton, Devon.

Jennings made his first-class debut for Surrey in the 1921 County Championship against Essex. Jennings played first-class cricket for Surrey from 1921 to 1924, playing 18 times for them. In these 18 matches, he scored 194 runs at a batting average of 13.85, with a high score of 37*. Predominantly a bowler, Jennings took 37 wickets for Surrey at a bowling average of 29.56, with three five wicket hauls and once taking ten wickets in a match, which came against Derbyshire in 1924. He claimed 6 wickets in the Derbyshire first-innings and took 4 in their second. The pitches at The Oval in the early to mid-twenties were not friendly to Jennings style of bowling, thus he wasn't a regular feature in the Surrey team.

Following the end of his first-class career, Jennings played Minor counties cricket for Devon, having previously represented the Surrey Second XI in the Minor Counties Championship. His debut for Devon came against the Surrey Second XI in 1926, with Jennings playing Devon from 1926 to 1933. Starting in 1935, Jennings began umpiring in the Minor Counties Championship, standing in 87 matches between 1935 and 1962. He stood in just the one first-class match, held in 1953 between a combined Minor Counties team and the touring Australians at the Michelin Ground, Stoke-on-Trent.

Part of a large cricketing family, his brothers David, George and Leonard all played first-class cricket. Following his move back to Devon from, he became the head groundsman at Blundell's School in his home town. It was here that Jennings died on 7 September 1972.
