= George Jennings (cricketer) =

English cricketer

Personal information
- Full name: George Adolphus Jennings
- Born: 14 January 1895; Tiverton, Devon
- Died: 12 July 1959 (aged 64); Marlborough, Wiltshire
- Batting: Right-handed
- Bowling: Slow left-arm orthodox
- Relatives: David Jennings (brother); Tom Jennings (brother); Leonard Jennings (brother)

Domestic team information
- Years: Team
- 1923–1925: Warwickshire
- 1925–1927: Devon

Career statistics
| Competition | First-class |
|---|---|
| Matches | 20 |
| Runs scored | 243 |
| Batting average | 11.04 |
| 100s/50s | 0/0 |
| Top score | 41 |
| Balls bowled | 1,912 |
| Wickets | 23 |
| Bowling average | 39.82 |
| 5 wickets in innings | 1 |
| 10 wickets in match | 0 |
| Best bowling | 5/92 |
| Catches/stumpings | 8/– |
- Source: Cricinfo, 16 April 2011

George Adolphus Jennings (14 January 1895 – 12 July 1959) was an English cricketer. Jennings was a right-handed batsman who bowled slow left-arm orthodox. He was born in Tiverton, Devon.

Jennings made his first-class debut for Warwickshire in 1923 against the touring West Indians. Jennings played first-class cricket for Warwickshire from 1923 to 1925, playing 20 times for them. In these 20 matches, he scored 243 runs at a batting average of 11.04, with a high score of 41. Predominantly a bowler, Jennings took 23 wickets for Warwickshire at a bowling average of 39.82, with a single five wicket haul, which came against the touring South Africans in 1924. He claimed 5/92 in their first-innings.

Following the end of his first-class career, Jennings played Minor counties cricket for Devon, making his debut for Devon came against the Surrey Second XI in 1925, with Jennings playing for Devon from 1925 to 1927.

Part of a large cricketing family, his brothers David, Tom and Leonard all played first-class cricket. He later succeeded his father as cricket coach at Marlborough College, a position he held for more than thirty years. It was in Marlborough, Wiltshire that he died on 12 July 1959.
