= 1910 County Championship =

English cricket tournament

- Cricket format: First-class cricket (3 days)
- Tournament format: League system
- Champions: Kent (3rd title)
- Participants: 16
- Matches: 182
- Most runs: Johnny Tyldesley (1,961 for Lancashire)
- Most wickets: Razor Smith (215 for Surrey)

The 1910 County Championship was the 21st officially organised running of the County Championship, and ran from 2 May to 1 September 1910. Kent County Cricket Club won their third championship title, their second title in successive seasons. Somerset finished bottom of the table, failing to win a match all season.

== Table ==
Team	Pld	W	L	D	A	Pts	%PC
Kent	26	19	3	3	1	19	76.000
Surrey	30	16	7	5	2	16	57.143
Middlesex	22	11	5	6	0	11	50.000
Lancashire	30	14	5	10	1	14	48.276
Nottinghamshire	20	9	4	7	0	9	45.000
Hampshire	24	10	10	4	0	10	41.667
Sussex	26	10	9	6	1	10	40.000
Yorkshire	28	10	7	10	1	10	37.037
Northamptonshire	20	7	8	4	1	7	36.842
Leicestershire	18	6	11	0	1	6	35.294
Essex	18	5	8	4	1	5	29.412
Gloucestershire	20	5	11	4	0	5	25.000
Worcestershire	22	5	8	9	0	5	22.727
Warwickshire	20	4	8	7	1	4	21.053
Derbyshire	22	2	14	4	2	2	10.000
Somerset	18	0	15	3	0	0	0.000
Source: CricketArchive

- One point was awarded for a win. Final placings were decided by dividing the number of points earned by the number of completed matches (i.e. those that ended in a win, loss or draw), and multiplying by 100.

== Statistics ==
Most runs, 1910 County Championship
Aggregate	Average	Player	County
1,961	49.02	Johnny Tyldesley	Lancashire
1,511	38.74	Alfred Hartley	Lancashire
1,483	38.02	Punter Humphreys	Kent
1,457	39.37	James Seymour	Kent
1,432	31.13	Jack Hobbs	Surrey
Source: CricketArchive

Most wickets, 1910 County Championship
Aggregate	Average	Player	County
215	12.56	Razor Smith	Surrey
156	18.45	Jack Newman	Hampshire
149	13.77	Charlie Blythe	Kent
134	15.05	George Hirst	Yorkshire
133	15.22	Harry Dean	Lancashire
Source: CricketArchive

== See also ==
- 1910 English cricket season
- Derbyshire County Cricket Club in 1910
- Kent County Cricket Club in 1910
