= Leonard Frank Jennings =

English cricketer and Royal Air Force officer

Personal information
- Full name: Leonard Frank Jennings
- Born: 5 November 1903; Marlborough, Wiltshire, England
- Died: 28 March 1977 (aged 73); Battle, Sussex, England
- Batting: Unknown
- Bowling: Unknown
- Relatives: David Jennings (brother); George Jennings (brother); Tom Jennings (brother)

Career statistics
Competition	First-class
Matches	2
Runs scored	55
Batting average	27.50
100s/50s	–/–
Top score	45*
Balls bowled	30
Wickets	0
Bowling average	–
5 wickets in innings	–
10 wickets in match	–
Best bowling	–
Catches/stumpings	1/–
- Source: Cricinfo, 20 March 2019

Leonard Frank Jennings OBE (5 November 1903 – 28 March 1977) was an English first-class cricketer and Royal Air Force officer. He served in the Royal Air Force as both a non-commissioned officer and a commissioned officer for approximately twenty-five years, as well as playing first-class cricket for the Royal Air Force cricket team.

== Life and military career ==
Jennings was the son of David Jennings, who played for Devon in the Minor Counties Championship. David Jennings was later the professional coach and head groundsman at Marlborough College. He played first-class cricket for the Royal Air Force cricket team in 1929, playing against the Royal Navy at Chatham. He made a second first-class appearance against the British Army cricket team in 1931 at The Oval. Across his two first-class matches, Jennings scored 55 runs with a high score of 45 not out.

Having served in the Royal Air Force as a non-commissioned officer since at least 1929, Jennings was commissioned as a flying officer on probation in April 1940, to last for the duration of the Second World War. He was confirmed in the rank in May 1941, and was promoted to the temporary rank of flight lieutenant in January 1943, with confirmation in the rank in September 1947. Jennings was mentioned in dispatches in June 1945. By 1952, he was an acting wing commander, with him being made an OBE in the 1952 Birthday Honours. He was promoted to the rank of squadron leader in May 1954, as well as retiring. While on the Reserve of Officers list, he was promoted to the full rank of wing commander in January 1957.

He died in March 1977 at Battle, Sussex. His brothers, David, George and Tom, all played first-class cricket.
