= Charles Mason (cricketer) =

English cricketer and solicitor (1871–1945)

Personal information
- Full name: Charles Eagleton Stuart Mason
- Born: 6 June 1871; Woolwich, Kent, England
- Died: 19 April 1945 (aged 73); Kidbrooke, Kent, England
- Batting: Unknown
- Relatives: Jack Mason (brother); James Mason (brother)

Domestic team information
- Years: Team
- 1896: Marylebone Cricket Club

Career statistics
Competition	First-class
Matches	1
Runs scored	8
Batting average	4.00
100s/50s	–/–
Top score	8
Catches/stumpings	–/–
- Source: Cricinfo, 10 October 2021

Charles Eagleton Stuart Mason (6 June 1871 — 19 April 1945) was an English first-class cricketer and solicitor.

The son of Richard Smith Mason, he was born in June 1871 at Blackheath and was educated at Winchester College. After completing his education he became a solicitor, practicing at High Holborn. Mason made a single appearance in first-class cricket for the Marylebone Cricket Club (MCC) against Essex at Lord's in 1896. He batted once in the match, ending the MCC's first innings unbeaten on 2 runs. Batting twice in the match, he was dismissed for 8 runs in the MCC first innings by Walter Mead, while following-on in their second innings he was dismissed for without scoring by Harry Pickett. His interest in cricket included as a writer, with Mason the book Winchester College Public School Cricket Matches in 1891, with him writing a second volume in 1893. In 1899 he was appointed a Commissioner for Oaths. A freemason, he was Master of The Earl Of Dartmouth Lodge in London in 1917–18. Mason died at Kidbrooke in April 1945. His brothers, Jack and James, were both cricketers, with Jack playing Test cricket. Three other brothers were also "devoted to the game", all playing for Beckenham Cricket Club.
