= Harold Prest =

English cricketer (1890–1955)

Personal information
- Full name: Harold Edward Westray Prest
- Born: 9 January 1890; Beckenham, Kent
- Died: 5 January 1955 (aged 64); Chinthurst, Shalford, Surrey
- Batting: Right-handed

Domestic team information
- Years: Team
- 1909–1911: Cambridge University
- 1909–1922: Kent

Career statistics
Competition	First-class
Matches	32
Runs scored	1,156
Batting average	28.19
100s/50s	1/8
Top score	133*
Balls bowled	5
Wickets	1
Bowling average	4.00
5 wickets in innings	0
10 wickets in match	0
Best bowling	1/4
Catches/stumpings	22/–
- Source: CricInfo, 21 April 2016

Harold Edward Westray Prest (9 January 1890 – 5 January 1955) was an English amateur cricketer who played first-class cricket for Kent County Cricket Club before and after the First World War.

== Early life ==
Prest was born in Beckenham in what was then part of Kent, the son of Stanley and Emily Priest. His father was a director of an engineering company and Prest was educated at Abbey School in Beckenham before going on to Malvern College where he played in the school First XI for three years, making a high score of 174 not out in 1908 as he headed the Malvern batting averages. He was considered by Wisden as a fine, aggressive schoolboy batsman with "excellent style", as well as a good fielder and played for the public schools team against Marylebone Cricket Club (MCC) at Lord's.

He went on to Pembroke College, Cambridge and played for Cambridge University 12 times, appearing in Varsity matches in 1909 and 1911. As well as cricket, Prest also won Blues in football and golf.

== Cricket career ==
Prest made his debut for Kent in 1909 whilst in his first year at Cambridge, playing four times for the county during the season and being awarded his county cap as Kent won the 1909 County Championship. He did not play any first-class cricket in 1910 due to injury, resuming his career in 1911, playing 19 matches in total during the season, by far his most productive. He played ten times for Kent and nine times for Cambridge during the season and made a total of 747 runs, including his only first-class century, a score of 133 not out for Kent against Somerset.

Prest played a total of 19 matches for Kent during his career, playing only a handful of games in 1912 before appearing in two County Championship matches in 1922. He played club cricket for Beckenham, Old Malvernians and Yellowhammers.

== Military service ==
Prest joined the Royal Berkshire Regiment at the start of World War I and had been commissioned as a 2nd lieutenant by the end of 1914. Trained in the use of machine guns, he initially served with the 3rd battalion on the home front and was promoted to lieutenant, but was posted to the 2nd battalion in France in May 1916. His unit took part in the Battle of the Somme later in the year, although Prest was part of a small group of men kept out of the initial attack in order to provide a nucleus around which to rebuild the battalion.

Loses amongst other officers meant that Prest was promoted to acting captain and given command of a company towards the end of 1916. He saw front line action at Bouchavesnes in March 1917, repulsing a German counter-attack and was mentioned in dispatches and awarded the Croix de Guerre.

Later in 1917, he was posted as Chief Instructor in a machine gun school and in 1918 commanded a Lewis gun and mortar school, promoted to acting major. He was demobilised in February 1919, retaining the rank of major.

At the start of World War II he rejoined the army, serving as a lieutenant with a home defence battalion of the Royal Norfolk Regiment. Ill health led to him leaving service in October 1941.

== Later life ==
Prest married Alice Lauriston in 1944. He was a keen golfer and played for Seaford, the Oxford and Cambridge Society and the Royal Worlington and Newmarket clubs. He died at Chinthurst near Shalford, Surrey in 1955 aged 64.

== Bibliography ==
- Carlaw, Derek (2020). Kent County Cricketers, A to Z: Part One (1806–1914) (PDF). Cardiff: ACS.
