= Francis Huish =

English cricketer

Personal information
- Full name: Francis Edward Huish
- Born: 9 December 1867; Clapham, Surrey
- Died: 8 December 1955 (aged 87); Los Angeles, California
- Batting: Left-handed
- Bowling: Left arm medium
- Relatives: Fred Huish (brother)

Domestic team information
- Years: Team
- 1895: Kent

Career statistics
Competition	First-class
Matches	5
Runs scored	32
Batting average	8.00
100s/50s	0/0
Top score	12
Balls bowled	745 (Note: CricInfo and CricketArchive disagree as to the number of deliveries bowled by Huish. Given that 5-ball overs were standard in England in 1895, the CricketArchive figure of 747 deliveries matches the scorecard data on the same website. The CricInfo data would approximately match if 4 ball overs were standard. The CricketArchive data has been used for deliveries here.)
Wickets	11
Bowling average	39.36
5 wickets in innings	1
10 wickets in match	0
Best bowling	5/52
Catches/stumpings	3/–
- Source: CricInfo, 30 August 2016

Francis Edward Huish (9 December 1867 – 8 December 1955) was an English cricketer who played first-class cricket for Kent County Cricket Club during the 1895 English cricket season. He was born in Clapham in what was then Surrey in 1867 and died in Los Angeles, California in 1955.

Huish played as a bowler who appeared in five first-class matches. He made his first-class debut for Kent at Maidstone against Oxford University in June 1895 before going on to play in four County Championship matches for the county during July. His final first-class appearance was against Surrey at Catford.

Huish played one minor match for Surrey in the 1888 season before appearing for Surrey Second XI and Surrey Club and Ground between 1889 and 1891. He appeared twice for the Players of Kent in 1892 before playing in four matches for the Kent Second XI between 1894 and 1896.

Huish's younger brother, Fred Huish, also made his first-class debut for Kent in June 1895 before going on to make over 450 first-class appearances for the county, making his final appearance in 1914. He is regarded as "one of the ablest and least demonstrative wicket-keepers of his generation" and remains the record holder for most dismissals in a career for Kent.

Huish emigrated to America in 1910 with his wife Ella. He became a naturalised US citizen in Pennsylvania in 1922.

== Bibliography ==
- Carlaw, Derek (2020). Kent County Cricketers, A to Z: Part One (1806–1914) (PDF). Cardiff: ACS.
