= Claude Lewis =

English cricketer

Personal information
- Born: 27 July 1908; Sittingbourne, Kent
- Died: 27 April 1993 (aged 84); Borstal, Rochester, Kent
- Batting: Left-handed
- Bowling: Slow left-arm orthodox
- Role: Bowler

Domestic team information
- Years: Team
- 1933–1953: Kent
- FC debut: 7 June 1933 Kent v Marylebone Cricket Club (MCC)
- Last FC: 8 August 1953 Kent v Leicestershire

Career statistics
Competition	First-class
Matches	128
Runs scored	738
Batting average	6.41
100s/50s	0/0
Top score	27
Balls bowled	18,333
Wickets	301
Bowling average	27.23
5 wickets in innings	14
10 wickets in match	4
Best bowling	8/58
Catches/stumpings	61/–
- Source: Cricinfo, 23 August 2020

Claude Lewis BEM (27 July 1908 – 27 April 1993) was an English cricketer. He played 128 first-class matches between 1933 and 1953, all of them for Kent County Cricket Club.

Lewis was born at Sittingbourne in Kent in 1908, the son of shipwright Bertie Lewis and his wife Kate (née Thurlow). The family also had a business restoring antique furniture. Lewis was educated at Borden Grammar School in the town, where he played cricket in the school XI. He was taken on to the playing staff at Kent in 1928 and made his debut for the Second XI the following season, playing against Devon in the Minor Counties Championship.

Primarily a bowler, Lewis made his First XI debut in 1933 and played 128 matches for the county between then and 1953. He played frequently until the 1946 season, although he was never a consistent first choice bowler, and in 1947 primarily became a coach, assisting Punter Humphreys. He took over from Humphreys in 1949, although he played occasional matches during the season and made a final First XI appearance in 1953. He took 301 wickets, with best bowling figures of eight wickets for the cost of 58 runs.

Lewis was awarded his county cap in 1933 and a benefit season in 1952. Even after becoming the team coach he played occasionally for the Second XI until 1957. He later served as the county's scorer, finally retiring in 1988. He was honoured with a second benefit season in 1978 and awarded the British Empire Medal in the 1989 New Year Honours for services to cricket.

Lewis died at Borstal near Rochester in 1993. He was aged 84.

== Bibliography ==
- Carlaw, Derek (2020). Kent County Cricketers, A to Z: Part Two (1919–1939) (PDF). Cardiff: ACS.
