= James Mason (cricketer) =

English cricketer (1876–1938)

Personal information
- Full name: James Ernest Mason
- Born: 29 October 1876; Blackheath, Kent
- Died: 8 February 1938 (aged 61); Wallington, Surrey
- Batting: Right-handed
- Relatives: Jack Mason (brother); Charles Mason (brother)

Domestic team information
- Years: Team
- 1900: Kent
- 1905: Berkshire

Career statistics
Competition	First-class
Matches	1
Runs scored	1
Batting average	1.00
100s/50s	0/0
Top score	1
Catches/stumpings	0/–
- Source: Cricinfo, 23 November 2011

James Ernest Mason OBE (29 October 1876 – 8 February 1938) was an English amateur cricketer who played one first-class cricket match for Kent County Cricket Club and later played once for Berkshire County Cricket Club. He served in the British army on the home front during World War I and rose to the rank of Lieutenant-colonel. In civilian life he worked as a solicitor.

== Early life ==
Mason was born in Blackheath, then part of the county of Kent, one of seven brothers and three sisters. His father, Richard, had played for Worcestershire before the county gained first-class cricket status and worked as a solicitor. His mother, Ann, was the daughter of John Eagleton. His brother Jack played five Test matches for England, captained Kent between 1892 and 1902 and was one of Wisden's five Cricketers of the Year in 1898. Another brother, Charles, both played one first-class cricket match for MCC and three other brothers were also "devoted to the game", all playing for Beckenham Cricket Club.

Mason was educated at Abbey School in Beckenham and then at Tonbridge School where he showed promise as a batsman. On leaving school he began training to become a solicitor.

== Cricket ==
Mason played five times for Kent Second XI between 1897 and 1899 before making his only first-class appearance for the county First XI against Yorkshire at Headingley in the 1900 County Championship. He later played for Berkshire County Cricket Club in the Minor Counties Championship, making a single appearance in 1905 against Monmouthshire.

== Military service ==
At the start of World War I Mason, aged 38, volunteered for the Royal Naval Volunteer Reserve (RNVR). He was appointed as an Able Seaman and posted to an anti-aircraft unit. A number of his brothers were serving in the Army Service Corps (ASC) and, in March 1915, Mason applied to leave the RNVR and join the ASC, being commissioned as a lieutenant in June.

Mason served throughout the war on the home front and rose to the rank of Lieutenant-colonel. He was primarily employed organising forage for the army, serving as Chief Accountant for the Forage Committee in London and in Reading before ending the war as Area Administrative Officer of the Eastern region. He applied twice for transfers to active service in France but was denied both times, senior officers determining that his work with the Forage Committee was vital to the war effort.

After the end of the war Mason was awarded the OBE and mentioned in dispatches for his service. He was demobilised in April 1919, relinquishing his commission.

== Later life ==
Outside of cricket Mason worked as a solicitor, initially at Queen Street Chambers in Maidenhead. For a time he was in partnership with a William Weed, however the partnership was dissolved in July 1912 and he joined Amery-Parkes and Company in London as a legal partner. with four other solicitors. After his war service he rejoined the firm and was married in 1934 to Violet Armsden. He died at Wallington in Surrey in February 1938 aged 61.
