= 1909 County Championship =

English cricket tournament

- Cricket format: First-class cricket (3 days)
- Tournament format: League system
- Champions: Kent (2nd title)
- Participants: 16
- Most runs: Ernie Hayes (1,844 for Surrey)
- Most wickets: Colin Blythe (178 for Kent)

Location of the home ground of each county

The 1909 County Championship was the 20th officially organised running of the County Championship. The season ran from 3 May to 30 August 1909. Kent won their second championship title, while Lancashire finished in second place. The previous season's winners, Yorkshire, finished third.

== Table ==
| Team | P | W | L | D | A | Pts | Fin | %Fin |
|---|---|---|---|---|---|---|---|---|
| Kent | 26 | 16 | 2 | 8 | 0 | 14 | 18 | 77.77 |
| Lancashire | 24 | 14 | 4 | 6 | 0 | 10 | 18 | 55.55 |
| Yorkshire | 26 | 12 | 4 | 10 | 0 | 8 | 16 | 50.00 |
| Sussex | 26 | 7 | 3 | 16 | 0 | 4 | 10 | 40.00 |
| Surrey | 30 | 16 | 7 | 7 | 0 | 9 | 23 | 39.13 |
| Middlesex | 22 | 6 | 5 | 10 | 1 | 1 | 11 | 9.09 |
| Northamptonshire | 18 | 9 | 8 | 1 | 0 | 1 | 17 | 5.88 |
| Hampshire | 22 | 7 | 7 | 8 | 0 | 0 | 14 | 0.00 |
| Worcestershire | 20 | 8 | 8 | 4 | 0 | 0 | 16 | 0.00 |
| Nottinghamshire | 20 | 6 | 8 | 5 | 1 | –2 | 14 | –14.28 |
| Somerset | 16 | 4 | 7 | 5 | 0 | –3 | 11 | –27.27 |
| Warwickshire | 20 | 3 | 8 | 9 | 0 | –5 | 11 | –45.45 |
| Leicestershire | 22 | 3 | 10 | 8 | 1 | –7 | 13 | –53.84 |
| Essex | 20 | 2 | 7 | 9 | 2 | –5 | 9 | –55.55 |
| Derbyshire | 22 | 2 | 15 | 4 | 1 | –13 | 17 | –76.47 |
| Gloucestershire | 22 | 1 | 13 | 8 | 0 | –12 | 14 | –85.71 |

- One point was awarded for a win, and one point was taken away for each loss. Final placings were decided by dividing the number of points earned by the number of completed matches (i.e. those that ended in a win or a loss), and multiplying by 100.

== Statistics ==
=== Batting ===
Most runs
| Aggregate | Average | Player | County |
|---|---|---|---|
| 1,844 | 39.23 | Ernie Hayes | Surrey |
| 1,771 | 45.41 | Jack Hobbs | Surrey |
| 1,544 | 37.65 | David Denton | Yorkshire |
| 1,451 | 40.30 | Robert Relf | Sussex |
| 1,352 | 37.55 | Phil Mead | Hampshire |

=== Bowling ===
Most wickets
| Aggregate | Average | Player | County |
|---|---|---|---|
| 178 | 14.07 | Colin Blythe | Kent |
| 135 | 19.11 | George Dennett | Gloucestershire |
| 120 | 20.17 | Walter Lees | Surrey |
| 118 | 13.80 | George Thompson | Northamptonshire |
| 111 | 12.67 | Schofield Haigh | Yorkshire |

== See also ==
- 1909 English cricket season
- Derbyshire County Cricket Club in 1909
- Kent County Cricket Club in 1909
