= Henry Preston (cricketer) =

English cricketer (1883–1964)

Personal information
- Full name: Henry John Berridge Preston
- Born: 25 October 1883; Bareilly, North-Western Provinces, British India
- Died: 23 April 1964 (aged 80); Hastings, Sussex
- Batting: Right-handed
- Bowling: Right-arm medium

Domestic team information
- Years: Team
- 1907–1913: Kent
- FC debut: 27 June 1907 Kent v Essex
- Last FC: 9 June 1913 Kent v Worcestershire

Career statistics
Competition	First-class
Matches	19
Runs scored	84
Batting average	6.46
100s/50s	0/0
Top score	18
Balls bowled	2,081
Wickets	43
Bowling average	20.11
5 wickets in innings	1
10 wickets in match	0
Best bowling	5/23
Catches/stumpings	4/–
- Source: CricInfo, 20 April 2016

Henry John Berridge Preston (25 October 1883 – 23 April 1964), known also as Harry Preston, was an English professional cricketer who played for Kent County Cricket Club between 1907 and 1913. He also played in the Lancashire League, and in Scotland where he also coached, and represented Scotland. He was born in Bareilly in India in 1883 and died, aged 80, in Hastings in 1964.

== Cricket career ==
Preston made his debut for Kent in June 1907 against Essex at Leyton. Primarily a bowler, he played occasionally for Kent until 1913, never making more than seven appearances in a season, and made 19 first-class appearances in his career with the county. He was awarded his Kent cap in 1910 and played in the County Championship winning teams of 1909, 1910 and 1913.

He took a total of 43 wickets in his first-class career at an average of 20.11. His best figures were 5/23 achieved against Northamptonshire in June 1912, the only time he took five wickets in an innings in his first-class career. A tail-end batsman, Preston averaged only 6.46 with the bat. Preston made his final first-class appearance in June 1913 against Worcestershire and left Kent's staff at the end of the 1913 season.

Preston moved to Lancashire League club Nelson as their professional for the 1914 season, appearing in 22 matches. He took 88 wickets at an average of 11.72 to lead Nelson's bowling attack. At this time leagues such as the Lancashire League would often pay professionals more than first-class counties.

After World War I Preston played as a professional for the West of Scotland where he also coached. He represented Scotland twice, once in a Scotland XI in 1930 against the touring Australians and once, in a capped match, in 1936 against Sir Julien Cahn's XI. He took the wicket of the Australian captain Bill Woodfull in the first match and was described as doing "far better than his figures would appear to suggest" as he took 2/94.

After playing professionally, Preston became a groundsman at the Central Recreation Ground in Hastings. He played for Hastings and St Leonards Priory Cricket Club into his 60s and retired after an accident with a lawn mower which led to the loss of this right hand.

== Bibliography ==
- Carlaw, Derek (2020). Kent County Cricketers, A to Z: Part One (1806–1914) (PDF). Cardiff: ACS.
- Lewis, Paul (2014). For Kent and Country. Eastbourne: Reveille Press. ISBN 978-19-08336-63-7.
