= Frederick Hutchings =

English cricketer

Personal information
- Full name: Frederick Vaughan Hutchings
- Born: 3 June 1880; Southborough, Kent
- Died: 6 August 1934 (aged 54); Hamburg, Germany
- Batting: Right-handed
- Role: Batsman
- Relatives: Kenneth Hutchings (brother); William Hutchings (brother)

Domestic team information
- Years: Team
- 1901–1905: Kent

Career statistics
| Competition | First-class |
|---|---|
| Matches | 4 |
| Runs scored | 89 |
| Batting average | 14.83 |
| 100s/50s | 0/0 |
| Top score | 31 |
| Catches/stumpings | 0/– |
- Source: CricInfo, 17 November 2017

Frederick Vaughan Hutchings (3 June 1880 – 6 August 1934) was an English amateur cricketer who played in four first-class cricket matches in the early years of the 20th century. He served in the Army Service Corps in the First World War and was seriously injured.

== Early life ==
Hutchings was born at Southborough near Tunbridge Wells in Kent, the second son of Edward and Catherine Hutchings. His father was a surgeon and had been a keen cricketer. He was educated at Tonbridge School where he played in the cricket team as a right-handed opening batsman from 1896 to 1899 and represented the school at rackets at Queen's Club in 1898. He topped the school cricket averages in 1897 and scored a century against Oxford Authentics in the same season. He left the school in 1899 and worked as a stockbroker's clerk on the London Stock Exchange.

== Cricket career ==
After a single appearance for the Kent County Cricket Club Second XI in 1899, Hutchings made his first-class cricket debut for the county in May 1901 against MCC at Lord's. He played again against the touring South Africans later the same month but did not play again until a single appearance for the county in 1905. His final first-class match was for MCC against Yorkshire in August 1905. In his four first-class matches he made a total of 89 runs with a highest score of 31. He did not bowl.

== Military service ==
Hutchings volunteered for military service in September 1915. He was commissioned as a 2nd Lieutenant in October, serving in the Army Service Corps, initially at Grove Park with the Mechanical Transport Reserve Depot. He was attached to the Holt Caterpillar Section at Aldershot and then at the Avonmouth Tractor Depot. Hutchings was seriously injured in an accident at Aldershot in 1916 and in 1917 was stationed at Larkhill on Salisbury Plain when he was fit for light duties. He suffered a recurrence of haematuria later the same year and was found permanently unfit for service in April, leaving service with the rank of 2nd Lieutenant.

Hutchings was awarded the Silver War Badge and in 1918 was employed by the Admiralty at Woolwich Arsenal.

== Personal life and family ==
Hutchings married Maud Spens at Chelsea, London in May 1907. He was still working at the Stock Exchange at this time, but by the start of the war was supporting himself through private income and was the secretary of a golf course. His three brothers all went to Tonbridge and played in the cricket XI, with his oldest brother William and youngest brother Kenneth both playing first-class cricket for Kent – Kenneth also playing in seven Test matches for England. All four brothers served in the war, Kenneth being killed in action in 1916 and the others all injured.

Hutchings was sometimes known by his middle name Vaughan. He died suddenly at Hamburg in Germany in August 1934 aged 54.
