= William Hutchings =

English cricketer

Personal information
- Full name: William Edward Colebrooke Hutchings
- Born: 31 May 1879; Southborough, Kent
- Died: 8 March 1948 (aged 68); Prees, Shropshire
- Batting: Right-handed
- Role: Batsman
- Relatives: Frederick Hutchings (brother); Kenneth Hutchings (brother)

Domestic team information
- Years: Team
- 1899: Kent
- 1901: Berkshire
- 1905–1906: Worcestershire
- FC debut: 11 May 1899 Kent v Gloucestershire
- Last FC: 9 August 1906 Worcestershire v Somerset

Career statistics
Competition	First-class
Matches	24
Runs scored	845
Batting average	21.66
100s/50s	0/4
Top score	85
Catches/stumpings	20/–
- Source: CricInfo, 17 November 2017

William Edward Colebrooke Hutchings (31 May 1879 – 8 March 1948) was an English amateur cricketer who played in 24 first-class matches for Kent County Cricket Club and Worcestershire County Cricket Club at the turn of the twentieth century. He served in the Army Service Corps attached to the Royal Garrison Artillery during World War I in Egypt and on the Western Front where he was wounded.

== Early life ==
Hutchings was born at Southborough near Tunbridge Wells in Kent, the oldest son of Edward and Catherine Hutchings. His father was a surgeon and had been a keen cricketer. He was educated at Tonbridge School where he played in the cricket team between 1896 and 1898, captaining the team in his final year at school. He also represented the school at rackets at Queen's Club in 1898.

== Cricket career ==
Hutchings played in two County Championship matches for Kent County Cricket Club in 1899, making his first-class cricket debut against Gloucestershire at Blackheath in May before playing again against Nottinghamshire later the same week at Catford. He played in three Minor Counties Championship matches for Berkshire County Cricket Club in 1901 but did not reappear in first-class cricket until 1905.

In the 1905 season Hutchings played in ten matches for Worcestershire County Cricket Club, scoring three half-centuries with a highest score of 85 runs, made against Kent at Tunbridge Wells. He played twelve times the following season, but was less successful, averaging under 20 and passing fifty only once.

== Military service ==
Hutchings volunteered in August 1915 during the First World War. He joined the Army Service Corps, initially as a Private before being commissioned as a 2nd Lieutenant in September. He served at with the Motor Transport Depot at Grove Park, London, having given his occupation as chauffeur when he enlisted. He spent time at the Holt Caterpillar Section at Aldershot before returning to Grove Park and attached as Road Officer of the 36th Brigade of the Royal Garrison Artillery (RGA), responsible for organising the movement of large artillery pieces.

In 1916 he was posted to the 48th Siege Artillery in Egypt before being transferred to the Western Front in France where he served in the RGA during the Battle of the Somme and throughout 1917 with II Corps Headquarters and with First Army, being promoted to Lieutenant in August and temporary Captain in December. In January 1918 he was wounded in an artillery barrage, having previously suffered from bleeding ears which caused some deafness. He was invalided home and declared unfit for service, relinquishing his commission in July 1919.

== Personal life and family ==
Hutchings worked for United Brewery at Abingdon-on-Thames in Berkshire and had moved to The Wheatland brewery at Much Wenlock in Shropshire by 1905. He married Winifred Fitzsimmons in 1909. His three brothers all went to Tonbridge and played in the cricket XI, with Frederick and youngest brother Kenneth both playing first-class cricket for Kent – Kenneth also playing in seven Test matches for England. All four brothers served in the First World War, Kenneth being killed in action in 1916 and the others all injured.

He died at The Mount in Prees near Whitchurch in Shropshire in 1948 aged 68.
