= Percy Morfee =

English cricketer

Personal information
- Full name: Percival Ernest Morfee
- Born: 2 May 1886; Ashford, Kent
- Died: 12 February 1945 (aged 58); Darlington, County Durham
- Batting: Right-handed
- Bowling: Right-arm fast

Domestic team information
- Years: Team
- 1910–1912: Kent
- FC debut: 16 May 1910 Kent v Middlesex
- Last FC: 18 July 1912 Kent v South Africa

Career statistics
Competition	First-class
Matches	11
Runs scored	132
Batting average	13.20
100s/50s	0/0
Top score	32
Balls bowled	1,572
Wickets	28
Bowling average	33.35
5 wickets in innings	1
10 wickets in match	0
Best bowling	5/47
Catches/stumpings	12/—
- Source: CricInfo, 8 December 2009

Percival Ernest Morfee (2 May 1886 – 12 February 1945), known as Percy Morfee or Pat Morfee, was an English professional cricketer who played in 11 first-class matches for Kent County Cricket Club between 1910 and 1912.

== Early life ==
Morfee was born at Ashford in Kent in 1886, the son of George and Catherine Morfee. His father was a publican who became a railway clerk and his mother a private dressmaker by trade. Morfee followed his father and two brothers into the railway industry, leaving school to become a coach maker at the Southern Railway works at Ashford.

== Cricket career ==
A fast bowler, Morfee joined Kent's Tonbridge Nursery in 1907 and played for the county's Second XI during the same year. When Kent's primary fast bowler Arthur Fielder became ill in 1910, Morfee made his first-class cricket debut for Kent at Lord's against Middlesex, dismissing Middlesex captain and England international Plum Warner for a duck in each innings. A series of good performances in the Second XI and a recurrence of Fielder's illness saw Morfee make four more appearances for the First XI during the season, finishing with 14 wickets.

The 1911 season was less successful, although Morfee took 39 wickets and scored 400 runs, including a century, for the Second XI. He made only five First XI appearances and only one the following season, his last for the county. He was released by Kent after the 1912 season and had spells as professional in Scotland and in the Lancashire League. He played for Dunfermline and made an appearance for Scotland in 1913, and was employed as a professional in the Lancashire League with Nelson, Todmorden, and Accrington until 1931 as well as working as a groundsman in the United States in 1922 and 1923. As late as 1937 he was employed as the professional at Darlington Cricket Club. Morfee also played football, appearing for his home-town club Ashford United.

== Military service ==
Morfee enlisted as an air mechanic in the Royal Flying Corps in February 1916. He served in France from at least 1917, including at No. 1 Aircraft Depot at St Omer. Transferring to the Royal Air Force when it was formed in 1918, Morfee was transferred to the RAF Reserve in February 1919 and demobilised in 1920.

== Later life ==
Morfee married Ann Miller in 1919 at Dunferline and had one son. He worked as a driver and in industry, including as a welder in the chemical industry. He died as the result of a heart attack at Darlington in County Durham in 1945 aged 58.

== Bibliography ==
- Carlaw, Derek (2020). Kent County Cricketers, A to Z: Part One (1806–1914) (PDF). Cardiff: ACS.
