= Fred Huish =

English cricketer (1869–1957)

Personal information
- Full name: Frederick Henry Huish
- Born: 15 November 1869; Clapham, Surrey
- Died: 16 March 1957 (aged 87); Northiam, Sussex
- Batting: Right-handed
- Role: Wicket-keeper
- Relatives: Francis Huish (brother)

Domestic team information
- Years: Team
- 1895–1914: Kent
- FC debut: 3 June 1895 Kent v Warwickshire
- Last FC: 31 August 1914 Kent v Hampshire

Career statistics
Competition	First-class
Matches	497
Runs scored	7,547
Batting average	12.85
100s/50s	0/12
Top score	93
Balls bowled	101
Wickets	0
Bowling average	–
5 wickets in innings	–
10 wickets in match	–
Best bowling	–
Catches/stumpings	933/377
- Source: CricInfo, 4 February 2010

Frederick Henry Huish (15 November 1869 – 16 March 1957) was an English professional cricketer who played as a wicket-keeper for Kent County Cricket Club in the period before the First World War. Huish played over 450 times for Kent and was part of the teams which won four County championship titles in the Golden Age of cricket leading up to the war. He holds the record for the most dismissals by a wicket-keeper in first-class cricket who did not play a Test match.

Huish became an influential figure and senior professional at Kent at a time when amateur cricketers were the only acceptable captains in English county cricket. He was described in his Wisden obituary as "one of the ablest and least demonstrative wicket-keepers of his generation".

== Cricket career ==
Huish made his debut for Kent at the age of 25 in 1895 against Warwickshire at Edgbaston. He played three times in 1895 before going on to become the regular wicket-keeper for Kent from 1896 to 1914, making at least 19 appearances each season for the County. In 1899 he dismissed a then-record 79 batsmen, including taking eight catches in one match at Trent Bridge against Nottinghamshire, and went on to become the first wicket-keeper to take 100 dismissals in a season in 1911.

Huish repeated this feat in 1913 and, as of November 2017, remains the record holder for most dismissals in a career for Kent with a total of 1,254 dismissals in 469 matches. He is also second on the all-time list of first-class stumpings in a career with 377, second only to another Kent wicket-keeper Les Ames. Huish is generally considered the first in a line of great Kent wicket-keepers including the likes of Ames, Godfrey Evans and Alan Knott. He kept Jack Hubble, who succeeded Huish behind the stumps after World War I, out of the wicket-keeper role in the Kent team. Despite his record-breaking career he was never chosen as one of Wisden's Cricketers of the Year and was never called into the England team, although he is often considered unlucky not to have played internationally.

In August 1911 Huish made ten dismissals in a single match against Surrey at The Oval, a Kent record he holds jointly with Hubble. Nine of the dismissals were stumpings, the only time a wicket-keeper has claimed nine victims stumped in a match, beating the previous record of eight stumpings by Ted Pooley in 1878.

Huish played as the first choice wicket-keeper in each of Kent's County Championship winning teams of the period between 1906 and 1913. He made 151 consecutive Championship appearances for the County between 1909 and 1914 and was considered a major influence on the team – Wisden writing that he exerted "remarkable control over his colleagues" and that others would not appeal for a catch at the wicket unless he appealed first. He was a relatively poor batsman, although he scored 500 runs in a season a number of times and had a highest scored of 93.

Huish played his final first-class match at the end of the 1914 County Championship season. After the First World War, Huish, aged 49, did not resume his cricket career. In total he played 469 first-class matches for Kent and 22 times for MCC. He was selected just once for the Players and made single appearances for a variety of other teams.

== Personal life ==
Huish was born in 1869 in Clapham, at that time part of Surrey. His older brother, Francis played five first-class matches for Kent in 1895 as well as making appearances for other teams in non-first-class matches. Huish died in Northiam in Sussex in 1957 aged 87.
