= Jack Mason =

English cricketer (1874–1958)

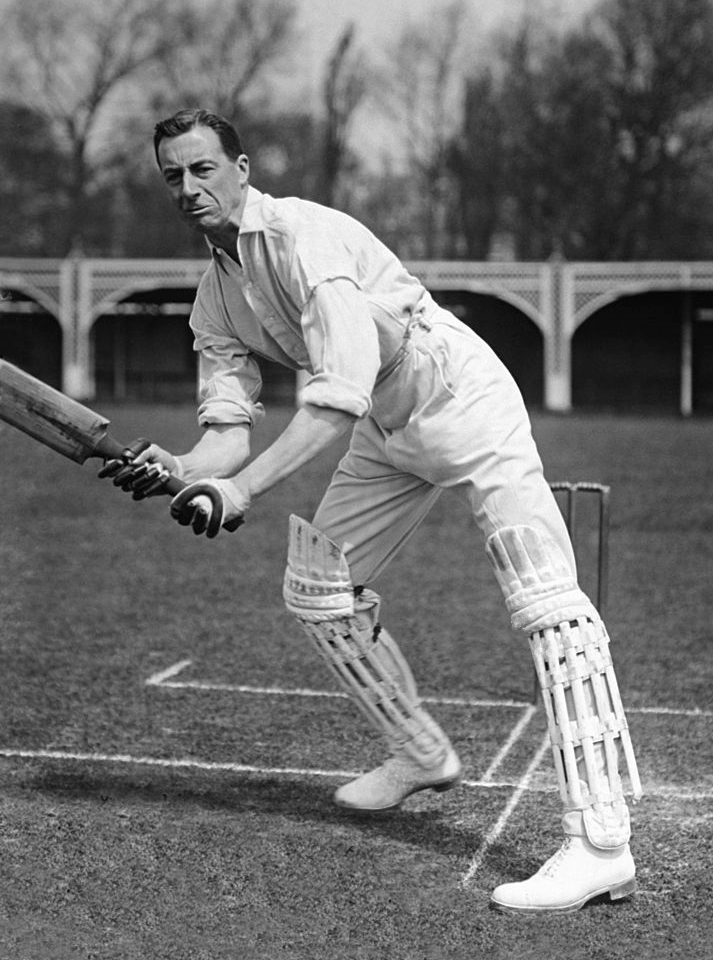
- Jack Mason in about 1905, photographed by George Beldam

Personal information
- Full name: John Richard Mason
- Born: 26 March 1874; Blackheath, Kent
- Died: 15 October 1958 (aged 84); Cooden Beach, Sussex
- Batting: Right-handed
- Bowling: Right arm fast-medium
- Role: All-rounder
- Relatives: James Mason (brother); Charles Mason (brother)

International information
- National side: England
- Test debut (cap 109): 13 December 1897 v Australia
- Last Test: 2 March 1898 v Australia

Domestic team information
- Years: Team
- 1893–1914: Kent

Career statistics
Competition	Tests	First-class
Matches	5	339
Runs scored	129	17,337
Batting average	12.90	33.27
100s/50s	0/0	34/86
Top score	32	183
Balls bowled	324	41,945
Wickets	2	848
Bowling average	74.50	22.39
5 wickets in innings	0	35
10 wickets in match	0	9
Best bowling	1/8	8/29
Catches/stumpings	3/–	391/–
- Source: CricketArchive, 16 February 2026

John Richard Mason (26 March 1874 – 15 October 1958), known as Jack Mason, was an English first-class cricketer with amateur status who played county cricket for Kent between 1893 and 1914, captaining the team between 1898 and 1902. He played for England in five Test matches on A. E. Stoddart's 1897–98 tour of Australia.

Over six feet tall, Mason was a right-handed batsman and right-arm fast-medium pace bowler, classified as a genuine all-rounder. Wisden Cricketers' Almanack considered him to be "one of the finest amateur all-rounders to play for Kent". Mason was chosen as one of the five Wisden Cricketers of the Year in 1898.

== Early life ==
Mason was born in Blackheath, then part of the county of Kent, one of seven brothers and three sisters. His father, Richard, had played for Worcestershire before the county gained first-class status, and worked as a solicitor. His mother, Ann, was the daughter of John Eagleton.

Mason attended Abbey School in Beckenham before going on to Winchester College, where he became a prolific batsman, averaging 48 and 55 in his final two years at the school. He scored 147 and 71, and took eight wickets, in one match against Eton College in 1892. He was described by Wisden in 1898, the year he was named as one of its Wisden Cricketers of the Year, as "beyond all question the finest batsman turned out in our time by Winchester College".

Mason's brothers, James and Charles, both played some first-class matches, and three other brothers were also "devoted to the game", all playing for Beckenham Cricket Club.

== Cricketing career ==
=== Kent from 1893 to 1902 ===
Mason went on to play as an amateur for Kent County Cricket Club, making his debut in 1893 after leaving school in a County Championship match against Sussex at Foxgrove Road, Beckenham in July. Despite a lacklustre second season, he became a stalwart performer and gave "splendid all-round service". He played regularly for Kent between 1894 and 1902, scoring over 1,000 runs each season from 1895. Mason took over the Kent captaincy in 1898 from Frank Marchant, a position he held for five seasons until his career as a solicitor took precedence, although he captained the team on the field during the final month of the 1909 season when Kent won the County Championship.

After the 1902 season, Mason's father told him he was no longer prepared to pay for his son's cricket career, and that it was time he joined the family firm. Mason played less often thereafter, but was still offered the captaincy of the English team to tour South Africa in 1905–06. He declined, and Pelham Warner captained the team.

=== 1897–98 tour of Australia ===
Mason toured Australia in 1897–98 as part of the England cricket team's tour. He played in all five Test matches, his only appearances for the England team. Mason performed well at the start of the tour but endured "a long spell of bad luck" and did not live up to expectations. He averaged 12.90 batting and took two wickets in the Test matches, although he scored a century in a first-class match against Victoria in Melbourne, and averaged 39.33 with the bat in first-class matches on the tour. Mason's letters written during the tour later formed the basis of Test of Time, a book about the tour written by Mason's grandson John Lazenby.

=== Kent from 1903 to 1914 ===
Mason played in the four Kent County Championship winning teams of the years leading up to the First World War, and played his final game for Kent in 1914. He made one first-class appearance after the war, for L. G. Robinson's XI against the Australian Imperial Force Touring XI in 1919 at Old Buckenham Hall in Norfolk. In total, he played 300 times for Kent, scoring over 15,000 runs and taking 769 wickets. His highest score of 183 came against Somerset at Blackheath while, in 1899, he posted an unbeaten 181 against Nottinghamshire in an unbroken partnership of 321 with Alec Hearne. This partnership, which was the highest in the county's history until 1934, remained a Kent record for the third wicket until 2005. As of April 2016, this remains the fifth highest partnership in Kent's history for any wicket. Mason scored three successive centuries in 1904 against Yorkshire, Somerset, and Essex. He appeared in eleven matches for the Gentlemen against the Players.

== Style of play ==
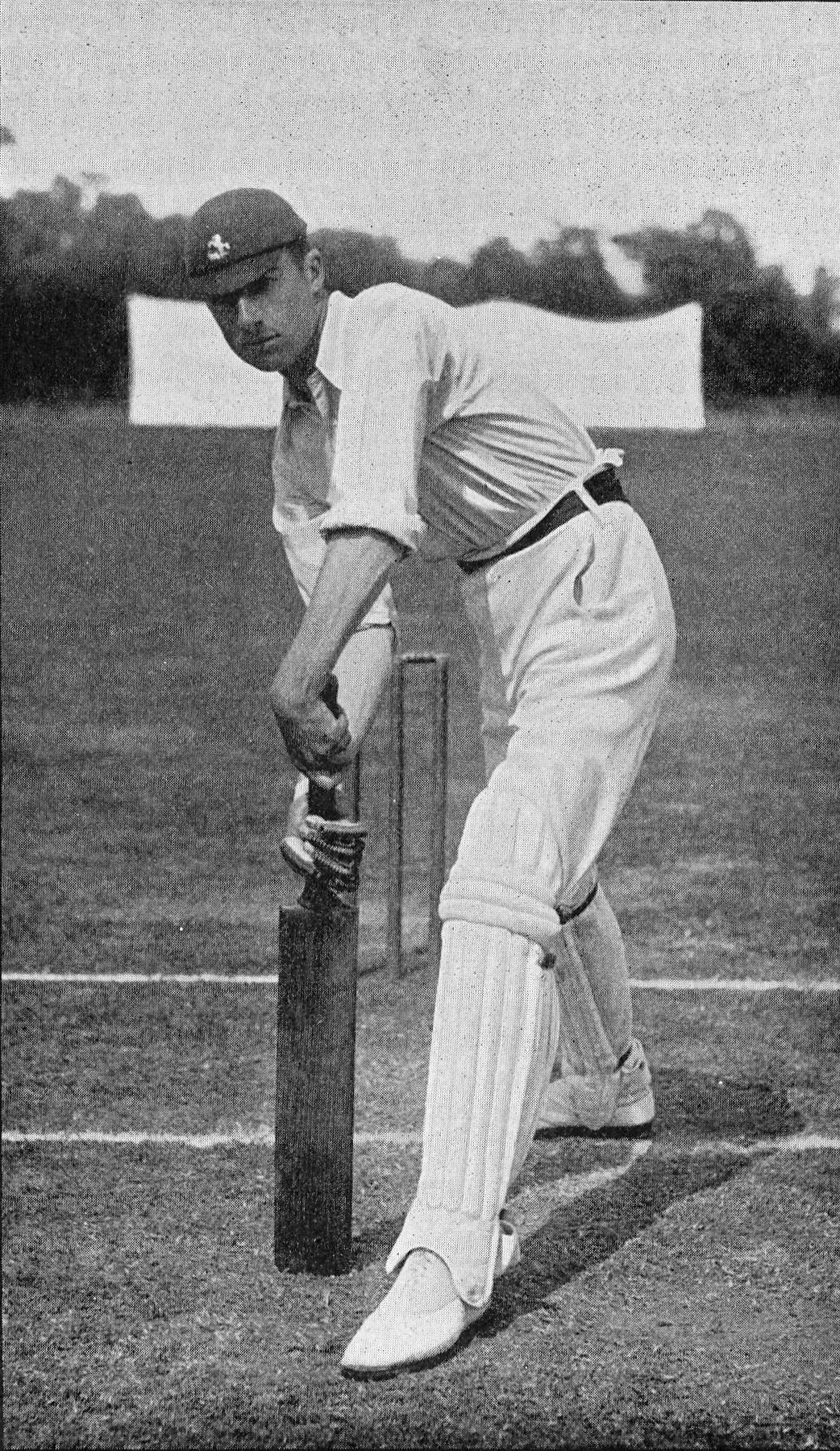
Mason playing forward in about 1897

With a height of over six feet, Mason generally played forward when batting, driving cleanly and powerfully. His Wisden obituary describes his batting style as "so straight a bat that he was always worth watching". He was equally at home on slow, turning wickets and he averaged 33.27 in first-class cricket. Mason was also an accomplished fast-medium paced bowler and was considered an excellent slip fielder.

== Military service ==
Despite being over the age for compulsory military service at the start of World War I, Mason volunteered in 1917 for service in the Royal Naval Volunteer Reserve (RNVR). He was commissioned as a sub-lieutenant in the Hydrophone Service and posted first to HMS Tarlair, the service's main research and training base at Aberdour in Fife. He was posted to one of the Hydrophone shore stations at Freshwater on the Isle of Wight and was, in 1918, promoted to Lieutenant. He volunteered to serve in the newly-formed Royal Air Force in April 1918, but was considered too important to be spared by the Hydrophone Service, which was playing a crucial role in combatting German U-boat attacks. He was demobilised in January 1919.

== Later life ==
Mason's career was as a solicitor, working at Mason and Co. in High Holborn in London. Like many amateur cricketers of the time, the time required for his profession reduced his playing time but he remained involved with Kent cricket until he moved away from the county in 1939. He was a member of the county's General Committee from 1919 and served as the club's president in 1938. He played for and was involved in the Band of Brothers club, closely associated with Kent's county team. Mason died at his home in Cooden Beach, Sussex in 1958, aged 84.

== Bibliography ==
- Lazenby, John (2005). Test of Time. John Murray. ISBN 978-07-19566-51-6.
- Lewis, Paul (2014). For Kent and Country. Eastbourne: Reveille Press. ISBN 978-19-08336-63-7.
- Wainewright, John Bannerman, ed. (1907). Winchester College, 1836-1906. A Register. Winchester: Winchester College – via Internet Archive.

Sporting positions
Preceded by Frank Marchant	Kent County Cricket Club captain 1897–1902	Succeeded by Cuthbert Burnup
