= Douglas Carr =

English cricketer (1872–1950)

- Douglas Carr in 1909

Personal information
- Full name: Douglas Ward Carr
- Born: 17 March 1872; Cranbrook, Kent
- Died: 23 March 1950 (aged 78); Salcombe Hill, Sidmouth, Devon
- Batting: Right-handed
- Bowling: Right-arm leg-break and googly
- Role: Bowler

International information
- National side: England
- Only Test (cap 162): 9 August 1909 v Australia

Domestic team information
- Years: Team
- 1909–1914: Kent

Career statistics
Competition	Test	First-class
Matches	1	58
Runs scored	0	447
Batting average	0.00	8.94
100s/50s	0/0	0/0
Top score	0	48
Balls bowled	414	10,718
Wickets	7	334
Bowling average	40.28	16.72
5 wickets in innings	1	31
10 wickets in match	0	8
Best bowling	5/146	8/36
Catches/stumpings	0/–	19/–
- Source: CricInfo, 23 April 2016

Douglas Ward Carr (17 March 1872 – 23 March 1950) was an English amateur cricketer who played once for the England cricket team in 1909. Carr only began playing first-class cricket in 1909, aged 37, for Kent County Cricket Club. A leg-break bowler who was one of the early proponents of the new googly delivery, he shot to fame in 1909 and enjoyed a short career in the years before the First World War. He was named one of Wisden's five Cricketers of the Year in 1910.

== Early life ==
Carr was educated at the New Beacon in Sevenoaks and Sutton Valence School. He studied at Brasenose College, Oxford and while there played both football and cricket for the university. He injured his knee playing football, and as a result did not make any first-class cricket appearances for the University.

== Cricket career ==
After leaving Oxford, he spent some years playing club cricket in the Maidstone area. It was during this period, in 1908, that he learnt to bowl the then fairly new googly. The following May he made his first-class debut for Kent against his old university, and took seven wickets in the match, including 5/65 in the first innings. His next chances came in July, in two Gentlemen v Players games, and again he met with success, taking a total of fifteen wickets in the four innings.

Carr quickly established himself as a member of the Kent side, and by the second week of August had claimed 42 wickets in his first six first-class games. There was now a clamour for his inclusion in the England team, all the more so as England were 2–1 down in the 1909 Ashes series at the time. The selectors agreed, and although Carr was twelfth man for the drawn game at Old Trafford, he was picked for the final match of the series at The Oval, becoming the first man ever to play Test cricket for England in his first year in the first-class game. Carr took 7/282 in the match, including 5/146 in the first innings, although his efforts could not force an English victory and the resulting draw meant that the Australians carried off the Ashes. Newspapers and Wisden heavily criticised the England captain Archie MacLaren for over-bowling Carr.

1909 was also Carr's best in first-class cricket as a whole, as he took 95 wickets including an analysis of 8/36 from 28.1 overs against Somerset. He equaled these innings figures three years later against Gloucestershire. Named a Wisden Cricketer of the Year, in 1910 he helped Kent to the 1910 County Championship title, and in 1912 he averaged just 12.01 in taking 61 first-class wickets.

A poor batsman, Carr never made a half-century, and in his later years his batting declined even further. In his last significant season (1913) he scored only 95 runs in 17 innings. In 1914 he played only one match, in late July against Surrey, bowling 28 overs but not taking a wicket. The start of World War I a few weeks later brought an end to his cricketing career. Carr died at the age of 78 in Salcombe Hill near Sidmouth in Devon.
