= Kenneth Hutchings =

English cricketer (1882–1916)

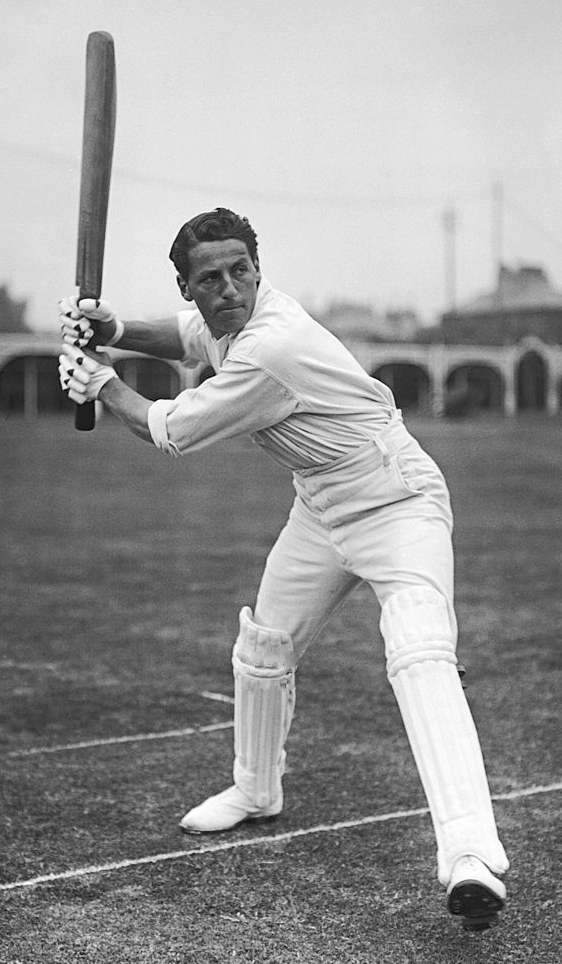
- Hutchings photographed by George Beldam in about 1905

Personal information
- Full name: Kenneth Lotherington Hutchings
- Born: 7 December 1882; Southborough, Kent, England
- Died: 3 September 1916 (aged 33); Ginchy, Somme, France
- Batting: Right-handed
- Bowling: Right-arm fast
- Relatives: Frederick Hutchings (brother); William Hutchings (brother)

International information
- National side: England
- Test debut (cap 155): 13 December 1907 v Australia
- Last Test: 11 August 1909 v Australia

Domestic team information
- Years: Team
- 1902–1912: Kent

Career statistics
Competition	Test	First-class
Matches	7	207
Runs scored	341	10,054
Batting average	28.41	33.62
100s/50s	1/1	22/56
Top score	126	176
Balls bowled	90	1,439
Wickets	1	24
Bowling average	81.00	39.08
5 wickets in innings	0	0
10 wickets in match	0	0
Best bowling	1/5	4/15
Catches/stumpings	9/–	179/–
- Source: CricInfo, 29 December 2008
- Military career
- Allegiance: United Kingdom
- Branch: British Army
- Service years: 1914–1916
- Units: 12th Battalion, King's Liverpool Regiment
- Conflicts: First World War: Battle of the Somme; Battle of Guillemont †

Kenneth Lotherington Hutchings (7 December 1882 – 3 September 1916) was an English amateur cricketer who played for Kent County Cricket Club and the England cricket team between 1902 and 1912. He was primarily a batsman who played a major role in three of Kent's County Championship wins in the years before World War I and who played seven Test matches for England. He was chosen as one of Wisden's Cricketers of the Year in 1907. Hutchings was killed in action during the Battle of the Somme whilst serving with the King's Liverpool Regiment in 1916.

== Early life ==
Hutchings was born in Southborough near Tunbridge Wells, the fourth son of Dr Edward Hutchings who was a keen cricketer. He was educated at Tonbridge School where he played in the First XI for five years between 1898 and 1902, captaining the school in his last two years there and also playing rackets for the school in 1901 at Queen's Club. In 1902 he averaged 63 runs per innings, including a score of 205.

== Cricket career ==
Hutchings made his first-class cricket debut in 1902, playing once for Kent in the 1902 County Championship. He played fluently in 11 Championship matches in 1903 and toured America with Kent, playing against the Gentlemen of Philadelphia, but only made three appearances in total for the County in 1904 and 1905, scoring two half centuries.

His first full season for Kent in 1906 was the most productive of his career. His "ultra-attacking batting" saw him score 1,454 runs for the County at an average of 60.58, a major role in Kent winning their first County Championship title. He led the county in runs scored despite only playing in 18 games out of a possible 25 during the season. He scored four centuries and played, according to Wisden with "amazing brilliancy" whilst The Guardian described him as "the most brilliant" of Kent's batsmen in a team with very strong batting. He was picked for the Gentlemen v Players match and was chosen as one of Wisden's Cricketers of the Year in 1907.

Hutchings was selected for the England cricket team to tour Australia in 1907–08, making his Test match debut in December 1907 at Sydney. He scored his highest Test score of 126 at Melbourne on the tour, reaching his hundred in 126 minutes, his second fifty taking only 51 minutes.

Hutchings never completely recaptured his form of 1906 and Wisden wrote that he "did not fulfil all the hopes formed of him", although he scored over 1,000 first-class runs in every English domestic season between 1906 and 1911. His best seasons, other than 1906, were in 1909 and 1910 when Kent won consecutive County Championships, and he was picked for two Ashes Tests in England in 1909. His form failed him in 1912 and he was dropped from the Kent First XI in June and did not play first-class cricket of any kind after the end of the 1912 season.

== Style of play ==
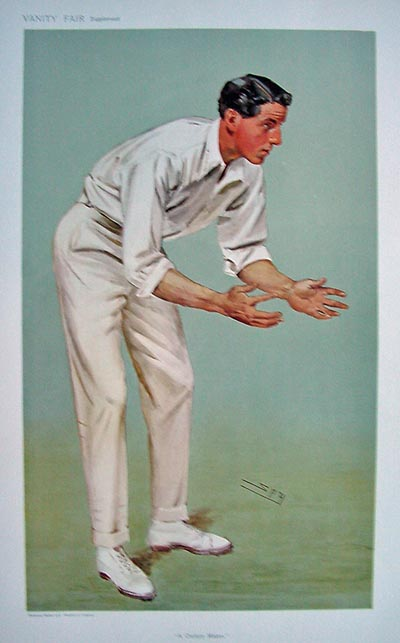
"A Century Maker" Hutchings as caricatured by Spy (Leslie Ward) in Vanity Fair, August 1907

Hutchings was regarded as a hard hitting and graceful batsman. Commenting on his 1906 permanence, Wisden writes that "the consistency of his batting was not less astonishing than its brilliancy". It goes on to say that "Batting so remarkable and individual as his, has not been seen since Ranjitsinhji and Trumper first delighted the cricket world", comparing him to two great cricketers of the time, although his obituary is clear that he did not fulfil the potential that the 1906 season clearly showed.

He was considered an attacking batsman who could score all around the wicket with "a style that is entirely his own". He scored quickly when on form and was an "ideal cricketer". His cover drive was considered particularly effective and hard hitting as well as attractive – A. A. Thomson wrote of him: "Though a crabbed unemotional Northerner, I sometimes think that if one last fragment of cricket had to be preserved, as though in amber, it should be a glimpse of K. L. Hutchings cover-driving under a summer heaven." According to David Denton and George Hirst, he hit the ball harder than any other player of their time (and they were contemporaries of Gilbert Jessop, one of the harder hitting batsmen of the Golden Age of cricket).

== Military service and death ==
Hutchings worked at Wiggins Teape, a paper manufacturer near Dover, when he played for Kent, working alongside Keith Barlow who played twice for Kent and went on to be the Chairman of the company. At the start of World War I he was working for another paper manufacturer in Liverpool and living at Freshfield in Formby. He enlisted within a few days of the start of the war, serving in the King's Liverpool Regiment and was sent to France in April 1915. He was attached to the Welch Regiment for a time and promoted to Lieutenant in December 1916. From July 1916 he served with the 12th battalion the King's Liverpool Regiment.

Hutchings was killed in action on 3 September 1916 at Ginchy in northern France during the Battle of Guillemont as part of the Battle of the Somme. He was hit by an artillery shell and, according to Wisden, killed instantly. At the time of his death he was described as the most famous cricketer to have died in the Great War, with the Daily Telegraph writing that "one of the greatest cricketers has been taken from us". His body was never recovered and his name appears on the Thiepval Memorial.

After his death, members of his regiment fashioned a wooden cross with a metal plaque as a memorial to the officers who had died at Ginchy, including Hutchings' name on the plaque. After the war the cross was moved to Formby. A restored cross, with the original metal plaque, stands in the churchyard of St Peter's Church, Formby.

All three of his brothers played cricket for Tonbridge School and served in the war, all being wounded or injured in the process. Two of his brothers, William and Frederick also played first-class cricket for Kent.
