= Champion County match =

Cricket match

The Champion County match is a cricket match, traditionally played between the winner of the previous season's County Championship, and the Marylebone Cricket Club (MCC). The match was played at Lord's Cricket Ground for many seasons, but from 2010 to 2017 it took place at the Sheikh Zayed Stadium in Abu Dhabi. The 2018 match was played at the Kensington Oval ground in Bridgetown, Barbados.

== History ==
The earliest record of a Champion County match is in 1901, when the 1901 County Championship winners, Yorkshire, faced the "Rest of England" at the end of the season at Lord's Cricket Ground. Yorkshire lost the match heavily; Gilbert Jessop scored a double century for the Rest of England, while Albert Trott took thirteen wickets in the match. Yorkshire won the County Championship again the following season, and the fixture was repeated, though on this occasion the match was drawn. In 1903, Middlesex were the County Champions, and the fixture moved to The Oval, and was once again a draw. This format continued for the next ten years, although in 1913 the fixture was in jeopardy, as a number of Kent's players were unable to make the match. Accordingly, their team was bolstered by players from Yorkshire, who had finished as runners-up, and the team was labelled "Kent and Yorkshire". The fixture was suspended during the First World War, but returned at the end of the 1919 season, when Yorkshire were once again the County Champions. The fixture was played annually through until 1935, but was next played in 1947, and next after that in 1955. The match was played irregularly through the late 1950s and the 1960s, and on one occasion was contested at North Marine Road Ground, Scarborough.

In 1970, the fixture was played at the start of the following season for the first time. Rather than facing the "Rest of England", the 1969 County Champions, Glamorgan, faced the Marylebone Cricket Club at Lord's in April 1970. The MCC won the match by six wickets. The fixture continued in this format until 1992, when rather than face the MCC, the 1991 County Champions Essex played against England A. In 1996 and 1997, the County Champions were not involved at all, with England A facing the "Rest of England" to open the season, while from 1998 until 2003 no exhibition match was played to open the season. The match was reintroduced in 2004, reverting to the MCC hosting the Champion County at Lord's. Six years later, the match moved to the Sheikh Zayed Stadium in Abu Dhabi and then, in 2018, to Barbados. At the same time, the match began to be played as a day/night game with a pink ball.

The 2020 match between MCC and Essex was scheduled to be played at Galle International Stadium in Sri Lanka in March 2020 but was cancelled due to the COVID-19 pandemic. The fixture has not been scheduled in any of the following seasons.
