= Razor Smith =

English cricket player (1877-1946)

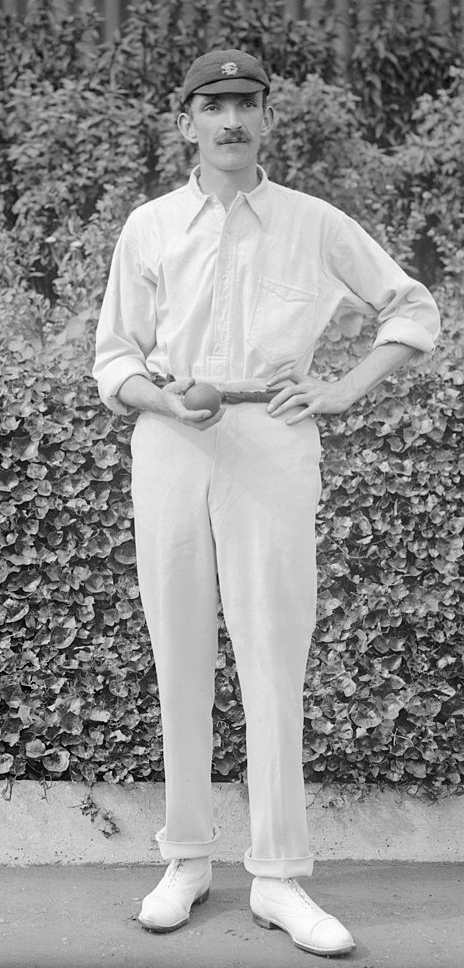
- Smith in about 1905

Personal information
- Born: 4 October 1877; Oxford, England
- Died: 15 July 1946 (aged 68); Bermondsey, London, England
- Batting: Right-handed
- Bowling: Right-arm off-break

Career statistics
Competition	First-class
Matches	245
Runs scored	3,453
Batting average	12.69
100s/50s	1/4
Top score	126
Balls bowled	45,296
Wickets	1,077
Bowling average	17.55
5 wickets in innings	95
10 wickets in match	27
Best bowling	9/31
Catches/stumpings	158/–
- Source: CricketArchive, 20 August 2021

William Charles "Razor" Smith (4 October 1877 – 15 July 1946) was a Surrey slow bowler. Nicknamed "Razor" because of his extreme thinness, Smith was a frail man and prone to serious injury; he could rarely get through a full season's cricket, but when fit and healthy, could command the sharpest off-break among bowlers of his day. He was also able to bowl a somewhat faster ball with a very high flight that turned a little from leg and, with any help from the pitch, would get up almost straight.

This combination meant that when wickets were treacherous Smith generally proved deadly, but in less favourable conditions he was rarely effective and his slight build meant he was unsuited to large amounts of work as a "stock" bowler even though he had the extreme accuracy required. Consequently, he never came into consideration for Test selection, though he showed great ability on many occasions against the very best batting sides.

Smith was discovered by the great W.G. Grace in the late 1890s and recommended immediately to Surrey, where he had already taken up residence. He took 5 for 50 against a weak Derbyshire side on his County Championship debut in 1900, but played little first-class cricket until 1904. He proved unplayable on wet wickets early in the season, but did nothing when the weather turned dry and was quickly dropped until the last two games. Still, Smith was third in the first-class averages in his first full season. In 1905, he first came to the public eye with a surprising performance against the Australians on a dry pitch at the Oval, in which his fine off-break made him for a time irresistible, and an amazing 7 for 11 against Northamptonshire on a really sticky pitch.

Between 1906 and 1908, Smith was in and out of the Surrey team, but he still headed the averages in 1908 with 58 wickets for just over 14 each. However, it was in 1909 that "Razor" became one of the leading bowlers of the day – despite injuries again keeping him out of many games. He took 95 wickets for under 13 runs each in a wet summer, and his dismissal of Yorkshire for 26 caused a sensation.

It was in 1910 that "Razor" reached the zenith of his fame: his 247 wickets was 72 ahead of his nearest rival and cost only fractionally more than in 1909. With many soft wickets, Smith was frequently unplayable, and the amount of work he got through seemed to shatter thoughts his body was fragile. His success was due in part to a new delivery, a fast kicking leg break in addition to his usual sharp off spinner. Many of his wickets came courtesy of the brave close fielding of Bill Hitch at short leg. Smith took 14 for 29 at the Oval against Northamptonshire, doing the hat-trick in the second innings and being denied one in the first by a dropped catch.

In 1911, despite most pitches being totally unhelpful in an exceptionally dry summer, Smith seized his few chances so well that he was second highest wicket-taker in the country with 160. 1912 was a wet summer that suited Smith's bowling, yet prior to the last three games he had been so out of form – bowling when clearly unfit – that he had the poor record of 69 wickets at 21.43 each. Deadly bowling in the last three games improved his record, yet he was a complete failure (aside from his only first-class century at No. 11) on a Marylebone Cricket Club (MCC) tour of the West Indies. 1913 was basically a repeat of 1912 – "Razor" came into form only at the tail end of the season – and in 1914 Smith could rarely play due to injuries continuing to recur.

After World War I, it was clear "Razor"’s body would not allow him to play more cricket, and he spent the rest of his life working for the bat firm Surridge’s. Smith worked there right up until his death from heart failure in 1946.
