= Lionel Troughton =

English cricketer

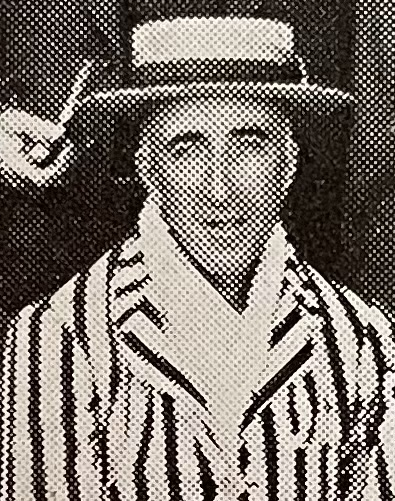

Personal information
- Full name: Lionel Holmes Wood Troughton
- Born: 17 May 1879; Seaford, East Sussex
- Died: 31 August 1933 (aged 54); Southwark, London
- Batting: Right-handed
- Bowling: Right arm medium

Domestic team information
- Years: Team
- 1907–1923: Kent

Career statistics
Competition	First-class
Matches	180
Runs scored	4,013
Batting average	17.14
100s/50s	1/12
Top score	104
Balls bowled	18
Wickets	0
Bowling average	–
5 wickets in innings	–
10 wickets in match	–
Best bowling	–
Catches/stumpings	80/–
- Source: CricInfo, 5 April 2009

Lionel Holmes Wood Troughton MC (17 May 1879 – 31 August 1933) was an English amateur cricketer who played first-class cricket for Kent County Cricket Club before and after the First World War. Primarily a batsman, Troughton was club captain of Kent between 1914 and 1923. He served in the Rifle Brigade during the First World War, rising to the rank of lieutenant colonel and being awarded the Military Cross.

== Early life ==
Troughton was born in Seaford, East Sussex in 1879, the son of William and Kate Troughton. His father was a wine and spirits merchant who later became a solicitor at Gravesend in Kent, a profession which his son followed him into. He attended Dulwich College and played cricket for the school First XI during 1897.

== Cricket career ==
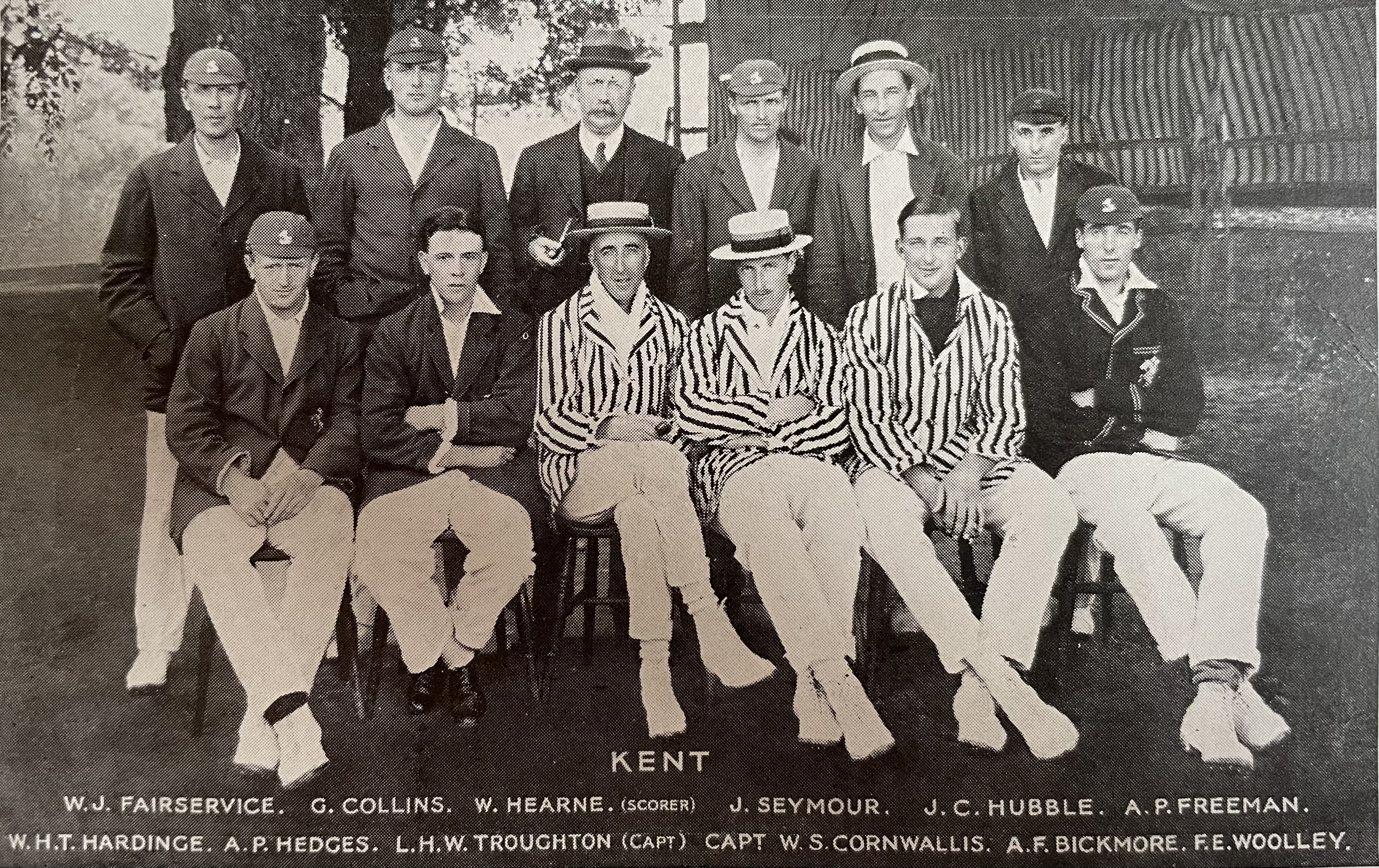
Troughton with the Kent team of about 1922

Troughton first played for Kent's Second XI in 1900, but did not make his first-class cricket debut until 1907 when he appeared against Essex at the County Ground, Leyton in a County Championship match in June. He played only occasionally for Kent until 1913, never making more than five appearances for the First XI in any season, but played regularly for the Second XI, captaining them for a number of years.

Troughton went on a Marylebone Cricket Club (MCC) tour of Argentina led by Archie MacLaren in 1911–12. He played in all three first-class matches on the tour, the first first-class matches played by Argentina, and scored a century in another match against Combined Camps in Buenos Aires. In 1914 Troughton succeeded Ted Dillon as Kent captain, a post he held until 1923. He played much more regularly for the First XI as captain, making 30 first-class appearances in 1914 and at least 18 in each year he was captain. He scored 776 runs in 1914 and 761 in 1921, his best seasons, although his Wisden obituary described him as "never a very prominent batsman". Troughton did prove, however, to be a "capable captain". He was appointed captain of an MCC team of amateurs to tour New Zealand in 1920–21, but plans for the tour had to be abandoned when the New Zealand Cricket Council was unable to raise sufficient money.

His final first-class season was in 1923 after which he became the club's general manager, succeeding Tom Pawley in the post. He held this post until his death in 1933. He was succeeded as club captain by Stanley Cornwallis.

== Military career ==
Troughton was commissioned, initially as a second lieutenant, in the Rifle Brigade (The Prince Consort's Own) during the First World War. He served with the 10th (Service) Battalion on the Western Front from 1915, rising to command the battalion with the rank of lieutenant colonel. In September 1916, whilst a company commander, he was awarded the Military Cross for leading his men in an attack at Guillemont with "conspicuous gallantry", as well as a Légion d'honneur, Croix d'Officiers, the first to be awarded in XIV Corps. He was captured and made a prisoner of war during a German attack at Cambrai in 1917, and was decommissioned at the end of the war.

== Bibliography ==
- Carlaw, Derek (2020). Kent County Cricketers, A to Z: Part One (1806–1914) (PDF). Cardiff: ACS.

Sporting positions
Preceded by Ted Dillon	Kent County Cricket Club captain 1914–1923	Succeeded by Stanley Cornwallis
