= Punter Humphreys =

English cricketer

Personal information
- Full name: Edward Humphreys
- Born: 24 August 1881; Ditton, Kent
- Died: 6 November 1949 (aged 68); Maidstone, Kent
- Nickname: Punter
- Batting: Right-handed
- Bowling: Slow left-arm orthodox

Domestic team information
- Years: Team
- 1899–1920: Kent
- FC debut: 31 July 1899 Kent v Surrey
- Last FC: 4 August 1920 Kent v Middlesex

Career statistics
Competition	First-class
Matches	393
Runs scored	16,603
Batting average	27.95
100s/50s	22/86
Top score	208
Balls bowled	20,209
Wickets	379
Bowling average	24.57
5 wickets in innings	12
10 wickets in match	2
Best bowling	7/33
Catches/stumpings	229/–
- Source: Cricinfo, 1 March 2016

Edward Humphreys (24 August 1881 – 6 November 1949), known as Punter Humphreys, was an English professional cricketer who played first-class cricket for Kent County Cricket Club between 1899 and 1920. He played nearly 400 first-class matches and coached cricket after his retirement.

== Early life ==
Humphreys was born at Ditton in Kent in 1881. He was the ninth son of Henry and Kate Humphreys, his father being the landlord of the Walnut Inn in Ditton. He was one of the first young players to be accepted into Kent's Tonbridge Nursery when it opened in 1897, initially as a slow left-arm bowler.

== Cricket career ==
Humphreys made his debut at age 17 for Kent in 1899, playing against Surrey at The Oval. He developed into a right-handed opening batsman who bowled well enough to take over 350 wickets in his career. He was a regular as a professional in the Kent teams which won four County Championships in the years before World War I at a time when the county had very strong batting. His highest first-class score of 208 was made against Gloucestershire at Catford in 1909, at the time the highest individual score made by a Kent batsman in an innings. He made the other double century of his career the following season.

Humphreys was described as a highly skilled batsman and a "magnificent" fielder. He put on 248 runs with Arthur Day for the seventh wicket in 1908 against Somerset at the County Ground, Taunton, a Kent record for the seventh wicket partnership which still stands as of 2017.

As well as playing for Kent, Humphreys played for and coached the Canterbury cricket team in New Zealand, making three first-class appearances for them in 1908–09. He also coached in Jamaica a number of times and was part of the Marylebone Cricket Club (MCC) which toured the West Indies in 1912–13.

== Military service ==
During World War I Humphreys served in the Royal Navy. He enlisted in the Royal Naval Volunteer Reserve in 1915 before being posted as an Ordinary Seaman to HMS Thames with the Royal Navy in 1917. He transferred to HMS Arrogant in May 1917. This was a depot ship for submarines and small craft, and Humphreys was transferred to the Coastal Motor Boats (CMB) of the Dover Patrol and promoted to Able Seaman.

The CMB units operated from England and from a base near Dunkirk in northern France, patrolling the coastlines and the Dover Straits. He was stationed at Dunkirk and took part in the First Ostend Raid in April 1918, the CMB units laying smoke for the less successful element of the Zeebrugge Raid which attacked Ostend. He played some cricket whilst with the Navy, including a match in June 1918 for an England XI against the Dominions. He left the Navy in February 1918.

== Later life ==
Humphreys took a position as cricket coach at Uppingham School after he was demobilised from the Navy in 1919. This restricted his playing time for Kent to the school holidays and he only played 11 first-class matches in 1919 and 1920 before he retired from playing cricket professionally. In 1929 Lord Harris recruited Humphreys to the position of head coach at Kent, a role he retained until 1948 when he was succeeded by Claude Lewis.

Humphreys died in November 1949 at Maidstone in Kent aged 68.

== Bibliography ==
- Carlaw, Derek (2020). Kent County Cricketers, A to Z: Part One (1806–1914) (PDF). Cardiff: ACS.
