= List of Kent County Cricket Club seasons =

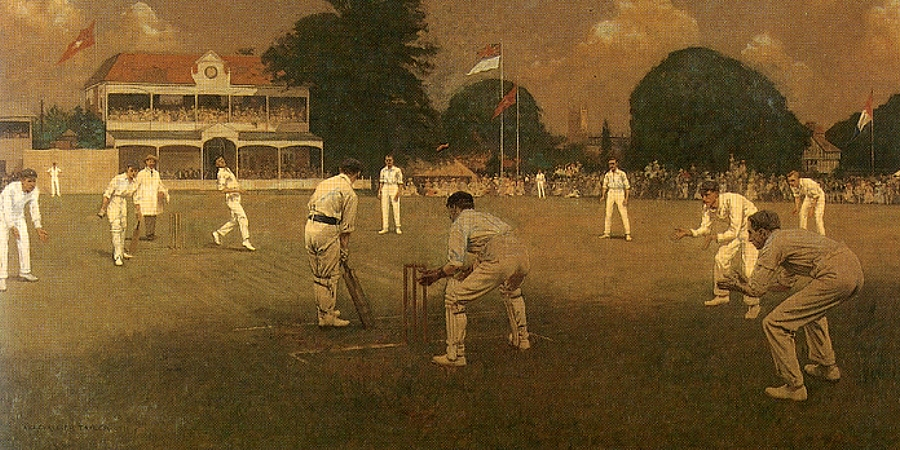
Kent vs Lancashire at Canterbury by Albert Chevallier Tayler, which was commissioned by Kent to celebrate their 1906 County Championship victory.

This is a list of seasons played by Kent County Cricket Club in English cricket. It summarises the club's achievements in major competitions, and the top run-scorers and wicket-takers in the County Championship for each season.

Kent County Cricket Club was formed in August 1846 and played their first competitive match in the same month against an England team at White Hart Field in Bromley. Before the official formation of the County club, teams had represented Kent for many years, with the first recorded match involving Kent taking place in 1719 against a London team. In the years before the formation of the County Championship the club competed in County cricket as well as playing other first class matches. Kent have played in every County championship since the official formation of the competition in 1890, winning the competition seven times, including four times during the Golden Age of cricket in the early years of the 20th century.

== Seasons ==
The list below contains details of the county's performance in every English domestic competition since the formation of the County Championship in 1890.

Season	County Championship											One Day League (Note: The initial one day league competition took place in the 1969 season. Until 1998 it was known as the Sunday League as matches generally took place on Sundays. Between 1999 and 2009 it was known as the National League or the Pro40, with the competition split into two divisions.)			One Day Cup (Note: The initial one day cup competition took place in the 1963 season as the Gillette Cup. Names have included: Gillette Cup (1963–1980), NatWest Trophy (1981–2000), C&G Trophy (2001–2006), Friends Provident Trophy (2007–2009), ECB 40 (2010–2013) and Royal London One-Day Cup (2014 onwards).)	B&H (Note: The Benson & Hedges Cup competition ran from the 1972 season until 2002.)	T20 (Note: The Twenty20 competition first took place in the 2003 season. Names have included the Twenty20 Cup (2003–2009), Friends Life t20 (2010–2013) and NatWest t20 Blast (2014 onwards).)	Notes
Season	Div (Note: The County Championship was split into two divisions in 2000.)	P	W	L	D	Tie	A	Pts	Pos	Most runs	Most wickets	Div (Note: The National League was split into two divisions in 1999.)	Pts	Pos	One Day Cup	B&H	T20	Notes
1890		14	6	3	5	0	0	3	3rd	Alec Hearne 473	Frederick Martin 88							
1891		16	4	5	6	0	1	−1	5th	Frank Marchant 584	Frederick Martin 98							
1892		16	2	9	5	0	0	−7	7th	Alec Hearne 626	Walter Hearne 88							
1893		16	6	4	6	0	0	2	4th	Alec Hearne 558	Alec Hearne 63							
1894		16	6	6	3	0	1	0	4th	Frank Marchant 601	Walter Hearne 99							
1895		18	3	11	4	0	0	−8	14th	Alec Hearne 903	Alec Hearne 66							
1896		18	5	9	4	0	0	−4	9th	Jack Mason 1,117	Frederick Martin 70							
1897		18	2	10	6	0	0	−8	12th	Jack Mason 1,107	Frederick Martin 50							
1898		20	5	6	9	0	0	−1	7th	Jack Mason 1,197	Frederick Martin 66							
1899		20	6	8	5	0	1	−2	8th	Cuthbert Burnup 1,368	Bill Bradley 112							
1900		22	8	4	10	0	0	4	3rd	Jack Mason 1,662	Colin Blythe 114							
1901		22	7	7	7	0	1	0	7th	Jack Mason 1,272	Bill Bradley 102							
1902		22	8	8	6	0	0	0	7th	Cuthbert Burnup 1,349	Colin Blythe 111							
1903		22	7	6	7	0	2	1	8th	Cuthbert Burnup 1,037	Colin Blythe 137							
1904		21	10	4	7	0	0	6	3rd	Punter Humphreys 1,452	Colin Blythe 121							(Note: A match against Yorkshire at Harrogate was declared void after the pitch was suspected to have been tampered with after the first days play. Statistics from the valid first days play were struck from all records.)
1905		22	10	7	4	1	0	3	6th	James Seymour 1,284	Colin Blythe 130							
1906		22	16	2	4	0	0	14	1st	Kenneth Hutchings 1,358	Arthur Fielder 158							
1907		26	12	9	5	0	0	3	8th	James Seymour 1,483	Arthur Fielder 151							
1908		26	17	3	5	0	1	14	2nd	James Seymour 1,344	Colin Blythe 167							
1909		26	16	2	8	0	0	14	1st	Kenneth Hutchings 1,251	Colin Blythe 178							
1910		26 (Note: The match against Lancashire as Old Trafford was officially "not counted" as no play took place on the second day due to the funeral of Edward VII. Statistics from the first and third days of the match are officially recorded.)	19	3	3	0	0	19	1st	Punter Humphreys 1,483	Colin Blythe 149							
1911		26	17	4	5	0	0	96	2nd	James Seymour 1,619	Colin Blythe 125							
1912		26	14	5	6	0	0	82	3rd	Wally Hardinge 1,151	Colin Blythe 170							
1913		28	20	3	4	0	0	110	1st	Wally Hardinge 1,949	Colin Blythe 145							
1914		28	16	7	5	0	0	87	3rd	Frank Woolley 1,933	Colin Blythe 159							
No competitive cricket was played between 1915 and 1918 due to the First World War.
1919		14	6	1	7	0	0	6	2nd	Wally Hardinge 888	Frank Woolley 90							
1920		26	16	6	3	0	0	82	5th	Frank Woolley 1,548	Frank Woolley 164							
1921		26	16	7	3	0	0	84	4th	Wally Hardinge 1,919	Tich Freeman 156							
1922		28	16	3	8	0	0	86	4th	Wally Hardinge 2,068	Tich Freeman 194							
1923		28	15	9	3	0	0	75	5th	Frank Woolley 1,662	Tich Freeman 148							
1924		28	12	4	10	0	0	81	5th	James Seymour 1,533	Tich Freeman 146							
1925		28	15	7	2	0	0	79	5th	Frank Woolley 1,990	Tich Freeman 146							
1926		28	15	2	11	0	0	92	3rd	Wally Hardinge 2,174	Tich Freeman 163							
1927		30	12	6	10	0	2	129	4th	Wally Hardinge 1,519	Tich Freeman 158							
1928		30	15	5	10	0	0	167	2nd	Frank Woolley 2,582	Tich Freeman 216							
1929		28	12	8	8	0	0	132	8th	Wally Hardinge 1,761	Tich Freeman 199							
1930		28	12	7	9	0	0	133	5th	Frank Woolley 1,823	Tich Freeman 249							
1931		28	12	7	9	0	0	216	3rd	Frank Woolley 1,659	Tich Freeman 241							
1932		28	14	3	10	0	1	248	3rd	Les Ames 1,958	Tich Freeman 209							
1933		30	15	8	7	0	0	253	3rd	Les Ames 2,150	Tich Freeman 252							
1934		30	12	7	11	0	0	225	5th	Frank Woolley 2,447	Tich Freeman 187							
1935		30	10	12	8	0	0	185	10th	Frank Woolley 2,187	Tich Freeman 201							
1936		28	9	9	10	0	0	174	8th	Arthur Fagg 1,686	Tich Freeman 103							
1937		28	8	16	4	0	0	136	12th	Les Ames 1,909	Alan Watt 108							
1938		28	8	14	5	0	0	120	9th	Arthur Fagg 2,297	Doug Wright 88							
1939		28	14	9	3	0	1 (Note: Kent's match with Middlesex, due to start on 2 September 1939, was cancelled due to the outbreak of the Second World War.)	180	5th	Les Ames 1,846	Doug Wright 131							
No competitive cricket was played between 1940 and 1945 due to the Second World War.
1946		26	11	8	7	0	0	144	6th	Les Todd 1,864	Doug Wright 113							
1947		26	12	8	6	0	0	172	4th	Les Ames 2,137	Doug Wright 136							
1948		26	4	11	11	0	0	76	15th	Arthur Fagg 2,404	Doug Wright 71							
1949		26	7	15	4	0	0	96	13th	Les Ames 1,862	Doug Wright 111							
1950		28	6	12	9	1	0	108	9th	Arthur Fagg 2,019	Doug Wright 141							
1951		28	4	15	9	0	0	60	16th	Arthur Fagg 2,046	Ray Dovey 93							
1952		28	5	15	8	0	0	84	15th	Arthur Fagg 1,442	Doug Wright 111							
1953		28	4	14	10	0	0	64	16th	Arthur Fagg 1,347	Doug Wright 90							
1954		28	5	7	16	0	0	100	11th	Bob Wilson 1,324	Doug Wright 105							
1955		28	8	13	7	0	0	104	13th	Arthur Fagg 1,291	Doug Wright 127							
1956		28	4	12	12	0	0	60	16th	Arthur Phebey 1,357	Fred Ridgway 82							
1957		28	6	13	9	0	0	90	14th	Bob Wilson 1,760	David Halfyard 112							
1958		28	9	10	8	0	1	139	8th	Arthur Phebey 1,087	David Halfyard 126							
1959		28	8	12	8	0	0	128	13th	Bob Wilson 1,769	David Halfyard 121							
1960		28	7	7	14	0	0	118	10th	Peter Richardson 1,429	David Halfyard 123							
1961		28	8	8	12	0	0	132	11th	Peter Richardson 1,919	David Halfyard 110							
1962		28	7	9	12	0	0	110	11th	Peter Richardson 1,997	David Halfyard 98							
1963		28	5	6	17	0	0	68	13th	Peter Richardson 1,798	Derek Underwood 96				R1			
1964		28	9	6	13	0	0	108	7th	Bob Wilson 1,979	Alan Dixon 121				R2			
1965		28	8	5	15	0	0	96	5th	Brian Luckhurst 1,418	Alan Dixon 113				R2			
1966		28	11	8	9	0	0	144	4th	Brian Luckhurst 1,553	Derek Underwood 143				R2			
1967		28	11	3	13	0	1	176	2nd	Colin Cowdrey 1,101	Derek Underwood 111				Won			
1968		28	12	5	11	0	0	256	2nd	Mike Denness 1,299	Derek Underwood 91				R2			
1969		24	4	6	14	0	0	151	10th	Brian Luckhurst 1,593	Norman Graham 77		38	4th	R2			
1970		24	9	5	10	0	0	237	1st	Mike Denness 1,445	John Shepherd 84		48	2nd	QF			
1971		24	7	6	11	0	0	234	4th	Mike Denness 1,391	Derek Underwood 97		32	8th	RU			
1972		20	7	4	9	0	0	191	2nd	Brian Luckhurst 1,345	Derek Underwood 52		45	1st	SF	Grp		
1973		20	4	3	13	0	0	197	4th	Graham Johnson 1,175	John Shepherd 78		50	1st	QF	Won		
1974		20	5	8	7	0	0	146	10th	Brian Luckhurst 1,035	Bob Woolmer 54		44	3rd	Won	QF		
1975		20	8	4	8	0	0	209	5th	Asif Iqbal 1,262	Derek Underwood 57		48	3rd	R2	Grp		
1976		20	5	7	8	0	0	155	14th	Bob Woolmer 1,222	Derek Underwood 48		40	1st (Note: Kent won the 1976 John Player League on average run rate, having tied on points with four other counties.)	R2	Won		
1977		22	9	2	10	0	1	227	1st (Note: The 1977 County Championship title was shared between Kent and Middlesex.)	Asif Iqbal 1,224	John Shepherd 87		34	6th	R1	RU		
1978		22	13	3	6	0	0	292	1st	Chris Tavaré 1,335	Derek Underwood 110		28	10th	QF	Won		
1979		22	6	3	13	0	0	181	5th	Chris Tavaré 1,239	Derek Underwood 104		48	2nd	QF	Grp		
1980		22	2	8	12	0	0	119	16th	Chris Tavaré 1,050	Derek Underwood 60		28	11th	R2	Grp		
1981		22	5	7	10	0	0	189	9th	Chris Tavaré 1,502	Kevin Jarvis 79		32	7th	R2	SF		
1982		22	3	4	15	0	0	166	13th	Neil Taylor 1,083	Derek Underwood 78		36	4th	R2	QF		
1983		24	7	4	13	0	0	250	7th	Derek Aslett 1,437	Derek Underwood 105		42	3rd	RU	SF		
1984		24	8	3	11	2	0	254	5th	Derek Aslett 1,231	Derek Underwood 77		28	9th	RU	Grp		
1985		24	4	5	15	0	0	186	9th	Mark Benson 1,446	Derek Underwood 64		30	10th	QF	SF		
1986		24	5	7	12	0	0	197	8th	Mark Benson 1,242	Terry Alderman 98		36	6th	R2	RU		
1987		24	2	7	15	0	0	151	14th	Mark Benson 1,619	Eldine Baptiste 51		38	6th	R2	SF		
1988		22	10	5	7	0	0	289	2nd	Chris Tavaré 1,292	Chris Penn 80		34	7th	QF	Grp		
1989		22	3	8	11	0	0	154	15th	Neil Taylor 1,495	Alan Igglesden 53		28	11th	R2	SF		
1990		22	3	6	13	0	0	152	16th	Neil Taylor 1,752	Richard Davis 65		30	10th	R2	Grp		
1991		22	6	3	12	1	0	209	6th	Neil Taylor 1,647	Tony Merrick 58		28	10th	R2	QF		
1992		22	9	3	10	0	0	259	2nd	Trevor Ward 1,648	Richard Davis 67		40	5th	QF	RU		
1993		17	6	4	7	0	0	190	8th	Carl Hooper 1,304	Alan Igglesden 50		52	2nd	R2	Pre		
1994		17	6	7	4	0	0	198	9th	Carl Hooper 1,579	Min Patel 79		48	3rd	SF	QF		
1995		17	3	10	4	0	0	132	18th	Aravinda de Silva 1,688	Min Patel 51		50	1st (Note: Kent won the title ahead of Warwickshire on runs per 100 balls after tying on points and number of games won.)	R2	RU		
1996		17	9	2	6	0	0	261	4th	Carl Hooper 1,287	Martin McCague 75		34	10th	R2	QF		
1997		17	8	4	5	0	0	252	2nd	Alan Wells 1,055	Paul Strang 61		50	2nd	R1	RU		(Note: Kent's draw with Somerset on 20–23 August 1997 finished with the scores level. As Kent were batting last, the rules during the 1997 season awarded the county eight points (plus bonus points) instead of the usual three (plus bonus points).)
1998		17	5	5	7	0	0	178	11th	Carl Hooper 1,215	Dean Headley 52		38	5th	R2	QF		
1999		17	6	4	7	0	0	194	5th	Andrew Symonds 829	Julian Thompson 64	Div 1	36	3rd	QF	n/a (Note: Owing to the 1999 Cricket World Cup, the Benson & Hedges Cup was replaced by the Benson & Hedges Super Cup, which featured the top eight teams from the 1998 County Championship. Kent, having finished 11th, did not qualify.)		
2000	Div 1	16	4	4	8	0	0	140	6th	Rahul Dravid 1,039	Martin Saggers 57	Div 1	32	5th	R4	Grp		
2001	Div 1	16	4	3	9	0	0	175	3rd	David Fulton 1,729	Martin Saggers 63	Div 1	50	1st	QF	Grp		
2002	Div 1	16	7	4	5	0	0	195.5	3rd	Ed Smith 1,233	Martin Saggers 79	Div 1	30	5th	SF	Grp		
2003	Div 1	16	6	5	5	0	0	198	4th	Ed Smith 1,352	Martin Saggers 54	Div 1	30	6th	R4		Grp	
2004	Div 1	16	7	3	6	0	0	206	2nd	Rob Key 1,274	Min Patel 41	Div 1	24	8th	R3		Grp	
2005	Div 1	16	6	3	7	0	0	202.5	5th	Rob Key 1,556	Min Patel 59	Div 2	28	8th	QF		Grp	
2006	Div 1	16	4	4	8	0	0	175	5th	Matthew Walker 1,419	Amjad Khan 34	Div 2	10	5th	Grp		QF	
2007	Div 1	16	3	5	7	0	1 (Note: Kent's match against Worcestershire at New Road was abandoned without a ball bowled due to the 2007 United Kingdom floods. The game was initially rescheduled for the end of July but later cancelled.)	153	7th	Rob Key 1,250	Ryan McLaren 44	Div 2	10	5th	Grp		Won	
2008	Div 1	16	4	6	6	0	0	154	8th (Note: Relegated to Division 2.)	Martin van Jaarsveld 1,150	Robbie Joseph 55	Div 2	10	4th	RU		RU	
2009	Div 2	16	8	3	5	0	0	219	1st (Note: Promoted to Division 1.)	Martin van Jaarsveld 1,475	James Tredwell 69	Div 2	9	3rd	Grp		SF	
2010	Div 1	16	3	7	6	0	0	151	8th	Martin van Jaarsveld 1,082	Amjad Khan 38				Grp		Grp	
2011	Div 2	16	5	9	2	0	0	149	8th	Joe Denly 1,024	James Tredwell 42				Grp		QF	
2012	Div 2	16	4	3	9	0	0	170	3rd	Brendan Nash 908	Charlie Shreck 55				Grp		Grp	
2013	Div 2	16	3	2	11	0	0	151	7th	Darren Stevens 1,268	Charlie Shreck 33				Grp		Grp	
2014	Div 2	16	4	6	6	0	0	171	6th	Daniel Bell-Drummond 955	Darren Stevens 56				SF		Grp	
2015	Div 2	16	4	7	5	0	0	161	7th	Sam Northeast 1,168	Matt Coles 67				QF		QF	
2016	Div 2	16	5	2	8	0	1 (Note: Kent's match against Worcestershire at New Road was abandoned without a ball bowled due to a water-logged outfield.)	212	2nd (Note: In 2016 only one team was promoted to Division One due to the realignment of the numbers of teams in each division.)	Sam Northeast 1,337	Mitchell Claydon 48				QF		Grp	
2017	Div 2	14	4	2	7	0	1 (Note: Kent's match against Derbyshire at Queen's Park, Chesterfield in September was abandoned without a ball being bowled due to heavy rain and a water-logged outfield.)	175	5th	Joe Denly 1,165	Darren Stevens 62				Grp		Grp	(Note: Kent also competed in the 2016–17 Regional Super50 competition in the West Indies in January and February 2017)
2018	Div 2	14	10	3	1	0	0	221	2nd	Joe Denly 828	Matt Henry 75				RU		QF	(Note: Kent also competed in the 2017–18 Regional Super50 competition in the West Indies in January and February 2018, reaching the semi-finals of the competition.)
2019	Div 1	14	5	5	4	0	0	172	4th	Daniel Bell-Drummond 892	Matt Milnes 55				Grp		Grp	
2020	South (Note: The County Championship was replaced by the Bob Willis Trophy in 2020 due to the COVID-19 pandemic. Kent played in the south group of the competition. The One-Day Cup competition was cancelled.)	5	3	1	1	0	0	82	2nd	Jordan Cox 324	Darren Stevens 29				–		QF	
2021	Div 3 (Note: Due to the ongoing COVID-19 pandemic the County Championship was split into two stages. In the first stage, Kent played against five other teams in Group 3. They finished in the bottom two teams in the group and so moved into Division 3, with the bottom two teams from the other groups, playing four matches, once each against the teams they had not already played. After winning all four matches in the final stage, Kent finished first in Division 3. This is the only time that the County Championship has featured three divisions.)	14	5	5	4	0	0	94	1st	Jack Leaning 745	Darren Stevens 39				Grp		Won	
2022	Div 1	14	4	5	5	0	0	158	5th	Ben Compton 1,193	Nathan Gilchrist 33				Won		Grp	
2023	Div 1	14	2	7	5	0	0	111	8th	Ben Compton 735	Wes Agar 21; Matt Quinn 21				Grp		Grp	
2024	Div 1	14	1	8	5	0	0	99	10th	Daniel Bell-Drummond 853	Matt Parkinson 36				Grp		Grp	
2025	Div 2	14	2	6	6	0	0	114	8th	Ben Compton 1,386	Matt Parkinson 35				Grp		QF	

== Key ==
Winners	Runners up	Promoted	Relegated

Top run scorer/wicket taker shown in bold when he was the leading run scorer/wicket taker in the country.

Key to league record:
Div – division played in
P – games played
W – games won
L – games lost
D – games drawn
Tie – game tied
A – games abandoned
Pts – points
Pos – final position

Key to rounds:
Pre – preliminary round
R1 – first round
R2 – second round, etc.
QF – quarter-final
SF – semi-final
Grp – group stage
RU – runners-up
n/a – not applicable
