= 1967 Gillette Cup final =

1967 Gillette Cup Final
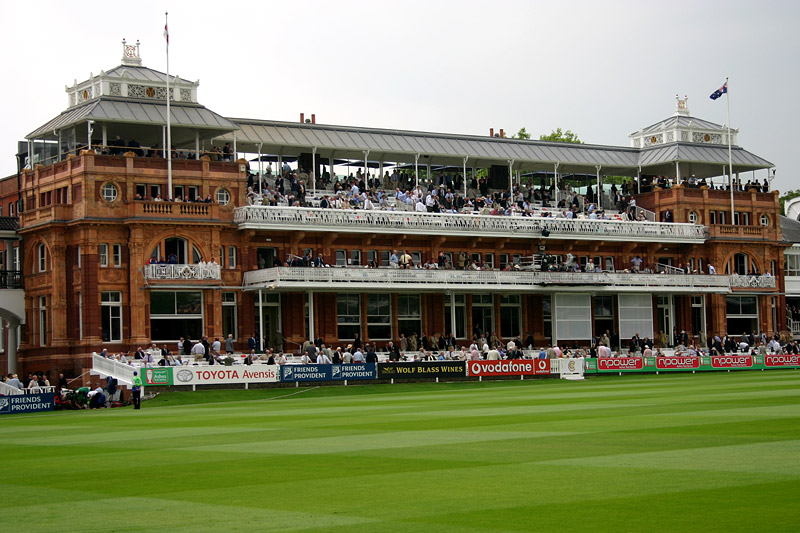
- Event: 1967 Gillette Cup
Kent	Somerset
193	161
59.4 overs	54.5 overs
- Kent won by 32 runs
- Date: 2 September 1967
- Venue: Lord's, London
- Man of the match: Mike Denness (Kent)
- Umpires: Syd Buller and Fred Price

The 1967 Gillette Cup Final was a one-day cricket match between Kent County Cricket Club and Somerset County Cricket Club played on 2 September 1967 at Lord's in London. It was the fifth final of the Gillette Cup, the first English domestic knock-out competition between first-class teams. Both teams were making their first appearance in the final. Kent were regarded as pre-match favourites given their good form all season, in both one-day and first-class cricket.

Kent won the toss and chose to bat first. Both opening batsmen, Mike Denness and Brian Luckhurst scored half-centuries to help them score 193 runs. They were bowled out with two balls of their innings remaining; Roy Palmer and Bill Alley took three wickets each for Somerset. When Somerset batted, a few players made good starts, but none managed to make half-centuries or above. Peter Robinson achieved their highest score, with 48 runs. The county were eventually dismissed for 161, granting Kent victory by 32 runs. The victory was the start of a successful period of cricket for Kent, who won eleven trophies between 1967 and 1979.

== Background ==
The Gillette Cup was introduced in 1963 in response to falling crowds at County Championship matches. The competition was designed to replicate first-class cricket as much as possible, but allow for a game to be completed, with a result, in one day. The finals in both 1963 and 1964 were sold out, demonstrating the success of the competition.

Neither Kent nor Somerset had won the Gillette Cup during its four-year history. Somerset had been losing semi-finalists during the 1966 competition, while Kent had never before made it beyond the second round of the tournament. If Kent won, it would be their first competition victory since the 1928 County Championship, while Somerset had never before won a county tournament. In his preview of the match for The Times, John Woodcock opined that Kent were the favourites, as long as they could cope with Bill Alley, the Somerset all-rounder. Kent were in the midst of a successful 1967 season, and started the day with the prospect of winning not only the Gillette Cup, but also the County Championship. They sat atop the Championship table with 176 points, though Yorkshire could secure the trophy with points from their final match of the season.

== Route to the final ==
Kent received a first round bye, and joined the competition in the second round, facing Essex. Kent batted first and posted a total of 239 for eight, aided by scores of 66 from both Colin Cowdrey and Brian Luckhurst. During Essex's reply, Norman Graham bowled well to take four wickets and restrict the opposing batsmen to 19 runs from his 12 overs, helping Kent to a 42-run victory. In their quarter-final match against Surrey, Alan Dixon took seven wickets for 15 runs, while Graham and John Shepherd also bowled economically to bowl Surrey out for 74 runs. Writing for The Times, A. A. Thomson opined that although Dixon's bowling was "magnificent", the opposition batting was equally poor. In a facile chase, Kent lost four wickets, but reached their winning total in less than half the available overs to win by six wickets. In their semi final against Sussex, good batting performances from Luckhurst, Shepherd and Cowdrey helped Kent to a total of 293 for five. In response, Sussex were bowled out for 175. The wickets were shared amongst the Kent bowlers, but Alan Brown and Derek Underwood were particularly miserly.

Unlike Kent, Somerset did feature in the first round, in which they faced Leicestershire. Mervyn Kitchen and Graham Burgess each batted well to propel Somerset to a score of 251 for nine. Leicestershire were then bowled out for 160 runs after just 46.3 overs, giving Somerset a 91-run victory. Somerset's second round match against Warwickshire, in Birmingham, took three days to complete. Somerset batted first again, and scored 206 for eight. No batsmen particularly stood out; Roy Virgin, Bill Alley and Colin Atkinson all made scores in the forties, while Kitchen scored 35, and no other batsman reached double figures. Warwickshire then reached 84 for four just short of halfway through their overs when the game was postponed due to inclement weather. Cricket at the time was not played on Sundays, and no further play was possible on Monday, so the game continued on Tuesday, when economical bowling from Fred Rumsey, along with the wickets taken by Alley on the first day, helped to restrict Warwickshire to 181 runs. Somerset batted first again in their quarter final match against Northamptonshire, but only managed to score 184 runs. No Somerset player managed to score more than 40 runs during the innings. The Somerset bowlers played well in comparison; Rumsey took four wickets, while Alley conceded only eight runs from his twelve overs, and Northamptonshire were bowled out for 148. Somerset once again had no stand-out batting performance in their semi-final; Kitchen was their highest scorer with 40 runs, as they posted 210 for seven in a rain-interrupted innings which continued into the second day of the match. Three of the Somerset bowlers, Ken Palmer, Rumsey and Alley all conceded less than two runs per over to help their team limit Lancashire to 110 runs, and give Somerset a 100-run victory.

== Match ==
=== Summary ===
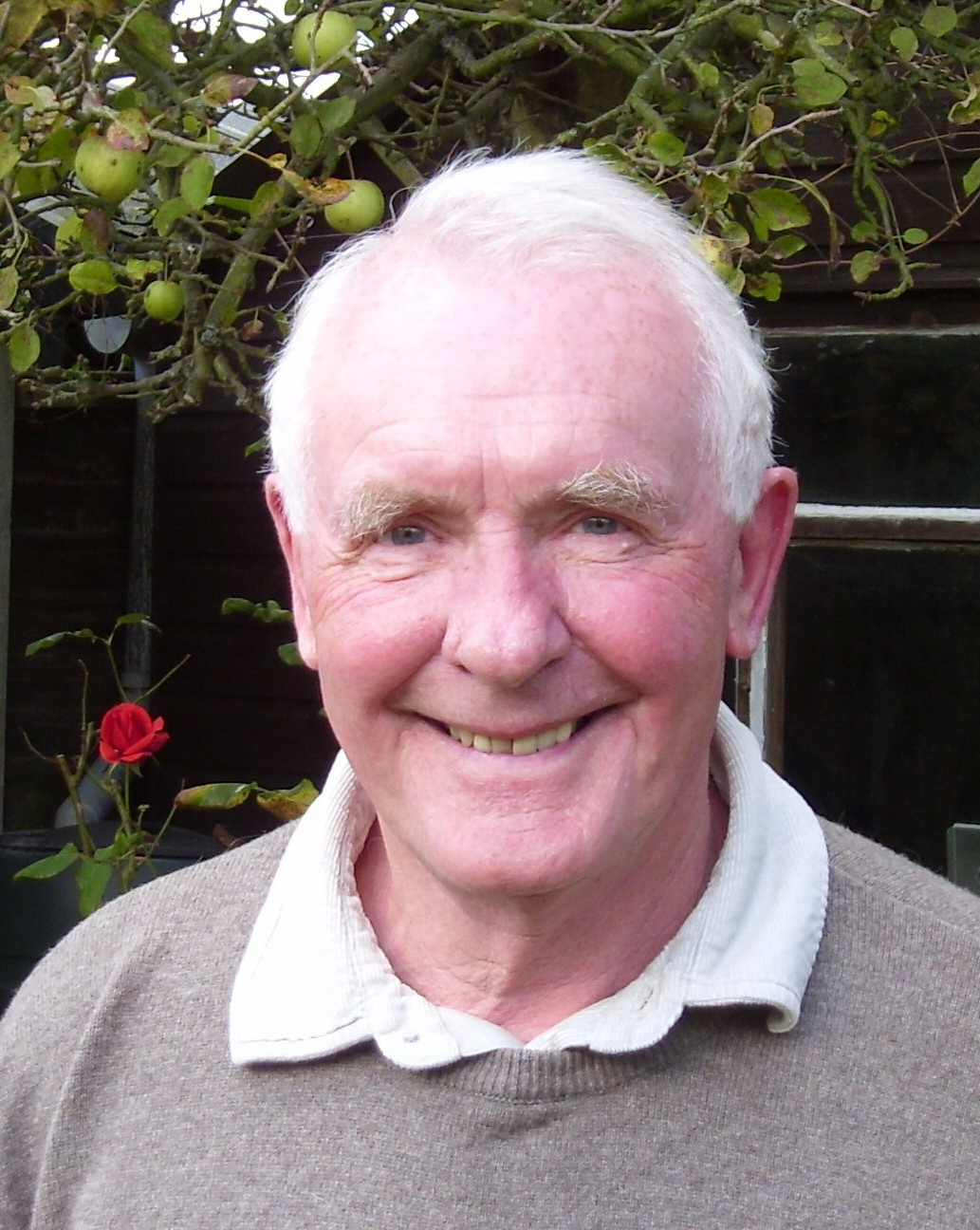
Mike Denness, pictured in 2008, won the man of the match award for his quick 50 runs to open the Kent batting.

Played in front of a sell-out crowd of 20,000 people at Lord's, Kent captain Colin Cowdrey won the toss and chose to bat first. Mike Denness and Brian Luckhurst opened the batting for Kent. Denness began by scoring quickly, accounting for 50 of the team's 78 runs after just over an hour of the match, before being caught behind by Geoff Clayton off the bowling of Bill Alley. John Woodcock, writing in The Times described Denness' contribution as being "the one innings of quality" in an "ordinary" match. Luckhurst played a patient innings, and shared a second-wicket partnership of 60 with Shepherd. Once their top-order batsmen were out, Kent collapsed from 138 runs for the loss of one wicket to 150 for seven. Cowdrey, Dixon, Stuart Leary and Alan Brown were all dismissed for scores of one or less. A late partnership between Alan Knott and Alan Ealham, who scored 21 and 17 respectively before both were run out, helped to push Kent's score on to 193 all out after 59.4 overs, two deliveries short of the full 60-over innings. Somerset's bowling was led by Alley, who took three wickets and conceded 22 runs from his 12 overs. Woodcock described his bowling during the match as being of "the utmost cunning". Somerset's other bowlers fared less well; Roy Palmer also collected three wickets, but was expensive, conceding nearly five runs per over.

In Somerset's batting innings, Woodcock suggested that the team needed just one top-class performance to grant them victory after restricting Kent's score well late in their innings. Peter Robinson, opening with Roy Virgin, played well to score 48 runs, but that was the highest score that any Somerset player would manage. Each of the other top-order batsmen made starts, but none could convert them to big scores; Virgin got 17, Mervyn Kitchen 15 and Terry Barwell 24. Alley, identified by The Times as a key player for Somerset before the match, only scored one run before being caught behind square on the legside by Brown from the bowling of Shepherd. Graham Burgess provided some runs in the middle-order, but lacked support from his batting partners; of the five batsmen who were below him in the batting order, only Geoff Clayton added more than two runs to the score, and he only totalled eight. Derek Underwood finished as Kent's leading wicket-taker in the match, though his three wickets came late in the innings, as he had been held back against the top-order, as Cowdrey was concerned he might concede too many runs. Somerset were all out for 161 runs, with 54.5 overs bowled, giving Kent a 32-run victory.

=== Scorecard ===
- Toss: Kent won the toss and elected to bat first
- Result: Kent won by 32 runs

Kent batting innings
Batsman	Method of dismissal	Runs
Mike Denness	c Geoff Clayton † b Bill Alley	50
Brian Luckhurst	c Colin Atkinson b Bill Alley	54
John Shepherd	c Roy Virgin b Fred Rumsey	30
Colin Cowdrey *	c Peter Robinson b Ken Palmer	1
Alan Knott †	run out	21
Alan Dixon	b Bill Alley	0
Stuart Leary	c Geoff Clayton † b Roy Palmer	1
Alan Brown	c Terry Barwell b Roy Palmer	1
Alan Ealham	run out	17
Derek Underwood	b Roy Palmer	7
Norman Graham	not out	0
Extras	(1 bye, 8 leg byes, 2 no-balls)	11
Totals	(59.4 overs, 3.23 runs per over)	193

Somerset bowling
Bowler	Overs	Maidens	Runs	Wickets	Economy
Fred Rumsey	12	1	28	1	2.33
Ken Palmer	12	3	37	1	3.08
Roy Palmer	10.4	0	53	3	4.96
Bill Alley	12	4	22	3	1.83
Colin Atkinson	7	1	25	0	3.57
Graham Burgess	6	2	17	0	2.83

Somerset batting innings
Batsman	Method of dismissal	Runs
Roy Virgin	c Norman Graham b Alan Dixon	17
Peter Robinson	c Alan Knott † b John Shepherd	48
Mervyn Kitchen	c & b Alan Dixon	15
Terry Barwell	run out	24
Bill Alley	c Alan Brown b John Shepherd	8
Graham Burgess	c Alan Knott † b Alan Brown	27
Colin Atkinson *	c Brian Luckhurst b Derek Underwood	1
Geoff Clayton	b Derek Underwood	8
Ken Palmer	c Brian Luckhurst b Derek Underwood	0
Roy Palmer	c Stuart Leary b Norman Graham	2
Fred Rumsey	not out	1
Extras	(8 leg byes, 2 no-balls)	10
Totals	(54.5 overs, 2.93 runs per over)	161

Kent bowling
Bowler	Overs	Maidens	Runs	Wickets	Economy
Norman Graham	12	4	26	1	2.16
Alan Brown	9.5	3	20	1	2.03
Derek Underwood	10	2	41	3	4.10
John Shepherd	12	2	27	2	2.25
Alan Dixon	11	2	37	2	3.36

Umpires:

- Syd Buller and Fred Price

Key

- * – Captain
- † – Wicket-keeper
- c Fielder – Indicates that the batsman was dismissed by a catch by the named fielder
- b Bowler – Indicates which bowler gains credit for the dismissal

== Aftermath ==
Denness was selected by Bill Edrich, a former England Test cricketer, as the man of the match. Kent missed out on a double, as Yorkshire won their final match of the season to claim the County Championship title, but their Gillette Cup win was the first of eleven trophies between 1967 and 1979; they won the competition again in 1974, the County Championship in 1970, 1977 and 1978, the John Player League in 1972, 1973 and 1976, and the Benson & Hedges Cup in 1973, 1976 and 1978. They were also runners-up seven times in that period, including in the 1971 Gillette Cup Final. Somerset were less successful, and did not reach another final until they finished as runners-up in the 1978 Gillette Cup Final, before winning the competition the following season.
