= 1899 English cricket season =

Cricket season review

The 1899 English cricket season featured the tenth edition of the County Championship. Surrey won the championship for the first time in four years, but this title was their last until 1914. Surrey's season was dominated by draws, with fourteen out of 26 games drawn, just like the season in general – especially the Australian team's tour. Four of the five Test matches were drawn during the 19th series between the teams, but Australia won the second Test at Lord's and the series 1–0. This was their first Ashes series win in England since the original match in 1882.

Also, Worcestershire became the fifteenth county in the County Championship, debuting with an 11-run loss to Yorkshire despite earning a 78-run lead on first innings. George Wilson took eight for 70 in the first innings, which was a Worcestershire Championship record until Wilson beat it against Somerset in 1905. The debutants finished twelfth, though they only earned two wins in 12 games. Finally, Sussex' Ranjitsinhji became the first batsman to hit 2000 runs in a Championship season with 102 against Lancashire in August.

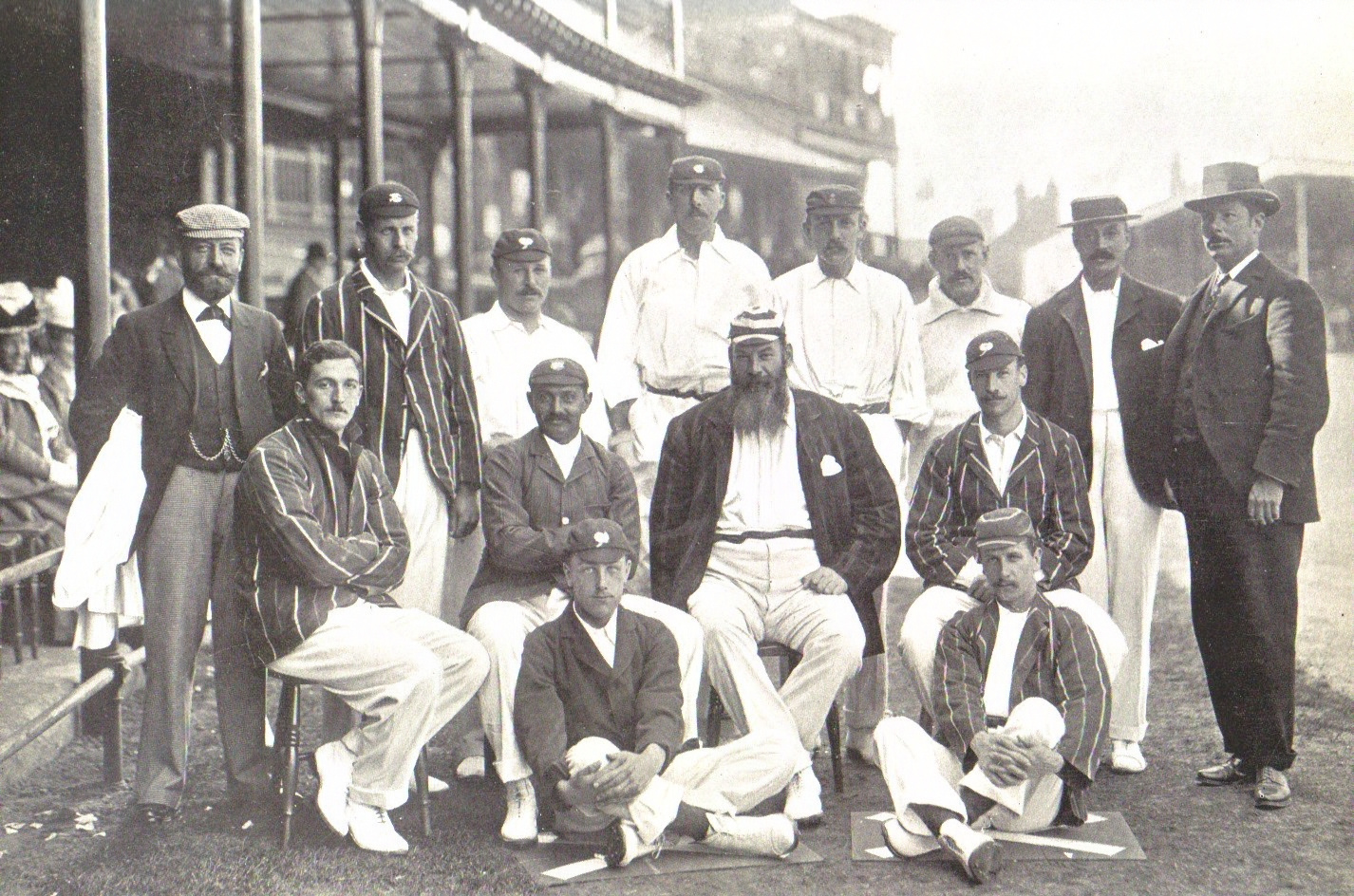
England team v. Australia, Trent Bridge 1899. Back row: Dick Barlow (umpire), Tom Hayward, George Hirst, Billy Gunn, J T Hearne (12th man), Bill Storer (wkt kpr), Bill Brockwell, V A Titchmarsh (umpire). Middle row: C B Fry, K S Ranjitsinhji, W G Grace (captain), Stanley Jackson. Front row: Wilfred Rhodes, Johnny Tyldesley.

The season was a notable one for WG Grace. The First Test marked his final appearance for England (and the Test debut of Wilfred Rhodes). Also Grace played his last Championship game for Gloucestershire, having fallen out with them over his involvement with London County.

== Honours ==
- County Championship – Surrey
- Minor Counties Championship – Buckinghamshire, Northamptonshire (shared title)
- Wisden (Five Cricketers of the Season) – Joe Darling, Clem Hill, Arthur Jones, Monty Noble, Robert Poore

== Ashes tour ==
Cumulative record - Test wins	1876–1899
England	26
Australia	20
Drawn	10

== County Championship ==
=== Final table ===
County Championship 1899 – Final Standings
	Team	P	W	L	D	A	Pts	GC^{1}	Pts/GC (as %)
1	Surrey	26	10	2	14	0	8	12	66.67
2	Middlesex	18	11	3	4	0	8	14	57.14
3	Yorkshire	28	14	4	10	0	10	18	55.56
4	Lancashire	26	12	6	7	1	6	18	33.33
5	Sussex	22	7	5	10	0	2	12	16.67
6	Essex	20	6	6	8	0	0	12	0.00
7	Warwickshire	20	4	5	11	0	−1	9	−11.11
8	Kent	20	6	8	5	1	−2	14	−14.29
9	Gloucestershire	20	5	8	7	0	−3	13	−23.08
10	Hampshire	20	4	8	8	0	−4	12	−33.33
10	Nottinghamshire	16	2	4	10	0	−2	6	−33.33
12	Worcestershire	12	2	5	5	0	−3	7	−42.86
13	Leicestershire	18	2	8	8	0	−6	10	−60.00
13	Somerset	16	2	8	6	0	−6	10	−60.00
15	Derbyshire	18	2	9	7	0	−7	11	−63.64

- ^{1} Games completed

Points system:

- 1 for a win
- 0 for a draw, a tie or an abandoned match
- -1 for a loss

=== Most runs in the County Championship ===
1899 County Championship – leading batsmen
Name	Team	Matches	Runs	Average	100s	50s
Ranjitsinhji	Sussex	20	2285	76.16	7	10
Bobby Abel	Surrey	26	2134	64.66	5	11
Tom Hayward	Surrey	23	1798	64.21	4	10
Charlie Townsend	Gloucestershire	19	1694	56.46	7	3
Johnny Tyldesley	Lancashire	23	1584	41.68	2	10

=== Most wickets in the County Championship ===
1899 County Championship – leading bowlers
Name	Team	Matches	Balls bowled	Wickets taken	Average
Albert Trott	Middlesex	20	5290	146	15.69
Wilfred Rhodes	Yorkshire	26	5417	129	15.66
Arthur Paish	Gloucestershire	24	5151	125	18.93
Walter Mead	Essex	18	5226	112	17.12
Bill Bradley	Kent	21	4486	112	18.77

== Overall first-class statistics ==
=== Leading batsmen ===
1899 English cricket season – leading batsmen
Name	Team(s)	Matches	Runs	Average	100s	50s
Ranjitsinhji	England, Gentlemen, Marylebone Cricket Club (MCC), South of England, Sussex	34	3159	63.18	8	17
Bobby Abel	Players, South of England, Surrey	35	2685	53.70	7	12
Tom Hayward	England, Players, South of England, Surrey	35	2647	58.82	7	13
Charlie Townsend	England, Gentlemen, Gloucestershire, Marylebone Cricket Club (MCC), South of England	30	2440	51.91	9	6
CB Fry	England, Gentlemen, South of England, Sussex	31	2366	43.81	5	13

=== Leading bowlers ===
1899 English cricket season – leading bowlers
Name	Team(s)	Matches	Balls bowled	Wickets taken	Average
Albert Trott	England, Marylebone Cricket Club (MCC), Middlesex, Players	32	8796	239	17.09
Wilfred Rhodes	England, Players, Yorkshire	34	7595	179	17.10
Bill Bradley	England, Gentlemen, Kent, South of England	25	6285	156	19.10
Walter Mead	England, Essex, Marylebone Cricket Club (MCC), Players	28	6887	146	18.04
Hugh Trumble	Australia	32	6224	142	18.43

== Annual reviews ==
- James Lillywhite's Cricketers' Annual (Red Lilly), Lillywhite, 1900
- Wisden Cricketers' Almanack 1900
