= 1899 County Championship =

English cricket tournament

- Cricket format: First-class cricket (3 days)
- Tournament format: League system
- Champions: Surrey (6th title)
- Participants: 15
- Matches: 150
- Most runs: K. S. Ranjitsinhji (2,285 for Sussex)
- Most wickets: Albert Trott (146 for Middlesex)

The 1899 County Championship was the tenth officially organised running of the County Championship, and ran from 1 May to 6 September 1899. Surrey County Cricket Club won their sixth championship title, with Middlesex finishing as runners-up for the second season in a row. Worcestershire were admitted to the Championship, increasing the number of counties with first-class status to 15.

== Table ==
- One point was awarded for a win, and one point was taken away for each loss. Final placings were decided by dividing the number of points earned by the number of completed matches (i.e. those that ended in a win or a loss), and multiplying by 100.

| Team | Pld | W | L | D | A | Pts | Fin | %Fin |
|---|---|---|---|---|---|---|---|---|
| Surrey | 26 | 10 | 2 | 14 | 0 | 8 | 12 | 66.67 |
| Middlesex | 18 | 11 | 3 | 4 | 0 | 8 | 14 | 57.14 |
| Yorkshire | 28 | 14 | 4 | 10 | 0 | 10 | 18 | 55.56 |
| Lancashire | 26 | 12 | 6 | 7 | 1 | 6 | 18 | 33.33 |
| Sussex | 22 | 7 | 5 | 10 | 0 | 2 | 12 | 16.67 |
| Essex | 20 | 6 | 6 | 8 | 0 | 0 | 12 | 0.00 |
| Warwickshire | 20 | 4 | 5 | 11 | 0 | –1 | 9 | –11.11 |
| Kent | 20 | 6 | 8 | 5 | 1 | –2 | 14 | –14.29 |
| Gloucestershire | 20 | 5 | 8 | 7 | 0 | –3 | 13 | –23.08 |
| Hampshire | 20 | 4 | 8 | 8 | 0 | –4 | 12 | –33.33 |
| Nottinghamshire | 16 | 2 | 4 | 10 | 0 | –2 | 6 | –33.33 |
| Worcestershire | 12 | 2 | 5 | 5 | 0 | –3 | 7 | –42.86 |
| Leicestershire | 18 | 2 | 8 | 8 | 0 | –6 | 10 | –60.00 |
| Somerset | 16 | 2 | 8 | 6 | 0 | –6 | 10 | –60.00 |
| Derbyshire | 18 | 2 | 9 | 7 | 0 | –7 | 11 | –63.64 |
Source: CricketArchive

== Records ==
Most runs
| Aggregate | Average | Player | County |
|---|---|---|---|
| 2,285 | 76.16 | K. S. Ranjitsinhji | Sussex |
| 2,134 | 64.66 | Bobby Abel | Surrey |
| 1,798 | 64.21 | Tom Hayward | Surrey |
| 1,694 | 56.46 | Charlie Townsend | Gloucestershire |
| 1,584 | 41.68 | Johnny Tyldesley | Lancashire |

Most wickets
| Aggregate | Average | Player | County |
|---|---|---|---|
| 146 | 15.69 | Albert Trott | Middlesex |
| 129 | 15.66 | Wilfred Rhodes | Yorkshire |
| 125 | 18.93 | Arthur Paish | Gloucestershire |
| 112 | 17.12 | Walter Mead | Essex |
| 112 | 18.77 | Bill Bradley | Kent |
