= International cricket in 1974 =

International cricket season

The 1974 international cricket season extended from May to September 1974.

== Season overview ==
International tours
Start date	Home team	Away team	Results [Matches]			
Start date	Home team	Away team	Test	ODI	FC	LA
6 June 1974	England	India	3–0 [3]	2–0 [2]	—	—
21 June 1974	Netherlands	Ireland	—	—	0–1 [1]	—
25 July 1974	England	Pakistan	0–0 [3]	0–2 [2]	—	—

== June ==
=== India in England ===
Test series
No.	Date	Home captain	Away captain	Venue	Result
Test 739	6–11 June	Mike Denness	Ajit Wadekar	Old Trafford Cricket Ground, Manchester	England by 113 runs
Test 740	20–24 June	Mike Denness	Ajit Wadekar	Lord's, London	England by an innings and 285 runs
Test 741	4–8 June	Mike Denness	Ajit Wadekar	Edgbaston Cricket Ground, Birmingham	England by an innings and 78 runs
Prudential Trophy ODI series
No.	Date	Home captain	Away captain	Venue	Result
ODI 12	13 July	Mike Denness	Ajit Wadekar	Headingley, Leeds	England by 4 wickets
ODI 13	15–16 July	Mike Denness	Ajit Wadekar	Kennington Oval, London	England by 6 wickets

=== Ireland in Holland ===
Test series
No.	Date	Home captain	Away captain	Venue	Result
FC Match	21–23 June	GWA van Laer	AJ Linehan	ACC Ground, Amstelveen	Ireland by 3 wickets

== July ==
=== Pakistan in England ===
Test series
No.	Date	Home captain	Away captain	Venue	Result
Test 742	25–30 July	Mike Denness	Intikhab Alam	Headingley, Leeds	Match drawn
Test 743	8–13 August	Mike Denness	Intikhab Alam	Lord's, London	Match drawn
Test 744	22–27 August	Mike Denness	Intikhab Alam	Kennington Oval, London	Match drawn
Prudential Trophy ODI series
No.	Date	Home captain	Away captain	Venue	Result
ODI 14	31 August	Mike Denness	Intikhab Alam	Trent Bridge, Nottingham	Pakistan by 7 wickets
ODI 15	3 September	Mike Denness	Intikhab Alam	Edgbaston Cricket Ground, Birmingham	Pakistan by 8 wickets
