= Paish =

Paish is a surname. Notable people with the surname include:

- Arthur Paish (1874–1948), British cricketer
- Geoffrey Paish (1922-2008), British tennis player
- George Paish (1867-1957), British economist
- John Paish (born 1948), British tennis player
- Wilf Paish (1932-2010), British athletic coach
