= 1964 English cricket season =

1964 was the 65th season of County Championship cricket in England. Australia retained The Ashes as Bob Simpson led them through a hard-fought series, with only one match coming to a definite result. In domestic cricket, Worcestershire won the County Championship for the first time and Sussex retained the Gillette Cup List A competition.

== Honours ==
- County Championship – Worcestershire
- Gillette Cup – Sussex
- Minor Counties Championship – Lancashire II
- Second XI Championship – Lancashire II
- Wisden (for their deeds in 1964) - Geoffrey Boycott, Peter Burge, Jack Flavell, Graham McKenzie, Bob Simpson

== Test series ==
Australia retained the Ashes by beating England 1–0. Australia won the Third Test at Headingley and the other four were all drawn. In the match that Australia won, they were 187–7 in reply to England's 268 when Ted Dexter decided to take the new ball. In response, Peter Burge, the last recognised batsman, went on the attack. He scored 160, well supported by Neil Hawke and Wally Grout, and the last three wickets added 211. 121 behind on first innings, England could not recover. Since a draw in the Fourth Test at Old Trafford would ensure that Australia would retain the Ashes, they batted on until they had reached 656–8 before declaring, with Bobby Simpson scoring 311, his first Test century. England responded with 611 (Ken Barrington 256, Ted Dexter 174) and the match ended in the dullest of draws.

Cumulative record – Test wins	1876–1964
England	64
Australia	78
Drawn	51

== Leading batsmen ==
1964 English cricket season – leading batsmen by average
Name	Innings	Runs	Highest	Average	100s
Ken Barrington	35	1872	256	62.40	4
Bob Simpson	38	1714	311	57.13	5
Brian Booth	36	1551	193*	55.39	3
Colin Cowdrey	37	1763	117	55.09	4
Tom Graveney	51	2385	164	54.20	5
Geoff Boycott	44	2110	177	52.75	6
Bob Cowper	29	1287	113	51.48	3
Mickey Stewart	44	1980	227*	50.76	6

1964 English cricket season – leading batsmen by aggregate
Name	Innings	Runs	Highest	Average	100s
Tom Graveney	51	2385	164	54.20	5
Eric Russell	56	2342	193	45.92	5
Mike Brearley	54	2178	169	44.44	5
Geoff Boycott	44	2110	177	52.75	6
Bob Wilson	49	2038	156	46.31	4

== Leading bowlers ==
1964 English cricket season – leading bowlers by average
Name	Balls	Maidens	Runs	Wickets	Average
Jim Standen	2534	131	832	64	13.00
Len Coldwell	4417	211	1518	98	15.48
Tony Nicholson	3490	159	1193	76	15.69
Tom Cartwright	6878	502	2141	134	15.97
Ian Thomson	5543	293	1891	116	16.30

1964 English cricket season – leading bowlers by aggregate
Name	Balls	Maidens	Runs	Wickets	Average
Derek Shackleton	8568	568	2897	142	20.40
Roger Harman	6787	385	2858	136	21.01
Tom Cartwright	6878	502	2141	134	15.97
Fred Titmus	6813	441	2106	123	17.12
Ray Illingworth	6074	374	2131	122	17.46
Alan Dixon	6700	306	2915	122	23.89

== Annual reviews ==
- Playfair Cricket Annual 1965
- Wisden Cricketers' Almanack 1965
