= International cricket in 1974–75 =

International cricket season

The 1974–75 international cricket season was from September 1974 to April 1975.

== Season overview ==
International tours
Start date	Home team	Away team	Results [Matches]			
Start date	Home team	Away team	Test	ODI	FC	LA
22 November 1974	India	West Indies	2–3 [5]	—	—	—
29 November 1974	Australia	England	4–1 [6]	0–1 [1]	—	—
20 February 1975	New Zealand	England	0–1 [2]	0–0 [2]	—	—
15 March 1975	Pakistan	West Indies	0–0 [2]	—	—	—

== November ==
=== West Indies in India ===
Test series
No.	Date	Home captain	Away captain	Venue	Result
Test 745	22–27 November	Mansoor Ali Khan Pataudi	Clive Lloyd	Karnataka State Cricket Association Stadium, Bangalore	West Indies by 267 runs
Test 747	11–15 December	Srinivas Venkataraghavan	Clive Lloyd	Feroz Shah Kotla Ground, Delhi	West Indies by an innings and 17 runs
Test 750	27 Dec–1 January	Mansoor Ali Khan Pataudi	Clive Lloyd	Eden Gardens, Calcutta	India by 85 runs
Test 752	11–15 January	Mansoor Ali Khan Pataudi	Clive Lloyd	MA Chidambaram Stadium, Madras	India by 100 runs
Test 753	23–29 February	Mansoor Ali Khan Pataudi	Clive Lloyd	Wankhede Stadium, Bombay	West Indies by 201 runs

=== England in Australia ===
The Ashes Test series
No.	Date	Home captain	Away captain	Venue	Result
Test 746	29 Nov–4 December	Ian Chappell	Mike Denness	The Gabba, Brisbane	Australia by 166 runs
Test 748	13–17 December	Ian Chappell	Mike Denness	WACA Ground, Perth	Australia by 9 wickets
Test 749	26–31 December	Ian Chappell	Mike Denness	Melbourne Cricket Ground, Melbourne	Match drawn
Test 751	4–9 January	Ian Chappell	John Edrich	Sydney Cricket Ground, Sydney	Australia by 171 runs
Test 754	25–30 January	Ian Chappell	Mike Denness	Adelaide Oval, Adelaide	Australia by 163 runs
Test 755	8–13 February	Ian Chappell	Mike Denness	Melbourne Cricket Ground, Melbourne	England by an innings and 4 runs
One-off ODI Match
No.	Date	Home captain	Away captain	Venue	Result
ODI 16	1 January	Ian Chappell	Mike Denness	Melbourne Cricket Ground, Melbourne	England by 3 wickets

== February ==
=== England in New Zealand ===
Test series
No.	Date	Home captain	Away captain	Venue	Result
Test 757	20–25 February	Bevan Congdon	Mike Denness	Eden Park, Auckland	England by an innings and 83 runs
Test 758	28 Feb–5 March	Bevan Congdon	Mike Denness	Lancaster Park, Christchurch	Match drawn
ODI series
No.	Date	Home captain	Away captain	Venue	Result
ODI 17	8 March	Bevan Congdon	John Edrich	Carisbrook, Dunedin	No result
ODI 18	9 March	Bevan Congdon	John Edrich	Basin Reserve, Wellington	No result

== March ==
=== West Indies in Pakistan ===
Test series
No.	Date	Home captain	Away captain	Venue	Result
Test 756	15–20 March	Intikhab Alam	Clive Lloyd	Gaddafi Stadium, Lahore	Match drawn
Test 759	1–6 March	Intikhab Alam	Clive Lloyd	National Stadium, Karachi	Match drawn
