= International cricket in 1968 =

International cricket season

The 1968 International cricket season was from May 1968 to August 1968.

== Season overview ==
International tours
Start date	Home team	Away team	Results [Matches]			
Start date	Home team	Away team	Test	ODI	FC	LA
6 June 1968	England	Australia	1–1 [5]	—	—	—
27 July 1968	Netherlands	M.C.C.	—	—	0–1 [1]	—
21 August 1968	England	World XI	—	—	—	—

== June ==
=== Australia in England ===
The Ashes Test series
No.	Date	Home captain	Away captain	Venue	Result
Test 637	6–11 June	Colin Cowdrey	Bill Lawry	Old Trafford Cricket Ground, Manchester	Australia by 159 runs
Test 638	20–25 June	Colin Cowdrey	Bill Lawry	Lord's, London	Match drawn
Test 639	11–16 July	Colin Cowdrey	Bill Lawry	Edgbaston Cricket Ground, Birmingham	Match drawn
Test 640	25–30 July	Tom Graveney	Barry Jarman	Headingley Cricket Ground, Leeds	Match drawn
Test 641	22–27 August	Colin Cowdrey	Bill Lawry	Kennington Oval, London	England by 226 runs

== July ==
=== MCC in Netherlands ===
First-class match
No.	Date	Home captain	Away captain	Venue	Result
FC Match	27–28 July	Chris van Schouwenburg	Arthur Bailey	Sportpark Koninklijke HFC, Haarlem	M.C.C. by 7 wickets

== August ==
=== World XI in England ===
First-class series
No.	Date	Home captain	Away captain	Venue	Result
Match 01	21–23 August	(Hampshire) Roy Marshall	Mansoor Ali Khan Pataudi	Dean Park, Bournemouth	Hampshire by 68 runs
Match 03	24–27 August	(Kent) Alan Dixon	Hanif Mohammad	St Lawrence Ground, Canterbury	Rest of the World XI by 5 wickets
Match 01	31 Aug–3 September	(Australia) Bill Lawry	Mansoor Ali Khan Pataudi	Lord's, London	Australia by 8 wickets
Match 06	4–6 September	(England) Brian Close	Garfield Sobers	North Marine Road Ground, Scarborough	England 133 runs
