= Rest of the World cricket team in England in 1970 =

International cricket tour

In the 1970 English cricket season, a scheduled South African tour was cancelled for political reasons. As this meant there would be no international cricket in England that season, a Rest of the World team was assembled to play a series of five-day matches against England. At the time, they were played as Test matches, but that status was later revoked by the International Cricket Conference (ICC) and they are now termed unofficial Tests, though still officially first-class matches.

The World XI, captained by Garfield Sobers, convincingly won the first Test by an innings. While the other four matches were more keenly contested, the series result was a 4–1 win by the World XI.

== Background ==
South Africa, who had just defeated Australia four-nil in a home series, were due to tour England during the 1970 season. The controversy created by the D'Oliveira affair in 1968 had escalated in the meantime with increasing opposition to the South African government's apartheid policy. A "Stop The Seventy Tour" campaign was started, its leaders including Gordon Brown and Peter Hain, and a South African rugby tour in early 1970 was disrupted by protests at many of its matches. Prominent opponents of apartheid within cricket included John Arlott, Mike Brearley and David Sheppard, but a vote among members of the Cricketers' Association indicated widespread support for continued sporting links with South Africa. Wisden Cricketers' Almanack described the situation in terms of "a bitter, emotional – sometimes hysterical – aura hanging over English cricket and dividing the nation".

The Test and County Cricket Board (TCCB), who ran English cricket at the time, received a request from Home Secretary James Callaghan to cancel the tour "on grounds of broad public policy". The TCCB reluctantly agreed and the invitation to the South African team was withdrawn. This meant there would be no international cricket in England in 1970 with a concomitant loss of revenue and so, at very short notice, a Rest of the World team was formed, including five South African players. Another two South Africans, Tony Greig and Basil D'Oliveira, who were resident in England, played for the home team. Guinness agreed to sponsor the tour and the County Championship clubs agreed to release any of their contracted players who were selected to play for either England or the World XI.

The England v. Rest of the World XI series was initially recognised as a Test series by Wisden Cricketers' Almanack, but the International Cricket Conference (ICC) stated at their 1972 meeting that the games should not be regarded as official Test matches. Wisden continued to include the matches as Tests until removing them for the 1980 edition against the wishes of the editor, Norman Preston.

== Rest of the World squad ==
Rest of the World, captained by Garfield Sobers, selected 14 players in the series including five South Africans who, despite apartheid at home, were happy to play alongside five West Indians and three players from the Indian sub-continent. Several players were already active in England as contracted members of County Championship clubs. Squad details below state the player's age at the beginning of the 1970 season, his batting hand, his type of bowling, his national team and where applicable his county club.

| Name | Birth date | Country | Batting style | Bowling style | Ref. |
|---|---|---|---|---|---|
| Garfield Sobers (c) | 28 July 1936 (aged 33) | West Indies | Left-handed | All left arm styles | |
| Eddie Barlow | 12 August 1940 (aged 29) | South Africa | Right-handed | Right arm medium pace | |
| Farokh Engineer | 25 February 1938 (aged 32) | India | Right-handed | Wicket-keeper | |
| Lance Gibbs | 29 September 1934 (aged 35) | West Indies | Right-handed | Right arm off break | |
| Intikhab Alam | 28 December 1941 (aged 28) | Pakistan | Right-handed | Right arm leg break | |
| Rohan Kanhai | 26 December 1935 (aged 34) | West Indies | Right-handed | Right arm medium pace | |
| Clive Lloyd | 31 August 1944 (aged 25) | West Indies | Left-handed | Right arm medium pace | |
| Graham McKenzie | 24 June 1941 (aged 28) | Australia | Right-handed | Right arm fast | |
| Deryck Murray | 20 May 1943 (aged 26) | West Indies | Right-handed | Wicket-keeper | |
| Mushtaq Mohammad | 22 November 1943 (aged 26) | Pakistan | Right-handed | Right arm leg break | |
| Graeme Pollock | 27 February 1944 (aged 26) | South Africa | Left-handed | Right arm leg break | |
| Peter Pollock | 30 June 1941 (aged 28) | South Africa | Right-handed | Right arm fast | |
| Mike Procter | 15 September 1946 (aged 23) | South Africa | Right-handed | Right arm fast | |
| Barry Richards | 21 July 1945 (aged 24) | South Africa | Right-handed | Right arm off break | |

== England selections ==
England selected 21 players for the series. All except Alan Jones played in official Test matches in other series and Jones is the only man in cricketing history to win a Test cap and then lose it. Other England debutants were Tony Greig, Peter Lever, Brian Luckhurst, Chris Old and Ken Shuttleworth. The details for each player below state his age at the beginning of the 1970 season, his batting hand, his type of bowling and his County Championship club.

| Name | Birth date | County club | Batting style | Bowling style | Ref. |
|---|---|---|---|---|---|
| Dennis Amiss | 7 April 1943 (aged 27) | Warwickshire | Right-handed | Left arm medium pace | |
| Geoffrey Boycott | 21 October 1940 (aged 29) | Yorkshire | Right-handed | Right arm medium pace | |
| David Brown | 30 January 1942 (aged 28) | Warwickshire | Right-handed | Right arm fast medium | |
| Colin Cowdrey | 24 December 1932 (aged 37) | Kent | Right-handed | Right arm leg break | |
| Basil D'Oliveira | 4 October 1931 (aged 38) | Worcestershire | Right-handed | Right arm medium pace | |
| Mike Denness | 1 December 1940 (aged 29) | Kent | Right-handed | Right arm medium pace | |
| John Edrich | 21 June 1937 (aged 32) | Surrey | Left-handed | Right arm medium pace | |
| Keith Fletcher | 20 May 1944 (aged 25) | Essex | Right-handed | Right arm leg break | |
| Tony Greig | 6 October 1946 (aged 23) | Sussex | Right-handed | Right arm medium pace | |
| Ray Illingworth (c) | 8 June 1932 (aged 37) | Leicestershire | Right-handed | Right arm off break | |
| Alan Jones | 4 November 1938 (aged 31) | Glamorgan | Left-handed | Right arm off break | |
| Alan Knott | 9 April 1946 (aged 24) | Kent | Right-handed | Wicket-keeper | |
| Peter Lever | 17 September 1940 (aged 29) | Lancashire | Right-handed | Right arm fast medium | |
| Brian Luckhurst | 5 February 1939 (aged 31) | Kent | Right-handed | Slow left-arm orthodox | |
| Chris Old | 22 December 1948 (aged 21) | Yorkshire | Right-handed | Right arm fast medium | |
| Phil Sharpe | 27 December 1936 (aged 33) | Yorkshire | Right-handed | Right arm off break | |
| Ken Shuttleworth | 13 November 1944 (aged 25) | Lancashire | Right-handed | Right arm fast | |
| John Snow | 13 October 1941 (aged 28) | Sussex | Right-handed | Right arm fast | |
| Derek Underwood | 8 June 1945 (aged 24) | Kent | Right-handed | Left arm medium pace | |
| Alan Ward | 10 August 1947 (aged 22) | Derbyshire | Right-handed | Right arm fast | |
| Don Wilson | 7 August 1937 (aged 32) | Yorkshire | Left-handed | Slow left-arm orthodox | |

== Matches ==
The Rest of the World XI were 4–1 winners of the five-match Test series but, despite a comprehensive defeat in the opening match, England were not outclassed and won the second Test to level the series with three to play. The World XI won the three remaining matches but in one case by only two wickets and the others by four and five wickets. Wisden was impressed by the quality of the World XI and said that "possibly only the Australian sides of 1921 and 1948 could have risen to the heights attained by The Rest", and England "proved worthy opponents". Wisden mentioned "a curious feature being that in all the five matches victory went to the side that fielded first".

=== First Test ===
Wisden commented that, with England having been completely outclassed in this opening match, "few could have expected the four following games to be so closely contested". The match started, unusually, on a Wednesday so that the Thursday could be a "rest day" for the general election. The outstanding performer was Gary Sobers who had first forged a bond between his multi-national players so that they became a formidable team rather than, as some had predicted, a collection of star-name individuals. Sobers then destroyed England's batting on the first morning, taking six for 21. Ray Illingworth batted well for a defiant 63 but, overall, it was a disastrous batting performance with England sorely missing the absent Geoff Boycott and John Edrich. Eddie Barlow with 119 demonstrated the sort of concentration that Boycott and Edrich might have provided. On Friday afternoon, Sobers and Intikhab Alam scored 197 together in the final two and a half hours of the day, the World XI completing a massive first innings lead of 419 on Saturday morning. England did better in their second innings and Illingworth fell (to Sobers) six short of a well-deserved century. Intikhab took the bowling honours with six for 113 and England were well beaten by an innings and 80 runs with a whole day to spare. Umpire Syd Buller, who died suddenly on 7 August, officiated in his last international match.

17–23 June 1970
(5-day match)
Scorecard
Wisden

| England | v | Rest of the World |
| 127 (55.1 overs); R. Illingworth 63; G. S. Sobers 6/21 (20 overs) | | 546 (154.5 overs); G. S. Sobers 183; E. J. Barlow 119; A. Ward 4/121 (33 overs) |
| 339 (174 overs); R. Illingworth 94; Intikhab Alam 6/113 (54 overs) |

Rest of the World won by an innings and 80 runs
Lord's, St John's Wood, London
Umpires: J. S. Buller (ENG) and A. E. Fagg (ENG)

- England won the toss and decided to bat
- the match began on a Wednesday and Thursday, 18 June was a rest day because of the general election; Sunday, 21 June was a normal rest day
- Alan Jones, Brian Luckhurst & Ken Shuttleworth made their debuts for England

=== Second Test ===
Wisden suggested the vagaries of the English weather as the deciding factor in this match which, contrary to expectations, was won by England. Cool, damp conditions on the first three days favoured the seam bowlers who were able to make the ball "swing freely". The main exponents were Basil D'Oliveira and Tony Greig (on debut) for England and Eddie Barlow for the World XI. Key innings were played by Clive Lloyd for the World and Ray Illingworth for England which left the match finely poised after completion of first innings, England having a slender lead of three runs. Barlow dominated proceedings on the Saturday and his defiant 142 accounted for virtually half his team's second innings total. D'Oliveira and Greig were again the best of the bowlers. The World innings ended on Monday morning and England had seven sessions in which to score 284. The weather had improved over the weekend and Monday was a bright day which produced a slow-paced pitch. Even so, England were still without Geoff Boycott and their batsmen proceeded with caution, especially Brian Luckhurst who batted for seven hours and played a "dogged innings" of 113 not out to see England home with four hours to spare on Tuesday.

2–7 July 1970
(5-day match)
Scorecard
Wisden

| Rest of the World | v | England |
| 276 (83.4 overs); C. H. Lloyd 114*; B. L. D'Oliveira 4/43 (17.4 overs); A. W. Greig 4/59 (18 overs) | | 279 (103.5 overs); R. Illingworth 97; E. J. Barlow 5/66 (20 overs) |
| 286 (107.2 overs); E. J. Barlow 142; B. L. D'Oliveira 3/63 (26 overs); A. W. Greig 3/71 (23 overs) | | 284/2 (135.2 overs); B. W. Luckhurst 113* |

England won by 8 wickets
Trent Bridge, Nottingham
Umpires: C. S. Elliott (ENG) and A. E. Fagg (ENG)

- toss unknown
- Sunday, 5 July was a rest day
- Tony Greig made his debut for England

=== Third Test ===
Wisden recalled that there was news off the field during this match because the England selectors met to decide which of Ray Illingworth or Colin Cowdrey, both playing in the match, would lead the team on the coming winter tour of Australia. Illingworth was chosen and he rewarded their faith in him by leading England to Ashes victory. In the current match, however, England struggled against formidable opponents who were determined to avenge their defeat at Nottingham. England were still without Geoff Boycott and fielded an unchanged team at Edgbaston. The World XI selected Peter Pollock and Deryck Murray in place of Graham McKenzie and Farokh Engineer. England were reduced to 76 for four in their first innings but Basil D'Oliveira led a recovery with help from Illingworth and Tony Greig. D'Oliveira made 110 and England reached what seemed a creditable 294. Despite the early loss of Eddie Barlow, the strength of the World XI batting is illustrated by the fact that no less than eight of them scored 40. The highlight was a fifth wicket partnership of 175 between Clive Lloyd (101) and Gary Sobers (80). England made a game of it on the last two days, exemplified by a stubborn last wicket stand of 45 between Alan Knott and John Snow. The World needed 141 to win in 195 minutes and struggled to get them. England reduced them to 107 for five but then Intikhab Alam and Mike Procter took control and quickly scored the remaining 34 runs.

16–21 July 1970
(5-day match)
Scorecard
Wisden

| England | v | Rest of the World |
| 294 (115.1 overs); B. L. D'Oliveira 110; M. J. Procter 5/46 (24.1 overs) | | 563/9 declared (187 overs); C. H. Lloyd 101; J. A. Snow 4/124 (38 overs); R. Illingworth 4/131 (49 overs) |
| 409 (205.5 overs); B. L. D'Oliveira 81; G. S. Sobers 4/89 (51.5 overs) | | 141/5 (43 overs); R. B. Kanhai 37; R. Illingworth 2/51 (14 overs) |

Rest of the World won by 5 wickets
Edgbaston, Birmingham
Umpires: A. E. Fagg (ENG) and A. E. G. Rhodes (ENG)

- toss unknown
- Sunday, 19 July was a rest day

=== Fourth Test ===
Geoff Boycott returned to the England team and, with perhaps a nod towards the venue, the selectors also picked his Yorkshire colleagues Don Wilson and the 21-year-old Chris Old. The World XI decided to strengthen their batting and Mushtaq Mohammad replaced Peter Pollock. Gary Sobers won the toss and Wisden recalled that he gambled by putting England in to bat "on a slow-drying pitch". Having struggled to reach 209 for four after a very poor start, England disintegrated completely in the face of a remarkable piece of bowling by Eddie Barlow who took four wickets in five balls, emulating the feat of Maurice Allom in New Zealand in 1930–31. Barlow dismissed Keith Fletcher, England's top scorer, and Alan Knott came in to bat. Barlow dismissed Knott second ball and then completed a hat trick by dismissing Chris Old and Don Wilson with his next two deliveries. The World XI's batting was impacted by back injuries sustained by Barry Richards and Rohan Kanhai while fielding. Richards could not open the innings so Deryck Murray was promoted and he scored a determined 95 in five hours but the World XI were on 152 for four when Gary Sobers came in to rally them, in Wisden's words, "with another splendid century". Once again, England staged a second innings recovery with half-centuries by Boycott, Brian Luckhurst, Fletcher and Ray Illingworth. Barlow with five for 78 completed a match analysis of twelve for 142. Needing 223 to win with a day and a half to go, the World XI slumped to 62 for five on the Monday afternoon. This brought Sobers and Intikhab together and they survived to the close with the overnight score at 75 for five. They needed another 148 to win and two of their remaining batsmen were the injured Kanhai and Richards. On Tuesday morning, a crucial incident occurred at 82 for five when Tony Greig at second slip dropped Intikhab off John Snow. Wisden reckoned that England would have won and squared the series if the catch had been taken. Intikhab and Sobers steadily moved the score forward until both were out shortly before lunch. Kanhai, batting despite his injury, was out immediately after lunch and the World XI were then on 183 for eight with 40 more needed. Richards, who had been out of action since Thursday, came out to join Mike Procter and these two settled the match and the series.

ESPNcricinfo has a World XI team photograph from this match. The players are: (back row; left to right) Deryck Murray, Barry Richards, Clive Lloyd, Mike Procter, Intikhab Alam, Mushtaq Mohammad; (front row; left to right) Rohan Kanhai, Eddie Barlow, Gary Sobers, Lance Gibbs, Graeme Pollock.

30 July – 4 August 1970
(5-day match)
Scorecard
Wisden

| England | v | Rest of the World |
| 222 (95.4 overs); K. W. R. Fletcher 89; E. J. Barlow 7/64 (22.4 overs) | | 376/9 declared (138.1 overs); G. S. Sobers 114; A. W. Greig 4/86 (31 overs) |
| 376 (168.5 overs); B. W. Luckhurst 92; E. J. Barlow 5/78 (32 overs) | | 226/8 (93.5 overs); G. S. Sobers 59; J. A. Snow 4/82 (27.5 overs) |

Rest of the World won by 2 wickets
Headingley, Leeds
Umpires: A. E. Fagg (ENG) and A. E. G. Rhodes (ENG)

- Rest of the World won the toss and decided to field
- Sunday, 2 August was a rest day
- Chris Old made his debut for England

=== Fifth Test ===
Wisden remarked on the "quality of the cricket" and highlighted "four notable individual performances in a match which brought a magnificent series to a distinguished close". England scored 294 in the first innings after winning the toss, Ray Illingworth completing his sixth half-century of the series. Graham McKenzie took three wickets in eight balls to reduce England from 266 for six to 266 for nine. The World XI responded with 355 which featured " a batting spectacle" by Graeme Pollock and Gary Sobers, who added 165 for the fifth wicket. England's best bowler was Peter Lever whose "command of perfect length and direction" enabled him to take seven wickets on debut. In England's second innings, Geoff Boycott produced a "masterly innings of 157 which gave England a chance of victory". It was not enough, however, against such world-class opposition and a century by Rohan Kanhai, well supported by Clive Lloyd and Gary Sobers, enabled the World XI to complete a 4–1 series victory. Sobers scored the winning runs to complete a series "in which he had been the dominant figure".

13–18 August 1970
(5-day match)
Scorecard
Wisden

| England | v | Rest of the World |
| 294 (147.2 overs); M. C. Cowdrey 73; G. D. McKenzie 4/51 (24 overs) | | 355 (118.5 overs); R. G. Pollock 114; P. Lever 7/83 (32.5 overs) |
| 344 (150.1 overs); G. Boycott 157; C. H. Lloyd 3/34 (18 overs) | | 287/6 (87.1 overs); R. B. Kanhai 100; J. A. Snow 4/81 (23 overs) |

Rest of the World won by 4 wickets
The Oval, London
Umpires: A. E. Fagg (ENG) and C. S. Elliott (ENG)

- England won the toss and decided to bat
- Sunday, 16 August was a rest day
- Peter Lever made his debut for England

=== T. N. Pearce's XI v Rest of the World XI (5–8 September) ===
This was an extra match played at the Scarborough Festival but it featured only seven of the players who appeared in the Test matches: Mushtaq, Kanhai, Murray and Gibbs for the World XI; Boycott, Amiss and Old for T. N. Pearce's XI. Kanhai and Roger Prideaux were the team captains. The match, played at North Marine Road Ground, was drawn.

5-8 September 1970
(3-day match)
Scorecard

| Rest of the World | v | TN Pearce's XI |
| 253 (69.3 overs) | | 229 (64.4 overs) |
| 321/5d (62 overs) | | 74/3 (17 overs) |

Match drawn
North Marine Road Ground, Scarborough
Umpires: Eddie Phillipson (ENG) and Tom Spencer (ENG)

- no toss

== Aftermath ==
England went to Australia the following winter and, in a controversial series, won The Ashes for the first time since Richie Benaud's team had beaten them in the 1958–59 series. England under Ray Illingworth were actually one of the most successful Test teams of all time. They created a world record in official Test cricket of 27 consecutive Tests without defeat from 1968 to 1971; the record was equaled by Clive Lloyd's West Indies team between 1981 and 1984. At the time, however, the Rest of the World Tests were recognised as official and England's record run has only been confirmed retrospectively. England took sixteen players on tour and fourteen of these had featured against the Rest of the World. The other two were reserve wicket-keeper Bob Taylor and Yorkshire batsman John Hampshire. Alan Ward had to return home because of injury problems and was replaced by the young fast bowler Bob Willis, who made his Test debut on the tour.

Another scheduled South African tour, this time to Australia, was cancelled in 1971 and the Rest of the World team was recreated, again under the captaincy of Gary Sobers. Besides Sobers, the squad included six other 1970 team members: Farokh Engineer, Intikhab Alam, Rohan Kanhai, Clive Lloyd and the Pollock brothers. It also included four England players: Norman Gifford, Tony Greig, Richard Hutton and Bob Taylor. The World XI won this series 2–1. As there were no more scheduled South African tours, the need for a World XI lapsed and it was many years before the concept was resurrected. South Africa as a team were banned from international cricket while the apartheid system existed, though many individual South African players were able to take part in the major domestic competitions of other countries. South Africa was reinstated by the ICC in 1991 and returned to Test match cricket in April 1992.

In June 2020, Alan Jones was recognised as an England Test cricketer by the England and Wales Cricket Board (ECB), with the ECB awarding him with cap number 696, fifty years after the match.

== Sources ==
- Barclays (1986). Swanton, E. W. (ed.). Barclays World of Cricket. London: Willow Books. ISBN 0-00-218193-2.
- Birley, Derek (1999). A Social History of English Cricket. London: Aurum Press Ltd. ISBN 1-85410-710-0.
- 1971 edition of the Wisden Cricketers Almanack
