= Arthur Phebey =

English cricketer

Arthur Henry Phebey (1 October 1924 – 28 June 1998) was an English cricketer who played for Kent County Cricket Club between 1946 and 1961. He played in 327 first-class cricket matches during his career as a right-handed opening batsman.

== Cricket career ==
Phebey was born at Catford in London in 1924. He played cricket for Kent Schools in 1939 before serving as a sub-lieutenant in the Royal Naval Volunteer Reserve during World War II. He made his first-class debut for Kent in 1946, and made 12 appearances during the season. Primarily an opening batsman, Phebey did not play the following season, and only appeared in two matches in 1948 before becoming a regular in the team between 1949 and his county retirement in 1961.

Described as an "elegant" opening batsman, Phebey was considered "correct and sound" and was a "mainstay" of the team throughout his time at Kent. In 1954 he and Arthur Fagg scored two century opening partnerships in the same match against Gloucestershire, only the second time a pair of Kent batsman had done so in the County Championship. (Note: The next time a Kent pair scored two century opening partnerships in the same match was in 2016.) In 1960 he played in the last first-class match in Britain to be concluded within a day's play. After being the first batsman out on the pitch at Tunbridge Wells, Phebey predicted that "if we get 200 on that, we'll win by an innings". Kent made 187 runs and bowled Worcestershire out twice after 3:40 to win by an innings.

In total Phebey played in 327 first-class matches, 320 of them for Kent. (Note: The other seven matches were all played for Marylebone Cricket Club (MCC).) He scored 14,653 runs, including 14 centuries with a highest score of 157, and passed 1,000 runs each season between 1952 and 1960, leading the county in runs scored in 1956. He bowled only 20 balls in his first-class career and did not take a wicket. A 1956 cigarette card described him as "a very sound fielder" and he took a total of 205 catches. Writing in 1980, John Woodcock compared Neil Taylor, an emerging Kent opening batsman, to Phebey, saying that he was "adhesive, quite stylish and not ineffective".

== Football ==
As well as cricket, Phebey was a footballer. He played wartime cricket and football matches for Dulwich Hamlet F.C., at the time an amateur club, and when he signed professionally with Kent was forced to find another team. He was part of the Hamlet junior team which won the 1939/40 London Minor Cup and has been described as "a post-war Hamlet star. He played for Hendon F.C. during the 1950s.

== Later life ==
Phebey retired at the end of the 1961 season, after being either left out or asked to bat lower in the order. This was because new opening batsmen Peter Richardson and Roger Prideaux were establishing themselves. Phebey was active in the business community, and was a member of the General Committee at Kent. He died at Kingswood in Surrey in 1998. He was aged 73.

== Bibliography ==
- Carlaw, Derek (2024). Kent County Cricketers, A to Z: Part Three (1946–1999) (PDF). Cardiff: ACS.
- Ellis, Clive; Pennell, Mark (2010). Trophies and Tribulations: Forty Years of Kent Cricket. London: Greenwich Publishing. ISBN 978-09-56408-10-5.
- Moore, Dudley (1998). The History of Kent County Cricket Club. London: Christopher Helm. ISBN 978-07-47022-09-1.
