= Alan Jones (cricketer, born 1938) =

Welsh cricketer

Personal information
- Full name: Alan Jones
- Born: 4 November 1938 (age 88); Felindre, Glamorgan, Wales
- Batting: Left-handed
- Bowling: Right-arm off-break
- Role: Opening batsman
- Relatives: Eifion Jones (brother)

Domestic team information
- Years: Team
- 1957–1983: Glamorgan
- FC debut: 31 July 1957 Glamorgan v Gloucestershire
- Last FC: 13 September 1983 Glamorgan v Hampshire

Career statistics
Competition	First-class	List A
Matches	645	288
Runs scored	36,049	7,157
Batting average	32.89	27.21
100s/50s	56/194	2/42
Top score	204*	124*
Balls bowled	594	33
Wickets	3	3
Bowling average	111.00	9.00
5 wickets in innings	0	0
10 wickets in match	0	0
Best bowling	1/24	3/21
Catches/stumpings	288/–	76/–
- Source: CricketArchive, 28 February 2009

Alan Jones MBE (born 4 November 1938) is a Welsh cricketer, who played for Glamorgan for almost a quarter of a century. He also played, for a single season each, with Western Australia, Natal and Northern Transvaal. He holds the record for scoring the most runs in first-class cricket without playing in an official Test match.

== Career ==
Jones was a consistent, compact left-handed opening batsman who scored 1,000 first-class runs in every English cricket season from 1961 to 1983, when he retired. In five out of six seasons from 1963 to 1968 he scored more than 1,800 runs, and averaged in the mid-30s for most seasons. His consistency and reliability were the foundation for the Championship-winning Glamorgan side of 1969, but were just as important in the much less successful sides of the 1970s.

A product of local cricket near Swansea, Jones played first for Glamorgan in 1957. After two years of National Service, he was a regular in the county side in 1960 and made 1,000 runs for the first time in 1961, winning his cap in 1962. Thereafter he was a fixture in the side until he retired at the end of the 1983 season, and his record of scoring 1,000 runs in 23 seasons has been beaten by only 10 other cricketers. His total career aggregate of 36,049 first-class runs put him 35th on the all-time list of run-getters and is the highest of any player who did not play Test cricket. (Perhaps not coincidentally, his Glamorgan colleague Don Shepherd holds the record for taking the most first class wickets without playing a test match). His 56 centuries in first-class cricket is exceeded only by John Langridge among non-Test players. In addition to these first-class runs, he also scored more than 7,000 runs in List A matches. He is the Glamorgan record holder for career runs and, jointly with Hugh Morris, for centuries.

Jones is unique in having won a Test cap and then having had it taken away. He was picked, along with fellow opening batsman Brian Luckhurst, to début in the first match between England and the Rest of the World XI in 1970 after the cancellation of the South African cricket team's tour. He scored five and nought, dismissed by Mike Procter in both innings, and was not picked again. The match, originally given Test status, was later ruled not to count as a Test match. All the other players who played in this series appeared in Test cricket in other series.

Jones captained Glamorgan in 1977 and 1978. He was named as a Wisden Cricketer of the Year in 1978, after taking the county to its first List A final in the Gillette Cup the previous season.

Jones' brother, Eifion Jones, was Glamorgan's wicketkeeper for much of the period that Jones was the opening batsman, and his son Andrew played once in a List A match for Glamorgan. He gained a reputation as a world-class coach, and coaches the Wales under 11s cricket team with the help of Peter Davies.

In June 2020, Jones was recognised as an England Test cricketer by the England and Wales Cricket Board (ECB), with the ECB awarding him cap number 696, fifty years after the match.
