= Derek Aslett =

English cricketer

Personal information
- Full name: Derek George Aslett
- Born: 12 February 1958 (age 68); Dover, Kent, England
- Batting: Right-handed
- Bowling: Right-arm leg break
- Role: Batsman

Domestic team information
- Years: Team
- 1981–1987: Kent
- FC debut: 29 August 1981 Kent v Hampshire
- Last FC: 12 September 1987 Kent v Leicestershire
- LA debut: 30 August 1981 Kent v Middlesex
- Last LA: 6 September 1987 Kent v Sussex

Career statistics
Competition	First-class	List A
Matches	119	95
Runs scored	6,128	2,161
Batting average	34.23	27.35
100s/50s	12/26	2/9
Top score	221*	122*
Balls bowled	1,597	5
Wickets	17	1
Bowling average	73.70	0.00
5 wickets in innings	0	0
10 wickets in match	0	0
Best bowling	4/119	1/0
Catches/stumpings	82/–	24/–
- Source: Cricinfo, 20 March 2017

Derek George Aslett (born 12 February 1958) is an English former professional cricketer. He played for Kent County Cricket Club between 1981 and 1987, making more than 200 appearances for the county in first-class and limited overs cricket.

A right-handed batsman, Aslett scored over 8,000 senior runs for Kent and made 14 centuries for the team. His highest score of 221 not out was made in 1984 against the Sri Lanka national cricket team. He retired from the professional game aged 29 after being released by Kent and moved to Australia.

== Early life ==
Aslett was born at Dover in Kent in 1958. His father, George, had played cricket for Dover Wanderers after World War II, and Aslett was educated at Dover Grammar School for Boys in the town and at the University of Leicester. He played club cricket for Dover Cricket Club and, after making his Second XI debut for Kent in 1976, was awarded his Second XI cap in 1981, the season in which he made his senior debut for the team.

== Professional career ==
A last-minute replacement, Aslett made his first-class debut at the end of August 1981 against Hampshire at Bournemouth. He was aged 23―The History of Kent County Cricket Club says he "finally got his chance"―and scored 148 runs not out "in fine style" in his first innings, setting a Kent record for runs scored on debut for the county; in Kent's second innings he made 20 not out, a match aggregate of 168 runs without being out. He made his List A debut on 30 August in a 1981 John Player League fixture against Middlesex at Canterbury. (Note: Aslett's List A debut came on the day immediately after the first day of his first-class debut, a rest day during the three-day match against Hampshire. The Hampshire fixture, which was played in Bournemouth, continued the following day, with the Kent team needing to travel from Bournemouth to Canterbury and back again to play the Sunday league fixture, a distance of around 165 miles (266 km) each way.)

After playing one more match in 1981, Aslett became a more established member of the Kent team during the 1982 season, playing in 16 first-class and eight one-day matches. (Note: Kent played 24 first-class and 22 one-day matches during the 1982 season.) By the following season he was a key member of the team and scored almost 1,500 runs in both 1983 and 1984, being awarded his county cap in 1983. His eight centuries during the two seasons included scores of 168 and 119 in one match against Derbyshire in 1983, and 221 not out, his highest first-class score, made against the touring Sri Lankans at Canterbury in 1984. He scored a total of 12 first-class and two one-day centuries for Kent during his career.

Aslett lost his place in the Kent team to Neil Taylor in 1985, although he still played in 13 first-class matches during the season and 17 in the next. His batting average fell and, with Kent needing to reduce their playing staff due to financial pressures, he was released by the county at the end of the 1987 season, despite playing in 25 first-class matches and scoring 969 runs during the year. His inconsistent form compared to that of Simon Hinks, meant captain Chris Cowdrey felt it had to be Aslett who was released, a decision Cowdrey regards as his "one big disappointment" as captain. Aged 29, Aslett chose to retire from the county game; team-mate Chris Penn, whom Aslett regularly travelled to games with, considers that he was "increasingly weighed down by technical thoughts" and that this was a factor in his retirement.

Primarily a batsman, Aslett made over 200 senior appearances for Kent. He scored 6,128 runs in his 119 first-class matches and 2,161 in 95 one-day games. The History of Kent Cricket described him as an "unorthodox right-hander, particularly strong on the offside and reliant on variations of the square cut", a description Aslett has rejected as being too negative an appraisal of his abilities. He took 17 first-class wickets with his occasional leg spin deliveries, seven of them during his second season in 1982. He was on the losing team in two one-day finals, the 1983 and 1984 NatWest Trophy finals.

== Retirement ==
Following his retirement, Aslett continued to build his antiques business in Dover where his family had been involved in the furnishing trade since the late 1800s. He emigrated to Perth in Western Australia in 1988. He had played Western Australian Grade Cricket during his career, and Aslett continued to be involved in the game. He was credited as a mentor by Luke Pomersbach, a Western Australian player who made one appearance for the Australia national cricket team in 2007.

Aslett set up an antiques business in Perth, Aslett Antiques and Mid Century in 1993. His son, Liam, who was born in Perth, played club cricket in England between 2004 and 2008 and made one appearance for Nottinghamshire Second XI in 2006.
