= David Halfyard =

English cricketer

Personal information
- Full name: David John Halfyard
- Born: 3 April 1931; Winchmore Hill, Middlesex
- Died: 23 August 1996 (aged 65); Northam, Devon
- Batting: Right-handed
- Bowling: Right-arm fast-medium

Domestic team information
- Years: Team
- 1956–1964: Kent
- 1968–1970: Nottinghamshire
- 1971–1972: Durham
- 1973: Northumberland
- 1974–1982: Cornwall

Career statistics
Competition	First-class	List A
Matches	264	44
Runs scored	3,242	228
Batting average	10.91	7.60
100s/50s	0/2	0/0
Top score	79	25
Balls bowled	55,815	2,353
Wickets	963	59
Bowling average	25.77	23.69
5 wickets in innings	55	0
10 wickets in match	13	0
Best bowling	9/39	4/19
Catches/stumpings	112/–	13/–
- Source: CricInfo, 18 October 2010

David John Halfyard (3 April 1931 – 23 August 1996) was an English professional cricketer who played first-class cricket for Kent County Cricket Club and Nottinghamshire County Cricket Club between 1956 and 1970. He was primarily a bowler and took nearly 1,000 wickets during his first-class career. He also played Minor County cricket for Northumberland, Durham and Cornwall. Following a road traffic accident in 1962, Halfyard retired from cricket to become an umpire but was able to return to the game in 1968.

== Early life ==
Halfyard was born at Winchmore Hill in Middlesex in 1931. He was educated at Purley County Grammar School after a family move to Surrey. He played youth cricket for clubs at Banstead and Beddington.

== Cricket career ==
Halfyard played one cricket match for the Army whilst on national service in 1954 and then joined Surrey as a young professional, playing for the Second XI in 1954 and 1955. He was unable to break into the First XI and left Surrey for Kent after the 1955 season.

=== Kent career and accident ===
Halfyard made his first-class debut for Kent in 1956 against Cambridge University. His debut in the County Championship came in that same season against Derbyshire and he took 58 wickets during the season for Kent. He was described in 1957 as a bowler with "controlled variation of length and flight and the ability to cut his low-trajectory deliveries back from the off quite sharply" and he bowled consistently for Kent, taking 100 wickets in each season between 1957 and 1961, his last full season with the county. He played for Kent in 185 first-class matches, taking 769 wickets, including five wickets in an innings 49 times and ten wickets in a match 13 times. His best figures were 9/39 in 1957 against Glamorgan, the season in which he was awarded his county cap.

During the 1962 season he took 98 wickets before he was involved in a head-on collision in a road traffic accident whilst driving to a Kent match against Somerset at Weston-super-Mare. He was badly injured, including breaking his leg, and played only one club match in 1963 whilst attempting to regain his fitness. He played some Second XI cricket and appeared two matches in 1964 before injuring his achilles tendon and was released by Kent, although the county arranged a benefit season in 1965 which raised over £3,000. Halfyard retired from first-class cricket, although he played as a professional for Greenock in Scotland in 1966 and in 1967 qualified as a first-class umpire, having failed to attract any interest from first-class counties as a player.

=== Return to cricket with Nottinghamshire ===
After his accident and injury Halfyard was claiming industrial injury benefit and umpiring on the first-class panel. Before a match between Nottinghamshire and Sussex he was bowling in the nets and attracted the interest of some of Nottinghamshire's players. After two trials at the end of the season he was offered a one-year contract – becoming perhaps the only cricketer to retire from first-class cricket, become an umpire, and later return to the first-class game. He made his first-class debut for Nottinghamshire against Middlesex in 1968, a season in which, despite questionable fitness, he played every match.

Halfyard played 77 times for Nottinghamshire from 1968 to 1970, with his final first-class match coming for the county against Kent. He was capped in 1968 and took 194 wickets for the county, with six five wicket hauls and best figures of 6/14, taken in a match against Hampshire which Halfyard "virtually won" single-handed. He also played in 38 one-day matches, the last of which came against Surrey in the 1970 John Player League.

=== Minor Counties Cricket ===
Following the end of his first-class career, Halfyard joined Durham, playing 14 times for the county in the Minor Counties Championship and in one match in the 1972 Gillette Cup. He also played for Minor Counties North against Yorkshire in the 1972 Benson & Hedges Cup. He moved to Northumberland in 1973, as well as playing again for Minor Counties North in the 1973 Benson & Hedges Cup. In all three seasons playing for Durham and Northumberland he was his county's leading wicket taker.

Halfyard joined Cornwall in 1974, playing 27 times for the county between 1974 and 1982 in the Minor Counties Championship and in two List A matches. He led the Minor Counties bowling averages in his first season with the county, taking 74 wickets at a bowling average of 9.71 runs.

== Later life ==
Halfyard returned to the first-class umpires panel whilst still representing Cornwall in 1977, although he only played a few matches for the county. He left the first-class umpires panel in 1981 but continued to stand as an umpire until 1996, when his final match standing as an umpire in a county match came in a Minor Counties Championship match between Cornwall and Devon. He also played for Devon Over-50s from 1988 to 1993. He was still bowling with some success in the Devon Cricket League for Tiverton Heathcoat Cricket Club weeks before his death in August 1996 in Northam, Devon, at the age of 65.
