= Terry Barwell =

South African cricketer (born 1937)

Personal information
- Full name: Terence Ian Barwell
- Born: 29 April 1937 (age 89); Bloemhof, Transvaal, South Africa
- Nickname: Pa
- Batting: Right-handed
- Bowling: off-spinner
- Role: Batsman, occ. wicketkeeper
- Relatives: Barwells, Mellis's and Marshalls

Domestic team information
- Years: Team
- 1972–1973: Wiltshire, Minor Counties
- 1959–1968: Somerset
- First-class debut: 8 July 1959; Somerset v Combined Services
- Last First-class: 3 August 1973; Minor Counties v West Indies

Career statistics
Competition	First-class	List A
Matches	44	9
Runs scored	1344	177
Batting average	19.47	22.12
100s/50s	0/9	0/1
Top score	84*	64*
Catches/stumpings	39/1	5/0
- Source: CricketArchive, 13 November 2008

Terence Ian Barwell (born 29 April 1937) is a South African-born former cricketer who played first-class and List A cricket for Somerset over a 10-season period from 1959 to 1968. He later represented Wiltshire in the Minor Counties and played List A cricket for both Wiltshire and for Minor Counties representative sides. He became a schoolteacher.

== Life and career ==
Born at Bloemhof in Transvaal, Barwell was a right-handed middle-order batsman and an occasional wicketkeeper. Towards the end of his first-class career, when he played for Somerset's second eleven, he also bowled with some success.

Barwell played first for Somerset in 1959 in a match against the Combined Services, keeping wicket and making the only stumping of his first-class career. Unable to play County Championship cricket until 1961 as he qualified for the county by residence, his appearances were in any case restricted in some seasons by his career as a schoolmaster. But even in those seasons when he was more regularly available, he often found himself a fringe first-team player, never making more than 11 first-class appearances in any one season and managing a highest season aggregate of just 410 runs, which he achieved in 1967.

His best score was an unbeaten and quick 84 against Glamorgan at Weston-super-Mare in 1965. He also made 74 not out against the Pakistanis in 1967, though he was much upstaged by a second wicket partnership of 262 between Roy Virgin and Mervyn Kitchen, who made 162 and 189 respectively. He appeared in Somerset's losing Gillette Cup side of 1967, being run out for 24 in what Wisden termed "a fearful mix-up" with Graham Burgess. After starting the 1968 season as a regular member of the side, he dropped out after a few games and did not regain his place.

In second eleven cricket, Barwell was a reliable and prolific scorer, acting as batsman, occasional wicketkeeper, sometime captain and, more rarely, bowler. His final match for the combined Gloucestershire and Somerset Second Eleven side in 1968 saw him make 45 out of 54 added while he was at the wicket in a first innings that totalled only 78, top-score in the second innings with 68 and then take four wickets for 14 runs as the combined side recovered to force a draw with Kent's second eleven.

After leaving Somerset, he played for Wiltshire, appearing in first-round Gillette Cup matches against Hampshire in both 1972 and 1973, and also turning out for the Minor Counties representative side in the Benson and Hedges Cup. In 1973, he made a single final first-class cricket appearance for the Minor Counties side against the West Indies at Torquay.

As a schoolmaster, Barwell taught at Dr Morgan's School, Bridgwater, Marlborough College and at Blundell's School.
