= Roger Harman =

English cricketer (born 1941)

Personal information
- Born: 28 December 1941 (age 84); Hersham, Surrey, England
- Batting: Right-handed
- Bowling: Slow left-arm orthodox

Career statistics
Competition	First-class	List A
Matches	144	1
Runs scored	949	0
Batting average	9.98	–
100s/50s	0/0	–/–
Top score	34	–
Balls bowled	21051	53
Wickets	378	3
Bowling average	23.74	16.66
5 wickets in innings	18	0
10 wickets in match	3	–
Best bowling	8/12	3/50
Catches/stumpings	84/–	0/–
- Source: CricketArchive

Roger Harman (born 28 December 1941 in Hersham) is a former English first-class cricketer. He played with Surrey from 1961 until 1968 and also represented the International Cavaliers.

He played in four first-class matches in 1961 and in five the following year. In 1963 he played in 13 fixtures, and took a hat-trick against Kent at Blackheath. With Tony Lock having left Surrey, 1964 was Harman's first full season, and he took 136 wickets at 21.01. His innings figures included 8/12 against Nottinghamshire at Trent Bridge and 8/32 against Kent. Towards the end of the season his spin partner was the seventeen-year-old off-spinner Pat Pocock.

However he found the high expectations aroused by his success imposed enormous pressure on him, and from that point his performances declined. He managed 63 wickets the following year, 50 in 1966 and only 18 in 1967, by which time he was no longer a first team regular.

In 1968 he managed 48 wickets, largely thanks to a spinner-friendly pitch at Ilkeston, where he took 6 for 97 and 8 for 16 (including a hat-trick) against Derbyshire. But four further appearances produced only two more wickets and he was not retained on Surrey's staff at the end of the season.
