= Alan Brown (cricketer, born 1935) =

English cricketer (1935–2026)

Personal information
- Born: 17 October 1935; Rainworth, Nottinghamshire, England
- Died: 15 October 2026 (aged 90); Longfield, Kent, England
- Batting: Right-handed
- Bowling: Right-arm fast-medium

International information
- National side: England
- Test debut: 21 October 1961 v Pakistan
- Last Test: 11 November 1961 v India

Career statistics
Competition	Test	FC	LA
Matches	2	251	31
Runs scored	3	2,189	194
Batting average	–	9.72	9.70
100s/50s	0/0	0/3	0/0
Top score	3*	81	37
Balls bowled	323	40,603	1,516
Wickets	3	743	37
Bowling average	50.00	24.66	25.54
5 wickets in innings	0	26	0
10 wickets in match	0	4	0
Best bowling	3/27	8/47	4/17
Catches/stumpings	1/–	104/–	8/–
- Source: CricInfo, 4 April 2017

Alan Brown (17 October 1935 – 15 October 2026) was an English professional cricketer who played in two Test matches against Pakistan and India in 1961. He also played County cricket for Kent County Cricket Club between 1957 and 1970.

== Cricket career ==
Alan Brown was born in Rainworth, Nottinghamshire, England on 17 October 1935. He was a genuine fast bowler in his youth. He went on the 1961/1962 tour to India, Pakistan and Ceylon when the regular England pace attack (including Trueman and Statham) declined to tour, but found the wickets too flat for his style of bowling. He took 3 for 27 in Pakistan's second innings on his debut as England ran out winners by five wickets, but went wicketless in the draw against India in Bombay.

After making one appearance for Nottinghamshire Second XI in 1953, Brown made his first-class cricket debut in 1957 for Kent against Cambridge University. He played regularly for Kent until 1970 as the county's main strike bowler. He was capped by the county in 1961 and took 100 wickets in 1965.

Bowling with a drag more suited to the back foot no ball rule, he led Kent's attack for a decade although his pace declined with age. His most successful season came in 1965, when he claimed 119 wickets with a bowling average of 19.04, but further England honours eluded him.

A hard hitting tail end batsman, he scored three fifties with a best of 81. He retired in 1970, with 743 first-class cricket wickets at under 25 apiece. A talented all round sportsman, he also played football as a centre-forward for Gravesend & Northfleet, Margate, Canterbury City, Deal Town, Bexley United and Whitstable Town.

== Death ==
Brown died from cancer on 15 October 2026, aged 90.
