= Peter Robinson (cricketer, born 1943) =

English cricketer

Personal information
- Full name: Peter James Robinson
- Born: 9 February 1943 (age 83); St John's, Worcester, England
- Batting: Left-handed
- Bowling: Slow left-arm orthodox

Domestic team information
- Years: Team
- 1963–1964: Worcestershire
- 1965–1978: Somerset

Career statistics
Competition	FC	LA
Matches	185	63
Runs scored	4,936	964
Batting average	21.27	22.41
100s/50s	3/21	0/3
Top score	140	71*
Balls bowled	18,048	210
Wickets	297	8
Bowling average	27.27	12.87
5 wickets in innings	10	0
10 wickets in match	1	N/A
Best bowling	7/10	3/17
Catches/stumpings	170/0	25/0
- Source: CricketArchive, 28 November 2008

Peter James Robinson (born 9 February 1943) is a former English cricketer who played first-class cricket for Worcestershire and Somerset during the 1960s and 1970s; he also played List A cricket for Somerset, who capped him in 1966. He is the nephew of England Test cricketer Roly Jenkins.

== Cricket career ==
=== Worcestershire ===
Robinson was playing for Worcestershire's Second XI at the age of 17, and in August 1960 he took 5/7 against Lancashire II, including four wickets in five balls. However, his first-class debut had to wait another three years, until Worcestershire faced the Pakistan Eaglets in June 1963. Robinson took three wickets, accounting for Intikhab Alam in both innings. He played three more first-class games that season, without any great success. In 1964 Robinson played just once, and that against Cambridge University, and he left to join Somerset for the 1965 season.

=== Somerset ===
The contrast was immediate: Robinson was a first-team player at once, and remained so for some years. He made his Somerset debut (also his List A debut) in a Gillette Cup match against Berkshire in April, ending with figures of 3.5–2–2–2. In the first-class game, he claimed 44 wickets at 23.54, including 6/105 against Yorkshire late in the summer. In a low-scoring match, he gave a hint as to his future batting ability by scoring 37 from number ten in the order, helping to add 54 for the ninth wicket after Somerset had fallen to 66/8.

From 1966 to 1970, Robinson played more than 20 first-class matches each year, and in 1969 and 1970 especially was also an important part of the county's one-day squad. He improved his batting considerably, and in 1970 passed a thousand first-class runs in a season for the only time, finishing with 1,158 at 26.93; he had also come close to the mark in 1967, when he scored 917 runs. Of the three first-class centuries he made in his career, the highest was the 140 he struck against Northamptonshire in late May 1970.

With the ball, Robinson's most productive summer was that of 1966, when he finished with 70 first-class wickets at 21.41, including five five-wicket bags and his solitary ten-wicket match haul. The latter came against Surrey in early June, when his returns of 7/48 and 4/39 proved enough to assist Somerset to a two-wicket victory. A few weeks earlier, he had recorded his best innings figures, running through Nottinghamshire at Trent Bridge with a remarkable second-innings return of 17.2–14–10–7 as they collapsed from 37/0 to 62 all out. The closest he got to having his averages "the right way round" for an all-rounder was in 1967, when he averaged 26.20 with the bat and 27.90 with the ball.

After 1970 Robinson's career began to decline. He did score one final century, hitting 112 against Glamorgan in August 1971, but he never again played a full season. His bowling reduced to almost nothing: from 1971 onward, he never took more than three first-class wickets over the course of a summer. His last first-class game was in 1977 against Gloucestershire; in this match he claimed his final wicket, that of David Graveney. Robinson's final List A match came the following June against Sussex. At the age of 34, his career in senior cricket was over, although he continued to turn out for Somerset's Second XI into his early fifties, captaining that side on a considerable number of occasions.
