= Alan Dixon (cricketer) =

English cricketer (born 1933)

Personal information
- Full name: Alan Leonard Dixon
- Born: 27 November 1933 (age 92); Dartford, Kent, England
- Batting: Right-handed
- Bowling: Right-arm medium Right-arm off break

Domestic team information
- Years: Team
- 1950–1970: Kent

Career statistics
Competition	First-class	List A
Matches	381	23
Runs scored	9,589	122
Batting average	18.83	11.09
100s/50s	3/37	0/0
Top score	125*	23*
Balls bowled	55,620	1,070
Wickets	935	34
Bowling average	25.73	18.82
5 wickets in innings	46	2
10 wickets in match	10	0
Best bowling	8/61	7/15
Catches/stumpings	155/–	5/–
- Source: CricInfo, 10 November 2016

Alan Leonard Dixon (born 27 November 1933) is a former English professional cricketer. He played for Kent County Cricket Club between 1950 and 1970.

Dixon made his first-class cricket debut for Kent in 1950 in a County Championship match against Essex at Clacton in August 1960. Dixon was aged 16 years and 248 days old on his debut. At the time he was the second youngest player to play for the county after Wally Hardinge and, as of 2016, is one of only five 16 year olds to have played for Kent. He played just one match for the First XI in 1950 and once in 1954 before becoming a more regular member of the team in the 1955 season. During this period he appeared regularly for the county Second XI in the Minor Counties Championship and was awarded his Second XI cap in 1951. He was awarded his county cap in 1960 and played until the 1970 season, making a total of 378 first-class appearances for Kent as an all-rounder. Dixon also appeared twice for Marylebone Cricket Club (MCC) and once for an AER Gilligan XI as well as making 23 List A cricket for Kent during his career. Despite a relatively limited number of List A appearances he led the country in List A wickets taken in the 1967 season as Kent won the 1967 Gillette Cup.

Dixon had originally retired from cricket at the end of the 1957 season to become a travelling salesman before reconsidering at the start of the 1958 season and rejoining the county. After retirement he coached cricket at Tonbridge School. He coached, among others, Kent and England swing bowler Richard Ellison who credited Dixon with developing his talent. Ellison was selected as one of Wisden's four Cricketers of the Year in 1986.

In 2011 Dixon was short-listed as one of the 40 candidates for the Kent Legends Walkway at the St Lawrence Ground, the county's base in Canterbury. He took 100 first-class wickets in a season for Kent in each season between 1964 and 1966, his highest total being 122 in 1964 and as of 2016 is tenth in the list of all time wicket takers for Kent.
