= Norman Graham =

English cricketer

Personal information
- Full name: John Norman Graham
- Born: 8 May 1943 (age 83); Hexham, Northumberland
- Height: 6 ft 8 in (2.03 m)
- Batting: Right-handed
- Bowling: Right-arm medium
- Role: Bowler

Domestic team information
- Years: Team
- 1964–1977: Kent
- 1980–1984: Northumberland
- FC debut: 23 May 1964 Kent v Worcestershire
- Last FC: 27 July 1977 Kent v Surrey
- LA debut: 27 May 1964 Kent v Lancashire
- Last LA: 4 July 1984 Northumberland v Middlesex

Career statistics
Competition	First-class	List A
Matches	189	123
Runs scored	408	85
Batting average	3.88	6.07
100s/50s	0/0	0/0
Top score	23	13
Balls bowled	36,409	6,254
Wickets	614	172
Bowling average	22.34	18.68
5 wickets in innings	26	1
10 wickets in match	3	0
Best bowling	8/20	5/7
Catches/stumpings	40/–	24/–
- Source: CricInfo, 9 September 2014

John Norman Graham (born 8 May 1943) is a former English professional cricketer who played for Kent County Cricket Club during the 1960s and 1970s. He was born at Hexham in Northumberland.

Graham was a very tall medium-fast right-arm seam bowler. He made his first-class cricket debut for Kent in 1964. Having played a few matches for Kent in each season from 1964, he took 104 first-class wickets in the 1967 season at an average of 13.90, including dismissing England opening batsman Geoffrey Boycott for the only pair of his career. Kent finished as runners-up in the County Championship and won the 1967 Gillette Cup. Although technically a medium pace bowler, Graham was able to use his height – 6 feet 8 inches (2.03 m) – to produce bounce and lateral movement normally associated with faster bowlers.

In 1968, he was picked for Marylebone Cricket Club (MCC) match against Surrey at Lord's. Graham was never again to reproduce the kind of form he displayed in 1967, but he remained a useful county performer for Kent for a further nine seasons, taking more than 70 wickets in 1968, 1969 and 1971 and played a part in Kent's 1970 County Championship winning team and in the teams which won six one-day cup competitions between 1970 and 1976. In 1969, he took eight Essex wickets for 20 runs in the match at Brentwood as the home team was dismissed for just 34 runs in their second innings. He also became a highly effective bowler in one-day cricket in the early 1970s. He won his county cap in 1967 and remained with Kent until the end of the 1977 season, his benefit season, during which the team shared the 1977 County Championship title with Middlesex.

Graham was a number 11 batsman throughout his career. His highest score in first-class cricket was 23 and his total of first-class wickets comfortably exceeded his total of first-class runs. He was also generally considered a poor fielder, his ground fielding being described as "often entertainingly poor".

After retiring from first-class cricket he played Minor Counties cricket for his native Northumberland, retiring to Hexham where he worked in the financial services industry. Graham's father Jack played for Northumberland before and after the Second World War and his cousin, Peter Graham, also played for Northumberland and for Yorkshire Cricket Board.
