= Bob Wilson (cricketer) =

English cricketer

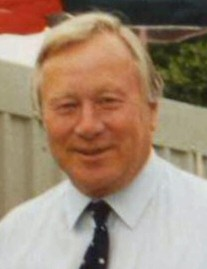

Personal information
- Full name: Robert Colin Wilson
- Born: 18 February 1928 (age 98); Bapchild, Kent
- Batting: Left-handed
- Bowling: Right-arm off-break
- Role: Middle order batsman

Domestic team information
- Years: Team
- 1952–1967: Kent
- FC debut: 2 July 1952 Kent v Yorkshire
- Last FC: 26 August 1967 Kent v Warwickshire
- LA debut: 27 May 1964 Kent v Lancashire
- Last LA: 13 May 1967 Kent v Essex

Career statistics
Competition	First-class	List A
Matches	367	5
Runs scored	19,511	67
Batting average	32.09	13.40
100s/50s	30/109	0/0
Top score	159*	44
Balls bowled	109	0
Wickets	4	–
Bowling average	22.50	–
5 wickets in innings	0	–
10 wickets in match	0	–
Best bowling	3/38	–
Catches/stumpings	201/–	0/–
- Source: CricInfo, 18 February 2018

Robert Colin Wilson (born 18 February 1928) is a former cricketer who played for Kent County Cricket Club from 1952 to 1967. Born in Bapchild in Kent in 1928, he appeared in 365 first-class cricket matches for the county as well as in five List A cricket matches towards the end of his career. He was awarded his county cap in 1954.

Wilson was a very straight batsman who was never afraid to attack. He scored 1,000 runs in a season in thirteen consecutive years, with a best of 2,038 at an average of 46.31 in 1964. His 19,458 runs for Kent in first-class cricket is the eighth in Kent's all-time list.
