= Mike Denness =

Scottish cricketer and match referee (1940–2013)

Mike Denness OBE
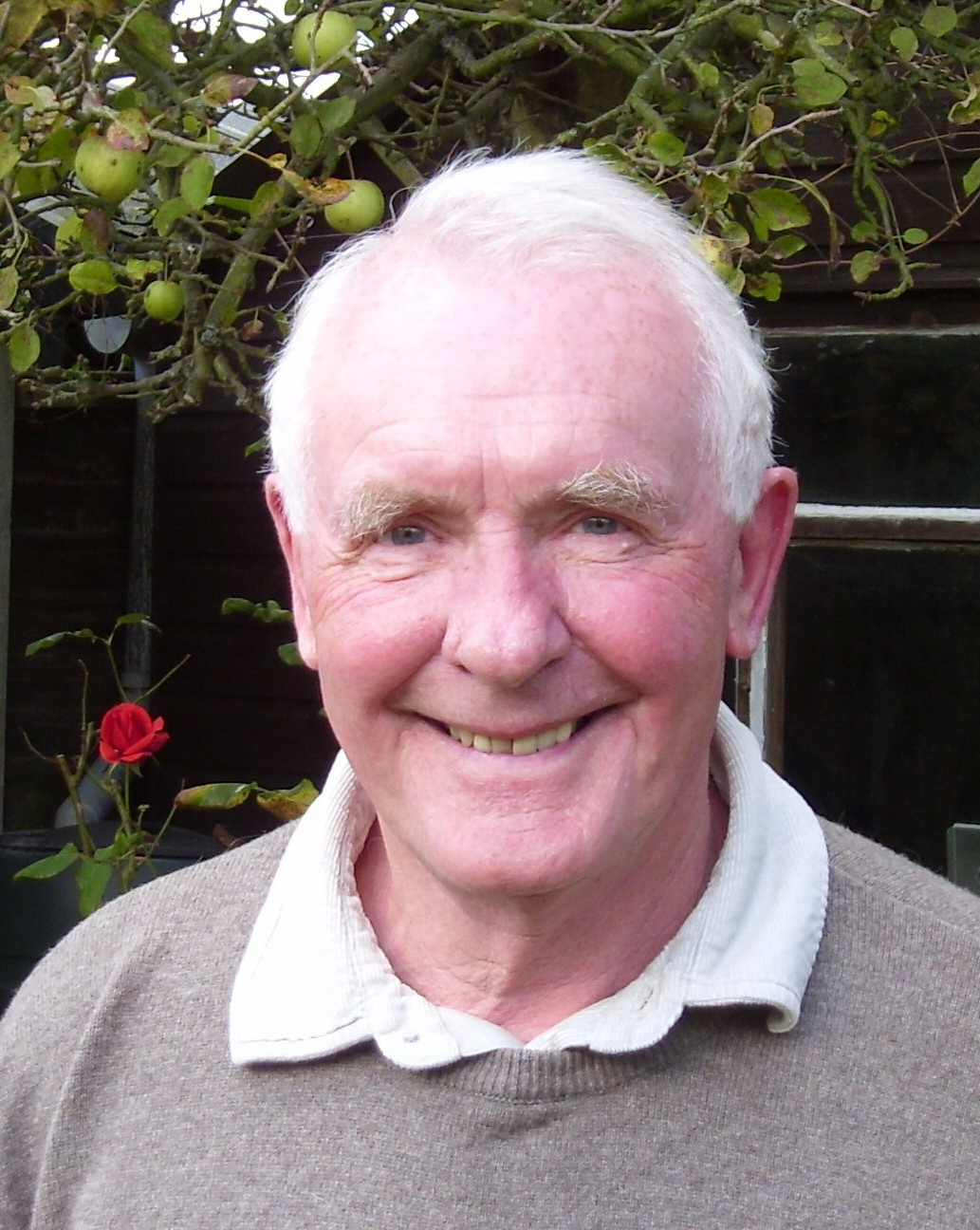

Personal information
- Full name: Michael Henry Denness
- Born: 1 December 1940; Bellshill, Lanarkshire, Scotland
- Died: 19 April 2013 (aged 72); London, England
- Height: 5 ft 11 in (1.80 m)
- Batting: Right-handed
- Bowling: Right arm off break Right arm medium
- Role: Batsman, match referee

International information
- National side: England
- Test debut (cap 444): 21 August 1969 v New Zealand
- Last Test: 14 July 1975 v Australia
- ODI debut (cap 21): 5 September 1973 v West Indies
- Last ODI: 18 June 1975 v Australia

Domestic team information
- Years: Team
- 1959–1967: Scotland
- 1962–1976: Kent
- 1977–1980: Essex

Career statistics
Competition	Test	ODI	FC	LA
Matches	28	12	501	232
Runs scored	1,667	264	25,886	5,393
Batting average	39.69	29.33	33.48	27.23
100s/50s	4/7	0/1	33/152	6/28
Top score	188	66	195	118*
Balls bowled	–	–	84	–
Wickets	–	–	2	–
Bowling average	–	–	31.00	–
5 wickets in innings	–	–	0	–
10 wickets in match	–	–	0	–
Best bowling	–	–	1/7	–
Catches/stumpings	28/–	1/–	410/–	94/–
- Source: Cricinfo, 22 March 2009

Michael Henry Denness OBE (1 December 1940 – 19 April 2013) was a Scottish cricketer who played for England, Scotland, Kent and Essex.

Scotland did not have a representative international team at the time of Denness' career, so he could only play for England at Test and ODI level. He was the sixth player born in Scotland to play for England, after Gregor MacGregor, Alec Kennedy, Ian Peebles, David Larter and Eric Russell, but remains the only England captain to be born in Scotland (Douglas Jardine and Tony Greig had Scottish parents, but Jardine was born in Bombay and Greig in South Africa).

Denness later became an ICC match referee. He was one of the inaugural inductees into the Scottish Sports Hall of Fame and was a Wisden Cricketer of the Year in 1975. He was president of Kent County Cricket Club in 2012–13.

== Early life ==
Denness was born in Bellshill, North Lanarkshire, Scotland. His father was employed by W.D. & H.O. Wills, a tobacco importer and cigarette manufacturer and part of Imperial Tobacco.

After his family moved to Ayr, he was educated at Ayr Academy, where he played rugby with Ian Ure and Ian McLauchlan and played for Ayr Cricket Club at Cambusdoon, where he was coached by former Sussex player Charles Oakes. Denness was selected to play cricket for Scotland against Ireland in 1959 while still at school. Former Kent bowler Jimmy Allan was also in the Scotland team, and he suggested Denness's name to his former county. E. W. Swanton also met Denness in Ayr and put in a good word, and Les Ames invited Denness to a trial in 1961.

== Personal life ==
He published his autobiography, I Declare, in 1977. He was an inaugural member of both the Scottish Sports Hall of Fame and Scottish Cricket Hall of Fame.

He married his childhood sweetheart, Molly, in 1964. They had a son and two daughters. But they were later divorced.

== Domestic cricket career ==
Denness made his first-class debut for Kent against Essex in July 1962 but was dismissed by Jim Laker twice on a turning pitch for 0 and 3. But he quickly established himself in the team, scoring over 1,000 runs in the 1963 season. From 1964 he played as an opening batsman in partnership with Brian Luckhurst.

Denness became a tall, stylish right-handed batsman. He received his county cap in 1965 and Kent won the County Championship in 1970 for the first time since 1913. He succeeded Colin Cowdrey as Kent captain at the beginning of the 1972 cricket season, having often substituted for Cowdrey when he was on Test duty. Under his captaincy, the club won the John Player League three times (1972, 1973, 1976), the Benson & Hedges Cup twice (1973, 1976), and the Gillette Cup once (in 1974; also his benefit season). Denness was a Wisden Cricketer of the Year in 1975. After 5 years as captain, the club voted to replace him as captain by Asif Iqbal at the end of the 1976 season.

After being dismissed as captain at Kent, he moved to Essex in 1977, helping the club to win the County Championship and Benson & Hedges Cup in 1979. He retired after the 1980 English cricket season.

In all, he made 501 appearances in first-class cricket and 232 more in one day matches. He scored over 30,000 domestic runs in all, including 33 first-class hundreds and a best of 195, and six one-day centuries with a top score of 188 not out. He also took two wickets with his occasional bowling. He scored over 1,000 first-class runs in 14 English cricket seasons.

After he retired as a player at the end of the 1980 English cricket season Denness became 2nd XI captain at Essex and also worked as a coach. Outside cricket, he had jobs in finance, insurance and public relations.

== Test cricket ==
Denness played for England in 28 Tests and was the captain on 19 occasions, winning six, losing five and drawing eight matches. He made his Test debut in the final test against New Zealand at The Oval in 1969. After the cancellation of the 1970 South Africa tour, Denness played in the first match against the Rest of the World XI in 1970, before being dropped. He was vice-captain on the tour to India in 1972-3, captained by Tony Lewis, and he was appointed to replace Ray Illingworth as captain in September 1973.

As captain, he suffered a lack of support from Geoffrey Boycott, who had hoped to be appointed captain instead, and these tensions contributed to the downfall of Denness as a skipper. Boycott played in the first 6 Tests with Denness as captain, including the five matches in the 1–1 drawn series in the West Indies and the first Test of a 3–0 whitewash against India, during which Denness scored his first two Test centuries, but Boycott then refused to play under Denness and remained out of the Test team until 1977. After a 0–0 drawn three-match series against Pakistan at home in 1974, Boycott's boycott left England exposed in several matches against the fast bowling of Dennis Lillee and Jeff Thomson in the Ashes series in Australia in 1974-5. Denness dropped himself from the England team for the 4th Test at Sydney after scoring only 65 runs in 6 innings (6, 26, 2, 20, 8, 2) in the first three Tests, although he was selected again for the 5th Test in Adelaide after his replacement John Edrich was injured, and achieving his highest Test score of 188 at Melbourne in the 6th Test to win by an innings. The victory was little consolation, as Australia had already won four of the six matches in the series. While in Australia, Denness received an envelope that had been sent with the address "Mike Denness, cricketer". The letter inside read, "Should this reach you, the post office clearly thinks more of your ability than I do."

He scored another large Test century, 181, when the tour continued to New Zealand, and captained England in the 1975 Cricket World Cup, losing to Australia in the semi-final. He stepped down from the captaincy after losing the 1st Test of the 1975 Ashes series against Australia, at Edgbaston, by an innings (he had been dismissed for 3 and 8). He was replaced by Tony Greig and never played for England again.

Denness scored 1,667 runs in his 28 Tests, including four centuries. His seven accompanying half-centuries helped to leave him with a Test batting average of 39.69. His ODI career was less successful, playing only 12 matches and scoring 264 runs at an average of 29.33, with a best of 66.

== Match referee ==
Denness was appointed as an ICC match referee in 1996. He caused controversy after the Port Elizabeth Test between South Africa and the visiting Indians in 2001-2 when he sanctioned six Indian players, four including Virender Sehwag and Harbhajan Singh for excessive appealing, Sachin Tendulkar for alleged ball-tampering, and the captain Sourav Ganguly for failing to control his players. At first, India refused to accept the sanctions and named the players for the following Test match. The International Cricket Council responded by stripping the game of Test match status. Soon after, both the BCCI and ICC decided to establish a referee committee to verify Denness's conclusions. The match referee was heavily criticised for failing to explain his actions at a press conference, thus infuriating the Indian cricket establishment. The BCCI later decided to forget the incident on humanitarian grounds, after Denness underwent heart surgery.

In March 2002, Denness' role as a match referee came to an end, when the ICC rejected his bid for their newly formed Elite Panel of Referees, although he had been put forward by the ECB as a candidate.

== Later life ==
Denness became a committee member at Kent, and was chairman of cricket at Kent until he resigned in 2004 over a dispute involving Andrew Symonds. He was president of Kent County Cricket Club in 2012–13, Denness was appointed Officer of the Order of the British Empire (OBE) in the 2013 New Year Honours for services to sport.

Denness died at the age of 72, on 19 April 2013, after a long battle with cancer. He was survived by his partner, Doreen Wadlow, and his three children.

== See also ==
- List of Test cricketers born in non-Test playing nations

Sporting positions
Preceded by Ray Illingworth	English national cricket captain 1973/4–1975	Succeeded by Tony Greig
Preceded by Colin Cowdrey	Kent County Cricket Club captain 1972–1976	Succeeded by Asif Iqbal
Preceded by Ray Illingworth	England ODI Captain; 1973–1975	Succeeded by John Edrich
