= 1970 English cricket season =

The 1970 English cricket season was the 71st in which the County Championship had been an official competition. There was controversy when a tour by South Africa was forced to be abandoned because of mounting opposition to the apartheid policy perpetuated by the South African government. Five Tests were scheduled but the tour was officially cancelled at the request of Home Secretary James Callaghan. Instead, England played a highly successful series of unofficial Tests against a Rest of the World XI which was captained by Gary Sobers and included some of the best South African players such as Graeme Pollock, Eddie Barlow, Mike Procter and Barry Richards. These matches were promoted as Tests at the time, but were not recognised as such by the International Cricket Conference. Alan Jones played for England only in this series, and had the unfortunate experience of thinking that he had played in Tests only subsequently to discover that he had not. Kent won the County Championship title.

== Honours ==
- County Championship - Kent
- Gillette Cup - Lancashire
- Sunday League - Lancashire
- Minor Counties Championship - Bedfordshire
- Second XI Championship - Kent II
- Wisden - Jack Bond, Clive Lloyd, Brian Luckhurst, Glenn Turner, Roy Virgin

== Leading batsmen ==
1970 English cricket season – leading batsmen by average
Name	Innings	Runs	Highest	Average	100s
Garfield Sobers	32	1742	183	75.73	7
Tom Graveney	34	1316	114	62.66	2
Glenn Turner	46	2379	154*	61.00	10
Rohan Kanhai	37	1894	187*	57.39	7
Geoffrey Boycott	42	2051	260*	55.43	4

1970 English cricket season – leading batsmen by aggregate
Name	Innings	Runs	Highest	Average	100s
Glenn Turner	46	2379	154*	61.00	10
Roy Virgin	47	2223	178	47.29	7
Brian Bolus	53	2143	147*	48.70	2
Geoffrey Boycott	42	2051	260*	55.43	4
Pasty Harris	49	1914	120	42.53	3

== Leading bowlers ==
1970 English cricket season – leading bowlers by average
Name	Balls	Maidens	Runs	Wickets	Average
Keith Wheatley	641	31	253	15	16.86
Majid Khan	558	28	207	11	18.81
Don Shepherd	6741	420	2031	106	19.16
Barry Wood	1722	80	601	31	19.38
Norman Gifford	5795	331	2092	105	19.92

1970 English cricket season – leading bowlers by aggregate
Name	Balls	Maidens	Runs	Wickets	Average
Don Shepherd	6741	420	2031	106	19.16
Norman Gifford	5795	331	2092	105	19.92
Fred Titmus	6640	320	2804	105	26.70
Robin Hobbs	4416	178	2183	102	21.40
Garth McKenzie	4420	187	1860	91	20.43

== Annual reviews ==
- Playfair Cricket Annual 1971
- Wisden Cricketers' Almanack 1971
