= Neil Taylor (cricketer, born 1959) =

English cricketer

Neil Royston Taylor (born 21 July 1959 in Farnborough, Kent), is a former cricketer who played first-class and List A cricket for Kent and Sussex for 20 seasons between 1979 and 1998.

He made his debut in 1979 and was an opening batsman and an occasional off-spin bowler. He played in 325 first-class matches, scoring 19,031 runs at an average of 39.56 with 45 centuries. He later worked as Director of Cricket at St Dunstan's College and Epsom College.
