= Arthur Paish =

English cricketer

Personal information
- Born: 5 April 1874; Gloucester
- Died: 16 August 1948 (aged 74); Gloucester
- Batting: Left-handed

Domestic team information
- Years: Team
- 1898-1903: Gloucestershire
- Source: Cricinfo, 30 March 2014

Arthur Paish (5 April 1874 – 16 August 1948) was an English cricketer. He played first-class cricket for Gloucestershire for five seasons, as well as playing professionally for smaller clubs. Paish worked as groundsman and coach for Wagon Works for thirty years until his retirement in 1948.

== Career ==
Born is Gloucester on 5 April 1874, Paish grew up in Cheltenham and by 1893 he was playing cricket and rugby for Cheltenham. In 1895, Paish became a professional cricket player for Monmouth before joining Clifton's club. In 1898, Paish started playing for Gloucestershire Cricket Club, where he became a first-class bowler. At his peak in 1899, he had the best bowling average in first-class cricket at 18.93, beating W. G. Grace into second place. He was chosen to play for England against Australia in 1899, but declined as he had committed to a county match against the Australian side and did not want them to get used to his bowling. Paish played for Gloucestershire for a total of five seasons, between 1898 and 1903.

Paish spent seven years as a sports coach for Downside College, before returning to cricket as the professional player for Gloucester City Cricket Club. At the end of World War I, Paish took a role as groundsman coach for Wagon Works, where he remained until his retirement in April 1948. He was presented with a cheque for £131 (equivalent to £4,118 in 2025) and the Wagon Works held a benefit match in his honour, raising a further £96 (equivalent to £3,018 in 2025). Paish died suddenly at his home on 16 August 1948.
