= Bill Bradley (cricketer) =

English cricketer (1875–1944)

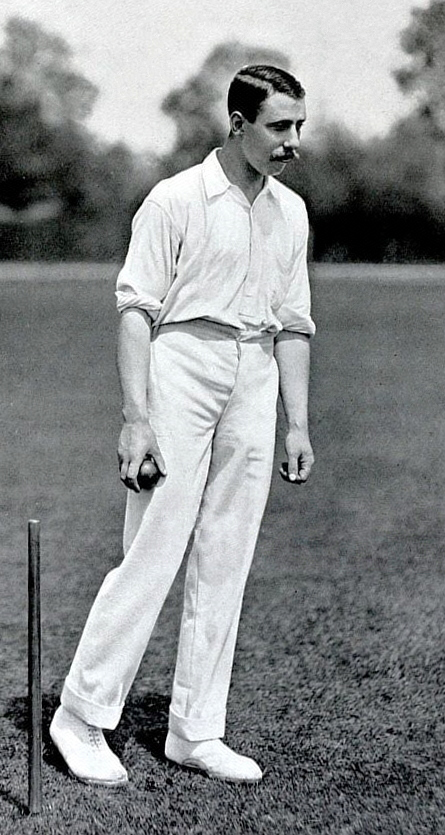
- Bradley c. 1900

Personal information
- Full name: Walter Morris Bradley
- Born: 2 January 1875; Lower Sydenham, Kent
- Died: 19 June 1944 (aged 69); Wandsworth Common
- Batting: Right-handed
- Bowling: Right arm fast

International information
- National side: England
- Test debut (cap 127): 17 July 1899 v Australia
- Last Test: 16 August 1899 v Australia

Domestic team information
- Years: Team
- 1895–1903: Kent
- 1903: London County

Career statistics
Competition	Test	First-class
Matches	2	144
Runs scored	23	956
Batting average	23.00	6.01
100s/50s	0/0	0/1
Top score	23*	67*
Balls bowled	625	28,440
Wickets	6	633
Bowling average	38.83	22.65
5 wickets in innings	1	44
10 wickets in match	0	10
Best bowling	5/67	9/87
Catches/stumpings	0/–	79/–
- Source: ESPNcricinfo, 10 September 2009

Walter Morris Bradley (2 January 1875 – 19 June 1944), known as Bill Bradley, was an English amateur cricketer who played in two Test matches in 1899. He played for Kent County Cricket Club between 1895 and 1903.

== Early life ==
Bradley was born at Sydenham in what was then part of Kent in 1875. He was the son of Walter George and Emma Amelia (Morris) Bradley; his father worked as a grocer, wine merchant and post master in Sydenham. Bradley was equated at Alleyn's School in Dulwich where he was in the school cricket XI for two seasons. He worked as a clerk for Lloyd's Register and played cricket for the firm where he was spotted and asked to play for Kent after taking six wickets in six balls in a match in 1895.

== Cricket ==
After taking nine wickets in a trial match for The Mote, Bradley made his county debut against Somerset at Blackheath. After taking a single wicket on debut he was retained for the matches in Canterbury Cricket Week, taking two five-wicket hauls in matches against Warwickshire and Yorkshire. He was awarded his county cap. According to his Wisden obituary, Bradley "became a protégé of Lord Harris", playing regularly for Kent between 1895 and 1903.

Bradley appeared most regularly between 1899 and 1902, making at least 23 first-class appearances in each season. He took 536 wickets for Kent during his career, taking 10 wickets in a match 10 times and taking three hat-tricks for the county. His final appearances for Kent were on the county's North American tour in September and October 1903 against the Gentlemen of Philadelphia.

A well built, attacking right arm fast bowler, Bradley bowled off a long run with a high action. He pitched the ball up and bowled long spells, attributes which earned him two Test caps in 1899. He excelled in his first, taking 5 for 67 against Joe Darling's Australians at Old Trafford but met with less success in his second, at the Oval. The most successful amateur bowler of that season, taking 156 wickets at 19.1 including two hat tricks, he took 624 wickets in 9 seasons at 22.64. An old fashioned tail ender, he scored only 906 first-class runs at just 6.09 with 67 coming in one innings against Yorkshire at Canterbury in 1897, an unbeaten innings amassed in just 45 minutes.

Bradley is one of only twenty cricketers to have taken a wicket with his first ball in a Test match, dismissing Australian Frank Laver.

As well as his 123 appearances for Kent, Bradley played in first-class matches for a variety of other teams. He appeared in six Gentlemen v Players matches and made his final first-class appearance in 1904 for GJV Weigall's XI against Cambridge University at Fenner's.

== Family and later life ==
Bradley worked in property management for the rest of his working life, managing Britannic House in Finsbury Circus. He was married to Alice Elizabeth Millyard in 1904; the couple had two sons, John Morris Bradley (b. 1905) and Robert Millyard Bradley (b. 1909). He was described by cricketer and journalist Edward Sewell as "a dedicated conversationalist" who retained his interest in club cricket and the Surrey Rifles Old Comrades Association. He watched cricket at Lord's regularly between the wars and had "an encyclopaedic knowledge of pubs, beer, brewers, opening times and pub landlords".

Bradley suffered from heart problems in later life. He died at his home on Wandsworth Common in South London in 1944 aged 69.

== Bibliography ==
- Carlaw, Derek (2020). Kent County Cricketers, A to Z: Part One (1806–1914) (PDF). Cardiff: ACS.
