= Brian Luckhurst =

English cricketer

Personal information
- Full name: Brian William Luckhurst
- Born: 5 February 1939; Sittingbourne, Kent
- Died: 1 March 2005 (aged 66); Kent
- Batting: Right-handed
- Bowling: Slow left-arm orthodox
- Role: Batsman

International information
- National side: England
- Test debut (cap 445): 27 November 1970 v Australia
- Last Test: 17 December 1974 v Australia
- ODI debut (cap 30): 1 January 1975 v Australia
- Last ODI: 9 March 1975 v New Zealand

Domestic team information
- Years: Team
- 1958–1976: Kent

Career statistics
Competition	Test	ODI	FC	LA
Matches	21	3	389	153
Runs scored	1,298	15	22,303	5,485
Batting average	36.05	5.00	38.12	40.62
100s/50s	4/5	0/0	48/115	7/39
Top score	131	14	215	142
Balls bowled	57	0	56,43	266
Wickets	1	–	64	8
Bowling average	32.00	–	42.87	22.87
5 wickets in innings	0	–	0	0
10 wickets in match	0	–	0	0
Best bowling	1/9	–	4/32	3/22
Catches/stumpings	14/–	0/–	392/–	62/–
- Source: CricInfo, 14 September 2008

Brian William Luckhurst (5 February 1939 – 1 March 2005) was an English cricketer, who played his entire county career for Kent County Cricket Club. He played for Kent from 1958 to 1976, usually opening the batting, then in 1985, in an emergency, played in one more match against the Australians. He was cricket manager from 1981 to 1986, then became cricket administrator. He went on to become president of the club, and held that position until his death. He played 355 matches for Kent and represented England in 21 Test matches and three one day internationals.

Over his entire career Luckhurst totalled 22,303 runs (average 38.12) in first-class cricket. He scored 1,000 runs in a season 14 times, his highest total for a season being 1,194 (average 47.85) in 1969. He scored 48 centuries, with a highest score of 215 against Derbyshire at Derby in 1973.

Although primarily a batsman, Luckhurst was technically an all-rounder. He took 64 wickets (average 42.87) with slow left arm spin (although he batted right-handed). On the rare occasions when he was called upon to bowl in a Test match, it was regarded as an indication that the result of the match was a foregone conclusion. He only took one Test wicket.

== Life and career ==
Luckhurst was born in Sittingbourne, Kent. Originally part of Kent team as a left-arm spinner, by the end of 1961, Kent were contemplating releasing him from their staff. Being given a contract for just one year, Luckhurst re-thought his strategy and worked on his batting and played in a side not performing well. He worked his way up the batting order to become a dependable opener.

In 1969 he amassed almost 2,000 runs and by the following year he 'debuted' against the Rest of the World in 1970, and made an unbeaten 113 in England's only victory in the "Test series", but the I.C.C. later cancelled the Test status of this series, and the runs scored were removed from his Test average. He debuted again in Australia in 1970–71, making 455 runs (average 56.87), including two centuries, and was named a Wisden Cricketer of the Year in 1971 for his efforts. With Geoff Boycott and John Edrich he added 624 runs for the first wicket at an average of 69.93, with two century and three half-century opening stands. He made 131 in the Second Test at Perth in its inaugural Test match, and so became the first batsman to make a Test century at the WACA. In a tour match against Northern New South Wales he made 111 and 45, but had to retire hurt with bruised fingers. He still batted in the Fifth Test at Melbourne, rescuing the first innings with 109, despite his damaged hands, but did not bat in the second innings. Missing the Sixth Test due to injury, Luckhurst made his return in the Seventh as Boycott was unavailable, having had his arm broken by Garth McKenzie. Luckhurst made a vital 58 as he and John Edrich (57) put on 94 for the first wicket to lay the foundations of England's second innings 302 when they were 80 runs behind. Australia were dismissed for 160 and England won the Test by 62 runs to regain The Ashes.

Unable to cope with the pace bowlers of the West Indies and Australia in the mid-1970s, Luckhust retired in 1976, but kept working at Canterbury as coach, then manager, then on youth development and finally as Club President.

He was married twice, to Elaine and Raye, had two sons with Elaine and a stepson. His autobiography was called Boot Boy to President.

Luckhurst died in March 2005, in Kent, from oesophageal cancer, at the age of 66.
