= Jack Bryan =

English cricketer (1896–1985)

Personal information
- Full name: John Lindsay Bryan
- Born: 26 May 1896; Beckenham, Kent
- Died: 23 April 1985 (aged 88); Eastbourne, Sussex
- Batting: Left-handed
- Bowling: Right-arm leg-break
- Role: Opening batsman
- Relatives: Ronnie Bryan (brother); Godfrey Bryan (brother)

Domestic team information
- Years: Team
- 1919–1932: Kent
- 1921: Cambridge University

Career statistics
| Competition | First-class |
|---|---|
| Matches | 165 |
| Runs scored | 8,702 |
| Batting average | 36.25 |
| 100s/50s | 17/40 |
| Top score | 236 |
| Balls bowled | 862 |
| Wickets | 15 |
| Bowling average | 45.00 |
| 5 wickets in innings | 0 |
| 10 wickets in match | 0 |
| Best bowling | 2/18 |
| Catches/stumpings | 89/– |
- Source: CricInfo, 1 December 2008

John Lindsay Bryan MC (26 May 1896 – 23 April 1985) was an English schoolteacher and cricketer who played for Cambridge University and Kent County Cricket Club. Bryan served in the British Army in both World War I and World War II and won the Military Cross in 1918.

He played for Kent alongside two of his brothers and toured Australia with the England cricket team in 1924/25. He was named as one of Wisden's five Cricketers of the Year in 1922.

== Early life ==
Bryan was born in Beckenham in Kent, the oldest son of Lindsay and Emily Bryan. His father was a solicitor. Bryan attended St Andrews' Preparatory School in Eastbourne where he captained the school Cricket XI, before winning an academic scholarship to Rugby School in 1911. He captained the Rugby Cricket XI in August 1914 and opened the batting for Lord's Schools against the Rest with George Whitehead who went on the play two matches for Kent later the same month.

Bryan also played rugby at school and represented Rugby in racquets. He was described by Wisden as "one among many brilliant public school cricketers". He was a member of the Officers' Training Corps at Rugby.

== Military service ==
At the start of World War I Bryan volunteered for service with the Honourable Artillery Company (HAC), joining as a Private on 26 August 1914. He served with the HAC in Northern France in 1914 and was wounded by shellfire in November 1914 towards the end of the First Battle of Ypres and evacuated to England. He rejoined the HAC in January 1915 in London but in February was commissioned as a 2nd Lieutenant in the 2/5th Manchester Regiment, the regiment his father had been a Lieutenant colonel in.

After training on a machine gun course, he served at Gallipoli from September 1915 as Machine-Gun Officer of the 5th Manchester's until he was evacuated in October 1915 suffering from jaundice. The Manchester's moved to Egypt after their withdrawal from Gallipoli and Bryan served in the 127th Brigade Machine Gun Company at Abu Mena and the Suez Canal. He helped protect the railway built from El Qantara, Egypt to El Arish as part of the preparations for the Sinai and Palestine Campaign.

In 1917 Bryan left Egypt for the Western Front, serving in the Somme area where he suffered from pyrexia and was hospitalised for a time. He served on the front line in France and Belgium throughout 1917 and 1918. He was promoted to lieutenant in August 1917 and acting captain in March 1918 during the German spring offensive. He saw action during the Second Battle of the Somme in 1918 and was awarded the Military Cross for the way he led his machine guns at Miraumont in August 1918, although Bryan "played down the award". He saw action throughout the period until the end of the war and was appointed as a company commander during this period.

After the Armistice, Bryan was appointed acting major in the run up to demobilisation. He relinquished his rank in May 1919 but remained a captain in the Territorial Force for some time.

In September 1939 Bryan re-joined the army at the outbreak of World War II. He served as an Adjutant with the Manchester Regiment in France during 1940 and was evacuated from Dunkirk alongside his brother Ronnie, being Mentioned in Dispatches during the action. He became an instructor at the Eastern Command Infantry Company Commanders School with the rank of acting Major. From 1942 he served in the Territorial Army Reserve in a variety of roles for the rest of the war. He gave up his commission in 1949.

== Cricketing career ==
Bryan was a left-handed opening batsman. He played for Kent's Second XI in 1914 as well as for the Club and Ground team before enlisting in the army at the start of World War I. He made his first-class cricket debut for LG Robinson's XI against the Australian Imperial Force Touring XI at Old Buckenham Hall Cricket Ground in Norfolk in May 1919 before making his Kent First XI debut towards the end of August against Lancashire at the Bat and Ball Ground in Gravesend.

He went up to Cambridge University in 1919, reading History and Maths at St John's College, graduating in 1921. He was not able to gain a place in the University cricket team in 1920 but did gain his cricket Blue in 1921, playing 11 first-class matches for the team. Meanwhile, he had been awarded his Kent cap in 1920 and scored 553 runs for the country during the season.

The 1921 season was Bryan's only full season of cricket as his job as a teacher prevented him playing regularly outside of the school holidays thereafter. He scored 1,858 runs at an average of 50.21 including five centuries, three for Cambridge and two for Kent. His highest score of 231 was made for Cambridge against Surrey at The Oval and in a series of eight matches he scored over 1,000 of his runs. He was awarded the accolade of being named as one of Wisden's five Cricketers of the Year in the 1922 edition.

From 1922 onwards Bryan continued to appear for Kent during the school holidays. He was, according to Wisden, "so highly ... regarded" that he was selected three times for the Gentlemen v Players fixture before he had played a match during the season. In 1924 he took leave of absence from his teaching post to travel with the England team to Australia over the 1924–25 English winter. He played in the non-first-class match in Ceylon and in first-class matches against Australian State cricket teams and an Australian XI but could not break into the Test team.

Bryan was well-regarded as an opening batsman. His Wisden obituary calls him a "a model opening bat" who aimed to "lay a good foundation to the innings" before attacking It regarded him as a "potentially great" cricketer who was a "beautiful field(er)" and "bowled slow leg-breaks and googlies" He scored over 8,700 runs in first-class cricket including 17 centuries. His highest score was 236 runs made against Hampshire in 1923 at Canterbury, an innings Wisden singled out as an example of his approach to batting. He played 119 times for Kent and 11 times for Cambridge as well as making appearances for teams such as the Gentlemen and, eight times, MCC.

He played his final match for Kent in August 1932 against Middlesex at Lord's before playing one more first-class match in 1933 for H. D. G. Leveson Gower's XI against Cambridge University at Eastbourne. He continued to play club cricket until the 1950s for Eastbourne and coached cricket in his teaching post.

== Personal life and family ==
Bryan worked as a school teacher at his old school, St Andrew's, in Eastbourne from 1922. He married Irene Pocock in March 1927 and together they had one son. He was Master-in-Charge of cricket at the school and was, for a term, Headmaster before having to step down due to his wife's ill-health. He continued to be associated with the school after his retirement.

Two of his brothers, Ronnie and Godfrey, also played first-class cricket for Kent. All three played in just one match together for the county, against Lancashire at Dover in August 1925, with Jack captaining the Kent team. Ronnie shared the Kent captaincy with Bryan Valentine in 1937.

Bryan died after a short illness at Eastbourne in 1985 aged 88, at the time the oldest living Kent player and the last survivor of the Cambridge team of 1922 and the England touring team of 1924/25.
