= Ealham =

Ealham is a surname of English origin. Notable people with the surname include:

- Alan Ealham (born 1944), English cricketer
- Chris Ealham (born 1965), British historian and hispanist
- Mark Ealham (born 27 August 1969), English cricketer in One Day International
