= Godfrey Bryan =

English cricketer (1902–1991)

Personal information
- Full name: Godfrey James Bryan
- Born: 29 December 1902; Beckenham, Kent
- Died: 24 March 1991 (aged 88); Canterbury, Kent
- Batting: Left-handed
- Bowling: Right-arm medium
- Role: Batsman
- Relatives: Jack Bryan (brother); Ronnie Bryan (brother)

Domestic team information
- Years: Team
- 1920–1933: Kent
- 1923–1951: Army
- 1924: Combined Services
- First-class debut: 30 August 1920 Kent v Nottinghamshire
- Last First-class: 1 June 1935 Army v Cambridge University

Career statistics
Competition	First-class
Matches	70
Runs scored	3,192
Batting average	30.11
100s/50s	6/16
Top score	229
Balls bowled	2,879
Wickets	35
Bowling average	50.08
5 wickets in innings	1
10 wickets in match	0
Best bowling	5/148
Catches/stumpings	46/–
- Source: CricInfo, 16 December 2007

Brigadier Godfrey James Bryan CBE (29 December 1902 – 24 March 1991) was an English army officer and cricketer. A left-handed batsman, he played first-class cricket between 1920 and 1935 for Kent County Cricket Club and the Army cricket team. His brothers Jack and Ronnie also played for Kent, though Godfrey was considered as "possibly the most talented" of the three.

Bryan rose to the rank of brigadier in the British Army, serving with the Royal Engineers. He served during World War II and was stationed in Malaya during the Malayan Emergency.

== Early life ==
Bryan was born in Beckenham in Kent, the son of Lindsay and Emily Bryan. His father was a solicitor. Bryan showed an early talent for cricket when playing at Wellington College. After making a string of centuries for the school XI he was referred to by Wisden Cricketers' Almanack as the public school batsman of the year who "did wonders in school matches" He made his first-class cricket debut for Kent County Cricket Club in a County Championship match against Nottinghamshire later in the same season, aged just 17, making an immediate impact by scoring a maiden first-class century in the match.

== Cricket career ==
Bryan attending the Royal Military Academy, Woolwich between 1921 and 1922, playing cricket in both years against Sandhurst. The academy was in Kent and Bryan became a regular member of the Kent county team during the 1921 season, playing nine County Championship matches as well as a match against the touring Australians. His top score of the year was 179 against Hampshire, adding 208 runs in only two hours with Lionel Hedges. He played 13 times for Kent the following year, after which his Army career meant that his availability for county cricket was limited.

In 1922 Bryan made his first appearance for the Royal Engineers Cricket Club in the annual Sappers vs Gunners match against the Royal Artillery. Bryan also made his debut for the British Army cricket team in the same year and played four times for Kent. The Army cricket team had first-class cricket status during the inter-war period and Bryan was able to play for both the Army and a few times for Kent in most years until the end of the 1929 season. He continued to play for the Army and the Royal Engineers until 1951, taking part in 14 Gunners vs Sappers matches.

Bryan made only three first-class appearances after 1929, playing his final match for Kent in 1933 against Derbyshire and his final first-classapperance in 1935 for the Army against Cambridge University. He played in a total of 70 first-class matches, scoring 3,192 runs and in club cricket played for Beckenham Cricket Club. In 1925 he played alongside both of his brothers for Kent against Lancashire, the only time all three played in the same team.

== Military career ==
After attending Royal Military Academy, Woolwich in 1921 and 1922, Bryan joined the Royal Engineers. In the early years of the 1930s he was stationed in the Far East, where he played cricket for the Straits Settlements, United Services and Malaya Command between 1930 and 1932. He was stationed again in Malaya during the late 1930s and played for Malaya and Straits Settlements.

He rose to the rank of Brigadier and was stationed in Malaya during the Malayan Emergency.

== Family and later life ==
Two of his brothers, Jack and Ronnie, also played first-class cricket for Kent. Bryan died at Canterbury in 1991 aged 88.

== Bibliography ==
- Carlaw, Derek (2020). Kent County Cricketers, A to Z: Part Two (1919–1939) (PDF). Cardiff: ACS.
