= Geoffrey Legge =

English cricketer (1903–1940)

Personal information
- Full name: Geoffrey Bevington Legge
- Born: 26 January 1903; Bromley, Kent, England
- Died: 21 November 1940 (aged 37); Brampford Speke, Devon, England
- Batting: Right-handed
- Bowling: Right arm leg break

International information
- National side: England
- Test debut (cap 228): 24 December 1927 v South Africa
- Last Test: 24 February 1930 v New Zealand

Domestic team information
- Years: Team
- 1924–1931: Kent
- 1925–1926: Oxford University

Career statistics
| Competition | Tests | First-class |
|---|---|---|
| Matches | 5 | 147 |
| Runs scored | 299 | 4,955 |
| Batting average | 49.83 | 24.89 |
| 100s/50s | 1/0 | 7/16 |
| Top score | 196 | 196 |
| Balls bowled | 30 | 179 |
| Wickets | 0 | 8 |
| Bowling average | – | 22.62 |
| 5 wickets in innings | – | 0 |
| 10 wickets in match | – | 0 |
| Best bowling | – | 3/23 |
| Catches/stumpings | 1/– | 123/– |
- Source: Cricinfo, 21 March 2009

Geoffrey Bevington Legge (26 January 1903 – 21 November 1940) was an English first-class cricketer who played in five Test matches between 1927 and 1930. He was born at Bromley, Kent and died at Brampford Speke, Devon in a flying accident while serving in the Fleet Air Arm during World War II.

== Family and background ==
Legge was the elder son of Henry B. Legge, a "paper agent", and his wife Edith. The couple are listed in the 1911 census as living at Sundridge Avenue, Bromley, Kent, with the family of five supplemented by five live-in servants. By the time of Geoffrey Legge's marriage on 19 September 1929 to Rosemary Frost, the family is recorded as living at Baston Manor, Hayes, Kent. Rosemary Frost was a fine tennis player, who beat Suzanne Lenglen at Queen's in one final.

== Early cricket and Oxford ==
Legge was educated at Malvern, where he was captain of the cricket team in 1922. Wisden Cricketers' Almanack's annual review of public school cricket praised his "beautiful off-side strokes" and added: "Legge was an excellent captain who knew how to get the best out of his bowlers, and had a sound control of his eleven in the field."

Going to Brasenose College, Oxford University, Legge played in one of the trial matches for the Oxford University cricket team in both 1923 and 1924 but did not score well and was not then picked for any of the university side's first-class matches in those seasons. In 1924 he was given a second chance by being selected for two first-class games by Kent, the second of which was against Oxford University, but he did not take the opportunity, failing to reach double figures in any of his four innings in these games.

Once again in the 1925 trial matches for the Oxford side, Legge failed, and he was not selected for the first three first-class matches played by the University. He finally made his debut in the fourth game, against Worcestershire and hit 120, reaching his century in two hours; he followed that up with 40 in the second innings. He achieved little in the next two matches, but was still awarded his Blue with four weeks to go before the University Match after just three matches for the university. The selection was justified, as Legge topped the Oxford batting averages for the season and in the match against Cambridge scored 38 and 15 as an Oxford side packed with batsmen held out for a draw against an apparently superior Cambridge side.

In 1926, Legge was the Oxford captain and was top of the averages again, but his season was disrupted first by the General Strike, which caused matches to be abandoned, and then by his involvement in a car accident in which he injured his hand: "A most unfortunate affair," Wisden wrote. Legge had a taste for fast cars and was a member of the Oxford motor racing team, which was how the accident happened. He was recovered in time to lead his team in the University Match which was a low-scoring game won narrowly by Cambridge; Legge scored 14 and 16.

== County and Test cricket ==
Legge played virtually the full season for Kent in 1927, making more than 900 runs at an average of more than 30 runs per innings, with two centuries, though in a very strong batting side he often batted as low as No 7.

In the winter of 1927/28, MCC sent a cricket team to South Africa; the team, Wisden noted, was scarcely representative of top-class English cricket, since Jack Hobbs, Patsy Hendren, Maurice Tate, Harold Larwood and several prominent amateurs were either not selected or declined to go. Legge was one of half a dozen amateur players, and equalled his then-highest score when he made 120 against Orange Free State. That and other decent scores in first-class matches led to his selection for the first Test, but he failed to score in his only innings, being one of eight England batsmen who contributed only 13 runs between them to a match-winning score of 313. He lost his place for the next match in the series and did not regain it.

Back in England for the 1928 season, Legge took on the captaincy of Kent and led the county to second place in the County Championship behind Lancashire, to a large extent because of a phenomenal bowling season for Tich Freeman, who took more than 300 first-class wickets in all matches, a record for a single season that is likely never to be broken. Legge himself played regularly but was less successful as a batsman than he had been in previous years, scoring 891 runs but at a reduced average of 21.73. The following season his aggregate advanced a little to 929 runs but because Kent played fewer matches his average improved to 25.10. For the first three months of the 1929 season, Kent were in contention for their first County Championship success since 1913, but of the last 10 matches only one was won, and they finished eighth.

In July 1929 Legge was picked for the England tour of New Zealand in 1929–30. He and Rosemary Frost were married in September 1929, and they went on the tour together as their honeymoon. The tour of New Zealand was one of two tours organised that winter by Marylebone Cricket Club (MCC), following the 1926 Imperial Cricket Conference decision to extend Test cricket, and teams of mixed ability – some established Test players, some amateurs and county professionals – toured both West Indies and New Zealand that winter. The New Zealand team played first-class matches in Australia before arriving in New Zealand in December 1929. The team was scheduled to play three Test matches in New Zealand; in the event, the third match, at Eden Park, Auckland, was restricted by rain to a single day, so a fourth game, also at Auckland, was played. Legge played in all four Tests, making little impact in the first three; in the fourth game, however, he made 196, the highest score of the series and the highest of his own first-class cricket career. In minor matches on the tour, Legge had some success with his occasional leg-spin bowling: he took six Southland wickets for 24 runs in an innings in one two-day game and nine in the game against Manawatu.

Despite his success in New Zealand and in his last Test innings, Legge was not picked for any representative matches back in England in 1930, and he had a poor season with the bat for Kent, failing to reach 50 in any innings and averaging just 14. At the end of the 1930 season he resigned from the captaincy of Kent for "business reasons", and he played only one further first-class game, a single match for Kent against the New Zealanders at the end of the 1931 season, when he batted at No 10 and was run out for 1.

== After cricket ==
As a businessman, Legge acquired an airplane and flew many times on business to Europe; at the outbreak of war in 1939, he joined the Royal Navy's flying arm, the Fleet Air Arm, and was promoted to Lieutenant-Commander just six days before his death in a flying accident in Devon.

Sporting positions
| Preceded by John Evans | Kent County Cricket Club captain 1928–1930 | Succeeded by Percy Chapman and Bryan Valentine |
