= Ronnie Bryan =

English cricketer & soldier (1898–1970)

Ronald Bryan
Personal information
- Full name: Ronald Thurston Bryan
- Born: 30 July 1898; Beckenham, Kent
- Died: 27 July 1970 (aged 71); Pevensey Bay, Sussex
- Batting: Left-handed
- Bowling: Right-arm leg spin
- Role: Batsman
- Relatives: Jack Bryan (brother); Godfrey Bryan

Domestic team information
- Years: Team
- 1920–1937: Kent

Career statistics
| Competition | First-class |
|---|---|
| Matches | 40 |
| Runs scored | 1,154 |
| Batting average | 22.62 |
| 100s/50s | 0/7 |
| Top score | 89* |
| Balls bowled | 42 |
| Wickets | 1 |
| Bowling average | 22.00 |
| 5 wickets in innings | 0 |
| 10 wickets in match | 0 |
| Best bowling | 1/9 |
| Catches/stumpings | 30/– |
- Source: CricInfo, 19 July 2009

Ronald Thurston Bryan (30 July 1898 – 27 July 1970) was an English amateur cricketer and soldier who played first-class cricket for Kent County Cricket Club. He captained Kent for three months in 1937 and served in both World War I and World War II. He worked professionally for Lloyds Bank.

== Early life ==
Bryan was born in Beckenham in Kent, the second son of Lindsay and Emily Bryan. His father was a solicitor. Bryan attended St Andrews' Preparatory School in Eastbourne before following his brother Jack on to Rugby School. He was in the Cricket XI from 1913 to 1915, initially as a bowler.

== Military service ==
At the outbreak of World War I Bryan was still at school and was too young to enlist. In 1915, aged 17, he joined the Territorial Force, being awarded a commission as a 2nd Lieutenant in the 5th Battalion, the Manchester Regiment, the same battalion his brother Jack was serving in and the brother's father had been a Lieutenant-colonel in. He was initially posted to a Provisional Battalion as he was too young to serve overseas. He was promoted to Lieutenant in 1917 and, in January 1918, posted to the main complement of the battalion, now old enough to serve on the front line.

Bryan arrived on the Western Front in France in April 1918 and was attached to the Royal Sussex Regiment at Friville in the Somme sector. He saw action in the Hundred Days Offensive and was in action until the end of the war. After the Armistice he volunteered for service in the Army of Occupation on the Rhine and was stationed in Germany until the Treaty of Versailles was signed in 1919 and was transferred to the Territorial Reserve in February 1921.

At the outbreak of World War II Bryan was reappointed to the Reserve of Officers before seeing action with the Manchester Regiment in France. He was evacuated from Dunkirk with the Manchesters alongside his brother Jack. In 1942 he was appointed Lieutenant in the Royal Armoured Corps. He was awarded a Bronze Star in 1948, a US award which could be awarded to anyone who had served with US forces.

== Cricket career ==
Bryan was a left-handed batsman. He played with his brother Jack for Kent's Second XI in 1914 as well as for the Club and Ground team before the start of World War I. He made his first-class cricket debut for Kent against Warwickshire at Edgbaston in June 1920, going on to play five times for the country during the 1920 season as well as six times for the Second XI in the Minor Counties Championship.

After being stood down from the Army in early 1921 Bryan joined Lloyds Bank and was only able to play cricket during his annual holiday. He made six appearances for Kent in each of 1923 and 1924, two in 1925 and one in 1928 as well as playing for the Club Cricket Conference a number of times, including against touring New Zealand, West Indies and South African national teams. He also played regularly for the Lloyds Bank team and for Beckenham Cricket Club.

In 1937 Bryan took three months leave from work and was appointed joint captain of Kent alongside Bryan Valentine. He played 20 matches for Kent during the season, having not played first-class cricket since 1928 as Kent tried to replace Percy Chapman as captain. These were the final first-class appearances of Bryan's career.

== Family and later life ==
Bryan was one of three left-handed brothers who all played for Kent. He played only once in a first-class match alongside Jack and Godfrey, in 1925 against Lancashire at Dover. He died in Pevensey Bay in Sussex in 1970 aged 71.

Sporting positions
| Preceded by Percy Chapman, Ian Akers-Douglas and Bryan Valentine | Kent County Cricket Club captain 1937; Jointly with Bryan Valentine | Succeeded by Gerry Chalk |
