= Ian Akers-Douglas =

English cricketer

Personal information
- Full name: Ian Stanley Akers-Douglas
- Born: 16 November 1909; Kensington, London
- Died: 16 December 1952 (aged 43); Frant, Sussex
- Batting: Right-handed
- Relatives: Stanley Christopherson (grandfather)

Domestic team information
- Years: Team
- 1929–1930: Oxford University
- 1929–1938: Kent

Career statistics
Competition	First-class
Matches	60
Runs scored	1,965
Batting average	23.67
100s/50s	2/8
Top score	123
Balls bowled	125
Wickets	4
Bowling average	25.00
5 wickets in innings	0
10 wickets in match	0
Best bowling	2/20
Catches/stumpings	12/–
- Source: CricInfo, 17 March 2017

Ian Stanley Akers-Douglas (16 November 1909 – 16 December 1952) was an English amateur cricketer and rackets player. He was a right-handed batsman who played first-class cricket for Oxford University and Kent County Cricket Club between 1929 and 1938. He was born in Kensington and died at his home in Frant.

Akers-Douglas' father was the second son of Aretas Akers-Douglas, 1st Viscount Chilston. His maternal grandfather was Stanley Christopherson, who played cricket once for England, and his great-uncle was Percy Christopherson who played twice for Kent. He was educated at Eton College and Christ Church, Oxford. His cricketing career began with one match for the Kent Second XI in the 1928 Minor Counties Championship before making his first-class debut for Oxford University in 1929. He played in three matches for the university before making his Kent debut in the same summer against Warwickshire. He played four further County Championship matches for the team in the 1929 season.

Akers-Douglas returned to play for Oxford in 1930 and made four appearances for Kent in the County Championship during the 1930 season. He spent 1931 and 1933 out of the team, save for one single first-class match, though 1932 saw him score his debut century, his career-best first-class score of 123. He played frequently during 1934 and 1936, but in 1935, 1937 and 1938 played just a single first-class game in each year. Following the close of the 1938 season, Akers-Douglas played just one further cricket match for Kent, against the Rest of England.

Akers-Douglas was also a champion rackets player. He won the British Open Championship in 1933 and the British Amateur Championship in 1933, 1933 and 1934, and was runner-up in the Amateur Championship in 1930, 1931, 1935, 1938 and 1946.

Akers-Douglas was married twice. His first marriage, to Joan Holroyd Toms, in 1933, produced a daughter, and ended in divorce in 1943, in which it was alleged his wife had committed adultery with Geoffrey Lowndes. He married Phyllis Rosemary Parsons in 1945, and they had a son and a daughter. He died as a result of a shooting accident at his home in December 1952. His cousin Eric Akers-Douglas, 3rd Viscount Chilston, died in 1982 without children, so Ian Akers-Douglas' son Alastair (born 1946) became 4th Viscount Chilston.

== Bibliography ==
- Carlaw, Derek (2020). Kent County Cricketers, A to Z: Part One (1806–1914) (PDF). Cardiff: ACS.

Sporting positions
Preceded by Percy Chapman and Bryan Valentine	Kent County Cricket Club captain 1936 (jointly with Percy Chapman and Bryan Valentine)	Succeeded by Ronnie Bryan and Bryan Valentine
