= Bryan Valentine =

English cricketer

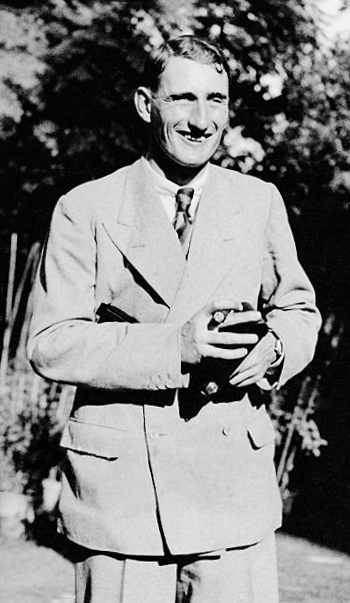
- Valentine in 1933

Personal information
- Full name: Bryan Herbert Valentine
- Born: 17 January 1908; Blackheath, Kent, England
- Died: 2 February 1983 (aged 75); Otford, Kent, England
- Batting: Right-handed
- Bowling: Right-arm medium
- Relatives: Carol Valentine (sister)

International information
- National side: England
- Test debut (cap 272): 15 December 1933 v India
- Last Test: 14 March 1939 v South Africa

Domestic team information
- Years: Team
- 1927–1948: Kent
- 1928–1929: Cambridge University

Career statistics
Competition	Test	First-class
Matches	7	399
Runs scored	454	18,306
Batting average	64.85	30.15
100s/50s	2/1	35/90
Top score	136	242
Balls bowled	0	1,933
Wickets	–	27
Bowling average	–	41.66
5 wickets in innings	–	0
10 wickets in match	–	0
Best bowling	–	3/58
Catches/stumpings	2/–	289/–
- Source: ESPNcricinfo, 19 July 2009

Bryan Herbert Valentine MC (17 January 1908 – 2 February 1983) was an English cricketer who played in seven Test matches between 1933 and 1939. He was born at Blackheath, London and died at Otford, Kent.

Although he played only seven Tests, his Test batting average of 64.85, including two centuries and one fifty, is twice his overall first-class cricket record of 30.15 with 35 centuries and 90 fifties in 399 first-class matches. He played in just two Test series, scoring 179 runs in two tests against India on the 1933/34 tour with a best of 136 in less than 3 hours on debut in Bombay. He amassed 275 runs in 5 matches against South Africa on the 1938/39 MCC tour, including a score of 112 in 2 hours, 40 minutes in Cape Town in the Second Test of the series. His final Test was the famous 'timeless test' in Durban which saw England's last innings cut short at 654/5 when they were forced to catch the boat home after 10 days of cricket. Valentine ended the match on 4 not out.

Valentine was educated at Lockers Park School in Hertfordshire, Repton School and Pembroke College, Cambridge. He represented Cambridge University at cricket in 1928 and 1929, and also won a Blue for soccer. His long career at Kent County Cricket Club as a right-handed batsman and occasional medium pacer spanned two decades from 1927 to 1948. He was awarded his Kent cap in 1931 and captained the county on occasion during the 1930s in the absence of Percy Chapman; in 1937 he shared the captaincy with Ronnie Bryan. Following Gerry Chalk's death in World War II Valentine captained Kent again between 1946 and 1948 before being succeeded by David Clark.

An attacking batsman whose defence improved with experience in the first-class arena, he was particularly strong through the legside but his Test appearances were limited by the strength of the England team at the time. His highest score, 242, was made for Kent against Leicestershire at Oakham in 1938. A limited bowler, he was an excellent all round fielder equally at home in the covers or catching close to the wicket.

During World War II Valentine served with the Royal West Kent Regiment and was awarded the Military Cross "in recognition of gallant and distinguished services in North Africa". He returned to cricket despite being badly wounded during hostilities. He was President of Kent County Cricket Club in 1967 and served on the cricket committee for many years.

His sister, Carol, also played test cricket for England women's cricket team.

== Bibliography ==
- Carlaw, Derek (2020). Kent County Cricketers, A to Z: Part Two (1919–1939) (PDF). Cardiff: ACS.

Sporting positions
Preceded by Geoffrey Legge	Kent County Cricket Club captain 1931–1937; Captaincy shared with Percy Chapman until 1936, Ian Akers-Douglas in 1936 and Ronnie Bryan in 1937	Succeeded by Gerry Chalk
Preceded by Gerry Chalk	Kent County Cricket Club captain 1946–1948	Succeeded by David Clark
