= Doug Wright (cricketer) =

English cricketer (1914–1998)

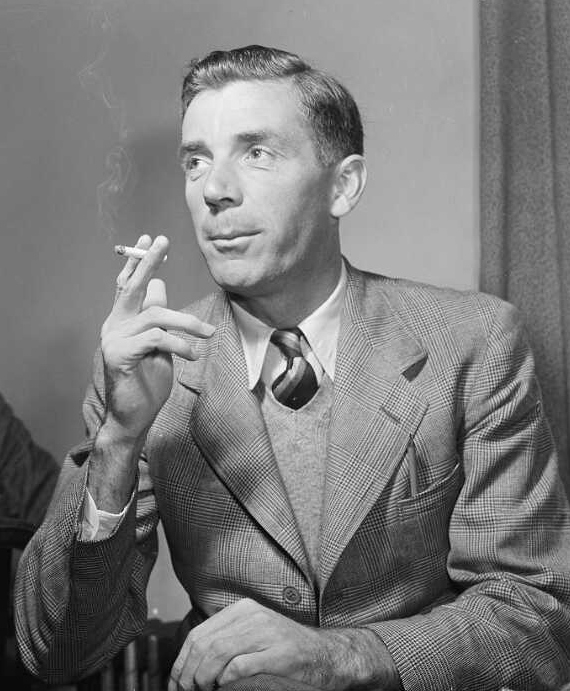
- Wright in 1951

Personal information
- Full name: Douglas Vivian Parson Wright
- Born: 21 August 1914; Sidcup, Kent
- Died: 13 November 1998 (aged 84); Canterbury, Kent
- Batting: Right-handed
- Bowling: Right-arm leg break/medium pace

International information
- National side: England
- Test debut (cap 302): 10 June 1938 v Australia
- Last Test: 28 March 1951 v New Zealand

Domestic team information
- Years: Team
- 1932–1957: Kent

Career statistics
Competition	Test	First-class
Matches	34	497
Runs scored	289	5,903
Batting average	11.11	12.34
100s/50s	0/0	0/16
Top score	45	84*
Balls bowled	8,135	92,918
Wickets	108	2,056
Bowling average	39.11	23.98
5 wickets in innings	6	150
10 wickets in match	1	42
Best bowling	7/105	9/47
Catches/stumpings	10/–	182/–
- Source: CricketArchive, 20 March 2026

Douglas Vivian Parson Wright (21 August 1914 – 13 November 1998) was an English cricketer who played for England in 34 Test matches from 1938 to 1950/51. He played first-class cricket for Kent in twenty seasons between 1932 and 1957. He was the club's first professional captain from late 1953 to 1956.

Wright was a leg-spinner, but had a run-up as long as pace bowlers of his day—though actually consisting of leaps or hops, rather than steps—and actually delivered the ball at medium pace. Combined with his vigorous back-of-the-hand spin, Wright on his best days was one of the most difficult to play of all English bowlers. However, as would be expected of a bowler trying to spin the ball at such a quick pace, he could also be expensive.

== Life and career ==
Wright's early career with Kent was as understudy to Tich Freeman, whom he succeeded in 1936. He achieved two hat-tricks in 1937, and was selected for his England debut in 1938. Playing against Australia, he bowled well on a dusty wicket at Headingley, although his figures would have been better but for fielding errors. In the winter of 1938/39, he was a member of the MCC team to South Africa.

In 1939, Wright advanced so much that he was named one of the Wisden Cricketers of the Year and produced two sensational performances: match figures of 16/80 against Somerset; and 9/47 on a dusty wicket at Bristol, against Gloucestershire. Wright also batted well enough to score 490 runs in the season, but his batting declined after World War II. Though he became fixed amongst the tail order, he did make 66 at number 11 in 1955 against Warwickshire.

Wright served in the British Army during the War, and returned to Kent in 1946. He was chosen for the 1946/47 Ashes tour. He took 23 wickets, but had little support, and England were outclassed. His bowling analysis at the Sydney Cricket Ground was 7/102 in the Test, although on the same track a few weeks earlier, he had returned 1/169; emphasising his unreliable and freakish bowling nature.

With dry pitches suiting him, 1947 proved to be Wright's best season. He took 177 wickets, including 10/175 against South Africa at Lord's. However, in the following two seasons, he was plagued by injury and Wright did little in the Tests, but he showed many times that he was still the most dangerous English bowler in dry weather – especially in terms of ability to dismiss top batsmen.

In order to regain supremacy in international cricket, England captains began to change to tactics that emphasised reducing the ability for batsmen to score. In this context, Wright was an expensive luxury – notably when his inaccuracy lost a tight game at the MCG that winter in the 1950-51 Ashes series. Even then he did dismiss Australia's best batsmen, Hassett and Harvey, in the second Australian innings of the fifth Test which England won.

In 1951, Wright was never at his best in a damp summer, and on the hard wickets of 1952 his wickets cost six runs more than in 1947 or 1949. However, in August 1953, Wright became Kent's first professional captain, and in contrast to Eric Hollies, the job seemed to help his bowling, for in 1954 with pitches totally unsuited he took 105 wickets and, in 1955, he had one of his best seasons. At the Oval, he led Kent to an unexpected victory over Surrey when that county appeared certain to win.

In 1956, Wright did not take fifty wickets, though once against Middlesex he bowled at his best: Wisden commented, "most of his eight victims had not been born when Wright entered first-class cricket twenty-four years ago and they had no answer to his whipping leg-breaks and googlies".

Wright set a record career total of seven hat-tricks.

At the beginning of 1957, Wright said he did not wish to be considered for the captaincy in his second benefit year, and in mid-July he decided to retire. A review of his career was provided in the article "Googly Bowlers and Captains Retire" in the 1958 Wisden. After retiring as a player, he became coach at Charterhouse School until 1971.

Wright died in Canterbury, Kent in November 1998, at the age of 84.

== Bibliography ==
- Bateman, Colin (1993). If The Cap Fits. Tony Williams Publications. ISBN 978-18-69833-21-3.

Sporting positions
Preceded by William Murray-Wood	Kent County Cricket Club captain 1954–1956	Succeeded by Colin Cowdrey
