= Stanley Christopherson =

English cricketer and administrator

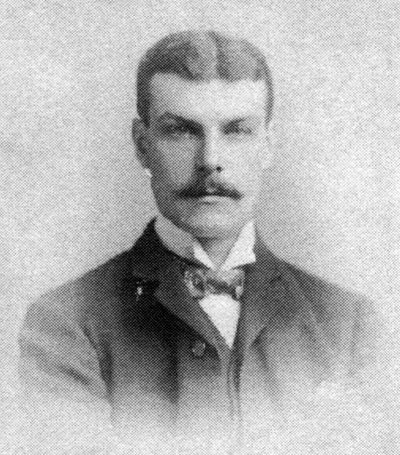
- Stanley Christopherson in 1886

Personal information
- Born: 11 November 1861; Kidbrooke, Blackheath, Kent
- Died: 6 April 1949 (aged 87); St John's Wood, London
- Batting: Right-handed
- Bowling: Right arm fast
- Relatives: Percy Christopherson (brother); Ian Akers-Douglas (grandson)

International information
- National side: England
- Only Test (cap 45): 21 July 1884 v Australia

Domestic team information
- Years: Team
- 1883–1890: Kent

Career statistics
Competition	Test	First-class
Matches	1	66
Runs scored	17	923
Batting average	17.00	9.51
100s/50s	0/0	0/0
Top score	17	47
Balls bowled	136	11,531
Wickets	1	241
Bowling average	69.00	22.12
5 wickets in innings	0	13
10 wickets in match	0	3
Best bowling	1/52	8/41
Catches/stumpings	0/–	41/–
- Source: CricInfo, 16 April 2017

Stanley Christopherson (11 November 1861 – 6 April 1949) was an English amateur cricketer and cricket administrator most notable for having been President of the Marylebone Cricket Club from 1939 to 1946. He played first-class cricket mainly for Kent County Cricket Club and made one Test cricket appearance for England in 1884. He was one of ten brothers who all played cricket in Kent.

== Early life ==
Christopherson was born in Kidbrooke in Blackheath, Kent in 1861. He attended Uppingham School where he was a promising bowler in the Cricket XI.

== Career in cricket ==
His first-class cricket debut was made for Kent in 1883 and he appeared 50 times for the county, mainly between 1883 and 1887. He was considered "one of the best fast bowlers" of the 1880s, performing particularly well in 1884 when he played for the Gentlemen against the Players and for England against the touring Australian Test team and won his county cap. In the same year he played against the Australians for the Gentlemen, taking 8/78, and for Kent, taking 3/12 in 19 overs.

An arm injury in 1886 meant that he played little top-class cricket after 1887, although he made his final Kent appearances in 1890. He and his nine brothers played as a team on Blackheath for several seasons with their father making up the final team member. Only one brother, Percy played first-class cricket, making one appearance alongside Stanley for Kent in 1887. Percy also played rugby union, representing England twice, whilst Stanley played hockey for England. His grandson, Ian Akers-Douglas, captained Kent briefly in the 1930s.

Christopherson was President of the Marylebone Cricket Club between 1939 and 1946, the longest period anyone has held the office. From 1943 to 1945 he was also temporary chairman of the Midland Bank. He died in a nursing home in St John's Wood, London in 1948 aged 87, the last surviving Christopherson brother.

== Bibliography ==
- Carlaw, Derek (2020). Kent County Cricketers, A to Z: Part One (1806–1914) (PDF). Cardiff: ACS.
