= David Clark (cricketer) =

English cricketer and administrator

Personal information
- Full name: David Graham Clark
- Born: 27 January 1919; Barming, Kent
- Died: 8 October 2013 (aged 94)
- Batting: Right-handed
- Bowling: Right arm slow

Domestic team information
- Years: Team
- 1946–1951: Kent

Career statistics
Competition	First-class
Matches	75
Runs scored	1,959
Batting average	15.79
100s/50s	0/10
Top score	78
Balls bowled	52
Wickets	1
Bowling average	44.00
5 wickets in innings	0
10 wickets in match	0
Best bowling	1/19
Catches/stumpings	46/–
- Source: CricInfo, 11 April 2009

David Graham Clark (27 January 1919 – 8 October 2013) was an English cricketer, cricket administrator and British Army officer.

Clark was born in Barming in Kent. He played first-class cricket for five years, appearing for Kent County Cricket Club. He was Kent's captain for the last three years of his career before retiring at the end of the 1951 season. He was President of MCC in 1977–78.

During World War II he served with the British Army, receiving a commission as an officer in the Royal Army Service Corps (RASC) on 16 March 1940. He was then a parachute instructor at Ringway during the formation of the British Army's airborne forces, and was subsequently attached to the 2nd Battalion of the Parachute Regiment, with whom he fought in North Africa, Sicily and Italy. During the attack on Sicily his glider landed in the sea and he swam to shore with three other survivors. He was then posted to HQ 1st Airborne Division and ended up at the bridge in Arnhem during Operation Market Garden with 2 Para, where he was eventually taken prisoner. A modest man, he never mentioned his wartime service.

He is likely to be best remembered for chairing the committee set up by the MCC in 1965 to "examine the future of county cricket in the widest possible terms and if thought fit to recommend alterations in the structure and playing conditions of the County Championship". The first-class counties rejected most of the recommendations made in the so-called "Clark Report", including those for reducing the County Championship to sixteen games and introducing a new one-day league, also of sixteen games. However, before many years had passed changes not dissimilar to these would be introduced. According to Mike Turner, a member of the Clark committee: "We started the ball rolling. The Clark Report was a great stimulus for fresh thinking."

Clark was the tour manager of the 1970-71 English Ashes tour of Australia. The England fast bowler John Snow wrote that the tour "emphasised the gulf between players and administrators" and "I was sick of the biased attitude and incompetence which was apparent in cricket administration". Clark was described by the England captain Ray Illingworth as "an amiable, but somewhat ineffectual man" and there were soon divisions between him and the players.

John Snow had bowled over 50 eight-ball overs in the First Test and was rested for the state match against Western Australia, but Clark insisted that he practice in the nets with the others. Snow bowled a couple of desultory overs and Clark berated him for five minutes after which Snow told him "that as far as my good conduct money was concerned he could swallow it" and went walkabout until the next day. Ray Illingworth smoothed things over, but after the Second Test Clark criticized both captains for cautious play, England for their short-pitched bowling and indicated that he would prefer to see Australia win 3-1 than see four more draws. Ray Illingworth only discovered this when he was asked for a comment by a journalist in the morning and the rest of the team when they read the newspapers at the airport. As a result, Illingworth effectively took over the running of the tour with the support of the players and Clark's influence declined.

Clark's only ally was the vice-captain Colin Cowdrey, also from Kent, who became isolated as a result. In the final Test at Sydney, Clark tried to push Illingworth back onto the field when he took the team off because of the crowd throwing beer cans after the Snow–Jenner incident. A furious Illingworth said he would not return until the playing area had been cleared and the crowd had calmed down and objected to Clark constantly siding with the Australians against his own team. When the team returned to England, Illingworth said that "all hell would break loose" if anyone was denied his good conduct bonus, but this did not happen. However, Geoffrey Boycott and John Snow had to report to Lord's for a dressing down by the MCC Secretary Billy Griffith for their behaviour.

== Notes ==
Sporting positions
Preceded by Bryan Valentine	Kent County Cricket Club captain 1949–1951	Succeeded by William Murray-Wood
