= Bill Murray-Wood =

English cricketer (1917–1968)

Personal information
- Full name: William Murray-Wood
- Born: 30 June 1917; Dartford, Kent
- Died: 21 December 1968 (aged 51); Southwark, London
- Batting: Right-handed
- Bowling: Right arm leg break

Domestic team information
- Years: Team
- 1936–1953: Kent
- 1936–1938: Oxford University

Career statistics
Competition	First-class
Matches	106
Runs scored	2,262
Batting average	13.96
100s/50s	3/3
Top score	107
Balls bowled	6,534
Wickets	100
Bowling average	38.50
5 wickets in innings	2
10 wickets in match	0
Best bowling	6/29
Catches/stumpings	45/–
- Source: Cricinfo, 19 April 2008

William Murray-Wood (30 June 1917 – 21 December 1968) was an English amateur cricketer who played first-class cricket for Oxford University and Kent between 1936 and 1953. He was Kent's captain in 1952 and 1953, leaving in controversial circumstances.

== Life and career ==
Murray-Wood was born at Dartford, Kent. He was educated at Mill Hill School in London, and at Oriel College, Oxford.

Murray-Wood was primarily a batsman, and scored 106 not out on his first-class debut for Oxford in 1936 against Gloucestershire. He also bowled leg-spin, with best figures of 6 for 29 for Oxford against The Army in 1937. He was an excellent fieldsman.

He made his Kent debut in 1936, and played occasionally until he was appointed captain of the team in 1952. He made his highest first-class score in the match against Sussex in 1952, scoring 107 and adding 233 in three hours with Dicky Mayes to save Kent from defeat. His county career came to an abrupt end in 1953, when the Kent committee announced during Canterbury Cricket Week in August that he was being replaced as captain by Doug Wright. At the annual meeting the following February it was made clear that the county's amateur players had told the club they would not continue under Murray-Wood's leadership.

Murray-Wood spent most of his life as a fruit farmer. During World War II he served with the Special Operations Executive, training men and women to parachute into occupied territory and work with patriot forces. He died in Guy's Hospital in London in December 1968, aged 51.

Sporting positions
Preceded by David Clark	Kent County Cricket Club captain 1952–1953	Succeeded by Doug Wright
