= Gerry Chalk =

English cricketer (1910–1943)

Personal information
- Full name: Frederick Gerald Hudson Chalk
- Born: 7 September 1910; Sydenham, London
- Died: 17 February 1943 (aged 32); Louches, Pas-de-Calais, France
- Batting: Right-handed

Domestic team information
- Years: Team
- 1931–1934: Oxford University
- 1933–1939: Kent

Career statistics
Competition	First-class
Matches	156
Runs scored	6,732
Batting average	28.16
100s/50s	11/31
Top score	198
Balls bowled	605
Wickets	7
Bowling average	58.42
5 wickets in innings	0
10 wickets in match	0
Best bowling	2/22
Catches/stumpings	62/–
- Source: CricInfo, 22 March 2009

Frederick Gerald Hudson Chalk DFC, born Gerald Frederick Hudson Chalk and known as Gerry Chalk, (7 September 1910 – 17 February 1943) was an English amateur cricketer. He was a right-handed batsman who played first-class cricket for Oxford University, Kent County Cricket Club and MCC between 1931 and 1939, captaining both Oxford and Kent. Chalk died in 1943, shot down over northern France whilst serving as a Spitfire pilot in the Royal Air Force.

== Early life ==
Chalk was born in Sydenham in Kent in 1910. He was the son of Arthur and Edith Chalk of Cooden Beach in Sussex. He was coached at Uppingham by Punter Humphreys who had been a professional in the Kent teams which won four County Championship titles in the years before World War I. He attended Uppingham School where he played cricket, leading the school in batting average in 1928. He went up to Brasenose College, Oxford in 1930.

== Cricket career ==
Chalk won his cricket Blue in 1931 as a freshman at Oxford, making his first-class cricket debut for the university against Kent in May. He played in 46 first-class matches for the university, captaining the team in 1934. He scored a century in the 1934 University Match, an innings which Wisden described as "brilliant", and made six centuries for the university team.

Having first played for Kent's Second XI in the Minor Counties Championship in 1928, Chalk made his first-class debut of the county in July 1933 against Middlesex at the Bat and Ball Ground in Gravesend. Working as a teacher at Malvern College from 1934 to 1938, he played for the county on a fairly regular basis during the summer holidays each season until 1938 when he was appointed captain of the team. He played throughout the next two seasons, making a total of 101 appearances for the county.

Chalk made 1,000 runs both seasons he was captain of Kent and was described as "skilful" in defence, with the ability to score effectively and field well. He scored five centuries for Kent, with his highest score of 198 being made at Tonbridge against Sussex in 1939. He was considered an "excellent captain in the field" who was effective at managing his bowling attack and who was aggressive in pursuing victories. In 1939 he promoted fast scoring bowler Alan Watt to bat alongside Arthur Fagg in Kent's second innings at Colchester. Fagg scored a double century in both innings of the match, the only time this has been achieved in first-class cricket. He scored a century in the penultimate match of Kent's 1939 season in August against Yorkshire at Dover, carrying his bat through Kent's first innings against Hedley Verity's bowling, and played his final first-class match against Lancashire later the same month.

As well as playing for Oxford and Kent, Chalk played in two Gentlemen v Players matches and played four times for Marylebone Cricket Club (MCC). He appeared for an England XI against the touring Indians in 1936 and for the Gentlemen of England in against Don Bradman's Australian team in 1938. Chalk's extended family of cricket-playing relatives included his uncle Harold Prest who played for Kent either team of World War I. He married Rosemary Foster, the daughter of Geoffrey Foster who had played for both Kent and Worcestershire. His brother-in-law Peter Foster played under Chalk's captaincy at Kent in 1939.

As well as playing cricket, Chalk was a hockey player. He played for Oxford University and the Surrey county team, winning a hockey Blue.

== Military service and death ==
At the outbreak of World War II, Chalk joined the Honourable Artillery Company as a gunner before transferring to the RAF. He won the Distinguished Flying Cross in June 1941 serving as a rear gunner in 218 Squadron during a bombing raid on Hannover. The citation for the award described his "cool and accurate fire" which " undoubtedly saved his aircraft and probably destroyed the attacker".

He took a pilot's course and was promoted to Flight Lieutenant in 1942, commanding a flight of Spitfire fighters in 124 Squadron. His aircraft was shot down over Louches in northern France, probably by a Fw 190 of JG 26, on 17 February 1943. He was one of 4 British pilots shot down that day, with 2 dying, one being fatally wounded, and another evading capture. He was officially listed as Missing in Action and his obituary appeared in Wisden in 1945, having been listed as presumed dead in January 1944. His body was identified in February, 1989, and his remains transferred to the Terlincthun British Cemetery near Wimille in 1989, having originally been listed on the Runnymede Memorial.

Sporting positions
Preceded by Ronnie Bryan and Bryan Valentine	Kent County Cricket Club captain 1938–1939	Succeeded by Bryan Valentine
