= List of Kent County Cricket Club captains =

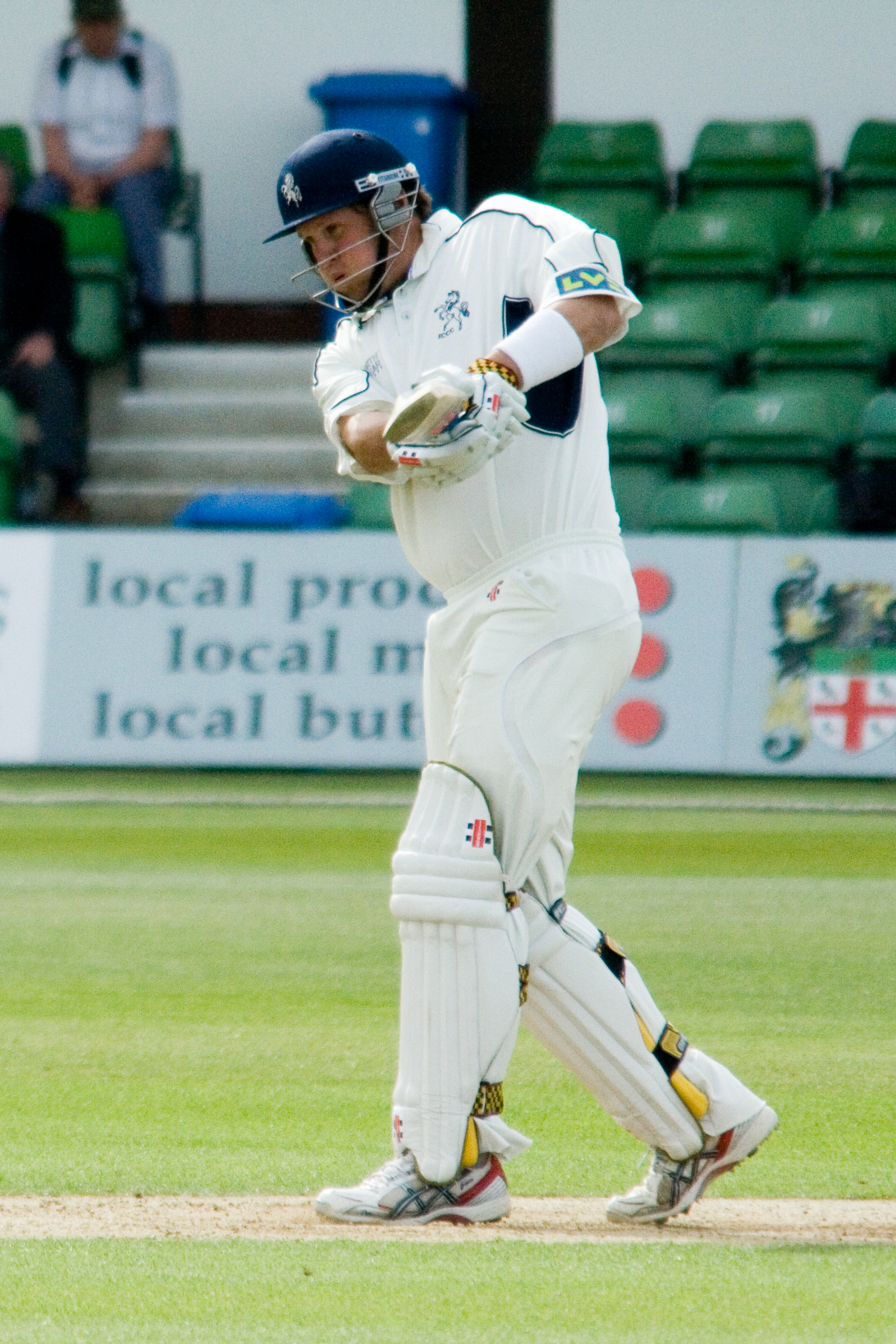
Rob Key was appointed captain in 2006.

This is a list of Kent County Cricket Club captains. Kent County Cricket Club was formed in 1842 and has played in the County Championship since its inception in 1890 and in List A cricket and Twenty20 cricket. The first match in which Kent have a named captain indicated on scorecards available occurred on 26–27 June 1856 when the county played the Marylebone Cricket Club at Gravesend. South Norton captained the team on that occasion and throughout the period until 1870. The first official club captain was Lord Harris, who was appointed to the role in 1875. (Note: A list produced by Kent County Cricket Club in October 2014 has a slightly different set of dates, including Harris as captain from 1871. This contradicts the club history, scorecards and other sources.) As of 2026, the current club captain is batsman Daniel Bell-Drummond, who was appointed in October 2023, replacing Sam Billings.

In total, 34 men have been officially appointed as captain of the club. Colin Cowdrey captained the team a total of 250 times in first-class cricket and held the position for 15 years, the most of any player since the establishment of the County Championship. At times there have been multiple captains during a season and joint captains have been appointed.

Other players have captained the county in matches without being appointed the club captain. Peter Richardson has done so the most times in first-class matches, captaining Kent in 45 matches, including 21 matches in the 1963 season in place of official club captain Colin Cowdrey. In 2015 Sam Northeast captained the team on a number of occasions, including in all one-day matches, despite the club captain being Rob Key. Northeast captained the team after the beginning of the season even when Key was playing and succeeded him at the end of the season.

Kent won their first County Championship title in 1906, under the captaincy of Cloudesley Marsham, and have won the title on a further six occasions, including one shared title in 1977. Ted Dillon won the Championship three times as captain in the period immediately before World War I. Mike Denness captained Kent to six one-day titles in the early 1970s.

== Captains ==
Below is a list of club captains appointed by Kent County Cricket Club or players who have been the sole known captain when no other has been appointed. Captains are listed in order of appointment.

Name	First	Last	Notes
William South Norton	1856	1870	No captain is recorded in a match for Kent before 1856 or between the end of the 1870 season and the start of the 1875 season. Norton played for Kent between 1849 and 1870 and was honorary secretary of the county club formed at Maidstone in 1859 until the merger of the two Kent clubs in 1870.
Lord Harris	1875	1889	Harris went on to be an influential administrator of both Kent and MCC. He was appointed captain in 1875 and held the role for 15 years, having been on the committee at the club since 1870. Resigned the captaincy after the 1889 season to take up an appointment as Governor of Bombay, a post he held until 1895. Played his final match for Kent in 1911 aged 60.
Frank Marchant with William Patterson at times	1890	1897	Marchant was captain for eight seasons between 1890 and 1897. William Patterson, a solicitor, was often unavailable to play in the first half of the season and was "elected captain" in the second part of four seasons. He captained most frequently in the 1891 and 1892 seasons in which he was captain five times in each August.
Jack Mason	1898	1902	Resigned the captaincy after five seasons due to his time commitments as a solicitor. Temporarily captained the team in the last month of the 1909 County Championship winning season when Ted Dillon "stopped playing for business reasons".
Cuthbert Burnup	1903		Made 102 consecutive County Championship appearances for Kent between 1899 and the end of his captaincy in 1903.
C. H. B. Marsham	1904	1908	County Championship winners 1906. Became an England Test selector in 1908.
Ted Dillon	1909	1913	County Championship winners 1909, 1910 and 1913.
Lionel Troughton	1914	1923	Became Kent's General Manager after 1923.
Stanley Cornwallis	1924	1926	A fast bowler who bowled only 560 overs during his three seasons as captain, mainly due to injury.
John Evans	1927		Played his only full season whilst captain.
Geoffrey Legge	1928	1930	Died in 1940 in a flying accident whilst serving in the Fleet Air Arm.
Percy Chapman and Bryan Valentine	1931	1935	Chapman had captained England between 1926 and 1931 before becoming Kent captain. He played less regularly from 1936 onwards and the captaincy was shared at various times, with Valentine generally captaining in his absence, although Chapman retained the official club captaincy until the end of the 1936 season and other players were nominated as "deputy captains" in his place.
Percy Chapman, Ian Akers-Douglas and Bryan Valentine	1936		Akers-Douglass captained the team five times in 1936.
Ronnie Bryan and Bryan Valentine	1937		Bryan was limited to playing for Kent when not working but was granted a three-month leave of absence in 1937 when he shared the captaincy with Valentine.
Gerry Chalk	1938	1939	Killed in action in World War II. Scored over 1,000 runs in both his seasons as captain.
Bryan Valentine	1946	1948	Had previously been joint captain between 1931 and 1937 and had been injured in World War II.
David Clark	1949	1951	Later became an administrator of Kent, MCC and the ICC.
William Murray-Wood	1952	1953	Only an occasional player before being appointed as captain in October 1951, having captained the team in the last five matches of the 1951 season. Replaced, against his will, as captain during Canterbury Cricket Week in August 1953 by Doug Wright.
Doug Wright	1953	1956	First professional captain. Until this point every captain of the county had been an amateur. Wright replaced William Murray-Wood in August 1953 as captain and was appointed formally after amateur Tony Pawson, the Kent Committee's preferred choice, declined the position.
Colin Cowdrey	1957	1971	County Championship winners 1970 and Gillette Cup winners 1967. Longest span as county captain, captaining the county in 250 first-class games over 15 seasons. Captained England 27 times between 1959 and 1969 and was the first man to play 100 Test matches. His son, Chris Cowdrey captained the county between 1985 and 1990 and another son, Graham Cowdrey, and grandson Fabian Cowdrey have both played for the county.
Mike Denness	1972	1976	Had stood in as captain when Colin Cowdrey was on England duty and took over full-time at the start of the 1972 season. Won six one-day trophies as captain before being replaced as captain and leaving the county at the end of the 1976 season. Denness captained England 19 times and later was chairman and president of Kent.
Asif Iqbal	1977		First overseas player to captain Kent. Joint County Championship winners 1977, Asif also captained the Pakistan team.
Alan Ealham	1978	1980	County Championship winners 1978. Ealham was appointed shortly before the start of the 1978 season amid controversy over the role of Asif and other senior players in the establishment of Kerry Packer's World Series Cricket competition.
Asif Iqbal	1981	1982	Previously captain in 1977.
Chris Tavaré	1983	1984	England Test batsman who later captained Somerset.
Chris Cowdrey	1985	1990	Son of Colin Cowdrey, Kent captain from 1957 to 1971. Captained England on one occasion in 1988.
Mark Benson	1991	1996	Benson was injured in 1996 and did not play, retiring in mid-season. He had been appointed captain at the start of the season although Steve Marsh captain the team throughout the season. Later became an umpire, standing in Test matches.
Steve Marsh	1996	1998	Captained the county to the 1995 National League title when Mark Benson was injured in the latter half of the season. Took over as club captain at the end of the 1996 season following Benson's retirement.
Matthew Fleming	1999	2002	Replaced Marsh at the end of the 1998 season, having previously captained the British Army cricket team. Was the Chairman of the Professional Cricketers Association from 1998 to 2001 and later became the MCC Chairman of Cricket in 2013 and President in 2016.
David Fulton	2003	2005	Matthew Fleming retained the club captaincy in 2002 with Fulton captaining the team in the County Championship before being appointed sole captain in October 2002. Matthew Walker acted as official List A captain for the second half of 2005 after Fulton lost his place in the one-day team. Fulton stepped down after Kent failed to win the 2005 County Championship.
Rob Key	2006	2012	Won the Twenty20 Cup in 2007 and the Second Division County Championship title in 2009. Key resigned the captaincy at the end of the 2012 season.
James Tredwell	2013		Resigned after one season to focus on his role within the England team, having missed several matches during 2013 whilst on England duty.
Rob Key	2014	2015	Previously captain 2006 to 2012. Sam Northeast acted as County Championship captain for much of 2015 and was the one-day captain throughout the year.
Sam Northeast	2016	2017	Appointed in September 2016 after captaining the team on the field for most of the 2016 season. Reappointed for the 2017 season in September 2016 and replaced by the county in January 2018 after declining the offer of a contract extension which would have kept him at Kent beyond the end of the 2018 season. Northeast left Kent to join Hampshire in February 2018, having been given permission to speak to other counties.
Sam Billings	2018	2023 (Note: Billings retains the role in Twenty20 cricket.)	Appointed in January 2018. Led the club to promotion to Division One of the County Championship in September 2018 alongside a One Day Cup final appearance the same year, and captained the team to the 2021 T20 Blast title. (Note: Kent also won the 2022 One-Day Cup competition whilst Billings was club captain, although he did not play in the campaign.) A variety of players captained the team when Billings was playing in Twenty20 leagues or for England teams. Following a run of disappointing performances at the start of the 2023 season, Billings decided to step down as captain for County Championship matches, but retained the role in other formats. Jack Leaning captained the team in the remaining Championship matches, and at the end of the season Billings resigned the club captaincy.
Daniel Bell-Drummond	2024		Appointed in October 2023 as club captain. (Note: Bell-Drummond was appointed as the club captain, although his predecessor Sam Billings will retain the role of captain in Twenty20 cricket, the first time a dedicated Twenty20 captain has been appointed by Kent.) Bell-Drummond had previously captained the county team in 42 matches over the previous four seasons.

== See also ==
- List of Kent County Cricket Club players
