= Carol Valentine =

English cricketer

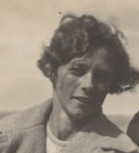

Personal information
- Full name: Carol Mary Valentine
- Born: 26 November 1906; Blackheath, Kent, England
- Died: January 1992 (aged 85); Kendal, Cumbria, England
- Batting: Right-handed
- Bowling: Right arm medium
- Role: Bowler
- Relatives: BH Valentine (Brother)

International information
- National side: England
- Only Test (cap 11): 28 December 1934 v Australia

Career statistics
Competition	WTest	WFC
Matches	1	3
Runs scored	0	7
Batting average	0.00	3.50
100s/50s	0/0	0/0
Top score	0	7*
Balls bowled	30	83
Wickets	1	1
Bowling average	9.00	22.00
5 wickets in innings	0	0
10 wickets in match	0	0
Best bowling	1/9	1/9
Catches/stumpings	0/–	1/–
- Source: CricketArchive, 11 March 2021

Carol Mary Valentine (26 November 1906 – January 1992) is an English former cricketer who played as a right-arm medium bowler. She appeared in one Test match, the first in history, for England in 1934 against Australia. She played domestic cricket for local and regional teams, including teams representing the South of England and the Midlands. Valentine also played lacrosse. Her brother, Bryan also played test cricket for England.

== Early life ==
Valentine was born in 1906, in Blackheath, England. Her brother, Bryan, played for England between 1933 and 1939 and was captain of Kent. With a small build, she was good at lacrosse.

== Domestic career ==
At the domestic level, Valentine played for various local, regional and composite XIs. She played three matches between 1930 and 1933 for the Women's Cricket Association. In the first match against Michael Singleton's XI, Valentine was the best bowler for her side, picking up 4 wickets for 20 runs. In the second match against J Singleton's XI, she scored 4 runs and remained not out when the team declared their innings. Valentine was not given the chance to bowl and the match ended in a draw. She played her last match for the Women's Cricket Association a year later, conceding 20 runs without taking any wickets.

== International career ==
Valentine represented England in the first women's Test match that was played against Australia in December 1934, but did not make any appearances in international cricket thereafter. Batting at number 11 she was bowled by Anne Palmer, the Australian off-spinner, for a duck in England's first innings. Valentine did not bowl in the first innings. However, she was given an opportunity to bowl in the second innings. Valentine bowled just five overs while claiming her first international wicket when she bowled out Kath Smith. England went on to win the match by nine wickets.
