= Alan Ealham =

English cricketer (born 1944)

Personal information
- Full name: Alan George Ernest Ealham
- Born: 8 August 1944 (age 82); Willesborough, Kent
- Batting: Right-handed
- Bowling: Right-arm off-break
- Role: Middle-order batsman
- Relatives: Mark Ealham (son)

Domestic team information
- Years: Team
- 1966–1982: Kent

Career statistics
Competition	First-class	List A
Matches	305	237
Runs scored	10,996	4,070
Batting average	27.62	23.52
100s/50s	7/59	0/14
Top score	153	94*
Balls bowled	229	12
Wickets	3	1
Bowling average	63.00	9.00
5 wickets in innings	0	0
10 wickets in match	0	0
Best bowling	1/1	1/8
Catches/stumpings	175/–	102/–
- Source: Cricinfo, 9 December 2008

Alan George Ernest Ealham (born 8 August 1944) is a former English professional cricketer who played for Kent County Cricket Club. He was born at Willesborough in Kent in 1944.

Ealham made his first-class cricket debut in 1966 after serving an apprenticeship as a welder. He won his county cap in 1970 and captained the club between 1978 and 1980. As captain he led the county to victory in the County Championship and the Benson and Hedges Cup in 1978. He was an outstanding fielder and was 12th man for the England cricket team on a number of occasions, taking two catches in the Ashes Test match against Australia at Lord's at the start of the 1977 series. After playing he retained his links with Kent and was Second XI coach for a number of years.

He is the father of Mark Ealham who also played cricket for Kent and England, and who was also a County Championship winner (with Nottinghamshire).

Sporting positions
Preceded by Asif Iqbal	Kent County Cricket Club captain 1978–1980	Succeeded by Asif Iqbal
