= Asif Iqbal (Pakistani cricketer) =

Pakistani cricketer (born 1943)

Personal information
- Full name: Asif Iqbal Razvi
- Born: 6 June 1943 (age 83); Hyderabad, Hyderabad State, British India
- Height: 1.75 m (5 ft 9 in)
- Batting: Right-handed
- Bowling: Right-arm medium
- Role: All-rounder
- Relatives: Shammi Iqbal (son)

International information
- National side: Pakistan (1964–1980)
- Test debut (cap 42): 24 October 1964 v Australia
- Last Test: 29 January 1980 v India
- ODI debut (cap 1): 11 February 1973 v New Zealand
- Last ODI: 20 June 1979 v West Indies

Domestic team information
- Years: Team
- 1959–1961: Hyderabad
- 1961–1969: Karachi
- 1964–1980: Pakistan International Airlines
- 1968–1982: Kent
- 1976–1977: National Bank of Pakistan

Career statistics
Competition	Test	ODI	FC	LA
Matches	58	10	440	259
Runs scored	3,575	330	23,329	5,989
Batting average	38.85	55.00	37.26	27.98
100s/50s	11/12	0/5	45/118	3/33
Top score	175	62	196	106
Balls bowled	3,864	592	18,899	5,017
Wickets	53	16	291	126
Bowling average	28.33	23.62	30.30	25.96
5 wickets in innings	2	0	5	1
10 wickets in match	0	0	0	0
Best bowling	5/48	4/56	6/45	5/42
Catches/stumpings	36/–	7/–	301/–	101/–
- Source: ESPNcricinfo, 8 March 2013

Asif Iqbal Razvi (Urdu: آصف اقبال رضوی, born 6 June 1943) is a Pakistani former professional cricketer who captained the Pakistan national cricket team and Kent County Cricket Club. He went on to become a match referee.

Born in Hyderabad, Asif Iqbal is related to former India captain Ghulam Ahmed and Indian tennis star Sania Mirza. He played as an all-rounder who batted right-handed and bowled right-arm medium pace deliveries.

Asif played domestically for Hyderabad, Karachi, Kent, National Bank of Pakistan and Pakistan International Airlines. After learning his cricket in Hyderabad, India, he emigrated to Pakistan in 1961, where he opened the bowling with swing bowling before concentrating on his batting that was noted for its footwork and cavalier cover-driving. In 1977, he played in World Series Cricket competition for the World XI team.

On his Test match debut, against Australia in Karachi in the 1964–1965 series, Asif batted at number 10. After developing back problems, Asif began to focus on his batting and gradually worked his way up Pakistan's batting order.

In the series against England in 1967, Asif scored his maiden Test century, making 146 runs batting at number 9 at The Oval, sharing in a then Test record partnership for the ninth wicket with Intikhab Alam. This was also the then highest score by a number 9 batsman in Test matches in England (until exceeded by Stuart Broad in 2010). According to Wisden, when he reached his hundred: "An amazing scene followed. Hundreds of Pakistanis raced to the wicket and hoisted Asif shoulder high. The game was held up for five minutes and when a squad of police rescued him, the poor fellow was bruised and battered". In 1968 he was named one of the Wisden Cricketers of the Year and captained Pakistan at the 1975 and 1979 Cricket World Cups, leading the team to the semi-finals in 1979. At Test level, he captained Pakistan team in a six Test series against India in 1979/80 before retiring from Test cricket after 58 matches.

With Kent he was part of a successful team which won both the County Championship and the Benson and Hedges Cup in 1978, and the Benson and Hedges Cup in 1973 and 1976, Asif winning the man of the match award for an all-round performance in the 1973 final. He was also man of the match, although appearing on the losing team, in the Gillette Cup final of 1971.

== Personal life ==
Iqbal is married and lives in Kent. He has two sons, one of whom is a cricketer and businessman.

Sporting positions
Preceded by Intikhab Alam; Majid Khan; Wasim Bari	Pakistani national cricket captain 1975; 1975–1976; 1978–1979	Succeeded by Majid Khan; Mushtaq Mohammad; Javed Miandad
Preceded by Mike Denness; Alan Ealham	Kent County Cricket Club captain 1977; 1981–1982	Succeeded by Alan Ealham; Chris Tavaré
