= Mark Ealham =

English cricketer

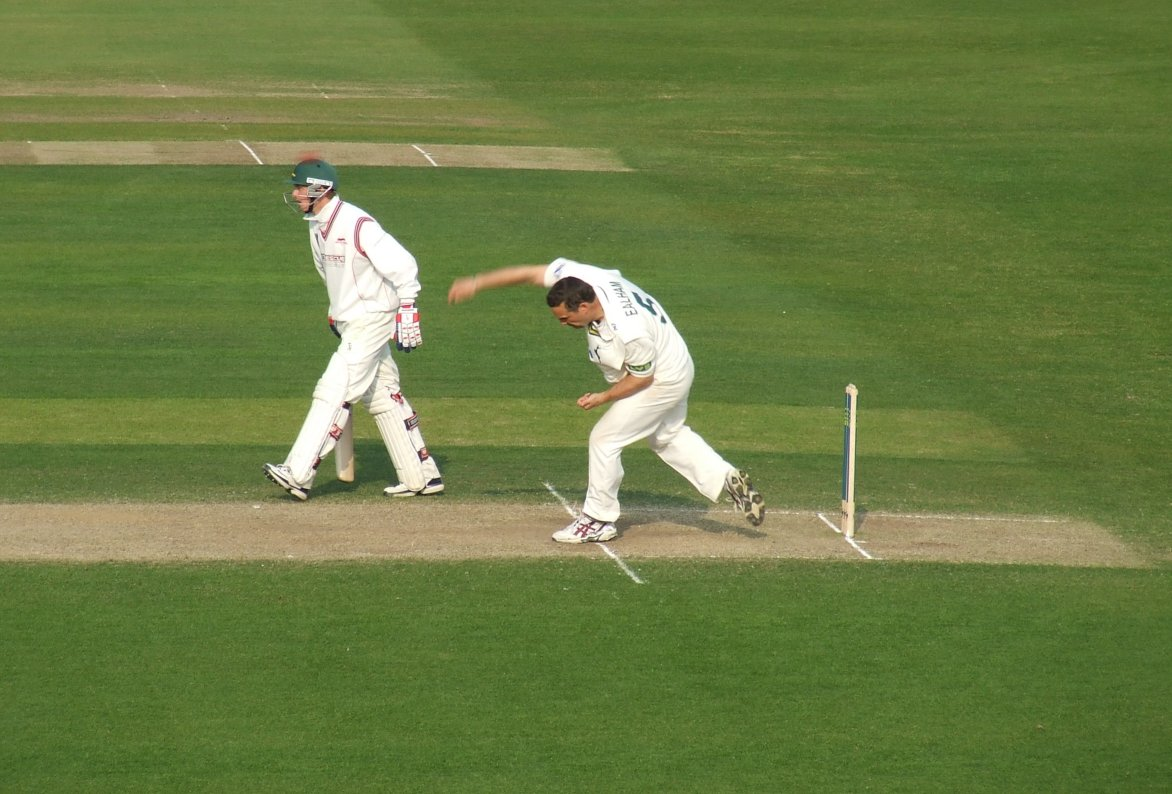

Personal information
- Full name: Mark Alan Ealham
- Born: 27 August 1969 (age 57); Willesborough, Kent
- Nickname: Ealy, Border, Skater
- Height: 5 ft 10 in (1.78 m)
- Batting: Right-handed
- Bowling: Right arm medium-fast
- Role: All-rounder
- Relatives: Alan Ealham (father); Simon Willis (brother-in-law)

International information
- National side: England
- Test debut (cap 580): 4 July 1996 v India
- Last Test: 21 June 1998 v South Africa
- ODI debut (cap 136): 23 May 1996 v India
- Last ODI: 12 June 2001 v Pakistan

Domestic team information
- Years: Team
- 1989–2003: Kent
- 2004–2009: Nottinghamshire

Career statistics
Competition	Test	ODI	FC	LA
Matches	8	64	281	417
Runs scored	210	716	11,349	6,326
Batting average	21.00	17.46	31.96	23.96
100s/50s	0/2	0/0	13/67	1/26
Top score	53*	45	153*	112
Balls bowled	1,060	3,227	38,434	18,500
Wickets	17	67	643	477
Bowling average	28.70	32.79	27.93	26.50
5 wickets in innings	0	2	24	4
10 wickets in match	0	0	2	0
Best bowling	4/21	5/15	8/36	6/53
Catches/stumpings	4/–	9/–	158/–	110/–
- Source: CricInfo, 14 October 2009

Mark Alan Ealham (born 27 August 1969) is a former English cricketer, who played Test and One Day International cricket. He played domestic cricket for Kent County Cricket Club and Nottinghamshire County Cricket Club as an all-rounder.

He retired in September 2009, after 20 seasons in domestic cricket, to take charge of cricket at The King's School, Canterbury. During his time at King's, he coached several Kent academy players including Ollie Robinson.

== Domestic career ==
Ealham was born in Willesborough in Kent and began his career with Kent County Cricket Club. His father, Alan Ealham, had spent his entire career with Kent. He made his first-class and list A cricket debuts for Kent in 1989.

Despite his promising Test debut, Ealham was always regarded as a limited-overs specialist. This belief is mainly due to his free-swinging batting style – during a Twenty20 Cup match in 2005 against Durham he scored 45 off 17 balls including 34 runs in a single over.

Ealham left Kent before the 2003 season and signed a three-year contract with Nottinghamshire, with whom he won the 2005 County Championship. Ealham took 56 wickets in 15 Championship matches that season, the most by a Nottinghamshire bowler and the fifth-most in Division One – at an average of 20.80, the fourth-lowest in Division One among bowlers with more than 20 wickets.

== International career ==
Ealham was first called into the England team for the start of India's tour of England in 1996. His one-day debut came on 23 May in the first one-day international. Although no result was possible due to rain, Ealham impressed as he reached 40 runs. He made his Test debut in the third Test in July. Ealham once again impressed, he scored 51 runs in the first innings and took second-innings bowling figures of 4/21, which he never surpassed at Test level.

His greatest performance as a player, however, came in January 2000 when England played Zimbabwe in the fifth match of a triangular tournament held in South Africa. Ealham took five wickets for only 15 runs. At the time this was the best bowling performance by an Englishman in a one-day international match ever. Even more remarkable is that all five wickets were LBWs. This is still a record in one-day international cricket.

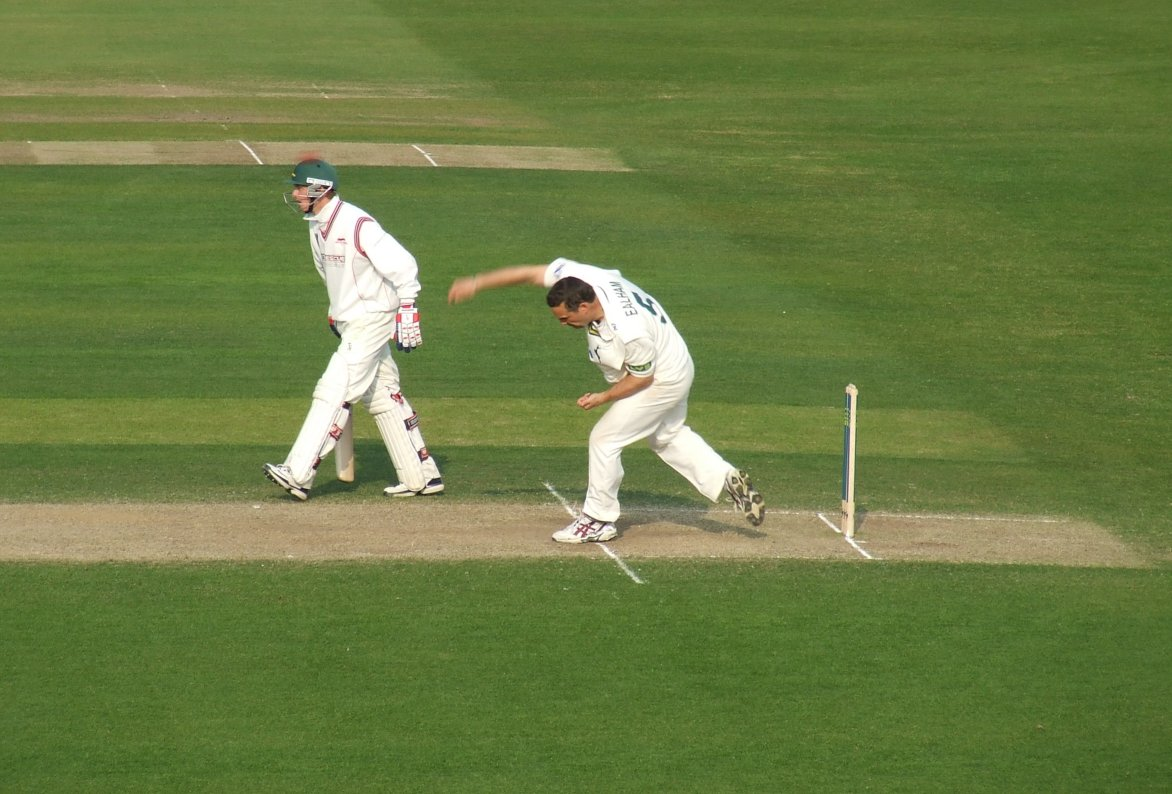
Ealham bowls for Nottinghamshire
