= 1921 English cricket season =

Cricket Championship

1921 was the 28th season of County Championship cricket in England. Australia emphasised a post-war superiority that it owed in particular to the pace duo of Gregory and McDonald. Having won 5–0 in Australia the previous winter, the Australians won the first three Tests of the 1921 tour and then drew the last two to retain the Ashes. It was the 29th test series between the two teams.

The County Championship was won for the second year in succession by Middlesex County Cricket Club. Glamorgan County Cricket Club joined the championship for the first time.

== Honours ==
- County Championship - Middlesex
- Minor Counties Championship - Staffordshire
- Wisden - Hubert Ashton, Jack Bryan, Jack Gregory, Charlie Macartney, Ted McDonald

== Test series ==
Cumulative record - Test wins	1876–1921
England	40
Australia	43
Drawn	21

== Leading batsmen ==
Phil Mead topped the averages with 3179 runs @ 69.10

== Leading bowlers ==
Wilfred Rhodes topped the averages with 141 wickets @ 13.27

== Annual reviews ==
- Wisden Cricketers' Almanack 1922
