= 1978 County Championship =

English cricket tournament

- Dates: 3 May – 8 September 1978
- Administrator: England and Wales Cricket Board
- Cricket format: First-class cricket
- Tournament format: League system
- Champions: Kent (6th title)
- Participants: 17
- Matches: 184
- Most runs: Dennis Amiss, (Warwickshire); 2,001
- Most wickets: Derek Underwood, (Kent); 110

The 1978 Schweppes County Championship was the 79th officially organised running of the County Championship. Kent won the Championship title. The Championship was sponsored by Schweppes for the first time.

== Table ==
- 12 points for a win
- 5 points to each team for a tie
- 5 points to team still batting in a match in which scores finish level
- Bonus points awarded in first 100 overs of first innings
  - Batting: 150 runs - 1 point, 200 runs - 2 points 250 runs - 3 points, 300 runs - 4 points
  - Bowling: 3-4 wickets - 1 point, 5-6 wickets - 2 points 7-8 wickets - 3 points, 9-10 wickets - 4 points
- No bonus points awarded in a match starting with less than 8 hours' play remaining.
- The two first innings limited to a total of 200 overs. The team batting first limited to 100 overs. Any overs up to 100 not used by the team batting first could be added to the overs of the team batting second.
- Position determined by points gained. If equal, then decided on most wins.
- Each team plays 22 matches.

	Team	P	W	L	D	Bat	Bowl	Pts
1	Kent	22	13	3	6	56	80	292
2	Essex	22	12	1	9	55	74	273
3	Middlesex	21	11	5	5	48	75	255
4	Yorkshire	22	10	3	9	58	55	233
5	Somerset	22	9	4	9	44	76	228
6	Leicestershire	22	4	5	13	57	68	173
7	Nottinghamshire	22	3	7	12	63	67	166
8	Hampshire	21	4	6	11	53	60	161
9	Sussex	22	4	7	11	39	64	151*
10	Gloucestershire	21	4	8	9	42	55	145
11	Warwickshire	22	4	5	13	39	56	143
12	Lancashire	21	4	8	9	28	59	135
13	Glamorgan	22	3	8	11	43	54	133*
14	Derbyshire	22	3	7	12	33	63	132
15	Worcestershire	22	2	5	15	56	51	131
16	Surrey	22	3	7	12	36	58	130
17	Northamptonshire	20	2	6	12	41	56	121

- Sussex and Glamorgan were both deducted six points after a breach of regulations.
