= Percy Chapman =

English cricketer (1900-1961)

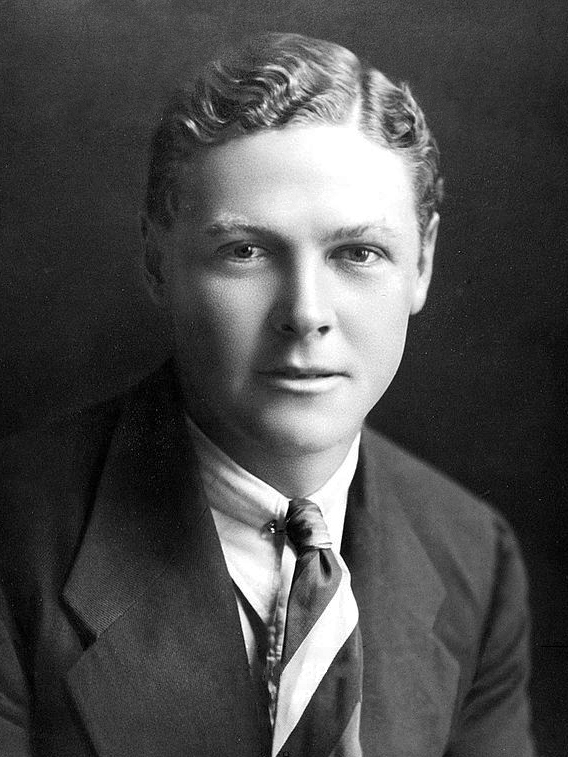
- Chapman in about 1920

Personal information
- Full name: Arthur Percy Frank Chapman
- Born: 3 September 1900; Reading, Berkshire, England
- Died: 16 September 1961 (aged 61); Alton, Hampshire, England
- Batting: Left-handed
- Bowling: Left arm medium Slow left arm orthodox

International information
- National side: England
- Test debut (cap 213): 14 June 1924 v South Africa
- Last Test: 25 February 1931 v South Africa

Domestic team information
- Years: Team
- 1920–1922: Cambridge University
- 1920–1924: Berkshire
- 1924–1938: Kent

Career statistics
Competition	Test	First-class
Matches	26	394
Runs scored	925	16,309
Batting average	28.90	31.97
100s/50s	1/5	27/75
Top score	121	260
Balls bowled	40	1,576
Wickets	0	22
Bowling average	–	41.86
5 wickets in innings	–	1
10 wickets in match	–	0
Best bowling	–	5/40
Catches/stumpings	32/–	356/–
- Source: Cricinfo, 18 July 2009

Arthur Percy Frank Chapman (Note: Chapman was originally known as Arthur. When he went to Cambridge University, he became known as Percy.) (3 September 1900 – 16 September 1961) was an English cricketer who captained the England cricket team between 1926 and 1931. A left-handed batsman, he played 26 Test matches for England, captaining the side in 17 of those games. Chapman was appointed captain for the final, decisive Test of the 1926 series against Australia; under his captaincy, England defeated Australia to win the Ashes for the first time since 1912. An amateur cricketer, Chapman played Minor Counties cricket for Berkshire and first-class cricket for Cambridge University and Kent. Never a reliable batsman, Chapman nevertheless had a respectable batting record. He could score runs very quickly and was popular with spectators. As a fielder, contemporaries rated him extremely highly. Although opinions were divided on his tactical ability as a captain, most critics accepted he was an inspirational leader.

Born in Reading, Berkshire and educated at Uppingham School, Chapman established a reputation as a talented school cricketer and was named one of Wisden's schoolboy Cricketers of the Year in 1919. He went to Pembroke College, Cambridge and represented the University cricket team with great success; his fame reached a peak when he scored centuries against Oxford University and in the Gentlemen v Players match within the space of a week. Chapman made his Test debut in 1924, although he had yet to play County Cricket. Having qualified for Kent, he was the surprise choice to take over from Arthur Carr as England captain in 1926. He achieved victory in his first nine matches in charge but lost two and drew six of his remaining games. Perceived tactical deficiencies and possibly growing concerns over his heavy drinking meant that Chapman was dropped from the team for the fifth Test against Australia in 1930. He captained England on one final tour in 1930–31, after which he never played another Test. After he assumed the Kent captaincy in 1931, his career and physique declined until he resigned from the position in 1936; he retired altogether in 1939, by which time he was drinking heavily.

Chapman's fame as a cricketer made him a popular public figure; he and his wife, whom he married in 1925, were well-known figures in fashionable society and their appearances were followed closely in the press. Outside of cricket, he worked for a brewery. In his later years, Chapman increasingly suffered from the effects of alcoholism and was often seen drunk in public. He and his wife divorced in 1942; he spent his final years, mainly alone, suffering from depression, arthritis and a continued dependence on alcohol. Following a fall at his home and a subsequent operation, Chapman died in 1961, aged 61.

== Early life ==
Chapman was born on 3 September 1900 in Reading, Berkshire, the son of Frank Chapman, a schoolteacher, and his wife Bertha Finch. Chapman's father encouraged him to play cricket and coached him personally. Chapman was first educated at his father's preparatory school, Fritham House, and by the age of eight was in the school's first eleven. In September 1910, he joined Oakham School and scored his first century, dominating the cricket and football teams. From 1914 to 1918, he attended Uppingham School. Although his academic performance was undistinguished, he soon established a cricketing reputation. By 1916, he was in the Uppingham first team; he achieved second place in the school's batting averages, bringing him to the attention of the wider public. Chapman improved his record in 1917, scoring 668 runs at an average of 111.33; he hit two fifties, two centuries and a double century in his last five innings.

In 1918, Chapman scored 472 runs at 52.44 and took 15 wickets; the following year, he captained the team, scored 637 runs at an average of 70.77 and took 40 wickets. As a consequence of his achievements, he was chosen as one of the Cricketers of the Year for 1919 in Wisden Cricketers' Almanack. (Note: The Cricketers of the Year were usually chosen from among first-class cricketers. In the absence of first-class cricket during the First World War, schoolboy cricketers were chosen in 1918 and 1919 based on their performances in the previous season.) In both 1918 and 1919 he was selected for prestigious school representative matches at Lord's Cricket Ground; although his weak defensive play drew comment, he was regarded as one of the most promising cricketers of his generation when he left Uppingham in 1919.

== University cricket ==
In 1919, Chapman entered Pembroke College, Cambridge. He failed in two trial games, organised prior to the 1920 cricket season to inform the selection of the Cambridge team, and despite his reputation, was omitted from the University's opening first-class match against Essex. But on the day of the match, a player withdrew from the Cambridge team and Chapman replaced him. Making his first-class debut on 15 May 1920, he scored 118 in a rapid innings and kept his place in the team for the remainder of the season. After a century and two fifties, he was selected for the University Match against Oxford. Chapman scored 27 in this final game of the university season to aggregate 613 runs at an average of 40.86, second in the Cambridge batting averages. Unusually for someone in their first year of University cricket, he was subsequently selected for the prestigious Gentlemen v Players match at Lord's. Although not particularly successful with the bat, critics singled him out for his effective fielding. During August, he played second-class Minor Counties cricket for Berkshire as an amateur and headed the team's batting averages; he later appeared in three end-of-season first-class games at the Scarborough Festival where he scored 101 in a Gentlemen and Players game against a bowling attack containing three internationals. In all first-class matches in 1920, Chapman scored 873 runs at 39.68.

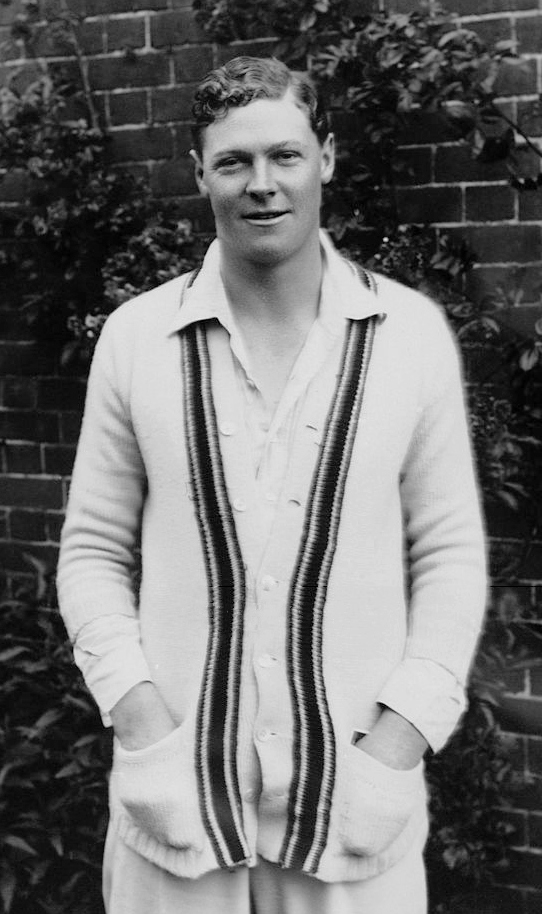
Chapman in about 1922

In 1921, Chapman averaged over 50 for the University and scored three centuries, although his growing reputation meant some critics felt he had underachieved. He once again played in the University match against Oxford and for the Gentlemen against the Players, and impressed commentators. Some critics suggested he, along with other promising University players, should play for England; the Test side was in the middle of a series against Australia which was lost 3–0, in the course of which an unusually large number of players were selected. Chapman once more appeared for Berkshire in August, scoring 468 runs and taking 19 wickets. At the end of the season, he was selected by Archie MacLaren in a match at Eastbourne, playing for an all-amateur non-representative England team against the undefeated Australian touring team. In a match that became famous in later years, MacLaren's team became the first to defeat the tourists, although Chapman was not successful personally. Chapman finished the season with 954 runs at 39.75.

That winter, The Cricketer magazine named Chapman as a young cricketer of the year. However, at the beginning of the 1922 season, his form was so poor that critics suggested leaving him out of the University Match. He had scored 300 runs from 14 innings, but retained his place partially on the strength of his fielding. After Cambridge batted very slowly on the first day, Chapman attacked the bowling on the second morning to score 102 not out. Cambridge won easily, concluding Chapman's cricket at the university, but his innings impressed critics to the extent that he was again selected for the Gentlemen v Players match at Lord's. There, he scored 160 and shared century partnerships with Arthur Carr and Frank Mann. Chapman earned praise for his aggression and his stroke plays on the off side. The Times described it as "one of the great innings in the history of the game". Shortly after this, Sydney Pardon wrote in The Times: "In the cricket field the most interesting figure at the moment is, beyond all comparison, Mr. A. P. F. Chapman. A fortnight ago we were all lamenting his ill success this season and wondering whether he would ever do justice to his great gifts and fulfill the hopes entertained of him in 1920. Most effectually he has put his critics to shame ... he is in such a position that if an England eleven had to meet Australia next week he would be picked at once with acclamation." Prior to this, only R. E. Foster had scored centuries in both the University Match and the Gentlemen v Players match in the same year. Chapman ended his season by scoring 805 runs and taking 19 wickets for Berkshire, and playing in festival games. He aggregated 607 runs at 33.72 in first-class matches for the season.

Chapman was popular at Cambridge and enjoyed his time there. He took part in a variety of social engagements and became involved in other sports. These included fives, tennis, rugby union, golf and football. He captained Pembroke College at rugby and was close to playing for the full university side. Chapman continued to play rugby for Berkshire Wanderers until he was nearly 30 years old. Also for Pembroke, he played as goalkeeper in the football team and might have played for the university at hockey had he taken the sport seriously. In later years, he also displayed proficiency at tennis, in which critics thought he could have reached a high standard if motivated to do so, and golf.

== Cricket career in the mid-1920s ==
=== MCC tour to Australia and New Zealand ===
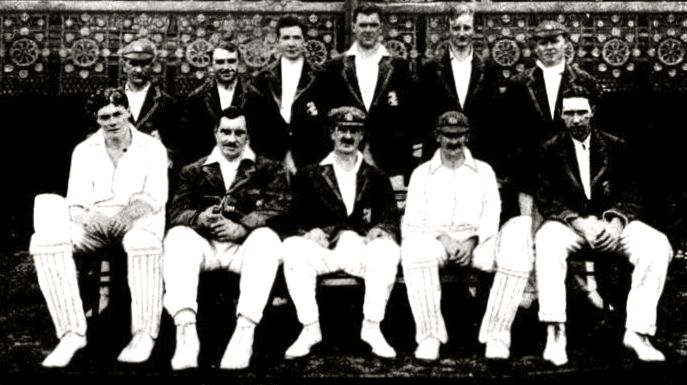
The MCC team that toured Australian in 1922–23: Chapman is sitting on the front row on the extreme left.

During the English winter of 1922–23, the Marylebone Cricket Club (MCC) selected a team to tour Australia and New Zealand. (Note: Throughout Chapman's career, the MCC organised and administered English cricket. Official English touring teams always played under the name of MCC and were only styled "England" during Test matches.) This side, captained by Archie MacLaren and composed mainly of amateurs, was not particularly strong and contained several players chosen for their social standing rather than cricketing ability. The team played four first-class games in Australia against state teams; the first was drawn and the others were lost. After scores of 75 and 58 against Western Australia, Chapman played consecutive innings of 53, 73 and 69 against South Australia and Victoria, followed by 100 in the most eagerly awaited match of the tour against a strong New South Wales side. The press and public praised his attacking batting and his fielding, although Frank Iredale, a former Test cricketer, noticed some flaws in his technique. When the team moved on to New Zealand, after an uncertain start Chapman scored 533 runs at an average of 48.45, including two centuries. The tourists returned to Australia for the last leg of the tour; Chapman scored 91 against New South Wales and 134 in 142 minutes against South Australia. In all the Australian games, he totaled 782 runs at 65.16; in all the matches on tour, he had 1,315 runs at an average of 57.15.

=== Qualifying for Kent ===
When Chapman returned to England, he began to work for a brewery based in Reading, H & G Simonds Ltd; his residence, however, was in Kent and that allowed him to qualify for Kent County Cricket Club. (Note: At the time, the County Championship had strict qualification rules preventing a player appearing for a team in the Championship until he had lived for two years in that county.) There were few opportunities for Chapman to appear in first-class cricket until he qualified. His cricket was mainly restricted to club level in 1923, with some further games for Berkshire. In addition, he played 12 first-class games for a variety of teams; he was selected for the Gentlemen v Players matches at Lord's and The Oval, scoring 83 in the latter game, and played in two trial matches for players on the verge of England selection, although no Tests were played that year. In total, he scored 615 first-class runs at 29.28.

The focus of attention during the 1924 season was selection of a team to contest the Ashes during a Test-playing tour of Australia the following winter. Critics regarded Chapman as a certainty for the team. Continuing to play as an amateur, he made his first appearance for Kent in a non-Championship match, as he was still qualifying, and was very successful in early season club matches. That summer, England played South Africa in a Test series and Chapman was selected for a trial game before the first Test. He scored 64 not out and 43 for "The Rest", (Note: "The Rest" was a team representing the "Rest of England" against the full England side. In this match, "The Rest" was intended to be the England second team, placing Chapman just outside the first choice eleven.) and following the withdrawal of a batsman owing to injury before the first Test, Chapman made his Test debut against South Africa on 14 June. He became one of the few cricketers to represent England while playing for a minor county rather than a team playing in the County Championship. Chapman batted once and scored eight runs; he drew praise from Wisden for an "amazing" catch on the last day as South Africa were heavily beaten. He retained his place for the second Test but did not bat: only four English batsmen were needed in the game which the home side won by an innings. Although selected for the third game, Chapman did not play owing to a motorbike accident. He was not seriously hurt but missed the remainder of the Test series and the Gentlemen v Players game at Lord's. Upon recovering, he returned to play for Berkshire without much success and played several festival games at the end of the season. By this stage, he had already been selected to tour Australia. In the final match of the season, he was selected for "The Rest" to play the County Champions, Yorkshire. He scored 74 in 50 minutes and hit three sixes, two of them from consecutive deliveries from Wilfred Rhodes. This was his highest score of the season, in which he made 561 first-class runs at 31.16.

=== Second tour to Australia ===
The MCC team to Australia was led by Arthur Gilligan. In the opening matches, Chapman was cheered by the crowds who remembered his achievements on the last tour, but failed to make any significant scores. His first big innings came against Victoria; he made 72 runs out of 111 scored while he was batting and played a large part in a win for the MCC. Against Queensland in the following match, he scored 80 in 70 minutes and then hit 93 against a representative Australian XI. He was selected for the first four Tests of the five-match series. Batting aggressively, he made several substantial scores but only once passed fifty— in the third Test, he scored 58, his first Test half century. During the same Test, Gilligan strained a muscle while bowling and had to leave the field; Chapman took over as captain. England lost the first three matches, giving Australia an insurmountable lead in the series, but won the fourth. Chapman was left out of the side for the final Test. In the series, he scored 185 runs at an average of 30.83, and critics were divided as to his ability and effectiveness. The former Australian captain Monty Noble believed Chapman could be a good batsman if he curbed his aggression but The Cricketer considered his technique to be faulty. Wisden did not judge Chapman a complete failure and noted that he "made useful scores at times". In all first-class games, Chapman scored 625 runs at 34.72. Although Chapman had a mixed time on the cricket field, the tour was a success for him socially.

Now qualified to play county cricket for Kent, Chapman played only four times in the County Championship in 1925, preferring to establish himself in his new career in the brewery trade. Not sufficiently wealthy to play cricket full-time as an amateur, Chapman's business commitments frequently restricted his appearances on the cricket field. During his limited first-class appearances in 1925, he scored 207 runs at 25.87 and Wisden said that he "did nothing out of the common".

== England captain ==
=== Ashes series of 1926 ===
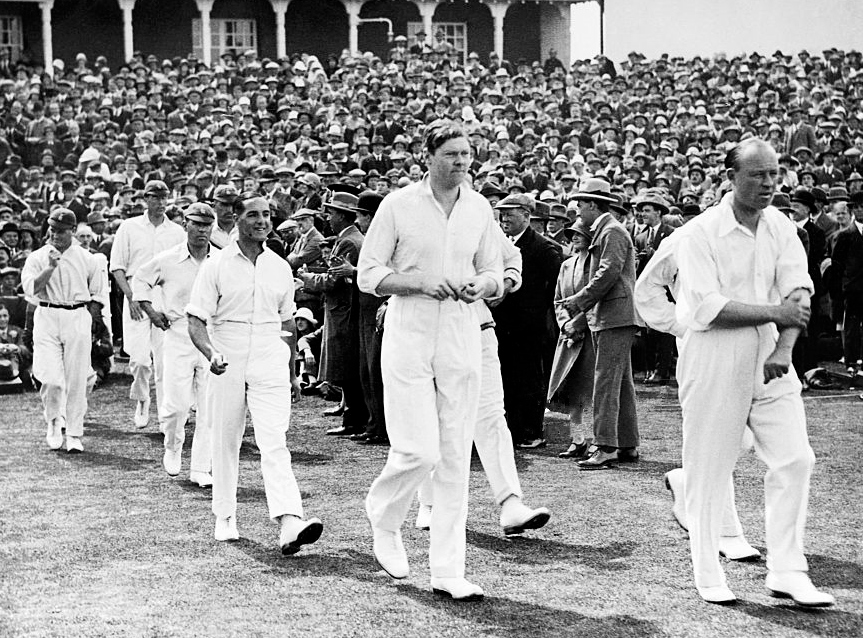
Carr (right) and Chapman leading the England team to the third Test against Australia at Headingley in 1926.

By the beginning of the 1926 season, Chapman was no longer the star of English cricket. Although still respected for his earlier achievements, he had a modest record in Test and first-class cricket. During the season, the Australians toured England for another Ashes series. Chapman did not play any early season games and his first match for Kent was against the touring side. He scored 51, his first first-class fifty since January 1925. A week later, he scored 159 in the County Championship, bringing him back into contention for an England place, then scored 89 in a Test trial match played against the Australians. Chapman's appearances for Kent were sporadic for the rest of the season, but he scored 629 runs in his nine County Championship games at an average of 57.18 to lead the Kent averages. He also scored a century for the Gentlemen against the Players at Lord's.

Early in the season, Arthur Carr was named as England captain for the start of the series; Carr was a popular choice and the only other serious contender at the time was Percy Fender. Chapman played in two of the three trial matches and was chosen for the first Test but did not bat in a match ruined by rain. The second Test was drawn but Chapman scored fifty. Australia dominated most of the third Test but England saved the game; Chapman scored 15 and 42 not out in the match. However, Carr's tactical approach during the match was heavily criticised and he dropped a crucial catch on the first morning. Chapman was omitted from the side for the fourth Test, but fielded as substitute when Carr became ill during the game.

As the first four matches of the series were drawn, the final Test, played at The Oval, was decisive. Aware that England had beaten Australia only once in 19 matches, the selectors made several changes to the team; Chapman, at the time fourth in the national batting averages, replaced Carr as captain. This decision was controversial; the press favoured Carr, particularly as Chapman was young, unproven as captain and not fully established in the team. When the match began on 14 August, Chapman won the toss and decided that England should bat first. When it was his turn to bat, he was given a good reception by the crowd. During his innings, Wisden noted, Chapman "hit out in vigorous fashion", but once he was dismissed for 49, the remaining batsmen were out quickly, leaving England with a disappointing total of 280. Australia replied with 302. On a pitch affected by rain, England then scored 436, mainly because of a large partnership between opening batsmen Jack Hobbs and Herbert Sutcliffe. Australia needed to score 415 to win, which was unlikely given the condition of the pitch. The team were bowled out for 125, and at least one of Chapman's tactical decisions resulted in Australia losing a wicket. Wisden reported that "not a catch was missed nor was a run given away, the whole England side rising gallantly to the occasion. Naturally a scene of tremendous enthusiasm occurred at the end, the crowd swarming in thousands in front of the pavilion, and loudly cheering the players, both English and Australian." The correspondent also commented "Chapman ... despite lack of experience in leading a first-class team in the field, turned out a very happy nomination for the post of captain, the young amateur, for the most part, managing his bowling with excellent judgement, and in two or three things he did, showing distinct imagination." Throughout the match, Chapman chose to follow his own tactics rather than rely on the veteran players in the team for advice. In the series, he scored 175 runs at 58.33.

=== Aftermath and success ===
Following the match, Chapman was lauded as a cricketing hero, and among those who sent congratulatory messages were George V and Prime Minister Stanley Baldwin. In all first-class matches in the season, he scored 1,381 runs at an average of 51.14, the first time he had passed four figures in a season. In his history of the England cricket captaincy, Alan Gibson notes that the controversy over Chapman's appointment was soon forgotten following his success. He writes: "English cricket had a new hero who looked the part ... Every selector was a champion!"

In its summary of the 1927 season, Wisden named him as Kent's best batsman and noted an improvement in his defensive technique. Against Lancashire, who retained the County Championship, he scored 260 in three hours' batting, the highest score of his career. The Lancashire bowling attack included former Australian Test bowler Ted McDonald, regarded as the fastest bowler in the world at the time and feared by most county batsmen. Many critics praised Chapman's innings as one of the best ever played. He was selected to lead the Gentlemen against the Players at Lord's for the first time, and led representative sides in two of the three Test trials held that season; the press judged his captaincy to be good. He totalled 1,387 runs in first-class games at an average of 66.04, the highest aggregate and average of his career. The Kent captaincy became available at the end of the season, but Chapman was not appointed; according to Chapman's biographer, David Lemmon, he was probably approached but was unable to dedicate the necessary time to the position.

Chapman was unavailable for the Test series in South Africa in the winter of 1927–28, but was a certainty to lead the MCC team to Australia in 1928–29. The selectors wished him to play more regularly, so he played more often in 1928 than any other season. He began in good form, but was never as effective as in 1927. Although his captaincy continued to be highly regarded, there were concerns in the press over his increasing weight, although these were offset by his impressive fielding in that season's Tests. He captained England to a 3–0 series win over West Indies, who were playing their first Test matches, and scored one fifty. In total, he scored 967 first-class runs at 37.19.

As expected, Chapman was named as captain for the Australian tour. The MCC touring team was regarded as a strong one by commentators; the only controversy was the omission of Frank Woolley which was not fully explained. Rumours in later years said that Chapman was responsible for leaving Woolley out as he was jealous of his county teammate, but Lemmon regards this as unlikely.

=== Tour of Australia 1928–29 ===
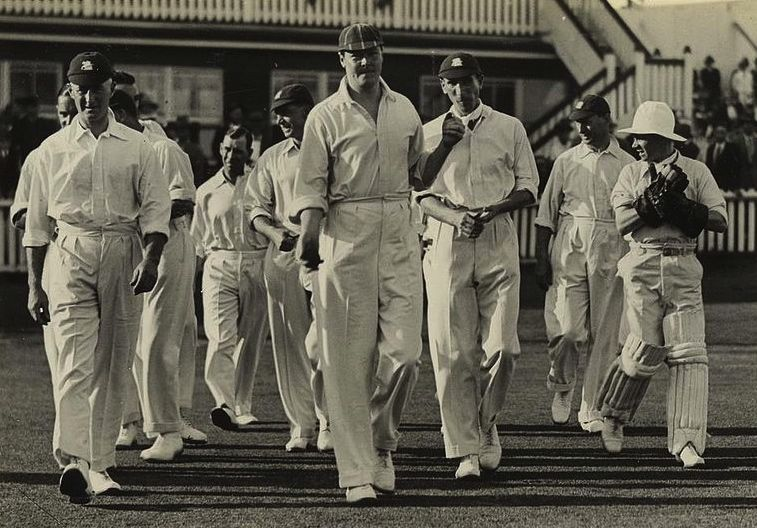
Chapman (centre) leading out the team at Brisbane, 1928

According to Douglas Jardine's biographer, Christopher Douglas, "[Chapman] hardly put a foot wrong during the tour and, even though he gave Australia their biggest hiding to date, he was and probably remains ... one of the most popular English captains to tour Australia." From the opening games, England followed a strategy of accumulating large totals. For the first Test, to strengthen the team's batting, Chapman and the tour selection committee chose only three specialist bowlers; as the Tests were "timeless"—played to a finish with no time limit—he believed batting to be the key to victory. England batted first and scored 521; Chapman scored 50, but critics believed he should have batted more cautiously. When Australia began their innings, he held a catch from Bill Woodfull in the gully which several observers rated as among the best they had seen. Sydney Southerton, writing of the English fielding, said: "The high note was struck by Chapman himself at Brisbane when, with a catch that will be historic, he dismissed Woodfull ... It is my opinion that catch had a pronounced effect on the course of events in the three subsequent Tests ... [Chapman's fielding] exercised a most restraining influence on the Australian batsmen." Australia were bowled out for 122; Chapman did not ask Australia to follow-on but batted again, to the crowd's displeasure, and his batsmen relentlessly built up the England lead. When Chapman became the first captain to declare an innings closed in a timeless Test match, Australia needed 742 to win. On a rain-affected pitch, Australia were bowled out for 66; England's win by 675 runs remains in 2016 the largest margin of victory by runs in Tests.

Chapman's team won the second Test comfortably after scoring 636 in their first innings, the highest team total in Tests at that time. In the third Test, England began the fourth innings requiring 332 to win on a rain-damaged pitch, a task critics believed impossible. A large opening partnership from Hobbs and Sutcliffe gave England a chance, and Hobbs sent a message to the England dressing room suggesting a tactical change in the batting order. But the team could not find Chapman, who according to Percy Fender, in attendance as a journalist, spent most of his time socialising with guests in the Ladies' Stand. Consequently, the team followed Hobbs' plan without the approval of the captain. England's batsmen took the total to within 14 of victory when the fourth wicket fell. Chapman came in and batted in an unusual way; after attempting some big shots, he played ultra-defensively, possibly in an attempt to allow Patsy Hendren to reach fifty runs before England won. Hendren was out soon after, then Chapman tried to hit a six and was caught. The batsmen continued to play recklessly and a further wicket fell to a run out. Douglas describes the end of the match: "Meanwhile, [England batsman George Geary] was quite unruffled by the sudden upsets. He wound up for the next delivery and thumped it through mid-on for 4, bellowing, 'Dammit, we've done 'em!' It was an appropriate way for a side under Chapman to win the Ashes." England's victory in the third Test ensured the Ashes were retained, and the team also won the fourth Test to take a 4–0 lead in the series.

Up to this time, Chapman had enjoyed a harmonious relationship with the Australian crowds. However, in the match against Victoria which followed the fourth Test, the crowd barracked the MCC team when Chapman brought on Harold Larwood, a fast bowler, to bowl against Bert Ironmonger, the number eleven, a tactic regarded as unsporting. (Note: Ironmonger was a notoriously poor batsman; at the time, crowds thought it unfair to target such batsmen with fast bowlers.) As the team returned to the pavilion, Chapman was insulted by members of the crowd in the midst of a minor scuffle. Possibly influenced by these events, he withdrew from the final Test; illness and his poor form may also have been factors. According to Lemmon, it was suggested in later years that Chapman did not play owing to his heavy drinking. In his absence, Australia won the fifth Test. After the fifth day of play and having played both his innings, Jardine left to catch a boat to India, for reasons which are unclear, and Chapman acted as his substitute in the field. Douglas notes that it looked like England "were trying to pull a fast one by picking their strongest batting side (which meant dropping Chapman) without weakening the fielding (since Chapman was Jardine's substitute)." The Australians agreed to the substitution on the condition that Chapman did not field near the batsmen.

In the Tests, Chapman scored 165 runs at 23.57, and in all first-class matches he reached 533 runs and averaged 33.31. Southerton summarised his performance: "Chapman himself began well in batting but in the later matches was too prone to lash out at the off ball and, as the tour progressed, the Australian bowlers discovered his weakness." On his captaincy, Southerton wrote: "Chapman captained the side uncommonly well, improving out of all knowledge as the tour progressed." Socially, Chapman enjoyed the tour; he attended many functions and events; Bill Ferguson, the team scorer, only saw him annoyed once on the tour: when his accustomed drink was not waiting for him at a lunch interval.

=== Ashes series of 1930 ===
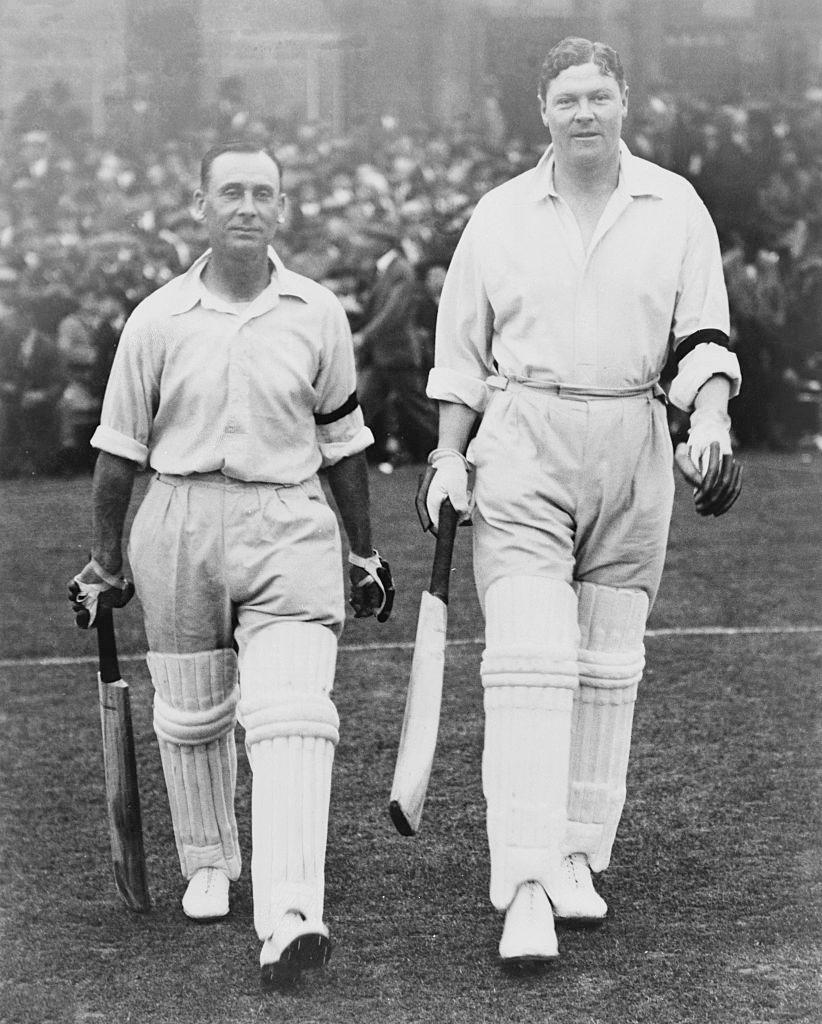
Hobbs and Chapman at the first Test against Australia at Trent Bridge, Birmingham, 13 June 1930.

Following the end of the 1928–29 tour, Chapman did not return to England until July, midway through the cricket season; Jack White and Arthur Carr captained England in his absence. Chapman resumed playing for Kent shortly after his return home but appeared in only seven matches, with a top-score of 28. His season was curtailed when he fell awkwardly while fielding in a match against Sussex at the beginning of August. He also missed the two MCC tours that winter to New Zealand and West Indies, neither of which involved a full-strength team.

In 1930, Australia toured England once more. Before the Test series, Chapman was not a unanimous choice among press correspondents; several critics believed he should not be in the team on account of his rapidly increasing weight—former England captain Pelham Warner suggested he needed to lose at least two stone—and concern over his poor batting form. However, Chapman began the season well, impressing commentators with his batting, fielding and captaincy, and was named as England captain for the first Test match. In the first innings, he scored 52 in 65 minutes, and England won the match by 93 runs on the fourth day. The Wisden correspondent wrote: "Chapman, with his resources limited, managed his bowling well and himself fielded in dazzling fashion." This was Chapman's sixth successive victory over Australia and he had won all nine of the Tests in which he was captain. However, it was to be his last Test victory.

England lost the second Test by seven wickets, and Gibson describes the match as the "turning point in Chapman's fortunes". Wisden observed: "Briefly, the Englishmen lost a match, which, with a little discretion on the last day, they could probably have saved." England scored 425 in their first innings, but Donald Bradman hit 254 runs and Australia reached 729 for six declared. When Chapman came in to bat in the second innings, England still trailed by 163 runs and had lost four wickets—a fifth fell soon after. He attacked the bowling immediately, and shared a large partnership with Gubby Allen. When the latter was out, Chapman began to score even faster. He took England into the lead, hitting out at almost every delivery to reach his only Test century after 140 minutes' batting. Wisden commented: "It was about this time that, with a little care and thoughtfulness, England might have saved the game ... So far from devoting their energies to defence they continued hitting away, adding another 113 runs in an hour and a quarter afterwards but losing their last five wickets." Chapman was finally dismissed for 121, after batting for 155 minutes and striking 12 fours and 4 sixes. England were all out for 375, leaving Australia needing to score 72 runs to win. Although Chapman held a difficult catch from Bradman which was praised by commentators, Australia won comfortably. Chapman's century made him the first batsman to score centuries at Lord's in the University match, in the Gentlemen v Players game and for England in a Test match; only Martin Donnelly later performed a similar feat, though his Test century was scored for New Zealand. As the Gentlemen v Players match ceased in 1962, the feat will never be repeated.

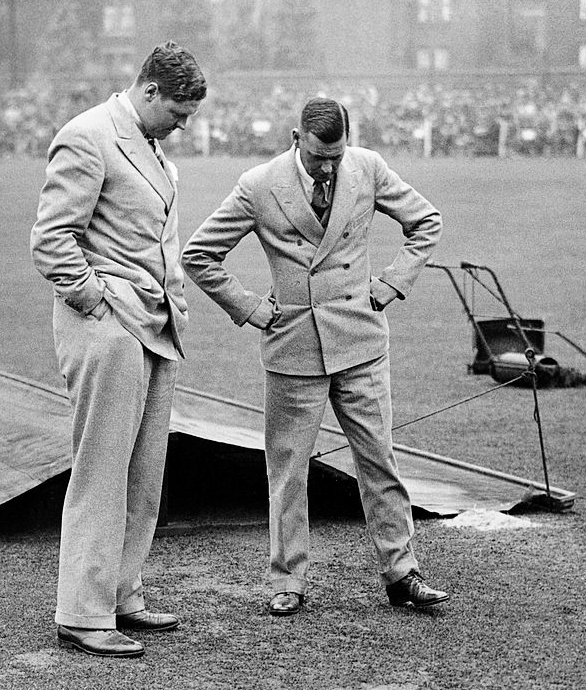
Heavy rain on the third day of the third England-Australia Test at Headingley delayed the match. The team captains Chapman (left) and Woodfull are inspecting the field on 14 July 1930.

In the immediate aftermath of the game, Chapman was praised for his batting; the team and selectors, rather than Chapman, were blamed for the defeat. However, his captaincy and tactics were later criticised, by Pelham Warner among others. In particular, his placement of fielders and his refusal to play defensively were questioned. Gibson notes that historians regard this match as a turning point in Test matches; afterwards, captains became more concerned to avoid defeat rather than follow Chapman's policy of playing entertaining, attacking cricket whatever the result. Chapman's unwillingness to play for a draw was in later years held up as "the last sporting gesture by an England captain".

In the third Test, Bradman made the highest individual score in a Test match by scoring 334 out of Australia's 566. Assisted by rain that shortened the available playing time, England drew the match. Chapman scored 45 in his only innings. The fourth Test match was also badly affected by rain which brought about another draw. Chapman now faced further criticism of his captaincy. His field placings were again queried; Warner noted that Chapman's tactics were poor and that he was slow to react to the opposition. According to cricket writer Leo McKinstry, the selectors lost faith in Chapman on account of his inconsistent, risky batting and his increased tactical shortcomings. However, McKinstry also writes that the selectors and other influential members of the cricketing establishment were privately concerned by Chapman's heavy drinking which they felt was affecting his leadership. There were also rumours that he was drunk during some sessions of the fourth Test. Following an extended meeting of the selectors, Chapman was left out of the side and replaced as captain by Bob Wyatt. The press were united in attacking the decision, praising Chapman's batting and captaincy while denigrating Wyatt's lack of experience. Gibson observes: "In 1930, despite the occasional criticisms, Chapman's position did not seem in any danger. He was still the popular, boyish, debonair hero. He had been having his most successful series with the bat, and as a close fieldsman England still did not contain his equal. He could not seriously be blamed because the English bowlers could not get Bradman out (though this was perhaps more apparent in retrospect than at the time). Wyatt, though nothing was known against him ... was a figure markedly lacking in glamour."

In the final Test, Bradman scored another century and England lost the match and series, although Wyatt played a substantial innings, and Wisden conceded Chapman could have made little difference except as a fielder. The two men remained friends during and after the controversy. In comparing circumstances of Chapman's appointment with those of his replacement by Wyatt, Gibson writes: "In 1926, England won: in 1930, England lost. That is why the echoes took so long to die down and why the selectors remained villains." He concludes that, even though Wyatt did relatively well, "It does seem, after all these years, an odd decision to have taken." In the series, Chapman scored 259 runs at 43.16. In all first-class cricket, he passed four figures for the final time, reaching 1,027 runs at an average of 29.34.

=== South Africa tour 1930–31 ===
Already chosen as tour captain before the final 1930 Ashes Test, Chapman led an MCC team to a 1–0 series defeat in South Africa the following winter. Several first-choice players were not selected and the team suffered from injuries and illness. Chapman was popular with the crowds but made a poor start to the tour with the bat until he scored more substantially in the lead-up to the Test series. England lost the opening match of the series by 28 runs and the other four were drawn. Needing to win the final match to level the series, England were frustrated when the start of the match was delayed. Chapman won the toss and chose to bowl on a damp pitch which would have favoured his bowlers. However, the umpires discovered the bails were the wrong size and would not start the game until new ones could be made; in the 20 minutes which were lost, the pitch dried out and England lost much of the advantage of bowling first. Chapman made an official protest before leading his team onto the field. In the series, he scored 75 runs at 10.71, and 471 runs at 27.70 in all first-class games. Wisden observed that "without finding his full powers as a punishing hitter, Chapman occasionally batted well". Socially, the tour was more successful. Chapman was accompanied by his wife, and his parents joined the tour for a time. He took part in many social events and visited several whiskey firms which were associated with his employers in England.

Chapman played no further Test cricket; in 26 Tests, he scored 925 runs at an average of 28.90 and held 32 catches. He captained England in 17 matches, winning nine and losing two with the others drawn. Under him the team achieved seven consecutive victories, equalling the English record, which was not surpassed until 2004. His nine victories came in his first nine games as captain. (Note: The team won seven Tests in succession between 1927 and 1928. Chapman won his first nine games as captain, but others captained England when he did not play within this sequence.)

== Later career ==
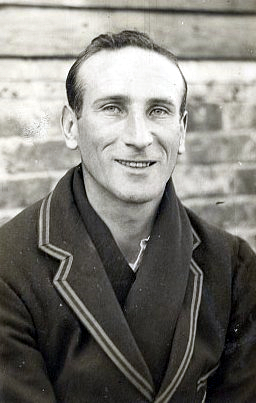
Douglas Jardine succeeded Chapman as England captain in 1931.

=== Kent captain ===
Although Chapman lost the England captaincy after the South African tour, he became official captain of Kent in 1931, having previously captained the side occasionally. Wisden commented that Chapman "exercised an invigorating influence" on the side. Before Chapman assumed the Kent captaincy, the county team was sharply divided along social lines and the amateur leadership was aloof from and often dismissive of the professional players. Members of the team felt that he improved the atmosphere within the side and made the game enjoyable. Critics and players thought that he was past his best by the time he became captain, and already affected by alcoholism, but Chapman was successful as leader. His fielding remained influential. However, his batting form was poor: in 1931, he scored 662 runs at an average of 18.38. Sections of the press thought he should remain England captain, but he was replaced as Test captain by Jardine, who was not a popular choice; the selectors chose Jardine to exercise more discipline on the team than Chapman had done. At the end of the season, Chapman toured Jamaica in a team captained by Lord Tennyson and scored 203 runs in first-class matches at 33.83.

Chapman began the 1932 season in good form and appeared fitter than he had for many seasons. There were further calls in the press for him to captain England. Jardine's captaincy in 1931 left critics unimpressed and C. Stewart Caine, the editor of Wisden, wrote that "the impression appears to be widely entertained that Chapman, were he in [batting] form, would again be given charge of the [England] team." Christopher Douglas believes that the difference between Jardine and Chapman in captaincy style made it harder for the press to accept Jardine. He writes: "Chapman's was just the kind of daredevil approach that is remembered with affection and, even though it was barely a year since he had lost the leadership, his reign was being regarded through rose-coloured specs." However, it is unlikely that the selectors ever considered returning to him. During the season, Chapman scored 951 runs, averaged 29.71, and led Kent to third place in the County Championship for the second year in succession.

=== Decline ===
In 1933, he scored 834 runs but his average fell to 21.94 and he never again averaged over 23 in any season in which he played regularly. Owing to his increasing weight and lack of physical fitness, he found batting much harder. As his physique declined, he was unable to produce the same batting feats he had managed previously. In the field, although still catching effectively, his inability to chase the ball meant he fielded closer to the batsmen; he also took fewer catches. In both 1934 and 1935, he averaged around 22 with the bat and scored under 800 runs. In 1935, he scored his final first-class century, against Somerset, having not reached the landmark since 1931. Teammates and observers noticed that in the final years of his career, Chapman frequently left the field during matches, and they suspected he was drinking in the pavilion.

Chapman played infrequently in 1936, and the captaincy was shared between him and two others. He was reluctant to bat, to the extent of dropping down the batting order to avoid doing so, and his friends believed that his nerve had gone. At the end of the season, he announced that business commitments forced him to give up the captaincy. Over the following three seasons, Chapman played for Kent in three more matches: against the New Zealand touring side in 1937 and in two Championship games in 1938. He also captained a non-representative England XI in a festival game against the New Zealanders in 1937, batting at number ten in the order and scoring 61. His remaining first-class matches were low-profile games against Oxford and Cambridge Universities; he played 13 games in his final three seasons. In his last first-class game, in 1939, he captained MCC against Oxford, scoring 12 and 0. In all first-class cricket, Chapman scored 16,309 runs in 394 matches at an average of 31.97, and held 356 catches. By the time his career ended, his weight had increased even further, and Lemmon believes that he had become an embarrassment to other cricketers. Subsequently, Chapman faded away without much comment.

== Technique and critical judgements ==
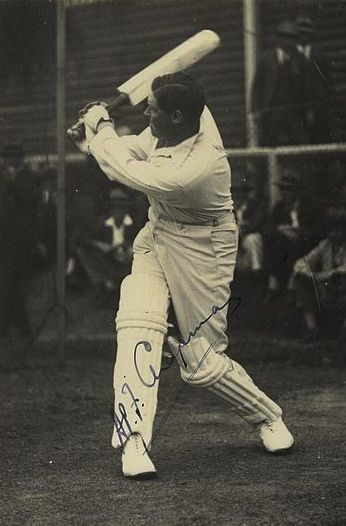
Chapman batting in Australia in 1928

Writer Neville Cardus described Chapman as "the schoolboy's dream of the perfect captain of an England cricket eleven. He was tall, slim, always youthful, and pink and chubby of face. His left-handed batting mingled brilliance and grace ... His cricket was romantic in its vaunting energy but classic in shape." While batting, Chapman always tried to attack the bowling; although this meant he made mistakes which resulted in his dismissal, it meant that he could change the course of a game in a short time. Cricket writer R. C. Robertson-Glasgow described him as: "Tall, strong, and lithe, he was a left-handed hitter with orthodox defence, much of which was rendered unnecessary by a vast reach, and an ability to drive good-length balls over the head of mid-off, bowler, and mid-on. His cover-driving, too, was immensely strong." Gibson notes that Chapman's career batting figures were good, but that critics believed that, with his talent, he should have scored more runs. Gibson writes: "When Chapman was going well, he looked quite as good as Woolley [his Kent and England team-mate] at the other end, and in the mid-1920s there was no other English left-hander, possibly no other England batsman at all except Hobbs, of whom that could be said." His increased weight in the 1930s robbed him of confidence and slowed him down to the point where his batting declined. When batting, Chapman usually wore the Quidnuncs cap. (Note: The Quidnuncs Cricket Club was a club for former Cambridge cricket Blues.)

Commentators claimed that Chapman was not a subtle captain and lacked tactical astuteness. Even so, his record is better than most others who led England during Chapman's career. Pelham Warner believed that Chapman started well, but that in the later stages of 1930, his tactical sense markedly deteriorated. On the other hand, several of Chapman's contemporaries believed him to be one of the best captains. Arthur Gilligan, one of Chapman's predecessors, considered him to be a model for the role, and Bert Oldfield, who played against Chapman as Australia's wicket-keeper, thought that Chapman possessed an "aptitude" for leadership. Chapman's teams were usually harmonious and his sympathetic handling of his players often brought out the best in them. Writing in 1943, Robertson-Glasgow said: "He knew his men as perhaps no other captain of modern times has known them." Cricket writer E. W. Swanton believes that Chapman's cavalier reputation was misleading in assessing his effectiveness, and that "underlying the boyish facade was both a shrewd cricket brain and the good sense to ask advice from those of greater experience."

Robertson-Glasgow described Chapman as among the greatest fielders of all time, and The Times observed that "at his best he had been one of the finest fielders ever to play for England". In his earlier years, he fielded in the deep but when he played for Kent and England, he was positioned closer to the batsmen—usually at gully or silly point. The Cricketer commented that his "capacious hands made him a brilliant close-to-the-wicket fielder, and some of his catches were miraculous". In his youth, Chapman bowled quite regularly, but his negative experience bowling for Berkshire lessened his enthusiasm, and he did not take it seriously.

== Personal life ==
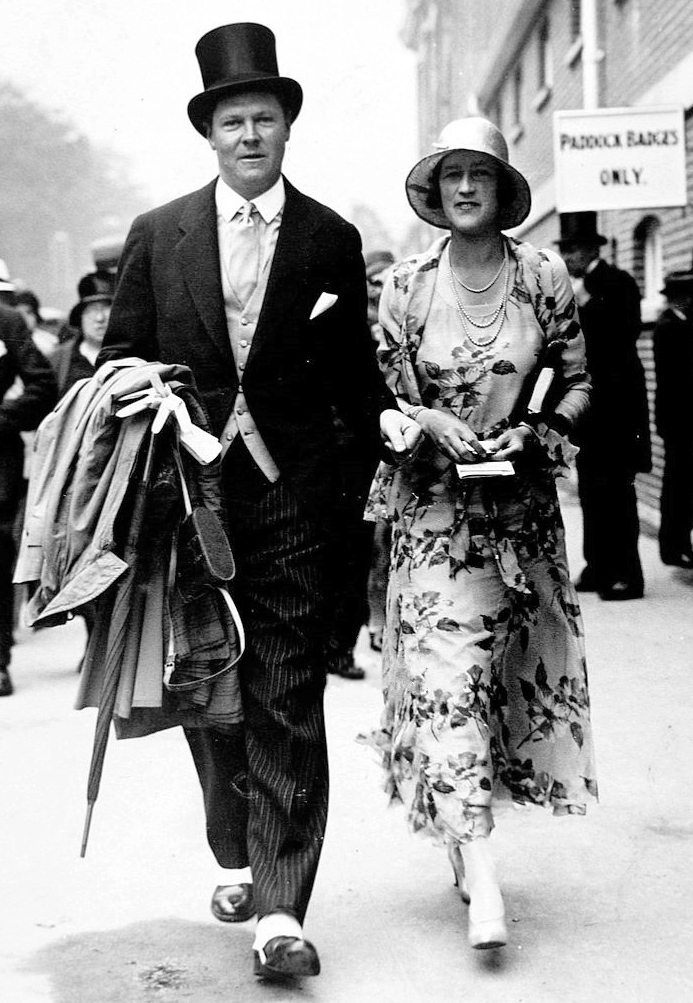
Chapman with his wife Gertrude in 1930

=== Marriage and fame ===
During May 1921, Chapman met Gertrude ("Beet" or "Beety") Lowry, the sister of Tom Lowry, a cricketer from New Zealand who played for Cambridge and Somerset and went on to captain his country. The couple met again when Chapman toured New Zealand in 1922–23, and became engaged. At the end of the 1924–25 Australia tour, they married and returned to England together. The wedding was widely reported and until the end of the decade the couple were heavily involved in social events. They were popular guests at functions, and became notable figures in the fashionable society of the upper classes. In 1923, Chapman joined a Kent brewery, H & G Symonds. His wife believed that his choice of a career working in the alcohol trade made his life difficult and contributed to his heavy drinking. The social duties associated with his job also contributed to his increased weight and failing fitness in the later part of his cricket career. Further problems arose through his fame; as he wanted to keep people happy, he drank frequently and attended many social functions. Cricket writer Ivo Tennant believes that Chapman's "taste for conviviality was his undoing". He always appeared happy, but Gibson observes "that is the way some men disguise their unhappiness", and Lemmon suggests that Chapman was seeking acceptance and felt lonely at heart. According to Lemmon, by the end of the Second World War, Chapman was largely living in the past, and that "mentally he was still in the happy days of University cricket."

=== Later struggle ===
E. W. Swanton observes that "from the war onwards [Chapman's] life went into a sad eclipse." In 1942, Chapman was divorced from his wife; according to Lemmon, "Beet had stood much, but there is a point for all relationships beyond which one must not go". She returned to live in New Zealand in 1946. After 1946, Chapman shared a house with the steward of West Hill Golf Club, Bernard Benson, and his health continued to deteriorate. He was frequently observed to be drunk in public, although his appearance and manners remained impeccable; the cricket establishment ignored him, regarding him as an embarrassment, particularly on the occasions he watched matches at Lord's. By the end of his life, he was unable to attend any cricket matches. In addition to his alcoholism, Chapman became increasingly isolated, suffering from loneliness and depression. By the 1950s, he had developed arthritis, probably as a result of his sporting activities. On one occasion in 1955, Chapman was invited to a dinner organised by Kent; he was later discovered in the car park on the bumper of a car in a distressed state and had to be assisted back inside.

In September 1961, Chapman fractured his knee when he fell at his home. He was taken to hospital at Alton, Hampshire, for an operation but died on 16 September 1961. The newspapers reported that he had been ill for a long time; his former wife later commented that "he must have died a very sad man". Tributes focused on his successes as a cricketer and appealing personality. Summing up Chapman's life, Gibson writes: "But just as a good end can redeem a sad life, so a good life can redeem a sad end, and he had known his hours, his years of glory." Swanton concluded his obituary of Chapman in 1961: "The elderly and the middle-aged will recall him rather in his handsome sunlit youth, the epitome of all that was gay and fine in the game of cricket."

== Bibliography ==
- Douglas, Christopher (2002). Douglas Jardine: Spartan Cricketer. London: Methuen. ISBN 0-413-77216-0.
- Gibson, Alan (1979). The Cricket Captains of England. London: Cassell. ISBN 0-304-29779-8.
- Lemmon, David (1985). Percy Chapman: a biography. London: Queen Anne Press. ISBN 0-356-10458-3.
- Marshall, Michael (1987). Gentlemen and Players: Conversations with Cricketers. London: Grafton Books. ISBN 0-246-11874-1.
- McKinstry, Leo (2011). Jack Hobbs: England's Greatest Cricketer. London: Yellow Jersey Press. ISBN 978-0-224-08329-4.
- Peebles, Ian (1978). Spinner's Yarn. Newton Abbot: Readers Union Ltd.
- Robertson-Glasgow, R. C. (1943). Cricket Prints: Some Batsmen and Bowlers, 1920–1940. London: T. Werner Laurie Ltd. OCLC 3257334.
- Swanton, E. W. (1999). Cricketers of My Time. London: André Deutsch. ISBN 0-233-99746-6.
