= R. A. Bennett's cricket team in the West Indies in 1901–02 =

International cricket tour

After a gap of five years the fourth team of English cricketers toured the West Indies in the 1901-02 season. The team was organized by H. D. G. Leveson Gower, who was unable to tour, and captained by Mr. R. A. Bennett. Like earlier touring parties it consisted solely of amateurs. They played a total of 19 matches, of which 13 are regarded as first-class, between January and April 1902.

== Touring party ==
A party of just 11 was taken:

- Mr. R.A. Bennett, Captain
- Mr. R.N.R. Blaker
- Mr. B.J.T. Bosanquet
- Mr. T.H.K. Dashwood
- Mr. E.W. Dillon
- Mr. E.M. Dowson
- Mr. F.L. Fane
- Mr. F.H. Hollins
- Mr. E.C. Lee
- Mr. A.D. Whatman
- Mr. E.R. Wilson

Mr. Lionel Gough Arbuthnot played a number of matches and must have accompanied the tourists. Whatman was the only one of the tourists to have been on one of the earlier tours, having been part of Lord Hawke's team in 1896-97 but had not played any first class cricket between the two tours. Bennett himself and Dashwood had not played first class cricket since 1899 but the remaining eight had played in 1901. Many of the tourists were ex-Oxbridge cricketers, five of them having played in the 1901 Oxford v Cambridge match. The team was younger than the previous touring teams and although inexperienced was at least the standard of the two 1896–97 teams. Wilson received a telegram on his arrival announcing the death of his mother and Dowson was also unavailable for the first game having a cold. Even with Arbuthnot playing an additional player was required and J.A. Davenport made up the 11. A.G. Robinson played in a minor match on the tour.

Bosanquet, Dowson and Wilson had been amongst the team that had recently toured North America in September and October 1901.

The team left Southampton on January 8.

== Matches ==
Matches played were:

- January 22, 23, 24 : v Barbados
- January 25 : v United Services (in Barbados), a fill-up game
- January 27, 28 : v Barbados
- January 29, 30 : v West Indies (in Barbados)
- January 31, February 1 : v W. Bowring's XI (in Barbados), a fill-up game
- February 8, 10 : v Jamaica
- February 11 : v XVI Colts (in Jamaica), an odds match
- February 12, 13 : v Jamaica Born
- February 14, 15 : v Jamaica
- February 18, 19 : v St. Elizabeth C.C. (in Jamaica), 12-a-side
- February 21, 22 : v Combined Jamaica/United Services XI (in Jamaica)
- March 5, 6 : v Grenada & St. Vincent (in Grenada)
- March 6, 7 : v Grenada & St. Vincent (in Grenada)
- March 10, 11, 12 : v Trinidad, 12-a-side
- March 14, 15 : v Trinidad, 12-a-side
- March 20, 21 : v West Indies (in Trinidad)
- March 31, April 1, 2 : v British Guiana
- April 4, 5, 7 : v West Indies (in British Guiana)
- April 7, 8, 9, 10 : v British Guiana

First class matches are highlighted.

Of the 13 first class matches, 8 were won and 5 lost. Overall 13 matches were won, 5 lost and 1 drawn. The standard of cricket was noticeably weaker in Jamaica than in Barbados and all 6 matches there were won, several by an innings.

With Dowson and Wilson unavailable for the first game against Barbados the tourists' bowling was very weak and they lost heavily. They gained revenge in the second match with a full bowling attack. The West Indies team in the third game consisted of players from Trinidad, British Guiana and Barbados and was won by the West Indies. Two further matches against a combined team were played in Trinidad and British Guiana, the West Indies winning the match in Trinidad and the tourists that in British Guiana.

Wilson, Dowson and Bosanquet were the most successful bowlers. Bosanquet led the batting with 623 runs in the first class games at an average of 34. Dowson scored the only first class century by the tourists with 112 against the West Indies in British Guiana.

== Averages ==
The following averages are in the 13 first class matches (Batting Bowling).

=== Batting ===
Player	P	I	NO	R	HS	Ave	100	50	C/S
BJT Bosanquet	13	22	4	623	73	34.61	-	5	13
ER Wilson	12	17	1	402	81	25.12	-	2	12
FH Hollins	12	20	4	382	74	23.87	-	3	19
FL Fane	13	22	2	456	56*	22.80	-	2	7
EM Dowson	12	17	1	342	112	21.37	1	-	8
EW Dillon	13	21	0	417	54	19.85	-	2	6
AD Whatman	13	18	4	200	60	14.28	-	1	11/4
RNR Blaker	13	19	0	256	55	13.47	-	1	12
RA Bennett	10	13	2	141	32*	12.81	-	-	15/17
EC Lee	13	18	0	224	53	12.44	-	1	13
THK Dashwood	13	19	1	200	32	11.11	-	-	10
Lionel Gough Arbuthnot	7	11	6	44	17*	8.80	-	-	2
JA Davenport	1	2	0	0	0	0.00	-	-	-

=== Bowling ===
Player	O	M	R	W	BB	Ave	5i	10m
ER Wilson	414.1	144	767	67	7-16	11.44	5	1
EM Dowson	404.5	121	997	80	8-21	12.46	5	1
RNR Blaker	30	9	74	5	2-1	14.80	-	-
EW Dillon	122	24	325	20	3-18	16.25	-	-
BJT Bosanquet	338.3	92	906	55	8-30	16.47	5	-
FH Hollins	3	0	20	1	1-20	20.00	-	-
EC Lee	17	5	56	1	1-41	56.00	-	-
AD Whatman	9	3	23	0				

== Annual reviews ==
- Wisden Cricketers' Almanack 1903
