= Thomas Dashwood =

English cricketer

Personal information
- Full name: Thomas Henry Knyvett Dashwood
- Born: 3 January 1876; St Ippollitts, Hertfordshire, England
- Died: 24 January 1929 (aged 53); Fulham, London, England
- Batting: Right-handed

Domestic team information
- Years: Team
- 1898–1907: Hertfordshire
- 1899: Oxford University
- 1904: Hampshire

Career statistics
Competition	First-class
Matches	18
Runs scored	334
Batting average	11.92
100s/50s	–/1
Top score	70
Catches/stumpings	15/–
- Source: Cricinfo, 17 January 2010

Thomas Henry Knyvett Dashwood (3 January 1876 – 24 January 1929) was an English first-class cricketer.

The son of T. A. Dashwood, he was born in January 1876 at St Ippollitts, Hertfordshire. He was educated at Wellington College, where he captained the cricket eleven. From there, he matriculated to University College, Oxford. While studying at Oxford, Dashwood made two appearances in first-class cricket for Oxford University Cricket Club against Surrey and Sussex in 1899; against Sussex, he made what would be his only half century, with a score of 70. He also played a third first-class match in 1899, for an England XI against the touring Australians at Truro.

After graduating from Oxford, Dashwood was later chosen to tour the West Indies with Richard Bennett's personal eleven from January–April 1902. On the tour, he made thirteen first-class appearances on the touring, appearing against regional first-class colonial teams such as British Guinea, Jamaica, and Trinidad, in addition to the West Indies cricket team. On the tour, he scored 200 runs at an average of 11.11, with a highest score of 32. Dashwood recorded a century in a non-first-class fixture on the tour, with 120 not out against St Elizabeth Cricket Club in Jamaica. Two years later, he made two final first-class appearances for Hampshire in the 1904 County Championship against Leicestershire and Yorkshire. He also played cricket at minor counties level for Hertfordshire, making sixteen appearances in the Minor Counties Championship between 1898 and 1907.

Dashwood later served in the British Army during the First World War, being commissioned into the Army Service Corps as a temporary second lieutenant in September 1915. He was made a temporary lieutenant in January 1916, with a further temporary appointment to captain following in June 1916. Following the war, he was made a brevet major in June 1919. Dashwood relinquished his commission following the completion of his service, retaining the rank of captain. He died in London at West Kensington on 24 January 1929, from heart failure as a result of influenza.
