= Lord Hawke's cricket team in Australia and New Zealand in 1902–03 =

International cricket tour

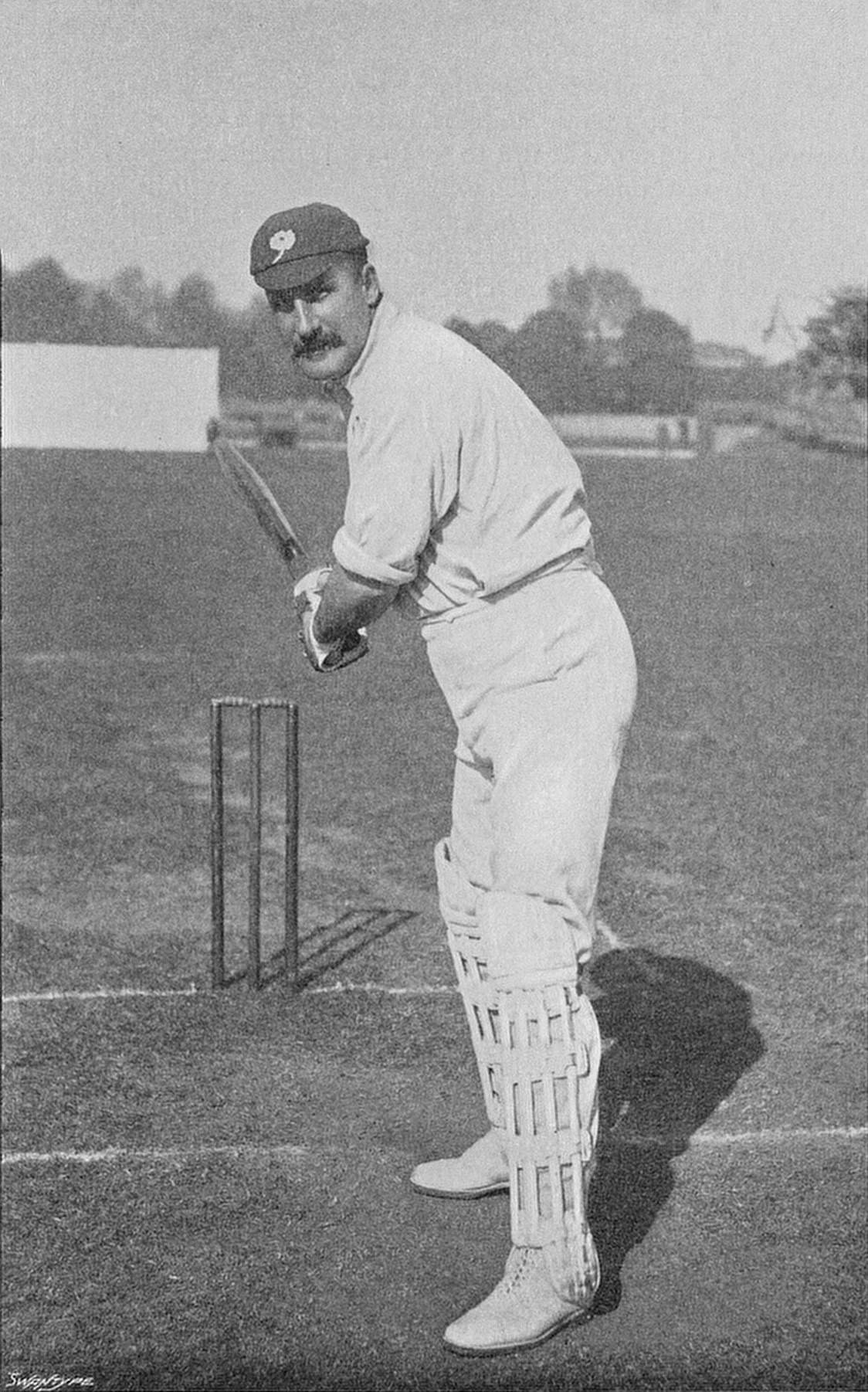
Martin Bladen Hawke, 7th Baron Hawke of Towton, known as Lord Hawke, who organised and funded the tour but was unable to play due to injury.

Lord Hawke selected a cricket team of ten amateurs and two professional players to tour Australia and New Zealand from November 1902 until March 1903. After an opening game in San Francisco, the tour began of eighteen matches – seven of them considered first-class – in New Zealand followed by three further first-class games in Australia. Hawke's team was the first to tour Australasia with New Zealand as the primary destination and, as was the norm at the time, was privately run and funded. The Australian leg of the tour was a "profit making venture", however the games in New Zealand were scheduled at the behest of the New Zealand Cricket Board in order to raise the profile of cricket in the country. Two of them were against a New Zealand cricket team, before its international Test status. The inclusion of such games on the tour were considered "a sign that cricket in New Zealand was starting to be taken more seriously, and a move towards official international status was possible."

Hawke's team was a strong one, including Pelham Warner, Bernard Bosanquet and Frederick Fane, and it was victorious in all eighteen matches of the New Zealand tour, though it was defeated in two of the three matches in Australia.

== Hawke's team ==
Hawke had intended to captain the team, but was unable to make the tour after breaking his collarbone the day before the team left England. Hawke asked Warner to captain the team, which was referred to throughout as "Lord Hawke's team".

The team was as follows: Warner opened the batting; his opening partner was Cambridge University alumni and MCC cricketer Cuthbert Burnup, a right-handed batsman and useful right-arm slow bowler; Fane, a right-handed batsman for England and Essex; Tom Taylor, a Yorkshire right-hand batsman and wicketkeeper; Edward Dowson, of Surrey; leading all-round cricketer Bosanquet; George Thompson of Northamptonshire and John Stanning of the MCC; Randall Johnson of the MCC; Arthur Whatman who also kept wicket; Albert Leatham and Sam Hargreave. Nat Williams, who was living in New Zealand at the time, played in seven of the minor matches in New Zealand when members of the original team were injured or otherwise unavailable.

== The tour ==
The team stopped in California in the United States on their way to New Zealand, playing against a California XI at the Presidio Athletic Ground in San Francisco in front of five-hundred spectators. A non-first-class game, California were entitled to play eighteen players, with Bosanquet taking 11 of the wickets to fall as the hosts were dismissed for 125. Hawke's team made it to 155/8 thanks to half-centuries from Bosanquet and Warner, having been allowed to bat on beyond the winning total.

=== New Zealand ===
Hawke's team landed in New Zealand and played their opening first-class game against Auckland on 19 December. Hawke's team took an innings victory, with Fane scoring 82 in their first innings total of 321 all out. Auckland, with scores of 120 and 72 following on, fell to a heavy defeat. Five minor provincial matches followed: Taranaki, North Taranaki, Wanganui, Manawatu and Hawke's Bay all played the touring team and were all defeated, with Bosanquet scoring a century in the last of these matches. Wellington cricket team then played Hawke's XI on 15 January, posting 243 in their first innings that Hawke's team could only move 46 runs clear of before being dismissed. Wellington, however, fell to 140-all out thanks to 7/51 by George Thompson, with Warner and Cuthbert Burnup reaching the target of 95 without loss. The Wellington match drew 15,000 spectators, and takings of 650 pounds, a record for a cricket match in New Zealand at the time.

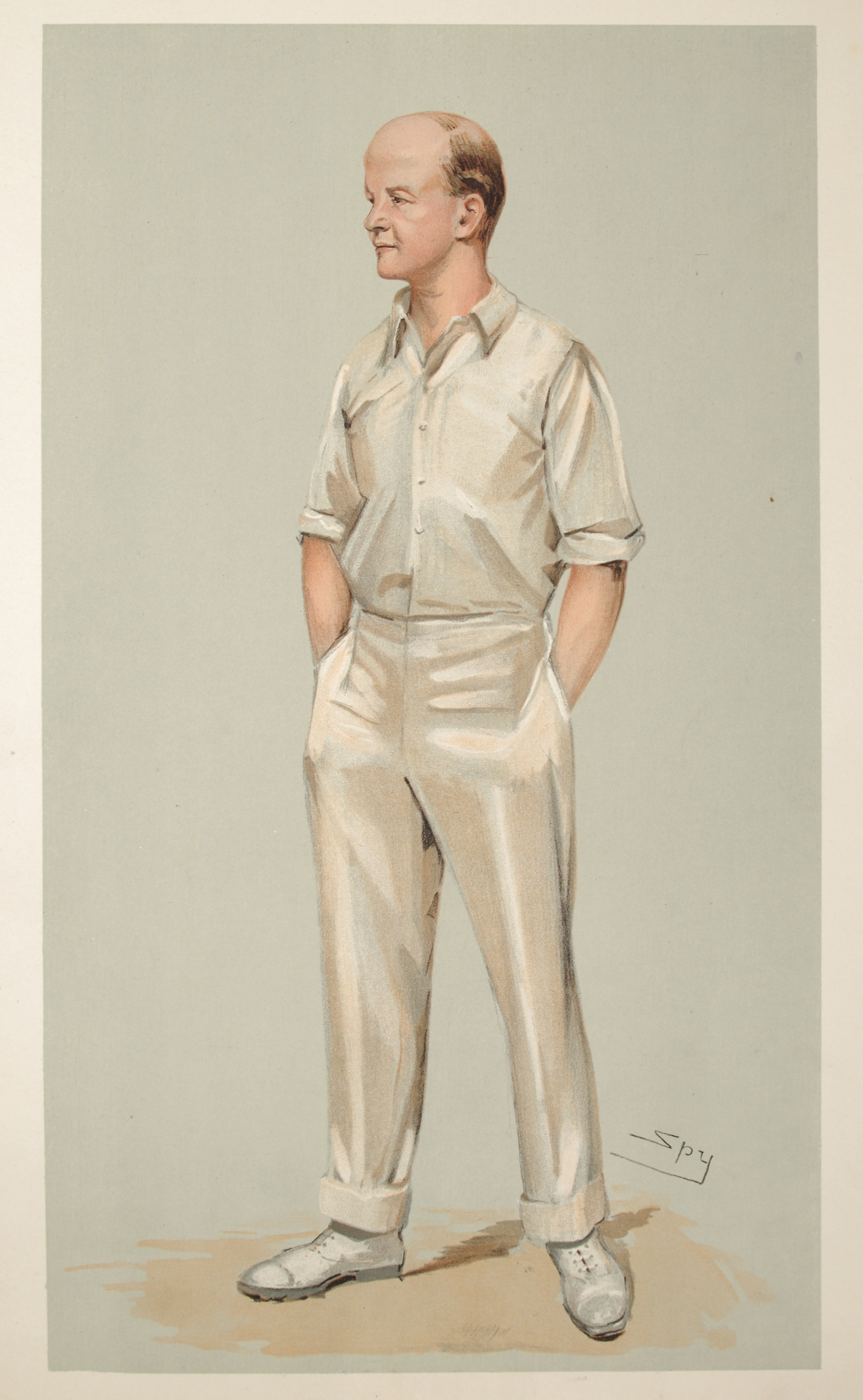
Plum Warner, who captained Hawke's XI and scored a double-century on the tour.

Four more minor provincial games followed: Wairarapa, Marlborough, Nelson and Westland. Then Hawke's team defeated Canterbury by 133 runs on 6 February, with half-centuries for Warner and Burnup, and then Otago by an innings and 230 runs on 13 February, with a five-wicket haul for Burnup and a double-century for Warner. There was controversy during the Canterbury match. Bosanquet was the fourth bowler used in by Hawke's team during the second innings and with his third ball, it looked as if he had bowled Walter Pearce behind his legs as he attempted a big hit. However, both umpires were unsighted and the non-striker Arthur Sims, who also had his view obscured, urged Pearce not to leave the middle. The tourists' wicket keeper, Arthur Whatman, Bosanquet and other English players surrounded the umpire, who decided Pearce was not out. Bosanquet then turned to Sims and said: "You're a nice cheat. I bowled him round his legs. Anybody could see that." Sims responded that there was reasonable doubt, but Whatman began to swear and call him a cheat. The English team were severely criticised in the press and Sims' employers refused to release him for any further matches unless Bosanquet apologised. Bosanquet wrote letters of apology to Sims and to the Canterbury Cricket Association, and Sims later told him to forget about it, but Sims' employers would not let him take part in the remaining games.

After victory in a minor match against Southland, South Island were defeated by an innings on 21 February, with a century made by Tom Taylor.

After defeating South Canterbury in a minor match on 25 February, Hawke's team played two games against New Zealand. New Zealand were dismissed for 164 in the first innings of the first of these two games, which began on 27 February. Thompson took 6/38. Fane then scored 124 runs of Hawke's 304 all out, and then Thompson (4/74) and Bosanquet (4/44) restricted New Zealand to 214, leaving Hawke's team 75 runs to get. They reached the target for the loss of only three wickets. The second match on 4 March saw a century from New Zealand's Daniel Reese, and another for Warner, before Burnup's 5/8 from 4.5 overs handed Hawke's team an innings victory.

=== Australia ===
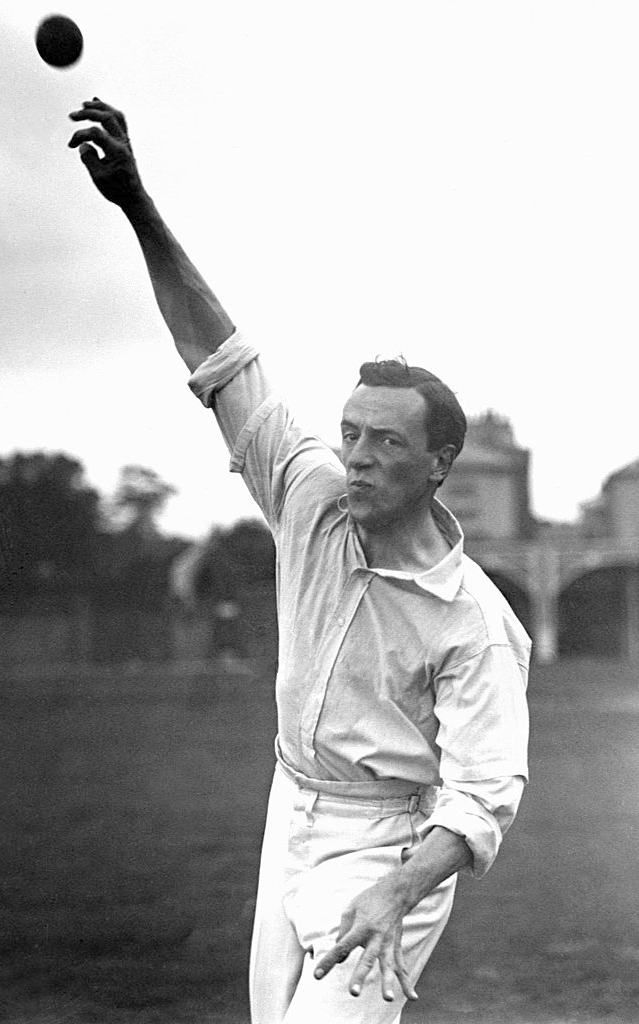
Bosanquet's bowling action for the leg break, photographed by George Beldam in 1906. His actions in New Zealand caused controversy, while in Australia many admired his delivery to dismiss Trumper.

Hawke's victorious team landed in Australia later in March, and played the opening game of three matches on 13 March at the Melbourne Cricket Ground. Hawke's XI had greater difficulty contending with the Australian Sheffield Shield teams, and were defeated by Victoria. They managed to draw their match against New South Wales at the Sydney Cricket Ground on 20 March with Albert Trott taking 6/88 and Reggie Duff scoring 194. Bosanquet also took 6/153 during the match, including the wicket of Victor Trumper, the leading Australian batsman and one of the best in the world at the time. He delivered two conventional leg breaks followed by a googly, later described by Bosanquet as the first bowled in Australia, which bowled Trumper. Many critics were impressed by the wicket-taking potential of googly bowling on hard pitches, and Warner later described Bosanquet's bowling as causing a sensation.

On 27 March at the Unley Oval, South Australia defeated Hawke's XI by 97 runs despite following on. Burnup and Taylor made centuries for Hawke's XI. In the second innings, South Australia's Henry Hay took 9/67 for the host team.
