= Edward Dowson =

Edward Dowson may refer to two cricketers, who were father and son:

- Edward Dowson (cricketer, born 1838) (1838–1922), Surrey cricketer
- Edward Dowson (cricketer, born 1880) (1880–1933), Surrey and Cambridge University cricketer
