= Hollins =

Hollins may refer to:

== Places ==
=== United States ===
- Hollins, Alabama, a census-designated place and unincorporated community
- Hollins, Virginia, a census-designated place
- Hollins, Roanoke, Virginia, a neighborhood of Roanoke
- Hollins Island, New York

=== England ===
- Hollins, Bolton, Greater Manchester
- Hollins, Bury, Greater Manchester
- Hollins, Cumbria
- Hollins, Derbyshire
- Hollins, Oldham, Greater Manchester, an area of Oldham
- Hollins, Rochdale, Greater Manchester
- Hollins, Kidsgrove, Staffordshire, a suburb
- Hollins Brook, Greater Manchester, a watercourse

== People and fictional characters ==
- Hollins (surname), a list of people and fictional characters

== Schools ==
- Hollins University, Virginia, United States, a private university
- The Hollins, Lancashire, England, a secondary school

== Other uses ==
- Hollins baronets, an extinct title in the Baronetage of the United Kingdom
