= Harry Hay (cricketer) =

Australian cricketer (1874–1960)

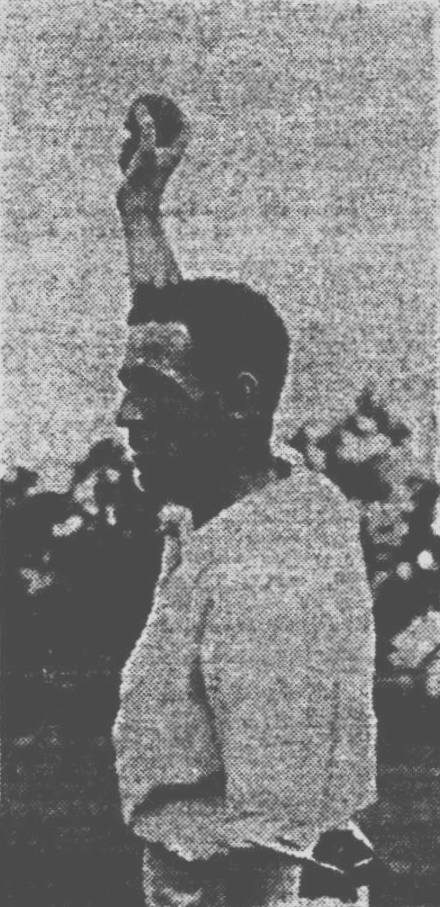

Personal information
- Full name: Henry Hay
- Born: 30 March 1874; Adelaide, South Australia
- Died: 16 May 1960 (aged 86); Adelaide, South Australia
- Batting: Right-handed
- Bowling: Right-arm medium

Domestic team information
- Years: Team
- 1902–03 to 1903–04: South Australia

Career statistics
Competition	First-class
Matches	5
Runs scored	54
Batting average	10.80
100s/50s	0/0
Top score	18 not out
Balls bowled	794
Wickets	16
Bowling average	27.31
5 wickets in innings	1
10 wickets in match	0
Best bowling	9/67
Catches/stumpings	2/0
- Source: Cricinfo, 10 February 2019

Harry Hay (30 March 1874 – 16 May 1960) was an Australian cricketer who played first-class cricket for South Australia in 1903 and 1904.

Harry Hay had a sensational first-class debut. After several years as a medium-pace bowler with Sturt in the Adelaide senior competition, he was called into the South Australian side as a last-minute replacement for the bowlers Ernie Jones and Harold Kirkwood, who were unavailable. South Australia were playing Lord Hawke's XI, in the last match of their long tour of New Zealand and Australia. Lord Hawke's XI batted first and made 553, with centuries to Cuthbert Burnup and Tom Taylor, Hay bowling inaccurately and taking no wickets for 70. South Australia were dismissed for 304 and followed on, eventually rallying in their second innings to make 454 and set Lord Hawke's XI 206 to win. South Australia's champion all-rounder George Giffen was injured and unable to bowl, so Harry Hay opened the bowling. He soon took the wickets of Burnup, Frederick Fane and Taylor, all bowled, with consecutive deliveries – a hat-trick. Not long afterwards he dismissed Pelham Warner (leg-before) and Bernard Bosanquet (bowled), also with consecutive deliveries, to leave Lord Hawke's XI struggling at 5 for 49. Eventually he bowled unchanged throughout the innings, dismissing every batsman except for one who was run out, and South Australia won by 97 runs. He had figures of 21.2–4–67–9. He was the first player to take a hat-trick on his first-class debut.

Hay played again for the state team in 1903–04 but took only seven wickets in four matches, and that was the end of his first-class career. After several more years of service for Sturt, he moved to Port Pirie in 1907 to take up a position as manager of the town's branch of the Savings Bank of South Australia. Before he left Adelaide he had also represented South Australia at Australian rules football and lacrosse.
