= Edward Lee (cricketer) =

English cricketer

Personal information
- Full name: Edward Cornwall Lee
- Born: 18 June 1877; Torquay, Devon, England
- Died: 16 June 1942 (aged 64); Petersfield, Hampshire, England
- Batting: Right-handed
- Bowling: Right-arm fast-medium
- Relatives: Arthur Lee (son)

Domestic team information
- Years: Team
- 1896–1909: Hampshire
- 1897–1900: Oxford University
- 1901–1909: Marylebone Cricket Club

Career statistics
Competition	First-class
Matches	85
Runs scored	1,764
Batting average	14.22
100s/50s	–/4
Top score	66*
Balls bowled	2,649
Wickets	39
Bowling average	32.15
5 wickets in innings	2
10 wickets in match	–
Best bowling	6/42
Catches/stumpings	59/–
- Source: Cricinfo, 18 February 2010

Edward Cornwall Lee (18 June 1877 – 16 June 1942) was an English first-class cricketer. As a first-class cricketer, Lee was most active during the late 1890s and at the turn of the 20th-century, playing varsity cricket for Oxford University and county cricket for Hampshire. His first-class career cricket on an infrequent basis to 1909, with Lee making a total of 85 appearances.

== Varsity and county cricket ==
The son of Edward Arthur Lee, he was born at Torquay in June 1877. Lee was educated at Winchester College, where he represented the college cricket team in two matches against Eton College. Following the conclusion of his final year at Winchester, Lee made his debut in first-class cricket for Hampshire against Yorkshire at Harrogate in the 1896 County Championship. From Winchester, he matriculated to University College, Oxford. A member of the Oxford University Cricket Club, he made two first-class appearances for the club in 1897, against Sussex and the Marylebone Cricket Club (MCC). During the summer break in 1897, Lee established himself in the Hampshire side, making eleven appearances in the latter half of that season. In 1898, he featured more regularly for Oxford University, making eight appearances. Wisden noted it was in the 1898 University Match at Lord's against Cambridge University that his most notable performance came, with him taking figures of 5 for 31 in the Cambridge first innings and match figures of 7 for 57, which contributed toward Oxford's nine wicket win. He also took his career best bowling figures of 6 for 42 that season for Oxford. He returned to Hampshire during the 1898 summer break, making nine appearances in the County Championship. Amongst his other achievements in 1898 were two first-class half centuries, scores of 66 not out for Oxford University (which would be his highest first-class score) and 52 for Hampshire.

Lee toured North America with P. F. Warner's XI during the winter of 1898, having been selected on the strength of his bowling for Oxford. In the 1899 English season, he resumed playing for Oxford University, making five appearances; he also appeared for an Oxford University Past and Present team against the touring Australians at Portsmouth. For Hampshire later that season, he made an additional ten appearances in the County Championship. Lee played his final season for Oxford in 1900, but only made three appearances. From his debut in 1897, he made eighteen first-class appearances for Oxford. In these, he scored 322 runs at an average of 12.88; with the ball, Lee took 29 wickets for at a bowling average of 17.65, with him taking both his career five wicket hauls for Oxford. Alongside his cricket, Lee also played golf and ice hockey for the university. He followed his final three appearances for Oxford with seven appearances for Hampshire later in the 1900 County Championship.

== Later cricket and life ==
Following his graduation from Oxford, Lee went into business in the City of London. In 1901, he first played for the MCC against Oxford University, in addition to making six appearances for Hampshire in the County Championship. From January to April 1902, Lee toured the West Indies with R. A. Bennett's XI, making thirteen first-class appearances on the tour; these came mostly against regional domestic teams, such as Barbados, British Guiana, Jamaica, Trinidad, in addition to the West Indies cricket team. He scored 224 runs on the tour at an average of 12.44, with one half century score of 53 against Jamaica Born. Following the tour, he played first-class cricket infrequently, with one appearance for Hampshire and five for the MCC prior to 1909. It was in 1909, that he made his final two first-class appearances, playing once for Hampshire against the touring Australians, and once for the MCC against Oxford University. For Hampshire, Lee made 46 first-class appearances, scoring 994 runs at an average of 14.61. Playing 85 first-class matches in total, Lee scored 1,764 runs at an average of 14.22, whilst with the ball, he took 39 wickets at a bowling average of 32.15.

Lee later served in World War I, being commissioned as a second lieutenant in the Royal Garrison Artillery in August 1916, with promotion to lieutenant following in February 1918. He died at his Petersfield residence in June 1942. His son, Arthur, was also a first-class cricketer.
