= Peter Randall Johnson =

English cricketer (1880-1959)

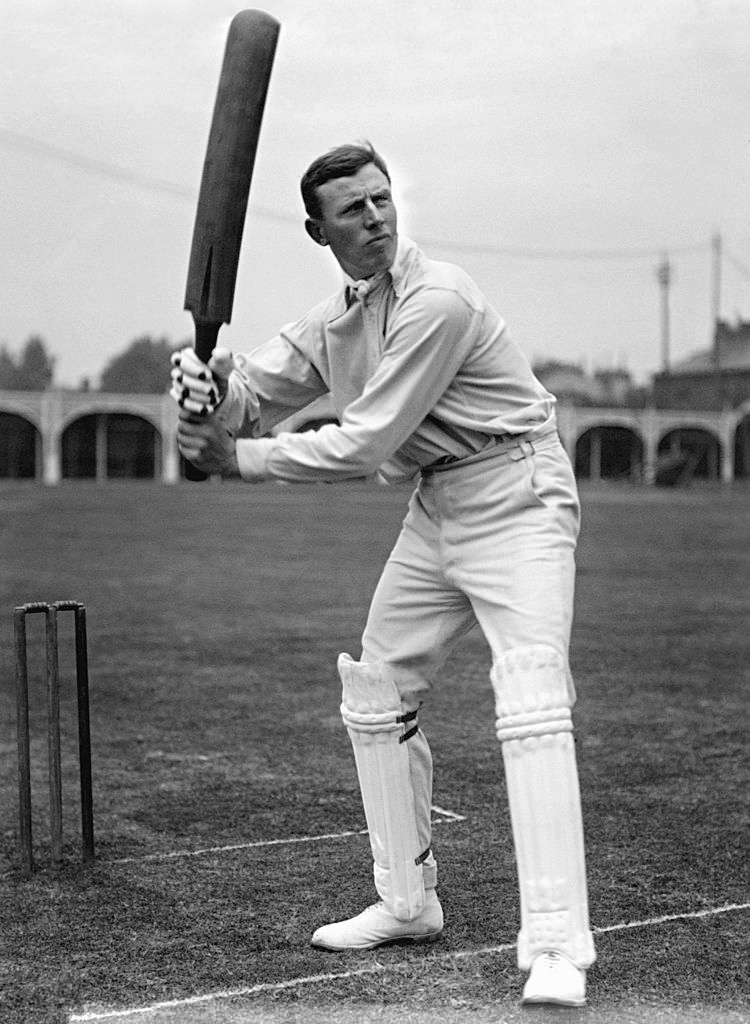

Personal information
- Full name: Peter Randall Johnson
- Born: 5 August 1880; Wellington, New Zealand
- Died: 1 July 1959 (aged 78); Sidmouth, Devon, England
- Batting: Right-handed
- Bowling: Right-arm fast
- Role: Batsman
- Relatives: George Randall Johnson (father); Richard Cubitt Johnson (uncle)

Domestic team information
- Years: Team
- 1900–1901: Cambridge University
- 1901–1927: Somerset
- FC debut: 7 May 1900 Cambridge University v A.J.Webbe's XI
- Last FC: 29 July 1927 Somerset v Glamorgan

Career statistics
Competition	First-class
Matches	275
Runs scored	11,931
Batting average	25.71
100s/50s	18/55
Top score	164
Balls bowled	1,136
Wickets	20
Bowling average	38.85
5 wickets in innings	0
10 wickets in match	0
Best bowling	4/99
Catches/stumpings	177/–
- Source: CricketArchive, 1 January 2009
- Education: Eton College
- Alma mater: Trinity College, Cambridge
- Father: George Randall Johnson

Peter Randall Johnson (5 August 1880 – 1 July 1959) was a cricketer who played for Cambridge University, Somerset and several amateur sides in a long first-class cricket career that stretched from 1900 to 1927. During his career, he appears to have been known, somewhat formally, as "P. R. Johnson"; modern websites refer to him as "Randall Johnson". Somerset colleague Jack MacBryan, who didn't like him, called him "Peter Johnson".

== Background ==
The son of George Randall Johnson who had captained Cambridge University at cricket in the 1850s and also played first-class cricket for Cambridgeshire, Johnson was born in New Zealand, where his father was a member of the state legislature from 1872 to 1890. He was educated at Eton College and Trinity College, Cambridge.

== Early cricket career ==
Johnson made his first-class debut for Cambridge University in a match against A. J. Webbe's XI in 1900, and played in five other first-class matches for the university side that season, without winning his blue. In his third game, he made 54 against Marylebone Cricket Club (MCC).

His record in 1901 was similar, with one score of over 50 – he made 55 in the Cambridge match against Yorkshire. But this time he was awarded his blue and played in the University match against Oxford University alongside his future Somerset county captain John Daniell. In this match and others in 1900 and 1901, Johnson was regarded as something of an all-rounder: he bowled right-arm fast, and took three second innings Oxford wickets for 41 runs in the 1901 University match. This was not his best bowling performance of the 1901 season. Against W. G. Grace's London County side, he took four for 99 and these remained the best bowling figures of his long career. In fact, 17 of the 20 wickets he took in his career came in these first two seasons: he bowled seldom after 1902, and after 1906 he bowled only twice more in first-class cricket.

In 1901 as well, Johnson made his debut for Somerset. The match was a first-class game against a South African side that did not play Tests. He opened the innings with Lionel Palairet and scored 11 and 46. Because the match was not a competitive one, questions of qualification for the county did not arise.

At the end of the English cricket season, Johnson joined a party of amateurs, most of them Oxford or Cambridge players and led by Bernard Bosanquet, on a tour of North America on which two first-class matches were played.

== County cricketer ==
From the 1902 season, Johnson began appearing in County Championship matches for Somerset. His qualification for the county would appear to have been fairly flimsy: there is a story, which is also told of a later Somerset cricketer, Tom Lowry, that the county put his birthplace down as Wellington, which was true, without bothering to volunteer that it was not, in fact, the town of that name in Somerset. Employed as a stockbroker, he had time for fairly regular appearances in 1902 and 1903, fewer in 1904 and 1905, and then more again in 1906. From then until the First World War, Johnson appeared in only a handful of matches in each season, but for five seasons from 1921 to 1925 he was nearly always in the Somerset side, finally retiring after a few unsuccessful matches in 1927.

The historian of Somerset cricket, David Foot, depicts Johnson as a dashing Edwardian figure, always sporting a silk cravat while playing. Foot quotes the writer Christopher Hollis on Johnson in the 1920s: "Always faultlessly dressed, it was his habit to drive up to a match arrayed in top hat and spotless morning coat."

Johnson's statistics indicate his increasing stature as a batsman. In 1902, he averaged only 14 runs per innings; the following year the average was in the mid 20s and, with some exceptions, it was mostly over 30 in the years up to 1914. There was progression, too, in his highest innings. In 1902, he increased his highest score to 62 with an innings that enabled Somerset to draw against the Australians. In 1903, he hit his first century, 110 against Worcestershire at Worcester and followed that with 121 in the match against Sussex at Taunton. In 1906, again at Worcester, he hit 163 and in that season he made 941 first-class runs, the nearest he got to 1000 in a season before the First World War.

Johnson's best season was 1908, when he topped the first-class averages for the English cricket season with 603 runs in eight innings. In fact, he played in only five matches that season, and one of those was so badly affected by rain that the Somerset side did not bat at all. In his first game, he made 164 and 131 against Middlesex at Taunton, the first time a Somerset cricketer had hit two centuries in a first-class match. The 164 in this match remained Johnson's highest-ever score. In the following match, against Hampshire he made 117 and 19. And then in his third match of the season, against Kent, he scored 31 and 126.

== International cricket ==
A year after his trip with Bosanquet to North America, Johnson was part of a private team that toured New Zealand and Australia under the leadership of Lord Hawke in the 1902–03 season. Four years later, in the 1906–07 season, he went back to New Zealand with a Marylebone Cricket Club (MCC) side composed of amateur players that played 11 first-class matches in a three-month period. These were his only experiences of international cricket, though Foot writes, in his history of Somerset cricket: "It's well known that he was invited to go to Australia with the Warner-Douglas team" of 1911–12. But, he adds, "he thought hard about it, tried in vain to revise his business schedules and said no to likely fame." He was selected to tour South Africa in 1913–14, but declined the invitation.

In Foot's view, "with more spare time," Johnson "would have walked into the England side – and adorned it with that touch of elegance inseparable from his tall, distinctive presence."

== Postwar cricket ==
Johnson served in the Middle East in the First World War where he was taken ill. He played little in 1919, but turned out in eight matches in 1920. Early in the 1921 season, he was picked as captain of the MCC side which played the all-conquering Australian team under Warwick Armstrong, which may have been an indication that he was being considered for the Test team, England having lost all five matches in the Ashes series the previous winter. In the event, he was unable to bat in the second innings of the match because of a "damaged hand". R. C. Robertson-Glasgow, in a brief profile of Johnson, wrote: "Whatever this captaincy may have foreshadowed, Johnson, having a bone in his hand broken by a very fierce one from J. M. Gregory, dropped out of cricket for some weeks." In fact, Johnson was available for Somerset's next match only a week after the MCC game, but the call to Test cricket never came. In the season as a whole, he passed 1,000 runs for the only time in his career but Wisden noted that he was "brilliant rather than consistent".

Over the next few seasons, Johnson played regular county cricket for Somerset, averaging, after a poor 1922, in the 20s, and making a lot of catches in the slips. As late as 1926, when he was nearly 46 years of age, he was sharing in a last-wicket partnership of 139 in 95 minutes with Robertson-Glasgow against Surrey at The Oval, making an unbeaten 117 himself. But that was the last of his 18 centuries and after a few matches in 1927, he retired.

After retirement, he was afflicted by arthritis and in his latter years was used a wheelchair. He died at Sidmouth, Devon on 1 July 1959.

== Style and personality ==
Robertson-Glasgow, as a young amateur coming into the Somerset side in the 1920s, was clearly in awe of Johnson and left a portrait of a cricketer of considerable panache. "P.R. Johnson's fame rests on batting comparable in style and fluency to that of Lionel Palairet," he wrote – Palairet was noted as a stylish batsman in the so-called "Golden Age" of late Victorian and Edwardian cricket. He added: "Tall and graceful, Randall Johnson in play against fast bowling is something to remember; and once, when he was bowled in the thirties, I heard an opponent, not fond of words or losing, remark: 'Well, I am sorry; that's the best of the day gone.'"

David Foot, confessing himself influenced by Robertson-Glasgow's description, wrote: "Johnson was the kind of batsman whose cover drive caused opposing fielders to stop and applaud before returning the ball."
