= Lionel Gough Arbuthnot =

English cricketer

Lionel Arbuthnot
Personal information
- Full name: Lionel Gough Arbuthnot
- Born: 29 September 1867; Kensington, England
- Died: 16 May 1942 (aged 74); Surrey, England
- Batting: Unknown
- Role: Tail-end batsman

Domestic team information
- Years: Team
- 1901–02: R. A. Bennett's XI
- First-class debut: 22 January 1902 R. A. Bennett's XI v Barbados
- Last First-class: 10 April 1902 R. A. Bennett's XI v British Guiana

Career statistics
Competition	FC
Matches	7
Runs scored	44
Batting average	8.80
100s/50s	-/-
Top score	17*
Balls bowled	–
Wickets	–
Bowling average	–
5 wickets in innings	–
10 wickets in match	–
Best bowling	–
Catches/stumpings	2/–
- Source: CricketArchive, 18 February 2010

Major Lionel Gough Arbuthnot, MBE was a banker and soldier who also played first-class cricket on a tour of the West Indies in 1901–02.

== Cricket career ==
Arbuthnot was not part of the official touring party which had just 11 players, but appeared in seven of the 13 first-class matches, including two of the games against teams representing the combined West Indies. He batted at No 11 in all but one of his seven games and he did not bowl.

His best match, and that of the whole team, was the second of the "international" fixtures he played in against the West Indies at Georgetown, Guyana, when he made his top score of 17 not out and shared in a 10th wicket partnership of 43 with wicketkeeper Arthur Whatman, who was captaining the side in Bennett's absence. The touring team won the match by an innings and 330 runs.

== Military career ==
Captain, Lancashire Fusiliers; MBE 3 June 1919; Temp Lt Lanc Fus transferred to General List ADC 10 Jun 1918. Temp Major Labour Corps to be temp Lt-Col while employed as Army Burial Officer 23 Dec 1918. He relinquished his commission (temp Capt, ADC personal staff, general list) and was appointed temp Lt 23 Jan 1919. He relinquished his commission (temp Major, Capt ret'd pay) and retains the rank of Major 20 Jun 1919. He relinquished his commission (temp Lt, 4th Bn Sussex Reg't) 5 July 1921. Brigadier-General, Royal Fusiliers, Order of the White Eagle (Serbia) 5th class.
