= Sam Hargreave =

English cricketer (1875–1929)

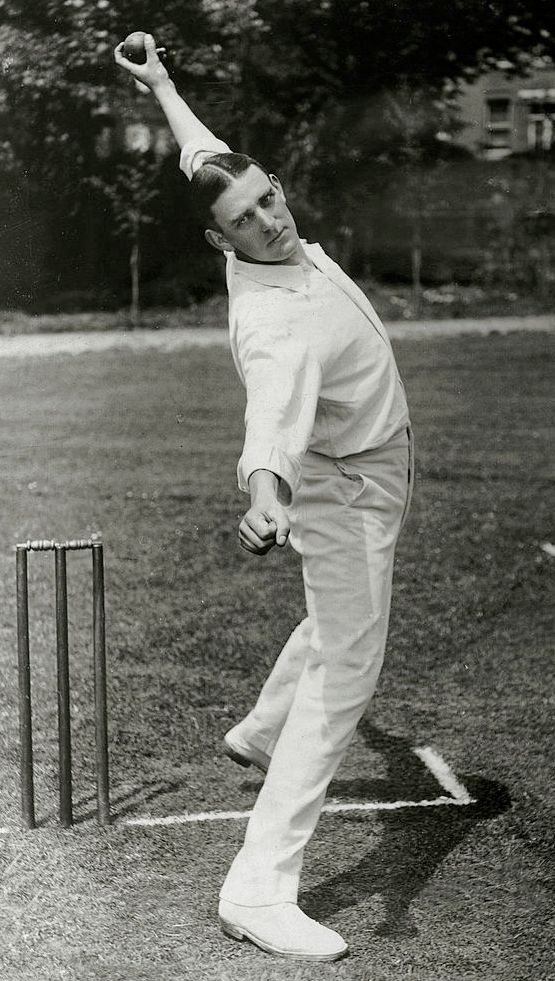

Personal information
- Born: 22 September 1875; Rusholme, Lancashire, England
- Died: 1 January 1929 (aged 53); Stratford-upon-Avon, Warwickshire, England
- Batting: Left-handed
- Bowling: Slow left arm orthodox

Career statistics
Competition	First-class
Matches	206
Runs scored	1,932
Batting average	9.66
100s/50s	0/0
Top score	45
Balls bowled	52,368
Wickets	919
Bowling average	21.84
5 wickets in innings	74
10 wickets in match	18
Best bowling	9/35
Catches/stumpings	156/0
- Source: CricketArchive, 9 May 2022

Sam Hargreave (22 September 1875 – 1 January 1929) was the most successful bowler for Warwickshire until the success of Foster and Field in winning the 1911 County Championship.

Although the presence of Wilfred Rhodes and Colin Blythe made higher representative honours always out of his reach, for a couple of years in the early 1900s Hargreave was regarded as the best left arm slow bowler in England apart from Rhodes. His accuracy was always exceptional and on helpful pitches he could spin the ball a great deal. Being faster than Rhodes or Blythe, Hargreave was very difficult to hit and his steadiness made him valuable on the generally very plumb wickets that characterised Edgbaston in fine weather during that era. Hargreave was no batsman, but he was a capable fieldsman at point or slip.

== Career ==
Sam Hargreave played for Lancashire's second eleven in the middle 1890s, but having no opportunity with Briggs so dominant he left Lancashire to join the Edgbaston ground staff and qualify for Warwickshire. He became qualified for Warwickshire near the end of 1899, but playing in two matches did nothing apart from a surprise 44 against Lockwood at his most destructive, which was to remain his second-highest score in first-class cricket. However, he rose very quickly to a permanent place in 1900, and in the following year, in a summer all against bowlers especially on so good a ground as Edgbaston provided in fine weather, Hargreave bowled so well under all conditions that he was in the top ten of the first-class averages. On a helpful pitch Hargreave already showed how difficult he could be with such performances as seven for 50 at Worcester and fourteen for 115 against London County, but he bowled beautifully under all conditions.

In the following two seasons, almost continuously helped by the condition of the pitches, Hargreave went from strength to strength except when mastered completely on perfect pitches against Derbyshire and Surrey in August 1902. Hargreave's form had him selected alongside George Thompson as one of two professionals on a tour to New Zealand under Lord Hawke where he would be somewhat disappointing, in addition to being utterly ineffective owing to his wholly mechanical style in three matches played in Australia. Hargreave gained revenge for Surrey's mastering of his bowling in 1903 on a sticky Oval pitch, when in the best-known and biggest feat of his career he took fifteen for 76 after being initially left out as he was returning home with Thompson, Bernard Bosanquet, and Toddles Dowson on the Oroya ship and then overland from Paris. Because the first day was blank Hargreave could take his place in the Warwickshire team, and during that season every Warwickshire victory was produced by Hargreave's deadly bowling on rain affected pitches:

- v Surrey at The Oval: six for 41 and nine for 35
  - TOTAL 15 wickets for 76 runs
- v Leicestershire at Edgbaston: six for 30 and six for 49
  - TOTAL 12 wickets for 79 runs
- v Essex at Edgbaston: five for 51 and six for 29
  - TOTAL 11 wickets for 80 runs
- v Gloucestershire at Bristol: five for 71 and three for 40
  - TOTAL eight wickets for 111 runs
- v Hampshire at Edgbaston: five for 65 and seven for 48
  - TOTAL 12 wickets for 113 runs
- GRAND TOTAL for five wins: 58 wickets for 461 runs, average 7.95

Heading the County Championship bowling averages (at least among those who bowled a reasonable number of overs) and taking more first-class wickets than anybody except Rhodes, Blythe and Ted Arnold, Hargreave would ordinarily have been chosen as a Cricketer of the Year by Wisden, but the choices of Blythe, John Gunn and Walter Mead left no room for a fourth finger-spin bowler.

It had always been thought Hargreave's relatively slight frame could not cope with the heavy workload he had to carry on hard wickets, and questions re-emerged when in the dry summer of 1904 he was quite out of form, taking only half as many wickets as in 1903 at over twice the cost. However, for the two following seasons he defied his critics with tenacity and patience on generally very easy pitches: doing, in the continued absence of Field, a great deal of work on unhelpful pitches, he remained one of the best left-arm spinners in the business. This work, however, took its toll in 1907 when the wickets should have allowed him as good an average as 1903, but Hargreave suffered a strain and could no longer spin the ball. He averaged as high as 22 runs a wicket for little more than half as many victims as in 1903. Shoulder troubles kept Hargreave out of the team for the second half of 1908 and an appalling record of over 30 runs per wicket in the wet summer of 1909 showed Hargreave as completely past it. Warwickshire offered him a contract for 1910, but Hargreave could not accept the terms thereof.

Always affected by ill-health for the rest of his life, Sam Hargreave died, largely unnoticed, on the first day of 1929. At the time of his death, Hargreave still was the third-highest wicket-taker for Warwickshire behind Field and Howell. Among spin bowlers, only Paine and Hollies have exceeded his tally.
