= Hollins (surname) =

Hollins is a surname. Notable people with the surname include:

- Alexander Hollins (born 1996), American football player
- Alfred Hollins (1865–1942), British composer and organist
- Andre Hollins (born 1992), American basketball player
- Arthur Hollins (footballer), English footballer
- Arthur Hollins (politician) (1876–1962), English Member of Parliament
- Austin Hollins (born 1991), American basketball player in the Israeli Basketball Premier League
- Chris Hollins (born 1971), BBC sports presenter
- Damon Hollins (born 1974), American former Major League Baseball player
- Dave Hollins (born 1966), American former Major League Baseball player
- Dave Hollins (footballer) (born 1938), Welsh former football goalkeeper
- David Hollins (born 1951), former Australian rules footballer
- Ellis Hollins (born 1999), English child actor
- Frank Hollins (1877–1963), English cricketer
- Harry Hollins (1932–1989), American politician
- H. B. Hollins (1854–1938), American financier, banker and railroad magnate
- Hue Hollins (1940–2013), former National Basketball Association referee
- Jessie Hollins (1970–2009), American baseball player
- John Hollins (1946–2023), English retired football player and coach
- John Hollins (artist) (1798–1855), English portrait painter
- John Hollins (cricketer) (1890–1938), English cricketer
- Justin Hollins (born 1996), American football player
- Laura Hollins (born 1983), birth name of Agyness Deyn, English fashion model, actress and singer
- Leslie Hollins (1897–1984), Australian politician
- Lionel Hollins (born 1953), American National Basketball Association former player and head coach
- Mack Hollins (born 1993), American football player
- Marion Hollins (1892–1944), American amateur golfer and golf course developer, daughter of H. B. Hollins
- Peter Hollins (1800–1886), English sculptor
- Ralph Hollins (1931–2021), American naturalist
- Ryan Hollins (born 1984), American basketball player
- Sandra Hollins, American politician elected to the Utah State House of Representatives in 2014
- Sheila Hollins, Baroness Hollins (born 1946), British professor of psychiatry
- Tony Hollins (1909–1957), American blues musician
- Tyree Hollins (born 1990), American football player

Fictional characters:

- Dave Hollins: Space Cadet, from the BBC Radio 4 series Son of Cliché
- Imogen Hollins, from the BBC soap opera Doctors
- Jack Hollins, from the BBC soap opera Doctors
- Karen Hollins, from the BBC soap opera Doctors
- Rob Hollins, from the BBC soap opera Doctors
