= Sir Arthur Hollins, 2nd Baronet =

English cricketer and football administrator

Personal information
- Full name: Arthur Meyrick Hollins
- Born: 16 July 1876; Preston, Lancashire, England
- Died: 30 July 1938 (aged 62); Walton-le-Dale, Lancashire, England
- Batting: Right-handed
- Bowling: Unknown
- Relatives: Frank Hollins (brother); John Hollins (brother)

Domestic team information
- Years: Team
- 1899–1900: Oxford University

Career statistics
Competition	First-class
Matches	12
Runs scored	389
Batting average	21.61
100s/50s	–/1
Top score	63
Balls bowled	403
Wickets	3
Bowling average	83.00
5 wickets in innings	–
10 wickets in match	–
Best bowling	1/19
Catches/stumpings	6/–
- Source: Cricinfo, 13 May 2020

Sir Arthur Meyrick Hollins, 2nd Baronet (16 July 1876 – 30 July 1938) was an English first-class cricketer and football administrator.

The son of Sir Frank Hollins, he was born at Preston in July 1876. He was educated at Eton College, before going up to Hertford College, Oxford. While studying at Oxford, he played first-class cricket for Oxford University, making his debut against A. J. Webbe's XI at Oxford in 1899. He played first-class cricket for Oxford until 1900, making a total of ten appearances. He scored a total of 287 runs in his ten first-class matches for Oxford, at an average of 19.13 and a high score of 63. During his time at Oxford, Hollins partook in other sporting events for the university, which included running the quarter mile race against Cambridge on three occasions.

He toured North America with Bernard Bosanquet's XI in September–October 1901, making two first-class appearances against the Gentlemen of Philadelphia, with Hollins scoring 102 runs in the first-class matches on the tour. Hollins later served in the First World War with the Loyal Regiment, with him holding the temporary rank of captain by May 1915. He resigned his commission in February 1918, at which point he was granted the honorary rank of captain. Hollins became the chairman of Preston North End in 1921 with his tenure lasting until 1938, with Preston winning the 1937–38 FA Cup in his final year as chairman. He succeeded his father as the 2nd Baronet of the Hollins baronets upon his death in 1924. Hollins served as the High Sheriff of Lancashire in 1928. Hollins died at Walton-le-Dale in July 1938, being succeeded upon his death as the 3rd Baronet by his brother, the cricketer Sir Frank Hubert Hollins. His youngest brother, John, was also a cricketer.

Baronetage of the United Kingdom
Preceded by Sir Frank Hollins	Baronet (of Greyfriars); 1924–1938	Succeeded by Sir Frank Hubert Hollins
