= Richard Blaker (cricketer, born 1821) =

English cricketer, barrister, military aviator and civil servant

Personal information
- Full name: Richard Nathaniel Blaker
- Born: 3 November 1821; Brighton, Sussex, England
- Died: 16 April 1894 (aged 72); Worthing, Sussex, England
- Relatives: Dick Blaker (grandson); Joan Smith (great-granddaughter); Barbara Hamilton (great-granddaughter)

Domestic team information
- Years: Team
- 1842–1843: Cambridge University

Career statistics
| Competition | First-class |
|---|---|
| Matches | 7 |
| Runs scored | 75 |
| Batting average | 3.88 |
| 100s/50s | 0/0 |
| Top score | 15 |
| Balls bowled | 130 |
| Wickets | 37 |
| Bowling average | ? |
| 5 wickets in innings | 4 |
| 10 wickets in match | 2 |
| Best bowling | 7/? |
| Catches/stumpings | 6/– |
- Source: Cricinfo, 4 October 2020

Richard Nathaniel Blaker (3 November 1821 – 16 April 1894) was an English first-class cricketer and clergyman.

The son of Harry Blaker, a surgeon, he was born at Brighton in November 1821. He was educated on the island of Guernsey at Elizabeth College, before going up to St John's College, Cambridge. While studying at Cambridge, Blaker played first-class cricket for Cambridge University in 1842 and 1843, making seven appearances. He scored 75 runs in these matches, with a high score of 15. It was as a bowler that Blaker had the greatest impact, taking 37 wickets and taking a five wicket haul on four occasions and ten wickets in a match twice. He gained a cricket blue while at Cambridge.

After graduating from Cambridge, Blaker took holy orders in the Church of England. His first ecclesiastical post was at Chichester, where he was a priest in 1845. He was a curate at Horsham from 1844 to 1847, before holding the same post at Rayne, Essex from 1847 to 1849. He returned to Sussex in 1850, taking up the post of vicar of Ifield. He held this post until his retirement in 1887, after which he retired to West Worthing where he died in April 1894. His grandson, Dick Blaker, later played first-class cricket, while his great-granddaughters Barbara Hamilton and Joan Smith were notable women cricketers.
