= Edward Dowson (cricketer, born 1838) =

English cricketer

Edward Dowson (17 February 1838 – 29 April 1922) was an English cricketer who played for Surrey between 1856 and 1870 as a gentleman cricketer. He also captained Surrey in 1866. A right-hand bat, he scored 1,927 runs at a batting average of 16.90. His son, Edward Maurice Dowson, played over one hundred matches for Surrey and also Cambridge University cricket team, and his great-great-grandson Ed Carpenter played briefly for Durham MCC University.
