= Charles Webb (English cricketer) =

English cricketer and Anglican clergyman

The Rev. Charles Johnston Bourne Webb (24 November 1874 – 18 November 1963) was an English cricketer and Anglican clergyman.

Webb was born in Bloemfontein, Orange Free State where his father Allan Webb, was the bishop. Charles attended Radley, where he played in the First XI from 1891 to 1893 and captained the team in 1893. After Radley he went up to Keble College, Oxford. He represented Middlesex as a right-handed batsman and a right-arm slow bowler in two matches in 1902. Later he played for Dorset.

His brother-in-law Richard Bennett played cricket for Hampshire and Marylebone Cricket Club (MCC). Charles's son Allan married the novelist Stella Gibbons. Charles died in St John's Wood, London, aged 88.
