= Arthur Lee (cricketer, born 1913) =

English barrister, judge, and cricketer

Personal information
- Full name: Arthur Michael Lee
- Born: 22 August 1913; Liphook, Hampshire, England
- Died: 14 January 1983 (aged 69); Midhurst, Sussex, England
- Batting: Right-handed
- Bowling: Slow left-arm orthodox
- Relatives: Edward Lee (father)

Domestic team information
- Years: Team
- 1933: Hampshire
- 1934–1935: Oxford University

Career statistics
Competition	First-class
Matches	4
Runs scored	64
Batting average	10.66
100s/50s	–/–
Top score	24
Catches/stumpings	1/–
- Source: Cricinfo, 17 January 2010

Arthur Michael Lee DSC QC DL (22 August 1913 — 14 January 1983) was an English barrister and judge who had a brief career as a first-class cricketer. He was known as Michael Lee in his legal career.

The son of the cricketer Edward Lee, he was born in August 1913 at Liphook. He was educated at Winchester College, where he played for the college cricket team and was captain in 1932; Wisden described him as "a useful bat and slow spinner" whilst at Winchester. From there, he matriculated to Brasenose College, Oxford. Whilst he did not play for Oxford University Cricket Club in his freshman year, he was invited for trials by Hampshire. He subsequently made a single appearance in first-class cricket for Hampshire against Somerset at Bath in the 1933 County Championship. In 1934, he made two first-class appearances for Oxford University against the Free Foresters and Minor Counties cricket team, before playing against Yorkshire in 1935. In his four first-class matches, he scored 64 runs with a highest score of 24.

Lee served during the Second World War with the Royal Naval Volunteer Reserve (RNVR), holding the rank of lieutenant in 1941. He was awarded the Distinguished Service Cross in November 1941, "for determination and skill in action against Enemy Submarines" while serving on HMS Wanderer. A member of the Middle Temple, following the war he became a barrister. He rose to become a judge in Hampshire, having been appointed by Elizabeth II in January 1962. According to an obituary in The Times contributed by Lord Denning, he was offered a position as a High Court judge, but turned it down. During his legal career, Lee maintained his association with the RNVR, in which he later held the rank of lieutenant commander. In April 1975, he was appointed a deputy lieutenant of Hampshire. Lee died in hospital at Midhurst on 14 January 1983.
