= Richard Johnson (cricketer, born 1829) =

English cricketer

Richard Cubitt Johnson (13 October 1829 – May 1851) was an English cricketer who played in two matches for Cambridge University that are now considered to have been first-class. He was born at Lavenham, Suffolk and died at Cambridge.

Johnson was the eldest son of the rector of Lavenham, also named Richard Johnson, and his wife, the former Mary Ann Cubitt. He was educated at Bury St Edmunds Grammar School and at Clare College, Cambridge. He was followed to Cambridge and into the cricket team there by his younger brother, George Randall Johnson – whose son, Peter Randall Johnson, took the same path 50 years later and was then a famous Somerset cricketer.

Johnson played cricket for Cambridge University in two matches, one each at home and away, against the Marylebone Cricket Club in 1850, batting as a middle-order batsman. It is not recorded whether he batted right-handed or left-handed and the scorecards for both matches are incomplete, and so it is not recorded that he bowled, but if he did, he took no wickets. His top score of 28 came in the match at Lord's.

Johnson died suddenly at Cambridge from typhoid fever while still an undergraduate; his close friend Edmund Keble White, who had been at school with him and was at Trinity College, Cambridge – their fathers had been fellows at Gonville and Caius College, Cambridge – also died in the same typhoid outbreak.
