= John Hollins (cricketer) =

English cricketer (1890–1938)

Personal information
- Full name: John Chard Humphrey Lancelot Hollins
- Born: 3 June 1890; Fulwood, Lancashire, England
- Died: 13 November 1938 (aged 48); Whittle-le-Woods, Lancashire, England
- Batting: Right-handed
- Bowling: Unknown
- Relatives: Arthur Hollins (brother); Frank Hollins (brother)

Domestic team information
- Years: Team
- 1914–1919: Lancashire
- First-class debut: 4 June 1914 v Nottinghamshire
- Last First-class: 8 August 1919 v Nottinghamshire

Career statistics
Competition	First-class
Matches	20
Runs scored	454
Batting average	15.13
100s/50s	0/1
Top score	65
Balls bowled	132
Wickets	1
Bowling average	99.00
5 wickets in innings	0
10 wickets in match	0
Best bowling	1/45
Catches/stumpings	10/–
- Source: ESPNcricinfo, 15 June 2023

John Chard Humphrey Lancelot Hollins (3 June 1890 – 13 November 1938) was an English cricketer. A right-handed batsman, he played 20 first-class matches for Lancashire between 1914 and 1919. He scored 454 runs with a highest score of 65 and held ten catches. He took one wicket with a best analysis of 1/45.

Hollins was born in Fulwood, an area of Preston, Lancashire, the son of Sir Frank Hollins. His elder brothers Arthur and Frank were also first-class cricketers. During the First World War, he served in the 4th Battalion, The Loyal Worth Lancashire Regiment. Hollins died in Whittle-le-Woods, Lancashire, on 13 November 1938, aged 48.
