= Edward Donner =

Banker

Sir Edward Donner, 1st Baronet (2 August 1840 – 29 December 1934), was a British banker, philanthropist and supporter of Liberal causes.

== Biography ==
Donner was the eldest son of Edward Sedgfield Donner, a solicitor, of Scarborough, Yorkshire, and his wife, Elizabeth. He was educated at the Royal Institution School in Liverpool and at Corpus Christi College, Oxford.

Donner was head of the shipping firm of Chamberlin, Donner & Co. and from 1904 chairman of the Manchester and Liverpool District Banking Society. He was one of the founders of the Manchester High School for Girls in 1874 and was a governor of the Victoria University of Manchester and of the Manchester Grammar School. He resided at Oak Mount, Fallowfield, and his firm's offices were in Aytoun Street, Manchester. Towards the end of his life he was known as the Grand Old Man of Manchester.

He was elected to the membership of Manchester Literary and Philosophical Society on 21 October 1884

In the late 1870s he organised an appeal for funds for the high school and in 1877 a new constitution was adopted which made the school a joint stock company instead of a voluntary association. Before this change Donner was personally responsible for the school finances and legally liable in case of a lawsuit. He was Lord of the Manor of Cayton.

He donated the Ashfield estate, now part of Platt Fields Park in Rusholme and Fallowfield, to the city of Manchester. Among his other benefactions were donations to the University, particularly to its Physical Laboratory, to the Manchester Grammar School, to the High School for Girls, where he was a governor for 61 years, from 1874 to 1934. It was said of him in 1892 that "the school [MHSG] owes more to him than to any living man", and on another occasion "he was incapable by temperament of anything but moderation and courtesy, whether on the platform or in private life, [and] he did much to sweeten and elevate the public life of the city".

Donner was also one of the leading supporters of the Liberal Party in Manchester. He entertained Sir Henry Campbell-Bannerman on the prime minister's visit to the city in 1907 and was created a baronet, of Oak Mount in the City of Manchester, later that year. In 1908 he was chairman of Winston Churchill's election campaign for Manchester North West (Churchill was defeated by William Joynson-Hicks).

Escutcheon of the Donner baronets of Oak Mount

Donner married Anna Maria Cunningham, elder daughter of William Cunningham, a banker, of Manchester, in 1866. Anna Maria, Lady Donner, was awarded the DBE for her work in organising the Fairview Auxiliary Hospital, Fallowfield. The couple had no children. Sir Edward Donner died in 1934, aged 94 and the title became extinct for lack of heirs.

Baronetage of the United Kingdom
New creation	Baronet (of Oak Mount); 1907–1934	Extinct
Preceded by Cory baronets	Donner baronets of Oak Mount; 28 November 1907	Succeeded by Hollins baronets
