= Dick Blaker =

English sportsman (1879–1950)

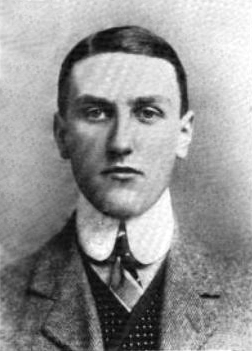
- In The Sketch, 13 February 1901

Personal information
- Full name: Richard Norman Rowsell Blaker
- Born: 24 October 1879; Bayswater, London
- Died: 11 November 1950 (aged 71); Eltham, London
- Batting: Right-handed
- Bowling: Right-arm fast
- Relatives: Richard Blaker (grandfather); Barbara Blaker (daughter); Joan Blaker (daughter)

Domestic team information
- Years: Team
- 1898–1908: Kent
- 1899–1902: Cambridge University
- 1901–1902: RA Bennett's XI

Career statistics
Competition	First-class
Matches	162
Runs scored	5,359
Batting average	22.61
100s/50s	2/25
Top score	122
Balls bowled	388
Wickets	9
Bowling average	25.11
5 wickets in innings	0
10 wickets in match	0
Best bowling	2/1
Catches/stumpings	142/–
- Source: CricInfo, 17 February 2016

Richard Norman Rowsell Blaker, MC (24 October 1879 – 11 September 1950) was an amateur sportsman who played first-class cricket for Kent County Cricket Club during the Golden Age of cricket prior to the First World War. Blaker won the Military Cross whilst serving as a lieutenant in the Rifle Regiment on the Western Front during the Great War.

== Early life ==
Blaker was born in Bayswater in London, the fourth child of solicitor Harry Blaker and his wife Edith Roswell. He attended Westminster School, where he was the captain of the cricket and football teams for four years. He played both sports for Cambridge University, where he attended Jesus College, between 1898 and 1902, gaining Blues in both sports and captaining the University football team in the 1901 varsity match.

Blaker's grandfather, also named Richard, had played first-class cricket for Cambridge in the 1840s. His father was also a cricketer, having played in minor matches for the Gentlemen of Sussex.

== First-class cricket career ==
Blaker made his first-class cricket debut in 1898, appearing for Kent against Middlesex at Lord's. He played only twice in 1898 before appearing five times each for Cambridge University and Kent in 1899. From 1900 he made more regular appearances and was awarded his county cap.

Blaker toured the West Indies with RA Bennett's XI in 1901–02, playing in all thirteen first-class matches on the tour. He played for Kent when they won the 1906 County Championship, the first title in the county's history, but 1907 was his final season playing regularly for the club as his professional career as a civil servant began. Blaker made a final appearance for Kent in the 1908 season, playing at the St Lawrence Ground against the touring Gentlemen of Philadelphia.

Wisden reports that he was an attacking batsman who scored quickly and a "fine slip fielder" whilst The Times considered him "a cricketer of adventure as well as talent". He had broken the Westminster School record for throwing a cricket ball 108 yards (99 m) in 1898 and could throw further than almost all his Kent contemporaries, although he generally fielded in what was considered an excellent Kent slip cordon. As a batsman he could score quickly, making 120 runs in 75 minutes against Gloucestershire at Catford in 1905 before going on to add 71 runs in a partnership with Arthur Day in only 15 minutes in the second innings.

Blaker captained Kent twice in 1905 and played once for Oxfordshire in the Minor Counties Championship and, after the First World War, for the Civil Service cricket team and for his local club, Blackheath. He was on the Kent Committee from 1946 to 1950 and President of the club in 1950, serving in the office when he died.

== Football career ==
Blaker was a centre forward who captained both his school team and Cambridge University. He played regularly for Corinthian F.C. in the early years of the 20th century.

== War service ==
Blaker served in the Royal West Kents and the Rifle Brigade during World War I. He enlisted under the Derby scheme in December 1915, aged 36, entering the Army Reserve as a private before being posted to the 10th Battalion of the Royal West Kents in March 1916. He was promoted first to lance corporal and then to lance sergeant before being admitted to Officer Cadet School in July 1916 at Gailes in Ayrshire. After training he was commissioned as a 2nd Lieutenant in the Rifle Brigade but immediately fell ill with pneumonia.

The illness kept Blaker in Britain until September 1918, when he was posted to France to join the 13th Battalion Rifle Brigade, having been promoted to lieutenant in May of the same year. He served on the front line in the final stages of the war, taking part in the crossing of the St Quentin Canal in the Hundred Days Offensive. His unit then took part in attacks around Louvignies near Cambrai on 4 November 1918, advancing across a railway line and into a series of defended positions in orchards. Blaker went ahead of his platoon and single-handedly captured two German machine-gun teams and a group of 30 other Germans. He won the Military Cross for his actions, "for most conspicuous courage and good work".

Blaker's unit moved into reserve following the attack, and he did not see more front-line service during the war. He was demobilised in February 1919 and resigned his commission in January 1920.

== Personal and professional life ==
Blaker joined the Civil Service in April 1908 as a clerk in the Chancery Registrar's office in the Law Courts, a move which brought his first-class cricket career with Kent to an end. In August of the same year, he married Mary Godby. The couple had three children. Their twin daughters, Joan and Barbara, were key figures in the development of the Kent Women cricket team; both were awarded posthumous county caps by Kent in 2020. Barbara was selected for the England Women's team to tour Australia in 1939/40, but the tour was cancelled after the outbreak of World War II.

By 1911 Blaker had risen to be principal clerk in the same office. After being demobilised from the army, he returned to his career, eventually rising to become principal clerk at the Supreme Court of Judicature. He played golf regularly, serving as Club Captain of the Royal Courts Golf Association in the 1920s, and was involved in the formation of the Civil Service Cricket Association during the same period. He died in September 1950 at Eltham Hospital following an operation for peritonitis, aged 71.

== Bibliography ==
- Carlaw, Derek (2020). Kent County Cricketers, A to Z: Part One (1806–1914) (PDF). Cardiff: ACS.
