= George Randall Johnson =

British cricketer and member of the New Zealand Legislative Council

George Randall Johnson (7 November 1833 – 24 November 1919) was a member of the New Zealand Legislative Council, and a notable cricket player in his younger days.

== Life ==
Johnson was the second son of the Reverend Richard Johnson, rector of Lavenham, Suffolk. His older brother was Richard Cubitt Johnson who played cricket for Cambridge in 1850 and died while an undergraduate of typhoid fever in 1851.

Johnson attended school in Bury St Edmunds and was admitted to Clare College, Cambridge in 1853, graduating with a B.A. in 1857 and an M.A. in 1861. He studied law at Lincoln's Inn and was called to the bar in 1861.

Like his brother, he played cricket for Cambridge University and was captain in 1855. He also played for Cambridge Town Club (a.k.a. Cambridgeshire) and for Marylebone Cricket Club (MCC).

At one time he was living in Stalham in Norfolk, and was a justice of the peace for Norfolk.

He lived for a time in New Zealand, in Poverty Bay, and was a member of the Legislative Council from 1872 to 1892. He was appointed on 23 July 1872 and served until 23 November 1892, when he resigned. He later returned to England and lived in Exeter.

He was the father of Peter Randall Johnson, who was born while he was living in New Zealand. He also had a daughter named Constance. He had a younger brother, James Woodbine Johnson, who also emigrated to New Zealand (in 1866) and died there in 1899.
