= Hollins baronets =

Extinct baronetcy in the Baronetage of the United Kingdom

Escutcheon of the Hollins baronets of Greyfriars

The Hollins baronetcy, of Greyfriars in the parish of Broughton in the County Palatine of Lancaster, now a suburb of Fulwood, was a title in the Baronetage of the United Kingdom. It was created on 29 November 1907 for Frank Hollins, head of Horrockses, Crewdson & Co., cotton spinners and manufacturers. The title became extinct on the death of the 3rd Baronet in 1963.

== Hollins baronets, of Greyfriars (1907) ==
- Sir Frank Hollins, 1st Baronet (1843–1924)
- Sir Arthur Meyrick Hollins, 2nd Baronet (1876–1938)
- Sir Frank Hubert Hollins, 3rd Baronet (1877–1963), who died leaving no heir.

Baronetage of the United Kingdom
Preceded by Donner baronets	Hollins baronets of Greyfriars; 29 November 1907	Succeeded by Leese baronets
