= Ed Carpenter (cricketer) =

English cricketer (born 1982)

Personal information
- Full name: Edward James Carpenter
- Born: 10 September 1982 (age 44); Hammersmith, London, England
- Nickname: Woody, Pieman
- Batting: Right-handed
- Bowling: Slow left-arm orthodox

Domestic team information
- Years: Team
- 2004: Durham UCCE

Career statistics
| Competition | First-class |
|---|---|
| Matches | 3 |
| Runs scored | 0 |
| Batting average | 0.00 |
| 100s/50s | –/– |
| Top score | 0* |
| Balls bowled | 319 |
| Wickets | 1 |
| Bowling average | 155.00 |
| 5 wickets in innings | – |
| 10 wickets in match | – |
| Best bowling | 1/47 |
| Catches/stumpings | 2/– |
- Source: Cricinfo, 21 August 2011

Edward James Carpenter (born 10 September 1982) is an English cricketer. Carpenter is a right-handed batsman who bowls slow left-arm orthodox. He was born in Hammersmith, London and educated at Marlborough College.

While studying for his degree at Durham University, Carpenter made his first-class debut for Durham UCCE against Durham in 2004. He made two further first-class appearances in 2004, against Northamptonshire and Derbyshire. In his three first-class matches, he failed to score any runs in four batting innings, With the ball, he took just a single wicket which came at an overall cost of 155.00.
