= Edward Dowson (cricketer, born 1880) =

English cricketer

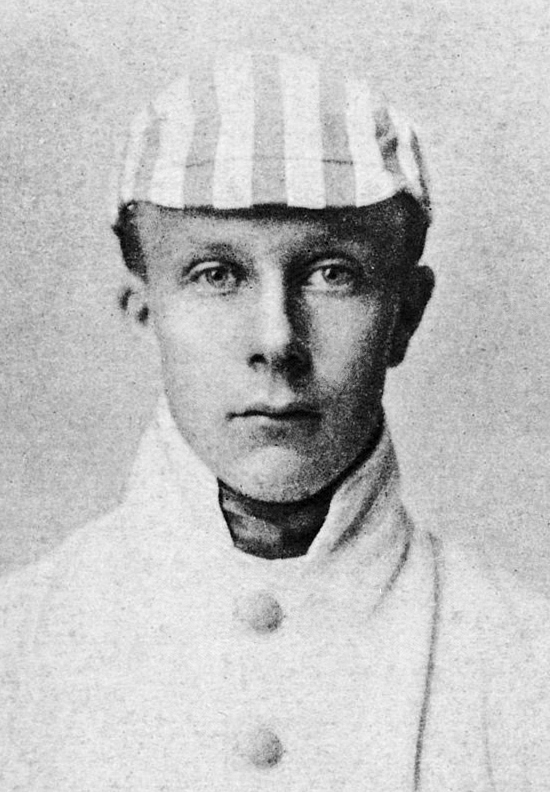

Personal information
- Full name: Edward Maurice Dowson
- Born: 21 June 1880; Weybridge, England
- Died: 22 July 1933 (aged 53); Hele House, Ashburton, Devon, England
- Batting: Right-handed
- Bowling: Slow left-arm orthodox

Domestic team information
- Years: Team
- 1900–1903: Cambridge University cricket team
- 1900–1903: Surrey County Cricket Club

Career statistics
Competition	First-class
Matches	113
Runs scored	5,047
Batting average	29.17
100s/50s	8/29
Top score	135
Balls bowled	8,549
Wickets	357
Bowling average	23.94
5 wickets in innings	23
10 wickets in match	3
Best bowling	8/21
Catches/stumpings	61/–
- Source: CricInfo, 27 April 2023

Edward Maurice Dowson (21 June 1880 – 22 July 1933) was an English cricketer for Cambridge University and Surrey. During a first-class cricket career which spanned from 1900 until 1913, he played 113 matches as an all rounder, scoring over 5,000 runs including eight centuries, as well as taking 357 wickets with slow left-arm orthodox spin bowling. He also played for the Marylebone Cricket Club, and toured overseas with various representative teams including Lord Hawke's tour of Australia and New Zealand in 1902–03. His father, also named Edward Dowson, also played for Surrey, and his great-grandson Ed Carpenter played briefly for Durham MCC University.

A successful all-rounder, Dowson scored over a thousand runs and 99 wickets in the 1901 season; a thousand runs and 76 wickets the following year, and another thousand runs and 42 wickets in 1903. He also took 80 wickets during a single tour of the West Indies in the winter of 1901–02.

His first-class career ended in 1903 with the final match of the 1903 County Championship, however Dowson was invited back by the Marylebone Cricket Club in 1913 to play his final first-class game when the MCC played Cambridge University at Lord's. Dowson was living at Hele House in Ashburton, Devon when he died aged 53.
