= Walter Pearce (New Zealand cricketer) =

New Zealand cricketer

Wally Pearce
Personal information
- Full name: Walter Charles Pearce
- Born: 29 April 1870; Christchurch, New Zealand
- Died: 20 March 1951 (aged 80); Christchurch, New Zealand
- Nickname: Biffer
- Batting: Right-handed
- Bowling: Right-arm fast-medium
- Role: All-rounder

Domestic team information
- Years: Team
- 1893–94 to 1902–03: Canterbury

Career statistics
Competition	First-class
Matches	14
Runs scored	468
Batting average	21.27
100s/50s	0/3
Top score	68
Balls bowled	2471
Wickets	59
Bowling average	12.79
5 wickets in innings	4
10 wickets in match	0
Best bowling	6/37
Catches/stumpings	11/–
- Source: Cricinfo, 7 April 2019

Walter Charles Pearce (29 April 1870 – 20 March 1951) was a New Zealand cricketer who played first-class cricket for Canterbury from 1894 to 1903 and represented New Zealand in the days before New Zealand played Test cricket.

Wally Pearce was a pace bowler who generated considerable pace from a short run-up and bowled an effective yorker, and a hard-hitting batsman with a crouching, ungainly style. He played an important part in New Zealand's first victory. In the match against the touring New South Wales team in 1895–96 he scored 47 in each innings, hitting out effectively after New Zealand were in trouble in the second innings, and took four wickets.

Pearce married Marion Wyatt in Christchurch on 21 December 1898. She died on 14 January 1943. They had two daughters. Pearce collapsed and died on his way home after watching a Test match at Lancaster Park in March 1951.
