= 1904 County Championship =

English cricket tournament

- Cricket format: First-class cricket (3 days)
- Tournament format: League system
- Champions: Lancashire (2nd title)
- Participants: 15
- Most runs: C. B. Fry (2,376 for Sussex)
- Most wickets: George Dennett (123 for Gloucestershire)

Location of the home ground of each county

The 1904 County Championship was the 15th officially organised running of the County Championship, and ran from 9 May to 5 September 1904. Lancashire won their second championship title, while six times champions Yorkshire finished in second place. The previous season's winners, Middlesex, finished in fourth place.

== Table ==
- One point was awarded for a win, and one point was taken away for each loss. Final placings were decided by dividing the number of points earned by the number of completed matches (i.e. those that ended in a win or a loss), and multiplying by 100.

Team	Pld	W	L	D	A	Pts	Fin	%Fin
Lancashire	26	16	0	10	0	16	16	100.00
Yorkshire	27	9	2	16	0	7	11	63.63
Kent	21	10	4	7	0	6	14	42.85
Middlesex	18	9	4	5	0	5	13	38.46
Nottinghamshire	20	7	4	9	0	3	11	27.27
Sussex	24	5	4	15	0	1	9	11.11
Leicestershire	20	6	6	8	0	0	12	0.00
Warwickshire	16	5	5	6	0	0	10	0.00
Gloucestershire	18	5	6	7	0	-1	11	–9.09
Derbyshire	18	5	8	5	0	-3	13	–23.07
Surrey	28	6	12	10	0	–6	18	–33.33
Somerset	18	5	11	2	0	–6	16	–37.50
Worcestershire	18	3	8	7	0	–5	11	–45.45
Essex	20	3	10	7	0	–7	13	–53.84
Hampshire	18	2	12	4	0	–10	14	–71.42

== Records ==
=== Batting ===
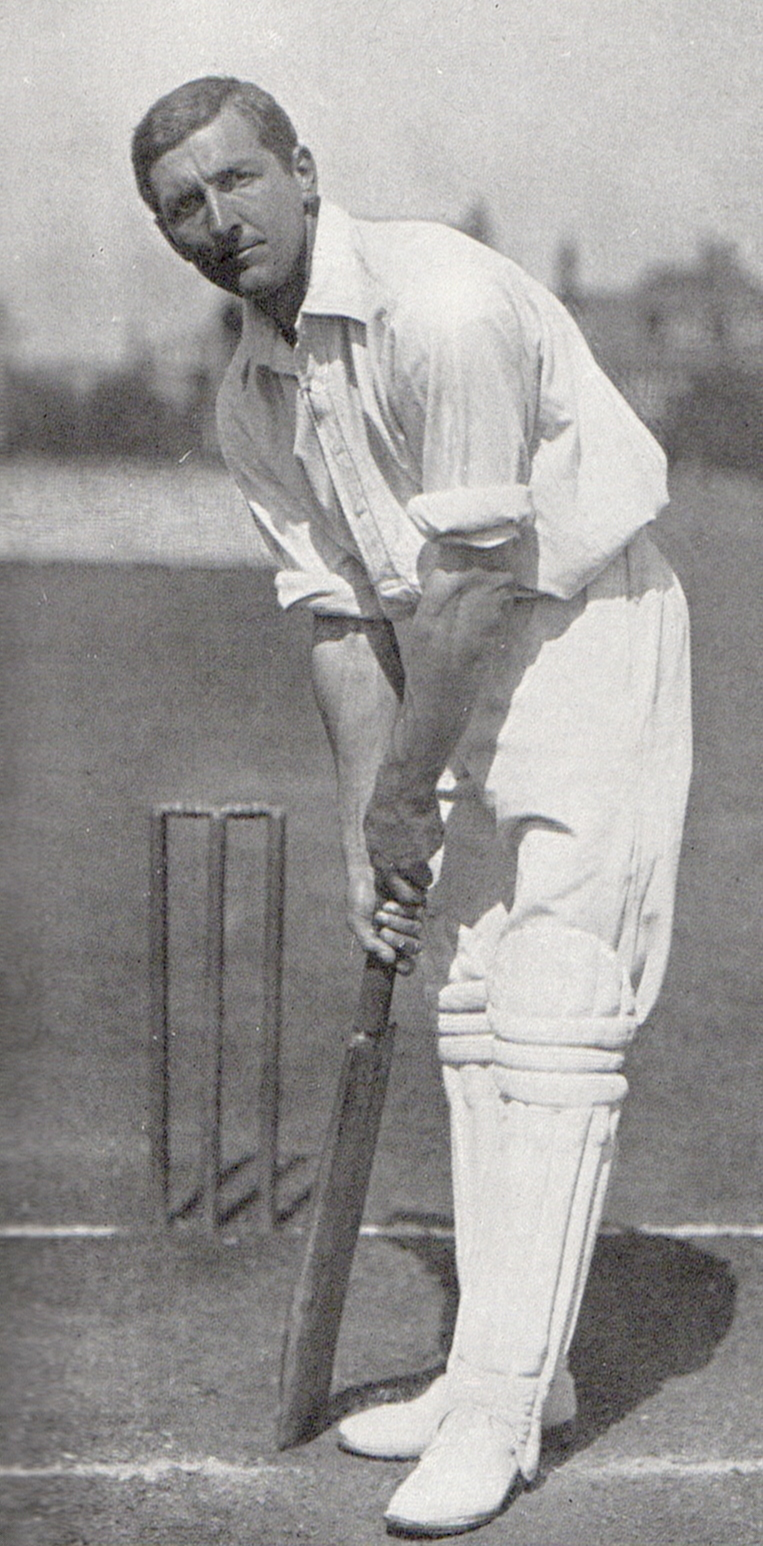
C. B. Fry was the leading run-scorer for the second successive season.

Most runs
Aggregate	Average	Player	County
2,376	79.20	C. B. Fry	Sussex
2,237	69.90	Johnny Tyldesley	Lancashire
2,074	50.58	Tom Hayward	Surrey
1,848	51.33	George Hirst	Yorkshire
1,812	60.40	James Iremonger	Nottinghamshire

=== Bowling ===
Most wickets
Aggregate	Average	Player	County
123	19.36	Edward Dennett	Gloucestershire
121	19.38	Charlie Blythe	Kent
112	23.50	George Cox	Sussex
108	18.71	James Hallows	Lancashire
106	26.16	Bill Reeves	Essex
