= Arthur Whatman =

English cricketer (1873–1965)

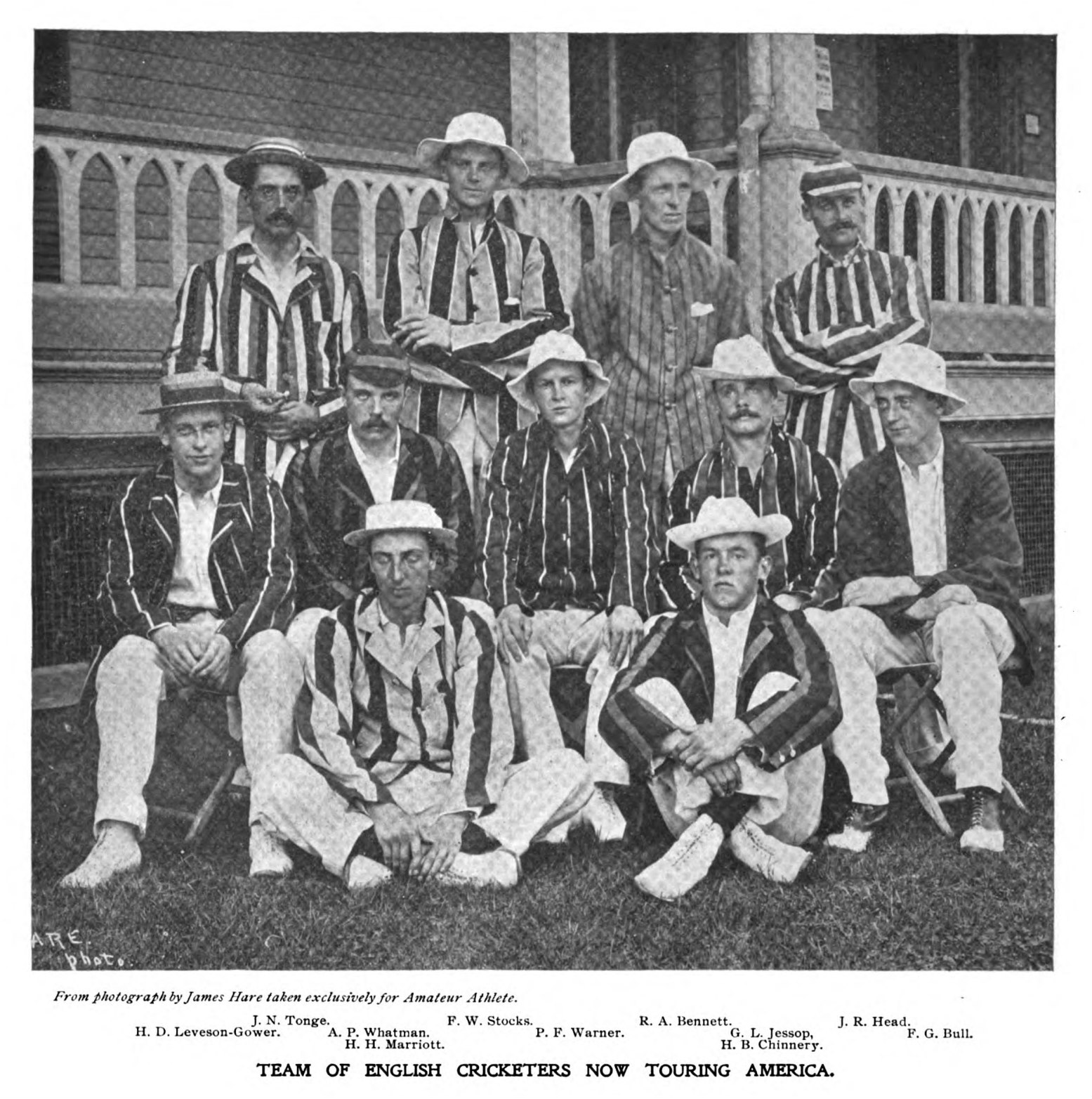
Whatman, second from left middle row, on North American tour in 1897.

Arthur Dunbar Whatman (13 February 1873 – 28 May 1965) was an English cricketer of the early twentieth century who played as a wicketkeeper for Suffolk County Cricket Club, a non-first-class team that is one of the minor counties of English cricket.

== Personal life ==
He was born in Westcott, Surrey in 1873, the only son of George Dunbar and his wife Frances Fuller, daughter of George Arthur Fuller. He was educated at Windlesham House School, Brighton (1883–87), Eton College, and Trinity Hall, Cambridge where he matriculated in 1892.

Whatman served for a year as a civilian aide-de-camp to General Clements in the Second Boer War, from December 1899. Afterwards he was an underwriter at Lloyd's of London and saw additional service in World War I as a captain in both the Suffolk Regiment and The Buffs.

Whatman died in Bury St Edmunds, Suffolk in 1965.

== Cricketer ==
Whatman's first-class experience came from representative team tours to New Zealand and the West Indies, in which he played twenty-six games, score 394 runs at a batting average of 14.07, taking 21 catches and executing nine stumpings. He had a prominent involvement in a dispute involving Bernard Bosanquet and a disagreement over an umpiring decision during a match against Canterbury during Lord Hawke's 1902-03 tour of New Zealand.

== Family ==
Whatman married in 1909 Marjory Isabel Knox Child, eldest daughter of Sir Coles Child, 1st Baronet.
