= Sir Frank Hollins, 3rd Baronet =

English cricketer

Sir Frank Hubert Hollins, 3rd Baronet (31 October 1877 – 31 January 1963) was an English cricketer active from 1898 to 1927 who played for Lancashire. He was born in Bowness-on-Windermere and died in Paddington. He appeared in 35 first-class matches as a righthanded batsman. He scored 1,114 runs with a highest score of 114 and held 33 catches. He took three wickets with a best analysis of two for 39.

Hollins was the second son of Sir Frank Hollins, 1st Baronet, who was head of the cotton spinning company of Horrockses, Crewdson & Co. He was educated at Eton and Magdalen College, Oxford. During World War I he served with the Rifle Brigade in France. He succeeded to the baronetcy in 1938 on the death of his brother, who had no children. He also had no children and the baronetcy became extinct on his death.

== Notes ==
Baronetage of the United Kingdom
Preceded by Arthur Meyrick Hollins	Baronet (of Greyfriars); 1938–1963	Extinct
