= Richard Bennett (English cricketer) =

English cricketer, businessman and soldier (1872–1953)

Personal information
- Full name: Richard Alexander Bennett
- Born: 12 December 1872; Holdenhurst, Hampshire, England
- Died: 16 July 1953 (aged 80); Thornbury, Gloucestershire, England
- Batting: Right-handed
- Role: Wicket-keeper

Domestic team information
- Years: Team
- 1896–1899: Hampshire
- 1899: Marylebone Cricket Club

Career statistics
Competition	First-class
Matches	37
Runs scored	683
Batting average	12.64
100s/50s	–/–
Top score	47
Catches/stumpings	44/29
- Source: Cricinfo, 25 January 2023

Richard Alexander Bennett (12 December 1872 — 16 July 1953) was an English first-class cricketer, who made 37 appearances in first-class cricket from 1896 to 1903. He led his own personal cricket team on a tour of the West Indies in early 1902, as well as playing county cricket for Hampshire. Militarily active, he served in the First World War with the Royal Gloucestershire Hussars.

== Early life and first-class cricket ==
The son of The Reverend Alexander Sykes Bennett, he was born in December 1892 at Holdenhurst, Hampshire. He was educated at Eton College, but did not feature in the college cricket team. From there, he matriculated in 1891 to Christ Church, Oxford. During his first year at Oxford, he was commissioned into the 4th Volunteer Battalion, Royal Hampshire Regiment as a second lieutenant in February 1892.

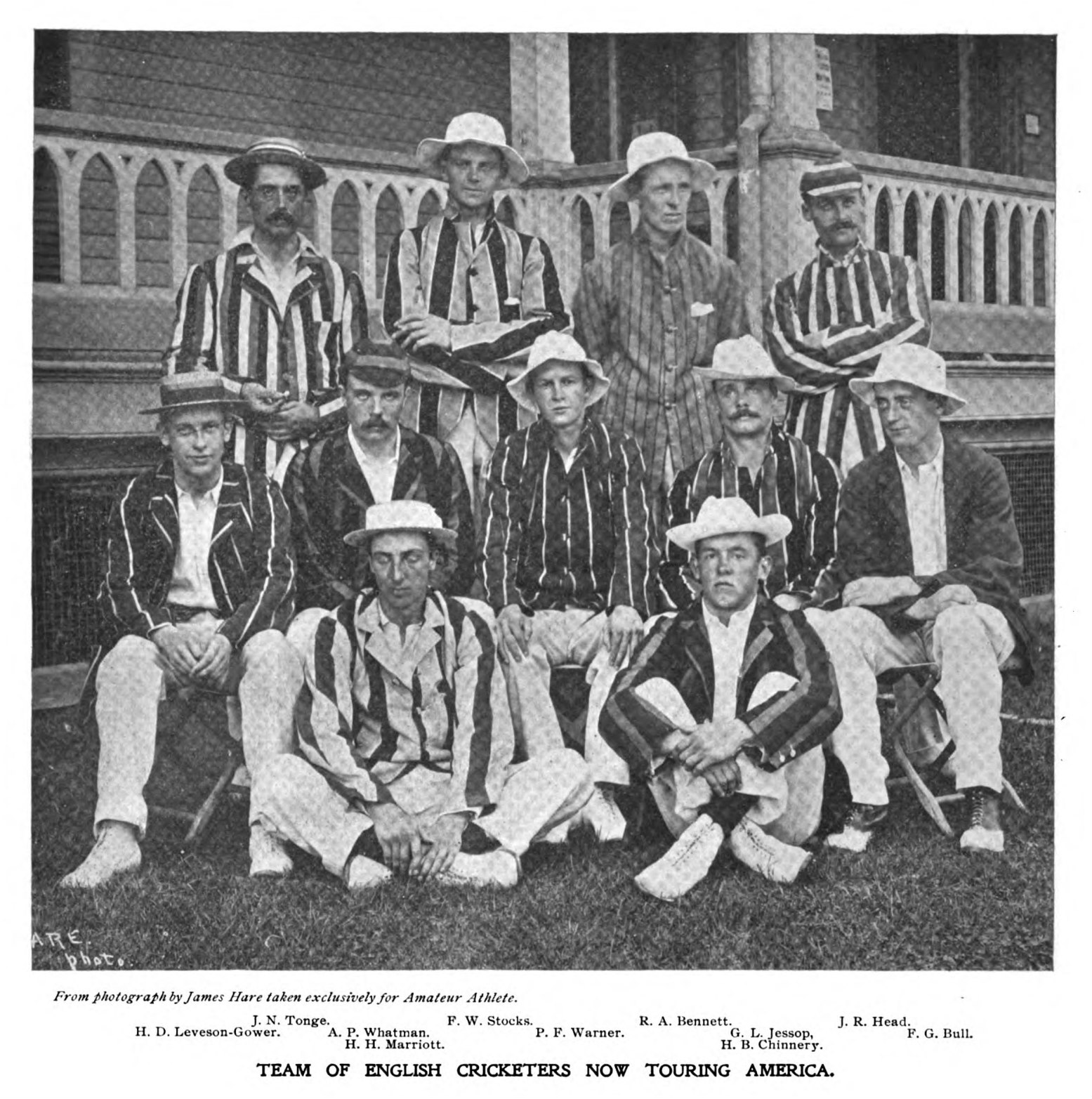
Bennett, second from right in back row, on the North American tour in 1897.

Playing his club cricket in Hampshire for the Hampshire Hogs, Bennett made his debut in first-class cricket for Hampshire against Leicestershire at Leicester in the 1896 County Championship. He played first-class cricket for Hampshire until 1899, making 23 appearances. Described by Wisden as a "steady bat and excellent wicket-keeper", he scored 468 runs for Hampshire at an average of 12.31, with a highest score of 47, which was to be his top score in first-class cricket; as a wicket-keeper, he took 22 catches and made six stumpings. In his final season with Hampshire, Bennett also made a single appearance for the Marylebone Cricket Club against Oxford University at Lord's.

Bennett twice toured aboard to play first-class cricket. His first tour, in 1897, saw him tour North America with Pelham Warner's personal team, making two first-class appearances during the tour against the Gentlemen of Philadelphia. His second tour abroad came after the end of his career with Hampshire, when he captained his own team on a tour to the West Indies in early 1902; originally the team, made up entirely of amateurs, was to be organised and captained by H. D. G. Leveson-Gower, but he was unable to tour. Making ten first-class appearances on the tour, he scored 141 runs with a highest score of 32 not out, while as wicket-keeper he took 15 catches and made 17 stumpings. Following the tour, Bennett made a final appearance in first-class cricket for the Gentlemen of England against Oxford University at Oxford in 1903. His overall first-class career saw Bennett play 37 matches, scoring 683 runs at an average of 12.64, while as a wicket-keeper he took 44 catches and made 29 stumpings.

== WWI service and later life ==
Outside of cricket, Bennett was in business and was the company secretary for the Bristol Sugar Refinery Co. His business commitments necessitated his relocation to Thornbury, some 12 miles (19 km) north of Bristol. There he played for Thornbury Castle Cricket Club from 1910, and continued to do so after the club amalgamated with Thornbury Cricket Club. During the First World War, he served in the Royal Gloucestershire Hussars, being appointed as a lieutenant in September 1914. He was made a temporary captain in November 1915. Following the war, he returned to club cricket as chairman of Thornbury Cricket Club and later served as its president from 1948 until his death, at Thornbury in July 1953. He was the brother-in-law of the cricketers Arthur Stafford Crawley and Charles Webb.
