= Charles Morrison (cricketer) =

West Indian cricketer

Charles Morrison in 1906

Charles Stuart Morrison (27 May 1883 in Jamaica – 25 November 1948 in Kingston, Jamaica) was a West Indian cricketer who toured with the second West Indian touring side to England in 1906. He was a right-handed batsman and a slow medium bowler.

He made his debut in important cricket for Jamaica against Lord Brackley's team in 1904-05 and was even chosen for the combined West Indies team for the match in Trinidad. He also played for the Jamaican side that played in Trinidad in August 1905. Jamaica performed badly but Morrison himself performed creditably and was selected as one of the two Jamaican for the forthcoming tour of England.

Before the tour he was described thus: "Considered a good bowler, and is a likely all-rounder". He was a disappointment on this 1906 tour averaging just 6.5 with the bat and taking just 14 wickets at an average of 14.5 in the first class matches. He did in fact have some success in a couple of early minor matches taking 8-101 in the match against Lord Brackley's West Indian XI and 5 more wickets in the next match against the Minor Counties XI. Thereafter he played irregularly and was only lightly bowled.

He played against the Philadelphian team that played in Jamaica in 1908-09, taking 11 wickets in the first of the three matches. He also played for Jamaica in their three matches against the 1910-11 English tourists. In 1913 'Cricket', referring to Jamaican cricket, recorded that "Probably C.S. Morrison is the best bowler the side ever had".

Remarkably he also played against the English tourists that played in the West Indies in 1925-26, when he captained Jamaica in their first two matches at the age 42. There had been no first class cricket played in Jamaica between these two tours.
