= Hoggarth =

Hoggarth is a surname. Notable people with the surname include:

- Ann Hoggarth (born c. 1950), Canadian politician
- Francis Hoggarth (1876–1961), Scottish cricketer
- Ron Hoggarth (born 1948), Canadian ice hockey official

== See also ==
- Hogarth (disambiguation)
