= International cricket in 1904–05 =

International cricket season

The 1904–05 international cricket season was from September 1904 to April 1905.

== Season overview ==
International tours
Start date	Home team	Away team	Results [Matches]			
Start date	Home team	Away team	Test	ODI	FC	LA
6 February 1905	West Indies	England	—	—	0–2 [2]	—
10 March 1905	New Zealand	Australia	—	—	0–1 [2]	—
28 March 1905	Fiji	Australia	—	—	0–0 [1]	—

== February ==
=== England in the West Indies ===
First-class Series
No.	Date	Home captain	Away captain	Venue	Result
Match 1	6–8 February	Harold Austin	Lord Brackley	Kensington Oval, Bridgetown	Brackley's XI by an innings and 17 runs
Match 2	31 Mar–4 April	Bertie Harragin	Lord Brackley	Queen's Park Oval, Port of Spain	Brackley's XI by 4 runs

== March ==
=== Australia in New Zealand ===
First-class series
No.	Date	Home captain	Away captain	Venue	Result
Match 1	10–13 March	Arthur Sims	Monty Noble	AMI Stadium, Christchurch	Match drawn
Match 2	16–18 March	Arthur Sims	Monty Noble	Basin Reserve, Wellington	Australia by an innings and 358 runs

=== Australia in Fiji ===
First-class match
No.	Date	Home captain	Away captain	Venue	Result
Match	10–13 March	HM Scott	Monty Noble	Albert Park, Suva	Match drawn
