= Richard Ollivierre =

West Indian cricketer

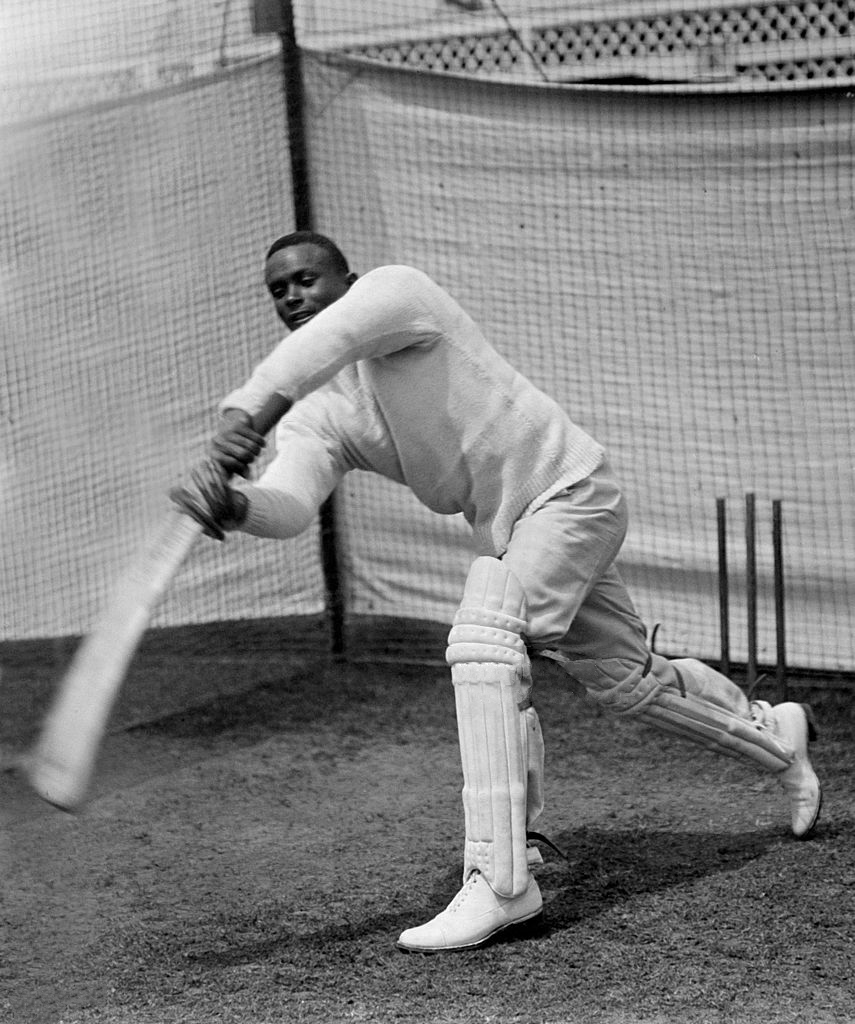

Personal information
- Born: 1880; Kingstown, St Vincent
- Died: 5 June 1937 (aged 57); New York City, U.S.
- Batting: Right-handed
- Bowling: Right-arm fast
- Relatives: Charles Ollivierre (brother) Helon Ollivierre (brother)

Career statistics
Competition	First-class
Matches	25
Runs scored	878
Batting average	17.91
100s/50s	0/4
Top score	67
Balls bowled	3407
Wickets	88
Bowling average	21.21
5 wickets in innings	4
10 wickets in match	1
Best bowling	7/23
Catches/stumpings	22/2
- Source: Cricinfo, 4 April 2020

Richard Cordice Ollivierre (1880 – 5 June 1937) was a black West Indian cricketer who toured England in 1906. He was a right-handed batsman, right-arm fast bowler and useful wicket-keeper.

== Life and career ==
Being from the small island of St Vincent, Ollivierre's chances to play in important cricket matches in the West Indies were limited. He made his debut in big matches playing with A. B. St Hill's team that played in Trinidad in 1898–99 scoring 60 in the second game, but was not selected for the 1900 tour to England. He played again in the next tour to Trinidad by A. B. St Hill's team in 1900–01, and in 1904–05 he was selected for the combined West Indies team and played in both matches against Lord Brackley's team.

He was chosen for the 1906 tour to England. Before the tour he was described as "an excellent bat, fine field; requires experience in first-class matches" and "he is one of the famous brotherhood and a hard hitter. He is quite the Jessop of the Indies, but combines the penchant of A. N. Hornby for short runs. Being the reserve wicketkeeper and a capital fast bowler, he is a good all-round exponent". He and Sydney Smith were the successes of the tour. He scored 480 in his 12 first class matches at an average of 20, led the bowling averages with 58 wickets at an average of 21.56, and even kept wicket on a few occasions. The highlight of his tour was the match against Yorkshire when he took 11 wickets in the West Indies victory.

He played for W. C. Shepherd's team that played in British Guiana and Trinidad in 1909–10 and had some success with his bowling. He did not play against the M.C.C. tourists in 1910–11 but did play for the combined West Indies in all three matches against the 1912–13 team and took 13 wickets in the matches and scored over 100 runs in the third match alone. Talking about the Cork Challenge Cup in the 1911–12 season 'Cricket' says that "The third tournament, in St. Vincent last year, came to a premature end, owing to the misbehaviour of the crowd, incensed at seeing its idol, Richard Ollivierre, given out l.b.w."

Soon after his 1912–13 success he emigrated to the United States and in August 1913 appeared for a 'West Indian Coloured Team' against the 1913 Australian tourists at Celtic Park, Brooklyn, New York City. Having recently played at a good standard he was clearly the best bowler in the side and took 7–57 in 19 overs, six of them bowled and the other caught and bowled. The West Indians were dismissed for 13 and 61 and beaten by an innings and 139 runs.

He was one of a family of cricketers which included his brothers Charles and Helon.
