= Archie Cumberbatch =

West Indian cricketer

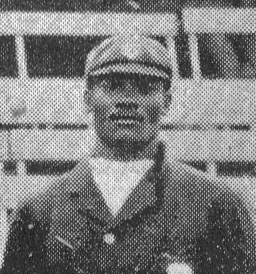
Archie Cumberbatch in 1906

Archibald Belford Cumberbatch (born 1 June 1879; death details unknown) was a West Indian cricketer who toured England in 1906. He was a right arm fast bowler.

Although raised in Barbados he found few opportunities there and moved to Trinidad in 1896 to serve as groundsman to Queen's Park Cricket Club in Port-of-Spain. In 1896–97 he played for Trinidad against both Lord Hawke's team and Priestley's team, playing for the combined West Indies side and taking an incredible 45 wickets in the 5 matches. Even in Trinidad being a Professional limited his opportunities to play in important matches, the Inter-Colonial Tournament being restricted to Amateurs only.

He returned to Barbados briefly in 1899 before moving to Jamaica to play for the Lucas Cricket Club in Kingston. Returning again to Barbados in 1900 he played for Fenwicks Cricket Club and then moved back to Trinidad in 1901 to play for Stingo Cricket Club. Despite his impressive form, he was not selected for the 1900 tour to England.

His next important matches were against Lord Brackley's team in 1904–05. In the first Trinidad match he took 13 wickets and was then selected for the combined West Indies team. He took 4 wickets in this match and then a further 7 in the second Trinidad game to complete an impressive two weeks cricket.

He then played in all 4 matches for the Trinidad when they toured Jamaica in 1905–06. He was again impressive taking 31 wickets and then finishing off with 127* in the final match.

He was selected for the second West Indies touring side that toured England in 1906. In 12 first class matches he scored 223 at an average of 11.73 and took 24 wickets at an average of 29.95. Before the 1906 tour he was described as "one of the best professional bowlers in the West Indies (fast over-arm). Is a native of Barbados" and "a professional who may be looked on as the mainstay of the attack. He bowls fast right arm, with an off break, the balls rising very sharply with the pitch. He has a good defence and is a safe field". He turned out to be a disappointment on the tour, his wickets being expensive. He did score a rapid 59* in 65 minutes against the M.C.C. but never took five wickets in an innings.

Back in the West Indies he played in William Shepherd's team in one of their matches Trinidad in 1909–10 but this was his only first class match after the 1906 tour.

During the 1906 tour he was invariably reported as being "C. P. Cumberbatch", but C. P. Cumberbatch was a different player. It was only in 2000 that much of the confusion concerning these two men was resolved by Ray Goble and Keith Sandiford.
