= John Joseph Cameron =

West Indian cricketer

John Joseph Cameron (28 May 1882 in Kingston, Jamaica – 12 December 1954 in Kingston, Jamaica) was a West Indian cricketer who toured with the second West Indian touring side to England in 1906. A Doctor, he was a right-handed batsman and a slow right arm bowler.

He hadn't played a single first class cricket match before being selected for the 1906 tour to England although he had played for Canada against the U.S.A. in Toronto in 1905. Before the tour started he was described as "a useful all-round cricketer" and "a student at the University of Edinburgh and a fine field at cover point; a useful change bowled and sound bat". He was a complete disappointment on the tour. In his 5 first class matches he scored just 33 runs and bowled only 3 overs. His only innings of any size was 28 against South Wales in a minor match.

In England in 1907 and 1908 he played a single first class match each season, taking 5-83 for the Gentlemen of England against Surrey in the 1908 match. He played against the Philadelphian team that played in Jamaica in 1908-09 with a little success.

After a long gap he played in three further first class matches for Jamaica, two against Barbados in 1924-25 and finally one against LH Tennyson's team in 1927-28, scoring 52, the only half century of his first class career.

His brother-in-law Edward Hull played for Jamaica, while his sons John Cameron and Jimmy Cameron played for Jamaica and in Test Cricket for the West Indies.
