= Challenor (surname) =

Challenor is a surname. Notable people with the surname include:

- Aimee Challenor (born 1997), British politician and transgender activist
- Edward Challenor (1873–1935), British Army officer and cricketer
- George Challenor (1888–1947), West Indian cricketer
- Harold Challenor (1922–2008), police officer
- Herschelle Sullivan Challenor (born 1938), foreign policy expert, international civil servant, university administrator, and activist
- Jenna Challenor (born 1981), South African long-distance runner
- Tracey Challenor, journalist, media consultant, news presenter, and reporter
