= Francis Hoggarth =

English-born Scottish cricketer

Personal information
- Full name: Francis Harry Hoggarth
- Born: 17 October 1876; Whitby, Yorkshire, England
- Died: 7 January 1961 (aged 84); Aberdeen, Aberdeenshire, Scotland
- Batting: Unknown

Domestic team information
- Years: Team
- 1906: Scotland

Career statistics
| Competition | First-class |
|---|---|
| Matches | 1 |
| Runs scored | 38 |
| Batting average | 19.00 |
| 100s/50s | –/– |
| Top score | 22 |
| Catches/stumpings | –/– |
- Source: Cricinfo, 2 November 2022

Francis Harry Hoggarth (17 October 1876 – 7 January 1961) was a Scottish first-class cricketer and schoolmaster.

Hoggarth was born in October 1876 at Whitby, Yorkshire. A schoolmaster by profession, he began his teaching as an assistant master in Whitby at the Church Street Boys School in 1896. He later taught in Scotland, holding a teaching position at Galashiels, before proceeding to Aberdeen, where he became headmaster of St Margaret's School for Girls. While at Galashiels, he played club cricket for Gala. He was selected to play for Scotland in 1906, making a single first-class appearance against the touring West Indians at Edinburgh. Batting twice in the match, he was dismissed for 22 runs in the Scotland first innings by Sydney Smith, while in their second innings he was dismissed for 16 runs by Oliver Layne. Hoggarth died in Aberdeen at Woodend Hospital in January 1961.
