= George Challenor =

West Indian cricketer

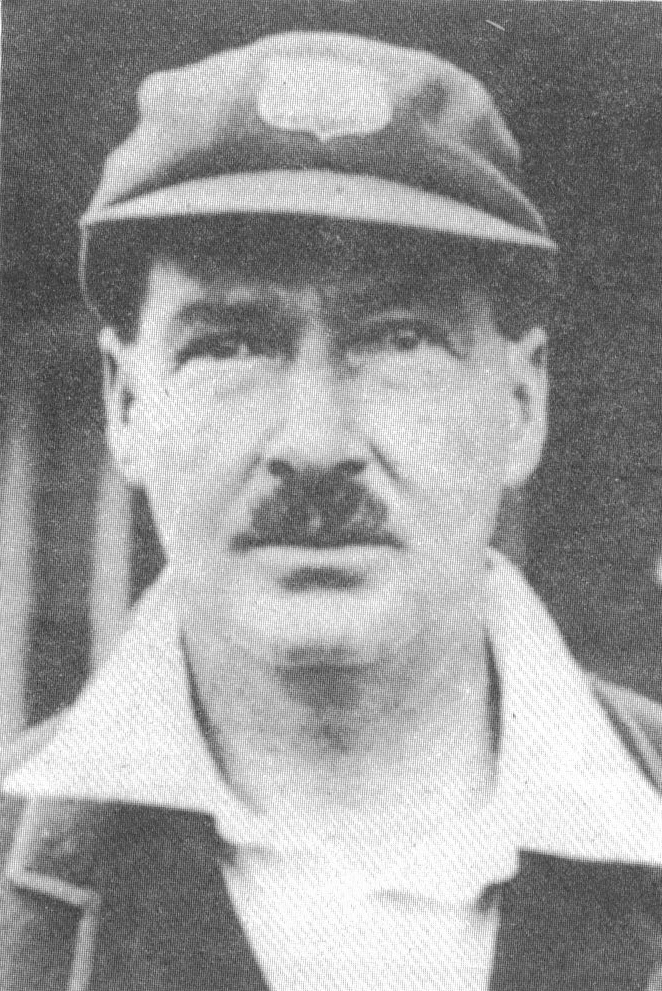

Personal information
- Full name: George Challenor
- Born: 28 June 1888; Saint Michael, Barbados
- Died: 30 July 1947 (aged 59); Saint Michael, Barbados
- Batting: Right-handed
- Bowling: Right-arm medium
- Relatives: EL Challenor (brother); R Challenor (brother); VC Challenor (brother)

International information
- National side: West Indies
- Test debut (cap 2): 23 June 1928 v England
- Last Test: 11 August 1928 v England

Domestic team information
- Years: Team
- 1905–1930: Barbados
- 1926: MCC

Career statistics
Competition	Test	First-class
Matches	3	95
Runs scored	101	5822
Batting average	16.83	38.55
100s/50s	0/0	15/29
Top score	46	237*
Balls bowled	0	2619
Wickets	–	54
Bowling average	–	23.88
5 wickets in innings	–	0
10 wickets in match	–	0
Best bowling	–	4/16
Catches/stumpings	0/–	25/–
- Source: , 31 January 2010

George Challenor (28 June 1888 – 30 July 1947) was a Barbadian cricketer who was part of the first West Indies Test side, and who faced the very first ball bowled to a West Indian cricketer in a Test match. He was recognised as the first great West Indian batsman, his obituary in Wisden Cricketer's Almanack ending with the words "His admirable batting did much toward raising cricket in West Indies to Test match standard". Challenor was born in Waterloo, St. Michael, Barbados and died in Collymore Rock, St. Michael, Barbados. He visited England three times as a member of a West Indian touring team; in 1906, 1923 and 1928.

His elder brothers Edward, Vicary and Robert all played cricket, while his uncle George Whitehall had played for Barbados in early inter-colonial matches. His brother Edward was a well known cricketer who played for Barbados, Western Province, Natal, Leicestershire and the Army. Edward and George played against each other on the 1906 tour of England, Edward playing in the M.C.C. side at Lord's.
In June 1988 he was celebrated on the Barbadian 45c stamp alongside the Barbados Cricket Buckle.

== Pre-war cricket ==
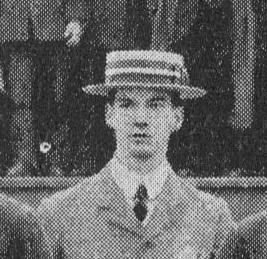
George Challenor in 1906

He made his debut in important cricket for Barbados in the 1905–06 Inter-Colonial Tournament in Trinidad aged 17. He scored 94 runs in his 4 innings. The team for the forthcoming tour of England was decided after this tournament and Challenor was one of those chosen. Before this 1906 tour he was described as "the baby of the team, good and polished bat" and "a member of the famous cricketing family who should score a fine average. He is an attractive bat who combines brilliant hitting with sound defence. He is young but most promising".

He was something of a success on the tour scoring 684 runs in 12 first class matches at an average of 28.50. He made a slow start to the tour and it wasn't until the 10th match of the tour against the M.C.C. that he got his first half-century, a useful 59 made in 80 minutes. Thereafter he scored 90 against Scotland, 97 in a minor match against Northumberland and Durham, 63 against Leicestershire, 108 against Nottinghamshire and 67 against Northamptonshire. In all matches he scored 1017 runs, one of only 3 tourists to reach a thousand runs.

Thereafter he was a regular member of the Barbados side and was chosen for the combined West Indies team again the M.C.C. tourists in both 1910–11 and 1912–13. In 1910–11 he scored a useful 75 for the combined team while in 1912–13 he scored 118 and 109 for Barbados against the tourists, while having no success with the combined team. From 1910 onwards he also began to become a useful medium pace bowler.

== Post-war cricket ==
After World War I he had more success for Barbados which led to him being chosen for the 1923 tour to England. He was then 34, exactly twice the age he had been in 1906. He was particularly brilliant on this tour, scoring 1,556 runs in first-class matches with six centuries (eight in all matches) and an average of 51.86 runs per innings. Early he in the tour he scored 87 against Surrey and 94 against Middlesex before scoring his first century in the 6th match against Oxford University and then 101 in his next innings against Essex. More big scores came regularly with more centuries against Northumberland, Nottinghamshire, Gloucestershire, Surrey, Glamorgan and Norfolk. He eventually finished third in the 1923 batting averages behind Patsy Hendren and Phil Mead.

Returning to the West Indies he had more success for Barbados scoring 114 against Trinidad in 1923–24 and then 237* against Jamaica in 1924–25. After a gap of 14 years an M.C.C. team toured the West Indies in 1925–26 and Challenor was an automatic choice for the representative matches against the tourists.

He was in England in the summer of 1926 playing a number of matches for M.C.C. and the Gentlemen v Players.

Although he didn't have great success in the trial matches in 1927–28 he was an automatic choice for the West Indies' initial Test tour of England in 1928. He played in the three Tests during the tour but, turning 40 years of age during the tour, was not the power he had been five years earlier. In first-class matches, he scored 1,074 runs at an average of 27. All three Test matches were lost by an innings in just over two days; in each of them, Challenor made runs and shared in decent opening partnerships in the first innings, but then failed in the second innings.

Another M.C.C. team toured the West Indies in 1929–30 during which the first ever Test matches were played in the West Indies. Challenor played for Barbados against the tourists in their first match. He scored 51 but this marked the end of his first class career.

== Averages ==
The following are his first class batting figures on his 3 tours to England with the West Indians.

Season	P	I	NO	R	HS	Ave	100	50
1906	12	24	0	684	108	28.50	1	4
1923	20	35	5	1556	155*	51.86	6	8
1928	24	40	1	1074	97	27.53	0	8
