= Bertie Harragin =

West Indian sportsman

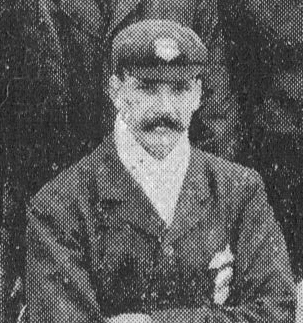
- Bertie Harragin in 1906

Personal information
- Born: 4 May 1877 Port of Spain, Trinidad
- Died: 21 May 1941 (aged 64) Port of Spain, Trinidad

Sport
- Sport: Cricket/Athletics
- Event: pole jump

Alfred Ernest Albert Harragin (4 May 1877 in Port of Spain, Trinidad – 21 May 1941 at Port of Spain, Trinidad) was a West Indian cricketer who toured England in 1906 and was a member of the Trinidad team from 1896-97 (when aged 19) to 1931–32 when he was 54. He was a hard-hitting right-handed batsman.

== Biography ==
He was educated at Queen's Royal College in Trinidad where he excelled as an athlete. Later on he was to hold a number of Trinidadian and West Indian records for various track and field events. He was also a record holder for longest cricket ball throw.

Apart from cricket he had other sporting interests including football, rowing, horse racing and cycling. He was a Deputy Inspector General in the Police Service.

He made his debut for Trinidad against Lord Hawke's team and also played against Arthur Priestley's team. In 1901–02 he was selected for the combined West Indies team against RA Bennett's XI and again against Lord Brackley's XI in 1904-05.

He was a selector for, and member of, the second West Indies touring side that toured England in 1906. He was second in the West Indies batting averages, although he played only 11 of the 19 matches. He got a leg injury in the match against Kent and missed seven matches, six of them first class. Before the 1906 tour he was described as a "good bat and field" and "a player who can punish all types of bowling. He captained the Trinidad team this season and had fared particularly well in the inter-colonial matches. A brilliant man in the country, fast and a sure thrower". His top scores in the first class matches were 50, 51, 57 and 51 while he scored 86, 68 and 63 in minor matches. During this tour he made attempts to beat his West Indies record for throwing the cricket ball a distance of 128 yards 4 inches. While on tour he won the British AAA Championships title in the pole jump event (as it was called at the time) after jumping 3.15 metres at the 1906 AAA Championships.

Back in the West Indies he scored a career high 123 for Jamaica in the 1907-08 Inter-Colonial Tournament, making further sporadic appearances for Jamaica for the next 25 years. He came out of retirement in 1931-32 to captain Trinidad in the Inter-Colonial Tournament and lead Trinidad to their first victory against Barbados in Barbados since 1903-04. In his career of 40 first-class matches he had a respectable average of 26.
