= C. P. Cumberbatch =

Trinidadian cricketer

Personal information
- Born: 22 November 1882; Trinidad
- Died: 15 February 1922 (aged 39)
- Source: Cricinfo, 28 November 2020

C. P. Cumberbatch (22 November 1882 – 15 February 1922) was a Trinidadian cricketer. He played in ten first-class matches for Trinidad and Tobago from 1909 to 1922. During the West Indies 1906 tour to England, C. P. Cumberbatch was sometimes confused with Archie Cumberbatch. It was only in 2000 that much of the confusion concerning these two men was resolved by Ray Goble and Keith Sandiford.

== See also ==
- List of Trinidadian representative cricketers
