= International cricket in 1923–24 =

International cricket season

The 1923–24 international cricket season was from September 1923 to April 1924. The season consists with one minor international tour.

== Season overview ==
International tours
Start date	Home team	Away team	Results [Matches]			
Start date	Home team	Away team	Test	ODI	FC	LA
29 February 1924	New Zealand	New South Wales	—	—	0–2 [2]	—

== February ==
=== New South Wales in New Zealand ===
First-class series
No.	Date	Home captain	Away captain	Venue	Result
Match 1	29 Feb–3 March	Sydney Smith	Charlie Macartney	Jade Stadium, Christchurch	New South Wales by 8 wickets
Match 2	7–8 March	Sydney Smith	Charlie Macartney	Basin Reserve, Wellington	New South Wales by an innings and 126 runs
