= Keith Bancroft =

West Indian cricketer

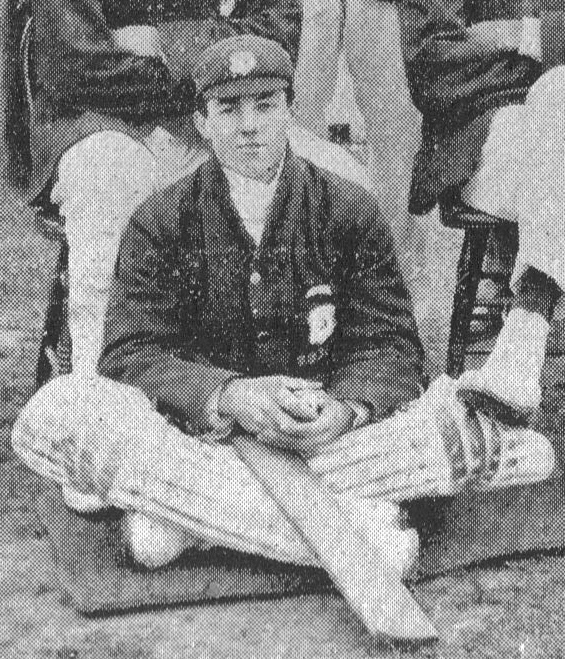
- Keith Bancroft in 1906

Personal information
- Full name: Claude Keith Bancroft
- Born: 30 October 1885; Fontabelle, Saint Michael, Barbados
- Died: 12 January 1919 (aged 33); Toronto, Ontario, Canada
- Batting: Right-handed
- Role: Wicket-keeper
- Relatives: Kenneth Bancroft (brother)

Domestic team information
- Years: Team
- 1904/05: Barbados

Career statistics
Competition	First-class
Matches	13
Runs scored	283
Batting average	14.15
100s/50s	–/1
Top score	53
Balls bowled	–
Wickets	–
Bowling average	–
5 wickets in innings	–
10 wickets in match	–
Best bowling	–
Catches/stumpings	12/7
- Source: Cricinfo, 25 September 2011

Claude Keith Bancroft (30 October 1885 in Fontabelle, St Michael, Barbados – 12 January 1919 in Toronto, Ontario, Canada) was a West Indian cricketer who toured with the second West Indian touring side to England in 1906 as their wicket-keeper.

== Career ==
In 1904–05 he played for Barbados against Lord Brackley's team and then for the combined West Indies team in Barbados.

He was chosen as the wicket-keeper for the 1906 tour to England. Before the tour he was described as "the wicket-leeper of the team, and will be of immense value to his side. Is at present studying at Cambridge, having won the last Barbados Scholarship" and "he is in residence at Cambridge as the team arrives in England. A wicketkeeper who is said to be very alert with the gloves. He kept well against Lord Brackley's XI and is also a steady bat". He played in 11 of the 13 first class matches during the tour, scoring 53 against Kent in 90 minutes. He had dislocated a finger in the match against Surrey.

In 1907 and 1908 he played in trial matches at Cambridge but never played in a first class match for the University, indeed he didn't play any first class cricket after the 1906 tour.

After his first-class career was over, he did play two matches for the Federated Malay States against the Straits Settlements in 1911.

His brother Kenneth also played for Barbados in 1904–05.
