= Terence Cole (cricketer) =

English cricketer

Personal information
- Full name: Terence George Owen Cole
- Born: 14 November 1877; Llanrhaiadr, Denbighshire, Wales
- Died: 15 December 1944 (aged 67); Stoke Court, near Taunton, Somerset, England
- Batting: Right-handed
- Bowling: Slow left-arm orthodox

Domestic team information
- Years: Team
- 1898: Cambridge University
- 1899: Marylebone Cricket Club
- 1904: Lancashire
- 1913: Derbyshire
- 1922: Somerset

Career statistics
Competition	FC
Matches	20
Runs scored	499
Batting average	15.59
100s/50s	0/3
Top score	68
Balls bowled	20
Wickets	0
Bowling average	–
5 wickets in innings	–
10 wickets in match	–
Best bowling	0/17
Catches/stumpings	9/–
- Source: CricketArchive, 22 December 2015

Terence George Owen Cole (14 November 1877 – 15 December 1944) played first-class cricket for nearly a quarter of a century, but only totalled 20 first-class matches in all.

In first-class cricket he appeared for Cambridge University, Marylebone Cricket Club (MCC) and three county sides – Lancashire, Derbyshire and Somerset. But exactly half of his 20 first-class games came on the Lord Brackley's XI tour of the West Indies in 1904–05. He was a middle-order right-handed batsman, though was occasionally used as an opening batsman.

Cole was born at Llanrhaiadr, Denbighshire, the son of Francis Burton Owen Cole JP DL, formerly Captain in the 7th Royal Fusiliers, and his wife Mary Georgiana Lyster. Cole's mother died in 1881 and his father remarried two years later. He was educated at Harrow School, where he was a promising schoolboy batsman and bowler. He made 142 for Harrow in the annual match against Eton College at Lord's in 1897, at the time the highest score ever made by a Harrow player in the match. He also made the highest aggregate score in the match. He went to Trinity Hall, Cambridge in 1897, but at Cambridge the following year he played in only one first-class match and made little impression in that, nor in a second match for MCC against Cambridge in 1899. He then played regularly in the Liverpool area in the early years of the 20th century before making a single appearance for Lancashire in a match against Leicestershire in May 1904. He was out for a duck.

Lord Brackley's XI toured the West Indies in leisurely fashion in the first four months of 1905, playing 20 matches in all, half of which were deemed to be of first-class status. The team consisted mainly of amateur cricketers of very mixed abilities, plus a couple of hard-worked professionals. Cole played in all of the first-class matches, and made 50s in three of them, including 68 against Jamaica, batting at No 9, which remained his highest score. In 1906, Brackley's team reassembled at Lord's for a match against the West Indian touring team: Cole made 59 as Brackley's team won the match, but it did not count as first-class.

Seven years then passed before Cole's next appearances in senior cricket. Between May and July 1913, he appeared six times for Derbyshire, making 171 runs at a fairly respectable average of 15.54 but having a highest score of only 36. That, though, came in a match against Sussex at County Ground, Hove, in which Cole top-scored in both innings as Derbyshire went down to a heavy defeat.

After the First World War, Cole settled in Somerset and made frequent appearances for the amateur (and not wholly serious) Somerset Stragglers side. He also made one final first-class appearance for his new county: a game in 1922 against Oxford University in which he made 1 and 18. Cole died at Stoke Court, Stoke St Mary, near Taunton, Somerset.
