= John Parker (West Indian cricketer) =

West Indian cricketer

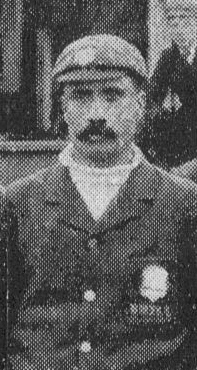
- John Parker in 1906

Personal information
- Full name: John Ernest Parker
- Born: 2 July 1871; Plantation Vigilance, Demerara, British Guiana
- Died: 1946 (aged 74–75); Georgetown, Demerara, British Guiana
- Batting: Right-handed
- Bowling: Leg break googly

Domestic team information
- Years: Team
- 1905/06–1909/10: British Guiana

Career statistics
Competition	First-class
Matches	8
Runs scored	61
Batting average	4.35
100s/50s	–/–
Top score	15
Balls bowled	480
Wickets	5
Bowling average	56.20
5 wickets in innings	–
10 wickets in match	–
Best bowling	2/28
Catches/stumpings	4/–
- Source: CricketArchive, 14 October 2011

John Ernest Parker (2 July 1871 in Plantation Vigilance, East Coast, Demerara, British Guiana – 1946 in Georgetown, Demerara, British Guiana) was a West Indian cricketer who toured with the second West Indian touring side to England in 1906. He was a right-handed batsman and leg break/googly bowler.

He made his debut in important cricket for British Guiana in the 1905-06 Inter-Colonial Tournament in Trinidad. He scored 6 and 3 and took no wickets. The team for the forthcoming tour of England was decided after this tournament and surprisingly Parker was one of those chosen.

He was a complete disappointment on the 1906 tour to England averaging just 6 with the bat and taking just 4 wickets. Before the tour he was described as "a slow bowler of great merit; took part in the late Intercolonial cricket matches played at Trinidad, and, although not successful in getting wickets, greatly impressed the selectors; hence his inclusion in the team" and "a slow bowler of the Armstrong type, with a field placed on the on-side; a fair defensive batsman and excellent slip".

He played in the next two Inter-Colonial Tournaments in 1907-08 and 1907-08 again with a complete lack of success and this marked the end of his career in important matches.
