= Charles Ebden (cricketer) =

English cricketer

Charles Hotson Murray Ebden (29 June 1880 – 24 May 1949), sometimes known as Tommy Ebden, was an English cricketer active from 1902 to 1909 who played for Sussex and Middlesex in the County Championship. He also played first-class cricket for Cambridge University, Marylebone Cricket Club (MCC) and Scotland, and with Lord Brackley's XI on tour in the West Indies. He was born in Westminster and died in Elvanfoot, Lanarkshire. He appeared in 40 first-class matches as a righthanded batsman who scored 1,465 runs with a highest score of 137. Ebden also represented England at hockey.

Ebden was educated at Eton and Trinity College, Cambridge. During World War I he was a Lieutenant in the Royal Naval Volunteer Reserve.
