= Jimmy Cameron =

West Indian cricketer

Personal information
- Born: 23 June 1923; Kingston, Jamaica
- Died: 10 June 1994 (aged 70); Kingston, Jamaica
- Batting: Right-handed
- Bowling: Right-arm offbreak

International information
- National side: West Indies
- Test debut (cap 68): 10 November 1948 v India
- Last Test: 4 February 1949 v India

Career statistics
| Competition | Test | First-class |
|---|---|---|
| Matches | 5 | 21 |
| Runs scored | 151 | 551 |
| Batting average | 25.16 | 25.04 |
| 100s/50s | 0/1 | 0/3 |
| Top score | 75* | 75* |
| Balls bowled | 786 | 3,218 |
| Wickets | 3 | 29 |
| Bowling average | 92.66 | 48.65 |
| 5 wickets in innings | 0 | 0 |
| 10 wickets in match | 0 | 0 |
| Best bowling | 2/74 | 4/52 |
| Catches/stumpings | 0/– | 9/– |
- Source: CricInfo, 30 October 2022

Francis James Cameron (22 June 1923 – 10 June 1994) was a cricketer who played in five Test matches for the West Indian cricket team in India in 1948–49.

== Biography ==
Cameron was a right-handed middle- or lower-order batsman and a right-arm off-break bowler. His first-class cricket career is one of the odder ones: he played only 21 first-class matches, and 14 of those were on the West Indies tour to India, Pakistan and Ceylon (Sri Lanka) in 1948–49, and another four were on the Canadian tour to England in 1954.

A student in Canada at the time, Cameron was picked for the West Indies tour of India after only two first-class matches, both for Jamaica, and his Test debut was his fifth first-class match. In a series dominated by high scoring batsmen and often-wayward West Indian fast bowling, Cameron batted low in the order and was used mainly as a stock bowler. In the second match, at Bombay (Mumbai), he scored an undefeated 75 as the West Indies piled up a second successive score of more than 600; in all five Tests, he took just three wickets.

At the end of the tour, Cameron disappeared from first-class cricket for five years, reappearing in four matches played by the Canadian touring team in England in 1954. He then made only one further first-class appearance, for Jamaica in 1959–60. Outside first-class cricket, he played much League cricket in England.

Cameron's older brother John also played Test cricket and appeared in first-class cricket for Jamaica, Somerset and Cambridge University. Their father, John Joseph Cameron, also played for Jamaica and was a member of the first West Indian cricket team to tour England in 1906.
