= Cyril Foley =

English cricketer, military officer, and archaeologist

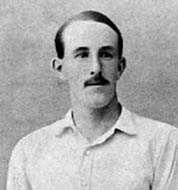

Personal information
- Full name: Cyril Pelham Foley
- Born: 1 November 1868; Westminster, Middlesex, England
- Died: 9 March 1936 (aged 67); Wimborne St Giles, Dorset, England
- Batting: Right-handed
- Bowling: Right-arm slow
- Relatives: St George Gerald Foley (father)

Domestic team information
- Years: Team
- 1888 to 1891: Cambridge University
- 1893 to 1906: Middlesex

Career statistics
Competition	First-class
Matches	123
Runs scored	3175
Batting average	16.62
100s/50s	2/11
Top score	117
Balls bowled	68
Wickets	1
Bowling average	26.00
5 wickets in innings	0
10 wickets in match	0
Best bowling	1/14
Catches/stumpings	43/0
- Source: Cricinfo, 20 February 2017

Lieut. Col. Cyril Pelham Foley (1 November 1868 – 9 March 1936) was an English cricketer, military officer and archaeologist.

== Early life and education ==
Foley was born in Westminster, the son of General The Hon. Sir St George Gerald Foley, who was, among other things, Lieutenant Governor of Guernsey from 1874 to 1879.

He attended Eton College, where he was a prominent cricketer, scoring a century in the victory over Harrow in 1886. In 1887 he went up to Trinity Hall, Cambridge, where he was again a leading cricketer, playing in three successive victories for Cambridge over Oxford from 1889 to 1891.

== Cricket career ==
Foley was a patient opening batsman, sound in defence and strong on the off side. He scored his two first-class centuries for Cambridge University: 113 against Marylebone Cricket Club (MCC) in 1889, when Cambridge won by two wickets, and 117 against Sussex in 1890, when he added 214 for the fourth wicket with Gregor MacGregor and Cambridge won by 425 runs.

He played 57 first-class matches for Middlesex between 1893 and 1906, and was also a regular member of MCC teams from 1888 to 1906, playing 33 first-class matches. He toured the West Indies with Lord Brackley's XI in 1904–05, playing all of the 10 first-class matches, scoring 239 runs at an average of 14.05, with a top score of 58 in the victory over Barbados.

== Military career ==
Foley was commissioned as a second lieutenant in the King's Shropshire Light Infantry in November 1888 while a student at Cambridge. After leaving Cambridge, he joined the staff of Lord Houghton, Viceroy of Ireland.

He took part in the Jameson Raid of 1895–96 in the Transvaal, and later served with distinction in the Boer War, returning as temporary commander of the 3rd Royal Scots.

During the First World War Foley commanded the 9th East Lancashire Regiment, serving for nearly two years in the trenches of France and Salonika without leave, and was mentioned in dispatches. He also served in the Royal Flying Corps, gaining the rank of lieutenant-colonel.

In 1920 Foley transferred to Military Intelligence and served in Dublin during the Irish War of Independence. He resigned his commission and returned to London in October 1920.

== Archaeologist ==
Foley was one of the members of an archaeological expedition party known as the Parker expedition that excavated in the Kidron Valley near Jerusalem in 1909 in an attempt to discover the Ark of the Covenant. He joined the expedition in 1909 and for a limited time in 1910. He was not in Jerusalem in 1911. On 30 and 31 August 1909 he explored the Dragon's Shaft together with Clarence Chesney Wilson and Mr Walsh, the civil engineer. They were the first people to do so since Sir Charles Warren and Sergeant Birtles fifty years before them.

He wrote his memoirs, Autumn Foliage, in 1935.
