= Tris Bennett =

English cricketer (1902–1978)

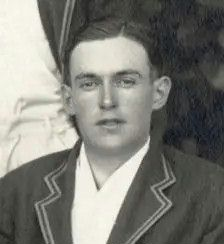
- Bennett in Jamaica in 1926

Personal information
- Full name: Cecil Tristram Bennett
- Born: 10 August 1902; Tulse Hill, London, England
- Died: 3 February 1978 (aged 75); Islington, London, England
- Batting: Right-handed
- Role: Batsman

Domestic team information
- Years: Team
- 1922: Surrey
- 1923–25: Cambridge University
- 1926–27: Middlesex

Career statistics
Competition	First-class
Matches	50
Runs scored	1,335
Batting average	17.56
100s/50s	0/5
Top score	88
Catches/stumpings	43/–
- Source: Cricinfo, 4 May 2025

Cecil Tristram "Tris" Bennett (10 August 1902 – 3 February 1978) was an English first-class cricketer who played for Middlesex, Surrey, Marylebone Cricket Club (MCC) and Cambridge University between 1922 and 1927 as a right-handed batsman. Regarded as a brilliant slip fielder, Bennett held 43 catches in his 50 first-class matches.

Bennett was educated at Harrow School, where he captained the first XI in his final year, 1921, and at Cambridge University, where he also captained the first XI in his final year, 1925. His highest first-class score was 88, when he captained Cambridge University to victory over Sussex in 1925. He toured the West Indies in 1925–26 with the MCC team, but played in only four of the 12 first-class matches.

Bennett wrote a memoir of his cricket career in the 1974 edition of Wisden, titled "When Three-Day Cricket Was Worthwhile".
