= John Cameron (West Indian cricketer) =

West Indian cricketer

Personal information
- Full name: John Hemsley Cameron
- Born: 8 April 1914; Kingston, Jamaica
- Died: 13 February 2000 (aged 85); Chichester, Sussex, England
- Batting: Right-handed
- Bowling: Right-arm leg break Right-arm off-break
- Relatives: Jimmy Cameron(brother)

International information
- National side: West Indies
- Test debut (cap 45): 24 June 1939 v England
- Last Test: 22 July 1939 v England

Domestic team information
- Years: Team
- 1932–1947: Somerset
- 1946: Jamaica
- 1934–1937: Cambridge University

Career statistics
Competition	Test	First-class
Matches	2	105
Runs scored	6	2772
Batting average	2.00	18.23
100s/50s	0/0	4/4
Top score	5	113
Balls bowled	232	10347
Wickets	3	184
Bowling average	29.33	30.77
5 wickets in innings	0	7
10 wickets in match	0	0
Best bowling	3/66	7/73
Catches/stumpings	0/–	64/–
- Source: CricketArchive, 1 February 2010

John Hemsley Cameron (8 April 1914 – 13 February 2000) was a cricketer who played in two Tests for the West Indian cricket team in 1939. But though Jamaican by birth, Cameron played only once for Jamaica, the bulk of his first-class cricket career being spent in England.

Cameron was a lower-order right-handed batsman of uncomplicated methods and a bowler who began as a prodigious leg-spin and googly bowler, but turned to off-breaks when he lost the knack of wrist spin. He came to early fame as a schoolboy cricketer in 1931 when, having played for Taunton School, he was picked for the Rest of England side against the Public Schools XI and took all 10 wickets in the Schools' innings for 49 runs. The next season, 1932, he played a couple of matches for Somerset.

Cameron then went up to St Catharine's College, Cambridge. From 1934, he played for four seasons for Cambridge University, winning a Blue three times, and turned out for Somerset in the university holidays. As a bowler, his best season was 1935, when he took 60 wickets; as a batsman, he scored 863 runs in 1937.

In 1938, he played twice in first-class cricket in Jamaica, both times for the touring combined Oxford and Cambridge University side against the island team. But in 1939, he was back in England as vice-captain of the West Indies touring team. He played in the first two Test matches, taking the first three wickets to fall in the England first innings at Lord's: the three were Harold Gimblett, Eddie Paynter and Wally Hammond, and they remained Cameron's only Test wickets. Wisden reported in 1940 that Cameron was "not reliable with bat or ball", and he was injured for latter part of the tour.

After the Second World War, Cameron played his one match for Jamaica and a handful of games for Somerset, but retired in 1947. He was a schoolteacher.

His father, John Joseph Cameron, was a doctor, and played first-class cricket for Jamaica and toured England with the first West Indian cricket team in 1906; his brother Jimmy Cameron was a Test cricketer as well, and played for both Jamaica and Canada.
