= James McDonogh =

Irish cricketer

Personal information
- Full name: James John Murphy McDonogh
- Born: 13 April 1871; Killarney, Ireland
- Died: 26 January 1912 (aged 40); Philadelphia, Pennsylvania, United States
- Batting: Unknown
- Bowling: Unknown

Domestic team information
- Years: Team
- 1908/09: Europeans (India)

Career statistics
Competition	First-class
Matches	6
Runs scored	203
Batting average	18.45
100s/50s	–/2
Top score	86
Balls bowled	618
Wickets	10
Bowling average	25.70
5 wickets in innings	–
10 wickets in match	–
Best bowling	4/53
Catches/stumpings	3/–
- Source: ESPNcricinfo, 30 November 2018

James John Murphy McDonogh (13 April 1871 – 26 January 1912) was an Irish first-class cricketer.

McDonogh was born at Killarney in County Kerry in April 1871. His debut in first-class cricket came in New Zealand for the North Island against a touring New South Wales team at Wellington in February 1894. His next appearances in first-class cricket came nearly a decade later in British India, when he played two matches for the Europeans against the Parsees in 1903. Emigrating to the United States, McDonogh later played three first-class matches for the Gentlemen of Philadelphia against Jamaica during their 1908–09 tour of Jamaica. Across six first-class matches, McDonogh scored 203 runs at an average of 18.45, with a highest score of 86. This score, one of two half-centuries he made, came for the Gentlemen of Philadelphia against Jamaica. With the ball, he took 10 wickets at a bowling average of 25.70, with best innings figures of 4/53. He died at Philadelphia in January 1912.
