= Oliver Layne =

West Indian cricketer

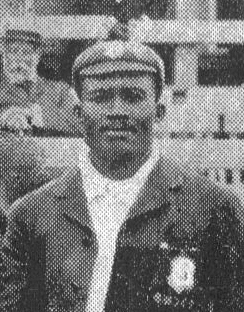
- Oliver Layne in 1906

Personal information
- Full name: Oliver Hoffran Layne
- Born: 3 July 1876; Saint Michael, Barbados
- Died: 16 August 1932 (aged 56); New York City, New York, United States of America
- Batting: Right-handed
- Bowling: Right-arm medium

Domestic team information
- Years: Team
- 1909/10–1912/13: British Guiana
- 1901/02–1904/05: Barbados

Career statistics
Competition	First-class
Matches	27
Runs scored	1,023
Batting average	22.23
100s/50s	1/5
Top score	15
Balls bowled	4,149
Wickets	91
Bowling average	22.36
5 wickets in innings	6
10 wickets in match	2
Best bowling	9/19
Catches/stumpings	19/–
- Source: CricketArchive, 14 October 2011

Oliver Hoffran Layne (3 July 1876 in Brittons Hill, St Michael, Barbados – 16 August 1932 at Bellevue Hospital, New York City) was a West Indian cricketer who toured England in 1906. He was a right-handed batsman and right arm medium pace bowler.

Being a professional, he had limited opportunities to play in important matches, the Inter-Colonial Tournament being restricted to amateurs only. He made his debut for Barbados against Lord Brackley's XI in 1904-05 and had immediate success scoring 93 runs and taking 11 wickets in two matches. Such was his success that he was immediately selected for the combined West Indies team in all three of their matches against the tourists. However, in these matches he had little success.

His next important matches were against Lord Brackley's team in 1904-05 when he scored 28 and took 5 wickets in the Barbados match. Again he achieved little in his two matches for the combined West Indies team.

He was selected for the second West Indies touring side that toured England in 1906. In 10 first class matches he scored 465 at an average of 23.25 and took 34 wickets at an average of 24.08. Before the 1906 tour he was described as a "good bat, bowled and field" and "a professional and fast right hand bowler who can make the ball bump and is none too pleasant to play on a bad wicket. He is a fine long field with a dashing return and is a sound, careful bat". He made a brilliant start to the tour taking 6–74 in the second innings of the first match and then scoring 106 in 3 hours in the second match against Essex. He took 7–76 against Surrey, 63 against Derbyshire, 5–36 against Durham and Northumberland, 63 and 50 against Yorkshire, 62 and 5–14 against Norfolk and generally proved himself a more than useful all-rounder.

Back in the West Indies he moved to British Guiana. He played for British Guiana against William Shepherd's team in 1909-10 taking 6-63, 4-44, 9-19 and 2–90 in the two matches and scoring 12 and 76*. He then became part of Shepherd's team when they moved on to Trinidad and took 4–54 in the first match. He played for the combined West Indies against the M.C.C. tourists in 1910-11 and was again selected when they toured again in 1912-13.

He later emigrated to New York and this marked the end of his first class career.
