= Clive Burn =

English cricketer, polo player, and Duchy of Cornwall officer

Roland Clive Wallace Burn
- Born: 29 October 1882; London, England
- Died: 8 May 1955 (aged 72); London, England
- Education: Winchester College; Oriel College
- Occupation: Keeper of the Record to the Duchy of Cornwall
- Spouse: Phyllis Burn (m. 1911)
- Children: 4, including Micky Burn

Sir Roland Clive Wallace Burn KCVO (29 October 1882 – 8 May 1955) was Secretary and Keeper of the Record to the Duchy of Cornwall from 1936 to 1954 and was Solicitor to Duchy of Cornwall from 1940. He was also a cricketer and a polo player. Burn was appointed a Commander of the Royal Victorian Order (CVO) in 1942 and knighted in 1948.

== Education and career ==
Burn was educated at Winchester College and then Oriel College, Oxford University. He was admitted as a solicitor in 1912 and worked for the firm of Burn and Berridge until his appointment to the Duchy of Cornwall.

== Sports ==
Burn played cricket for the Oxford University Cricket Club for four seasons from 1902 to 1905 as a slow left arm bowler. As a student he dismissed C. B. Fry five times. He toured with Lord Brackley's cricket team in the West Indies in 1904-05, which was the fifth team of English cricketers to tour the West Indies. He also toured the United States and Canada with the Marylebone Cricket Club in 1905.

After finishing his studies at Oxford University, Burn played polo for the Stoke D'Abernon and Worcester Park clubs and won the 1909 Junior County Cup, the Roehampton's Ladies Nomination Tournament and the Winan's Cup and Kingsbury Cup.

== Military ==
Burn served during World War I in the Sussex Yeomanry and the Machine Gun Corps (Cavalry) as 2nd Lieutenant. He attained the rank of Captain and also served as an acting Major. At Gallipoli as a divisional machine gun officer, Burn was ordered to assist in the withdrawal at Gully Beach and was the last person in the regiment to leave the peninsula. After Gallipoli, he served in Egypt and Palestine and then in 1918 on the Western front. Burn was wounded in the foot in March 1918 during the Germans’ last offensive.

== Personal life ==
Burn was married to Phyllis Burn (née Stoneham) (1883–1958) from 1911 until his death in 1955. His father-in-law was Allen Stoneham who, with John Robinson Whitley, was instrumental in developing the golf and gambling resort of Le Touquet. The couple had four children: Micky (1912–2010), Alan (1914–1998), Stella (1916–2004) and Renee (1919–1984), first wife of diplomat Lees Mayall.
