= Bill Francis (broadcaster) =

New Zealand broadcaster and author

Bill Francis ONZM JP
- Born: William Peter Francis; 1947 (age 78–79); Masterton, New Zealand
- Occupations: Sports journalist and broadcaster

William Peter Francis ONZM JP (born 1947) is a New Zealand broadcaster, author and sports administrator.

== Life and career ==
Francis was born in Masterton, where he attended Wairarapa College. After leaving school he started as a cadet journalist with Radio 2XB in Masterton in 1965. He worked as a sports journalist in Hamilton and Dunedin before moving to Auckland in 1983 to become sports editor of the new Newstalk 1ZB. Ten years later, he was promoted to general manager of Talk Programming for The Radio Network, with a principal responsibility for Newstalk ZB and Radio Sport.

Francis is a director of Radio New Zealand. He has been chief executive of the Radio Broadcasters Association, and chairman of the New Zealand Radio Awards Committee and the Radio Industry Research Committee. He has been on the board of the Advertising Standards Authority and a member of the New Zealand Music Performance Committee and the Online Media Standards Authority Complaints Board. He has also been a director of New Zealand Cricket and Auckland Cricket and as a trustee of the Auckland Cricket Development Fund. He is the chairman of the board of the Northern Stars netball team.

In the 2016 New Year Honours, Francis was appointed an Officer of the New Zealand Order of Merit, for services to broadcasting and cricket.

== Books ==
- A Handbook for Sports Bodies Dealing with the Media (1982)
- Promote Your Sport: The Media Handbook for New Zealand Sport (1992)
- And Then There Were Ten: The Francis' of Masterton (1997)
- Inside Talk Radio (2002)
- ZB: The Voice of an Iconic Radio Station (2006)
- Tom Lowry: Leader in a Thousand (2010)
- Sir John Graham: Sportsman, Master, Mentor (2011)
- The Team That Never Played: Wahine and the 1968 Otago University Cricket Team (2013, with Ronald Cardwell)
- Cricket's Mystery Man: The Story of Sydney Gordon Smith: West Indies, MCC, New Zealand (2014)
- Peter Montgomery: The Voice of Yachting (2015)
- A Singular Man: Bevan Congdon (2017)
- In Pursuit of Excellence: The Barry Sinclair Story (2018)
- Second Only to Bradman: The Life of Stewie Dempster (2019)
- Talent to Burn: Mark Burgess (2020)
- "Tails" to Tell: The Bruce Taylor Story (2021)
- True to the Spirit of Cricket (2024; on Don Neely)
