= Sydney Smith (cricketer, born 1881) =

Trinidadian cricketer (1881–1963)

Personal information
- Full name: Sydney Gordon Smith
- Born: 15 January 1881; San Fernando, Trinidad and Tobago
- Died: 25 October 1963 (aged 82); Auckland, New Zealand
- Batting: Left-handed
- Bowling: Slow left-arm orthodox

Domestic team information
- Years: Team
- 1899/00–1905/06: Trinidad
- 1907–1914: Northamptonshire
- 1917/18–1925/26: Auckland

Career statistics
| Competition | First-class |
|---|---|
| Matches | 211 |
| Runs scored | 10,920 |
| Batting average | 31.28 |
| 100s/50s | 14/60 |
| Top score | 256 |
| Balls bowled | 40,396 |
| Wickets | 955 |
| Bowling average | 18.08 |
| 5 wickets in innings | 71 |
| 10 wickets in match | 19 |
| Best bowling | 9/34 |
| Catches/stumpings | 156/– |
- Source: CricketArchive, 28 May 2014

Sydney Gordon Smith (15 January 1881 – 25 October 1963) was a cricketer who had three distinct careers, playing for Trinidad in the West Indies, for Northamptonshire in England and for Auckland in New Zealand. He also played for representative sides: for the West Indies side that toured England in 1906; for MCC sides that toured the West Indies in 1910–11 and 1912–13; and for New Zealand in matches against MCC and Australian sides.

== West Indies career ==
Smith was a forceful left-handed middle-order batsman and a left-arm spin bowler. He played first for Trinidad in the 1899–1900 Inter-Colonial Tournament and was successful over the next few seasons primarily as a bowler. In 1901–02 he was selected for the combined West Indies team in Trinidad against a touring team led by Richard Bennett and including England Test players Bernard Bosanquet, Frederick Fane and Rockley Wilson. He took nine wickets for 34 in the first innings and followed that with seven for 51 in the second. He was again selected for the combined West Indies team in Trinidad against Lord Brackley's team three years later.

Sydney Smith in 1906

Smith was selected to tour England with the second West Indies team in 1906. He was described pre-tour as "the best amateur bowler in the West Indies, bowls slow left hand; can also bat very well" and "he is regarded as the crack bowler of the side. A left-hander with easy delivery who can make the ball break either way, and who sends down a deceptive fast ball. He can hit with vigour and precision and cuts well. He is a good field in the slips". Smith started the tour extremely well, being particularly effective against the weaker sides. After 8 matches (4 first class, 4 against minor teams) he had scored over 700 runs and taken over 50 wickets. After that his batting was disappointing although he continued to take wickets, including 12 in the final match against Northamptonshire. In first-class matches he scored 571 runs at an average of 24.82, including a century against Hampshire, and took 66 wickets at an average of 24.36. In all matches he performed the "double", scoring 1107 runs and taking 116 wickets, leading the averages in both categories.

== England career ==
After the 1906 tour, he stayed in England to qualify for county cricket with Northamptonshire. During his two-year residence qualification he was only able to play against the touring teams. In 1907 he took 10 wickets against the South Africans and in 1908 he scored 23 and 76* and took 9 wickets against the Philadelphians.

When he started playing regularly in 1909 he was an instant success, scoring more than 1000 runs and taking 115 wickets, his first full county season. In six seasons with the county, he passed the 1000-run mark four times and took 100 wickets four times, achieving the all-rounder's "double" in 1909, 1913 and 1914. In 1913, he became county captain during the season when George Vials fell ill and he retained the position in 1914. He was selected to play for the Gentlemen v Players a number of times, four times in the prestigious match at Lord's. He was named as a Wisden Cricketer of the Year in 1915 for his performances in 1914. By this time first-class cricket had been suspended in England because of the First World War. In all he played 119 first class matches for Northamptonshire scoring 6396 runs (with 12 centuries) and taking 502 wickets.

During his period with Northamptonshire he twice toured the West Indies; in 1910–11 and 1912–13. In 1910–11 he was second in the tourists first class batting averages and led their bowling averages, while 1912–13 his batting was a little disappointing but he was still second in the tourists' bowling averages.

== New Zealand career ==
Financial problems and the ill-health of a member of his family led Smith to move in late 1915 to New Zealand, where he settled in Auckland. He appeared for Auckland in first-class matches from 1917–18 through to 1925–26, when he retired from the first-class game.

In 1919–20, Smith scored 256 for Auckland against Canterbury, which was his highest first-class score. In the next game against Wellington he took eight wickets for 55 runs in the first innings, and 13 wickets in the match. He was selected for the New Zealand team against the Australians in 1920–21, the MCC in 1922–23 and against the touring New South Wales team in 1923–24. "He used his height to the full to bowl a leg-break with a dropping ball and gave some fine exhibitions with the bat, though already in his mid-thirties". In all he played five times for New Zealand and in 26 first class matches for Auckland.

His uncles Frederick and Augustus Smith played for Barbados in early inter-colonial cricket.

Smith worked as an insurance accountant. He and his wife had a son and a daughter. He died in Auckland in October 1963, aged 82. A biography, Cricket's Mystery Man: The Story of Sydney Gordon Smith: West Indies, MCC, New Zealand, by Bill Francis, was published in Australia in 2014.
