= Philadelphian cricket team in Jamaica in 1908–09 =

International cricket tour

The Philadelphian cricket team made a tour of Jamaica in February 1909. The Philadelphians played 3 first-class matches against the Jamaicans winning two and losing one. This was one of the last first-class tours for the Philadelphian team. The city of Philadelphia was nearing the end of its golden age of cricket and the last first-class game for the team would be played only three years later.

The series began at Sabina Park in Kingston on 15 February with a two-day match. In spite of a solid first innings batting performance from William Newhall, the visitors only managed 93 runs. The Jamaican side needed only 12 runs in their second innings to win the match by nine wickets. Charles Morrison did most of the damage for Jamaica taking 11-78 in the match.

On 17 February, the series continued at Kensington Park, Kingston. The Philadelphians won the toss and decided to bat first. Behind an 86 from Irish transplant James McDonogh, the visitors made 183 runs in their first innings. This was followed by a 150 from Jamaica. In their second innings, the Americans scored 223. Ranji Hordern bowled very well taking 8 wickets in each innings and helping to hold the home side to only 84 runs in their second innings. The Philadelphians took the match by 172. In this match Malcolm Kerr "staggered humanity by taking 6-30 in an innings, 9 for 100 in the match, against the Philadelphians, having scarcely been considered a bowler at all before", his last match for Jamaica.

The series concluded with another 2 day match on 19 February at Melbourne Park, Kingston. Again the Philadelphians won the toss and decided to go to bat first. Reggie Conyers, originally from Bermuda opened the batting with a 149 before being bowled. His side finished the first innings with 252 runs. The Jamaicans followed-on after making only 110 runs in their first innings. The Americans needed only 38 runs in their second innings to win the match by 8 wickets. Ranji Hordern again dominated the Philadelphian's bowling taking 13 for 113 in the match. Over the course of the series, Hordern took 34 wickets.
