= English cricket team in the West Indies in 1925–26 =

An English cricket team raised by Marylebone Cricket Club (MCC) toured the West Indies from January to March 1926 and played twelve first-class matches, including three against the West Indies cricket team which had not then achieved Test status. MCC, who were captained by Freddie Calthorpe, played their matches at Kensington Oval, Bridgetown; Queen's Park Oval, Port of Spain; Bourda, Georgetown; Sabina Park, Kingston; and Melbourne Park, also in Kingston. In the matches between the West Indies and MCC, the first in Bridgetown was drawn; MCC won by 5 wickets in Port of Spain; and the final match in Georgetown was drawn.

== The team ==
- Freddie Calthorpe (captain)
- Ewart Astill
- Tris Bennett
- George Collins
- Leonard Crawley
- Horace Dales
- Wally Hammond
- Percy Holmes
- Tom Jameson
- Roy Kilner
- Fred Root
- Tiger Smith
- Lionel Tennyson
- Frank Watson
