= History of cricket in New Zealand from 1918–19 to 1945 =

Aspect of the history of cricket in New Zealand

This article describes the history of New Zealand cricket from the 1918–19 season until 1945.

== Domestic cricket ==
=== Plunket Shield winners ===
- 1918–19 – Wellington, Canterbury
- 1919–20 – Canterbury, Auckland
- 1920–21 – Auckland, Wellington

After the 1920–21 season the competition changed from a challenge format to a single round robin format.

- 1921–22 – Auckland
- 1922–23 – Canterbury
- 1923–24 – Wellington
- 1924–25 – Otago
- 1925–26 – Wellington
- 1926–27 – Auckland
- 1927–28 – Wellington
- 1928–29 – Auckland
- 1929–30 – Wellington
- 1930–31 – Canterbury
- 1931–32 – Wellington
- 1932–33 – Otago
- 1933–34 – Auckland
- 1934–35 – Canterbury
- 1935–36 – Wellington
- 1936–37 – Auckland
- 1937–38 – Auckland
- 1938–39 – Auckland
- 1939–40 – Auckland
- 1940–45 – no competition due to World War II

== International tours of New Zealand ==
=== Australia 1920–21 ===
See: Australian cricket team in New Zealand in 1920–21

An Australian team captained by Vernon Ransford toured New Zealand in 1920–21 to play first-class matches versus New Zealand national team (twice) and provincial teams including Auckland, Wellington, Canterbury and Otago.

=== Marylebone Cricket Club 1922–23 ===
See: Marylebone Cricket Club cricket team in New Zealand in 1922–23

An English team raised by Marylebone Cricket Club (MCC) played three first-class matches versus the New Zealand national team. MCC also played twice against Auckland and once each versus Wellington, Canterbury and Otago. The MCC team was captained by Archie MacLaren and included Tich Freeman, Freddie Calthorpe, Percy Chapman and Clement Gibson.

=== Australia 1927–28 ===
See: Australian cricket team in New Zealand in 1927–28

The Australian team captained by Vic Richardson played first-class matches from February to April 1928 against the New Zealand national team (twice) and the main provincial teams Auckland, Wellington, Canterbury and Otago.

=== England 1929–30 ===
See: English cricket team in New Zealand in 1929–30

The England cricket team toured Australia and New Zealand in the 1929–30 season to play a Test series against New Zealand. This was the first Test series ever played in New Zealand. The England team was captained by Harold Gilligan and included Frank Woolley, Duleepsinhji and Stan Nichols.

England won the series 1–0 with three matches drawn:

- 1st Test @ Lancaster Park, Christchurch – England won by 8 wickets
- 2nd Test @ Basin Reserve, Wellington – match drawn
- 3rd Test @ Eden Park, Auckland – match drawn
- 4th Test @ Eden Park, Auckland – match drawn

England began the tour in October 1929 in Australia where they played five first-class matches. For the Australian leg of the tour, see: History of Australian cricket from 1918-19 to 1930.

The New Zealand section of the tour began in December and, in addition to the Test series, England played each of Auckland, Wellington, Canterbury and Otago.

=== South Africa 1931–32 ===
See: South African cricket team in New Zealand in 1931–32

The inaugural Test series between New Zealand and South Africa took place in New Zealand in 1931–32. South Africa won the two-match series 2–0 with no matches drawn:

- 1st Test @ Lancaster Park, Christchurch – South Africa won by an innings and 12 runs
- 2nd Test @ Basin Reserve, Wellington – South Africa won by 8 wickets

=== England 1932–33 ===
See: English cricket team in New Zealand in 1932–33

Douglas Jardine's England toured New Zealand after its infamous "bodyline" tour of Australia. England and New Zealand played a two-match Test series which was altogether more peaceful than the one in Australia. Both Tests were drawn:

- 1st Test @ Lancaster Park, Christchurch – match drawn
- 2nd Test @ Eden Park, Auckland – match drawn

=== Marylebone Cricket Club 1935–36 ===
See: Marylebone Cricket Club cricket team in New Zealand in 1935–36

An MCC team led by Errol Holmes toured New Zealand from December 1935 to March 1936, playing eight first-class matches including four against New Zealand. They were not Test matches.

=== England 1936–37 ===
See: English cricket team in New Zealand in 1936–37

The MCC team that toured Australia in the 1936–37 season also played three matches in New Zealand at the end of the tour. They played no Test matches in New Zealand, although one of the matches was against a representative New Zealand XI, all of whose team members toured England a few weeks later, playing three Test matches.

=== Sir Julien Cahn’s XI 1938–39 ===
Sir Julien Cahn's cricket team, captained by George Heane, toured New Zealand in February and March 1939 to play ten matches including one first-class fixture against the New Zealand national cricket team at Basin Reserve; this match was drawn. Cahn's XI also played against some of the provincial teams but these matches were 12-a-side and are not regarded as first-class.

=== Cancelled tours ===
A planned tour by a team of English amateurs in 1920–21, to be led by the Kent captain Lionel Troughton, had to be called off as the New Zealand Cricket Council was unable to raise sufficient money. A similar tour by an amateur MCC team in 1921–22, to be led by Jock Hartley and to consist mostly of Army officers, was also cancelled by the NZCC, which explained that the weakness of the selected team would be unlikely to draw sufficient crowds to cover costs.

Attempts to arrange a tour by a West Indian team in the mid-1920s did not come to fruition. At first it was hoped a tour could be arranged for the 1924–25 season, then the 1926–27 season, but it was not possible.

A request by the New Zealand Cricket Council for a two-Test tour by Australia in early 1931 was turned down by the Australian authorities on the grounds that their players needed a rest after a busy year of two five-Test series. A tour by the best Australian players who had not been selected for the Ashes tour of 1934 was arranged to take place between February and April 1934, but a disagreement between the respective cricket boards about financial terms, and the withdrawal of several of the selected players, led to the cancellation of the tour just before it was scheduled to begin.

A tour by India was arranged for November 1936 to February 1937, including six first-class matches and eight other matches, but no Tests. It was the brainchild of Arthur Sims and K. S. Duleepsinhji and was to be fully underwritten by Duleepsinhji's cousin the Jam Sahib of Nawanagar, who would also captain the side. Difficulties in India led to the cancellation of the tour in September 1936.

A Test tour by Australia, planned for February and March 1940, was cancelled after the outbreak of the Second World War. An itinerary of 14 matches – three Tests, four first-class matches against Plunket Shield teams, and seven other matches – had been arranged, and it was expected that Don Bradman would lead a strong team.

== See also ==
- History of cricket in New Zealand

== External sources ==
- CricketArchive – New Zealand season itineraries

== Annual reviews ==
- Wisden Cricketers' Almanack 1919 to 1945 editions
