= Hogarth =

Hogarth may refer to:

== People ==
- Burne Hogarth (1911–1996), American cartoonist, illustrator, educator and author
- David George Hogarth (1862–1927), English archaeologist
- Donald Hogarth (1879–1950), Canadian politician and mining financier
- Joseph Hogarth (1801–1879), British fine art print publisher and retailer
- Karole Hogarth, New Zealand nursing professor
- Mary Hogarth, sister-in-law of Charles Dickens
- Paul Hogarth (1917–2001), English painter and illustrator
- Steve Hogarth (born 1959), English musician; lead singer of the rock band Marillion
- Susan Hogarth, American libertarian politician
- Thomas William Hogarth (1901–1999), writer of books about the Bull Terrier breed of dog
- William Hogarth (1697–1764), English painter, engraver, pictorial satirist and cartoonist
  - Engraving Copyright Act 1734, or "Hogarth('s) Act"
  - John Collier (caricaturist) (1708–1786), artist, poet and satirical writer known as the "Lancashire Hogarth"
- William Hogarth Main, known as Bill Main, namesake of the Hogarthian system of dive equipment configuration

== Fictional characters ==
- Hogarth Pennywhistle "Hoagie" Gilligan Jr., otherwise known as Numbuh 2, a main character from the Cartoon Network series Codename: Kids Next Door
- Hogarth Hughes, main child character in the film The Iron Giant voiced by Eli Marienthal
- Peter Hogarth, the protagonist of Stanislaw Lem's His Master's Voice

== Organizations ==
- Hogarth Press, English publisher
- Hogarth Worldwide

== Transportation ==
- Hogarth Roundabout, a junction on the A4 road in west London
