= Edward Challenor =

British Army officer and cricketer

Brigadier-General Edward Challenor CB CMG CBE DSO
- Born: Edward Lacy Challenor; 10 March 1873; Barbados
- Died: 15 September 1935 (aged 62)
- Cricket career

Cricket information
- Batting: Right-handed

Career statistics
Competition	First-class
Matches	29
Runs scored	1,106
Batting average	21.68
100s/50s	1/3
Top score	111
Catches/stumpings	23/–
- Source: CricketArchive, 6 December 2022

Brigadier-General Edward Lacy Challenor, CB, CMG, CBE, DSO (10 March 1873 – 15 September 1935) was a British Army officer and first-class cricketer from Barbados.

He played in England with Leicestershire and in South Africa with Western Province and Natal. His brother George played Test cricket for West Indies.

Challenor joined the British Army where he was commissioned as a second lieutenant in the Leicestershire Regiment on 19 July 1893, and promoted to lieutenant on 1 July 1896.

He served with the 1st battalion of his regiment in the Second Boer War in South Africa 1899–1902. Taking part in the first major battle of the war, at Talana Hill in October 1899, he then joined the march from Dundee to Ladysmith, took part in the battle for the city the same month (which the British lost), and was in the city during the following siege. After Ladysmith was relieved in February 1900, the battalion was part of the following advance through Natal to Transvaal, taking part in several battles including Bergendal in August 1900. He then served in various parts of Transvaal during the next year, and was promoted to captain on 26 October 1901.

After the end of the war, Challenor joined 540 officers and men of the 1st Leicestershire leaving Port Natal on the SS Ortona in November 1902 for British India, where they were subsequently stationed at Madras.

He was promoted to major on 20 July 1912.

He later served in the First World War and was awarded the Distinguished Service Order (DSO). He commanded the Leicestershire Regiment from August 1919 to August 1923. He was appointed a Companion of the Order of St Michael and St George in the 1918 New Year Honours. He was appointed a Companion of the Order of the Bath in the 1919 New Year Honours and a Commander of the Order of the British Empire in the 1923 New Year Honours.
