= Helon Ollivierre =

Trinidadian cricketer

Personal information
- Born: 1881; Trinidad
- Died: 23 February 1907 (aged 25–26); Trinidad
- Source: Cricinfo, 28 November 2020

Helon Ollivierre (1881 – 23 February 1907) was a Trinidadian cricketer. He played in three first-class matches for Trinidad and Tobago from 1900 to 1904.

== See also ==
- List of Trinidadian representative cricketers
