= Arthur Bertram St Hill =

Barbadian cricketer (1872–1911)

Arthur Bertram St Hill (1872 – 25 August 1911) was an early cricketer in the West Indies. Born in Bridgetown, Barbados, he was a batsman of unknown handedness who led a tour of the Caribbean in 1899 that formed some of the earliest first class cricket games in the region. He, together with his invitational eleven 'AB St Hill's XI', played four matches on the tour, in which he scored only seventeen runs.
