= Keith A. P. Sandiford =

Canadian historian (1936–2026)

Keith Arlington Patrick Sandiford GCM (2 March 1936 – 28 August 2026) was a Barbadian-born Canadian historian. He was professor emeritus at the University of Manitoba from 2002 until his death.

== Life and career ==
Sandiford was born in Barbados and educated at Combermere School in Bridgetown. He received a BA from the University College of West Indies in 1960, an MA from the University of Toronto in 1961, and a PhD from the University of Toronto in 1966. He married Lorraine Small in 1963, and they had two children.

Sandiford taught history at the University of Manitoba from 1966 to 1998, chaired the Teaching Advisory Committee from 1986 to 1993, and was professor emeritus from 2002 until his death in 2026. He received the Gold Crown of Merit from the Government of Barbados in 2004. He specialised in social history of the 19th and 20th centuries, with a particular interest in the importance of cricket in society. He said: "Having visited several parts of the Commonwealth in the twentieth century, I remain convinced that Bradman, Grace, and Sobers are immeasurably more important in the overall scheme of things than Disraeli, Gladstone, and Palmerston."

Sandiford died in Winnipeg on 28 August 2026, aged 90.

== Books ==
- Great Britain and the Schleswig-Holstein Question: A Study in Diplomacy, Politics, and Public Opinion (1975)
- 100 Years of Organised Cricket in Barbados, 1892–1992 (1992; edited with Ronald Hughes and Carlisle Burton)
- Cricket and the Victorians (1994)
- Everton DeCourcey Weekes (1995)
- Combermere School and the Barbadian Society (1995; with Earle H. Newton)
- Clyde Leopold Walcott (1996)
- Frank Worrell (1997)
- Cricket Nurseries of Colonial Barbados: The Elite Schools, 1865–1966 (1998)
- Gary Sobers (1998)
- The Imperial Game: Cricket, Culture and Society (1998; edited with Brian Stoddart)
- Cassius: From Wharf Boy to Role Model: The Life and Times of an Extraordinary Barbadian (2000)
- Wes Hall (2001)
- At the Crease with Gary Sobers: His Partnerships in Test Cricket (2001)
- J. D. C. Goddard (2002)
- The Three Ws of West Indian Cricket: A Comparative Batting Analysis (2002; with Arjun Tan)
- 25 Years of Pride and Industry: The Barbados Association of Winnipeg, Inc., 1977–2002 (2002)
- Caribbean Millennium Project: Impact of Caribbean Immigration on the Development of Manitoba 1950–2002 (2002)
- Sonny Ramadhin (2003)
- 75 Years of West Indies Cricket: 1928–2003 (2004; with Ray Goble)
- Roy Edwin Marshall (2005)
- Alfred Lewis Valentine (2006)
- Cricket at Kensington, 1895–2005 (2006; with Carlisle Burton)
- A Black Studies Primer: Heroes and Heroines of the African Diaspora (2008)
- Some Barbadian-Canadians: A Biographical Dictionary (2010; editor-in-chief)

His books on the West Indian cricketers Weekes, Walcott, Worrell, Sobers, Hall, Goddard, Ramadhin, Marshall and Valentine are short volumes in the Famous Cricketers series published by The Association of Cricket Statisticians and Historians.
