= West Indian cricket team in England in 1906 =

International cricket tour

- Part of 1906 English cricket season
- Date: 11 June 1906 – 18 August 1906
- Location: United Kingdom
- Result: No representative matches played
Teams
Captains
Most runs
Most wickets

The West Indies cricket team toured England in the 1906 season. The team played 19 matches between 11 June and 18 August 1906 of which 13 were regarded as first-class.

A somewhat more formal selection process seems to have been followed than for the 1900 tour but the team was still selected by representatives from Barbados, British Guiana and Trinidad. The team was perhaps a little stronger than that of 1900 but two tours to the West Indies in 1901-02 and 1904-05 had shown again that the combined West Indies team was of quite a modest standard compared to English first-class counties. Despite this the same mistake was made as in 1900 and an overly ambitious tour programme was arranged. This included 19 matches, mostly against first-class counties. As in 1900 they suffered a series of heavy defeats early on but later in the tour had some success, particularly in heavily defeating Yorkshire. The first-class teams fielded somewhat weakened sides to make the matches more competitive but the early defeats had again limited public interest.

Sydney Smith was the star all-rounder of the team in the early matches but he later lost form, especially his batting. He was particularly effective against the minor teams. Richard Ollivierre and Oliver Layne also performed as useful all-rounders. Percy Goodman, Bertie Harragin, Lebrun Constantine, George Challenor and Harold Austin all batted well on occasions. Harragin missed a number of matches through injury. Austin was perhaps a disappointment. As in 1900 the Jamaican players did little.

Tommie Burton left the tour early. No reason for this is given in contemporary publications but it is reported that his tour "ended in acrimony when he was sent home after refusing to carry out menial duties for white members of the side.

== Touring team ==
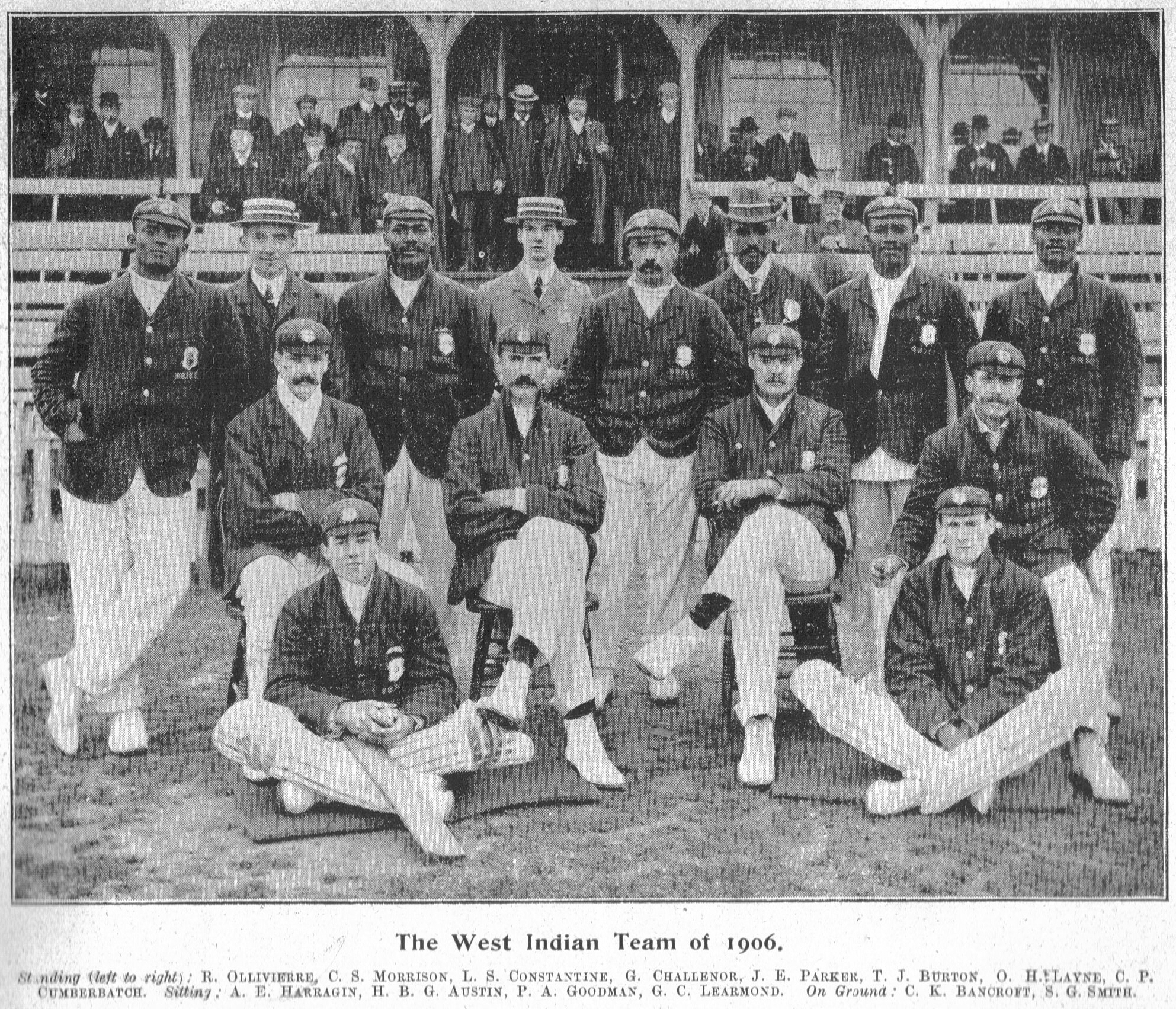
1906 West Indies Team

Since the first tour to England in the summer of 1900 there had been two further tours by English teams to the West Indies. These were the tours captained by Richard Bennett in 1901–02 and by Lord Brackley in 1904–05. The selection of the West Indies team took place after the 1905–06 Inter-Colonial Tournament in January 1906. The team was selected by two representatives from each of the three competing colonies; Jamaica, Grenada and St. Vincent being unrepresented. Charles Ollivierre was now playing for Derbyshire and so was unavailable.

The 15 players that made up the team consisted of:

Name	
H.B.G. Austin (c)	Barbados
C.K. Bancroft	Barbados
W.T. Burton	British Guiana
Dr. J.J. Cameron	Jamaica
G. Challenor	Barbados
L.S. Constantine	Trinidad
A.B. Cumberbatch	Trinidad
P.A. Goodman	Barbados
A.E.A. Harragin	Trinidad
O.H. Layne	Barbados
G.C. Learmond	Trinidad
C.S. Morrison	Jamaica
R.C. Ollivierre	St. Vincent
J.E. Parker	British Guiana
S.G. Smith	Trinidad

Burton, Constantine, Goodman and Learmond had been part of the 1900 team. Richard Ollivierre was the brother of Charles Ollivierre who had toured in 1900.

R.H. Mallett was the manager. Austin was elected as captain while Goodman and Harragin were chosen for the selection committee.

The majority of the team was white. The Professionals Burton, Cumberbatch and Layne were black as were Constantine and Ollivierre amongst the Amateurs.

Strangely Cumberbatch was invariably reported in contemporary publications as being "C. P. Cumberbatch" whereas it appears that he was actually "A.B. Cumberbatch", C. P. Cumberbatch being a different player.

== Preliminaries ==
13 of the team departed from Barbados aboard RMS "Trent" on 22 May arriving in Southampton on 4 June via Cherbourg. Bancroft and Cameron were already in England. Mr Mallet met the team at Southampton.

In England the team stayed initially at the Manchester Hotel, Aldersgate Street, London. The team practised at Lord's and played a number of preliminary matches, some arranged by WG Grace.

== Matches ==
=== Status ===
Of the 19 matches 6 were not regarded as first-class. These were the matches against Lord Brackley's XI, Minor Counties XI, Wiltshire, South Wales, Northumberland and Durham, and Norfolk. These are shown in italics below.

=== Match 1 v W.G. Grace's XI ===
11, 12 June

W.G. Grace's XI {{{score1}}}	Vs	West Indians {{{score2}}}

Lost by 247 runs
Crystal Palace

By a strange coincidence this match started on exactly the same day and date as the 1900 tour, i.e. Monday 11 June. The home team was styled W.G. Grace's XI rather than London County, mainly because London County had lost its first-class status at this time. The tourists left out Cameron, Morrison, Ollivierre and Parker.

W.G. Grace's team won the toss and batted. The highlight of their innings was 105 by Albert Lawton out of 193 in 85 minutes, adding 150 for the fourth wicket with Edward Sewell in 70 minutes, the whole innings lasting just 3 1/2 hours. When they batted the West Indians did badly and were 87/6 at the close. Only Lebrun Constantine with 89 avoided complete disaster. Batting fourth he was ninth out and his runs were made out of 124 and came in just 95 minutes and scoring 60 of the 66 runs scored for the last four wickets.

W.G. Grace did not enforce the follow-on and Archie Cumberbatch and Oliver Layne took a number of early wickets and reduced Grace's team to 53/7. However the tail added good runs with William Murch making a useful 53. Layne ending up with 6/74. Getting 376 for victory was never on but the tourists disappointed with 128 having been 7/38 at one stage. Bertie Harragin top scored with 50 made in 30 minutes with 5 6s, 4 4s and 2 2s, including 3 6s in one over from WG. The match was finished inside two days.

=== Match 2 v Essex ===
14, 15, 16 June

Essex {{{score1}}}	Vs	West Indians {{{score2}}}

Lost by 111 runs
Leyton

Ollivierre and Parker replaced Burton and Challenor. Essex won the toss, batted and made 226 on a cold day. Left-handed New Zealander Dan Reese top scored with 70 out of 178 in 140 minutes. When they batted the tourists did well with Oliver Layne making 106 in 3 hours, Harold Austin 74 in 2 1/2 hours and Bertie Harragin 51 in 40 minutes to give the West Indians a first innings lead of 153. Austin and Harragin added 151 for the fourth wicket in 125 minutes.

Batting again Essex did much better with Percy Perrin and Charlie McGahey scoring well and at the end of the second day they were 212/2, Perrin and McGahey adding 136 in the last 90 minutes of play. The tourists took a number of quick wickets early on the third day but a partnership of 95 for the last wicket in 50 minutes left them a target of 243. Only Sydney Smith with 46* scored many runs and they fell 111 runs short.

=== Match 3 v Lord Brackley's West Indian XI ===
18, 19, 20 June

West Indians {{{score1}}}	Vs	Lord Brackley's XI {{{score2}}}

Lost by 2 wickets
Lord's

This match was ruled not first-class by the M.C.C. Lord Brackley's team consisted of 11 of those who had toured the West Indies with him in the 1904–05 season. Hayes was playing in a county match and was unavailable. Burton, Challenor and Morrison replaced Cumberbatch, Goodman and Parker.

Batting first the West Indies did badly and were dismissed for 158 with George Simpson-Hayward taking 7/37 with his lobs. Richard Ollivierre was top score with 41 in 50 minutes. Teddy Wynyard scored a rapid 76 in the reply of 213 with Charles Morrison taking 5/58.

Second time round the tourists started badly and were 99/6. A useful partnership of 149 in 80 minutes for the seventh wicket between Harold Austin and Bertie Harragin enabled them to set Lord Brackley's XI a target of 244. Harragin made 86 in 90 minutes. When the home side batted Morrison took quick wickets and the score was 80/4 at the close. Wynyard, who had opened in the first innings, batted down the order because of injury and used a runner. He was again the top scorer with 70* in 125 minutes and led the team to an exciting two wicket victory. Ollivierre was no-balled when, seeing Wynyard out of his ground, he threw at the stumps in an attempt to run him out.

=== Match 4 v Minor Counties XI ===
21, 22, 23 June

West Indians {{{score1}}}	Vs	Minor Counties XI {{{score2}}}

Won by 215 runs
Ealing

Cumberbatch, Goodman and Parker replaced Austin, Bancroft and Burton. Goodman captained the side, won the toss and batted first, Ollivierre kept wicket in Bancroft's absence. The tourists made a disappointing score of just 204 with Bertie Harragin scoring 68 out of 94 in 65 minutes. The Minor Counties got within 12 runs of the West Indian score with 62 in 88 minutes from William Coleman from Hertfordshire the top scorer.

The second time around the tourists did much better. Sydney Smith with 93 and Harragin with 63 adding 130 runs for the fifth wicket in 80 minutes. Set a target of 351 the Minor Counties were quickly 11/3 and never got close. Smith took 5/45 to go with his 4/86 in the first innings and his scored of 23 and 93.

After the match Harragin attempted to beat his West Indian record for throwing the cricket ball. However he only reached 124 yards 2 feet 10 inches compared to his record of 128 yards 4 inches.

=== Match 5 v Surrey ===
25, 26 June

Surrey {{{score1}}}	Vs	West Indians {{{score2}}}

Lost by 10 wickets
The Oval

Austin, Bancroft and Burton replaced Cumberbatch, Goodman and Learmond. Surrey batted first and reached 174/2 at lunchtime. When 6 wickets were down Keith Bancroft dislocated a finger and Richard Ollivierre replaced him as wicket-keeper. Oliver Layne ended up with 7/76. The tourists did badly when they batted and were 103/8 at the end of the first day.

On the second morning the West Indians followed-on and were quickly 57/4. Bertie Harragin and Harold Austin then added 90 in 65 minutes. Harragin's innings of 57 lasted 75 minutes. The tourists were headed for an innings defeat but a ninth wicket stand of 48 in 30 minutes between Lebrun Constantine and Tommie Burton enabled them to set a target of 47. In the match 5 of the West Indian batsmen were run out. The match ended a day early.

After the match Harragin made another attempt at throwing the cricket ball. This time he reached only 119 yards 2 feet.

=== Match 6 v Wiltshire ===
29, 30 June

Wiltshire {{{score1}}}	Vs	West Indians {{{score2}}}

Lost by 86 runs
Swindon

Cameron, Cumberbatch, Goodman and Learmond replaced Bancroft, Constantine, Morrison and Parker. Ollivierre kept wicket. This was Cameron's first match of the tour and was to be Burton's last. Wiltshire won the toss and batted. This was a 2-day match.

Rain prevented play until after 2:30 on the first day. Wiltshire scored 233 with Arthur Newman scoring 72 with 4 6s. Sydney Smith took 8/93. In reply the West Indians were dismissed for 149 with Smith top scorer with 52 and William Overton taking 5/58.

A draw looked likely but the pitch was ruined by rain and the tourists lost by 86 runs. Smith took 4/46 in the second Wiltshire innings and with 26 was top scorer again in the West Indians second innings. Ollivierre, who had kept wicket for most of the match, took 4/5 in 2.4 overs, all bowled. The West Indians started their innings with only 90 minutes remaining but were dismissed 4 minutes before the end of the match.

=== Match 7 v Hampshire ===
2, 3, 4 July

West Indians {{{score1}}}	Vs	Hampshire {{{score2}}}

Lost by 6 wickets
Southampton

Bancroft, Constantine and Morrison replaced Burton, Layne and Learmond. Batting first the tourists made a disappointing score of just 166, Sydney Smith again top score with 48 adding 84 with Percy Goodman in 75 minutes. William Langford took 8/82. Charlie Llewellyn with 60 and Phil Mead with 132 added 124 for the third wicket. At the close of play Hampshire were in a commanding position at 235/3. Mead was eventually out after an innings lasting 170 minutes and Hampshire had a first innings lead of 183.

The West Indians batted better second time around. Richard Ollivierre made 67 and Smith again excelled with 100, the pair adding 100 for the fifth wicket in 55 minutes. Ollivierre hit in splendid fashion. Set 111 Hampshire were 61/4 but made the target comfortably. Smith took 4/53 and 7 wickets in the match.

=== Match 8 v South Wales ===
9, 10 July

West Indians {{{score1}}}	Vs	South Wales {{{score2}}}

Won by 278 runs
Cardiff

Parker replaced Harragin. The South Wales side consisted of players from Glamorgan and Monmouthshire. The game was virtually won on the first day when the West Indians won the toss, scored 324 and had the South Wales team at 93/6. The tourists were 23/4 but Sydney Smith again batted well scoring 140* in 145 minutes. He added 126 with Lebrun Constantine in 65 minutes and then 110 with Richard Ollivierre in 70 minutes.

Smith wrapped up the tail on the second morning and ended with figures of 5/28. The tourists made 176 when they batted again and set the South Wales team an impossible target of 399. Only Alec Thackeray batted well scoring 59 in 35 minutes. Smith took 4/36.

Smith had been top scorer and leading wicket taker for the West Indians in each of the last three matches. He had had a run of being top scorer in 5 consecutive innings. At this stage of the tour he had scored over 700 runs at an average approaching 60 and taken over 50 wickets at an average of under 20 in just 8 matches, 4 first-class and 4 not.

=== Match 9 v Kent ===
12, 13 July

Kent {{{score1}}}	Vs	West Indians {{{score2}}}

Lost by an innings and 14 runs
Catford

Harragin and Learmond replaced Cameron and Parker. The Kent innings of 471 lasted just 4 hours and 40 minutes. Arthur Day scored 82 out of 155 in 90 minutes while Frank Woolley scored 77 out of 122 in 45 minutes. Only Richard Ollivierre was at all effective with 7/144. The tourists were 15/0 at the close.

Most of the tourists got to double figures but they only reached a total 248, Colin Blythe taking 7/86. Keith Bancroft top scored with 53 in 90 minutes. Following-on Harold Austin and Bertie Harragin added 79 for the second wicket in 55 minutes but thereafter wickets fell at regular innings and they fell 14 runs short of making Kent bat again. Harragin sustained a leg injury which forced him miss a number of matches. The match finished a day early.

=== Match 10 v M.C.C. ===
16, 17 July

West Indians {{{score1}}}	Vs	M.C.C. {{{score2}}}

Lost by 6 wickets
Lord's

Morrison replaced the injured Harragin. The M.C.C. team was captained by Plum Warner, a native of Trinidad and included Edward Challenor, an elder brother of George Challenor who was playing occasionally for Leicestershire and who was born in Barbados. Batting first lost wickets regularly although George Challenor made 59 in 80 minutes the tourists were 136/7 at lunchtime. After lunch Archie Cumberbatch scored a rapid 59* in 65 minutes enabling the total to reach 240. The M.C.C. were 89/6 but then Warner and Charles Veal added 80 in 45 minutes and then Gerry Weigall added 75 with Warner in 50 minutes and the M.C.C. gained a first innings lead of 29. Sydney Smith took 5/78.

The tourists were 73/3 at lunch on the second day but afterwards they collapsed before Bert Vogler, the South African googly bowler, who ended up with 9/44, the other batsman being run out. He had not bowled in the innings until the score was 35/0. Set just 87 the M.C.C. made the runs easily. The game finished a day early again.

=== Match 11 v Derbyshire ===
19, 20, 21 July

West Indians {{{score1}}}	Vs	Derbyshire {{{score2}}}

Lost by 6 wickets
Derby

Cameron and Layne replaced Bancroft and Parker, Ollivierre keeping wicket. Derbyshire's team included Charles Ollivierre, Richard's brother, who had toured with the West Indies in 1900. Batting first the tourists made 233 with Percy Goodman scoring 81* out of 142 in 140 minutes. Derbyshire reached 105/3 by the close. On the second day they reached 217, 16 short of the West Indian total.

Batted again the West Indians were 62/4 but Oliver Layne scored 63 in 115 minutes added useful runs with Richard Ollivierre and Harold Austin. Derbyshire had 2 overs at the end of the second day. Set 259 Derbyshire Charles Ollivierre and Ernest Needham, the England footballer, added 123 in 65 minutes. Maynard Ashcroft who had retired earlier with a fly in his eye returned and saw Derbyshire to a 6 wickets victory with Ollivierre.

=== Match 12 v Scotland ===
23, 24, 25 July

Scotland {{{score1}}}	Vs	West Indians {{{score2}}}

Won by 4 wickets
Edinburgh

Bancroft replaced Cameron. Play was delayed until after lunch and when they batted Scotland only managed 147 and by the end of the first day the West Indies were 109/4, Lebrun Constantine scoring a rapid 68 in 50 minutes and adding 87 with Oliver Layne. The tourists were heading for a small lead but a last wicket stand of 72 between Harold Austin and George Learmond gave then a lead of 102.

Scotland fared badly when they batted again and were 45/3. A stand of 78 between Maurice Dickson and Charles Mannes saw then to 155/4 at the close of the second day. Dickson was bowled by Richard Ollivierre but the bails took several seconds to fall and he was given not out by the umpire. He eventually took his score to 81 on the third day and the tourists were set a target of 203. George Challenor with 90 scored out of 148 lead the West Indians to a 6 wicket victory.

=== Match 13 v An England XI ===
26, 27, 28 July

West Indians {{{score1}}}	Vs	An England XI {{{score2}}}

Drawn
Blackpool

This was in the nature of a festival match, the England XI being referred to as a "scratch eleven". Cameron and Parker replaced Goodman and Learmond. Constantine kept wicket even though Bancroft was playing. Fifty-nine-year-old Monkey Hornby was the original captain of the England XI. However he got lumbago and was replaced by Albert Peatfield early on the second day. Even though he was a substitute Peatfield was allowed to bat. This was his only first-class match.

Winning the toss the tourists batted and made 201 with Lebrun Constantine top scorer with 54 in 70 minutes. In reply the England XI made just 138. On the second day the West Indians scored 158 with Constantine again top scorer with 51, Sam Hargreave taking 7/49. The England XI reached 40/0 by the close. Most of the last day was lost to rain and the match was drawn. Willie Quaife and Arthur Day added 20 in 10 minutes at one stage.

=== Match 14 v Northumberland and Durham ===
30, 31 July, 1 August

West Indians {{{score1}}}	Vs	Northumberland/Durham {{{score2}}}

Won by 145 runs
Sunderland

Goodman and Learmond replaced Cameron and Morrison, Bancroft kept wicket. George Challenor played an excellent innings of 97 in the first innings. George Turnbull, who never played a first-class game taking 8/110. In reply the combined team was 102/8 at the close.

Play did not start until 4pm on the second day because of rain. Set 237 on the third day the batting of combined team proved disappointing. In the match Sydney Smith scored 41 and 32 and took 6/56 and 5/49.

=== Match 15 v Yorkshire ===
2, 3, 4 August

West Indians {{{score1}}}	Vs	Yorkshire {{{score2}}}

Won by 262 runs
Harrogate

Cameron replaced Learmond. West Indies won the toss, batted first and scored 270, Lebrun Constantine 79 and Oliver Layne 63 adding 117 for the second wicket in 70 minutes. When they batted Yorkshire were sensationally dismissed for 50 in 80 minutes with Richard Ollivierre 7/23 and Sydney Smith 3/27 bowling unchanged.

They did not enforce the follow-on on the second morning. George Challenor and Constantine added 69 for the first wicket in 35 minutes, Layne scored another half century and Percy Goodman 102* out of 173 in 90 minutes before the declaration at 4pm, setting Yorkshire a target of 525. Yorkshire reached 114/4 in 100 minutes by the close of the second day. David Denton, 42* overnight, reached 112* but the team fell well short of their target. Ollivierre took 4 more wickets to add to his 7 in the first innings. This was certainly the best result of the tour.

=== Match 16 v Leicestershire ===
6, 7, 8 August

Leicestershire {{{score1}}}	Vs	West Indians {{{score2}}}

Lost by 24 runs
Leicester

Learmond and Morrison replaced Cameron and Parker. Leicestershire won the toss batted and were soon 41/4 but Harry Whitehead and Samuel Coe added 83 in an hour and the home side eventually reached 274. In reply George Challenor and Lebrun Constantine scored 86 in 50 minutes and the tourists reached 124/2 at the close of play. Constantine eventually scored 92 in 110 minutes adding 79 in an hour with Sydney Smith. The rest added little and the tourists ended up 32 short on the first innings. William Odell took 6/60.

Leicestershire made a bad start to their second innings and were 105/6. Coe and Vivian Crawford, who scored 51, then added 64 in 30 minutes. Coe was then joined by Richard Crawford and added 51 more and then Coe and Thomas Jayes added 46 more before the close of play, leaving them in a strong position 299 ahead. Coe eventually fell for 86 made in 150 minutes and the tourists were left to make 351. Challenor and Constantine again gave the West Indians a good start adding 116 for the first wicket. Smith, Percy Goodman and Harold Austin all added useful runs and at 241/4 a surprise win looked possible. Wickets then fell regularly and they ended up 24 runs short.

=== Match 17 v Norfolk ===
10, 11 August

West Indians {{{score1}}}	Vs	Norfolk {{{score2}}}

Won by an innings and 118 runs
Norwich

Harragin and Parker replaced Bancroft and Morrison. Learmond and Constantine kept wicket. Batting first the tourists made a useful total of 375. George Challenor made 37, Lebrun Constantine 41, Oliver Layne 62, Percy Goodman 88, Harold Austin 32 and Richard Ollivierre 42.

Ollivierre and Layne had Norfolk in trouble and they were bowled out for 91. Following-on they did a little better but Layne and Sydney Smith this time did the damage. Basil Cozens-Hardy top scored with 48. In the match Ollivierre took 3/42, Layne 9/89 and Smith 7/90.

=== Match 18 v Nottinghamshire ===
13, 14, 15 August

Nottinghamshire {{{score1}}}	Vs	West Indians {{{score2}}}

Drawn
Trent Bridge

Cameron and Morrison replaced Learmond and Parker. Constantine and Ollivierre kept wicket. Only 3 1/2 hours play was possible on the first day during which time Nottinghamshire reached 254/5. James Iremonger and Wilfred Payton added 123 in 80 minutes for the third wicket. Payton eventually fell for 113 in 135 minutes. The remaining wickets fell in 55 minutes on the second morning. The tourists started badly being 2/3 in the first over. Sydney Smith scored 43 but it was left to Bertie Harragin with 26 to avoid the follow-on. Thomas Wass took 5/89.

When they batted again John Gunn scored 112 out of the innings total of 180 scored in 130 minutes, reaching his century in two hours. Left with nearly four hours to get 328 the West Indians started well with George Challenor and Oliver Layne scoring 129 for the first wicket. Challenor eventually made 108 and a useful stand between Harragin 43* and Archie Cumberbatch 13* saw out time. Albert Hallam took 9 wickets in the match.

=== Match 19 Northamptonshire ===
16, 17, 18 August

West Indians {{{score1}}}	Vs	Northamptonshire {{{score2}}}

Won by 155 runs
Northampton

George Challenor and Lebrun Constantine added 60 in 50 minutes giving the tourists a good start. Wickets then fell and it was left to Percy Goodman with 107 and Richard Ollivierre with 50 to enable the total to reach 297 made in 220 minutes. Goodman's innings lasted 150 minutes. Northamptonshire were soon in trouble and ended the day on 29/4, Ollivierre and Sydney Smith taking two wickets each. On the second day only George Thompson with 51 did much and the team was dismissed for 85. Smith ended up with 6/39.

The tourists did not enforce the follow-on and were quickly dismissed for 99 by Thompson with 5/47 and William East with 4/45. Scoring 312 to win seemed unlikely but they reached 60/1 at the close of the second day. Ollivierre and Smith again did the damage and the tourists won comfortably by 155 runs. Smith took 6/60 to return match figures of 12/99.

=== Summary ===
Of the 13 first-class matches played, 3 matches were won, 8 were lost and 2 were drawn. In all matches 7 were won, 10 were lost and 2 were drawn.

== Post Tour ==
An additional match was arranged against W.H. Laverton's XI at Oldfields Ground, Uttoxeter on 20 and 21 August. the West Indians scored 268 and 146, W.H. Laverton's XI 154 and 150/6 and the match was drawn. This additional match was played after the tour proper had ended and was not regarded as part of it. A yet further match is noted in which Constantine scored 111 but no other details are given.

The team sailed from England on the RMS "Trent" encountering a storm on the voyage and reached Barbados on 17 September.

Sydney Smith remained in England after the tour to qualify for Northamptonshire.

== General Comments ==
The tour was clearly regarded as disappointing: "There is no getting away from the fact that the programme arranged for them was too ambitious, and they failed to make any strong appeal to the public. Any hope they might have had of attracting attention, was destroyed by the ill-success that attended them in their early fixtures." and "The plain truth is that the players were not good enough to make the English counties feel in the smallest degree apprehensive. Hence the comparative indifference with which the matches were regarded."

Although Bancroft was selected as the wicket-keeper at least 3 other players kept wicket at various times. Ollivierre was clearly a useful keeper but was too valuable as a bowler.

The running between the wickets was still poor and there were a large number of run outs.

The fielding was also regarded as of low standard. "They must, if they wish to succeed, pick the ball up clean."

Some comments were made about the fielding positions used by the tourists. 'Cricket' reports that "The West Indians still arrange their field in a manner which seems curious to Englishmen, and apparently they do not yet realise that a cover-point 50 and 60 yards from the wicket cannot possibly save the single, and can seldom cover enough ground to save the four. Sometimes they have an extra-cover who, while cover stands close in, fields almost behind him at a distance of forty yards or so; but once or twice at Lord's on Monday in the M.C.C. match the ball went through both men, although it was not hit hard enough to reach the boundary. On the same day Challenor sometimes at point and sometimes in a position which is a sort of "third man close in", fielded brilliantly."

== Averages ==
The following averages are for the 13 first-class matches only.

=== Batting ===
Player	P	I	NO	R	HS	Ave	100	50	C/S
PA Goodman	11	22	3	607	107	31.94	2	1	15
AEA Harragin	7	14	1	412	57	31.69	–	4	5
LS Constantine	13	26	0	776	92	29.84	–	7	18/4
G Challenor	12	24	0	684	108	28.50	1	4	3
SG Smith	13	26	3	571	100	24.82	1	–	8
OH Layne	10	20	0	465	106	23.25	1	3	5
HBG Austin	13	26	1	529	74	21.16	–	3	2
RC Ollivierre	12	24	0	480	67	20.00	–	2	12/2
WT Burton	2	4	2	32	19	16.00	–	–	3
CK Bancroft	11	22	5	266	53	15.64	–	1	11/5
GC Learmond	7	13	1	155	31	12.91	–	–	4
AB Cumberbatch	12	22	3	223	59*	11.73	–	1	20
CS Morrison	10	18	7	72	13	6.54	–	–	4
JE Parker	5	9	1	49	15	6.12	–	–	3
JJ Cameron	5	8	2	33	12	5.50	–	–	2

In all 19 matches SG Smith was leading run scorer with 1107. LS Constantine with 1025 and G Challenor with 1017 also reached 1000 runs.

=== Bowling ===
Player	O	M	R	W	BB	Ave	5i	10m
RC Ollivierre	331.2	41	1251	58	7/23	21.56	2	1
OH Layne	261.3	39	819	34	7/76	24.08	2	-
SG Smith	492.3	72	1608	66	6/39	24.36	3	1
CS Morrison	121.2	26	371	14	4/94	26.50	–	-
PA Goodman	63	4	232	8	2/9	29.00	–	-
AB Cumberbatch	191.5	31	719	24	4/39	29.95	–	-
WT Burton	40.1	5	125	3	3/85	41.66	–	-
JE Parker	49	5	182	4	2/28	45.50	–	-
LS Constantine	2	0	14	0				
JJ Cameron	3	0	18	0				

Ollivierre bowled 3 wides, Smith 2 no balls and 12 wides, Morrison 2 no balls, Cumberbatch 3 wides, Parker 2 wides.

In all 19 matches SG Smith took 116 wickets. RC Ollivierre was second highest wicket taker with 71.

== Annual reviews ==
- Wisden Cricketers' Almanack 1907 (pages 440 to 462)
