= Queen's Park Oval =

Cricket stadium in Trinidad and Tobago

Coordinates: 10°40′2.59″N 61°31′25.32″W

- The Oval
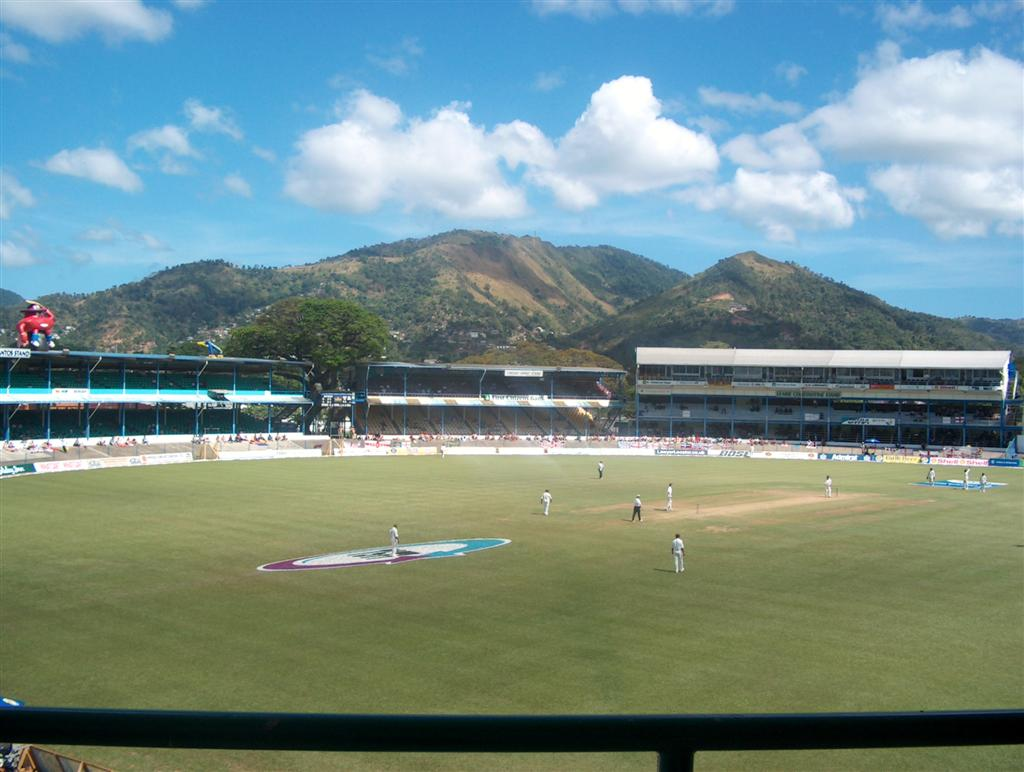
- Interactive map of Queen's Park Oval

Ground information
- Location: Port of Spain, Trinidad and Tobago
- Country: West Indies
- Establishment: 1896
- Capacity: 20,000
- Owner: Queen's Park Cricket Club
- End names
- Brian Lara Pavilion End; Media Centre End

International information
- First men's Test: 1–6 February 1930: West Indies v England
- Last men's Test: 7–11 August 2024: West Indies v South Africa
- First men's ODI: 9 March 1983: West Indies v India
- Last men's ODI: 27 July 2022: West Indies v India
- First men's T20I: 15 March 2009: West Indies v England
- Last men's T20I: 2 April 2017: West Indies v Pakistan
- First women's ODI: 18 March 2003: West Indies v Sri Lanka
- Last women's ODI: 3 November 2013: West Indies v England
- First women's T20I: 6 May 2012: West Indies v Sri Lanka
- Last women's T20I: 9 May 2012: West Indies v Sri Lanka

Team information
Trinidad and Tobago	(1896 – present)
Trinbago Knight Riders	(2013 – present)
- As of 7 August 2024; Source: Cricinfo

The Queen's Park Oval is a sports stadium in Port of Spain, Trinidad and Tobago, used mostly for cricket matches. It opened in 1896. Privately owned by the Queen's Park Cricket Club, it is currently the second largest capacity cricket ground in the West Indies with seating for about 20,000 spectators.

It has hosted more Test matches than any other ground in the Caribbean with 60 as of January 2018, and has also hosted a number of One-Day International (ODI) matches, including many World Series Cricket games in 1979, and matches of the 2007 Cricket World Cup. The Trinidad and Tobago cricket team play most of their home matches at the ground, and it is the home ground of the Caribbean Premier League team Trinbago Knight Riders.

Considered by many players, journalists and critics as one of the most picturesque cricket venues, the ground first hosted a Test match in February 1930 when England toured the Caribbean, though it had previously hosted many first class tours as early as the 1897 tour under Lord Hawke. The pavilion dates back to 1896, though there were extensive renovations in the 1950s and in 2007, prior to the World Cup and following an earthquake. The "Concrete Stand" was renamed the "Learie Constantine Stand" in recognition of that former West Indies cricketer. The first ODI match at the ground was in March 1983, and the first Twenty20 International in 2009.

As well as the main cricket stadium, the facility includes a gym, indoor and outdoor cricket practice nets, two squash courts and two outdoor tennis courts. The cricket field has also been used to host several domestic and international football matches, and several music events.

== Cricketing history ==
=== Early years ===
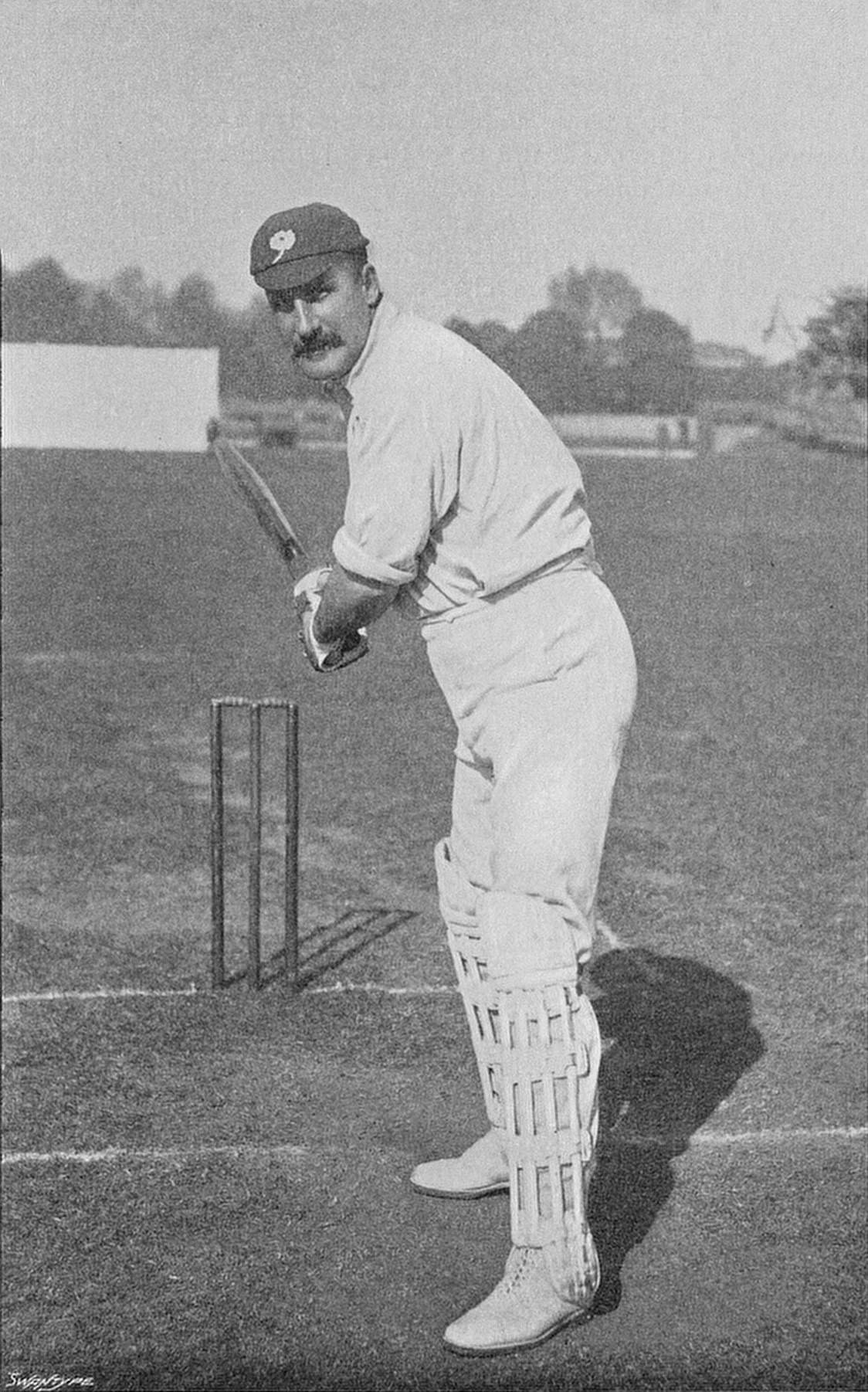
Lord Hawke, who led the earliest first-class tours to the ground.

The Queen's Park Oval Cricket Club leased the Queen's Park Oval in 1896, moving there from its first home at the Queen's Park Savannah, where it had existed since its founding in 1891. The natural soil at the ground prevented turf wickets from being laid down, due to the damage caused by the mole crickets that inhabited it so, when the club moved to its new ground, the groundsmen laid a pitch of clay with a wicket made of matting laid on top. A popular venue due to its capacity (7,000 when first constructed, the highest in the Caribbean) the ground was very profitable for the owning cricket club. The first match recorded by CricketArchive, CricInfo and Wisden took place on 29 January 1897, between Lord Hawke's touring party and a team put out by the Queen's Park Oval Club. The match, which was a draw but saw the ground's first century—119 by Plum Warner—was not counted as first-class. Only a few days later on February 1 the ground's maiden first-class fixture took place between Trinidad and the same Lord Hawke's XI. The home team won by 137 runs. The two teams met at the Oval again on 5 February, when Trinidad were victorious once more. Arthur Priestley's touring eleven then played a Queen's Park XI on February 12, with the game drawn.

During the first decades of the 20th century, the private Queen's Park Oval was a very exclusive cricket ground and club. C. L. R. James records that "they were for the most part white and often wealthy" and that "a black man in the Queen's Park was rare and usually anonymous." The Queen's Park club was "the big shot" of the local cricket on the island, and touring matches were the mainstay of cricket at the ground for the first few years. They also contributed to the growth of cricket on the island, for trial matches were held on weekends while a tour was in progress, and local talent was invited to play. In April 1899, Trinidad played a Barbados-based XI led by Arthur St. Hill, an early domestic West Indian fixture. By 1900, Inter-Colonial Tournament matches were taking place, with the final between Barbados and British Guiana taking place at the Queen's Park Oval. These became more and more frequent in the first decade of the 20th century, along with more tour games against the invitational XIs of Richard Bennett and Lord Brackley. The ground hosted the finals of the 1906 and 1910 Inter-Colonial Tournaments.

In 1911 and in 1913, the Marylebone Cricket Club (MCC) toured the West Indies, with four matches played in total between the MCC and Trinidad at the Queen's Park Oval across both tours. Then, on 20 February 1913, the MCC played a combined West Indies cricket team, who was playing one of its earliest matches as a representative eleven, and only its fourth against an MCC side. Harry Ince scored 167 in the West Indian first innings, Richard Ollivierre took a five-wicket haul and Joseph Rogers took a six-for as the MCC slid to a heavy defeat. The match was the first between the West Indies and the MCC to have taken place at the Queen's Park Oval. Though cricket was largely interrupted by World War I, normal practice resumed with the ground hosting the Inter-Colonial Tournament finals in 1921, 1925 and 1929.

=== Test matches ===
On 1 February 1930, the Queen's Park Oval hosted its first Test match. The second Test of the MCC 1929–30 tour of the West Indies saw England, under Les Ames, defeat the West Indies under Errol Hunte, thanks largely to a century by the England captain and a double-century by Patsy Hendren. The ground also hosted the Second Test of the 1935 tour, which started on 24 January. The match saw the West Indies record its first Test match victory at the ground, defeating Bob Wyatt's England by 217 runs. Between the Tests, the ground had also hosted several of the first-class matches played during the tour, as well as continuing to host matches in the Inter-Colonial Tournament, including the 1935 and 1937 finals.

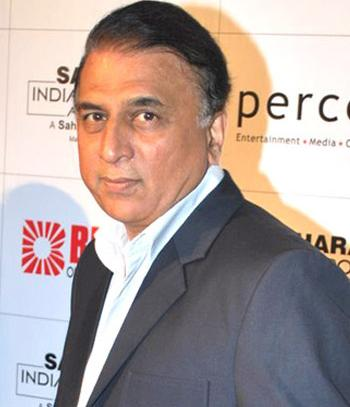
Sunil Gavaskar of India, the most successful century-maker in Test matches at the Queen's Park Oval, with the most hundreds (4) and the highest score (220).

The outbreak of World War II halted Test cricket at the ground after the 1935 tour, but domestic cricket continued. 1939 was the last year of the Inter-Colonial Tournament and, throughout the war years, the Queen's Park Oval hosted several first-class games between Trinidad and either Barbados or British Guiana.

International cricket did not return to the Queen's Park Oval until 1947 when the MCC toured and played Trinidad twice at the ground in the lead-up to the first post-war Test, played at the Queen's Park Oval on 11 February 1948. England drew with the West Indies, captained by Clyde Walcott, despite centuries from both West Indian openers. In 1952, the original pavilion was replaced with a two-tier structure as part of an extensive renovation of the ground. In 1953 India toured the West Indies and played the First and Third Tests at the ground. On 17 May 1954, the Oval then hosted England once more and the home team scored 681/8d, which remains the highest team score at the ground. Everton Weekes scored 206 of the runs, the second of two double centuries scored by him at the Oval, following a knock of 207 during the aforementioned tour by India. This was the final match played on the clay surface with matting laid on top.

From then on, turf wickets were prepared in an attempt to balance batting and bowling at the venue. More advanced techniques were introduced and a new pitch laid in 1955. Later that year, the ground hosted the second Test of an Australian tour. Pakistan came in 1957, followed by England two years later. On 28 January 1960, during the latter tour, England faced the West Indies at the Oval. Batting in front of a 30,000-strong home crowd on the third day, the West Indies fell from 22 for no loss to 98/8. The crowd began to throw bottles onto the pitch, some ran on to the field, and general disorder spread until the game had to be halted. Wisden called the match one of the "most dramatic Test matches for many years" and labelled the disorder "unfortunate" and "remarkable", noting that the situation "became so bad that a riot developed." Officials of the ground and the West Indies team had to apologise to the MCC, as had the Governor of Trinidad, Eric Williams and Learie Constantine. The match resumed and England went on to victory, and took the series 1:0. India returned to the West Indies 1961 and played two further Tests at the Oval.

The Beaumont Cup competition was held at the Queen's Park Oval from 1958 onwards and, from 1964, the Regional Four Day Competition also began, with the ground hosting Trinidad home games for both competitions. Australia returned to the ground in 1965 for the Second and Fifth Tests of the tour. The latter saw a heavy West Indian defeat. However, across the series they were victorious 2–1 in what Wisden called the "series for the unofficial championship of the world."

The West Indian first-class domestic tournament, renamed the Shell Shield, continued at the ground in the winter of 1965. England under Colin Cowdrey returned in January 1968 and a generous declaration by Gary Sobers allowed England to win and level the series. That was followed by a tour by India in 1971. India were victorious, the first time they had ever been against the West Indies in the Caribbean. The score of 220 made by Indian Sunil Gavaskar at the Queen's Park Oval during the Test match there remains the highest score made by any player at the ground. Gavaskar would go on to make a total of four centuries at the ground, the most by any player. The bowling analysis of 9/95 by West Indian Jack Noreiga was also made during the same tour and remains the best bowling analysis at the Queen's Park Oval. New Zealand returned that winter, followed by an Australian tour over the winter of 1972–73.

=== West Indian ascendency ===
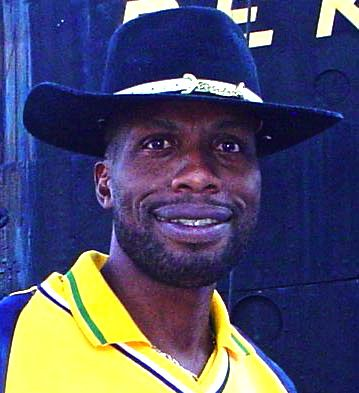
Sir Curtly Ambrose holds the record for the most wickets taken at the Queen's Park Oval, sixty-six.

The West Indians had begun to experience difficulties in the final years of the 1960s. The Indian defeat had come on the back of defeats away to Australia and England. Though they played well against Australia on the 1972–73 tour, they lost 2:1. In the Fourth Test in Guyana they fell to a 10-wicket defeat after being dismissed for 109 in their second innings. The utilisation of aggressive fast bowlers such as Dennis Lillee and Jeff Thomson had inspired West Indian captain to bring into his team men of similar virtues. In the 1976 Indian tour of the West Indies, the Queen's Park Oval hosted the Second and Third Tests. The West Indians played Andy Roberts and Michael Holding in both games, though India played well enough to draw the first and win the second of these fixtures. Their victory in the second involved a record 406-run fourth innings to chase the West Indies total down.

Meanwhile, in domestic cricket, the Beaumont Cup had been renamed the Texaco Cup, and both it and the Shell Shield continued to feature at the Queen's Park Oval. The first one-day cricket matches had begun in the West Indies, and the Queen's Park Oval hosted its inaugural Gillette Cup match between Trinidad and Tobago and the Windward Islands in February 1976. Several of these games would be hosted at the ground each season.

Pakistan toured the West Indies in 1977, by which time the hosts were becoming a major force in world cricket. For the next decade the team would win 40 and lose only six Tests. The Second and Fourth Tests of the 1977 Pakistan tour were both at the Queen's Park Oval, and the West Indians comfortable took the former thanks to 8/29 by pacer Colin Croft, supported by Roberts and Joel Garner. Further success came in 1978 when two Tests against Australia at the ground both saw heavy West Indian victories. The First Test of the series saw Australia routed for 90 in their first innings by Garner, Croft and Roberts and a defeat to the hosts by an innings and 106 runs. A six-wicket-haul by Vanburn Holder in the Fourth Test of the series, also at the Queen's Park Oval, ensured another West Indian victory. With World Series Cricket (WSC) commencing a West Indies tour in 1979, the third "Supertest" was held at the Queen's Park Oval. With centuries from Bruce Laird and Greg Chappell, the Australian WSC team secured victory.

In 1981 the Queen's Park Oval hosted England and saw West Indian victory by an innings, followed by a draw against India in 1982. The first One-Day International at the ground took place between India and the West Indies in March 1983, with the hosts taking a comfortable victory. Australia, New Zealand and England all visited the ground for Test and ODI games during 1985 and 1986, faring poorly. The decade ended with tours by Pakistan and India, mixed with matches from the now entitled Red Stripe Cup, the new name for the West Indian domestic first-class competition.

Following a return by Pakistan in 1992, England toured the West Indies over the winter of 1993–94. The teams met March 25 at the Queen's Park Oval and England were reduced to 46 all-out by Curtly Ambrose. It remains the lowest total made in a Test match at the ground, and with 66 wickets Ambrose remains the most successful bowler there.

=== West Indian decline, 2007 World Cup ===
By the late 1990s the West Indian team had begun to decline. It was defeated by Australia in a 1994–95 series, the Third Test of which was played at the Queen's Park Oval, as were two of the ODI matches. The ground hosted two Tests of the 1997–98 tour by England, the second of which in February saw the West Indies defeated by England. The West Indian captain during the match, Brian Lara, went on to be the leading run scorer at the Queen's Park Oval in ODI matches, as well as hold record for the highest score made there. The West Indies lost heavily again to Australia at the ground in 1999, by a margin of 312 runs. The retirement of Ambrose and Courtney Walsh in 2001 further hampered West Indian efforts, and they were defeated at the Queen's Park Oval by South Africa in March, and India in August 2001. They were likewise defeated in ODI matches at the ground by both sides. The West Indies dropped to eighth in the Test rankings, with another heavy loss at the Queen's Park Oval against England in 2004, amid complaints about the quality of the pitch from England players. The West Indies also suffered at the hands of South Africa during ODI matches played at the ground.

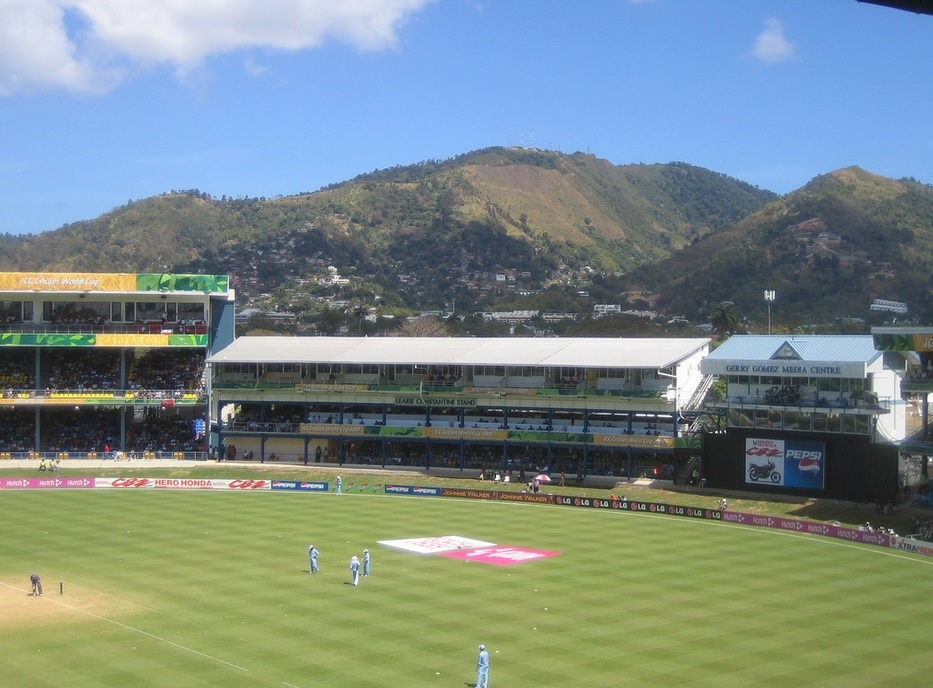
Two stands and the media centre and the Oval, prior to the 2007 renovations.

The West Indies were chosen as hosts for the 2007 Cricket World Cup, with the Queen's Park Oval selected as one of the venues. Renovation work commenced immediately to prepare the ground for the matches. These, however, suffered drawbacks. Labour shortages hampered the efforts of the construction workers. Two new stands at the Queen's Park Oval were constructed for the event. Initially the International Cricket Council expressed concerns that the ground would not be ready in time, with Development Director Don Lockerbie stating that "the ante had to be upped." An earthquake in late February that measured 5.1 on the Richter magnitude scale caused damaged to the fledgling stands. Work which had due to be completed by December 2006 dragged into the spring of the following year, with opening matches of the competition due to start in March. Nevertheless, the new pavilion was unveiled in time for the matches. The ground was celebrated as "the only venue in the West Indies, and one of four in the world to host more than 50 Test matches and 51 ODIs" during a ceremony to open the new stands. Once the tournament had gotten underway, several Group B matches were played at the Queen's Park Oval between teams such as Bermuda, India, Bangladesh and Sri Lanka. These matches included a score of 413/5 by India against Bermuda on March 19, which remains the highest total made in an ODI at the Queen's Park Oval. None of the final stage games were played at the ground, with the Super Eight stages all being played at either the Providence Stadium or the Sir Vivian Richards Stadium.

=== Post-World Cup years ===
==== Tests ====
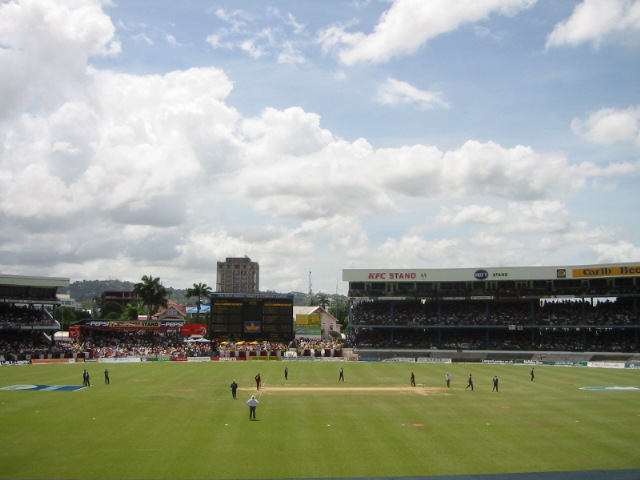
Stands and the scoreboard at the Oval in 2004.

Following the end of the World Cup, the Queen's Park Oval has had a sporadic allotment of international cricket. Since 2007 there has been six test matches the most recent of which was the infamous washed out match held in August 2016 against India. That match was notable for the third shortest non-abandoned test ever, with the match being curtailed by a wet outfield which allowed for only twenty two overs to be bowled over the five days despite rain not falling for the majority of the match.

Test matches were not allocated to the ground for 2010, 2011, 2013, 2015 and 2017 which prompted a reaction from Trinidad and Tobago Cricket Association President Azim Bassarath, who stated that "we in T&T need to have Test matches here so that our young and developing players can get a taste of the best form of the game.". In 2010 due to the arrest of Christopher "Dudus" Coke and subsequent social unrest and deteriorating security situation in Kingston, Jamaica the 1st South Africa/West Indies test match that was initially allotted to Sabina Park was relocated to Trinidad.

==== ODIs ====
In the years following the 2007 World Cup the Queen's Park Oval has had a sporadic allotment of ODIs, with no matches being played there in 2009, 2012, 2014, 2015 and 2016. The ground last hosted ODIs in June 2017 when two matches against India were played there. In that period of time the ground did host its first Twenty20 International, against England as a one-off match. The hosts defeated England comfortably thanks largely to a score of 59 from 46 balls by Ramnaresh Sarwan, which leaves him to date the highest scorer and most prolific run-maker at the ground in T20 Internationals. The ground hosted another Twenty20 International against Zimbabwe in February 2010 and against India in 2011. No Twenty20 Internationals has been played since.

==== Domestic Cricket ====
The ground hosts domestic First Class, List A and T20 matches, of the Trinidad and Tobago Red Force National Team. With the advent of a new title sponsor for the West Indies domestic 50 over competition, Trinidad and Tobago was chosen as the venue for all matches for a three-year period from 2014 to 2016 and the ground has hosted these matches.

The formation of the Caribbean Premier League has given the QPO a new tenant - The Trinidad and Tobago Red Steel and the ground has hosted Red Steel league matches in each of the three seasons as well as the semifinals and finals of the 2013 and 2015 editions of the CPL. For the 2016 CPL season the QPO will host home matches for the Trinbago Knight Riders who replaced the Red Steel in the tournament when the ownership changed.

== Facilities and pitch ==
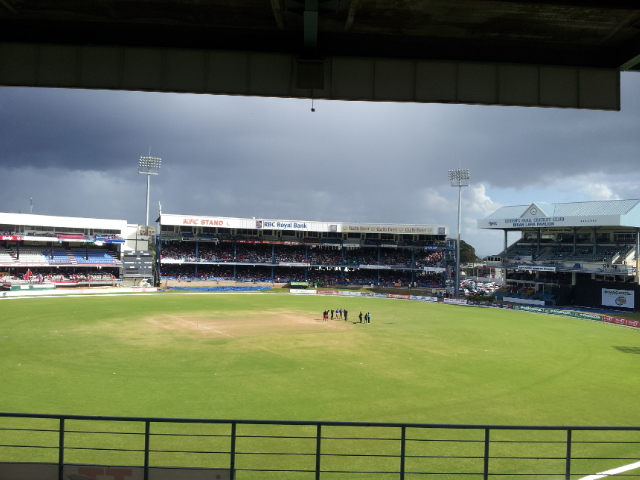
Queens Park Oval looking eastward towards the Brian Lara Pavilion, Carib Stand and Trini Posse Stand - Trinidad and Tobago vs Barbados Regional 50 overs game

In preparation for the 2007 World Cup there were significant renovations that took place at the Oval with the provision of several new facilities and buildings, as well as upgrades to existing infrastructure. According to a CricInfo review of the new ground on the eve of the World Cup, it featured a "library and museum space on the ground floor, as well as a top class health, spa, gymnasium and restaurant facilities, and an entertainment centre with satellite TV and other comforts." The ground has a crowd capacity of around 18,000 and day/night cricket is supported by the presence of floodlights, hosted on 6 towers around the ground.

The structures at the Oval include the "Learie Constantine Stand", known in particular for its jovial crowds, the Trini Posse Stand which is located perpendicular to the pitch, the Carib/KFC/RBC Stand, the Brian Lara Pavilion, the latter named for the West Indian batsman, the CL Duprey/Republic Bank stand, the Scotia Bank/BG Stand, the Jeffrey Stollmeyer Stand and the Gerry Gomez Media Centre, the last two of which has been named for former cricketers. There was a structure called the Dos Santos Stand which was demolished in 2012 due to health and safety considerations with it suffering structural decay and weakening steel. No replacement has been constructed, significantly reducing the existing capacity of the stadium.

The pitch has two ends, the Pavilion End and Media Centre End. The Media Centre End was renamed in 2011 to the Willie Rodriguez End in honour of the former Queen's Park and Trinidad and Tobago player. Natural turf was used in the early years however Mole crickets caused too much damage on the original pitch which was laid directly onto the natural soil, so soon after the ground was purchased a pitch of clay was laid over a wicket made of coir matting. A 1932 study into cricket pitches ruled that clay pitches lacking in calcium carbonate were ideal for cricket play. However, the Queen's Park Oval clay surface was disproportionately suited to batting. A score of 681/8d in 1954, and double-centuries by Everton Weekes in consecutive series during that same year, prompted the laying of a turf wicket in 1955 in an attempt to balance batting and bowling. Five 20-metre-wide and 26-metre-long pitches were dug, each with a depth of one meter.

The work was supported by a second study in 1962, made in Australia, which argued that such turf wickets were more likely to lead to balanced cricket games. Between the Oval's inaugural Test and January 1954, the overall batting average at the ground was 37.03, and it dropped to 28.07 between the installation of the new pitch and the year 2000. Even the new pitch was, however, according to a 1982 report, "well known of its peculiar playing characteristics." It crumbled during matches, giving more help to spin bowlers. Australian Test bowler Ashley Mallett believed that the new pitch was certainly more helpful to spin bowling, while England captain Nasser Hussain was negative about batting on the pitch during the 2004 England tour in his biography Playing With Fire. In 2012 the pitch was described by the media during the Australian tour as "slightly damp, tacky appearance" after rain, and then "tinder-dry."

== Records ==
=== Test matches ===
==== Batting ====
- Highest total: 681/8d by the West Indies against England, 17 May 1954.
- Lowest total: 46 all out by England against the West Indies, 25 March 1994.
- Most runs: 1,212 by West Indian Rohan Kanhai.
- Highest score: 220 by Indian Sunil Gavaskar, 13 April 1971.
- Most centuries: 4, by Indian Sunil Gavaskar, http://stats.espncricinfo.com/ci/engine/player/28794.html?class=1;ground=208;host=4;template=results;type=batting;view=innings

==== Bowling ====
- Most wickets: 66 by West Indian Curtly Ambrose.
- Best bowling figures (innings): 9/95, by West Indian Jack Noreiga.
- Best bowling figures (match): 13/132, by South African Makhaya Ntini.

=== One-Day Internationals ===
==== Batting ====
- Highest total: 413/5 by India against Bermuda, 19 March 2007.
- Lowest total: 75 by Canada against Zimbabwe, 16 May 2006.
- Most runs: 1,276 by West Indian Brian Lara.
- Highest score: 146* by West Indian Brian Lara.
- Most centuries: 3, by Indian Virat Kohli.

==== Bowling ====
- Most wickets: 24 by West Indian Curtly Ambrose.
- Best bowling figures (innings): 6/25 by New Zealander Scott Styris.

=== Twenty20 Internationals ===
==== Batting ====
- Highest total: 159/6 by India against the West Indies, 4 June 2011.
- Lowest total: 79/7 by the West Indies against Zimbabwe, 28 February 2010.
- Most runs: 111 by West Indian Marlon Samuels on 20 July 2009.
- Highest score: 91 by West Indian Evin Lewis on 1 April 2017.

==== Bowling ====
- Most wickets: 10 by West Indian Darren Sammy.
- Best bowling figures (innings): 5/26 by West Indian Darren Sammy.

=== Local Art ===
Around the exterior walls of the Oval (also known as The Wall Project) are large sized prints of works by artists who paint in different medium, such as oil and watercolor. These prints have been placed on the exterior the walls since around 1985 and display abstract works, cultural and nature inspired scenes. Over time, some of the works which have been displayed have been changed to accommodate either a new artist or a new piece of art.

==== Nelson Mandela Park ====
To the side of the Nelson Mandela Park which is closest to Serpentine Road are three pieces of art which have been placed there by Digicel after the pieces were selected as the winning pieces of the competition launched to commemorate the 100th anniversary of the founding of the City of Port of Spain.
