= History of cricket in the West Indies from 1918–19 to 1945 =

This article describes the history of cricket in the West Indies from 1919 to 1945.

== Inter-Colonial Tournament ==
The 1891–92 season had seen the first Inter-Colonial Tournament in the West Indies and these took place irregularly until the Second World War, winners in the inter-war period being:

- 1922-23 – Barbados
- 1923-24 – Barbados
- 1924-25 – Trinidad and Tobago
- 1925-26 – Trinidad and Tobago
- 1926-27 – Barbados
- 1928-29 – Trinidad and Tobago
- 1929-30 – British Guiana
- 1931-32 – Trinidad and Tobago
- 1933-34 – Trinidad and Tobago
- 1934-35 – British Guiana
- 1935-36 – British Guiana
- 1936-37 – Trinidad and Tobago
- 1937-38 – British Guiana
- 1938-39 – Trinidad and Tobago

After the war, there was no inter-country competition until the foundation of the Shell Shield in 1965, though the teams played occasional matches against each other in the intervening period.

== English tours of the West Indies ==
Between the two World Wars, various English teams toured the West Indies. The 1929–30 team was the first to play Test cricket in the West Indies. West Indies was already capable of competing at the highest level with players like George Headley and Learie Constantine.

=== England 1929-30 ===
- 1st Test at Kensington Oval, Bridgetown, Barbados – match drawn
- 2nd Test at Queen's Park Oval, Port of Spain, Trinidad – England won by 167 runs
- 3rd Test at Bourda, Georgetown – West Indies won by 289 runs
- 4th Test at Sabina Park, Kingston – match drawn

=== England 1934-35 ===
- 1st Test at Kensington Oval, Bridgetown, Barbados – England won by 4 wickets
- 2nd Test at Queen's Park Oval, Port of Spain, Trinidad – West Indies won by 217 runs
- 3rd Test at Bourda, Georgetown – match drawn
- 4th Test at Sabina Park, Kingston – West Indies won by an innings and 161 runs

== External sources ==
- CricketArchive – itinerary of events
- Indian Cricket Official Partner
