= Lord Brackley's cricket team in the West Indies in 1904–05 =

International cricket tour

Lord Brackley's XI was the fifth team of English cricketers to tour the West Indies, playing in the 1904–05 season. The team was captained by John Egerton, 4th Earl of Ellesmere (Lord Brackley) and played a total of 20 matches between January and April 1905, of which ten are regarded as first-class.

== The team ==
For the first time on a tour of the West Indies, professionals were taken: Ernie Hayes of Surrey and George Thompson of Northamptonshire.

Thirteen players toured:

- Lord Brackley, Captain
- Clive Burn
- Terence Cole
- George Drummond
- Charles Ebden
- Cyril Foley
- Hesketh Hesketh-Prichard
- Horatio Powys-Keck
- George Simpson-Hayward
- Arthur Somerset senior
- Teddy Wynyard
- Ernie Hayes
- George Thompson

John Moss was taken as umpire and also played in some minor matches. None of the players had been in the earlier touring sides to the West Indies. The inclusion of the two professionals considerably strengthened the team. Thompson had played for Northamptonshire in 1904, their last season as a minor county. He was, however, well up to first class standard. The amateurs were of mixed standard, including a number of useful players like Simpson-Hayward, Somerset and Wynyard together with a number of borderline first class standard including the captain himself. G. Bellamy accompanied the team as scorer and played in a first class match against Jamaica. S. Beton played in a minor match.

== The tour ==
- 12, 13 January : v Jamaica
- 14, 16 January : v XVIII of Jamaica, odds match 12 v 18
- 17 January : v Jamaica Garrison, 12-a-side
- 19, 20, 21 January: v Jamaica
- 31 January, 1–2 February : v Barbados
- 3, 4 February : v XVIII of Barbados, odds match 12 v 18
- 6, 7, 8 February: v West Indies at Kensington Oval, Bridgetown, Barbados. Lord Brackley's XI 353 defeated West Indies 107 and 229 by an innings and 17 runs. Wynyard scored 101; Thompson took 6 for 38 and 5 for 63.
- 8, 9, 10 February: v Barbados
- 15, 16 February : v St. Lucia
- 17, 18 February : v Garrison XI (in St. Lucia)
- 20, 21 February : v St. Lucia
- 27 February : v Barbados Garrison
- 2, 3, 4 March v : British Guiana
- 6, 7, 8 March v : British Guiana
- 14, 15, 16 March : v St. Vincent
- 17, 18 March : v St. Vincent
- 21, 22, 23 March : v Queens' Park (in Trinidad)
- 25, 27, 28 March v : Trinidad
- 31 March, 1, 3, 4 April v : West Indies at Queen's Park Oval, Port of Spain, Trinidad. Lord Brackley's XI 181 and 147 defeated West Indies 170 and 154 by 4 runs. Lebrun Constantine was the highest scorer, with 35 and 56; Thompson took 5 for 67 and 2 for 62.
- 4, 5, 6 April v : Trinidad

First-class matches are highlighted.

Of the 10 first-class matches, 6 were won, 3 lost and 1 drawn. Overall 11 matches were won, 3 lost and 6 drawn. The first matches of the tour were in Jamaica rather than Barbados as had happened on previous tours. The tourists were lucky to draw the first match against Jamaica but the next week won heavily by an innings and 169 runs. The tourists lost the second match against Barbados and then twice to Trinidad. Both match against the combined XI were won. A number of the minor matches were drawn but the tourists did win by an innings in all their matches in St. Lucia with the home team never scoring more than 102 in any innings. St. Vincent took the first innings lead in both their games but both matches were drawn.

Although in their mid to late 40s Wynyard and Somerset were highly successful batsmen supported well by Hayes. Other batsmen performed well in the minor matches but were less successful in the important games. Thompson was the mainstay of the bowling taking 75 first class wickets and 126 in all matches. Hayes and Simpson-Hayward also made useful contributions with the ball.

== Averages ==
The following averages are in the 10 first-class matches

=== Batting ===
Player	P	I	NO	R	HS	Ave	100	50	C/S
Teddy Wynyard	8	14	0	562	157	40.14	2	2	9/1
Arthur Somerset	9	15	5	326	68*	32.60	-	3	10/3
Ernie Hayes	9	16	1	425	100*	28.33	2	1	8
Charles Ebden	10	18	0	384	78	21.33	-	2	7
Terence Cole	10	17	2	295	68	19.66	-	3	5
George Simpson-Hayward	9	16	0	312	67	19.50	-	1	11
George Thompson	10	17	1	274	37	17.12	-	-	3
Lord Brackley	9	16	3	191	34	14.69	-	-	6/1
Cyril Foley	10	17	0	239	58	14.05	-	1	1
George Drummond	6	11	0	110	34	10.00	-	-	1
Clive Burn	9	15	3	107	23	8.91	-	-	5
Hesketh Hesketh-Prichard	5	9	1	65	37	8.12	-	-	-
Horatio Powys-Keck	5	8	3	37	25*	7.40	-	-	-
G Bellamy	1	1	1	0	0*		-	-	1

=== Bowling ===
Player	O	M	R	W	BB	Ave	5i	10m
Ernie Hayes	121.2	25	325	26	3-16	12.50	-	-
George Thompson	353.5	81	1048	75	7-65	13.97	10	2
George Simpson-Hayward	182.5	25	564	32	5-29	17.62	1	-
Horatio Powys-Keck	67.2	11	233	12	4-24	19.41	-	-
Hesketh Hesketh-Prichard	101.4	18	311	14	5-49	22.21	1	-
Clive Burn	144.5	37	349	14	4-1	24.92	-	-
G Bellamy	2	0	20	0				
Teddy Wynyard	5	0	28	0				

== Return match ==
When the West Indians toured England in 1906 they played a match against Lord Brackley's XI at Lord's. Lord Brackley's XI, all of whom had toured in 1904–05, won the three-day match by two wickets.

== Annual reviews ==
- Wisden Cricketers' Almanack 1906, pages 514 to 534
