= Stanley Sproston =

West Indian cricketer

- Stanley Sproston in 1900

Personal information
- Full name: Stanley Winfield Sproston
- Born: 9 November 1872; Linden, Demerara, British Guiana
- Died: 16 July 1930 (aged 57); West Indies
- Batting: Right-handed
- Bowling: Right-arm fast-medium
- Relatives: Harvey Sproston (brother)

Domestic team information
- Years: Team
- 1895/96–1899/1900: British Guiana
- 1894/95–1897/98: Demerara

Career statistics
Competition	First-class
Matches	13
Runs scored	562
Batting average	26.76
100s/50s	–/3
Top score	95
Balls bowled	360
Wickets	12
Bowling average	17.58
5 wickets in innings	–
10 wickets in match	–
Best bowling	4/5
Catches/stumpings	13/–
- Source: CricketArchive, 14 October 2011

Stanley Winfield Sproston (9 November 1872 – 16 July 1930) was a West Indian first-class cricketer who toured with the first West Indian touring side to England in 1900 and captained the side for much of the tour in the absence of Aucher Warner.

Born in Wismer, Linden, East Bank, Demerara, British Guiana, Sproston made his debut in important matches for British Guiana against Slade Lucas's team in 1894-95. The next season, he made his debut in the Inter-Colonial Tournament for British Guiana scoring 27 and 52 and taking a 4-5 in 4.1 overs against Trinidad. Early in the 1896-97 season he impressed again with 75* and 32 against Jamaica.

Later in 1896-97, he was selected to play for the combined West Indies team against Priestley's side and then played in the three matches for British Guiana against Lord Hawke's team scoring a career high 95.

He was described before the 1900 tour as "Twenty four (sic) years of age. Very good bat, combining sound defence with punishing power; a useful change bowler, and a good field anywhere. Has no superior as a batsman in the West Indies. Learned his cricket in England. Played for Richmond (Surrey), Eastbourne, and Teddington. Played during the 1898 season, scoring 101 runs for Richmond against Upper Tooting, and 110 for Teddington against Hampshire. The average for G.C.C. last season was 45.21". On the tour he was fifth in the batting averages at 22.22 but bowled just 12 overs. He was "a little disappointing, and not consistent in his scoring, but when he did get runs he made them brilliantly. His form at Worcester, Southampton and Liverpool was up to a high standard". He top scored in both innings against Worcester scoring 54 and 46, scored 86 against Hampshire, and 118 against Liverpool and District. He captained the side in the 10 matches when Aucher Warner was absent with malarial fever. He never played again in important matches after the tour.

Sproston died on 16 July 1930, aged 57, in the West Indies. His brother Harvey Sproston also played for British Guiana.
