= Lionel D'Ade =

West Indian cricketer

Lionel Smythe D'Ade (c. 1875 in Trinidad – unknown) was a West Indian cricketer who toured with the first West Indian touring side to England in 1900.

== Biography ==
He made his debut in important matches for Trinidad against British Guiana in the 1895-96 Inter-Colonial Tournament. In 1896-97 he played for Trinidad against both Lord Hawke's team and Priestley's side as well as representing the combined West Indies against Priestley's XI. He impressed with 55 against Lord Hawke and then 140* against Priestley, an innings in which he went in at 7-1 and took the score from 148-8 and 178-9 to 284 all out with help from Float Woods and Stephen Rudder.

He was described before the 1900 tour as "Not now up to his usual form; steady bat and good field". However he "did little or nothing until the very end of the tour". He played just twice in the first ten games scoring only 10 runs. His one substantial innings was 68* in the very last match against Norfolk.

Returning from the 1900 tour to England he played a number of matches for Trinidad and was chosen for the combined West Indies team against Bennett's side in 1901-02 but scored just 0 and 9. His final first class matches were for Trinidad against a weak Jamaica side in 1905. He was never able to repeat the impressive performances of 1896-97.
