= Percy Cox (cricketer) =

West Indian cricketer

Percy Ince Cox (16 September 1878 at the Foster Hall Plantation, Saint Joseph, Barbados – 1918 at Princes Town, Trinidad) was a West Indian cricketer. He toured with the first West Indian side to England in 1900 aged 21.

He made his debut in important matches playing for Barbados as an 18-year-old against Priestley's side and Lord Hawke's team in 1896-97.

In the 1899-1900 Inter-Colonial Tournament final he scored 70 and 6-39 in the match. Despite this he was originally only selected as a reserve for the 1900 team but gained his place when others dropped out. He was described before the tour as "Twenty-one years of age. Steady bat, fair field, and fair change bowler; member of the Wanderers". He was one of the successes of the tour being 3rd in the batting averages and also took useful wickets. He had useful scores in each of the first three matches against strong opposition. Later in the tour he scored 142 against Surrey and then 5-44 against Liverpool and District. Wisden reported that "Cox bowled well against Derbyshire and Liverpool and District, and was more than once useful as a change. He should develop into a fine all-round cricketer in course of time" and "Cox especially should develop into a really fine batsman, as he is quite young the experience he gained on the tour must in the future be of immense assistance to him".

In 1901 he moved to Trinidad playing for them in the 1900-01 Tournament and then played for the combined West Indies against Bennett's side in 1901-02. He played in all 4 matches against a weak Jamaica side in 1905-06 but had no success and was not selected for the 1906 tour to England.

His elder brothers Hampden and Allan also played for Barbados.
