= George Learmond (cricketer) =

West Indian cricketer (1875–1918)

Personal information
- Full name: George Cyril Learmond
- Born: 4 July 1875; Georgetown, Demerara-Mahaica, British Guiana (now Guyana)
- Died: 2 March 1918 (aged 42); Saint Vincent
- Batting: Right-handed
- Role: Wicket-keeper
- Relatives: Angus Learmond (son); George Camacho (son-in-law); Steve Camacho (grandson)

Domestic team information
- Years: Team
- 1900/01–1910/11: Trinidad
- 1897/98: Demerara
- 1896/97–1899/1900: British Guiana
- 1894/95–1895/96: Barbados

Career statistics
Competition	First-class
Matches	45
Runs scored	1,700
Batting average	22.66
100s/50s	1/10
Top score	120
Balls bowled	100
Wickets	2
Bowling average	34.50
5 wickets in innings	–
10 wickets in match	–
Best bowling	1/4
Catches/stumpings	26/2
- Source: CricketArchive, 14 October 2011

George Cyril Learmond (4 July 1875 – 2 March 1918) was a West Indian cricketer who toured with both of the first two touring sides to England in 1900 and 1906.

== Biography ==
Born on 4 July 1875 in Georgetown, Demerara, British Guiana, Learmond made his debut in important matches for Barbados against Slade Lucas's team in 1894–95 scoring an impressive 86 in his second match. The next season, he made his debut in the Inter-Colonial Tournament for Barbados scoring 59.

From 1896–97 he played for British Guiana making his debut against Jamaica and later that season played against Lord Hawke's team.

He was described before the 1900 tour as "(Demerara) Twenty four years of age. Learned his cricket in Barbados. Splendid bat, rapid run-getter, with sound defence. Good wicket-keeper, and excellent field anywhere. Average for G.C.C. last year, 60.2". However he proved "quite a failure". He scored 52 against the Gentlemen of the M.C.C. at Lord's but ended the tour with a batting average of only 9.10.

Returning from the 1900 tour to England he then played for Trinidad and was chosen for the combined West Indies team against Bennett's side in 1901–02 and Lord Brackley's team in 1904–05 with little success. He made his only first class century for Trinidad against a weak Jamaica side in 1905–06.

George Learmond in 1906

He was again disappointing on the 1906 tour to England averaging just 12.91 in first class matches with a top score of 31 against Scotland. Before the tour he was described as "good bat, fine field, though a comparative failure in the last West Indian Team. If he plays up to his known form will be of great service" and "a splendid bat, who having to keep wicket, failed to do himself justice on the previous tour. He has now cultivated cutting, is a useful slow change bowler and a capital field in the slips".

His final matches were against M.C.C. team of 1910–11. He had played in the Inter-Colonial Tournament on 10 consecutive occasions representing all three teams at various times.

In his first class career of 45 matches he scored 1700 runs at an average of 22.66. Although he performed reasonably well in domestic cricket his performances for the West Indian teams were poor. He died 2 March 1918 in St. Vincent.

His son Angus Learmond and son-in-law George Camacho both played for British Guiana. George's son Steve Camacho played Test cricket for the West Indies.
