= Tommie Burton =

West Indian cricketer (1878–1946)

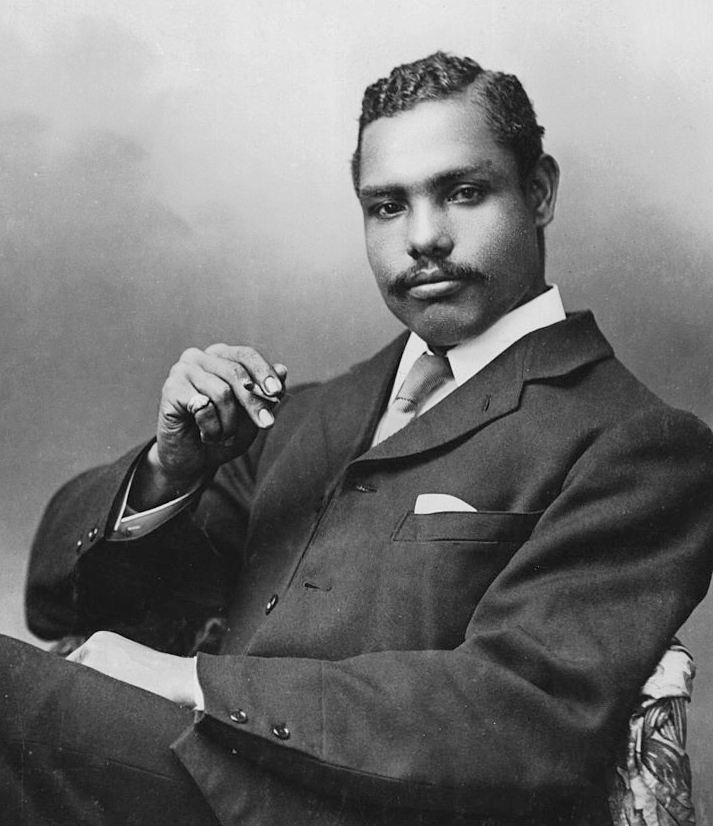
- Burton c. 1910

Personal information
- Full name: William Thomas Burton
- Born: 31 January 1878; St Michael, Barbados
- Died: 22 August 1946 (aged 68); Saint Michael, Barbados
- Batting: Right-handed
- Bowling: Right-arm medium

Domestic team information
- Years: Team
- 1901/02–1904/05: British Guiana

Career statistics
Competition	First-class
Matches	10
Runs scored	161
Batting average	11.50
100s/50s	–/–
Top score	38*
Balls bowled	2,187
Wickets	57
Bowling average	15.03
5 wickets in innings	5
10 wickets in match	3
Best bowling	7/54
Catches/stumpings	14/–
- Source: CricketArchive, 14 October 2011

William Thomas Burton (31 January 1878 – 22 August 1946) was a coloured West Indian first-class cricketer best known as a member of the 1900 and 1906 West Indian tourists to England.

== Career ==
He was the son of a black mother and a white father. He was brought up in Barbados and served for some years there as a practice bowler and in trial matches. Realising that his colour and roots would severely limit his opportunities in Barbados he emigrated to British Guiana in 1899 where there were more chances for coloured cricketers. Even in British Guiana his role as a practice bowler resulted in him being classed as a Professional and hence excluded from the Inter-Colonial Tournament.

He sufficiently impressed in British Guiana to be selected for the 1900 tour to England even though he had not played a single important match. He was described before the tour as "Probably the best bowler in the West Indies, using his head to great advantage. Hard hitting, run-getting bat". On the tour he was second in the bowling averages marginally behind Float Woods and leading wicket taker with 78. He had one good innings of 64* against the Gentlemen of the M.C.C. but otherwise his batting was disappointing. Compared to Woods he was "generally thought in England to be the better bowler of the two. His length was always excellent, and he possessed more finesse and head work than the Trinidad bowler. He sent down a good yorker, and it was with this ball that he twice had the honour of bowling W.G. Though Woods headed him by the merest fraction in the bowling analyses, it was pretty generally admitted that Burton on the whole accomplished the best work".

As noted above his batting was of limited use, scoring 291 runs at an average of 11.64. His innings of 64* against the Gentlemen of the M.C.C. included a 9th wicket stand of 162 in 65 minutes with Lebrun Constantine. He took 5 wickets in an innings 8 times during the tour. The highlight was in the last match against Norfolk when he was unplayable and took 8–9 in 10.4 overs including a spell of 5–0 in 5 overs. With Woods, who took 2–22 in 10 overs, they bowled unchanged and dismissed the county for just 32. In the match against Gloucestershire when Gilbert Jessop scored 157 in an hour, Burton was injured and didn't bowl during Jessop's innings.

Returning from the tour he was selected for the combined West Indies team in all three of their matches against RA Bennett's team in 1901–02 as well as playing in the two British Guiana matches against the tourists. He took 10 wickets in 3 of these 5 matches. His next important matches were against Lord Brackley's team in 1904–05 when he took 15 wickets in the two British Guiana matches and 5 wickets for the combined West Indies team.

He was selected for the 1906 tour to England but played in only 2 first class matches. Before the tour started he was described as "the best professional bowler in the West Indies; can also bat a little" and "a professional who is a fine right hand medium pace bowler with plenty of break and a deceptive flight". He left the tour early. No reason for this is given in contemporary publications but it is reported that his tour "ended in acrimony when he was sent home after refusing to carry out menial duties for white members of the side." The coloured members of the team were expected to perform menial tasks like oiling bats and cleaning boots for the white members of the team. Burton refused to perform these tasks and refusing to apologise he was sent home. The issue seems to have been hushed up since in 1913 the editor of 'Cricket' remarks that "for some reason unknown to me, was dropped after the first few matches".

This ended his cricket career which had consisted of just 10 first class matches in which he took 57 wickets at an average of 15. He was not as fast a bowler as Float Woods or Archie Cumberbatch but was certainly more accurate and used a clever variation of pace. To get employment he had to emigrate to Panama where he worked as a sanitary inspector for 40 years. He deliberately returned to Barbados for his final days.
