= William Bowring (cricketer) =

West Indian cricketer

William Bowring (14 November 1874 at St John's, Newfoundland Colony – 12 August 1945 at Bay, St Michael, Barbados) was a West Indian cricketer who toured with the first West Indian touring side to England in 1900. He was educated at Sherborne and Marlborough and was the only one of the tourists to have learnt his cricket in England.

He first went to the West Indies in late 1898 and his first big matches were for A.B. St Hill's team in 1898-99 and for Barbados in the 1899-1900 Inter-Colonial Tournament but in none of these matches did he have any success.

Despite this he was originally selected as captain of the 1900 tourists. He was eventually replaced in this role by Aucher Warner but agreed to join the side as an ordinary member. He was described before the tour as "Good bat, hard hitter, makes his runs mostly in front of the wicket by hard drives. Has a good forcing stroke off his legs, and plays very hard, especially on the off. A good field, and safe catch. Member of the Wanderers' Club". He was disappointing on the tour and "except for three innings, did nothing". His top score was 63 against Hampshire and he scored 33 and 28 against Warwickshire.

He played for Barbados in the 1901-02 Inter-Colonial Tournament and then over three years later was chosen for the combined West Indies team against Lord Brackley's team in 1904-05 when he scored 5 and was absent hurt in the second innings.

His first class career therefore consisted of 5 matches with a batting average of under 5.
