= Float Woods =

West Indian cricketer (c.1872–??)

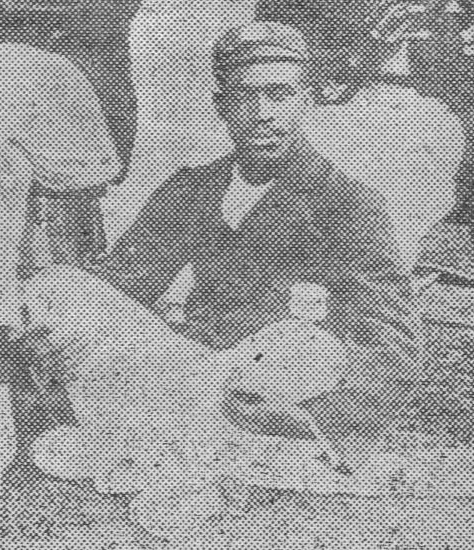
- Float Woods in 1900

Personal information
- Full name: Joseph 'Float' Woods
- Born: c. 1872; Barbados
- Batting: Right-handed
- Bowling: Right-arm fast

Domestic team information
- Years: Team
- 1901/02–1904/05: British Guiana
- 1893/94–1900/01: Trinidad

Career statistics
Competition	First-class
Matches	17
Runs scored	155
Batting average	11.07
100s/50s	–/–
Top score	39
Balls bowled	3,320
Wickets	107
Bowling average	11.57
5 wickets in innings	10
10 wickets in match	2
Best bowling	7/38
Catches/stumpings	10/–
- Source: CricketArchive, 14 October 2011

Joseph 'Float' Woods (born about 1872 in Barbados, death details unknown) was a West Indian cricketer best known as a member of the 1900 West Indian tourists to England. He was of one the first West Indian fast bowlers to gain recognition outside the region.

Apologising for the lack of a photograph, Cricket in 1900 says "that Woods is a fine specimen of the darkest of the coloured natives of the West Indies, that is to say, he is very dark indeed. He has a good figure, which denotes strength in every movement. He is very solidly built, and is of medium height. When his face is in repose one can plainly see that his disposition is phlegmatic, but when it lights up it is full of intelligence. He speaks English accurately but slowly, and as may be imagined he does not make long speeches. His bowling is too well known to need description, and all that need be said about it is that when bowling fast he comes across from the leg, while his slow ball comes in from the off. Although – or perhaps because – he takes a very short run, he makes a pretty big hole in the ground". He took up the game about the age of 15 and was largely self-taught.

The origin of his nickname is something of a mystery although it is reported that "His nickname was Float, after a local delicacy, as an Englishman might be called Chips from fish-and-chips".

As a professional Woods was not eligible to play in the Inter-Colonial Tournament so his chances to play in big matches in the West Indies was very limited. He made his debut for Trinidad against Barbados in 1893–94 in an extra match played after the Tournament. The next season, he played for All Trinidad against Slade Lucas's team, the first English tourists, in their only match against the island. In 1896–97 he played in all four matches for Trinidad against the tourists, twice against Lord Hawke's team and then twice against Priestley's side. Despite taking 19 wickets against Lord Hawke's side he did not play for the combined West Indies against Priestley's XI.

He was selected for the 1900 tour of England and was described before the tour as having "done wonders with the ball against English visiting teams, but doubtful whether he will be effective on good wickets". On the tour he was top in the bowling averages with 72 wickets at an average of 21.54, just ahead of Tommie Burton, the other professional. He was "on occasions up to his best West Indies form, but at other times seemed to lose heart very easily, though it must be confessed he was unlucky in the matter of missed catches".

Asked whether he was as fast as the English fast bowlers he is reported to have said: "I think I am faster than those I have seen. Richardson was, perhaps, the fastest, but he is not as fast as I am now. They tell me he used to be much faster".

By 1902 he was playing for British Guiana. He was selected for the combined West Indies team in all three of their matches against RA Bennett's team in 1901–02 as well as playing for British Guiana. His final first class matches were for British Guiana against Lord Brackley's team in 1904–05 when he took 15 wickets in the two matches.
