= Percy Goodman =

Barbadian cricketer (1874–1935)

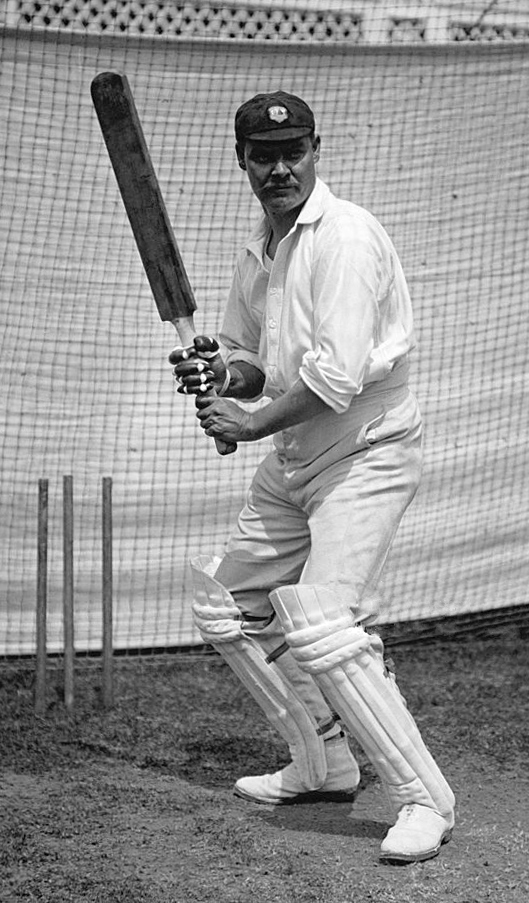

Personal information
- Full name: Percy Arnold Goodman
- Born: 3 October 1874; Sandford, St Philip, Barbados
- Died: 25 April 1935 (aged 60); Elbank, St Lawrence, Christ Church, Barbados
- Batting: Right-handed
- Bowling: Right-arm medium-pace
- Relatives: Clifford Goodman (brother); G. Aubrey Goodman (brother)

Domestic team information
- Years: Team
- 1891-92 to 1912-13: Barbados

Career statistics
Competition	First-class
Matches	40
Runs scored	1824
Batting average	30.91
100s/50s	5/5
Top score	180
Balls bowled
Wickets	88
Bowling average	13.12
5 wickets in innings	5
10 wickets in match	1
Best bowling	7/18
Catches/stumpings	47/–
- Source: Cricinfo, 15 August 2021

Percy Arnold Goodman (3 October 1874 – 25 April 1935) was a Barbadian cricketer who toured with the first two West Indies touring sides to England in 1900 and 1906. He was one of the top West Indian batsmen of his day and was also an effective medium-pace bowler, especially in his younger days. "A big finely-built man, Goodman perhaps carries a little more flesh than a cricketer would elect to bear in a hot climate."

== Life and career ==
Goodman was educated at The Lodge School, Barbados, and made his debut in important matches playing for Barbados as a 16-year-old in the 1891–92 Tournament in Barbados, the precursor of the Inter-Colonial Tournament. He top scored with 74 in the match against Trinidad and in the Tournament took 17 cheap wickets in the 3 matches. In the 1893–94 Tournament match against Trinidad he took 10 wickets in the match for just 31 runs and scored 30 himself in his only innings when still only 18 years old.

His performances against Priestley's side and Lord Hawke's team in 1896–97 and in the Inter-Colonial Tournament led to his selection for 1900 tour. He was described before the 1900 tour as "Twenty-five years of age. Good all-round cricketer, fine field in the slips. Member of the Pickwick Club". On the tour he was fourth in the batting averages at 28.15 but his bowling proved ineffective. He was said to have "a good defence and when a loose ball came along he hit it very hard".

In 1904–05 he was chosen for the combined West Indies team against Lord Brackley's team and then got his maiden first class century with 103 against the tourists for Barbados.

He led the West Indian first-class batting averages in 1906 with 31.94 and scored centuries against Yorkshire and Northamptonshire. As in 1900 his bowling proved ineffective. Before the tour he was described as "another excellent bat, also a good change bowler, field at slip" and "he has a good defence and can hit hard. He makes a pretty cut and uses his wrist well. He can bowl medium pace right hand with a break from leg. A capital slip".

His next important matches were in the 1908–09 Inter-Colonial Tournament when he scored 180, 115 and 16 not out in his three innings. He continued playing until 1912–13, ending his career with a batting average of nearly 31 and a bowling average of just over 13.

His brother Clifford was a successful bowler and his other brothers Aubrey and Evans also played first-class cricket for Barbados.
