= Fitz Hinds =

West Indian cricketer

Personal information
- Full name: Delmont Cameron St Clair Hinds
- Born: June 1, 1880; Westbury Road, St Michael, Barbados
- Nickname: Fitzy Lilly
- Role: all-rounder

Domestic team information
- Years: Team
- 1901/02-1904/05: Barbados
- First-class debut: 10 January 1901 Trinidad v AB St Hill's XI
- Last First-class: 31 March 1905 West Indies v Lord Brackley's XI

Career statistics
Competition	First-class
Matches	12
Runs scored	366
Batting average	20.33
100s/50s	–/1
Top score	55
Balls bowled	987
Wickets	29
Bowling average	15.00
5 wickets in innings	2
10 wickets in match	1
Best bowling	10/36
Catches/stumpings	10/–
- Source: CricketArchive, 8 July 2011

Delmont Cameron St Clair Hinds (born 1 June 1880 at Westbury Road, St Michael, Barbados, details of death unknown) was a West Indian cricketer who toured with the first West Indian touring side to England in 1900. He was known as Fitz Hinds.

He had not played in any big matches before being selected for the 1900 tour and was described before the tour as "Good all-round cricketer, bowls well, with a peculiar action. Member of Spartan [Cricket] Club". On the tour he was sixth in the batting averages at just over 20, but his bowling was ineffective, his 6 wickets costing over 50 runs each. He was "often useful in his peculiar style, and was a keen hard working cricketer".

Returning from England he played for A.B. St Hill's team in 1900-01 and took 10-36 in his first innings against Trinidad in a twelve-a-side match. He eventually made his debut for Barbados in the Inter-Colonial Tournament of 1901-02. He was chosen for the combined West Indies team against Bennett's side in 1901-02 and Lord Brackley's team in 1904-05.

In his 12 match first class career he had a batting average of just over 20 and took useful wickets at an average of 15.

He later emigrated to the United States and in August 1913 he appeared for a 'West Indian Coloured Team' against the 1913 Australian tourists at Celtic Park, Brooklyn, New York City.
