= William Nock =

West Indian cricketer

W. C. Nock, 1900

William Charles Nock (born 1864 in the British West Indies, died 3 February 1909) was a West Indian cricketer who was manager of the first West Indian touring team to England in 1900.

Nock worked in the civil service in Trinidad. He played two first-class matches for Trinidad in 1891–92 with no success: batting at number 11, he made one run in three innings. He was secretary of Queen's Park Cricket Club in Port of Spain from its beginning in 1891. For his work in organising cricket matches as part of the celebrations of Trinidad's centenary in 1897 he was awarded the Silver Centenary Medal. In late 1900 he was appointed Warden of Montserrat, in central Trinidad.
