= Gilbert Livingston =

Gilbert Livingston may refer to:

- Gilbert Livingston (1690–1746), county clerk and member of the New York General Assembly
- Gilbert Livingston (legislator) (1742–1806), lawyer and delegate to the Poughkeepsie Convention
- Gilbert Livingston (cricketer) (1877–?), West Indian cricketer
