= Douglas Wright (cricketer) =

English cricketer and British Army officer

Personal information
- Full name: Douglas Alexander Wright
- Born: 15 March 1894; Georgetown, Demerara, British Guiana
- Died: 1 October 1953 (aged 59); Marylebone, London, England
- Batting: Right-handed
- Role: Wicket-keeper
- Relatives: Edward Fortescue Wright (father); Oswin Wright (brother); Arthur Wright (half–brother)

Domestic team information
- Years: Team
- 1928: Marylebone Cricket Club

Career statistics
Competition	First-class
Matches	5
Runs scored	149
Batting average	29.80
100s/50s	–/1
Top score	82
Catches/stumpings	7/5
- Source: Cricinfo, 31 August 2021

Douglas Alexander Wright (15 March 1894 — 1 October 1953) was an English first-class cricketer and British Army officer.

The son of Edward Fortescue Wright, he was born in March 1894 at Georgetown in British Guiana. He was educated in England at Christ's Hospital. Wright served in the First World War, being commissioned into the Gordon Highlanders as a second lieutenant in October 1914. He was made a temporary lieutenant in December 1916, before later being made an acting captain in June 1918, a rank he was again granted in December 1918, following the conclusion of the war. He later left the British Army and became a tea estate manager in British Ceylon, managing the estate at Wanarajah from 1927 to 1930.

While in Ceylon he played first-class cricket, making his debut for the Europeans cricket team against a touring Marylebone Cricket Club (MCC) side in January 1927 at Colombo. He followed this up with a further first-class appearance against the MCC in February for the Up-Country XI at Darrawella. Wright spent time in England in 1928, where he was selected to play for the MCC against Ireland at Dublin. He scored 82 runs in the MCC's first innings, the second highest score of the innings behind Denis Hill-Wood's 85. Returning to Ceylon, he made a further two first-class appearances. The first came for Dr J Rockwood's Ceylon XI against Maharaj Kumar of Vizianagram's XI at Viharamahadevi Park in Colombo, with the second coming for All-Ceylon against Sir Julien Cahn's XI. A wicket-keeper, Wright scored 149 runs in five first-class matches, at an average of 29.80. Benhind the stumps he took 7 catches and made 5 stumpings. Wright died in England at Marylebone in October 1953. His brother, Oswin, and half–brother, Arthur, both played first-class cricket.
