= Malcolm Kerr (cricketer) =

West Indian cricketer (1877–??)

Malcolm McLeod Kerr (born 28 August 1877 in Spanish Town, St Catherine, Jamaica, death details unknown) was a West Indian cricketer who toured with the first West Indian touring side to England in 1900.

He hadn't played in a single important match before being selected for the 1900 tour. This was largely because so few big matches were played by Jamaica. He had not played against Priestley's side in 1896-97, the last time any team had toured in Jamaica. He was described as "Captain of the Melbourne and member of the Kingston C.C. In 1898-99 he played in 34 matches, 35 innings making 1,087 runs, three times not out, most in an innings 97, average 33.95. during the same season he bowled 144 overs, of which 28 were maidens, 37 wickets, average 9.57.". He proved to be a disappointment and played in only four matches, against Worcestershire, Minor Counties, Staffordshire and Norfolk scoring just 29 runs and not bowling.

He played for Jamaica against Bennett's side in 1901-02, against Lord Brackley's side in 1904-05, against Trinidad in 1905-06 and finally against the Philadelphians in 1908-09. In these matches his batting average was just 11.73 with a top score of 44. He "staggered humanity by taking 6-30 in an innings, 9 for 100 in the match, against the Philadelphians, having scarcely been considered a bowler at all before", his very last match for Jamaica.

His brother Henry also played for Jamaica.
