= Attorney General Goodman =

Attorney General Goodman may refer to:

- G. Aubrey Goodman (1862–1921), Attorney-General of the Straits Settlements
- Meigh Goodman (1847–1928), Attorney General of British Honduras and Hong Kong
