= William Bowring =

William Bowring may refer to:

- Sir William Bowring, 1st Baronet (1837–1916), British shipowner and benefactor
- William Bowring (cricketer) (1874–1945), West Indian cricketer, nephew of Sir William Bowring
