= National Cricket Stadium (Grenada) =

Cricket stadium

Coordinates: 12°3′32.6″N 61°45′7.6″W

Grenada National Cricket Stadium
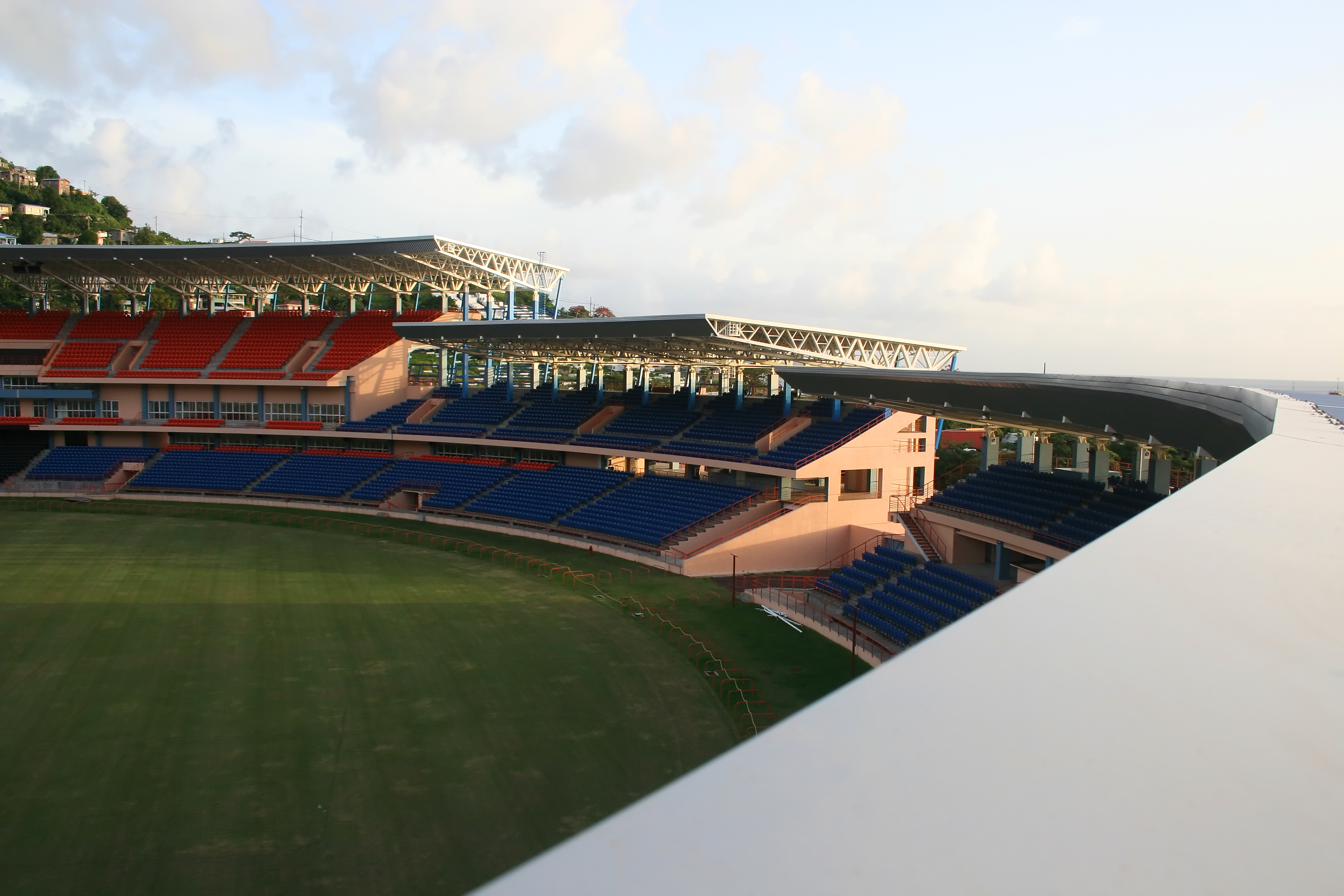
- Interactive map of Grenada National Cricket Stadium

Ground information
- Location: St George's
- Country: Grenada
- Establishment: 1887
- Capacity: 20,000
- Owner: West Indies Cricket Board
- Operator: Windward Islands cricket team
- Tenants: Windward Islands cricket team
- End names
- River End; D'Arbeau End

International information
- First men's Test: 28 June – 02 July 2002: West Indies v New Zealand
- Last men's Test: 3–7 July 2025: West Indies v Australia
- First men's ODI: 14 April 1999: West Indies v Australia
- Last men's ODI: 12 January 2020: West Indies v Ireland
- First men's T20I: 15 January 2020: West Indies v Ireland
- Last men's T20I: 16 December 2023: West Indies v England
- First women's ODI: 20 February 2026: West Indies v Sri Lanka
- Last women's ODI: 25 February 2026: West Indies v Sri Lanka
- First women's T20I: 29 October 2015: West Indies v Pakistan
- Last women's T20I: 1 November 2015: West Indies v Pakistan

Team information
Windward Islands cricket team	(1999–present)
- As of 16 December 2023; Source: Cricinfo

The Grenada National Cricket Stadium, formerly Queen's Park, is a cricket ground on River Road, St George's, the capital of Grenada. A Grenada cricket team is first recorded in West Indies cricket in 1887, playing against a touring Gentlemen of America team at the original Queen's Park ground. Ten years later, Grenada played against Lord Hawke's touring team. Unlike several matches on the tour, that one did not have first-class status. In 1899, G. A. de Freitas and William Mignon became the first Grenada cricketers to play first-class cricket.

The newly rebuilt Queen's Park Stadium became the 84th Test venue in 2002 when it hosted its first match between the West Indies and New Zealand. As of 18 August 2014, two test matches have taken place at the ground. It was one of the locations for the 2007 Cricket World Cup.

After being rebuilt in 2000, the new complex was damaged in September 2004, as a result of Hurricane Ivan.

The oval is noted for being elongated towards the Pavilion end, giving a more baseball type look to the ground. The stadium was funded by the People's Republic of China.

== List of Five Wicket Hauls ==
=== Tests ===
Four five wicket hauls in Test matches have been taken at the venue.

No.	Bowler	Date	Team	Opposing team	Inn	Overs	Runs	Wkts	Econ	Result
1	Shane Bond	28 June 2002	New Zealand	West Indies	2	30.1	104	5	3.44	Drawn
2	Kemar Roach	17 July 2009	West Indies	Bangladesh	2	23.5	48	6	2.01	Lost
3	Shakib Al Hasan	17 July 2009	Bangladesh	West Indies	3	24.5	70	5	2.81	Won
4	Darren Sammy	17 July 2009	West Indies	Bangladesh	4	16	55	5	3.43	Lost

=== One Day Internationals ===
Three five wicket hauls in One-Day Internationals have been taken at the venue.

No.	Bowler	Date	Team	Opposing team	Inn	Overs	Runs	Wkts	Econ	Result
1	Chris Gayle	1 June 2003	West Indies	Australia	1	10	46	5	4.60	Won
2	Dwayne Bravo	24 February 2013	West Indies	Zimbabwe	1	10	43	6	4.30	Won
3	Adil Rashid	27 February 2019	England	West Indies	2	10	85	5	8.50	Won

== See also ==
- 2007 cricket World Cup
- List of Test cricket grounds
