= West Indian cricket team in England in 1900 =

- Part of 1900 English cricket season
- Date: 11 June 1900 – 11 August 1900
- Location: United Kingdom
- Result: No representative matches played
Teams
Captains
Most runs
Most wickets

The West Indies cricket team toured England in the 1900 season. The team played 17 matches between 11 June and 11 August 1900.

There had been three tours by teams of English Amateurs to the West Indies in the mid-1890s and the idea of sending a combined West Indies team to England had gradually developed. Several of the leading West Indies players were unavailable and the team that eventually sailed for England was a little weaker than had been anticipated. Despite the fact that it was known that earlier English touring sides had been of very modest standard, the opponents that were arranged for the 1900 tourists were in general of too high a standard, with 12 of the 17 being of first-class standard. The result was that the West Indians suffered a series of heavy defeats in the early games, a situation not helped by them losing the toss of most occasions. Eventually, because of a combination of the tourists improving and the opponents fielding much weaker sides, the games became much more competitive and by the end of the tour 5 matches had been won compared to 8 losses. The post-tour comments were that the tour had been, "as an experiment", successful. In reality the early defeats had meant that the general interest in the tour was very limited.

Aucher Warner, who was Plum Warner's brother was the official captain of the team but he played in only 7 matches because of Malarial Fever, losing the toss on all 7 occasions. The two black Professionals, Float Woods and Tommie Burton, did much of the bowling. The batting honours were shared with Charles Ollivierre, Lebrun Constantine, Percy Cox and Percy Goodman being the most successful. The lack of a genuine wicket-keeper, the poor running between the wickets and the weakness of the fielding were widely commented on.

== Touring team ==
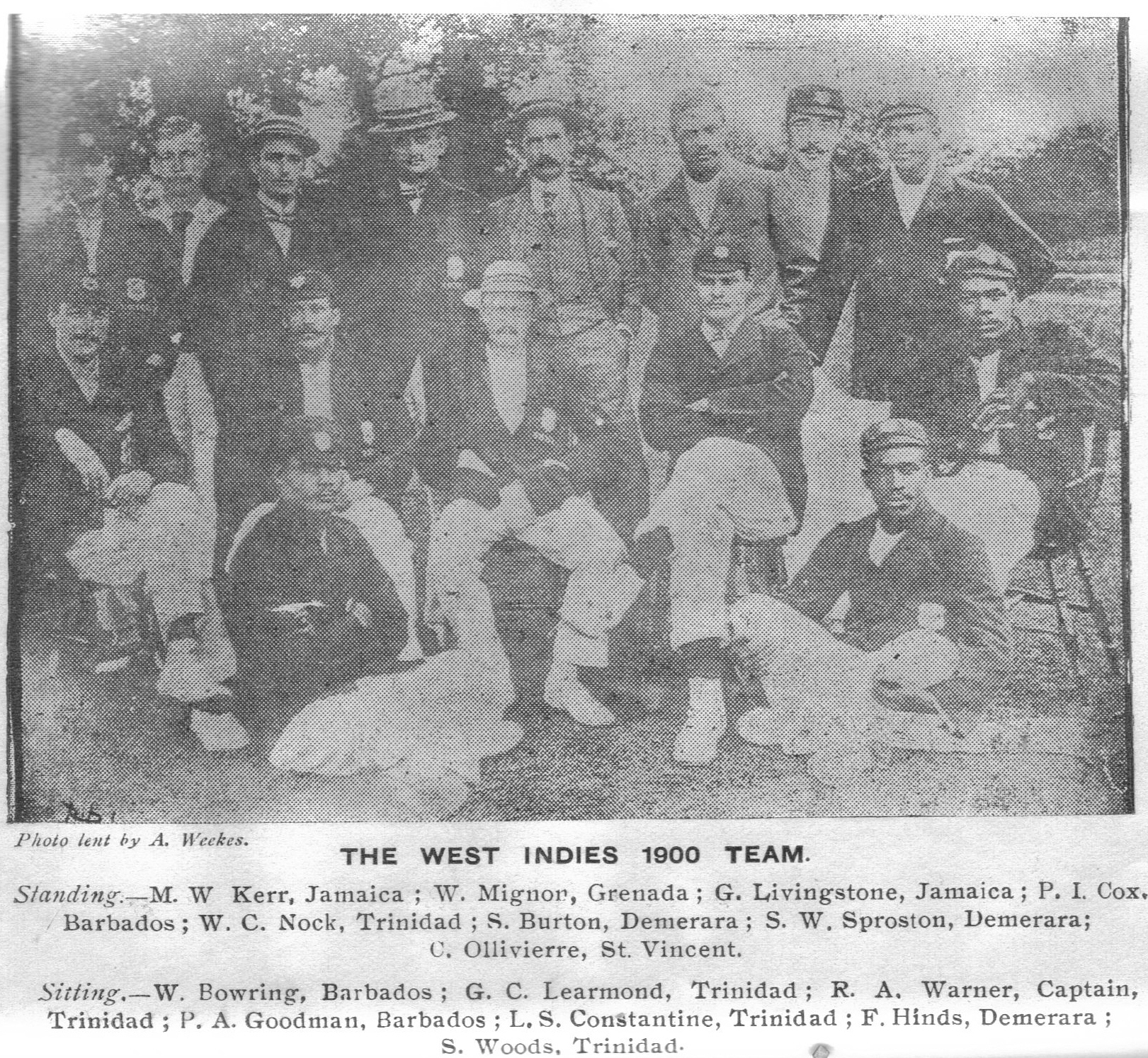
1900 West Indies Team

There had been an idea for a tour to England for some time and following the twin tours of Lord Hawke and Priestley to the West Indies in 1896–97. This idea was further developed and in June 1899 a combined West Indian eleven was invited to visit England. Lord Hawke was the chairperson of the Sports Committee of the West Indian Club and sent out an invitation in their name. The response was favourable, so he then arranged a series of matches for the summer of 1900. The initial selection of the West Indies team took place after the 1899–1900 Inter-Colonial Tournament in January 1900.

The 15 players that eventually made up the team consisted of:

Name	
R.S.A. Warner (c)	Trinidad
W. Bowring	Barbados
W.T. Burton	British Guiana
L.S. Constantine	Trinidad
P.I. Cox	Barbados
L.S. D'Ade	Trinidad
P.A. Goodman	Barbados
D.C.S. Hinds	Barbados
M.M. Kerr	Jamaica
G.V. Livingston	Jamaica
G.C. Learmond	British Guiana
W.H. Mignon	Grenada
C.A. Ollivierre	St. Vincent
S.W. Sproston	British Guiana
J. Woods	Trinidad

Burton and Woods were regarded as Professionals. W. C. Nock of Trinidad was the manager. Sproston acted as captain in the absence of Aucher Warner. P.F. Warner played in 1 match. R.S.A. Warner and P.F. Warner were brothers. It appears that the wicket-keeping was shared between Constantine and Learmond.

Cricket gives what is presumably the original list of 14 selections and 4 reserves. The selections includes H.A. Cole (Barbados) and G.B.Y. Cox (Barbados). Of the reserves P.I. Cox and Livingston made the final team, the other reserves being W.E. Goodman (British Guiana) and F.L. Pearce (Jamaica). R.S.A. Warner is not mentioned.

Cricket has an anonymous letter giving further details following a meeting in Barbados on 17 April. A letter had been received from British Guiana indicating that Sproston was unable to accompany the team, although this eventually turned out not to be the case. A letter was received from Jamaica suggesting that Livingston should go in Cole's place, this being agreed to. Further a letter was received from Mr. Aucher Warner offering his services as captain in accordance with the West Indies Cricket Committee in London. This offer was accepted and Bowring the original captain was to tour as an ordinary member. The team given also excludes P.I. Cox who did eventually take part in the tour.

H.B.G. Austin was unable to tour as he was fighting in South Africa.

The majority of the team was white. Burton and Woods were, of course, black as were Constantine, Hinds and Ollivierre amongst the Amateurs.

== Preliminaries ==
The Trinidad contingent sailed from Port of Spain on 24 May on R.M.S. Eden where they met the other tourists. On the day of their departure they were entertained at luncheon at the Ice House by the Barbados Committee. They left Barbados on R.M.S. Trent on 26 May and after a record journey arrived in Southampton on 6 June.

The tourists had a few days practice on the Hampshire ground and then travelled up to London to start their first match on 11 June.

== Matches ==
=== Status ===
The M.C.C. ruled that none of the matches were first-class. "It was perhaps, a pity that it was deemed advisable not to consider the West Indian matches as first-class, but it is difficult to see how this could be avoided; for on the form shown during the early part of the tour, the team would have been hopelessly out of the running, while, when the turn of the tide came, it was far too late to make any changes".

Of the 17 matches, 10 were against teams in the County Championship and they also played London County and the M.C.C. who were also first-class teams at that time. The remaining 5 matches were against minor teams, three were Minor Counties and while one match was against a combined Minor Counties team this was not at all representative. Liverpool and District were not regarded as first-class at this time.

=== Match 1 v London County ===
11–13 June
Scorecard

London County	v	West Indians
538 (124 overs); Jack Mason 126; Charles Ollivierre 2/24 (8 overs)		237 (79.2 overs); Percy Goodman 74; Jack Mason 5/50 (18.2 overs)
		103 (f/o) (30.2 overs); Charles Ollivierre 20; Aucher Warner 20; Jack Mason 5/43 (15 overs)

London County won by an innings and 198 runs
Crystal Palace Park, Crystal Palace

WG Grace had collected together a strong side to meet the West Indians in their first match. The tourists made a bad start when Aucher Warner lost the toss and WG and James Gilman added 135 for the first wicket. Tommie Burton then dismissed both openers and with Float Woods bowling Len Braund cheaply the West Indians were in a better position. Jack Mason however then scored 126 in 125 minutes and with useful scoring by Albert Lawton they reached 432/8 at the close.

A thunderstorm made the pitch easy for a while and Howard Parkes and Edward Berridge took the score to 538. The tourists were quickly 29/4 in reply with Charles Ollivierre being run out before Percy Goodman and Percy Cox added 113 together. Mason then took cheap wickets and left the side 176/8 at the close.

On the third day, Warner and Woods added 59 for the last wicket to take the total to 237. Following-on, they were dismissed for just 103 with Grace and Mason taking five wickets each. Ollivierre and Warner top scored with 20 each.

=== Match 2 v Worcestershire ===
14, 15, 16 June

Worcestershire {{{score1}}}	Vs	West Indians {{{score2}}}

Lost by 215 runs
Worcester

Bowring, Hinds and Kerr replaced D'Ade, Mignon and Warner. Sproston lost the toss and Worcestershire, who had 9 professionals in the team, batted and scored 307 in about 4 hours with Harry Foster top scoring with 79. Float Woods took 5/77 but otherwise the bowling was ineffective. The tourists made a poor start in reply and were 85/6 at the end of the first day with Frederick Pearson taking 4 cheap wickets. Pearson was only 19 and still qualifying for Worcestershire and so was only available for non-Championship matches in 1900.

Rain had affected the pitch overnight and despite a useful stand of 74 between Stanley Sproston and Percy Cox the West Indians were dismissed for 187 with Pearson taking 6/73. Worcestershire then made 257 with Pearson top scoring with 88 not out and Charles Ollivierre taking 4/37. The visitors were 61/4 at the close.

Fitz Hinds and Sproston added useful runs on the third day but after they were out the match was over soon after lunch. Pearson, who took another 4 wickets to make his match figures 10/108 to go with 100 runs for once out, was the star of the match.

=== Match 3 v Warwickshire ===
18, 19, 20 June

Warwickshire {{{score1}}}	Vs	West Indians {{{score2}}}

Lost by an innings and 111 runs
Edgbaston

Warner and Mignon returned to the side and Livingston made his debut. Burton was left out together with Constantine and Kerr. Warner lost the toss and by the end of the first day Warwickshire were 456/9 with Dick Lilley scoring 55 in an hour and John Hill scoring 145 in 200 minutes.

On the second day the Warwickshire team were soon dismissed for 456 which included 35 byes and 14 leg-byes. Tourists reached 233 with Charles Ollivierre and Percy Cox adding 109 useful runs for the second wicket. Cox top scored with 79. Both Percy Goodman and Gilbert Livingston were run out. Following-on they were dismissed cheaply for 122 on a showery third day.

=== Match 4 v Gentlemen of M.C.C. ===
21, 22, 23 June

Gentlemen of M.C.C. {{{score1}}}	Vs	West Indians {{{score2}}}

Lost by 5 wickets
Lord's

The tourists left out Hinds, Kerr, Livingston and Mignon for their first match at Lord's. There was no play on the first day due to rain. Warner lost the toss and WG Grace and Andrew Stoddart opened the batting on the second day. The tourists had early success but an innings of 118 from Arthur Somerset and other useful performances by the tail gave the M.C.C. over 200 for the last 4 wickets and a good total.

The West Indies struggled in reply and were 190 all out, George Learmond making 52 and adding 75 in 30 minutes with Charles Ollivierre. WG took 5 wickets. Following-on they were again in trouble at 132/8 and heading for an innings defeat. However Lebrun Constantine scored a magnificent 113 in 90 minutes. Assisted by Tommie Burton they added 162 for the 9th wicket in 65 minutes. Burton eventually made 64* and left the M.C.C. a target of 107 in a little over 2 hours. Stoddart took 7 wickets, all clean bowled. The two Professionals bowled well to reduce the M.C.C. to 36/4 but they reached their target with 5 minutes to spare for the loss of only one further wicket.

=== Match 5 v Minor Counties ===
25, 26, 27 June

West Indians {{{score1}}}	Vs	Minor Counties {{{score2}}}

Won by 61 runs
Northampton

Hinds, Kerr and Mignon replaced D'Ade, Goodman and Warner. The Minor Counties side was not at all representative and had 7 Northamptonshire players joined by Creber and Lowe from Glamorgan, Williams from Berkshire and Elliott from Durham. Sproston won the toss for the first time and the tourists made 206 with Charles Ollivierre making 69 in 2 hours. George Thompson took 7/84.

In reply the Minor Counties made 261 with Tommie Burton taking 6/55. Batting again the West Indians were in trouble but with 68 from Fitz Hinds and 30s from Percy Cox and William Bowring they set a target of 116. The Minor Counties were then dismissed for just 54 with Float Woods (4/31), Burton (3/11) and William Mignon (2/5) doing all the bowling and giving the tourists their first victory.

=== Match 6 v Gloucestershire ===
28, 29, 30 June

Gloucestershire {{{score1}}}	Vs	West Indians {{{score2}}}

Lost by an innings and 216 runs
Bristol

Goodman and Warner replaced Cox and Kerr. Gloucestershire won the toss and batted. The tourists had a good start taking 3 quick wickets but Stanley Brown scored a useful 60 and was out at 90/4. Charlie Townsend then joined Harry Wrathall and the pair added 209 for the fifth wicket, Gloucestershire then being 299/5. Gilbert Jessop then joined Townsend. Jessop reach his 50 in 20 minutes, 83 in 30, 102 in 43 and was out for 157 scored in an hour. He added 201 with Townsend in the hour taking the total to 500/6. His innings contain 29 4s. At this time a 6 was awarded only for hits out of the ground, so an unknown number of these 4s could have been modern-day 6s. Jessop hit Float Woods for five fours and a three in one over. Gloucestershire reached 518/7 at the close. Woods had strained himself in the previous match and could not bowl comfortably. In addition Tommie Burton damaged his foot at lunchtime and didn't bowl for the rest of the day.

On the second day Gloucestershire were all out for 619. Burton's figures of 5/68 in 25 overs look impressive but he had taken 3 wickets before lunch on the first day and took 2 tail-enders wickets on the second day and had not bowled when the runs were being piled on. William Mignon took 5/162, dismissing Wrathall, Townsend and Jessop, but Charles Ollivierre with 0/137 and Woods with 0/141 really suffered. Fitz Hinds did no better with 0/72 in just 8 overs.

When they batted the tourists collapsed for 98 with Percy Goodman run out for 38, Townsend and Frederick Roberts taking the wickets. Following-on they did much better. Lebrun Constantine top scored with 65 and 10 of the team reached double figures to give a respectable total of 307 reached by noon on the third day.

=== Match 7 v Leicestershire ===
2, 3, 4 July

West Indians {{{score1}}}	Vs	Leicestershire {{{score2}}}

Won by an innings and 87 runs
Leicester

Plum Warner played for West Indians in this match. He and Cox replaced Aucher Warner and Bowring. Sproston won the toss and Plum Warner and Charles Ollivierre then added 238 for the first wicket in 135 minutes, Warner made 113 and Ollivierre was eventually run out for 159 scored in 190 minutes. The day ended with the score at 307/4.

Lebrun Constantine scored a useful 41 on the second day to take the score to 383. Leicestershire collapsed for 80 with Float Woods taking 5/39 and Tommie Burton 4/39. Following-on they did much better and were 210/5 at the close of the second day, Charles de Trafford having scored 51. When play started on the third day Cecil Wood was soon out for 77 and the match was soon over, Burton taking 4/63 in the innings.

=== Match 8 v Nottinghamshire ===
9, 10, 11 July

Nottinghamshire {{{score1}}}	Vs	West Indians {{{score2}}}

Lost by an innings and 27 runs
Trent Bridge

Aucher Warner replaced his brother Plum in the side and the tourists had a three-day break before the match. Warner lost the toss again and the Nottinghamshire team scored 501 with William Gunn scoring 161 in 210 minutes out of 274. They were 343/4 at the close. On the second day James Iremonger scored 101. Tommie Burton took 5/159 in 73.3 overs in the innings.

In reply Percy Cox scored 55 but the West Indians were 124/6 at stumps. On the final day Aucher Warner reached 53* but the tourists followed-on 292 behind. In reply Stanley Sproston scored 72, Charles Ollivierre 50 and Lebrun Constantine 50*. Gunn took 7 wickets in the match with his lobs.

=== Match 9 v Wiltshire ===
12, 13, 14 July

Wiltshire {{{score1}}}	Vs	West Indians {{{score2}}}

Lost by an innings and 100 runs
Swindon

Bowring and Livingston were brought in for Learmond and Mignon. Warner lost the toss as usual and Wiltshire scored 313 and the tourists were 83/3 at the close with Lebrun Constantine scoring 43 in 20 minutes before being run out.

On the second day the tourists did badly and only got 37 more runs. William Overton took 7/35 in the innings. Following-on they did even worse, Constantine again being top score with 32. This was regarded as the worst performance of the tour.

=== Match 10 v Lancashire ===
16, 17 July

Lancashire {{{score1}}}	Vs	West Indians {{{score2}}}

Lost by 57 runs
Old Trafford

Learmond and Mignon replaced Goodman and Livingston. Warner lost the toss but Lancashire were dismissed for 187 with William Mignon taking 6/44. Henry Cudworth, who only placed a single first-class match in his career, scored 102 in 2 hours. In reply the tourists scored 174 with Charles Ollivierre scoring 44. Johnny Briggs was rested and did not bowl.

On the second day Lancashire were bowled out for 182, Briggs scoring 64, AN Hornby being absent having been injured fielding on the first day. Mignon took 4 more wickets to make it 10/117 in the match. Set a target of 196 the West Indies were 109/4 but after Ollivierre was out for 60 they fell well short. Briggs was turned loose and took 7/43 in the innings.

=== Match 11 v Derbyshire ===
19, 20, 21 July

Derbyshire {{{score1}}}	Vs	West Indians {{{score2}}}

Drawn
Derby

D'Ade and Goodman replaced Learmond and Warner. Derbyshire won the toss and scored 234. Tommie Burton with 4/78 and Percy Cox with 5/61 doing the damage. The West Indies were 38/1 at stumps.

On the second day the tourists passed the Derbyshire total but a thunderstorm caused two and a quarter hours of play to be lost at the end of the day. Lebrun Constantine and Percy Goodman had added 103 for the fifth wicket in just over an hour. Goodman eventually made 104* in a little over 2 hours. John Hulme did most of the damage taking 6/77. Derbyshire were 74/5 but recovered to score 182/7 before declaring leaving the tourists just 11 overs in which they reached 45/2. William Storer top scored in both innings for Derbyshire.

=== Match 12 v Staffordshire ===
23, 24 July

Staffordshire {{{score1}}}	Vs	West Indians {{{score2}}}

Drawn
Stoke-on-Trent

Kerr replaced Constantine. Staffordshire won the toss and scored 256 with Albert Hollowood scoring 103 in 3 hours. Tommie Burton took 7/100 in 42 overs. The West Indies were 42/1 at the close.

On the second day the tourists reached 228 with Fitz Hinds making 79. With only two days allocated the match was always likely to be drawn.

=== Match 13 v Hampshire ===
26, 27, 28 July

West Indians {{{score1}}}	Vs	Hampshire {{{score2}}}

Won by 88 runs
Southampton

Learmond replaced Kerr. Sproston won the toss and scored 366/9 on the first day Percy Cox and Percy Goodman adding 105 for the second wicket. Stanley Sproston top scored with 86 and William Bowring also contributed 63 useful runs. Charles Llewellyn bowled 54 overs in the innings taking 7/153.

Thunderstorms on the second day stopped play for three hours with Hampshire on 101/2 and only Victor Barton with 59 and Llewellyn with 93 had much success on a poor pitch. Float Woods took 6/93. The tourists were 20/0 at the close. The wicket was still poor on the third day and Llewellyn was again successful taking 6/34. Hampshire had little chance of victory and the two Professionals soon dispatched them, Woods taking 4/55 and Tommie Burton 5/50. The tourists had the best of the conditions for a change.

=== Match 14 v Surrey ===
30, 31 July

West Indians {{{score1}}}	Vs	Surrey {{{score2}}}

Won by an innings and 34 runs
The Oval

Constantine replaced Learmond. Sproston won the toss and the tourists batted. Charles Ollivierre and Percy Cox opened the batting and were not parted until Ollivierre was caught at square leg for 94 off Livingstone Walker, the score standing at 208. Cox was eventually out for 142 scored out of 261. Walker was the seventh bowler used but had great success taking 8/72 in 15 overs. Percy Goodman scored 34* but otherwise the wickets fell rapidly and the score eventually reached only 328. When Surrey batted Float Woods was unplayable and the batting team were soon 30/6 with Woods at this stage having figures of 5/8. John Shuter and Walker led a short recovery and Surrey were 86/7 at the close.

On the second morning Surrey were dismissed for 117 with Woods taking 7/48 in 19 overs. Following-on Surrey made a good start but soon started losing wickets. Edward Dowson was run out for the second time in the match when going well and Walker again batted well. Woods took 5/68 to make it 12 wickets in the match. Tommie Burton took the remaining 6 wickets. This was regarded as the best victory of the tour.

=== Match 15 v Liverpool and District ===
2, 3, 4 August

West Indians {{{score1}}}	Vs	Liverpool and District {{{score2}}}

Drawn
Liverpool

The tourists kept the same side and Sproston again won the toss and batted. Percy Cox scored 76 and Stanley Sproston scored 118 in 110 minutes, the two adding over 100 for the 5th wicket. William Mignon joined Sproston for the last wicket and despite making only 1* helped Sproston take his score from 64 to 118 and the West Indies to 265. Cecil Holden made 86 for Liverpool but Tommie Burton and Cox took 5 wickets each to give the tourists a first innings lead of 47. There had been no play at all on the second day.

There was only three and a half hours of play remaining when the tourists started their second innings which they declared closed at 124/5. Liverpool reached 100/0 at the close with Hubert Pilkington making 68* and Holden 23*.

Lebrun Constantine was given out in this match when a ball played by him lodged in his leg guard. The Liverpool wicket-keeper Arthur Kemble rushed up and picked the ball out and Constantine was initially given out. However the decision was then reversed, the law having changed in 1899, and he was allowed to continue his innings.

=== Match 16 v Yorkshire ===
6, 7, 8 August

Yorkshire {{{score1}}}	Vs	West Indians {{{score2}}}

Drawn
Bradford

Learmond replaced Mignon. Sproston lost the toss but play was limited to 25 minutes on the opening day. The match was abandoned on the second day.

=== Match 17 v Norfolk ===
10, 11 August

Norfolk {{{score1}}}	Vs	West Indians {{{score2}}}

Won by an innings and 16 runs
Norwich

Kerr replaced Learmond. Norfolk won the toss and batted. Float Woods and Percy Cox had Norfolk in all sorts of trouble but they eventually reached 117. Woods had taken 5/38 and Cox 4/44. The tourists also stated badly but Lionel D'Ade rescued the situation with 68* to enable the tourists to gain a first innings lead of 48. D'Ade had taken 2 hours for his first 34. Charles Shore took 5/64 for Norfolk.

When Norfolk batted again Burton was unplayable and took 8/9 in 10.4 overs including a spell of 5/0 in 5 overs. With Woods, who took 2/22 in 10 overs, they bowled unchanged and dismissed the county for just 32.

=== Summary ===
Of the 17 matches played, 5 matches were won, 8 were lost and 4 were drawn.

It is worth noting that in the 7 matches he played in Aucher Warner lost the toss each time. On each occasion the West Indians had to field first and on each occasion they lost the match. Stanley Sproston had more luck, winning the toss 5 times out of 10.

The first 10 matches were all won by the team batting first and it was only in the very last match against Norfolk that the team batting second won a game.

== Post Tour ==
A banquet was held for the team at the West Indian Club. The team left Southampton on 23 August abroad R.M.S. Don, returning to the West Indies on about 4 September.

== General Comments ==
The following comments made after the tour are typical. "A tour which, as an experiment, was extremely interesting and far more successful than might have been expected. As everyone thought at the time, the programme of matches arranged in December was too ambitious, but the defect was easily remedied, the leading counties putting far less than their full strength into the field when the West Indians had to be opposed.". Plum Warner said "I will begin 'right away' as the Americans say, by stating that the tour was a success. Considering that the team had never played together before, that they loss the toss on no fewer than twelve occasions out of the seventeen matches that the programme comprised, I think that the judgment I have given will be endorsed on all sides".

He continues later: "The weakest points of the team were: (1) The absence of a reliable wicket-keeper, and (2) The bad judgment that was too often displayed when running".

'Cricket' says that "The members of the team, white and coloured alike, have proved themselves to be good sportsmen and keen opponents, while the very fact that they did not come over for the purpose of making money, but as sportsmen pure and simple, makes all cricketers regret that the guarantors may have to be called upon". The last point alluding to the fact that tour was expected to lose money.

== Race Issues ==
In 1900 the idea of different races playing together in the same match was a bit of a novelty. Only in the West Indies and India were there significant numbers of coloured cricketers playing. Kumar Shri Ranjitsinhji, an Indian prince (universally known as Ranji), had been playing in English cricket for a few years but otherwise coloured cricketers were rarely seen.

During the opening match a formal welcome was given to the team during which it appears that Aucher Warner had made the remark: "we have come to learn, sir" to WG Grace. The following day a cartoon appeared in the 'Star' in which "Dr Grace, a giant is the central figure, bat in hand, and around him, crouching, stooping, imploring are six black urchins of hideous appearance and rather diminutive in size, all of whom are evidently shedding tears. Below appears the words 'We have come to learn, sah!.'" Designed to be amusing, similar cartoons appeared in this and later tours.

When asked whether the coloured members of the team quickly fell into English ways Mr Nock, the Manager, reported: "Very soon. They are thorough sportsmen, and have given no trouble whatever during the tour." Later he says that "In our first match I was walking through the grounds with Woods, who suddenly said to me: Mr. Nock they have got a lot of white people in this country!".

Woods himself is reported as saying about the tour: "I enjoyed it very much. There was the cricket and going about in trains; I liked the views very much. The travelling didn't tire me much and I never had to be left out of the team. I think I should like to live in England, though I don't know whether I could stand the cold in the winter."

It is also worth noting that Ollivierre, a coloured Amateur, was signed up by Derbyshire during the tour and played for them for a number of years.

Much has been made over the years of Gilbert Jessop's innings of 157 in an hour and the reactions of the coloured cricketers. C.L.R. James reports that Float Woods "went to his captain and asked permission to take off his boots. West Indian captain Aucher Warner asked him why: he replied that he could bowl properly only when barefooted. Woods was making the best response he knew to a truly desperate situation." Sammy Woods in his autobiography reports that Jessop "hit the two famous Black Bowlers (Cumberbatch and Woods) so furiously that not only they couldn't bowl for laughter, but the rest of the dark ones in the field rolled about and set up a howl of delight". Archie Cumberbatch was, of course, not on the tour at all and this and other remarks are probably embellished. Overall the reports are of doubtful accuracy and have racist undertones to them.

So from what is reported it seems that race was not a major issue during the tour. Whether this really reflects the reality is difficult to tell at this distance in time.

== Averages ==
The following averages are for all 17 matches.

=== Batting ===
Player	P	I	NO	R	HS	Ave	100	50	C/S
CA Ollivierre	17	29	2	883	159	32.70	1	4	11
LS Constantine	14	22	2	610	113	30.50	1	3	15/1
PI Cox	16	25	0	755	142	30.20	1	5	5
PA Goodman	15	23	3	563	104*	28.15	1	2	4
SW Sproston	17	27	0	600	118	22.22	1	3	7
DCS Hinds	15	23	1	443	79	20.13	–	2	19
LS D'Ade	9	13	2	193	68*	17.54	–	1	3
RSA Warner	7	14	2	190	53*	15.83	–	1	–
W Bowring	14	23	2	309	63	14.71	–	1	7
WT Burton	16	26	1	291	64*	11.64	–	1	11
GC Learmond	11	19	0	173	52	9.10	–	1	3
J Woods	17	27	7	145	36	7.25	–	–	17
WH Mignon	12	19	8	68	17*	6.18	–	–	4
MM Kerr	4	6	0	29	20	4.83	–	–	1
GV Livingston	2	4	1	10	9	3.33	–	–	1

PF Warner played in 1 match, scoring 113.

1 catch was taken by a substitute fielder.

=== Bowling ===
Player	O	M	R	W	BB	Ave	5i	10m
J Woods	547.4	128	1551	72	7/47	21.54	6	2
WT Burton	660.5	188	1681	78	8/9	21.55	8	–
SW Sproston	12	1	54	2	1/15	27.00	–	–
PI Cox	185	22	673	24	5/64	28.04	1	–
WH Mignon	285.5	65	883	30	6/44	29.43	2	1
CA Ollivierre	108.5	19	462	13	4/37	35.53	–	–
PA Goodman	82.2	11	270	5	2/49	54.00	–	–
DCS Hinds	76	8	325	6	2/48	54.16	–	–
GV Livingston	18	2	65	0				
LS Constantine	18	3	79	0				

Woods bowled 5 no balls and 1 wide. Burton 1 no ball, Cox 1 no ball and 1 wide, Mignon 7 wides, Constantine 1 wide.

== Annual reviews ==
- Wisden Cricketers' Almanack 1901 (pages xciv to xcvii and 426 to 444)
