= Steve Camacho =

West Indian cricketer (1945–2015)

Personal information
- Full name: George Stephen Camacho
- Born: 15 October 1945; Georgetown, British Guiana
- Died: 2 October 2015 (aged 69); Antigua, Antigua and Barbuda
- Batting: Right-handed
- Bowling: Leg-break googly
- Relatives: George Learmond (grandfather), George Camacho (father)

International information
- National side: West Indies
- Test debut: 19 January 1968 v England
- Last Test: 6 March 1971 v India

Domestic team information
- Years: Team
- 1964–65 to 1978–79: Guyana

Career statistics
Competition	Test	First-class
Matches	11	76
Runs scored	640	4,079
Batting average	29.09	34.86
100s/50s	0/4	7/24
Top score	87	166
Balls bowled	18	504
Wickets	0	8
Bowling average	–	27.00
5 wickets in innings	–	0
10 wickets in match	–	0
Best bowling	–	3/10
Catches/stumpings	4/–	47/–
- Source: CricInfo, 31 October 2022

George Stephen Camacho (15 October 1945 – 2 October 2015) was a West Indian international cricketer who played in eleven Test matches from 1968 to 1971 as an opening batsman and occasional leg-spin bowler. He was part of the West Indian Test side for four series: 1967–68, 1968–69, 1969, 1970–71. He played first-class cricket for Guyana from 1965 to 1979. After retiring from playing, Camacho served West Indies cricket in several administrative roles including selector, team manager, and as the secretary/chief executive of the West Indies Cricket Board from 1982 to 2000.

== Early life ==
Of Portuguese descent, Camacho was born in Georgetown on 15 October 1945. He was educated at St. Stanislaus College. His grandfather, George Learmond, and father, George Camacho both played first-class cricket.

== Playing career ==
Camacho made a promising start to his cricket career by scoring 157 for Guyana Colts against the touring Australian side in April 1965. A few days later he made his first-class debut against the same opposition. The following year, he made his maiden first-class century against Trinidad and Tobago on his Shell Shield debut in the inaugural season of the competition.

Following innings of 85 and 35 for the Board President's XI against the MCC in 1968, (Note: At the time the MCC organised and administered English cricket. Official English touring teams always played under the name of MCC and were only styled "England" during Test matches.) he was named in the first Test squad for the series with England. On Test debut he made scores of 22 and 43, the latter helped West Indies secure a draw on the final day after following on. He scored his maiden Test fifty in the third Test, however after taking five and 3/4 hours to accumulate 57, his defensive style was criticised with John Woodcock commenting: "Camacho played more like a man in a coma than a West Indian batsman; he was correct but utterly anonymous". In the next Test, Camacho made his Test best of 87 in under three hours and his transformation in approach was praised with Wisden noting: "he played hitherto unrevealed strokes all round the wicket". The match was famous for Garry Sobers declaration which gave England the opportunity to secure a seven-wicket victory, the decisive result in the series.

On the tour of Australia later that year, Camacho played in the first two Tests but after scoring 57 runs was dropped from the side. He was included in the touring party to England in 1969, as one of the three opening batsmen alongside Roy Fredericks and Joey Carew. Camacho missed the first Test due to flu, but replaced Carew for the Lord's Test where he shared a 106-run partnership with Fredericks which surpassed the previous best opening stand for the West Indies in England. After a score of 71 in the final Test, Camacho topped the West Indies batting averages for the series.

In the home series with India in 1971, Camacho scored 68 runs across two Tests but after West Indies suffered their first ever defeat to the tourists, he was one of four players dropped for the third Test. His final tour was to England in 1973: in only the second game, his cheekbone was fractured by a bouncer from Hampshire's Andy Roberts and he left the tour, never to play another Test. He continued to play for Guyana until 1979 including a spell as captain. He also appeared for Demerara, making his highest first-class score of 166 for them in the annual Jones Cup match against Berbice in 1975.

Bespectacled at the crease, Camacho was considered a technically correct and patient opening batsman. His style contrasted with his more aggressive opening partner Roy Fredericks.

== After retirement ==
After retirement in 1979, Camacho served in administrative roles for West Indies cricket, initially as a selector and team manager. In 1982, he was appointed as the first executive secretary (latterly entitled chief executive) of the West Indies Cricket Board, a position he held for 18 years. He resigned the role in 2000 when first diagnosed with cancer. He briefly returned to the role on an interim basis in 2009 following the resignation of Donald Peters. Camacho was the author of a book, Cricket at Bourda: Celebrating the Georgetown Cricket Club.

Camacho died on 2 October 2015, at the age of 69. His ashes were buried at the Bourda cricket ground.
