= Edward Fortescue Wright =

English cricketer

Edward Wright
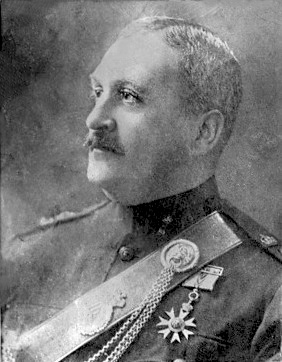

Personal information
- Full name: Edward Fortescue Wright
- Born: 11 March 1858; Chudleigh, Devon, England
- Died: 23 November 1904 (aged 46); Kingston, Jamaica
- Batting: Right-handed
- Bowling: Roundarm, right-arm fast

Domestic team information
- Years: Team
- 1878: Gloucestershire
- 1882–1895: Demerara
- 1895–1897: British Guiana
- 1901–1902: Jamaica

Career statistics
| Competition | First-class |
|---|---|
| Matches | 18 |
| Runs scored | 759 |
| Batting average | 23.71 |
| 100s/50s | 1/3 |
| Top score | 123 |
| Balls bowled | 1,615 |
| Wickets | 47 |
| Bowling average | 12.80 |
| 5 wickets in innings | 3 |
| 10 wickets in match | 2 |
| Best bowling | 7/15 |
| Catches/stumpings | 11/– |
- Source: CricketArchive, 16 January 2011

Edward Fortescue Wright CMG (born 11 March 1858 in Coburg, Chudleigh, Devon, murdered on 23 November 1904 in Kingston, Jamaica) was an English cricketer who became a member of the Colonial Service in the West Indies.

== Life and career ==
Wright was a right-handed batsman and a round-arm right-arm fast bowler. He was educated at Sydney College, Bath. Scores and Biographies notes that he was 5 foot 10½ inches tall and weighed 11 stone 10 pounds.

Edward Wright played four matches for Gloucestershire in 1878 scoring 81 runs and taking one wicket. On his debut against Surrey James Lillywhite's Cricketers' Annual reported that "Mr. E. Wright, an amateur debutant, [contributed] a very freely hit 32." Earlier he had played for Somerset in 1875, before they were first-class, and for Devon between 1876 and 1884.

He joined the Colonial Service and was posted to British Guiana. He made his debut for the colony against Trinidad in 1882-83 when he took 4 wickets and then scored 123 out of the British Guiana total of 168. This was the first first-class century in the West Indies. In 1887-88 he took 3-17 and 7–15 against Barbados.

Against Slade Lucas's team in 1894-95 he took 5–34 in the first match and then scored 54 in the second match. More success followed in the 1895-96 Inter-Colonial Tournament when he scored 96 against Trinidad and then scored 26 and 85 and took 3-58 and 7–53 in the final against Barbados. In 1896-97 he played against Lord Hawke's team but had less success.

The following season he was posted to Jamaica and joined the Jamaican Constabulary. He was promoted to Inspector General in charge of the Jamaica Constabulary and in 1902 was awarded the CMG for his services. While in Jamaica he played three matches for Jamaica against the touring R. A. Bennett's XI in 1901-02.

Wright married Constance Hext in 1881 and they had a son, Arthur, who played for the Army against the Royal Navy at Lord's in 1904 and also played for Devon. After the death of his first wife, Wright married Annie Douglas Alexander in 1891, and they had two sons: Douglas and Oswin.

In 1902 a riot took place at Montego Bay. A small group of police with Wright in charge went there at once to investigate the incident. On the following day Wright and a colleague, Inspector Clarke, were strolling unarmed through the town and were mistaken for members of the local police force. They were attacked and whilst Inspector Clarke received a fractured skull from which he eventually recovered, Wright was so badly hurt that he died shortly afterwards.
