= Lebrun Constantine =

Trinidad and Tobago cricketer

Personal information
- Full name: Lebrun Samuel Constantine
- Born: 25 May 1874; Maraval, Trinidad
- Died: 5 January 1942 (aged 67); Tunapuna, Trinidad
- Batting: Right-handed
- Role: Wicket-keeper

Domestic team information
- Years: Team
- 1893–1922: Trinidad
- First-class debut: 19 September 1893 Trinidad v Barbados
- Last First-class: 28 September 1922 Trinidad v Barbados

Career statistics
Competition	First-class
Matches	56
Runs scored	2433
Batting average	25.34
100s/50s	1/13
Top score	116
Balls bowled	1662
Wickets	46
Bowling average	13.73
5 wickets in innings	1
10 wickets in match	0
Best bowling	6/17
Catches/stumpings	95/18
- Source: CricketArchive, 20 December 2009

Lebrun Samuel Constantine (25 May 1874 in Maraval, Trinidad – 5 January 1942 at Tunapuna, Trinidad) was a West Indian cricketer who toured England in 1900 and 1906 and was a regular member of the Trinidad team from 1893-94 to 1922-23. He was primarily a batsman. He often kept wicket but was also a useful occasional bowler. He was an overseer on a cocoa estate in Diego Martin.

He is best known as the father of Learie Constantine and is often known as Old Cons. Another son Elias was also a useful cricketer and his brother-in-law Victor Pascall also toured with the West Indies in 1923.

Lebrun Constantine

He was a member of both the 1900 and 1906 West Indies touring sides. He was second in the West Indies batting averages in 1900 and third in 1906 so was regarded as one of the successes of these tours. In 1900 he scored the first century by a West Indian in England when he made 113 against the Gentlemen of the M.C.C., described by Wisden as "a dashing and faultless display". Before the 1906 tour he was described as "an excellent bat; considered to be Austin's rival, but his strokes lack the finish of Austin's" and "another of the brigade who proved himself very strong on the left side and can bat with power. He fields in the slips and can bowl right arm medium pace if required".

In the West Indies he was selected to play for the combined West Indian team against touring English teams on a number of occasions: in 1896-97, 1901-02, 1904-05 and 1912-13. He was a regular member of the Trinidad team playing a number of matches in the Inter-Colonial Tournament although only from the 4th tournament in 1899-1900. He scored his only first class century against British Guiana in the 10th tournament in 1909-10

He made his final appearance in an important match for Trinidad against Barbados in British Guiana at the age of 48 playing alongside his son Learie who had just turned 21.
