= Bay Pasture =

Cricket ground and parade ground in Bridgetown, Barbados

- Wanderers Ground
- Interactive map of Bay Pasture

Ground information
- Location: Bridgetown, Barbados
- Country: Barbados
- Coordinates: 13.0890°N 59.6024°W
- Establishment: 1877

Team information
Barbados	(1883/84–1891/92)
- As of 23 April 2022; Source: Ground profile

Bay Pasture was a cricket ground in Bridgetown, Barbados.

== History ==
The ground was established when the Wanderers Cricket Club was formed in 1877, with the club playing on a small ground on the Bay Pasture Estate; it possessed a small pavilion and was tightly enclosed by houses. The ground was an important venue in the early days of Barbadian cricket, hosting a first-class match between Barbados and Demerara in 1883. Four first-class matches in the 1891–92 Inter-Colonial Tournament were later played there, featuring Barbados, Demerara and Trinidad. Restricted by its small confines, the Bay Pasture was soon overtaken in importance by the more spacious Kensington Oval, which became the headquarters of Barbados cricket and hosted all important matches on the island. The ground remained as the home of the Wanderers Cricket Club until 1952, when the club moved to a new ground in Dayrells Road. In its final years, a young Garfield Sobers assisted with working the scoreboard at the ground. A primary school today occupies the site.

== Records ==
=== First-class ===
- Highest team total: 240 for 6 declared by Barbados v Demerara, 1891–92
- Lowest team total: 54 all out by Demerara v Barbados, 1891–92
- Highest individual innings: 74 by Percy Goodman for Barbados v Trinidad, 1891–92
- Best bowling in an innings: 8-17 by Oscar Weber for Demerara v Barbados, 1891–92
- Best bowling in a match: 14-57 by Clifford Goodman for Barbados v Demerara, 1891–92

== See also ==
- List of cricket grounds in the West Indies
