= Malcolm Kerr =

Malcolm Kerr may refer to:

- Malcolm H. Kerr (1931–1984), American university professor killed by gunmen in Beirut
- Malcolm Kerr (cricketer) (1877–?), West Indian cricketer
- Malcolm Kerr (politician) (born 1950), Australian politician
