= William Mignon =

West Indian cricketer

William Henry Mignon (1874 in Lewisham, London – 30 November 1965 in the West Indies) was a West Indian cricketer who toured with the first West Indian touring side to England in 1900. He was the son of Edward Adolphus Seymour Mignon and Margaret Bridget (née Campbell).

Born in England he emigrated to Grenada in the West Indies in the 1890s. Being in Grenada his opportunities to play in big cricket matches were limited.

He was described before the 1900 tour as "The best amateur bowler in the West Indies. He gets on a lot of work both ways, and uses his head a good deal. He generally bowls a medium pace, but he has a very fast ball up his sleeve. As a batsman, often makes runs, and fields well, especially at slip. As hard as nails, and can bowl all day". On the tour he took 30 wickets at an average of just under 30. Besides the two professional bowlers he was the most heavily used but his bowling was regarded as "very disappointing" perhaps because "at the start of the trip he was by no means fit". His batting also proved a disappointment. He took 5–162 against Gloucestershire and eventually took the wicket of Gilbert Jessop after his rapid innings. His best bowling was the 10 wickets he took against Lancashire.

His only first-class appearances were for AB St Hill's combined team which toured Trinidad in 1898-99 and 1900-01.

He had played for Grenada against Lord Hawke's team in 1896-97 where he impressed taking 6-44 for St. George's C.C. against the tourists. He also played for the combined Grenada/St. Vincent team in Grenada against Bennett's side in 1901-02. In the first match against Bennett's team he took 5–70 in the only innings of the English side bowling alongside Richard Ollivierre. In the second match he added 53 for the last wicket with O.C. Arthur, after the combined side had been reduced to 67–9, although they still lost heavily.
