= Arthur Wright (Royal Navy officer) =

English cricketer and Royal Navy officer

Captain Arthur Wright DSO
- Born: Arthur Edward Hext Wright; 7 February 1886; Georgetown, Demerara, British Guiana
- Died: 30 November 1970 (aged 84); Chudleigh, Devon, England
- Cricket career

Personal information
- Batting: Right-handed
- Relatives: Edward Wright (father)

Domestic team information
- Years: Team
- 1921–1923: Devon

Career statistics
| Competition | First-class |
|---|---|
| Matches | 1 |
| Runs scored | 87 |
| Batting average | 43.50 |
| 100s/50s | –/1 |
| Top score | 57 |
| Catches/stumpings | –/– |
- Source: Cricinfo, 1 December 2019

Arthur Edward Hext Wright DSO (7 February 1886 – 13 November 1970) was a Royal Navy officer and English first-class cricketer.

The son of the cricketer Edward Wright and his wife Constant Hext, he was born in February 1886 at Georgetown in British Guiana. He was educated in England at the Britannia Royal Naval College, graduating into the Royal Navy as a sub-lieutenant in September 1905. He was promoted to the rank of lieutenant in June 1908. Wright later appeared in a single first-class cricket match for the Royal Navy against the British Army cricket team at Lord's in 1914. Batting twice in the match, he was dismissed for 30 runs in the navy first-innings by Hervey Lawrence, while in their second-innings he made a half century, scoring 57 runs before being dismissed by Francis Wyatt. He served in the Royal Navy in the First World War, during which he was promoted to the rank of lieutenant-commander in July 1916.

Following the war, Wright was awarded the Distinguished Service Order in March 1920 for distinguished services in the Baltic with the 2nd Destroyer Flotilla, with promotion to the rank of commander coming in December of the same year. Wright played minor counties cricket for Devon in 1921, making three appearances, before making a final appearance in 1923. He was placed on the retired list at his own request in May 1932, at which point he was granted the rank of captain. He was recalled to service shortly before the Second World War and was placed as the naval officer in charge of the Humber in August 1939, before being appointed as a maintenance captain in Liverpool. In April 1942, he was appointed to command the shore establishment HMS Badger. Wright died in November 1970 at Chudleigh, Devon.
