= Gilbert Livingston (cricketer) =

West Indian cricketer

Gilbert Vivian Livingston (22 November 1877 – 29 December 1928) was a West Indian cricketer who toured with the first West Indian touring side to England in 1900.

Initially he was a reserve in the 1900 touring side but with a number of players dropping out he became a member of the team. He was described as a "very good bowler; quite the best player Jamaica can put forward". However he proved to be a disappointment and played in only two matches, against Warwickshire and Wiltshire. He was a member of Kensington and Kingston Cricket Club.

He played his cricket in Jamaica where opportunities to play in big matches were limited. He played against Priestley's side in 1896-97 and in one of the matches against Lord Brackley's side in 1904-05.

Against Priestley's team he took 7-49 and 6-62 and proved to be the only effective bowler.

He died in Kingston in 1928.
