= Charles Stone (English cricketer) =

English cricketer

Personal information
- Full name: Charles Cecil Stone
- Born: 13 June 1865; Knighton, Leicestershire, England
- Died: 11 November 1951 (aged 86); Eastbourne, Sussex, England
- Batting: Right-handed
- Bowling: Right-arm medium

Domestic team information
- Years: Team
- 1899: Oxfordshire
- 1895–1896: Leicestershire
- 1894–1896: Marylebone Cricket Club

Career statistics
Competition	First-class
Matches	14
Runs scored	203
Batting average	8.12
100s/50s	–/1
Top score	55
Balls bowled	20
Wickets	–
Bowling average	–
5 wickets in innings	–
10 wickets in match	–
Best bowling	–
Catches/stumpings	4/–
- Source: Cricinfo, 10 February 2013

Charles Cecil Stone (13 June 1865 − 11 November 1951) was an English cricketer. Stone was a right-handed batsman who bowled right-arm medium pace. He was born at Knighton, Leicestershire.

== Cricket ==
Stone made his first-class debut for the Marylebone Cricket Club against Leicestershire at Lord's in 1894. The following season he made his debut for Leicestershire in a first-class match against the Marylebone Cricket Club, with him making three further first-class appearances for the county in the 1895 County Championship, as well as a further appearance for the Marylebone Cricket Club against Hampshire. The following season he made two first-class appearances for the Marylebone Cricket Club against Nottinghamshire and Warwickshire. He also made three first-class appearances for Leicestershire in the 1896 County Championship against Yorkshire, Warwickshire and Hampshire. He later toured the West Indies with A. A. Priestley's XI in 1896–97, making three first-class appearances during the tour against Barbados. He made a single half century in first-class cricket, scoring 55 runs for Leicestershire against Hampshire in 1896. He scored 107 runs for Leicestershire at an average of 7.57. He later played for Oxfordshire in the 1899 Minor Counties Championship, making three appearances.

== Military career ==
Stone was commissioned a second-lieutenant in the Berkshire Yeomanry on 19 June 1900. He volunteered for active service in South Africa during the ongoing Second Boer War, and joined the Imperial Yeomanry where he was appointed a lieutenant of the 15th Battalion (Imperial Yeomanry). On 27 September 1901 he was promoted to captain in the battalion, with the temporary rank of captain in the Army. He stayed in South Africa until the war ended in June 1902, left Port Elizabeth for Southampton on the SS Colombian the following month, and relinquished his commission in the Imperial Yeomanry on 3 September 1902, when he was granted the honorary rank of captain in the Army. Stone was also promoted to a captain in the Berkshire Yeomanry on 11 June 1902, while seconded to the Imperial Yeomanry.

He died at Eastbourne, Sussex on 11 November 1951.
