= G. Aubrey Goodman =

Barbadian barrister and politician

Sir Gerald Aubrey Goodman KC (6 September 1862 – 20 January 1921 in Barbados) was a Barbadian barrister and politician. He also served as Attorney-General of the Straits Settlements and as a judge in Malaya. His final appointment was as Chief Justice of the Straits Settlements but he died before he could take office.

== Early life and education ==
Goodman was the son of Augustus Flavius Goodman. He was educated at Lodge School and Harrison College on the island and University College, London, before being called to the bar by the Middle Temple in 1885. He then returned to Barbados to practise.

== Career ==
=== Barbados ===
He was appointed Solicitor-General of Barbados in 1896 (having acted in the role in 1890, 1891, and 1892) and Attorney-General of Barbados in 1907 (having acted in the role in 1891, 1898, 1900, 1901, 1902, 1903, and 1904), serving until 1913. He was a member of the Barbados House of Assembly from 1889 to 1912, the Barbados Board of Education from 1891 to 1912, and the Quarantine Board and General Board of Health from 1902 to 1912.

He was appointed a King's Counsel in 1903.

=== Malaya ===
In 1913, he was appointed Attorney General of the Straits Settlements and served in that position until 1919, when he was appointed Chief Judicial Commissioner (Chief Justice) of the Federated Malay States. He was appointed Chief Justice of the Straits Settlement in November 1920, but died before he could take up the post.

Goodman was knighted in the 1920 New Year Honours.

== Personal life and death ==
He was also a cricketer, playing two first-class matches for Barbados against Trinidad in Port of Spain in September 1893. Captaining the team and keeping wicket, he led Barbados to victory in both matches, which included the final of the Inter-Colonial Tournament for 1893–94. His brothers Clifford, Percy and Evans also played in both matches.

Goodman died in January 1921 in Bath, England. He was buried in the Abbey Cemetery. His coffin was placed in the grave of his wife, Gertrude, who had died a few weeks previously. She was the daughter of the artist Edward John Cobbett. Goodman Road in Singapore is named after Goodman.
