= James Leigh (cricketer) =

English cricketer

James Leigh (20 December 1862 – 25 September 1925) was an English cricketer active from 1887 to 1908 who played for Lancashire. He was born in Preston and died in Shepperton-on-Thames. He appeared in ten first-class matches as a righthanded batsman, scoring 157 runs with a highest score of 26 and held five catches. He was a member of A. A. Priestley's team touring the West Indies in 1896–97.
