= Clifford Goodman =

Barbadian cricketer

Personal information
- Full name: Clifford Everard Goodman
- Born: 20 November 1869; College View, St Philip, Barbados
- Died: 1 February 1911 (aged 41); Belleville, St Michael, Barbados
- Batting: Right-handed
- Bowling: Right-arm fast
- Relatives: Percy Goodman (brother); G. Aubrey Goodman (brother)

Domestic team information
- Years: Team
- 1891-92 to 1896-97: Barbados

Career statistics
| Competition | First-class |
|---|---|
| Matches | 15 |
| Runs scored | 274 |
| Batting average | 17.12 |
| 100s/50s | 0/1 |
| Top score | 68 |
| Balls bowled |
| Wickets | 126 |
| Bowling average | 10.53 |
| 5 wickets in innings | 15 |
| 10 wickets in match | 6 |
| Best bowling | 8/40 |
| Catches/stumpings | 14/– |
- Source: Cricinfo, 15 August 2021

Clifford Everard Goodman (20 November 1869 – 1 February 1911), was a Barbadian cricketer of the 1890s.

A right-arm fast bowler, Goodman was educated at The Lodge School, Barbados. He stood at 6 ft 4ins and took 126 wickets at 10.70 in his 15 match first-class career. During his five-year first-class career he was almost always successful and was described after his death in 1911 as "perhaps the best bowler the West Indies ever had, and a good hitter too". In the history of first-class cricket, he has the highest average of wickets per match among bowlers with 100 wickets or more, with 8.4 wickets per match.

He played in all 14 Barbados matches from 1891–92 to 1896–97. He was also selected for the combined West Indies against Priestley's side in 1896–97, taking 9 wickets in the match, which the West Indies team won. In the match for Barbados, that preceded the West Indies match, he took 8 for 40 and 6 for 50 in Barbados's 136-run victory over Priestley's XI.

His younger brother Percy was also one of the top West Indian players of his day and toured England in 1900 and 1906. Clifford (eight wickets) and Percy (ten wickets) dismissed Trinidad for 35 and 41 to win the final of the Inter-Colonial Tournament for Barbados in 1893–94. Two other brothers, Aubrey and Evans, also played first-class cricket. All four brothers played for Barbados in the 1893-94 match, when Aubrey captained the team.
