= Pelham Warner =

English cricketer (1873–1963)

Sir Pelham Warner MBE
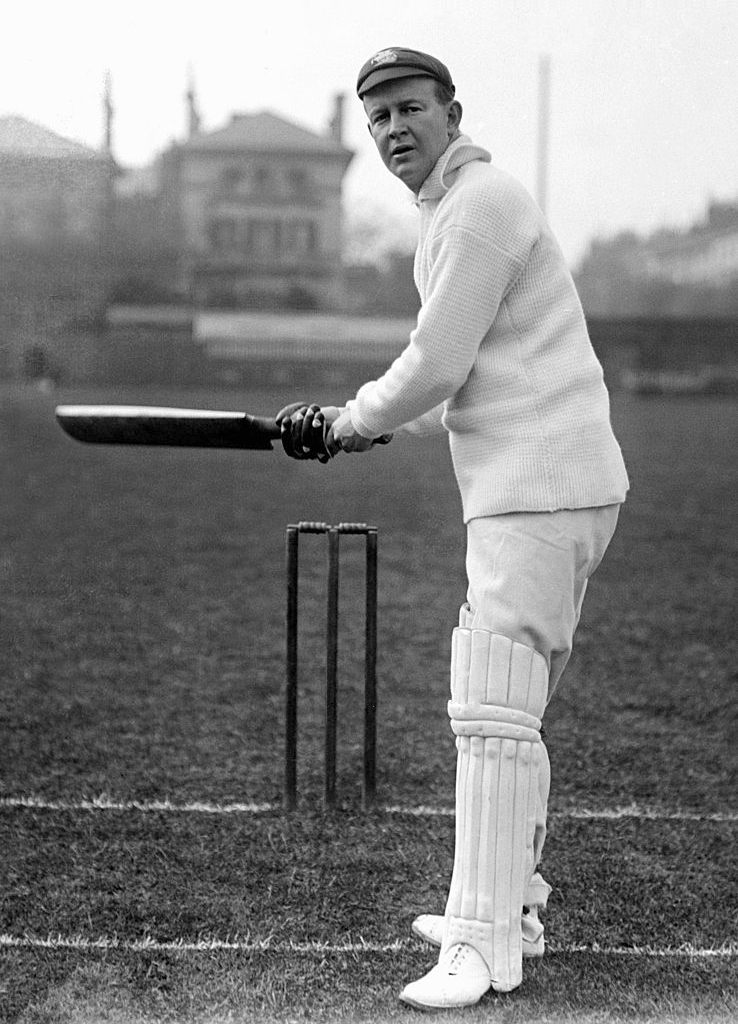
- Warner in 1906

Personal information
- Full name: Pelham Francis Warner
- Born: 2 October 1873; Port of Spain, Trinidad
- Died: 30 January 1963 (aged 89); West Lavington, Sussex, England
- Nickname: Plum
- Batting: Right-handed
- Bowling: Right-arm slow

International information
- National side: England (1899–1912)
- Test debut (cap 118): 14 February 1899 v South Africa
- Last Test: 26 June 1912 v Australia

Domestic team information
- Years: Team
- 1894–1920: Middlesex
- 1894–1896: Oxford University

Career statistics
Competition	Tests	First-class
Matches	15	521
Runs scored	622	29,028
Batting average	23.92	36.28
100s/50s	1/3	60/149
Top score	132*	244
Balls bowled	0	1,132
Wickets	–	15
Bowling average	–	42.40
5 wickets in innings	–	0
10 wickets in match	–	0
Best bowling	–	2/26
Catches/stumpings	3/–	183/–
- Source: Cricinfo, 11 November 2008

Sir Pelham Francis Warner, MBE (2 October 1873 – 30 January 1963), affectionately and better known as Plum Warner or "the Grand Old Man" of English cricket, was a Test cricketer and cricket administrator.

He was knighted for services to sport in the 1937 Coronation Honours.

== Early life ==
Warner was born in Port of Spain, Trinidad, the youngest of 21 children. His mother, Rosa Cadiz, was a Spanish woman, and his father Charles Warner, was from an English colonial family. He was educated in Barbados at Harrison College, and then sent to England to Rugby School and Oriel College, Oxford. As well as cricket, he had a passion for golf and real tennis.

== Cricket career ==
As a right-hand batsman, Warner played first-class cricket for Oxford University, Middlesex and England. He played 15 Test matches, captaining in 10 of them, with a record of won 4, lost 6. He succeeded in regaining The Ashes in 1903–04, winning the series against Australia 3–2. However he was less successful when he captained England on the tour of South Africa in 1905–06, suffering a resounding 1–4 defeat, the first time England had lost to South Africa in a Test match. He was also to have captained England on the 1911–12 tour of Australia, but fell ill. He was unable to play in any of the Tests, with Johnny Douglas taking over the captaincy.

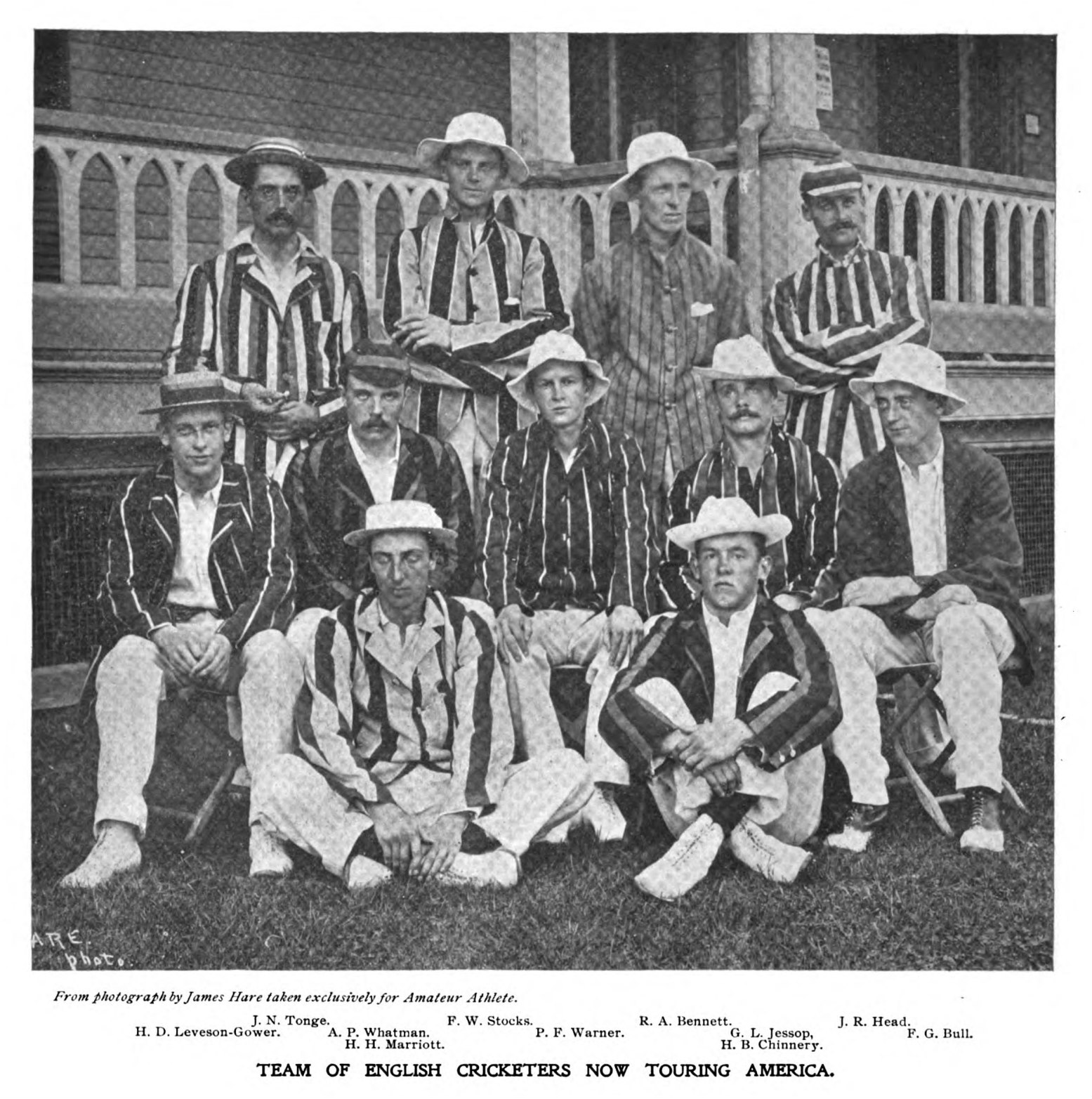
Warner, sitting in the middle, on North American tour in 1897.

He was named Wisden Cricketer of the Year in 1904 and also in 1921, making him one of two to have received the honour twice (the usual practice is that it is only won once: the other is Jack Hobbs). The second award marked his retirement as a county player after the 1920 season, in which he captained Middlesex to the County Championship title.

In the mid-1920s he was Chairman of Selectors, and in 1926 during industrial strife served as a Special Constable. He did not, however, play in another first-class fixture until 1926–27, when he captained the Marylebone Cricket Club (MCC) tour of Argentina, in which the four representative matches against the host nation were accorded first-class status. MCC scraped a win in the series by two games to one, with one match drawn. He played one more first-class match, in 1929 for the MCC against the Royal Navy.

=== Cricket management ===
After retiring as a player, he became a tour manager, most notably on the infamous "Bodyline" tour of Australia in 1932–33 in which he was reportedly opposed to the tactics and argued against their use. He was the chairman of the England Test selectors for several years in the 1930s. He later became President of the Marylebone Cricket Club. He was knighted for his services to cricket in 1937.

=== Cricket writing ===
Warner wrote extensively on cricket. He detailed his Ashes Tests and a history of Lord's Cricket Ground. He founded The Cricketer magazine. He was cricket correspondent of the Morning Post from 1921 to 1933, and subsequently of the Daily Telegraph.

== Family life ==
He married Agnes Charlotte Blyth in the summer of 1904 and had two sons, Esmond and John, and a daughter, Elizabeth. He died, aged 89, at West Lavington, West Sussex.

His brother Aucher Warner not only captained the first combined West Indies side in the West Indies during the 1896–97 season (playing against A. A. Priestley's XI and for Trinidad vs. Lord Hawke's touring team, which included Pelham Warner) but also the first West Indian touring side to England in 1900.

Marina Warner, novelist and mythographer, is his granddaughter.

Sporting positions
Preceded by Archie MacLaren	English national cricket captain 1903–04	Succeeded by Stanley Jackson
Preceded by Stanley Jackson	English national cricket captain 1905–06	Succeeded by Tip Foster
Preceded by Gregor MacGregor	Middlesex County Cricket Captain; 1908–20	Succeeded by Frank Mann

== Bibliography ==
- Lord's 1787–1945 ISBN 1-85145-112-9
