= West Indian Club =

Former gentlemen's club in London, England

The West Indian Club was a gentlemen's club established in London in 1898 which provided a social space for members who shared an interest in the British West Indies and British Guiana. One of its aims was "To afford facilities for organising, in connection with the West Indies and British Guiana, annual cricket matches and other kindred amusements recognised by our English Universities and Public Schools". – to which end a Sports Committee was founded.

== West Indian cricket team ==
The sports Committee was formed with Lord Hawke as chairperson. In June 1899 he circulated a letter to the Cricket clubs in the West Indies proposing a team drawn from these clubs be formed. He envisaged it having 14 members who would sign up for three months. They could then play against Marylebone Cricket Club and the leading county cricket clubs. He estimated this would cost about £2,500 including travel costs and the fees for the professional players. He suggested that the West Indian Club would be able to raise the money and requested that the clubs reply before November 1899 – when the MCC organised the schedule of matches for the following year, so that the plan could be brought to effect in 1900. Thus the first tour of a West Indies cricket team was organised. In the end the team consisted of 15 players, ten white and five non-white.
