= Charles William Warner =

Attorney General of Trinidad and Tobago (1805–1887)

Charles William Warner (19 October 1805 – 26/28 February 1887) was a Trinidadian lawyer who served as the Attorney General of Trinidad from 1845 to 1870. As attorney general he was considered the most powerful person in the colony after the governor. An angliciser who sought to make Trinidad more English, Warner played an important role in replacing the Spanish Law of the Indies in Trinidad with English law and in shaping education policy.

== Early life and education ==
Warner was born at sea on 19 October 1805, off the coast on St. Vincent. He was the oldest son of Edward Warner, an army officer and sugar planter who moved from Dominica to Trinidad in 1806 and his wife Catherine Jane Warner (who was the daughter of British army officer Sir Charles Shipley). (Note: The Legacies of British Slavery entry lists Catherine Jane Warner as the wife of Edward Warner and the grandmother of Pelham Francis Warner, but doesn't explicitly name her as the mother of Charles Warner.) Edward Warner, who historian Carl Campbell described as an "unsuccessful sugar planter", was the proprietor of Woodford Dale estate, a 600-acre (240 ha) estate in Savana Grande. The Warners were English Creoles who were descended from Sir Thomas Warner who had pioneered the English colonisation of St. Kitts in the seventeenth century. Warner's uncle, Ashton Warner, served as Chief Justice of Trinidad while Frederick Warner, who later served on the Legislative Council, was his cousin.

Charles Warner was sent to England for schooling where he attended Eton College.

== Early career ==
Warner returned to Trinidad in 1829 and worked as a licensed advocate before returning to England and being called to the Bar. He then returned to Trinidad where he practised as a barrister. According to Anthony Delamere, who wrote a brief history of the legal profession in Trinidad in 1899, Warner was the first lawyer in Trinidad to have studied in England. (Note: Selwyn Cudjoe quotes Anthony Delamere's book The Old Bar and the New Bar: Reminiscences 1820 – 1892.)

He served as acting Solicitor General for several periods between 1832 and 1834. From 1834 to 1840 he was the Syndic Procurador General (legal advisor) of the Illustrious Cabildo of Port of Spain. In 1839 he was appointed Solicitor General, and held that position until 1845, when he was appointed Attorney General of Trinidad. He remained in that position until 1870.

== Political role ==
Warner, an Anglican, was the leader of the pro-English Protestant movement which, according to Canadian historian James Keith Chapman, sought to make Trinidad "not simply a British possession but a British colony". Warner took a leading role in the campaign to anglicise Trinidad. In this role, he was responsible for shaping policy around immigration, education, and was responsible for anglicising the law, which until this time had been Spanish law.

As attorney general from 1845 to 1870, Warner had a role in shaping almost all legislation passed in this period. Carl Campbell described Warner as "the most powerful and influential man next to the Governors". The governors between George Harris, governor from 1846 to 1854, and Arthur Hamilton-Gordon, who was appointed governor in 1866, were weak and ineffective, and the Colonial Office took a hands-off approach to the administration of Trinidad. While Charles Elliot (1854–1857) and Robert Keate (1857–1864) served as Governor of Trinidad, Warner was considered the power behind the governor; according to Campbell "many people regarded him as the real governor". Between 1845 and 1865 government policy was "much what Warner decided it should be" according to Chapman. While governors served for relatively short periods of time, Warner's presence in the colony was permanent, and he was closely connected to the planter and commercial class. One of his opponents was the Catholic francophone Mayor of Port of Spain, Sir Louis de Verteuil who found Warner his "constant and unalterable rival".

== English law ==
The British captured Trinidad from the Spanish in 1797. As part of the Spanish surrender, the British agreed to preserve the Spanish Laws of the Indies. One of the first steps in the anglicisation of the law was instituted by Governor Ralph Woodford in 1814 when he required court proceedings and records to be in English. The establishment of the Council of Government (later the Legislative Council) in 1831 began a process of law making which gradually displaced Spanish law. Between 1838 and 1848 a series of ordinances replaced Spanish law with English law. In his role as attorney general, Warner led this process.

== Education policy ==
Warner was a proponent of the establishment of non-denominational schooling in Trinidad at a time when education was closely linked to religion and few thought education could function without the inclusion of religious instruction. Warner opposed the establishment of government-funded denominational schools in Trinidad because given the Catholic majority in the island, these would have been Catholic and either French or Spanish.

In 1838 Warner, then acting solicitor general, proposed to the Council of Government that the government support the Lady Mico Charity to establish non-denominational schools in Trinidad. This was opposed to the Lieutenant Governor, Sir George Hill, but after his death the following year Warner was able to convince the council to pledge support to the charity, but only on a limited basis with no promise of ongoing support. Warner envisioned both Catholics and Protestants attending these schools, and saw them as a means to promote social harmony and English culture. However, without adequate financial support, the Mico schools collapsed and the government instead provided support for Catholic and Anglican denominational schools.

When Sir Henry McLeod was appointed governor in 1840, Warner tried again to establish non-denominational schooling. In 1846, just before McLeod's departure, a plan was approved, but there was insufficient funding. McLeod's successor as governor, Lord Harris, was able to establish a system of government-funded non-denominational schools by dividing the island into wards, with local taxes collected in each ward going to support the schools. Historian Carl Campbell was unable to ascertain the degree to which Warner was involved in the establishment of the system of ward schools, despite its obvious connections to the plans worked out by Warner and McLeod.

After the system of ward schools was established, Warner worked to create educational opportunities in Trinidad for members of the upper class who would otherwise have sent their children to Britain or France. In 1859 the Government College was opened. It was staffed by graduates of the University of Cambridge and scholarships were provided annually to send the top two graduates to Cambridge.

== Later career ==
Governor Arthur Hamilton-Gordon took a less anti-Catholic stand in governance than his predecessors. This led to more conflict between Warner and the governor. Hamilton-Gordon considered appointing Warner chief justice as a way to moving him to a more prestigious but less powerful position, but the move was blocked by the Colonial Office.

In 1870, Warner was forced to resign as attorney general as a consequence of a financial scandal. Warner had pressured the executors of an estate to lend him the value of the estate with the understanding that he would pay interest to the heirs, and when they reached adulthood or married, he would repay the principal. When he failed to do so, one of the heirs petitioned for redress, and Warner was forced to resign and repay the loan.

After his resignation from the post of attorney general, Warner continued to practise law. He died in 1887.
