= Aucher Warner =

West Indian cricketer and Attorney-General of Trinidad and Tobago

Robert Stewart Aucher Warner (9 May 1859 – 1 December 1944) was Attorney-General of Trinidad and Tobago and a West Indian cricketer. He was known as Aucher Warner.

He was born the son of Charles William Warner, the Attorney-General of Trinidad and Tobago, and educated in Trinidad and at Oriel College, Oxford. He studied law at the Inner Temple, London and was called to the Bar in 1882. He was appointed an unofficial member of the Legislative Council of Trinidad and Tobago, an advisory body at the time, in March 1900. He became in turn Solicitor-General and Attorney-General of Trinidad and Tobago (1918). He left Trinidad for England in 1922.

== Cricketing career ==
He not only captained the first combined West Indies side in a first class match in the West Indies (during the 1896-97 season) but also the first West Indian touring side to England in 1900.

Apparently it was at his suggestion that the Inter-Colonial Tournament was instigated, however he himself only ever played two matches in the competition.

He made his debut in important matches playing for Trinidad against Slade Lucas's side in 1894-95 scoring 77 in his first innings. In 1896-97 he played in all four matches for Trinidad against the tourists, twice against Lord Hawke's team (which included his brother Plum and then twice against Priestley's side and also captained the combined West Indies against Priestley's XI.

He was captain of the first West Indian touring side to England in 1900 but contracted malarial fever and made only 7 appearances for the tourists. He had also toured Canada and the US with his brother Plum's team in 1898.

As well as his brother Plum he had another brother Charles who also played for Trinidad.
