= Hervey Lawrence =

English cricketer and British Army officer

- Born: 24 March 1881; Hadlow, Kent
- Died: 17 September 1975 (aged 94); Ely, Cambridgeshire
- Military career
- Allegiance: United Kingdom
- Branch: British Army
- Service years: 1901–1919
- Rank: Lieutenant colonel
- Unit: Cameronians (Scottish Rifles)
- Commands: 5 battalion Suffolk Regiment; 1/7 battalion Cheshire Regiment; 1 battalion Herefordshire Regiment
- Conflicts: Boer War; Gallipoli Campaign; First Battle of Gaza; Second Battle of Gaza; Battle of Beersheba; Battle of Jerusalem; Second Battle of the Marne; Battle of Soissons
- Awards: Distinguished Service Order & Bar; Croix de Chevalier Légion d'Honour; Officer of the Most Excellent Order of the British Empire

Lieutenant colonel Hervey Major Lawrence DSO & Bar OBE (24 March 1881 – 17 September 1975) was an English officer in the British Army and an amateur cricketer. He played seven first-class cricket matches between 1899 and 1914.

Lawrence served in the Boer War and in World War I when he commanded battalions in the Suffolk, Cheshire and Herefordshire Regiments. He won two Distinguished Service Orders and the Legion d'Honour during the war and was awarded an OBE in 1919. He died in 1975, the last remaining survivor of players who had played first-class county cricket before 1900.

== Early life ==
Lawrence was born at Hadlow in Kent in 1881, the son of Henry and Emily Lawrence. His father was a doctor. Lawrence was educated privately and commissioned as a 2nd Lieutenant in the 3rd militia battalion of the Cameronians in March 1900, as the battalion was being embodied for active service in the Second Boer War in South Africa.

== Army career ==
Lawrence served with the Cameronians in South Africa until 1902, winning the Queen's South Africa Medal. He was promoted to lieutenant in the 3rd battalion on 12 November 1900, but transferred as a second lieutenant to the 1st battalion, a regular army battalion, in 1901. From 1902 to 1905 Lawrence served in India during which he was promoted to the substantive rank of lieutenant, before transferring to be adjutant of the 5th battalion Suffolk Regiment, a Territorial Force battalion, in 1911.

During World War I Lawrence, who had been promoted to captain in 1913, served with the Suffolks as part of the 163rd Norfolk and Suffolk Brigade at Gallipoli from the Landing at Suvla Bay in August until the evacuation from Gallipoli in December 1915. He was promoted to major whilst in action at Gallipoli and then to temporary lieutenant colonel after the battalion was evacuated to Egypt, commanding the battalion. He transferred to become the commanding officer of the 1/7 battalion Cheshire regiment in 1916, seeing action during the Sinai and Palestine Campaign at the First Battle of Gaza in early 1917, capturing the hillside position at Ali Muntar for which he was awarded the Distinguished Service Order (DSO). He fought at Second Gaza and in the Battle of Beersheba later in 1917 before leading his battalion into Jerusalem in the advance guard.

Lawrence took charge of the 1st battalion Herefordshire Regiment and embarked for France. He fought at Second Marne and won a bar to his DSO during the battle, the award citation praising his "magnificent example of leadership and courage" in the action during which he was wounded in the side and the arm. The citation went on to say that "his personal influence had the most inspiring effect on officers and men". He went on to win the Légion d'Honour Croix de Chevalier for his leadership in support of a French attack near Soissons, but was then hospitalised in England and removed from the strength of the battalion in at the end of August. As well as his DSO and bar, he was mentioned in dispatches four times during the war.

After the war Lawrence retired in May 1919 and was awarded the OBE in the 1919 Birthday Honours. He remained in the Reserve of Officers, attached to the Suffolk Regiment until 1936 when he reached the age limit.

== Cricket career ==
Hervey Lawrence
Cricket information
- Batting: Right-handed
- Bowling: Right-arm medium-fast
- Role: Bowler

Domestic team information
- Years: Team
- 1899: Kent
- 1910–1914: Army
- 1913: Suffolk

Career statistics
Competition	First-class
Matches	7
Runs scored	49
Batting average	6.12
100s/50s	0/0
Top score	23
Balls bowled	976
Wickets	13
Bowling average	41.46
5 wickets in innings	0
10 wickets in match	0
Best bowling	4/37
Catches/stumpings	1/–
- Source: CricInfo, 8 March 2017

Lawrence played a total of seven first-class cricket matches between 1898 and 1911. He played four times for Kent County Cricket Club in 1899, having made an appearance for the county Second XI the previous year. Lawrence was primarily a bowler but Wisden reports that he "met little success" in his matches for the county, although he played widely in club cricket that year, taking over 200 wickets in all matches during the season.

On his return from India he played occasionally for Kent's Second XI between 1906 and 1909 before beginning to make appearances for Army teams. In 1910 and 1911 he played in one first-class match each year for an Army and Navy team against an Oxbridge team before playing one Army v Navy first-class match in June 1914. In 1913 he also appeared five times for Suffolk County Cricket Club in the Minor Counties Championship whilst he was serving with the Suffolk Regiment.

After the war Lawrence appeared occasionally for Bury and West Suffolk Cricket Club between 1927 and 1937 and played once for I Zingari in 1919.

== Later life ==
Lawrence married twice, firstly to Dorothy in November 1906 and then to Kathleen Galbraith in 1921. One of his sons, David Lawrence, played once for Suffolk in the Minor Counties Championship in 1936 and alongside his father twice for Bury and West Suffolk.

He died at Ely in Cambridgeshire in September 1975 aged 94. His Wisden obituary reported that he was "the last known survivor of those who played first-class county cricket before 1900".
