= George Camacho =

Guyanese cricketer (1918–2002)

Personal information
- Born: 16 October 1918; Georgetown, British Guiana
- Died: 6 May 2002 (aged 83); Burlington, Ontario, Canada
- Source: Cricinfo, 19 November 2020

George Camacho (16 October 1918 – 6 May 2002) was a Guyanese cricketer. He played in fifteen first-class matches for British Guiana from 1943 to 1954.

== See also ==
- List of Guyanese representative cricketers
