= A. A. Priestley's cricket team in the West Indies in 1896–97 =

A team of amateur cricketers under the captaincy of Arthur Priestley toured the West Indies in the 1896–97 season, playing matches between January and March 1897. They played a total of sixteen matches of which nine are regarded as first-class. They did not play in British Guiana.

== The team ==
A party of thirteen was taken:

- Arthur Priestley, captain
- Cyril Beldam
- Frederick Bush
- Gilbert Elliott
- James Leigh
- Legh Barratt
- Richard Lewis
- Richard Palairet
- Henry Stanley
- Andrew Stoddart
- Charles Stone
- Billy Williams
- Sammy Woods

Bush, Barratt and Priestley had been in the Slade Lucas's tour to the West Indies two years previously. Priestley had played a single first-class match for the M.C.C. in 1895 but otherwise none of the three had played first-class cricket between the two tours. Elliott had not played first-class cricket before the tour while Williams and Leigh had not played first-class cricket for almost 10 years. However the remaining seven had played first-class cricket in 1896, and so the team was clearly stronger than Lucas's two years earlier. In 1896 Palairet, Stanley and Woods had played for Somerset, Beldam and Stoddart for Middlesex, Stone for Leicestershire and Lewis for Oxford University. Stoddart had played for England during the 1896 season while Woods had played against South Africa in 1895–96. All the 13 played at least three first-class matches on the tour. G.A. Maclean played in a minor match.

== The tour ==
The team left Southampton on 30 December and arrived back in England on 14 April.

Matches played were:

- January 13, 14 : v Barbados
- 15, 16 January : v St. Vincent (in Barbados)
- 18, 19 January : v Barbados
- 21, 22, 23 January : v Barbados
- 28, 29, 30 January : v Antigua
- 1, 2, 3 February : v St. Kitts
- 6, 8 February : v United Services (in Barbados)
- 12, 13 February : v Queen's Park (in Trinidad)
- 15, 16, 18 February : v All West Indies (in Trinidad)
- 19, 20, 22 February : v Trinidad
- 25, 26, 27 February : v Trinidad
- 13, 15 March : v All Jamaica, 12-a-side
- 16, 17 March : v All Jamaica
- 19, 20 March : v Black River C.C. (in Jamaica) 12-a-side
- 24, 25 March : v North Side (in Jamaica) 12-a-side
- 27, 29 March : v All Jamaica, 12-a-side

First class matches are highlighted.

Of the nine first class matches, four were won and five lost. Overall 10 matches were won, 5 lost and 1 drawn. All 5 matches in Jamaica were won, Gilbert Livingston being the only effective player for Jamaica. The results achieved by the tourists were regarded as disappointing, Stoddart being the one great success.

Stoddart was the leading batsman, scoring over 1000 runs in all games at an average of over 50. In first-class matches he scored 416 runs at an average of 27. He scored all six of the centuries scored by the tourists including two in first-class games. Stoddart was also the leading bowling with over 100 wickets in all matches at an average under 8 and over 50 in first-class games alone averaging under 10.

The most important match was that against All West Indies in Port of Spain in February. The West Indies team contained players from Trinidad, British Guiana and Barbados and was captained by Aucher Warner, the brother of Plum Warner. The tourists set their opponents 141 to win in the last innings which they achieved for the loss of 7 wickets, having been 41 for 6 at one stage. Richard Palairet was leading scorer in both the tourists' innings with 45 and 46. Clifford Goodman and Archie Cumberbatch took nine wickets each for the West Indians, as did Andrew Stoddart for the tourists. The leading batsmen for the West Indies were Harold Austin and Lebrun Constantine.

== Averages ==
The following averages are from the nine first class matches (Batting Bowling).

=== Batting ===
Player	P	I	NO	R	HS	Ave	100	50	C/S
AE Stoddart	9	15	0	416	143	27.73	2	–	10
RCN Palairet	8	14	1	336	65*	25.84	–	1	8
FW Bush	8	13	1	169	45*	14.08	–	–	6
SMJ Woods	9	14	0	193	28	13.78	–	–	8
G Elliott	5	8	2	78	36*	13.00	–	–	3
CA Beldam	7	11	2	115	24*	12.77	–	–	3
J Leigh	8	13	0	149	26	11.46	–	–	4
L Barratt	9	15	0	171	38	11.40	–	–	7
HT Stanley	9	15	0	151	38	10.06	–	–	6
W Williams	9	15	3	98	40	8.16	–	–	6
CC Stone	3	6	1	38	16*	7.60	–	–	–
RP Lewis	8	12	7	16	7	3.20	–	–	7/6
AA Priestley	9	15	1	37	9	2.64	–	–	5

=== Bowling ===
Player	O	M	R	W	BB	Ave	5i	10m
AE Stoddart	303.4	128	520	53	7–67	9.81	5	2
W Williams	203.2	55	464	43	7–38	10.79	3	1
SMJ Woods	230.2	75	501	35	6–60	14.31	2	–
HT Stanley	9	2	39	2	2–20	19.50	–	–
G Elliott	12	3	29	1	1–13	29.00	–	–
FW Bush	102.4	19	245	8	2–15	30.62	–	–
L Barratt	113	41	225	6	3–40	37.50	–	–
CA Beldam	11	1	54	1	1–30	54.00	–	–
CC Stone	4	2	8	0				
J Leigh	3.2	0	14	0				

== See also ==
- Lord Hawke's cricket team in the West Indies in 1896–97 for reasons for the 'twin' tours.

== External sources ==
- CricketArchive

== Annual reviews ==
- James Lillywhite's Cricketers' Annual 1898 page 53
- Wisden Cricketers' Almanack 1898, pages 396 to 404
