= History of cricket in the West Indies to 1918 =

This article describes the history of West Indies cricket to 1918.

== Historical background ==
The development of cricket in all countries has been shaped by historical events but perhaps nowhere else is this more so than in the West Indies where not only colonialism, but also slavery shaped society.

In 1492, the "New World" was discovered by a Spanish naval expedition under Columbus which reached the Caribbean Sea and found the Bahamas; and hence the creation of the West Indies.

In 1609, the first British settlement in the West Indies was on Bermuda by shipwrecked English colonists originally bound for Virginia. The settlement became permanent in 1612. In 1623, the first British colony in the Caribbean itself was established at St Kitts in the Leeward Islands. In 1628, British colonists began to settle on Barbados which had been uninhabited. Sugar plantations were soon developed and large numbers of African slaves were brought in to work them. Another British colony was established on Nevis. In 1632, more British colonies were established on Montserrat, Antigua and Barbuda.

We do not know when or where cricket was first played in the West Indies but it is reasonable to assume that it was introduced by these early colonists.

1655 is a significant year in British colonisation of the West Indies for its forces under Admiral Sir William Penn and General Robert Venables seized the Spanish island of Jamaica, full colonisation commencing in 1661. The cultivation of sugar cane and coffee by African slave labour made Jamaica one of the most valuable possessions in the world for more than 150 years. The colony's slaves, who outnumbered their white masters 300,000 to 30,000 by 1800, mounted over a dozen major slave conspiracies and uprisings between 1673 and 1832.

By the 1660s, British holdings in the West Indies included Jamaica, Barbados, Bermuda, Bahamas, St Kitts, Nevis, Anguilla, Montserrat, Antigua and Barbuda.

Great Britain's other West Indies territories came into the story later.

The islands of Dominica, Grenada, St Vincent and the Grenadines were initially claimed by France in the 17th century but were all ceded to Great Britain under the terms of the Treaty of Paris 1763 that ended the Seven Years' War.

St Lucia was first colonised by France in 1660 but seized by the British in 1663. It was then the subject of no less than 14 separate conflicts between the two before Britain finally secured control in 1814 at the end of the Napoleonic War.

The group now known as the British Virgin Islands had been settled by the Dutch in 1648 but they were annexed by the British in 1672. Sugar cane was introduced by the British and it soon became the main crop. Initially, labour was indented by 'transported' British convicts and from Ireland. African slaves were introduced in the mid-seventeenth century.

Guyana was first settled by the Dutch, who established three separate colonies at Essequibo (1616), Berbice (1627) and Demerara (1752). The British assumed control in 1796 and, following counter-revolts, the Dutch formally ceded the area in 1814. The three became a single British colony known as British Guiana in 1831. There were major slave revolts in 1763, and also in 1823. The Guyana plantations were originally coffee and cotton but, as elsewhere in the Caribbean area, sugar eventually superseded them.

Trinidad and Tobago were found by Columbus in 1498. Although Spanish settlement of Trinidad began in the sixteenth century, the population in 1783 was only 2,763 with the majority being Amerindians. In 1783, the proclamation of a Cedula of Population by the Spanish Crown granted 32 acres (130,000 m^{2}) of land to each Catholic who settled in Trinidad and half as much for each slave that they brought. Uniquely, 16 acres (65,000 m^{2}) was offered to each Free Coloured or Free Person of Colour and half as much for each slave they brought. In the tumult of the Haitian and French Revolutions, many people migrated from the French islands to Trinidad. This resulted in Trinidad having the unique feature of a large Free Coloured slave-owning class. By the time the island was surrendered to the British in 1797 the population had increased to 17,643: 2,086 whites, 1,082 free people of colour, 1,082 Amerindians, and 10,009 African slaves. Spanish rule over the island, which nominally began in 1498, ended when the final Spanish Governor, Don José Maria Chacón surrendered the island to a British fleet of 18 warships under the command of Sir Ralph Abercrombie on 18 February 1797.

Tobago's development was similar to other plantation islands in the Lesser Antilles but quite different from that of Trinidad. During the colonial period, French, Dutch, British and Courlanders (Latvians) fought over possession of Tobago and the island changed hands 22 times: more often than any other West Indian island. Tobago was finally ceded to Great Britain in 1814. The two islands were incorporated into a single Crown Colony in 1888 with Tobago reduced to the status of a Ward of Trinidad.

The Slave Trade Act 1807 was passed by the British Parliament on 25 March 1807. The act imposed a fine of £100 for every slave found aboard a British ship. The intention was to entirely outlaw the slave trade within the British Empire. In 1827, Britain declared that participation in the slave trade was piracy and punishable by death.

On 23 August 1833, the Slavery Abolition Act 1833 outlawed slavery in all British colonies. On 1 August 1834, all slaves in the British Empire were emancipated. Some remained indentured to their former owners in an apprenticeship system which was finally abolished in 1838. £20 million was paid in compensation to plantation owners in the Caribbean. From then on indented labour from India, China and elsewhere was imported. This created the ethnic pot pourri of the region's population.

== Early cricket references ==
The game was taken to the West Indies by British colonists and soldiers.

- 1780s – the Barbados Cricket Buckle, depicting a mulatto batsman wearing a slave collar being bowled out, suggests that slaves in the West Indies were playing cricket as early as 1780.
- On 10 May 1806, a meeting of St Anne's Cricket Club in Barbados was announced in the 'Barbados Mercury' to take play on 12 May
- 1842 – Trinidad Cricket Club already "of very long standing"
- 1850 – cricket being played by the pupils of St. George's College, Kingston, Jamaica
- 1857 – Vere and Clarendon Cricket Clubs founded in Jamaica, neither last long
- 1858 – formation of Georgetown Cricket Club in British Guiana
- 1861 – first full score of a Barbados match: St Michael's Club against The Lodge School
- 1863 – Kingston Cricket Club founded in Jamaica

== 1865 to 1890 ==
Inter-Colonial matches were sporadic in the early years of West Indian cricket, mainly because of travel difficulties between the islands and there were only 10 such matches up to 1890, involving Barbados, British Guiana and Trinidad. These ten games are generally regarded as first-class matches.

The British Guiana team was often referred to as Demerara and the two names seem to have been interchangeable at first. British Guiana is used here throughout until the country was renamed as Guyana.

=== Earliest first-class matches ===
The 1864–65 season included the inaugural first-class match in the West Indies between Barbados and British Guiana at Garrison Savannah in Bridgetown on 15–16 February 1865. Barbados won a low scoring match by 138 runs. Augustus and Frederick Smith, two uncles of Sydney Smith took the wickets for Barbados and dismissed British Guiana for 22 and 38.

Edwin Beete, one of the British Guiana side, was later quoted as follows: On the Friday morning we went to the Garrison and practised on the pitch there. Consequently the islanders had to prepare a pitch on the Savannah. And such a pitch! The outfield was very high with grass, you could not run after a ball. The pitch itself was so studded with small pieces of corral that the ball had to be changed twice in an innings which lasted about two hours and mangled balls were brought back as a memento. We practised on Saturday and the match was fixed for the Monday and Tuesday following but was postponed until the Wednesday and Thursday.

A return match was arranged for the following season in September 1865. Barbados batted first and scored 111 with Thomas Daly taking 4–30 bowling underarm. In reply British Guiana were all out for 82 which included 34 extras, George Whitehall taking 4–16. British Guiana were then set 146 to win which they made with 2 wickets remaining, William Watson batting throughout for 39*. As in the previous match the Smith brothers took most of the wickets for Barbados.

After this game, various social events were organised including a boat trip on the steamer Berbice up the Essequebo River to the Penal Settlement at the junction of the Cuyuni and Massaruni Rivers and to take place from 18 to 20 September. A trip up the Massaruni was arranged in three smaller boats and during this it was decided to shoot the Koestrabraek Falls. One of the boats, the Lady Wodehouse, capsized in the falls and seven people were drowned including two of the British Guiana team, Henry Beresford and Richard Stewart.

=== Matches and events to 1890 ===
- British Guiana played two matches in Trinidad in January 1869. Trinidad won the first by 5 wickets and British Guiana the second by 27 runs.
- September 1871 – Barbados defeated British Guiana by 8 wickets
- October 1876 – Trinidad defeated British Guiana by an innings and 28 runs
- September 1882 – British Guiana defeated Trinidad by an innings and 6 runs. The highlight of this match was the first century in senior West Indian cricket by Edward Fortescue Wright, who scored 123 out of the British Guiana total of 168.
- September 1883 – Barbados defeated British Guiana by 6 wickets
- A West Indian side toured North America in August and September 1886 and played 12 two-day matches mostly against club sides, 6 matches being played in Canada and 6 in the United States plus an additional fill-up game in the US. A return tour by the gentlemen of the US following in 1887–88. The tourists were not at all representative of the strength of the US at the time. Neither of these two tours is regarded as first-class but they are important in being the first tours involving West Indies teams.
- September 1887 – Barbados lost twice to British Guiana by 108 runs and by 6 wickets.

== West Indian cricket to 1918 ==
=== Inter-Colonial Tournament ===
The 1891–92 season saw the first Inter-Colonial Tournament in the West Indies take place in Barbados between Barbados, British Guiana and Trinidad. Matches took place at the Wanderers Ground, Bay Pasture in Bridgetown between 1 and 10 September 1891. Barbados beat British Guiana by 4 wickets, British Guiana beat Trinidad by 151 runs and Barbados beat Trinidad by an innings and 93 runs. The final was then contested between Barbados and British Guiana. Barbados won this match by an innings and 55 runs.

During this tournament a suggestion was made by Hon. Aucher Warner that there should be a regular series of matches between the three colonies to be played alternately at each colony. By the time of the next tournament in 1893 a cup had been subscribed for but British Guiana were unable to take part, Barbados being winners again. This 1893 match is regarded as the first proper tournament because of the trophy being awarded.

The inter-colonial tournament was restricted to amateurs and that this excluded many of the leading black cricketers who were often professionals. In addition, because of the distances and travelling costs involved, Jamaica never took part in the tournament.

The tournaments took place irregularly until the Second World War, winners to 1918 being:

- 1891–92 – Barbados
- 1893–94 – Barbados
- 1895–96 – British Guiana
- 1897–98 – Barbados
- 1899–1900 – Barbados
- 1901–02 – Trinidad
- 1903–04 – Trinidad
- 1905–06 – Barbados
- 1907–08 – Trinidad
- 1908–09 – Barbados
- 1909–10 – Trinidad
- 1910–11 – Barbados
- 1911–12 – Barbados

=== English tours of the West Indies ===
The 1894–95 season featured the first tour of the West Indies by an English team. This was a team of amateurs captained by R Slade Lucas. They played a total of 16 matches between January and April 1895 of which eight are considered first-class matches. See: R. S. Lucas' cricket team in the West Indies in 1894–95.

The 1896–97 season had two English teams on tour. See: A. A. Priestley's cricket team in the West Indies in 1896–97 and Lord Hawke's cricket team in the West Indies in 1896–97. There were further privately organised tours in the next ten years: R. A. Bennett's cricket team in the West Indies in 1901–02 and Lord Brackley's cricket team in the West Indies in 1904–05.

The first team organised by MCC arrived in 1910–11 and played twelve matches, eleven of which are first-class. See: English cricket team in West Indies in 1910-11.

Another MCC team toured in 1912–13. See: English cricket team in West Indies in 1912-13.

=== Philadelphian tour ===
See: Philadelphian cricket team in Jamaica in 1908-09
