= Inter-Colonial Tournament =

The Inter-Colonial Tournament was the main first class cricket competition in the West Indies held between 1892–93 and 1938-39.

== Competing teams ==
- Barbados
- British Guiana
- Trinidad

In the early tournaments British Guiana were sometimes referred to as Demerara. For simplicity British Guiana is used in the article.

The tournament was restricted to amateurs. This excluded many of the leading black cricketers who were often Professionals.

== Origins ==
A tournament between Barbados, British Guiana and Trinidad took place in 1891. Each team played the other, and then there was a final between the leading two teams. During this tournament a suggestion was made by Hon. Aucher Warner that there should be a regular series of matches between the three colonies to be played alternately at each colony.

By the time of the next tournament in 1893, a cup had been subscribed for, but British Guiana were unable to take part, Barbados being winners again. This 1893 match is regarded as the first proper tournament.

Barbados as winners of the 1893 tournament were automatic finalists for the 1895 tournament, the other two teams playing to decide who would play them. The same procedure was used in the subsequent tournaments.

Due to travel costs and logistics of travelling to the other colonies, Jamaica never took part in the Inter-Colonial Tournament.

== Results ==
Series	Dates	Season	Finalists		Hosts	Venue
Series	Dates	Season	Winner	Loser	Hosts	Venue
	1–10 Sep 1891	1891–92	Barbados	Trinidad	Barbados	Bay Pasture, Bridgetown
1st	15–18 Sep 1893	1893–94	Barbados	Trinidad	Trinidad	Queen's Park Savannah, Port of Spain
2nd	29 Aug-4 Sep 1895	1895–96	British Guiana	Barbados	British Guiana	Bourda, Georgetown
3rd	7–14 Sep 1897	1897–98	Barbados	British Guiana	Barbados	Kensington Oval, Bridgetown
4th	10–18 Jan 1900	1899-1900	Barbados	British Guiana	Trinidad	Queen's Park Oval, Port of Spain
5th	18–24 Sep 1901	1901–02	Trinidad	Barbados	British Guiana	Bourda, Georgetown
6th	20–28 Jan 1904	1903–04	Trinidad	Barbados	Barbados	Kensington Oval, Bridgetown
7th	8–14 Jan 1906	1905–06	Barbados	Trinidad	Trinidad	Queen's Park Oval, Port of Spain
8th	12–18 Sep 1907	1907–08	Trinidad	Barbados	British Guiana	Bourda, Georgetown
9th	13–21 Jan 1909	1908–09	Barbados	Trinidad	Barbados	Kensington Oval, Bridgetown
10th	19–27 Jan 1910	1909–10	Trinidad	Barbados	Trinidad	Queen's Park Oval, Port of Spain
11th	19–27 Sep 1910	1910–11	Barbados	Trinidad	British Guiana	Bourda, Georgetown
12th	12–20 Jan 1912	1911–12	Barbados	Trinidad	Barbados	Kensington Oval, Bridgetown
13th	14–24 Sep 1921	1921–22	Unfinished		Trinidad	Queen's Park Oval, Port of Spain
14th	23 Sep-2 Oct 1922	1922–23	Barbados	Trinidad	British Guiana	Bourda, Georgetown
15th	14–22 Feb 1924	1923–24	Barbados	Trinidad	Barbados	Kensington Oval, Bridgetown
16th	6–16 Feb 1925	1924–25	Trinidad	Barbados	Trinidad	Queen's Park Oval, Port of Spain
17th	1–12 Oct 1926	1925–26	Trinidad	British Guiana	British Guiana	Bourda, Georgetown
18th	17 Jan-1 Feb 1927	1926–27	Barbados	Trinidad	Barbados	Kensington Oval, Bridgetown
19th	31 Jan-7 Feb 1929	1928–29	Trinidad	Barbados	Trinidad	Queen's Park Oval, Port of Spain
20th	24 Sep-8 Oct 1929	1929–30	British Guiana	Trinidad	British Guiana	Bourda, Georgetown
21st	16–29 Jan 1932	1931–32	Trinidad	British Guiana	Barbados	Kensington Oval, Bridgetown
22nd	26 Jan-9 Feb 1934	1933–34	Trinidad	Barbados	Trinidad	Queen's Park Oval, Port of Spain
23rd	21 Sep-3 Oct 1934	1934–35	British Guiana	Trinidad	British Guiana	Bourda, Georgetown
24th	29 Jan-7 Feb 1936	1935–36	British Guiana	Trinidad	Barbados	Kensington Oval, Bridgetown
25th	16–29 Jan 1937	1936–37	Trinidad	British Guiana	Trinidad	Queen's Park Oval, Port of Spain
26th	27 Sep-9 Oct 1937	1937–38	British Guiana	Trinidad	British Guiana	Bourda, Georgetown
27th	7–14 Jan 1939	1938–39	Trinidad	British Guiana	Barbados	Kensington Oval, Bridgetown

British Guiana did not take part in 1893–94. The 13th series was unfinished, the final between Trinidad and Barbados being left drawn with the Barbados team needing to catch the boat home.

Initially the tournament was held every two years but after the 8th series it became an annual event although a number of years were missed for various reasons.

== Summary ==
Of the 27 official series Trinidad won 11, Barbados won 10 and British Guiana won 5 with one unfinished.

Trinidad competed in 24 of the 27 finals, Barbados 19 and British Guiana 11.

In matches between Trinidad and Barbados, Trinidad won 11 and Barbados won 9 with 1 drawn. In matches between Trinidad and British Guiana, Trinidad won 13 and British Guiana won 6. In matches between Barbados and British Guiana, Barbados won 8 and British Guiana won 5.
