= Lord Hawke's cricket team in the West Indies in 1896–97 =

A team of Amateurs under the captaincy of Lord Hawke toured the West Indies in the 1896–97 season playing matches between January and April 1897. They played a total of 14 matches of which 7 are regarded as first class. They did not play in Jamaica.

== Background ==
Lord Hawke had been invited to take the 1894–95 team to the West Indies but had had to withdraw, the team being captained instead by R. Slade Lucas. It was understood however that he would try to take a side out in 1896–97 and following an invitation he set about organising a tour. But his telegram accepting the invitation was never received and another group of tourists under A. A. Priestley having accepted an invitation from Jamaica were organising their own tour.

Lord Hawke met Priestley but the two could not come to a compromise and both decided to go independently. It would appear from the correspondence published that Lord Hawke treated Priestley in a rather high-handed manner.

== Tour ==
A party of 12 was taken:

- Lord Hawke, Captain
- Mr. G. R. Bardswell
- Mr. R. Berens
- Mr. H. R. Bromley-Davenport
- Mr. J. M. Dawson
- Mr. C. Heseltine
- Mr. A. E. Leatham
- Mr. H. D. G. Leveson-Gower
- Mr. W. H. Wakefield
- Mr. P. F. Warner
- Mr. A. D. Whatman
- Mr. R. W. Wickham

Berens, Bromley-Davenport, Dawson and Wakefield had been in the Lucas tour to the West Indies two years previously. Bromley-Davenport had played regularly for Middlesex in 1896 and also against South Africa in 1895-96 but the other 3 had not played first-class cricket between the two tours. Whatman and Wickham had not played first-class cricket before the tour while Heseltine had played first-class cricket in 1895 but not in 1896. The remaining 5 had played first class cricket in 1896 and so, like Priestley's tourists, the team was somewhat stronger than Lucas's two years earlier. In 1896 Lord Hawke had played for Yorkshire, Bardswell for Oxford University and Lancashire, Leatham a single match for M.C.C., Leveson-Gower for Oxford University and a single match for Surrey and Warner for Oxford University and 4 matches for Middlesex. Lord Hawke and Heseltine had also played against South Africa in 1895-96. All the 12 played at least three first-class matches on the tour. Oscar Weber played in the last match of the tour against British Guiana. He had previously played for All West Indies against A.A. Priestley's XI. Mr. St. G.M. de Roebuck and Capt. Hon. M. Bourke played in a minor match.

The team left Southampton on January 13.

Matches played were:

- January 29, 30 : v Queen's Park C.C. (in Trinidad) 12-a-side
- February 1, 2, 3 : v Trinidad
- February 5, 6 : v Trinidad
- February 10, 11 : v St. George's C.C. (in Grenada) 12-a-side
- February 12, 13 : v Grenada
- February 15, 16, 17 : v St. Vincent
- February 25, 26, 27 : v Barbados
- March 2, 3, 4 : v Barbados
- March 11, 12 : v Antigua
- March 15, 16 : v St. Kitts
- March 19 : v St. Lucia
- March 26, 27, 29 : v British Guiana
- April 1, 2, 3 : v British Guiana
- April 12, 13, 14 : v British Guiana

First-class matches are highlighted.

Of the 7 first-class matches, 3 were won, 2 lost and 2 drawn. Overall 9 matches were won, 2 lost and 3 drawn. The tourists had a break from cricket between the last matches when they sailed up the Demerara river.

Warner was the great success amongst the batsmen scoring 984 runs including 4 centuries in all matches. Bardswell and Leveson-Gower were also successful in the first-class games.

Bromley-Davenport was the most successful bowler but missed a number of matches with a broken finger.

== Averages ==
The following averages are in the 7 first class matches, Batting: and Bowling.

=== Batting ===
Player	P	I	NO	R	HS	Ave	100	50	C/S
PF Warner	7	13	3	407	113*	40.70	1	1	1
GR Bardswell	6	11	2	350	77	38.88	-	4	18
HDG Leveson-Gower	7	10	1	266	136	29.55	1	-	2
WH Wakefield	7	9	7	45	19*	22.50	-	-	8/1
AD Whatman	7	11	2	165	67	18.33	-	1	3
R Berens	7	11	1	143	23	14.30	-	-	1
HR Bromley-Davenport	5	6	0	80	52	13.33	-	1	6
Lord Hawke	7	9	0	113	26	12.55	-	-	6
AE Leatham	7	9	0	100	43	11.11	-	-	4
C Heseltine	6	9	0	74	21	8.22	-	-	10
RW Wickham	7	9	2	54	20*	7.71	-	-	5
JM Dawson	3	4	0	12	10	3.00	-	-	3
OW Weber	1	0							-

Weber was a local who played in other first class matches during the season.

=== Bowling ===
Player	O	M	R	W	BB	Ave	5i	10m
HR Bromley-Davenport	162.3	59	376	30	6-46	12.53	3	-
C Heseltine	265	97	497	32	4-38	15.53	-	-
HDG Leveson-Gower	143.1	17	400	24	6-49	16.66	3	-
RW Wickham	194.4	54	457	24	5-38	19.04	1	-
PF Warner	60.3	16	151	6	2-31	25.16	-	-
AE Leatham	36	5	117	4	3-38	29.25	-	-
GR Bardswell	13	4	35	-				

== See also ==
- A. A. Priestley's cricket team in the West Indies in 1896–97 for details of the other tour.

== External sources ==
- CricketArchive
- Cricinfo - A Tale of Two Tours

== Annual reviews ==
- James Lillywhite's Cricketers' Annual 1898 page 53
- Wisden Cricketers' Almanack 1898, pages 387 to 395
