= Whitwell =

Whitwell may refer to:

== Places ==
=== UK ===
- Whitwell, Derbyshire
  - Whitwell Common, Derbyshire
- Whitwell, Hertfordshire
- Whitwell, Isle of Wight
- Whitwell and Reepham railway station, Norfolk
- Whitwell, North Yorkshire, near Catterick
- Whitwell, Rutland
- Whitwell-on-the-Hill, in between York and Malton
- Whitwell House, County Durham

=== US ===
- Whitwell, Tennessee

== People ==
- Allan Whitwell (born 1954), English Olympic rower
- John Whitwell (1812–1880), English Liberal politician
- Field Marshal John Griffin Whitwell, 4th Baron Howard de Walden (1719–1797), British nobleman and soldier
- Joseph Whitwell (1869–1932), English amateur first-class cricketer
- Mike Whitwell, American football player
- Philip Whitwell Wilson (1875–1956), British Liberal politician, writer and journalist
- R. J. Whitwell (1859–1928), British medievalist
- Sally Whitwell (born 1974), Australian pianist
- Thomas Stedman Whitwell (1784–1840), English architect
- William Whitwell (1867–1942), English amateur first-class cricketer
