= Radley College =

Public school in Radley, England

Coordinates: 51.69304°N 1.25150°W

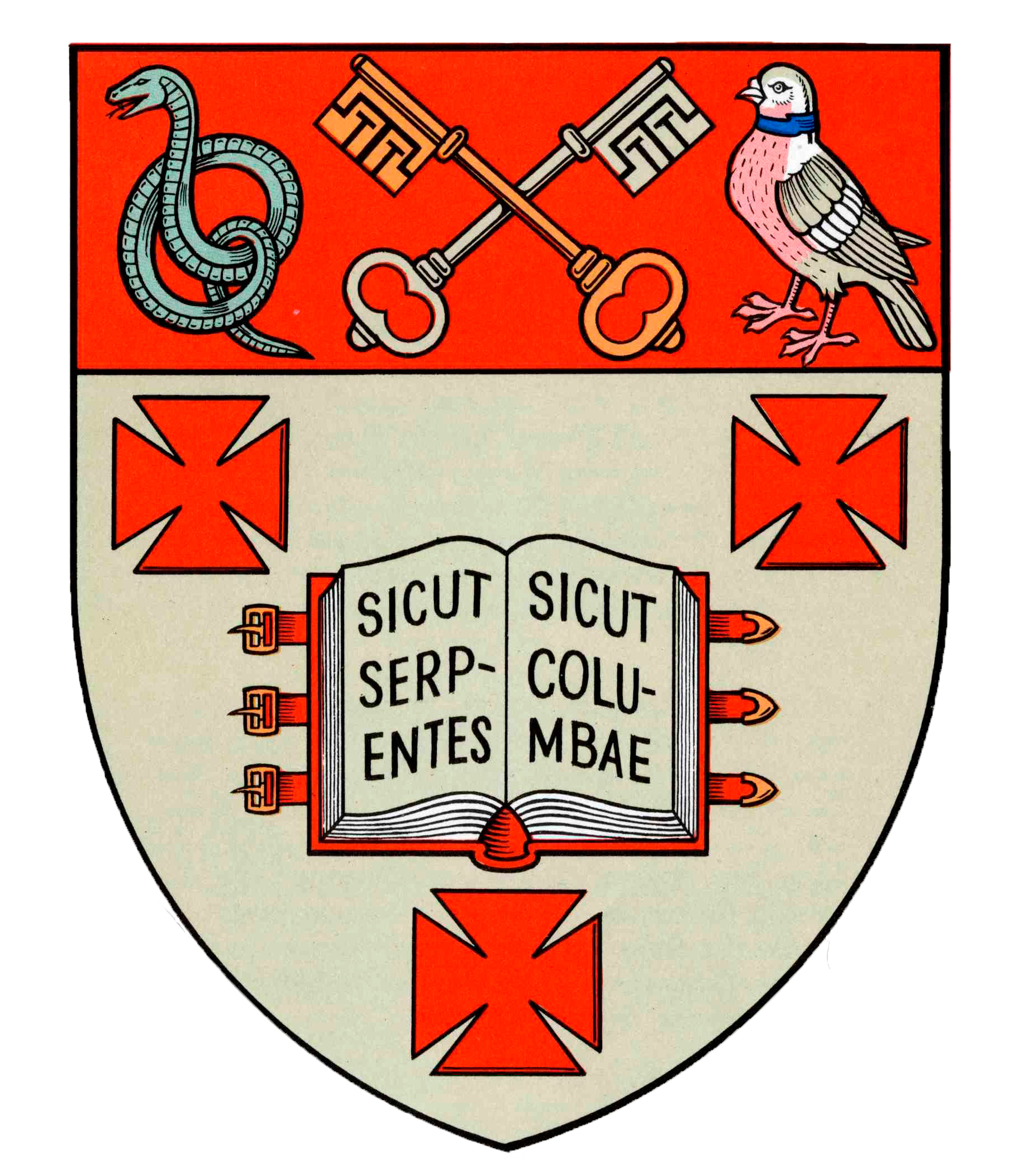

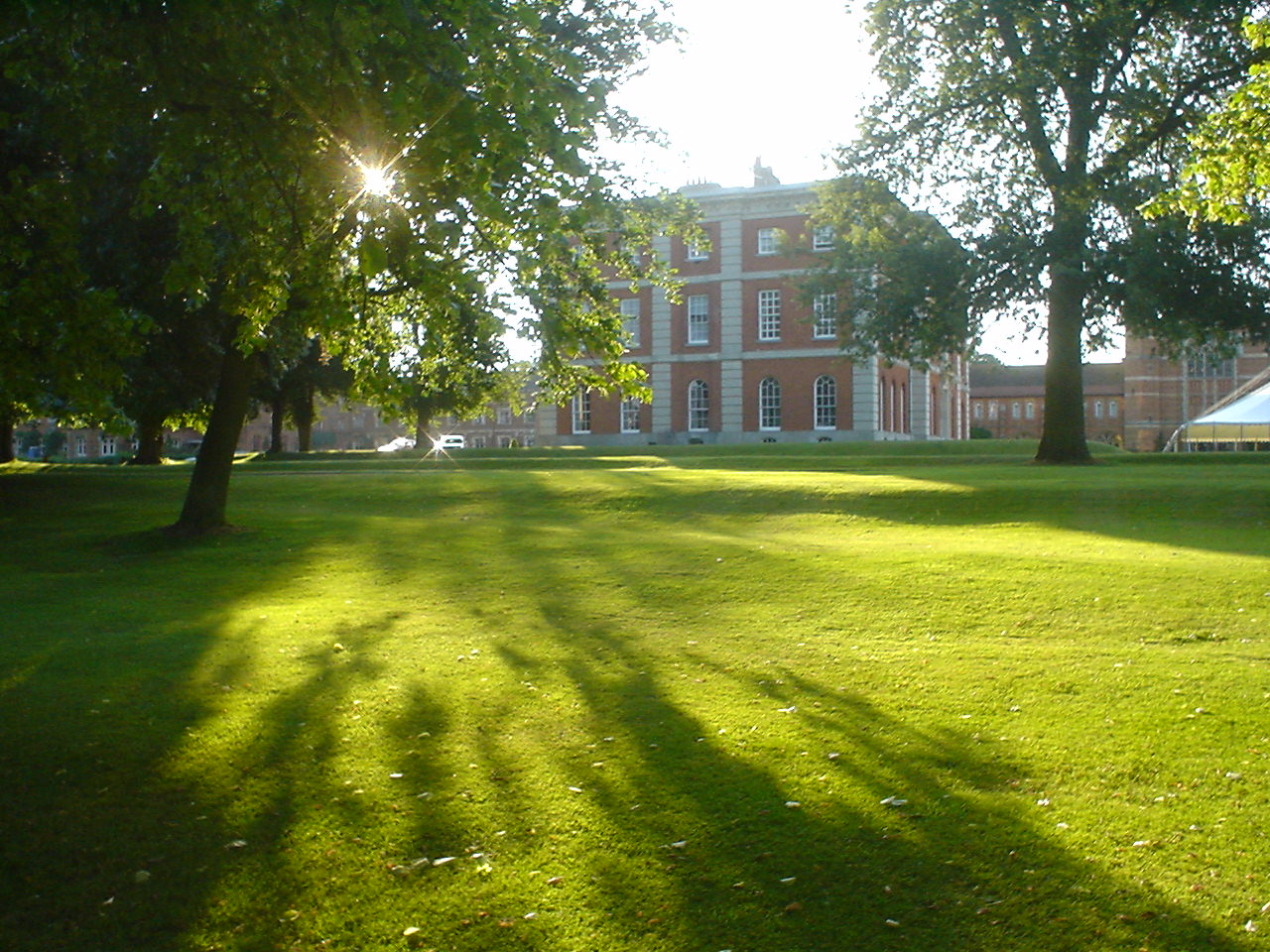

Location
- Kennington Road; Radley, Oxfordshire, OX14 2HR; England

Information
- Type: Public school Private school Boarding school
- Motto: Latin: Sicut serpentes, sicut columbae ([wise] as serpents, [innocent] as doves [Matthew 10:16])
- Religious affiliation: Church of England
- Established: 1847; 179 years ago
- Founder: William Sewell
- Department for Education URN: 123300 Tables
- Chairman of the Council: David Smellie
- Warden: John Moule
- Gender: Boys
- Age: 13 to 18
- Enrolment: 770
- Student to teacher ratio: 7:1
- Houses: 11
- Colours: Red; White
- Publication: The Radleian
- Budget: £43,670,000 (2025)
- Revenue: £47,643,000 (2025)
- Alumni: Old Radleians (ORs)
- Campus: 800-acre (3.2 km^{2}) rural campus
- Affiliations: HMC; The Rugby Group
- Website: www.radley.org.uk

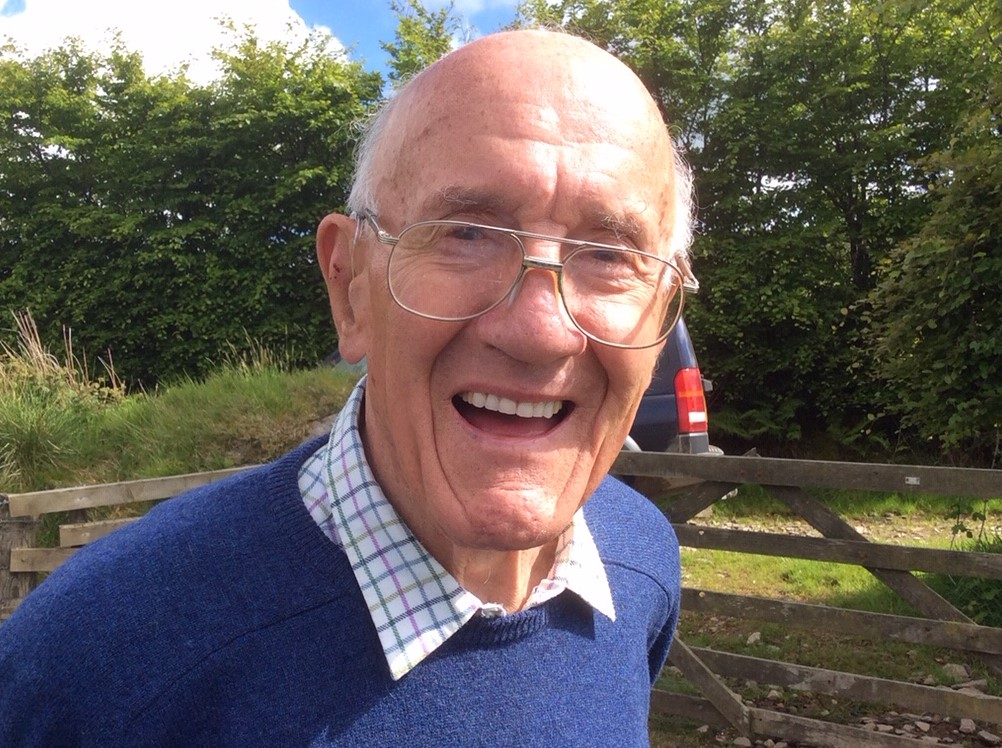
Dennis Silk, the Warden from 1968 to 1991, was credited in the 20th century with transforming Radley from "a pretty ordinary place" to one of the best public schools.

Radley College, formally St Peter's College, Radley or the College of St Peter at Radley, is an English public school providing boarding education for boys aged 13–18, near the village of Radley, in Oxfordshire, in the United Kingdom. It was founded in 1847. The school covers 800 acres (320 hectares) including playing fields, a golf course, a lake, and farmland. Before the counties of England were re-organised, the school was in Berkshire.

Radley is one of three public schools in the UK which have retained both the boys-only, boarding-only tradition, the others being Harrow School and Eton College. Formerly this group included Sherborne School which now offers day places and Winchester College, which offers day places in the Sixth Form and is intended to transition to co-educational status in September 2026. Of the seven public schools addressed by the Public Schools Act 1868 four have since become co-educational: Rugby School (1976), Charterhouse School (1971), Westminster School (1973), and Shrewsbury School (2014). For the academic year 2022/23, Radley charged boarders up to £14,850 per term, or £44,550 per annum.

Based in an enclosed setting of 800 acres outside Oxford, Radley College's facilities include a golf course (and simulator), an indoor rowing tank, design engineering workshops, an art gallery, the Countryside Centre, the Radley Zoo and an Observatory. A new Music School will open in 2026.

Radley College was named Best Public School in the 2024 Tatler School Awards.

In May 2025, Radley College announced one of the largest mergers in the independent charitable schools industry with Prep Schools Trust (PST). The merger formally took effect in September 2025, and saw funds, staff and ownership of the prep schools within PST transfer to the Charity of St Peter's College, Radley.

== History ==
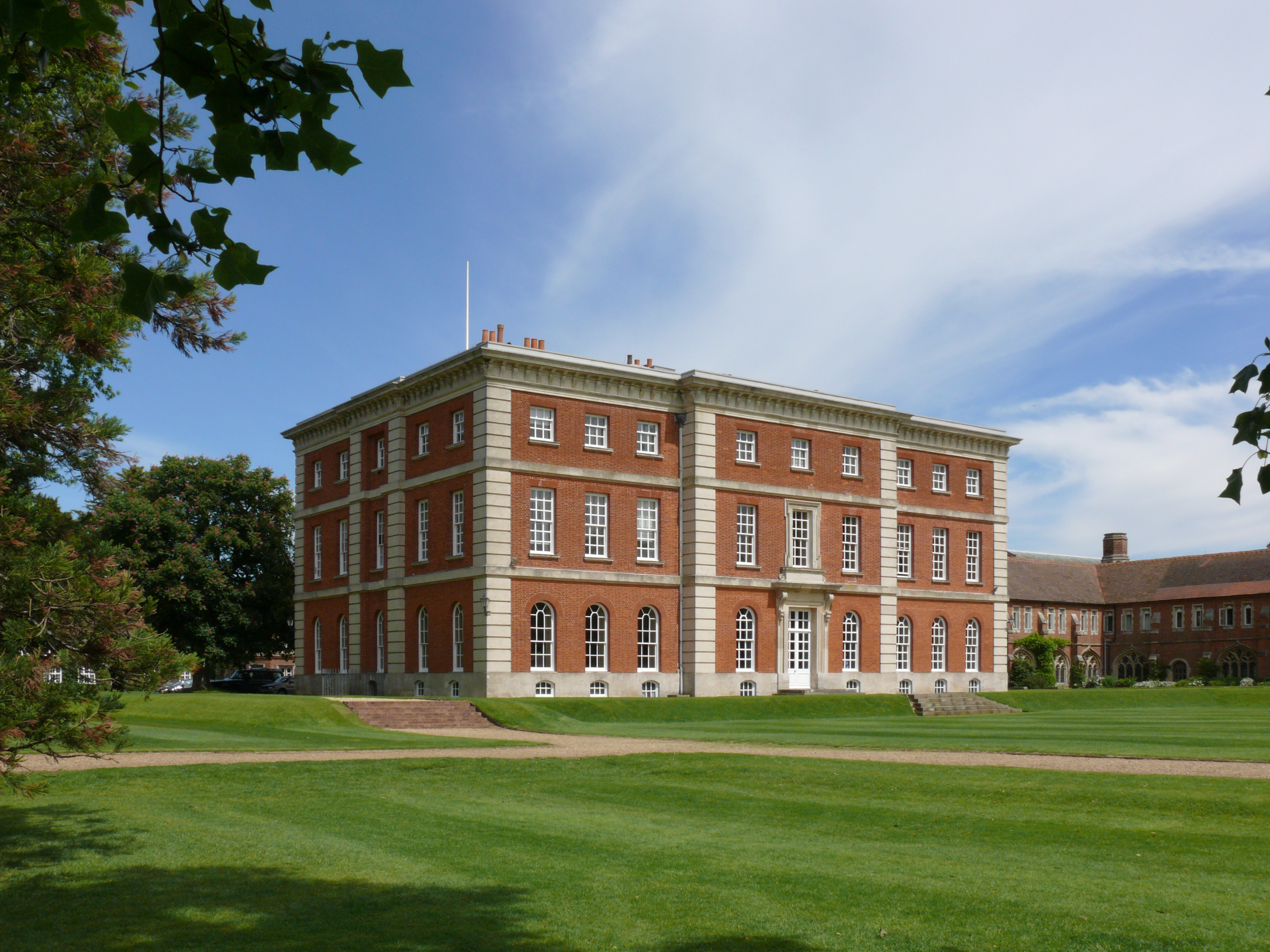
South front of Radley Hall – the "Mansion" – with part of the school's main corridor to the right

Radley was founded in 1847 by William Sewell (1804–79) and Robert Corbet Singleton (1810–81). The first pupil was Samuel Reynolds, who in 1897 wrote his reminiscences of school life.

The school was originally housed in Radley Hall, now known as "Mansion". Radley Hall was built in the 1720s for the Stonehouse family. Later in the 18th century the estate passed to the Bowyer family, who commissioned Capability Brown to re-design the grounds. After the school was founded, extensive building work took place, beginning with the Chapel (replaced by the current building in 1895), F Social and Octagon (the earliest living accommodation for the boys), Clock Tower, and in 1910 the dining hall (Hall). Building work has continued throughout the 20th and 21st centuries, with three new Socials, a weights-room/gym, a rowing tank, a theatre, and a real tennis court being completed since 2006. The Science Block was also expanded and refurbished in 2019. The grounds include a lake, a golf course and woodland.

On 31 August 2017, The Daily Telegraph reported that a whistleblower had suggested that teachers had helped their students in an art GCSE exam. Investigations by the exam board found no fault beyond a minor technical breach of exam regulations. Radley College issued a statement expressing full support for staff and procedures both within the art department and across the school.

On 6 July 2018, pupils hired a plane to tow a banner reading "Make Radley Great Again" over the school, reportedly in response to changes to the school branding and staff during John Moule's time as warden.

== School terms ==
There are three academic terms in the year:

- The Michaelmas term, from early September to mid-December.
- The Lent term, from early January to late March.
- The Summer term, from mid-April to late June or early July.

== Radley formalities ==
Radley College has its own specialised terminology and formalities, similar to the notions of Winchester College. For example, all teachers are referred to as "dons", and female teachers and members of staff are addressed only as "ma'am"; the headmaster is known as the "warden"; boarding houses are known as "socials", with their masters being known as "tutors" and their head prefects as "pups"; ties earned by pups, top sportsmen, and other distinguished boys have flat bottoms and are known as "strings" ("social strings" if earned for distinction within the social, "college strings" if earned for distinction within the wider college); and the five year-groups, from first to last, are called "shell", "remove", "fifth", "6.1", and "6.2". During the Michaelmas and Lent terms, gowns are worn over uniforms, while during the summer term, shirts are worn without ties, jackets, or gowns (known as "Summer Dress" or, more officially, as "Shirt-Sleeve Order"). A formal house meeting is held once a week, known as "social prayers" (an assembly usually with a talk or presentation); an informal house meeting with food, known as "cocoa", takes place every evening; a weekend which a boy would usually stay in school for but has been allowed to leave on is known as a "privi" (short for "privilege weekend" as these can be cancelled if a boy is subject to disciplinary proceedings); and the final day of the academic year is known as "gaudy", from the Latin gaudē meaning "rejoice thou".

== Socials ==
There are 11 socials at Radley, each housing approximately 70 boys and distinguished by the colours of their members' ties. They are each known by a single letter, although they are formally named after their tutor (e.g., H, formally Wood's Social). When the college opened, most boys were living together in College, but they were under the care of six "social tutors" and the term "social" then referred to all the boys under the care of one tutor. When D Social was built in 1886, all the boys and their tutor were united in their own living quarters and so the word "social" came to mean the building and all of its inhabitants. Similar to Eton's houses and their dames, each social at Radley has a matron known as the "PHM" ("pastoral housemistress"), whose role is central.

| Name | Colours | Tutor |
|---|---|---|
| A | Blue and brown | Richard Hughes |
| B | Purple and black | Charlie Scott-Malden |
| C | Pale blue and dark blue | Alexander Nash |
| D | Blue and white | Charlie McKegney |
| E | Pink and black | Adam Jolly |
| F | Maroon and gold | Tom Norton |
| G | Red and dark blue | Graham King |
| H | Dark green and light yellow | Nick Wood |
| J | Light blue and coral | Kyle Willis-Stovold |
| K | Green and white | Fergus Taylor |
| L | Yellow and navy blue | Simon Dalrymple |

== Academic aspects ==
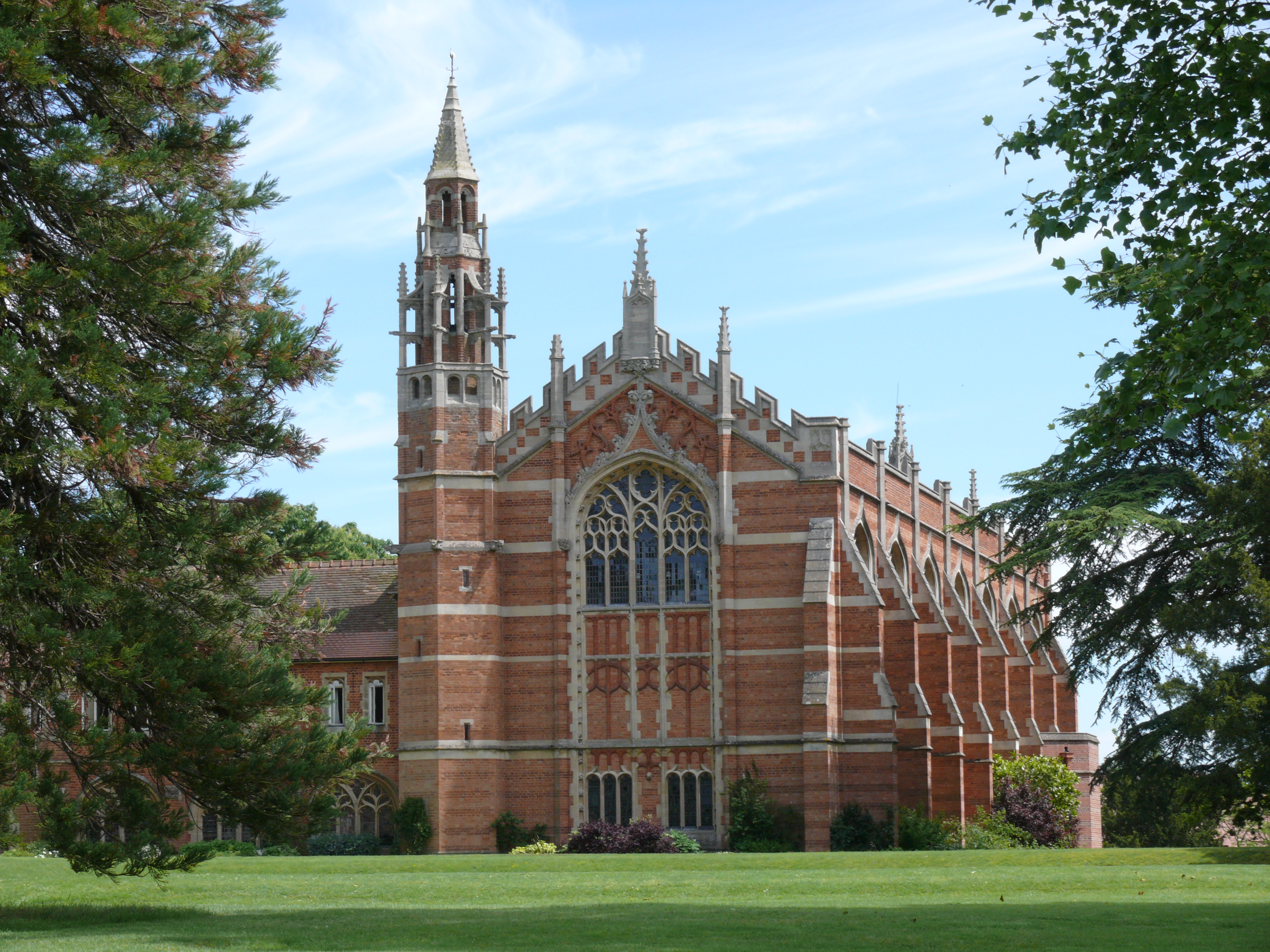
West front and spire of the Chapel

The school was inspected by the independent schools' Inspectorate in February 2008. The inspection report rated the school's standard of education as "outstanding", the highest rating. There was a subsequent inspection by ISI in 2013, and a further inspection in 2023.

In 2012, the Independent review of A level results, based on government issued statistics, ranked Radley 31st in the UK, ahead of Malvern (32nd), Harrow (34th), Winchester (73rd), Tonbridge (74th), Eton (80th) and Wellington (89th) By 2019 they were still in the top 100 but had dropped to 75th place.

== Sports ==
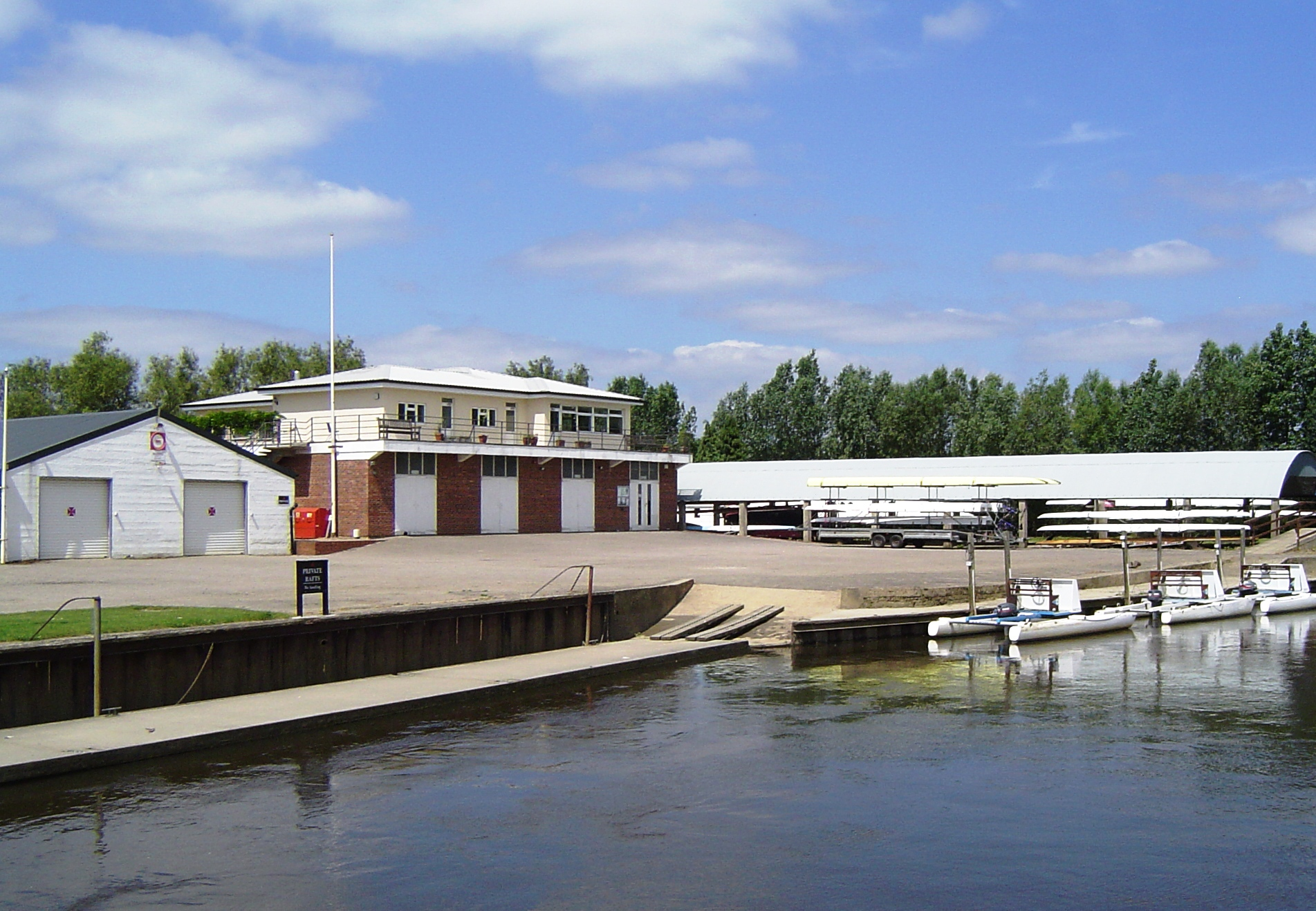
College Boat House on the Thames

Sports played at the College are rugby football in the Michaelmas Term, hockey, rowing and football in the Lent Term and cricket, rowing, lawn tennis, and athletics in the Summer Term.

Other sports played include badminton, basketball, beagling, cross-country, fencing, fives, lacrosse, rackets, real tennis, rugby sevens, squash, water polo, swimming and sailing.

=== Rugby ===
Rugby is the major sport of the Michaelmas term. The school fields 23 rugby teams on most Saturdays of the Michaelmas term and on some Thursdays. The Master in charge of Rugby is former Gloucester loose-head prop Nick Wood, OR.

=== Rowing ===
Radley is recognised for its rowing, having won events at Henley Royal Regatta on 6 occasions. Only Eton, St Paul's, Shrewsbury, and St Edward's have won more events at the Regatta.

=== Cricket ===
Cricket is played in the summer term. Some Old Radleians have progressed to play cricket for England or captain county level cricket teams.

=== Field hockey ===
Eighteen hockey teams are fielded during the Lent term. Teams train on three Astroturf pitches and a full-sized indoor hockey pitch. Radley takes part in the Independent Schools Hockey League.

=== Football ===
Twelve football teams are fielded in the Lent term. Radley competes in ISFA Southern Independent Schools Lent Term League. There is a yearly pre-season training camp before term starts.

=== Other sports ===
Sports such as fives, rackets, sailing, badminton, and polo are represented, as well as scuba diving. A real tennis court opened in July 2008, which made Radley the only school in the world to have fives, squash, badminton, tennis, racquets, and real tennis courts all on campus.

== Southern Railway Schools Class ==
The school lent its name to a steam locomotive (Engine 930; Radley) of Southern Railway's Class V (Schools), which were named for English public schools.

== Price-fixing cartel case (2005) ==
In 2005 Radley College was one of fifty of the country's leading independent schools which were found guilty by the Office of Fair Trading of running an illegal price-fixing cartel which had allowed them to drive up fees. Each school was required to pay a nominal penalty of £21,360 and all agreed to make ex-gratia payments totalling three million pounds into a Trust designed to benefit pupils who attended the schools during the period in respect of which fee information was shared. In their defence, Jean Scott, the head of the Independent Schools Council, said that independent schools had previously been exempt from the anti-cartel rules applied to business; they were following a long-established procedure in sharing the information with one another and they were unaware of the current law.

== List of Wardens ==
- R C Singleton (founder) (1847–1851)
- W B Heathcote (1851–1852)
- W M Sewell (founder) (1852–1861)
- R W Norman (1861–1866)
- W Wood (1866–1870)
- C Martin (1871–1879)
- R J Wilson (1880–1888)
- H Lewis Thompson (1888–1896)
- T Field (1897–1913)
- E Gordon Selwyn (1913–1919)
- A Fox (1919–1925)
- W H Ferguson (1925–1937)
- J C Vaughan Wilkes (1937–1954)
- W M M Milligan (1954–1968)
- D R W Silk (1968–1991)
- R M Morgan (1991–2000)
- A W McPhail (2000–2014)
- J S Moule (2014–Present)

== Notable alumni ==
- Boyd Alexander, traveller and ornithologist
- James Bachman, comic writer and actor
- Merton Barker, cricketer and field hockey player
- Richard Beard, prize-winning author of fiction and non-fiction
- Harry Bicket, conductor
- George Boughey, racehorse trainer
- C. E. Bowden, pilot and pioneer of IC engined model flight and radio control
- Gerald Brenan, writer
- John Bridcut, documentary film maker
- Christopher Bulstrode, orthopedic surgeon and author
- William Burdett-Coutts, producer, Assembly Festival
- James Burton, conductor and composer
- Richard Toby Coke, UKIP politician
- William Collins, author and cricketer
- Peter Cook, comedian
- John Crabtree, lawyer and businessman; Lord Lieutenant of the West Midlands
- Tim Crooks, Olympic rower
- Jamie Dalrymple, cricketer
- Norman Denny, author, translator of Victor Hugo's Les Misérables
- Ted Dexter, cricketer
- Artemas Diamandis, musician
- Alexander Downer, former Australian Foreign Minister and former Australian High Commissioner to the Court of St James
- Mark Durden-Smith, television presenter
- Ivan Ewart, British naval officer and charity worker
- Jeremy Flint, bridge player
- George Freeman, Conservative Member of Parliament for Mid Norfolk
- David Freeman-Mitford, 2nd Baron Redesdale, father of the Mitford sisters
- Andrew Gant, choirmaster and composer
- Richard Gibson, actor, best known as Herr Flick in the BBC series 'Allo 'Allo!
- Nicholas Hannen, actor
- Robert Hall, BBC special correspondent
- Noel Harrison, English actor & member of the British Olympic skiing team in the 1950s
- Simon Hart, Conservative Member of Parliament for Carmarthen West and South Pembrokeshire.
- Alex Hearne, cricketer
- Christopher Hibbert, historian
- Cyril Holland, son of Oscar Wilde
- Sir George Hollingbery, former Conservative Member of Parliament for Meon Valley and former Ambassador to the Republic of Cuba
- Charles Howard, 20th Earl of Suffolk, pioneering bomb disposal expert in the Second World War
- Alan Huggins, Hong Kong judge
- Charles Hulse, cricketer
- Ben Hutton, cricketer
- Sir Nicholas Jackson, organist and composer
- Jamie Laing, Reality TV in Made in Chelsea
- Thomas Langford-Sainsbury, air vice marshal
- Hugh Lindley-Jones, cricketer
- Desmond Llewelyn, actor best known for playing Q in many James Bond films
- Archie Lorne, heir-apparent to the Dukedom of Argyll
- James Lovegrove, SF novelist
- Rupert Lowe, Member of Parliament for Great Yarmouth
- Dick Lucas, evangelical Anglican preacher
- Sir Edgar Ludlow-Hewitt, air chief marshal
- James Charles Macnab of Macnab, soldier and chief of Clan Macnab
- Sir George Mallaby, public servant, High Commissioner to New Zealand
- Robert Marshall, cricketer
- Robin Martin-Jenkins, cricketer
- Sir Charlie Mayfield, CEO of Waitrose and John Lewis Partnership
- J.X. Merriman, South African statesman
- Harold Monro, founder of the Poetry Bookshop
- Lord Charles Montagu Douglas Scott, admiral
- Andrew Motion, poet and former Poet Laureate
- Andrew Nairne, director of Kettle's Yard
- Sandy Nairne, director of the National Portrait Gallery
- Sir Christopher Nugee, Lord Justice of the Court of Appeal (England and Wales)
- Edward Nugee, Barrister, Treasurer of the Inner Temple
- Lt Gen Richard Nugee, British Army officer
- Owen Paterson, MP and former cabinet minister
- Ian Payne, broadcaster
- James Pearce, journalist and presenter for BBC Sport
- Sir David Pountney, opera director
- Edgar Prestage, historian and Portuguese scholar
- Dennis Price, actor
- Sir Nicholas Redmayne (1938–2008), stockbroker and investment banker
- Michael Reeves, film director
- S.H. Reynolds, clergyman
- Professor Sir Mike Richards, UK National Cancer Director
- Lord Scarman, judge
- Brough Scott, horse racing journalist, radio and television presenter, and former jockey
- James Scott, cricketer
- Tom Shakespeare, sociologist and broadcaster
- Thomas Spyers, cricketer
- Clive Stafford Smith, campaigning lawyer
- Andrew Strauss, cricketer
- Will Stuart, rugby player
- Jeremy Stuart-Smith, High Court judge
- Sir Reginald Stubbs, colonial governor
- Richard Tanner, organist
- Lieutenant Colonel Rupert Thorneloe, killed in action in Afghanistan on 1 July 2009
- Collingwood Tinling, builder of first jet engine
- Henry Tufnell, politician
- Nigel Twiston-Davies, Cheltenham Gold Cup winning horse trainer
- Charlie Wallis, cricketer
- James, Earl of Wessex, nephew of Charles III
- Mike Westmacott, mountaineer, Member of the successful 1953 British Mount Everest Expedition
- Peter Wildeblood, journalist and playwright and celebrated gay rights campaigner
- Richard Wilson, Baron Wilson of Dinton, former UK Cabinet Secretary
- Simon Wolfson, Baron Wolfson of Aspley Guise, CEO of Next plc
- Major General Sir Edward Woodgate, who died of wounds sustained during the Battle of Spion Kop
- Charles Worsley, cricketer
