= Richard Berens =

Richard Berens may refer to:

- Richard Berens (cricketer, born 1801) (1801–1859), English amateur cricketer
- Richard Berens (cricketer, born 1864) (1864–1909), English cricketer and barrister
