= Lord Hawke's cricket team in North America in 1894 =

An English cricket team led by Lord Hawke toured North America in September and October 1894 and two of its matches are considered to have been first-class. This was the second tour to North America led by Hawke: he had previously led a side there in 1891–92 and three of the players from the earlier tour, not including Hawke, were also on this second one.

The team played six matches in all, five of them in the United States and one in Canada. The games against the Gentlemen of Philadelphia were of three days' duration, though the second was finished inside two days, and are considered first-class. Other games in New York, Toronto and Lowell, Massachusetts, were each scheduled for two days and are not considered first-class; the match in Lowell was finished inside a single day and an exhibition game, also not first-class, was played on the second day without a result.

== The team ==
Hillyard, McAlpine and Wright had been part of Lord Hawke's previous team to North America in 1891–92.

| Name | County | Birth date | Batting Style | Bowling Style | Refs |
|---|---|---|---|---|---|
| Lord Hawke (Captain) | Yorkshire | 16 August 1860 (aged 34) | Right-handed | – | |
| Gerald Bardswell | Lancashire | 7 December 1873 (aged 20) | Right-handed | Right-arm medium pace | |
| Lawrence Bathurst | Middlesex | 4 June 1871 (aged 23) | Right-handed | Left-arm medium pace | |
| Charles de Trafford | Leicestershire | 21 May 1864 (aged 30) | Right-handed | – | |
| Ledger Hill | Hampshire | 26 July 1871 (aged 23) | Right-handed | Right-arm underarm | |
| George Hillyard | Leicestershire | 6 February 1864 (aged 30) | Right-handed | Right arm fast-medium | |
| Robert Lucas | Middlesex | 17 July 1867 (aged 27) | Right-handed | Right-arm medium pace | |
| Kenneth McAlpine | Kent | 11 April 1858 (aged 36) | Right-handed | – | |
| Gerald Mordaunt | Kent | 20 January 1873 (aged 21) | Right-handed | Right arm underarm slow | |
| Sandford Robinson | Nottinghamshire | 5 February 1868 (aged 26) | Right-handed | (Wicketkeeper) | |
| William Whitwell | – | 12 December 1867 (aged 26) | Right-handed | Right arm fast | |
| Charles Wright | Nottinghamshire | 27 May 1863 (aged 31) | Right-handed | (Wicketkeeper) | |

== The tour ==
Hawke's team left London on 8 September 1894, sailing from Southampton that day. At the time of the departure, the team was expected to be playing matches in "New York, Philadelphia, Baltimore and Boston" and to be returning home by 1 October. The tour was in fact extended by a couple of weeks with a visit to Canada, but a report in England indicates that it was not entirely a success: "The English cricketers in America are losing their power to attract, there is a decrease in the number of spectators at their matches with their Yankee opponents, their doings appear to excite less interest, and their victories are not so much taken to heart as they used to be," said a note in the Cheltenham Chronicle newspaper. "Cricket is losing its hold upon the American public, who having gone wild over the short and exciting game of baseball, are losing all taste for our prosaic natural [sic] pastime."

Not all the team came back together: newspapers record the arrival of eight members of the team in Southampton on 17 October 1894.

== First-class matches ==
Two first-class matches were played on the tour, both of them against the Gentlemen of Philadelphia side. McAlpine was omitted from the team for both of these matches.

21–24 September 1894
CricketArchive

| Lord Hawke's XI | v | Gentlemen of Philadelphia |
| 187 (63.2 overs); Lord Hawke 78; Henry Baily 7/65 (23.2 overs) | | 169 (75.2 overs); Francis Bohlen 79; William Whitwell 4/14 (13 overs) |
| 235 (80.2 overs); Gerald Mordaunt 62; Henry Baily 3/62 (22 overs) | | 122 (56.1 overs); George Patterson 37; Lawrence Bathurst 8/44 (27 overs) |

Lord Hawke's XI won by 131 runs
Merion Cricket Club Ground, Haverford, Pennsylvania

- Lord Hawke's XI won the toss and chose to bat

28–29 September 1894
CricketArchive

| Lord Hawke's XI | v | Gentlemen of Philadelphia |
| 211 (107.1 overs); Robert Lucas 46; Walter Clark 3/20 (12 overs) | | 107 (58.3 overs); Clark 24; William Whitwell 4/33 (21 overs) |
| | | 64 (33.1 overs); Clark 18; Whitwell 5/25 (16.1 overs) |

Lord Hawke's XI won by an innings and 40 runs
Germantown Cricket Club Ground, Philadelphia

- Lord Hawke's XI won the toss and chose to bat
- The game was scheduled for three days but completed in two

== Other games ==
There were three other matches, each of two days' duration, scheduled on the tour, none of them first-class. The team began with a 12-a-side match against an "All New York" team at the Staten Island Cricket Club ground: Hawke's side batted for the whole of the first day and the second was lost entirely to rain. The first-class matches in Philadelphia came next, after which the side headed for Toronto and a two-day game against a "Gentlemen of Canada" side which was drawn. In what was intended to be the final game of the tour, the team played a Massachusetts side, with Hawke's team 12-strong and the Americans 15; the numbers did not help and the touring team triumphed by an innings inside a single day. A "fill-up" single innings match was arranged for the vacant second day, but this match appears not to have been completed, and the scorecard does not give full detail of the home side.
