= Legh Barratt =

English cricketer

- Born: 11 December 1871
- Died: 14 December 1950 (aged 79)
- Occupation: cricketer

Legh Barratt, erroneously recorded at times as Leigh Barratt (11 December 1871 – 14 December 1950) was an English cricketer from Altrincham in Cheshire, England.

Barratt played between 1894 and 1897, largely for Norfolk, though he also took part in two tours of the West Indies: Robert Slade Lucas' 1894–95 tour and Arthur Priestley's 1896–97 tour. He played all 15 of his first-class matches on these two tours, scoring 253 runs at an average of 11.00 and taking nine wickets at an average of 34.88.

He married Mary Thorburn in Cromer, Norfolk, in 1899. He died in Sheringham, Norfolk. He had two brothers, Gordon and William Barratt, who also played for Norfolk.
