= Kenneth McAlpine (cricketer) =

English cricketer, local government representative, and wine merchant

Kenneth McAlpine (11 April 1858 – 10 February 1923) was an English local government representative, a wine merchant and a cricketer who played first-class cricket for Kent and for teams led by Lord Hawke in North America. He was born at Leamington Spa, Warwickshire, and died at Loose, Maidstone, Kent.

Educated at Haileybury College, McAlpine left school early and was articled to a brewery in Maidstone, but left to become a tea-planter in India. Returning to England, he bought a wine merchant's business and also became a director of a different Maidstone brewery; he also involved himself in local politics as a councillor on Kent County Council and was chairman of the local Unionist Association in Maidstone.

McAlpine's cricket career was brief, but he had a long and enduring influence on the game in Kent as an administrator and a talent-spotter. He played three matches as a right-handed batsman for Kent in 1885 and 1886, but his highest score was only 10. He also went to North America on cricket tours organised and led by his friend Lord Hawke in 1891–92 and 1894; on both tours, first-class matches were played, but McAlpine appeared in just one of them, on the 1891-92 tour. McAlpine was for many years the secretary of the Mote Cricket Club in Maidstone where he also played, and his talent in spotting potential cricketers led to him being brought on to Kent County Cricket Club committees; he was serving as president of the county club in the year of his death.

He did not marry.

== Bibliography ==
- Carlaw, Derek (2020). Kent County Cricketers, A to Z: Part One (1806–1914) (PDF). Cardiff: ACS.
