= Christopher Heseltine =

English cricketer (1869–1944)

Personal information
- Born: 26 November 1869; South Kensington, Middlesex, England
- Died: 13 June 1944 (aged 74); Walhampton, Hampshire, England
- Batting: Right-handed
- Bowling: Right-arm fast

International information
- National side: England (1896)
- Test debut (cap 102): 2 March 1896 v South Africa
- Last Test: 21 March 1896 v South Africa

Domestic team information
- Years: Team
- 1892–1914: Marylebone Cricket Club
- 1895–1904: Hampshire

Career statistics
Competition	Test	First-class
Matches	2	79
Runs scored	18	1,390
Batting average	9.00	12.30
100s/50s	0/0	0/3
Top score	18	77
Balls bowled	157	8,216
Wickets	5	170
Bowling average	16.80	24.50
5 wickets in innings	1	7
10 wickets in match	0	0
Best bowling	5/38	7/106
Catches/stumpings	3/–	54/–
- Source: Cricinfo, 20 July 2021

Christopher Heseltine OBE DL JP (26 November 1869 – 13 June 1944) was an English Test cricketer, cricket administrator, and British Army officer. Heseltine made his debut in first-class cricket for the Marylebone Cricket Club (MCC) in 1892, a club he would go on to have a long association with in both a playing and administrative capacity. He played his county cricket for Hampshire County Cricket Club between 1895 and 1914, developing late as a successful fast bowler in first-class cricket. A close acquaintance of Lord Hawke, he accompanied him on three tours abroad, including to South Africa in 1895–96, making two Test match appearances for England against South Africa, in which he took a five wicket haul on debut. During his first-class career he played in 79 matches and took 170 wickets. He was later a member of the MCC committee and had two spells as president of Hampshire.

Heseltine was an officer in the British Army, initially serving as a volunteer in the 5th (City of London) Battalion. With the beginning of the Second Boer War in 1899, he was commissioned into the regular army and went to South Africa with the Imperial Yeomanry; this essentially ended his first-class cricket career, with the exception of a few matches following the conflict. After serving as an extra aide de camp to the Lord Lieutenant of Ireland, Heseltine later served in the First World War at the War Office, during the course of which he was awarded the Legion of Honour and made an Officer of the Order of the British Empire. Following his military career, Heseltine served as both a deputy lieutenant and justice of the peace for Hampshire.

== Early life ==
The son of the painter and art collector John Postle Heseltine, he was born at South Kensington in November 1869. Heseltine was educated at Eton College, before matriculating to Trinity Hall, Cambridge. While studying at Cambridge, he played association football for Cambridge University against Oxford University in 1891, gaining a blue. At both Eton and Cambridge, he did not feature in the cricket elevens. In his final year at Cambridge in 1892, Heseltine made his debut in first-class cricket for the Marylebone Cricket Club (MCC) against Cambridge University at Fenner's.

== Cricket ==
Heseltine pictured, top-row, second from the right, in the team photo for Lord Hawke's touring XI to Ceylon and India in 1892–93

From November 1892 to February 1893, Heseltine toured Ceylon and India with Lord Hawke's XI, making four first-class appearances during the tour. These saw him play twice against the Parsees and once each against Bombay and All-India. He had success on the tour, taking 13 wickets on one occasion in a minor match against the Madras Natives. Following the end of the tour, Heseltine and Lord Hawke explored Nepal and intended to partake in some shooting. It would not be until May 1894 that his next appearances in first-class cricket came, with Heseltine making two appearances for the MCC against Derbyshire and Kent, following that up a year later by making five appearances for the MCC, in addition to making his debut for Hampshire in the 1895 County Championship against Somerset at Taunton, having played for the county since 1891, when they held second-class status.

Heseltine was once again selected to tour with Lord Hawke's XI on their tour of South Africa in 1895–96. For matches against South Africa, the team was designated as England. Heseltine played in two of the three matches against South Africa, which were later retrospectively granted Test status. In the Second Test at Cape Town, which was his Test debut, Heseltine took a five wicket haul in the South Africa second innings with figures of 5 for 38, having gone wicketless in their first innings. In doing so, he became the eighth bowler to take a five wicket haul on Test debut. He also made a first-class appearance on the tour against Western Province. A hiatus of nearly a year followed before his next appearances in first-class cricket, which came when he toured the West Indies from February to April 1897 with Lord Hawke's XI and made six first-class appearances. Heseltine was successful with the ball during the tour, taking 32 wickets at an average of 15.53. Prior to the West Indies tour, he had seldom bowled in first-class cricket and had been considered up to that point to "not quite good enough for county cricket".

Returning to England from the tour, Heseltine became a regular member of the Hampshire team. He featured for them fifteen times in 1897, in which he took 41 wickets at an average of 17.29, which included two five wicket hauls. He followed this up with thirteen appearances in 1898 and 25 wickets. However, his best season in terms of number of wickets taken was to be the last in which he regularly featured for Hampshire, with his fourteen appearances in 1899 bringing him 45 wickets, which included his career best figures of 7 for 106 against Derbyshire. He next played for Hampshire in the 1901 County Championship, taking his seventh and final five wicket haul during that season. Heseltine's appearances for Hampshire became less frequent thereafter, with three appearances in 1902 and one apiece in 1903 and 1904. After the turn of the century he appeared in three further first-class matches for the MCC, playing twice in 1902 and once in 1914 against Hampshire at Lord's, which came ten years after his last first-class match. Heseltine also made one appearance for I Zingari in first-class cricket, against the Gentlemen of England in 1904. Playing primarily as a bowler, he made 79 appearances in first-class cricket, taking 170 wickets at an average of 24.50. Wisden noted how by "fully utilising his height, he brought the ball over at the extreme extent of his arm with deadly effect at times", whilst commenting that at occasion "he was inconsistent and required careful nursing because apt to tire". Lord Hawke was of the opinion that he was considered a bowler who sacrificed length for pace. As a right-handed batsman, he scored 1,390 runs at an average of 12.30; he scored three half centuries, with a highest score of 77. Amongst his most notable feats in first-class cricket was to dismiss Bobby Abel for three successive ducks.

In addition to playing, Heseltine was also a prominent administrator. He had two spells as president of Hampshire County Cricket Club; he was first elected in 1925 and again in 1936, with his second spell lasting until his death in 1944. As Hampshire president during his second spell, it was Heseltine who recommended John Manners to Hampshire having watched him play at Lord's in a Royal Navy versus Army match, where he had been impressed by his batting. He was also associated with the MCC in an administrative capacity, serving for many years on the MCC committee. He sat on the MCC committee during the controversial bodyline tour of Australia during the 1932–33 Ashes, debating a response with other committee members to the escalating controversy unfolding in Australia.

== Military career ==
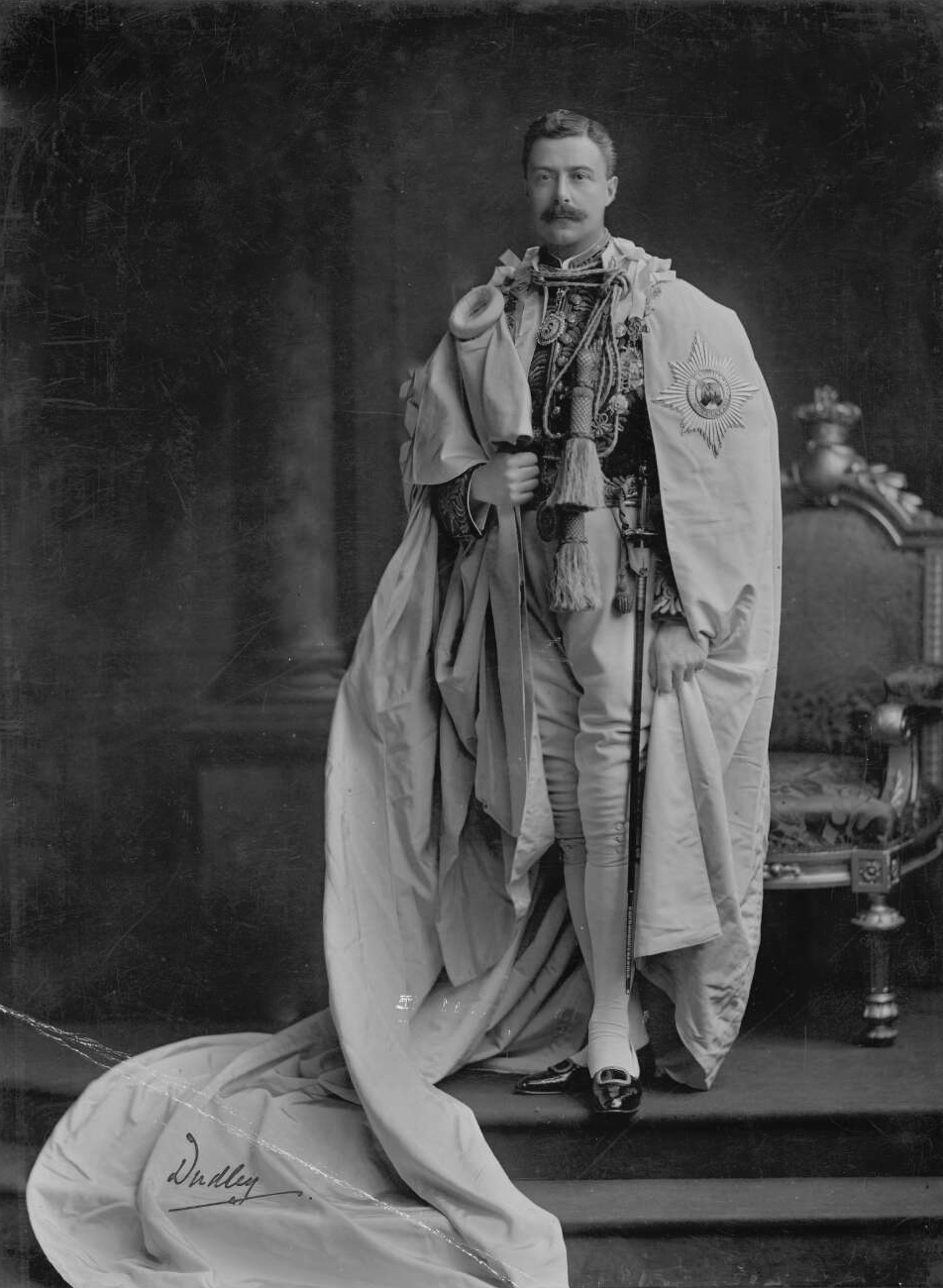
Heseltine was aide-de-camp to the Earl of Dudley (pictured) when he was Lord Lieutenant of Ireland

Heseltine's career military career began as a volunteer when he was still at Eton, with his appointment into the 5th (City of London) Battalion as a second lieutenant in February 1888. Promotion to lieutenant followed in December 1890, during his first year at Cambridge University. Following his graduation from Cambridge, he was promoted to captain in December 1892, with promotion to major following in September 1898. With the start of the Second Boer War in 1899, he joined the Imperial Yeomanry and gained a commission into the regular army as a lieutenant in February 1900, leaving that same month for service in South Africa. His participation in the war was noted as a reason for the weak Hampshire side of 1900, with several of their players serving in South Africa. After completing his service with the yeomanry, he returned to the City of London Regiment as a volunteer and resumed his rank of major.

Shortly thereafter, Heseltine served as an extra aide-de-camp to the Earl of Dudley, the Lord Lieutenant of Ireland between 1902 and 1906. He was promoted to lieutenant colonel in July 1903, before resigning his commission in August 1906. In 1911, whilst on the army Reserve of Officers list, he was promoted to captain. Heseltine was recalled during the First World War by the War Office, where he served as a messenger to George V, and was appointed in 1916 to the staff of the Egyptian Expeditionary Force. He was twice mentioned in dispatches during the war. For his service in the war, he was decorated by France with the Legion of Honour in November 1920, and was made an Officer of the Order of the British Empire. Following the end of the war, he relinquished his appointment to the staff and was granted permission to retain his honorary rank.

== Later life ==
Following his military service, Heseltine had no paid employment and lived his life in a manner befitting a gentleman at Walhampton in the New Forest. He was master of the New Forest Hounds, a post he was appointed to in 1899, but his service in the Second Boer War rendered his mastership a short one. He and his brother, Godfrey, bred and raised basset hounds, and founded the Masters of Basset Hounds Association. He was co-opted onto the committee of The Kennel Club in 1903. Heseltine was appointed a deputy lieutenant for Hampshire in January 1925, in addition to serving as a justice of the peace for the county. During the Second World War, he was a member of the Home Guard.

Heseltine spent his final years living at Walhampton Cottage in the grounds of the former family home, Walhampton Estate. He died there of natural causes in June 1944. He was survived by his wife, Ethel, whom he had married in 1923, and their son, also called Christopher, who played minor cricket matches for Hampshire during the Second World War.
