= All Saints' Church, Wighill =

Church in North Yorkshire, England

Coordinates: 53.9132°N 1.2804°W

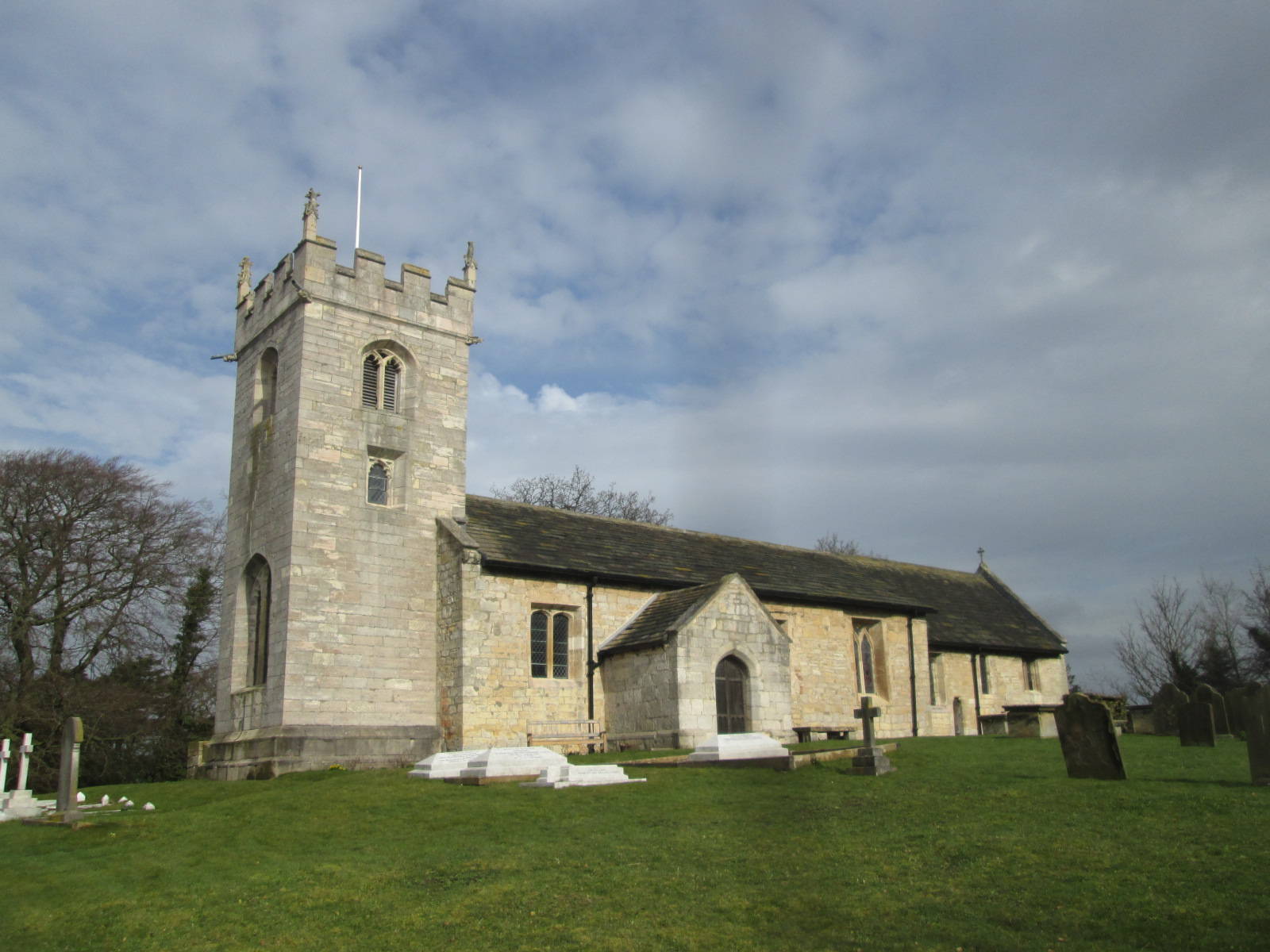
The church, in 2018

All Saints' Church is the parish church of Wighill, a village in North Yorkshire, in England.

The church was built in the 12th century, and a north aisle was added later in the century. In the 15th century, a tower was added, and the chancel was extended. The church was restored in 1912 by Walter Brierley, the work including the replacement of the chancel roof. The building was grade I listed in 1966.

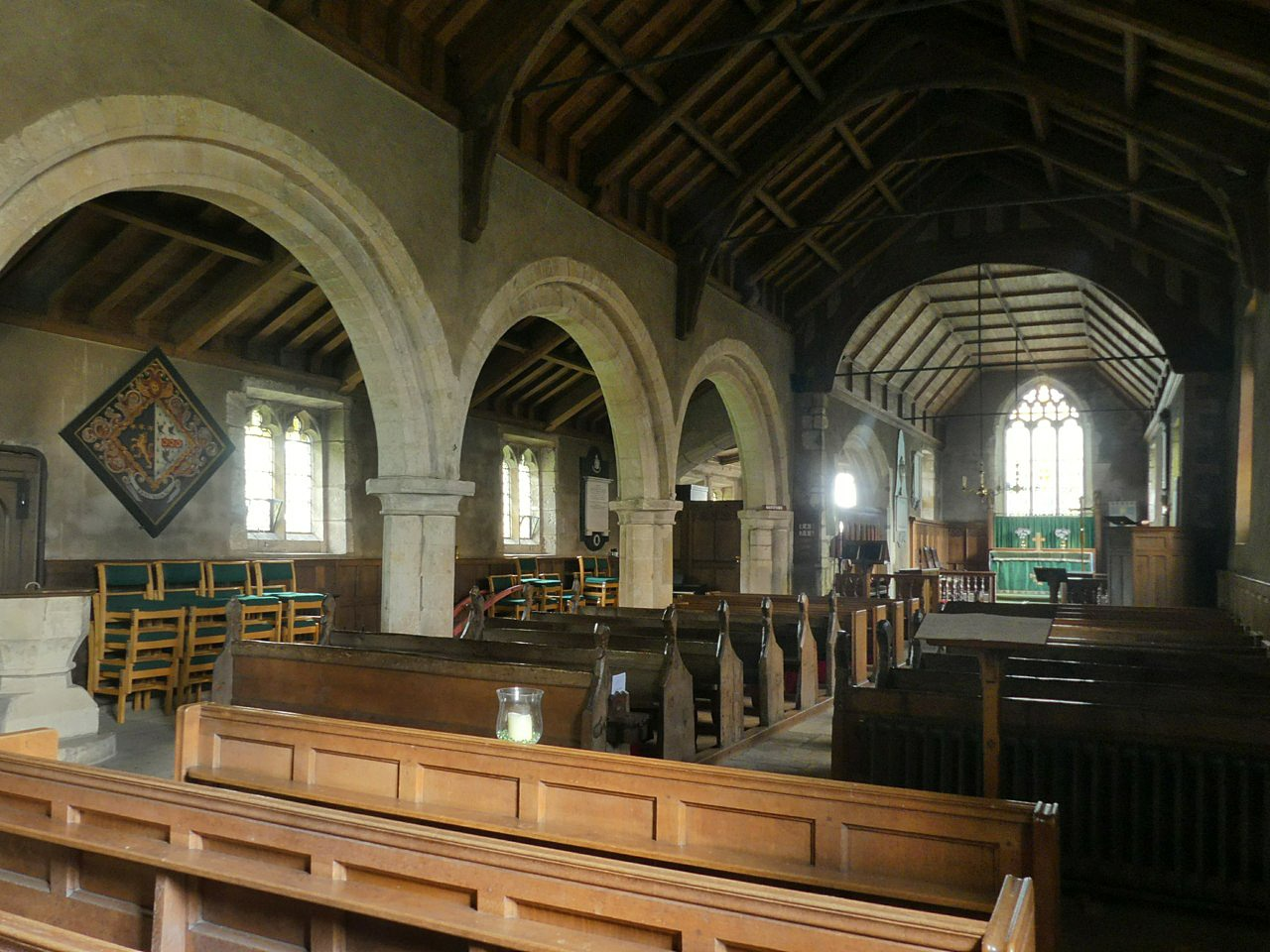
View from the nave into the chancel

The church is built of limestone with a stone slate roof, and consists of a nave, a south porch, a north aisle, a chancel and a west tower. The tower has three stages, a plinth, south and west windows, a north stair tower, two-light bell openings, and an embattled parapet with gargoyles and crocketed pinnacles. The Norman south doorway is highly decorated, with two orders of colonnettes, the capitals carved with biblical themes and foliage, and a round arch with four differently decorated orders. Inside, there is a piscina, an octagonal font, and remains of an aumbry. Six of the pews are probably 15th century, there is a 17th-century pulpit, and 17th-century balusters on the chancel screen and altar rail. There is also the marble chest tomb of Robert Stapylton, who died in 1634, and a fragment of a 10th-century cross.

== See also ==
- Grade I listed buildings in North Yorkshire (district)
- Listed buildings in Wighill
