= Hugh Bromley-Davenport =

English cricketer

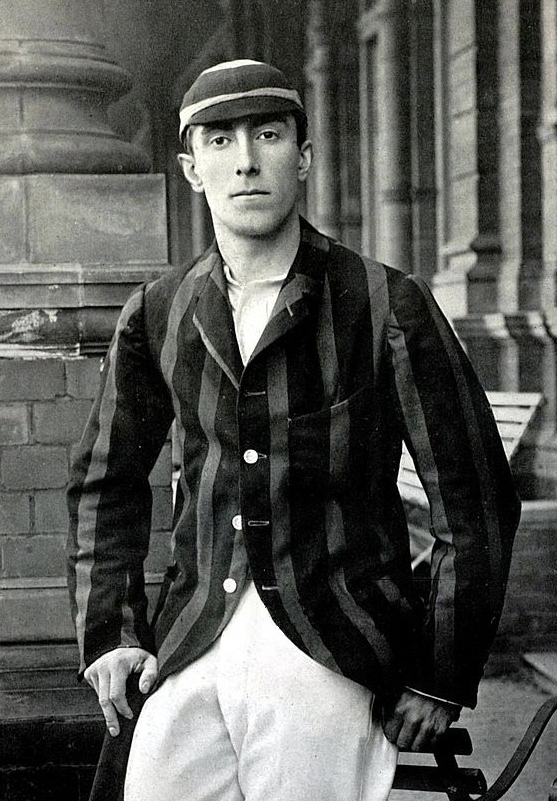

Personal information
- Full name: Hugh Richard Bromley-Davenport
- Born: 18 August 1870; Capesthorne Hall, Cheshire, England
- Died: 23 May 1954 (aged 83); South Kensington, London, England
- Batting: Right-handed
- Bowling: Left-arm fast

International information
- National side: England
- Test debut: 13 February 1896 v South Africa
- Last Test: 16 February 1899 v South Africa

Career statistics
Competition	Tests	First-class
Matches	4	76
Runs scored	128	1,801
Batting average	21.33	18.37
100s/50s	0/1	0/11
Top score	84	91
Balls bowled	155	6,910
Wickets	4	187
Bowling average	24.50	17.92
5 wickets in innings	0	12
10 wickets in match	0	1
Best bowling	2/46	7/17
Catches/stumpings	1/0	48/0
- Source: Cricinfo, 31 December 2020

Hugh Richard Bromley-Davenport OBE (18 August 1870 – 23 May 1954) was an English cricketer who played first-class cricket for Cambridge University between 1892 and 1893 and Middlesex between 1896 and 1898. He played four Test matches for England, all in South Africa.

== Life and career ==
Bromley-Davenport was educated at Eton and Trinity Hall, Cambridge. He took part in four overseas tours in the 1890s: to the West Indies with R. S. Lucas' XI in 1894–95 and Lord Hawke's XI in 1896–97, and to South Africa with the English Test team in 1895–96, when he played three Tests, and 1898–99, when he played one Test.

He was the most successful bowler on the tour of the West Indies in 1894–95, taking 56 wickets at 10.01, including his best first-class figures of 6 for 22 and 7 for 17 in the victory over Demerara. In the second innings he took the first first-class hat-trick in the West Indies. His best figures in England were 7 for 91 for A. J. Webbe's XI against Cambridge University in 1898. His best Test performance was with the bat, when he made a hard-hitting 84, adding 154 for the eighth wicket with Charles Wright, in the victory over South Africa in Johannesburg in March 1896.

He became a stockbroker in the City of London. He married Muriel Coomber in London in 1906; they had two children. He served as a lieutenant with the Royal Engineers in the First World War, and was awarded the OBE for his services.

Bromley-Davenport shares the record with Laxman Sivaramakrishnan for the longest surname among Test cricketers.
