= Wighill =

Village and civil parish in North Yorkshire, England

Coordinates: 53.91302°N 1.28124°W

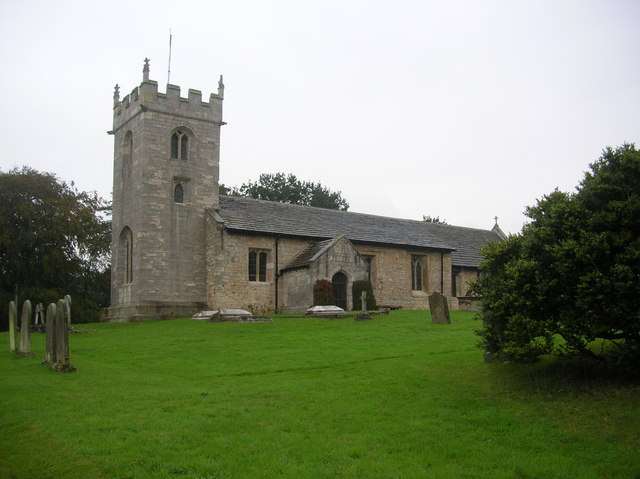
- All Saints' Parish Church in Wighill

- Location within North Yorkshire
- Population: 193 (2011 census)
- OS grid reference: SE473465
- Unitary authority: North Yorkshire
- Ceremonial county: North Yorkshire
- Region: Yorkshire and the Humber
- Country: England
- Sovereign state: United Kingdom
- Post town: TADCASTER
- Postcode district: LS24
- Police: North Yorkshire
- Fire: North Yorkshire
- Ambulance: Yorkshire
- UK Parliament: Wetherby and Easingwold

Wighill is a village and civil parish in the county of North Yorkshire, England. It is near the River Wharfe and 6 miles (9.7 km) east of Wetherby, West Yorkshire. The village has one public house, the White Swan Inn, which reopened in 2009 after a two-year closure.

Uhtred the Bold was murdered here in 1016.

== History ==
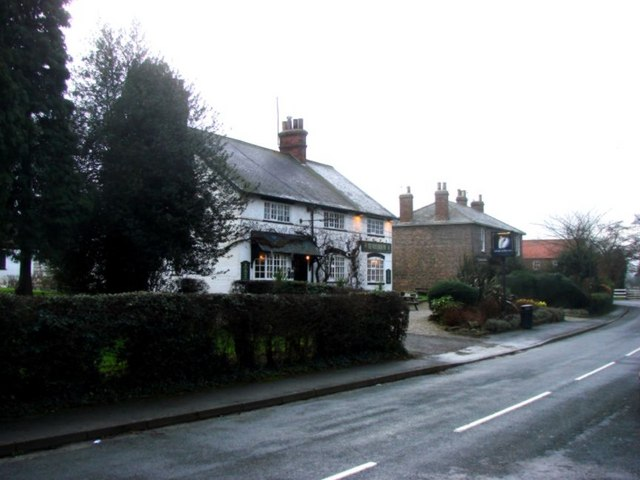
The White Swan, Wighill

In 1016, Uhtred was slain at a place called Wicheal by Cnut and a band of several men who had lain in wait for Uhtred. Several people have suggested that Wicheal is wighill. The village is mentioned in the Domesday Book as belonging to Geoffrey Alselin, and having 18 villagers and nine ploughlands. The name of the village is recorded as deriving from the Old English wic-halh, a nook of land with a dairy farm. The south end of the parish borders a meander of the River Wharfe. The old township was sometimes referred to as Wighill-cum-Esedyke, a reference to a place called Easdyke just west of the village, which had a drain into the river. One of the descendants of the Stapleton family recorded his belief that the name could be derived from Battle-hill, but that it was more likely to have meant a village set on a hill overlooking the windings [of the River Wharfe].

The village was historically in the wapentake of Ainsty, and formerly it was in the West Riding of Yorkshire. It was moved into North Yorkshire with the 1974 county boundary changes. From 1974 to 2023 it was part of the Borough of Harrogate, it is now administered by the unitary North Yorkshire Council.

Wighill Park, to the north-west of the village, was historically the county seat of the Stapleton family, but by the 19th century, it had been sold on.

All Saints' Church, Wighill, the Anglican place of worship in the village, is a grade I listed building which has 12th and 15th century origins. A vicarage and tithes were first recorded for Al Saints in the year 1288. The pub in the village was closed in 2007, and re-opened in 2009. It also serves as the local polling station on various voting days.

== Governance ==
The village is now in the Wetherby and Easingwold UK parliament constituency.

Population of Wighill 1801–2015
1801	1811	1821	1831	1841	1851	1861	1871	1881	1891	1901	1911	1921	1931	1951	1961	2001	2011	2015
216	214	250	276	237	296	280	241	239	137	215	194	170	180	229	220	193	193	190

== Notable people ==
- John Dawson (1871–1948), cricketer
- Thomas de Mowbray, 4th Earl of Norfolk, lord of Wighill in the late 14th century, beheaded in York in 1405
- Bryan Stapleton, a knight who bought the estate at Wighill in 1376
- Philip Stapleton (1603–1647), Member of Parliament during the English Civil War
- Rev. George Walker, 1618–1690, fought in the Battle of the Boyne in Ireland, and died on the battlefield.
- Lord Hawke (1860-1938), England cricketer, Wighill House & Park were the family seat

== See also ==
- Listed buildings in Wighill
