= Harry Smith-Turberville =

English cricketer

Personal information
- Full name: Harry Turberville Smith-Turberville
- Born: 18 January 1848; Westminster, London, England
- Died: 28 July 1934 (aged 86); Hove, Sussex, England
- Batting: Unknown
- Bowling: Unknown

Career statistics
| Competition | First-class |
|---|---|
| Matches | 2 |
| Runs scored | 31 |
| Batting average | 10.33 |
| 100s/50s | –/– |
| Top score | 14 |
| Balls bowled | 40 |
| Wickets | 1 |
| Bowling average | 28.00 |
| 5 wickets in innings | – |
| 10 wickets in match | – |
| Best bowling | 1/28 |
| Catches/stumpings | –/– |
- Source: Cricinfo, 31 July 2019

Harry Turberville Smith-Turberville (18 January 1848 – 28 July 1934) was an English first-class cricketer.

Smith-Turberville was born Harry Turberville Smith at Westminster in January 1848. He changed his name in November 1884.

He made his debut in first-class cricket for the Marylebone Cricket Club (MCC) against Derbyshire at Lord's in 1886. Batting twice in the match, Smith-Turberville was dismissed for 10 runs in the MCC first-innings by William Cropper, while in their second-innings he was dismissed by George Walker. He toured the West Indies with R. S. Lucas' XI in 1894–95, featuring in a single first-class match on the tour against Trinidad at Port of Spain. Again batting twice in the match, he was dismissed for 11 runs in the R. S. Lucas' XI first-innings by Float Woods, while ending their second-innings not out on 6. He also took a single wicket in Trinidad's second-innings, dismissing Lebrun Constantine to finish with figures of 1 for 28 from eight overs.

He married Emma "Queenie" Nevill in London in January 1885. He wrote a 68-page cricketing memoir, Peeps into the Past, in 1917. He died at Hove in July 1934.
