= John Dawson (cricketer, born 1871) =

English cricketer

Personal information
- Full name: John Miles Dawson
- Born: 3 November 1871; Wighill, Yorkshire, England
- Died: 3 December 1948 (aged 77); Harrogate, Yorkshire, England
- Batting: Unknown

Career statistics
Competition	First-class
Matches	8
Runs scored	196
Batting average	17.81
100s/50s	1/–
Top score	138
Catches/stumpings	9/–
- Source: Cricinfo, 29 July 2019

John Miles Dawson JP (3 November 1871 – 3 December 1948) was an English first-class cricketer.

The son of John Miles of Tadcaster, he was born at Wighill in November 1871. He was educated at Eton College, before going up to Trinity College, Cambridge. He toured the West Indies with R. S. Lucas' XI in 1894–95, making his debut in first-class cricket on the tour against Barbados at Bridgetown. He made four further first-class appearances on the tour, scoring 184 runs at an average of 26.28. His highest score on the tour came on debut against Barbados, when he made 138. Two years later he again toured the West Indies, this time with Lord Hawke's XI, with Dawson making three first-class appearances on the tour. He was less prolific with the bat during the tour, scoring just 12 runs.

In April 1896, he was commissioned as a second lieutenant in the West Yorkshire Regiment, with promotion to the rank of lieutenant in November 1896. He was promoted to the rank of captain January 1899, before resigning his commission in April 1900. He later served with the West Yorkshire Regiment in the First World War, during which he was seconded to the Labour Corps in April 1917. He served as a county alderman for the West Riding of Yorkshire, in addition to being a justice of the peace. He died at Harrogate in December 1948.
