= Listed buildings in Wighill =

Wighill is a civil parish in the county of North Yorkshire, England. It contains six listed buildings that are recorded in the National Heritage List for England. Of these, one is listed at Grade I, the highest of the three grades, and the others are at Grade II, the lowest grade. The parish contains the village of Wighill and the surrounding area. All the listed buildings are in the village, and consist of a church, two tombs in the churchyard, and three houses.

== Key ==
Grade	Criteria
I	Buildings of exceptional interest, sometimes considered to be internationally important
II	Buildings of national importance and special interest

== Buildings ==
Name and location	Photograph	Date	Notes	Grade
All Saints' Church; 53.91320°N 1.28054°W		12th century	The church has been extended and altered through the centuries, including a restoration in 1912–13 by Walter Brierley. It is built in limestone with a stone slate roof, and consists of a nave, a south porch, a north aisle, a chancel and a west tower. The tower has three stages, a plinth, south and west windows, a north stair tower, two-light bell openings, and an embattled parapet with gargoyles and crocketed pinnacles. The Norman south doorway is highly decorated, with two orders of colonnettes, the capitals carved with biblical themes and foliage, and a round arch with four differently decorated orders.	I
Table tomb 3 metres south of All Saints' Church; 53.91310°N 1.28059°W	—	1721	The tomb is in gritstone, and consists of a slab with chamfered edges on solid side and edge slabs. On it is a deeply cut inscription.	II
Table tomb one metre south of All Saints' Church; 53.91315°N 1.28057°W	—	Early to mid-18th century	The tomb is in gritstone, and consists of a large slab on four cubiform blocks with fielded outer panels. On it is a weathered inscription.	II
Wighill Manor Farmhouse; 53.91729°N 1.27840°W		c. 1791	The house is in limestone, with a stone slate roof, two storeys and three bays. In the centre is a doorway in a 16th-century surround, with fluted Corinthian columns, and an entablature with imposts and a cornice; the door has a Tudor arch, an architrave and a cornice. Above is a plaque with armorial bearings and two shields in cartouches. The windows are sashes with flat arches and splayed voussoirs.	II
School House; 53.91670°N 1.27831°W		Early 19th century	The house is in red-brown brick, with an eaves band and a hipped stone slate roof. There are two storeys and three bays. On the front are sash windows in flush architraves with segmental brick arches.	II
Brook Hall; 53.91364°N 1.28003°W	—	c. 1835	The house, which was later extended, is in brown brick, with dressings in pink sandstone, a string course, overhanging bracketed eaves, and hipped Welsh slate roofs. There are two storeys and three bays, the middle bay projecting slightly. In the centre, steps with walls lead up to a porch containing columns in antis with palm capitals. This is flanked by recesses and curved bay windows. The upper floor contains casement windows, the middle window with a transom, and a stone balcony with a pierced balustrade on curved brackets. To the left is a lower addition of 1938 with two storeys and four bays, and a hipped slate roof, containing sash windows.	II
