= Merton Barker =

English cricketer and field hockey player

Personal information
- Full name: Montague Merton Barker
- Born: 20 July 1867; Paddington, Middlesex, England
- Died: 12 January 1954 (aged 86); Epsom Downs, Surrey, England
- Batting: Right-handed

Career statistics
Competition	First-class
Matches	10
Runs scored	106
Batting average	7.57
100s/50s	–/–
Top score	30
Balls bowled	5
Wickets	0
Bowling average	–
5 wickets in innings	–
10 wickets in match	–
Best bowling	–
Catches/stumpings	11/–
- Source: Cricinfo, 30 July 2019

Montague Merton Barker (20 July 1867 – 12 January 1954) was an English first-class cricketer and international field hockey player.

The son of Montague Cochrane Barker, he was born at Paddington in July 1867. He was educated at Radley College. He toured the West Indies with R. S. Lucas' XI in 1894–95, making his debut in first-class cricket on the tour against Barbados at Bridgetown. He made seven further first-class appearances on the tour, scoring 94 runs at an average of 9.40 and a high score of 30. He later made two first-class appearances for the Marylebone Cricket Club against Leicestershire in 1895 and Derbyshire in 1896. Outside of cricket, he played field hockey as a half-back for England, captaining the team in 1898. He died at Epsom Downs in January 1954.
