= John Robinson (cricketer, born 1868) =

English cricketer

Personal information
- Full name: John Sandford Robinson
- Born: 5 February 1868; Arnold, Nottinghamshire, England
- Died: 21 April 1898 (aged 30); Worksop Manor, England
- Batting: Right-handed
- Role: Wicket-keeper

Domestic team information
- Years: Team
- 1888: Cambridge University
- 1888–1896: Nottinghamshire

Career statistics
Competition	FC
Matches	48
Runs scored	751
Batting average	11.04
100s/50s	0/2
Top score	72
Balls bowled	15
Wickets	–
Bowling average	–
5 wickets in innings	–
10 wickets in match	–
Best bowling	0/3
Catches/stumpings	41/3
- Source: Cricinfo, 4 August 2013

John Sandford Robinson (5 February 1868 – 21 April 1898) was an English cricketer. He played for Cambridge University, the Marylebone Cricket Club (MCC) and Nottinghamshire between 1888 and 1896. He was born at Arnold, Nottinghamshire and died at Worksop, also in Nottinghamshire. He was known during his lifetime as "Sandford Robinson" as his father was called "John Robinson".

== Biography ==
Robinson's father founded the successful Home Brewery in Daybrook, Arnold in 1875, later acquired Worksop Manor and was knighted in 1905; Sandford Robinson was sent to Harrow School and then he went to Trinity College, Cambridge. As a cricketer, he was a right-handed batsman and an occasional wicketkeeper, but neither at school nor at university did he make much impression: at Harrow he did not play in the grand set-piece cricket matches against the other major public schools, though he did appear in a 12-a-side match with the MCC in 1886. At Cambridge, he played in two trial games but was given only one chance in the first team: a match against the Gentlemen of England in which he opened the batting, scored 7 and 1, and took a catch in each innings. He did no better in a game for Nottinghamshire later in that season and in single matches in both 1889 and 1890 against Cambridge University – playing for an opposing team was a frequent ploy used by Cambridge when they wanted to try a cricketer out, but in Robinson's case it led to no further first-team appearances.

Robinson graduated from Cambridge University with a Bachelor of Arts degree in 1890. In 1891 and 1892, he played first-class cricket fairly regularly for Nottinghamshire, captaining the team on occasion, and for some amateur teams, though only in 1892 did he have any success: his two first-class scores of more than 50 both came in this season. His best innings was a score of 72 in the Nottinghamshire game against Middlesex when he put on 161 for the fifth wicket with Arthur Shrewsbury, who made 212. At the end of the 1892 English cricket season he joined Lord Hawke's cricket team in Ceylon and India in 1892–93, where he played in a single first-class match; he did not then appear at all in first-class cricket in 1893. He reappeared in Nottinghamshire matches in 1894 and occasionally kept wicket that season, and at the end of it he went on a second tour, this time with Lord Hawke to North America, where he played in two first-class cricket matches. He played occasionally in both 1895 and 1896 with no success.

Robinson had other interests outside cricket, though he appears not to have had a career or profession. He was a captain in the Robin Hood Rifles, a volunteer army unit raised in Nottinghamshire and he also played football for Worksop Town F. C. He was also engaged in field sports and a fall from his horse while hunting two weeks before he died was thought to have accelerated his death, which was unexpected.
