= Samuel Harvey Reynolds =

Samuel Harvey Reynolds (1831 – 7 February 1897) was the first pupil of Radley College and later became a renowned divine, journalist, and man of letters.

== Early life ==
He was the eldest son of Samuel Reynolds, F.R.C.S., a surgeon from Stoke Newington. He entered at Blundell's School in Tiverton on 6 February 1846, but left the following June. On the foundation of Radley College, in 1847, he became the second of only two pupils (the first to register was George Melhuish) when the school opened on 17 August 1847. In 1897 he wrote and published posthumously his reminiscences of the school. In it he described the terrible rioting, and ensuing beatings meted out by the bespectacled Warden. For a long time he remained the oldest boy in the school to whom Singleton and the other Fellows looked for responsibility towards the younger pupils. Boys ignored the Warden's censure to prayer, which he hid a multitude of bad habits and "inattention". He was scathing of Singleton's "treatment of his boys" although he had never actually been delegated duty as a Prefect.

In 1850 Reynolds was awarded a scholarship to Exeter College at Oxford, placed in the first-class degree in classics at moderations at Michaelmas 1852, and in the first class in literae humaniores at Easter 1854. In 1853 he obtained the Newdigate Prize and the Chancellor's English Essay Prize, his theme being 'The Ruins of Egyptian Thebes.'

On 2 February 1855 Reynolds was elected probationer fellow of Brasenose College, and actual fellow on 2 February 1856. He edited Bacon's essays and wrote Notes on the Iliad. He afterwards became tutor and bursar of the college. In 1856 he obtained the chancellor's prize for an English essay on ' The Reciprocal Action of the Physical and Moral Condition of Countries upon each other.' He proceeded M.A. in 1857.

== Priesthood ==
Intending to be called to the bar, Reynolds was admitted a student of Lincoln's Inn on 23 October 1858, and for some time read in the chambers of equity counsel. Following an accident which injured his eyesight he abandoned the law and returned to residence in Brasenose. In 1860 he took deacon's orders. He devoted himself to college work, and filled in succession the offices of Latin lecturer, tutor, and bursar.

In 1865 Reynolds on ordained a priest. During 1866, 1867, and 1868 he was classical examiner in the university. He wrote in 1865 a small treatise on the ' Rise of the Modern European System.' This was intended to form part of a ' System of Modern History,' published by an Edinburgh firm. In 1870 he edited, for the series known as the 'Catena Classicorum,' the first twelve books of the Homer's Iliad, with a preface and notes.

Reynolds was presented in March 1871 to the college living of East Ham, at that time a comparatively small district of about two thousand souls.

== Writing ==
Soon after his appointment to the parish at East Ham, Reynolds joined the staff of The Times, and between August 1873 and December 1896 contributed some two thousand leading articles on a variety of topics, literary, political, and financial. Some of the writings from The Times were reprinted in 1898, after his death, in a volume en titled 'Studies on many Subjects', which also includes a selection of articles written for the Westminster Review between 1861 and 1866. To these literary labours he added an edition with notes of Bacon's 'Essays' (1890) and of the 'Table-talk of John Selden' (1892).

== Personal and later life ==
Reynolds married, on 12 April 1871, Edith Claudia, daughter of the Rev. Claudius Sandys, military chaplain at Bombay.

Reynolds resigned his living in December 1893, and moved to The Gables, Abingdon, 'to be near enough to the Bodleian for study, and not near enough to Oxford for society.' Here he devoted himself to literary pursuits; but as his health failed he sought from time to time the milder climate of the south of France. He died at Biarritz on 7 February 1897, and was buried there two days later. He left no issue.

== Sources ==
- "Obituary of The Rev. S. Harvey Reynolds," The Times, 10 February 1897 (pg. 10; Issue 35123; col B)
- The Late Rev. S. Harvey Reynolds, "Letter to the Editor from The Rev Henry L Thompson," The Times, 11 February 1897 (pg. 7; Issue 35124; col F)
- The Late Rev. S. Harvey Reynolds, "Letter to the Editor from A.L Francis," The Times, Monday, 15 February 1897 (pg. 12; Issue 35127; col A)
