= Reginald Wickham =

English cricketer

Personal information
- Full name: Reginald William Wickham
- Born: 4 March 1871; Wetherby, Yorkshire, England
- Died: 4 December 1952 (aged 81); Harrogate, Yorkshire, England
- Batting: Unknown
- Bowling: Unknown

Career statistics
Competition	First-class
Matches	7
Runs scored	54
Batting average	7.71
100s/50s	–/–
Top score	20*
Balls bowled	974
Wickets	24
Bowling average	19.04
5 wickets in innings	1
10 wickets in match	–
Best bowling	5/38
Catches/stumpings	5/–
- Source: Cricinfo, 29 July 2019

Reginald William Wickham (4 March 1871 – 4 December 1952) was an English first-class cricketer.

The son of William Wickham Wickham and his wife, Katherine Henrietta Fairfax, he was born at Wetherby in March 1871. He toured the West Indies with Lord Hawke's XI 1896–97, making his debut in first-class cricket on the tour against Trinidad at Port of Spain. He made six further first-class appearances on the tour, playing further matches against Barbados and British Guiana. Playing primarily as a bowler, he took 24 wickets on the tour at an average of 19.04, with best figures of 5 for 38. These figures, which was his only first-class five wicket haul, came against British Guiana at Georgetown. With the bat, he scored 50 runs with a high score of 20 not out. He married Kathleen Wylie in 1907, with the couple having two children. He died at Harrogate in December 1952.
