= R. S. Lucas' cricket team in the West Indies in 1894–95 =

The team in St Kitts

A team of amateur cricketers under the captaincy of Robert Slade Lucas toured the West Indies in the 1894–95 season, playing matches between January and April 1895. They played a total of 16 matches of which eight are regarded as first-class. It was the first visit of an English cricket team to the West Indies.

== Touring team ==
The idea for the tour was mainly that of Dr R. B. Anderson, who had lived in Tobago for 23 years. Assistance was also provided by Lord Hawke, Lord Stamford and Neville Lubbock. The Royal Mail Steam Packet Company gave special terms for the round trip and concessions were made with regard to the telegraphic transmission of news. The tourists were to be the guests of the clubs in the different islands.

A party of 13 was taken:

Name	
Mr. R. S. Lucas (c)	Middlesex
Mr. M. M. Barker	Radley, M.C.C.
Mr. L. Barratt	Norfolk
Mr. R. Berens	Westminster and Oxford
Mr. H. R. Bromley-Davenport	Cambridge University
Mr. F. W. Bush	Surrey
Mr. J. M. Dawson	Cambridge University and Yorkshire Gentlemen
Mr. R. L. Marshall	Repton
Mr. A. A. Priestley	M.C.C.
Mr. R. P. Sewell	Essex
Mr. H. Smith-Turberville	M.C.C.
Mr. W. H. Wakefield	Oxford University and Liverpool
Mr. J. H. Weatherby	M.C.C.

Only five of the tourists had played any first-class cricket prior to the tour, and of these Bush, Sewell and Smith-Turberville had not played a first-class match since 1886. Only Lucas and Bromley-Davenport had played recently at first-class level. Lucas had played for Middlesex since 1891 and Bromley-Davenport for Cambridge University in 1892 and 1893. Indeed, only these two players ever played a significant amount of first-class cricket in England. The standard of the matches was therefore below that of first-class cricket in England. All the 13 played at least one first-class match on the tour.

The 13 left Southampton on the Medway on 16 January 1895 and reached Barbados on 28 January, playing their first match the next day.

== Matches ==
Matches played were:

- January 29, 30 : v Barbados
- January 31, February 1 : v United Services (in Barbados), 13-a-side
- February 5, 6, 7, 8, 9 : v Barbados
- February 14, 15, 16 : v Antigua
- February 18, 19 : v St. Kitts
- February 22, 23 : v St. Lucia, 12-a-side
- February 25 : v St. Vincent, 12-a-side
- February 28, March 1 : v Queen's Park C.C. (in St. Vincent), 12-a-side
- March 4, 5 : v All Trinidad
- March 16, 18 : v Demerara
- March 19, 20 : v Demerara
- March 30, April 1 : v All Jamaica, 12-a-side
- April 2, 3 : Jamaica Born
- April 5, 6 : v West Jamaica
- April 8, 9 : v North Jamaica, 12-a-side
- April 11, 12 : v All Jamaica

First-class matches are highlighted. A further match against Grenada in March was abandoned. The matches against Jamaica and Jamaica Born are recognised as the first first-class matches to take place in Jamaica.

Of the eight first-class matches, four were won, three lost and one drawn. Overall 10 matches were won, four lost and two drawn.

Dawson headed the batting averages with an average of 26 in the first-class games. Sewell was leading run scorer in the first-class games with 269 although in all matches Bush lead with 406 runs. Just two centuries were scored by the tourists both in the second match against Barbados. These were 101 by Bush and 138 by Dawson.

The bowling for the tourists was largely in the hands of Bromley-Davenport and Bush who each took over 50 wickets in the first-class matches. Sewell was next amongst the wicket-takers with 11. In all matches Bromley-Davenport and Bush each took over 100 wickets.

Most of the matches were low scoring. The one exception was the second match against Barbados. Barbados scored 517 although no-one scored a century, George Learmond top scoring with 86. Lucas's XI replied with 303 giving Barbados a first innings lead of 214. Following on, Lucas's XI then scored 396 and dismissed Barbados for 157 to win by 25 runs. Clifford Goodman, who had been successful in the first three innings against the tourists, taking 20 wickets, took just 1/121 in the tourists' second innings.

== Averages ==
The following averages are from the eight first-class matches (Batting Bowling).

=== Batting ===
Player	P	I	NO	R	HS	Ave	100	50	C/S
JM Dawson	5	7	0	184	138	26.28	1	–	6
RP Sewell	8	12	1	269	77	24.45	–	3	9
FW Bush	7	10	0	242	101	24.20	1	–	3
JH Weatherby	8	11	0	248	56	22.54	–	1	4
HT Smith-Turberville	1	2	1	20	14	20.00	–	–	–
HR Bromley-Davenport	8	11	0	212	91	19.27	–	1	12
RS Lucas	8	13	1	209	64	17.41	–	1	7
AA Priestley	8	11	1	144	36	14.40	–	–	5
R Berens	8	12	1	136	50	12.36	–	1	3
L Barratt	6	9	1	82	19	10.25	–	–	5
MM Barker	8	11	1	94	30	9.40	–	–	10
RL Marshall	8	11	5	55	19*	9.16	–	–	–
WH Wakefield	6	9	2	30	16	4.28	–	–	10/5

=== Bowling ===
Player	O	M	R	W	BB	Ave	5i	10m
HR Bromley-Davenport	307.4	108	561	56	7/17	10.01	5	1
FW Bush	284.4	90	610	51	7/25	11.96	5	2
RP Sewell	62.3	15	189	11	4/29	17.18	–	–
HT Smith-Turberville	5	0	28	1	1/28	28.00	–	–
L Barratt	33	8	89	3	3/75	29.66	–	–
RL Marshall	46	6	163	5	3/71	32.60	–	–
RS Lucas	28.4	0	153	3	2/111	51.00	–	–
MM Barker	1	0	7	0				

== Annual reviews ==
- James Lillywhite's Cricketers' Annual 1896, pages 39 to 56
- Wisden Cricketers' Almanack 1896, pages 400 to 402
