= Joseph Whitwell =

English cricketer

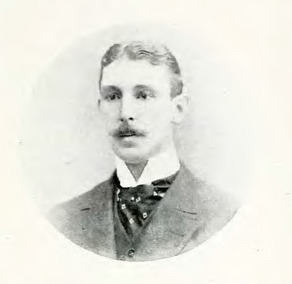
- Born: 22 February 1869; Saltburn-by-the-Sea
- Died: November 1932 (aged 62–63); Langbaurgh
- Alma mater: Uppingham School
- Occupation: Cricketer
- Parent(s): William Whitwell

Joseph Fry Whitwell (22 February 1869 – 6 November 1932) was an English amateur first-class cricketer, who played one match for Yorkshire County Cricket Club, against Nottinghamshire, at Trent Bridge in 1890.

Born in Saltburn-by-the-Sea, Yorkshire, England, Whitwell was a right-handed batsman, who scored four runs in both innings, and took one wicket for eleven runs. His only first-class victim, with his right arm medium pace, was William Scotton bowled for 20. Whitwell also played for Durham from 1895 to 1902, and was their captain from 1899 to 1902.

An ironmaster by trade, Whitwell also played for Norton C.C. and Saltburn C.C., plus he led Durham to the Minor Counties Championship title in 1901.

Whitwell died in November 1932, in Langbaurgh Hall, Great Ayton, Yorkshire having committed suicide by shooting himself. His brother, William Whitwell, played ten matches for Yorkshire.
