= William Whitwell =

English cricketer

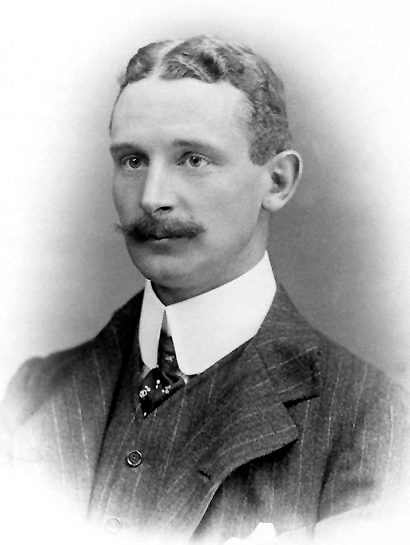
Portrait of Whitwell

William Fry Whitwell (12 December 1867 – 12 April 1942) was an English amateur first-class cricketer, who played in thirteen first-class matches between 1890 and 1900. Of those, ten were for Yorkshire County Cricket Club in 1890, two for Lord Hawke's XI in 1894, and one for The Gentlemen in 1900. He also played for Durham from 1895 to 1902, and was their captain from 1893 to 1896. His brother, Joseph Whitwell, played one match for Yorkshire, and also played for Durham.

Born in Stockton-on-Tees, County Durham, Whitwell was a right-arm fast bowler, who took thirty eight wickets at 17.94, with a best of 5 for 25 against the Philadelphians. He also took five wickets against Middlesex. Whitwell scored 93 runs at an average of 5.81, with a highest score of 26 against Cambridge University. He also took eight catches in the field.

He went on tour with Lord Hawke to North America in 1894, and took thirteen wickets in first-class matches there at an average of 6.23.

Whitwell died in April 1942, in Leazes Park, Newcastle upon Tyne.
