= Robert Marshall (cricketer, born 1869) =

English cricketer

Personal information
- Full name: Robert Lionel Marshall
- Born: 28 December 1869; Walsall, Staffordshire, England
- Died: 15 January 1937 (aged 67); Finchley, Middlesex, England
- Batting: Unknown
- Bowling: Unknown

Career statistics
Competition	First-class
Matches	8
Runs scored	55
Batting average	9.16
100s/50s	–/–
Top score	19*
Balls bowled	230
Wickets	5
Bowling average	32.60
5 wickets in innings	–
10 wickets in match	–
Best bowling	3/71
Catches/stumpings	–/–
- Source: Cricinfo, 31 July 2019

Robert Lionel Marshall (28 December 1869 – 15 January 1937) was an English first-class cricketer.

Marshall was born at Walsall in December 1869 and was educated at Repton School. He toured the West Indies with R. S. Lucas' XI in 1894–95, making his debut in first-class cricket on the tour against Barbados at Bridgetown. Marshall made seven further first-class appearances on the tour, playing additional matches against Demerara, Trinidad and Jamaica. He scored 55 runs on the tour at an average of 9.16 and a high score of 19 not out. With the ball, he took 5 wickets at a bowling average of 32.60 and best figures of 3 for 71. He died at Finchley in January 1937.
