= Lawrence Bathurst =

English cricketer (1871–1939)

Lawrence Charles Villebois Bathurst (4 June 1871 – 22 February 1939) was an English first-class cricketer active 1893–99 who played for Middlesex and Oxford University. He was born in Gressenhall, Norfolk; died in Bonchurch, Isle of Wight.

Bathurst served in the British Army during the Second Boer War. He volunteered for service in the Imperial Yeomanry, and was commissioned a lieutenant in the 30th battalion on 14 January 1902. The battalion left Southampton for South Africa four months later, and arrived in early May, shortly after conclusion of hostilities. They spent several months on regular patrol duties, and he left for home again with the battalion in December 1902, relinquishing his commission with the honorary rank of Lieutenant in the Army in February 1903.
