= Richard Berens (cricketer, born 1864) =

English cricketer and barrister

Personal information
- Born: 28 January 1864; St Mary Cray, Kent, England
- Died: 14 July 1909 (aged 45); Felixstowe, Suffolk, England
- Relatives: Richard Berens (grandfather)

Career statistics
Competition	First-class
Matches	17
Runs scored	283
Batting average	12.30
100s/50s	0/1
Top score	50
Catches/stumpings	4/–
- Source: Cricinfo, 25 April 2017

Richard Berens (28 January 1864 – 14 July 1909) was an English cricketer and a barrister.

Berens was educated at Westminster School and Christ Church, Oxford. He qualified as a barrister at the Inner Temple in 1892.

A club cricketer, Berens was invited to take part in two tours by English amateurs to the West Indies in 1894-95 and 1896-97 and one to North America in 1898. He played all of his first-class cricket career on these tours. He was a batsman, but his contributions were modest: the 37 and 50 he scored in the second match against Barbados on the first tour were the only innings in which he reached 25.

Berens married Elizabeth Evelyn Gibbons on 3 December 1900.
