= Robert Slade Lucas =

English cricketer

Robert Lucas
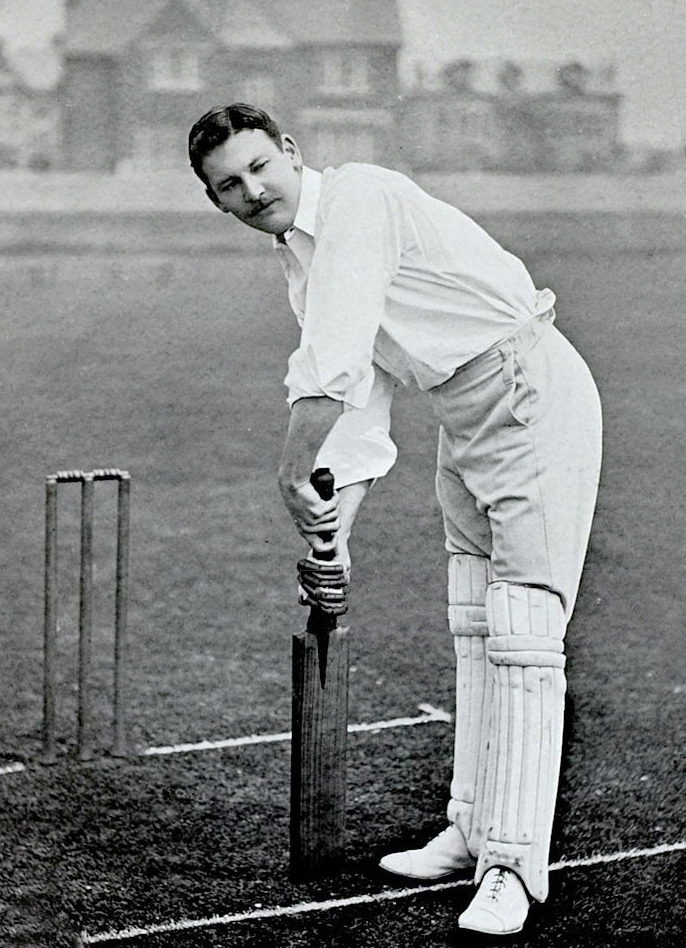

Personal information
- Full name: Robert Slade Lucas
- Born: 17 July 1867; Teddington, Middlesex, England
- Died: 5 January 1942 (aged 74); Franklands Village, Haywards Heath, Sussex, England
- Batting: Right-handed
- Bowling: Right-arm medium

Domestic team information
- Years: Team
- 1891–1900: Middlesex
- 1894–1895: Marylebone

Career statistics
Competition	First-class
Matches	93
Runs scored	2,685
Batting average	18.64
100s/50s	1/9
Top score	185
Balls bowled	378
Wickets	6
Bowling average	61.00
5 wickets in innings	0
10 wickets in match	0
Best bowling	2/44
Catches/stumpings	43/–
- Source: CricketArchive, 9 August 2012

Robert Slade Lucas (17 July 1867 – 5 January 1942) was an English cricketer who played for Middlesex. He was a right-handed batsman and occasional right-arm medium paced bowler. He captained a team to the West Indies in 1894–95.

Scores and Biographies Volume XV (1925) records that 'Lucas, Robert Slade, whose first match at Lord's was on 5 May 1887, for Eighteen Colts of Middlesex v M.C.C., was a batsman above the average, who could hit freely and well, a medium-paced bowler, and a fieldsman who took no place in particular. His name will be found in the Middlesex Eleven from 1891 to 1900, his highest score for the county being 185 v Sussex at Hove in 1895, when he and Mr. T.C. O'Brien (202) put on 338 runs together for the fifth wicket. In the same year he appeared in the Gentlemen v Players match at the Oval. In minor cricket he played chiefly with the Richmond and Teddington clubs, and for some time was honorary secretary of the latter. In 1891 he was elected captain of the Old Merchant Taylors, who played their first match in 1892. Was born at Ash Lodge, Teddington, Middlesex, on 17 July 1867. Height 5 ft. 11 in., and weight 12 st. 2 lb. Slade was educated at Merchant Taylors' School, where he was captain of the Eleven in 1885. In the course of an innings of 141 not out for Old Taylorians v Merchant Taylors School at Charterhouse Square on 3 July 1891, he hit the ball out of the ground seven times, twice in succession through the same window of a private house. At Bushy Park on 16 May 1896, he scored 280 not out for Teddington v Kensington Park. In 1894-5 he took a team on tour in the West indies, after having visited North America in the autumn of 1894 as a member of Lord Hawke's Team. For many years he was captain of the Teddington Hockey Club. Is not related to any other well-known cricketer of the same name'
