= List of Warwickshire County Cricket Club players =

This is a list in alphabetical order of cricketers who have played for Warwickshire in top-class matches since 1894. Founded in 1882, the club held minor status until it was classified as an unofficial first-class team by substantial sources in 1894; Warwickshire has been classified as a List A team since the beginning of limited overs cricket in 1963; and as a first-class Twenty20 team since the inauguration of the Twenty20 Cup in 2003.

The details are the player's usual name followed by the years in which he was active as a Warwickshire player and then his name is given as it usually appears on match scorecards. Note that many players represented other top-class teams besides Warwickshire and that some played for the club in minor counties cricket before 1894. Current players are shown as active to the latest season in which they played for the club. The list excludes Second XI and other players who did not play for the club's first team; and players whose first team appearances were in minor matches only.

== A ==
- Aamir Jamal (2024): Aamir Jamal
- Neal Abberley (1964–1979): RN Abberley
- Roy Abell (1967): RB Abell
- Mark Adair (2015–2017): MR Adair
- Charles Adderley (1946): CH Adderley
- Ashton Agar (2019): AC Agar
- Moeen Ali (2005–2025): MM Ali
- Shozair Ali (2013): SA Ali
- Tazeem Ali (2023–2025): TC Ali
- Jimmy Allan (1966–1968): JM Allan
- Sandy Allen (2002): APW Allen
- Tom Allin (2011–2013): TW Allin
- Darren Altree (1996–2000): DA Altree
- Tim Ambrose (2006–2019): TR Ambrose
- Dennis Amiss (1960–1987): DL Amiss
- James Anyon (2005–2009): JE Anyon
- Asif Din (1981–1995): Asif Din
- Jamie Atkinson (2013): JJ Atkinson
- Harry Austin (1919): H. Austin

== B ==
- Herbert Bainbridge (1894–1902): HW Bainbridge
- Charles Baker (1905–1920): CS Baker
- Michael Balac (2008): M Balac
- Ethan Bamber (2025): ER Bamber
- David Banks (1988–1989): DA Banks
- Liam Banks (2017–2019): L Banks
- Jack Bannister (1950–1969): JD Bannister
- Eric Barber (1936): EG Barber
- Bob Barber (1963–1971): RW Barber
- William Barber (1927–1933): WH Barber
- Alfred Barbery (1906–1907): AE Barbery
- Keith Barker (2009–2018): KHD Barker
- Maurice Barker (1946): MP Barker
- Ed Barnard (2023–2025): EG Barnard
- Michael Barnes (2007): MW Barnes
- Sydney Barnes (1894–1896): SF Barnes
- Terry Barnes (1956): TP Barnes
- Joseph Barton (1895–1896): J Barton
- Leonard Bates (1913–1935): LTA Bates
- Samuel Bates (1910–1912): SH Bates
- Martin Bayley (1969): MG Bayley
- Robert Baynton (1921–1923): RG Baynton
- Ian Bell (1999–2020): IR Bell
- Michael Bell (1992–1997): MAV Bell
- Chris Benjamin (2021–2024): CG Benjamin
- Harold Benjamin (1919): HL Benjamin
- Joey Benjamin (1988–1991): JE Benjamin
- Gwynfor Benson (1959–1961): GL Benson
- Dom Bess (2023): DM Bess
- Paul Best (2011–2014): PM Best
- Jacob Bethell (2021–2023): JG Bethell
- Melvyn Betts (2001–2003): MM Betts
- Ian Blackwell (2012): ID Blackwell
- Bill Blenkiron (1964–1974): W Blenkiron
- Shane Bond (2002): SE Bond
- Michael Booth (2023–2025): MG Booth
- Paul Booth (1990–1993): PA Booth
- Ant Botha (2007–2011): AG Botha
- Bill Bourne (1973–1977): WA Bourne
- Carlos Brathwaite (2021–2022): CR Brathwaite
- Kraigg Brathwaite (2023): KC Brathwaite
- Carl Breeden (1910): CL Breeden
- Tim Bresnan (2020–2021): TT Bresnan
- Vincent Brewster (1965): VC Brewster
- Basil Bridge (1955–1968): WB Bridge
- Danny Briggs (2021–2025): DR Briggs
- Reginald Brindle (1949): RG Brindle
- Ralph Broberg (1920): RF Broberg
- Philip Bromley (1947–1956): PH Bromley
- Ethan Brookes (2019–2023): EA Brookes
- Henry Brookes (2017–2023): HJH Brookes
- Albert Brown (1932): A Brown
- David Brown (1961–1982): DJ Brown
- Dougie Brown (1991–2007): DR Brown
- Eddie Brown (1932–1934): E Brown
- John Brown (1913–1914): JD Brown
- John Buckingham (1933–1939): J Buckingham
- Neville Bulpitt (1979): NJ Bulpitt
- Michael Burgess (2019–2024): MGK Burgess
- Mike Burns (1991–1996): M Burns
- Reginald Burton (1919): RHM Burton
- Harold Busher (1908): HA Busher
- George Byrne (1912): GR Byrne
- James Byrne (1897–1912): JF Byrne

== C ==
- Freddie Calthorpe (1919–1930): FSG Calthorpe
- Victor Cannings (1947–1949): VHD Cannings
- Neil Carter (2001–2012): NM Carter
- Ray Carter (1951–1961): RG Carter
- Tom Cartwright (1952–1969): TW Cartwright
- Karl Carver (2021): K Carver
- Ashish Chakrapani (2021): AM Chakrapani
- Maurice Chambers (2013): MA Chambers
- Shivnarine Chanderpaul (2011): S Chanderpaul
- Crowther Charlesworth (1898–1921): C Charlesworth
- Varun Chopra (2010–2016): V Chopra
- Shaaiq Choudhry (2009): SH Choudhry
- Michael Clark (2003): MW Clark
- Rikki Clarke (2008–2017): R Clarke
- William Clarkson (1922–1923): W Clarkson
- John Claughton (1979–1980): JA Claughton
- Christopher Clifford (1978–1980): CC Clifford
- Ian Clifford (2002–2004): JI Clifford
- Lin Clugston (1928–1946): DL Clugston
- Freddie Coleman (2013–2015): FRJ Coleman
- Tom Collin (1933–1936): T Collin
- Corey Collymore (2003): CD Collymore
- David Cook (1962–1968): DR Cook
- Michael Cook (1961–1962): MS Cook
- Robert Cooke (1925–1926): R Cooke
- John Cordner (1952): JP Cordner
- Robert Cotton (1947): RH Cotton
- Charles Cowan (1909–1921): CFR Cowan
- Peter Cranmer (1934–1954): P Cranmer
- Alexander Crawford (1911): AB Crawford
- Joseph Cresswell (1895–1899): J Cresswell
- Henry Crichton (1908): HT Crichton
- Eric Crockford (1911–1922): EB Crockford
- Alfred Croom (1922–1939): AJW Croom
- Leslie Croom (1949): LCB Croom
- Anthony Cross (1969): AJ Cross
- Eric Cross (1921–1923): EP Cross
- Jim Cumbes (1982): J Cumbes
- Arthur Curle (1920): AC Curle
- Gerald Curle (1913): G Curle

== D ==
- Lee Daggett (2006–2008): LM Daggett
- Charles Dagnall (1999–2001): CE Dagnall
- Alex Davies (2022–2025): AL Davies
- Conrad Davies (1930–1936): CSS Davies
- Richard Davies (1976): RJ Davies
- Richard Davis (1993/94–1995): RP Davis
- Colin de Grandhomme (2017–2018): C de Grandhomme
- Steven Dean (1993): SJ Dean
- Stewie Dempster (1946): CS Dempster
- Jack Devey (1894–1907): JHG Devey
- Frederick Dickens (1898–1903): F Dickens
- Edwin Diver (1894–1901): EJ Diver
- Frederick Dobson (1928): F Dobson
- Kenneth Dobson (1925): KWC Dobson
- Ludford Docker (1894–1895): LC Docker
- Tom Dollery (1934–1955): HE Dollery
- Keith Dollery (1951–1956): KR Dollery
- Allan Donald (1987–2000): AA Donald
- Martin Donnelly (1948–1950): MP Donnelly
- Dilip Doshi (1980–1981): DR Doshi
- Dan Douthwaite (2018): DA Douthwaite
- Vasbert Drakes (2001): VC Drakes
- Paul Dunkels (1971): PR Dunkels
- Thomas Durnell (1921–1930): TW Durnell
- Robin Dyer (1981–1986): RIHB Dyer

== E ==
- Michael Edmond (1996–1999): MD Edmond
- Roger Edmonds (1962–1967): RB Edmonds
- Fidel Edwards (2019): FH Edwards
- Grant Elliott (2017–2018): GD Elliott
- Gus Elson (1947): G Elson
- Stuart Eustace (2005): SM Eustace
- Laurie Evans (2010–2016): LJ Evans
- Russell Everitt (1909): RS Everitt

== F ==
- Arthur Fabling (1921): AH Fabling
- Bill Fantham (1935–1948): WE Fantham
- George Farren (1912): GC Farren
- Vishwa Fernando (2025): MVT Fernando
- Anton Ferreira (1979–1986): AM Ferreira
- Charles Fiddian-Green (1920–1928): CAF Fiddian-Green
- Frank Field (1897–1920): EF Field
- Max Field (1974–1975): MN Field
- Tom Fishwick (1896–1909): TS Fishwick
- Kevin Flaherty (1969): KF Flaherty
- Damien Fleming (2002): DW Fleming
- Barry Fletcher (1956–1961): BE Fletcher
- Barry Flick (1969–1973): BJ Flick
- Derrick Flint (1948–1949): D Flint
- Russell Flower (1978): RW Flower
- Thomas Forrester (1896–1899): T Forrester
- Arthur Foster (1914): AW Foster
- Derek Foster (1928–1934): DG Foster
- Frank Foster (1908–1914): FR Foster
- Zak Foulkes (2024): ZG Foulkes
- John Fox (1922–1928): J Fox
- Jackie Fox (1959–1961): JG Fox
- Reginald Franklin (1900): RC Franklin
- Tony Frost (1997–2009): T Frost

== G ==
- Fred Gardner (1947–1961): FC Gardner
- Keith Gardom (1973–1974): BK Gardom
- George Garrett (2019–2023): GA Garrett
- George Garton (2024–2025): GHS Garton
- Howard Gaunt (1919–1922): HCA Gaunt
- Billy George (1901–1906): W George
- Lance Gibbs (1967–1973): LR Gibbs
- Ed Giddins (1998–2000): ESH Giddins
- Norman Gifford (1983–1988): N Gifford
- Nathan Gilchrist (2025): NN Gilchrist
- Ashley Giles (1993–2005): AF Giles
- Albert Gittins (1919) : AE Gittins
- John Glassford (1969): J Glassford
- Richard Gleeson (2024–2025): RJ Gleeson
- Alfred Glover (1895–1909): ACS Glover
- Brian Glynn (1959–1961): BT Glynn
- Stanley Gobey (1946): SC Gobey
- Cyril Goodway (1937–1947): CC Goodway
- Harold Goodwin (1907–1912): HJ Goodwin
- Alan Gordon (1966–1971): A Gordon
- Recordo Gordon (2013–2016): RO Gordon
- Richard Granville (1934): RS Granville
- John Gray (1968–1969): JD Gray
- Albert Grayland (1922–1930): AV Grayland
- Chris Green (2019): CJ Green
- John Green (1927): JH Green
- Simon Green (1988–1991): SJ Green
- Thomas Greening (1912): T Greening
- Shirley Griffiths (1956–1958): SS Griffiths
- Tim Groenewald (2006–2008): TD Groenewald
- Frederick Gross (1934): FA Gross
- Charles Grove (1938–1953): CWC Grove
- John Guy (1950): JB Guy

== H ==
- John Hacking (1946): JK Hacking
- Sam Hain (2013–2025): SR Hain
- William Hall (1905): W Hall
- William Hampton (1922): WM Hampton
- Barry Hands (1946–1947): BO Hands
- William Hands (1909–1920): WC Hands
- Oliver Hannon-Dalby (2012–2025): OJ Hannon-Dalby
- Sam Hargreave (1899–1909): S Hargreave
- Archibald Harris (1919): AJ Harris
- Dennis Harris (1946): DF Harris
- Earl Harris (1975): EJ Harris
- Paul Harris (2006–2007): PL Harris
- William Harris (1904–1919): WH Harris
- Paul Harrison (2005): PW Harrison
- Peter Hartley (1982): PJ Hartley
- Bill Harvey (1927): WH Harvey
- Hasan Ali (2023–2025): Hasan Ali
- Alec Hastilow (1919): CAF Hastilow
- Christopher Hawkins (1957): CG Hawkins
- Albert Hayhurst (1934–1935): A Hayhurst
- David Heath (1949–1953): DMW Heath
- Mike Hellawell (1962): MS Hellawell
- Eddie Hemmings (1966–1978): EE Hemmings
- David Hemp (1997–2001): DL Hemp
- Edward Hewetson (1919–1927): EP Hewetson
- Eric Hewitt (1954): EJ Hewitt
- George Hickman (1929): G Hickman
- Thomas Hilditch (1907–1913): TA Hilditch
- Alfred Hill (1920): AJB Hill
- Geoffrey Hill (1958–1960): GH Hill
- Henry Hill (1894–1900): HBG Hill
- John Hill (1894–1898): JE Hill
- Aubrey Hill (1929–1948): WA Hill
- Raymond Hitchcock (1949–1964): RE Hitchcock
- Dean Hodgson (1987): GD Hodgson
- Dean Hoffman (1985): DS Hoffman
- Brad Hogg (2004): GB Hogg
- Willie Hogg (1981–1983): W Hogg
- William Holbech (1910): WH Holbech
- Chemar Holder (2021): CK Holder
- Romilly Holdsworth (1919–1921): RL Holdsworth
- Stuart Hole (2007–2008): SM Hole
- Eric Hollies (1932–1957): WE Hollies
- Piran Holloway (1988–1993): PCL Holloway
- Maurice Holmes (2011): MG Holmes
- David Hopkins (1977–1981): DC Hopkins
- Frank Hopkins (1898–1903): FJ Hopkins
- Norman Horner (1951–1965): NF Horner
- Adam Hose (2017–2022): AJ Hose
- John Hossell (1939–1947): JJ Hossell
- Eric Houghton (1946–1947): WE Houghton
- Albert Howell (1919–1922): AL Howell
- Harry Howell (1913–1928): H Howell
- Geoff Humpage (1974–1990): GW Humpage
- Alfred Hyde (1905–1907): AJ Hyde

== I ==
- Edward Illingworth (1920): EA Illingworth
- Imran Tahir (2010): Imran Tahir

== J ==
- Arnold Jackson (1928–1931): AK Jackson
- Nick James (2006–2008): NA James
- John Jameson (1960–1976): JA Jameson
- Thomas Jameson (1970): TEN Jameson
- Vaansh Jani (2025): VL Jani (Note: Jani made his first-class debut in July 2025 against Essex, and made his List A debut in August 2025 against Yorkshire. He had previously played for the Warwickshire Second XI, Buckinghamshire and the Middlesex Academy.)
- Harold Jarrett (1932–1933): HH Jarrett
- Ateeq Javid (2009–2017): A Javid
- Percy Jeeves (1912–1914): P Jeeves
- George Jennings (1923–1925): GA Jennings
- Manraj Johal (2021): MS Johal
- Richard Johnson (2008–2012): RM Johnson
- Keith Jones (1969–1973): AKC Jones
- Huw Jones (2002): HR Jones
- Richard Jones (2013–2016): RA Jones
- Richard Jones (1946): RH Jones

== K ==
- Alvin Kallicharran (1971–1990): AI Kallicharran
- Rohan Kanhai (1968–1977): RB Kanhai
- Abdul Hafeez Kardar (1948–1950): AH Kardar
- Vikai Kelley (2020): VV Kelley
- George Kemp-Welch (1927–1935): GD Kemp-Welch
- Jack Kendall (1948–1949): JT Kendall
- John Kennedy (1960–1962): JM Kennedy
- Kenneth Kent (1927–1931): KG Kent
- Kevin Kerr (1986): KJ Kerr
- Khalid Ibadulla (1954–1972): Khalid Ibadulla
- Wasim Khan (1992–1997): WG Khan
- Norman Kilner (1924–1937): N. Kilner
- Edmund King (1928–1932): EH King
- Ian King (1952–1955): IM King
- James Kingston (1894): JP Kingston
- Septimus Kinneir (1898–1914): S Kinneir
- Edwin Kirk (1898): E Kirk
- Harold Kirton (1925–1929): HO Kirton
- Frederik Klokker (2006): FA Klokker
- Nick Knight (1994/95–2006): NV Knight
- Herbert Knutton (1894): HJ Knutton

== L ==
- Matthew Lamb (2016–2022): MJ Lamb
- Albert Lane (1919–1925): AF Lane
- Colin Langley (1908–1914): CK Langley
- Brian Lara (1994–1998): BC Lara
- Hubert Latham (1955–1959): HJ Latham
- Tom Latham (2025): TWM Latham
- Alfred Law (1894–1899): A Law
- Clive Leach (1955–1958): CW Leach
- Eddie Leadbeater (1957–1958): E Leadbeater
- Eddie Legard (1962–1968): E Legard
- Toby Lester (2019): TS Lester
- Christopher Lethbridge (1981–1985): C Lethbridge
- Peter Lewington (1970–1982): PJ Lewington
- Esmond Lewis (1949–1958): EB Lewis
- Tom Lewis (2015): TP Lewis
- Dick Lilley (1894–1911): AFA Lilley
- Jake Lintott (2020–2025): JB Lintott
- Andy Lloyd (1976–1992): TA Lloyd
- Bryan Lobb (1953): B Lobb
- Gordon Lord (1983–1986): GJ Lord
- William Lord (1897–1899): WA Lord
- Alex Loudon (2005–2007): AGR Loudon
- Frank Loveitt (1898–1905): FR Loveitt
- John Lowe (1907): JCM Lowe
- Peter Lowe (1964): PJ Lowe
- Verner Luckin (1919): VV Luckin
- John Lynes (1897–1905): J Lynes

== M ==
- Calum MacLeod (2008–2009): CS MacLeod
- Darren Maddy (2007–2013): DL Maddy
- George Maddy (2022): GW Maddy (Note: Maddy made his List A debut in August 2022 against Durham. He had previously played for the Warwickshire Second XI and the Warwickshire Academy.)
- Keith Maguire (1982): KR Maguire
- Pieter Malan (2021): PJ Malan
- Zen Malik (2024–2025): ZA Malik
- Joseph Manton (1898): J Manton
- Francis Marshall (1922): FW Marshall
- Gordon Marshall (1961–1963): GA Marshall
- Jack Marshall (1946–1950): JMA Marshall
- Chris Martin (2008): CS Martin
- Edward Matheson (1899): E Matheson
- Ron Maudsley (1946–1951): RH Maudsley
- Glenn Maxwell (2023): GJ Maxwell
- Joseph Mayer (1926–1939): JH Mayer
- Kyle Mayers (2021): KR Mayers
- Chris Maynard (1977–1982): C Maynard
- Nathan McAndrew (2022): NJ McAndrew
- Brendon McCullum (2015): BB McCullum
- Jamie McDowall (1969–1973): JI McDowall
- Peter McKay (2013–2015): PJ McKay
- Brian McMillan (1986): BM McMillan
- Norman McVicker (1969–1973): NM McVicker
- Richard Mead-Briggs (1946): R Mead-Briggs
- Tom Mees (2005): T Mees
- William Meldon (1909–1910): WW Meldon
- Alex Mellor (2016–2019): AJ Mellor
- James Melville (1946): J Melville
- Michael Mence (1962–1965): MD Mence
- Tony Merrick (1987–1989): TA Merrick
- Chris Metters (2011): CL Metters
- James Meunier (1920): JB Meunier
- Ben Mike (2019): BWM Mike
- Edward Milburn (1987): ET Milburn
- Craig Miles (2019–2025): CN Miles
- Andrew Miller (2008–2012): AS Miller
- Harry Miller (1928): HR Miller
- Ronnie Miller (1961–1968): R Miller
- John Mills (1946): JM Mills
- Tom Milnes (2011–2019): TP Milnes
- Mir Hamza (2023): Mir Hamza
- Frank Mitchell (1946–1948): FR Mitchell
- Mohammad Yousuf (2011): Mohammad Yousuf
- Andy Moles (1986–1997): AJ Moles
- Steve Monkhouse (1985–1986): S Monkhouse
- Tom Moody (1990): TM Moody
- Fred Moorhouse (1900–1908): F Moorhouse
- Leonard Morris (1925–1926): LJ Morris
- Frank Morter (1922): FW Morter
- John Morton (1929–1930): J Morton
- William Morton (1984–1985): W Morton
- Dan Mousley (2019–2025): DR Mousley
- Tim Munton (1985–1999): TA Munton
- Athol Murray (1922): AL Murray
- Deryck Murray (1972–1975): DL Murray
- Simon Myles (1988): SD Myles

== N ==
- Alfred Nelson (1895): AL Nelson
- Guy Nelson (1921–1922): GMB Nelson
- Nathan Newport (2009): NA Newport
- Ernest Norton (1920): EW Norton
- Liam Norwell (2019–2022): LC Norwell
- Makhaya Ntini (2005): M Ntini

== O ==
- Dennis Oakes (1962–1965): DR Oakes
- Collins Obuya (2003): CO Obuya
- Alan Old (1969): AGB Old
- Chris Old (1983–1985): CM Old
- Philip Oliver (1975–1982): PR Oliver
- James Ord (2009–2010): JE Ord
- Jimmy Ord (1933–1953): JS Ord
- Christopher O'Rourke (1968): C O'Rourke
- Dominic Ostler (1990–2004): DP Ostler

== P ==
- George Paine (1929–1947): GAE Paine
- Henry Pallett (1894–1898): HJ Pallett
- George Palmer (1928): GA Palmer
- George Panayi (2017–2019): GD Panayi
- Krunal Pandya (2022): KH Pandya
- Luke Parker (2005–2008): LC Parker
- Howard Parkes (1898): HR Parkes
- Matthew Parry (1908–1910): MC Parry
- Gordon Parsons (1986–1988): GJ Parsons
- Jack Parsons (1910–1934): JH Parsons
- Norman Partridge (1921–1937): NE Partridge
- Jeetan Patel (2009–2020): JS Patel
- Nigel Paul (1954–1955): NA Paul
- William Peare (1926): WG Peare
- Godfrey Pell (1947): GA Pell
- Trevor Penney (1991/92–2005): TL Penney
- Edward Pereira (1895–1896): ET Pereira
- Hubert Perkins (1926–1927): HG Perkins
- Stephen Perryman (1974–1981): SP Perryman
- Hugh Phillips (1951): HR Phillips
- Joseph Phillips (1904–1911): JH Phillips
- Adrian Pierson (1985–1991): ARK Pierson
- Steffan Piolet (2009–2013): SA Piolet
- Keith Piper (1989–2005): KJ Piper
- Ed Pollock (2019–2021): EJ Pollock
- Shaun Pollock (1996–2002): SM Pollock
- Navdeep Poonia (2006–2009): N.S Poonia
- William Porterfield (2011–2017): WTS Porterfield
- Wilfred Potter (1932): W Potter
- Mike Powell (1996–2008): MJ Powell
- Rowland Powell-Williams (1897–1898): R Powell-Williams
- Stuart Poynter (2013): SW Poynter
- Josh Poysden (2014–2018): JE Poysden
- Dewald Pretorius (2004–2005): D Pretorius
- Reggie Pridmore (1909–1912): RG Pridmore
- Tom Pritchard (1946–1955): TL Pritchard
- John Pugh (1922–1927): JG Pugh

== Q ==
- Bernard Quaife (1920–1926): BW Quaife
- Walter Quaife (1894–1901): W Quaife
- Willie Quaife (1894–1928): WG Quaife

== R ==
- Michael Rae (2024): MD Rae
- Boyd Rankin (2008–2018): WB Rankin
- David Ratcliffe (1957–1968): DP Ratcliffe
- Jason Ratcliffe (1988–1994): JD Ratcliffe
- Dermot Reeve (1988–1996): DA Reeve
- James Rhodes (1895): J Rhodes
- Thomas Rhodes (1899): TB Rhodes
- Will Rhodes (2018–2024): WHM Rhodes
- Ignatius Rice (1920): WI Rice
- Walter Richards (1895–1896): W Richards
- Alan Richardson (1999–2004): A Richardson
- Bryan Richardson (1963–1967): BA Richardson
- Stanley Richardson (1920): SH Richardson
- Terence Riley (1961–1964): TMN Riley
- Harry Roberts (1949–1950): HE Roberts
- Harley Roberts (1932–1937): HJ Roberts
- Derrick Robins (1947): DH Robins
- Maurice Robinson (1951–1952): M Robinson
- Lloyd Robinson (1946): TL Robinson
- Corey Rocchiccioli (2025): CJ Rocchiccioli
- Henry Roll (1927): HT Roll
- Luke Ronchi (2016): L Ronchi
- Gerard Rotherham (1919–1921): GA Rotherham
- Hugh Rotherham (1903): H Rotherham
- Stephen Rouse (1970–1981): SJ Rouse
- Chris Rushworth (2023–2025): C Rushworth
- John Russell (1920): JB Russell

== S ==
- Dick Sale (1939–1947): R Sale
- Alfie Sam (1979): CA Sam (Note: Sam made his List A debut in September 1979 against Gloucestershire. He had previously played for the Warwickshire Second XI.)
- Ian Salisbury (2008): IDK Salisbury
- Wilfred Sanders (1928–1934): W Sanders
- Gerald Sanderson (1901): GB Sanderson
- Kumar Sangakkara (2007): KC Sangakkara
- Reg Santall (1919–1939): FR Santall
- Sydney Santall (1894–1914): S Santall
- Richard Savage (1976–1979): RL Savage
- Reginald Scorer (1921–1926): RI Scorer
- Hamza Shaikh (2022–2025): H Shaikh
- Adam Shantry (2005–2007): AJ Shantry
- Norman Sharp (1923): N Sharp
- Dennis Shaw (1949): DG Shaw
- Mohammed Sheikh (1997–2003): MA Sheikh
- John Shilton (1894–1895): JE Shilton
- Shoaib Malik (2014): Shoaib Malik
- Norman Shortland (1938–1950): NA Shortland
- Charles Shuckburgh (1930): CGS Shuckburgh
- Dominic Sibley (2017–2022): DP Sibley
- Ryan Sidebottom (2017–2022): RN Sidebottom
- Che Simmons (2024–2025): CB Simmons
- Harry Simms (1921–1922): HL Simms
- Anurag Singh (1995–2000): A Singh
- Mohammed Siraj (2022): M Siraj
- Gladstone Small (1980–1999): GC Small
- Cyril Smart (1920–1922): CC Smart
- Jack Smart (1919–1936): JA Smart
- Alan Smith (1958–1974): AC Smith
- David Smith (1981–1983): DM Smith
- Tiger Smith (1904–1930): EJ Smith
- Gareth Smith (1990): G Smith
- Harry Smith (1912): HW Smith
- Irving Smith (1905): IW Smith
- Kai Smith (2022–2025): K Smith
- David Smith (1973–1985): KD Smith
- M. J. K. Smith (1956–1975): MJK Smith
- Neil Smith (1987–2003): NMK Smith
- Paul Smith (1982–1996): PA Smith
- William Smith (1906): WJ Smith
- John Snow (1980): JA Snow
- Andrew Speed (1927–1928): AW Speed
- Harry Spencer (1930): HNE Spencer
- Jamie Spires (2001–2002): JAS Spires
- Dick Spooner (1948–1959): RT Spooner
- Sreesanth (2009): S Sreesanth
- Frank Stephens (1907–1912): FG Stephens
- George Stephens (1907–1925): GW Stephens
- John Stevenson (1919): JF Stevenson
- Jim Stewart (1955–1969): WJP Stewart
- Dale Steyn (2007): DW Steyn
- Paul Stirling (2022–2023): PR Stirling
- Oli Stone (2017–2022): OP Stone
- Alastair Storie (1987–1988): AC Storie
- Heath Streak (2004–2007): HH Streak
- Lawrence Street (1946): LC Street
- Norman Street (1908): NK Street
- Ernest Suckling (1919): E Suckling
- Sukhjit Singh (2017–2018): Sukhjit Singh
- Simon Sutcliffe (1981–1983): SP Sutcliffe
- Swaranjit Singh (1956–1958): Swaranjit Singh
- Adam Sylvester (2025): AR Sylvester (Note: Sylvester made his Twenty20 debut in May 2025 against Nottinghamshire, and his List A debut in August 2025 against Kent. He had previously played for Derbyshire where he made his first-class debut in 2022.)

== T ==
- Naqaash Tahir (2004–2011): NS Tahir
- Cecil Tate (1931–1933): CF Tate
- Frederick Tayler (1910): FE Tayler
- Albert Taylor (1927): AE Taylor
- Arthur Taylor (1913): A Taylor
- Charles Taylor (1908–1909): CJ Taylor
- Chilton Taylor (1970): CRV Taylor
- Derief Taylor (1948–1950): DDS Taylor
- Don Taylor (1949–1953): DD Taylor
- Frederick Taylor (1939): F Taylor
- Ken Taylor (1946–1949): KA Taylor
- Geoffrey Tedstone (1982–1988): GA Tedstone
- Peter Tennant (1964): PN Tennant
- Alfonso Thomas (2007): AC Thomas
- Gary Thomas (1978–1981): GP Thomas
- Aaron Thomason (2014–2019): AD Thomason
- John Thompson (1938–1954): JR Thompson
- Roly Thompson (1949–1962): RG Thompson
- Alex Thomson (2017–2020): AT Thomson
- David Thorne (1983–1989): DA Thorne
- Grant Thornton (2017): GT Thornton
- Warwick Tidy (1970–1974): WN Tidy
- Brian Timms (1969–1971): BSV Timms
- Alan Townsend (1948–1960): A Townsend
- Jonathan Trott (2003–2018): IJL Trott
- Jim Troughton (2001–2014): JO Troughton
- Richard Tudor (1976): RT Tudor
- Roger Twose (1989–1995): RG Twose
- George Tyler (1919): GE Tyler

== U ==
- Andrew Umeed (2016–2018): ARI Umeed

== V ==
- Vaughn van Jaarsveld (2007): VB van Jaarsveld
- Kiel van Vollenhoven (2021): KT van Vollenhoven
- Horace Venn (1919–1925): H Venn
- Daniel Vettori (2006): DL Vettori
- Hanuma Vihari (2021): GH Vihari

== W ==
- Mick Waddy (1919–1922): EF Waddy
- Matthew Wade (2016): MS Wade
- Graham Wagg (2002–2004): GG Wagg
- Mark Wagh (1997–2006): MA Wagh
- James Wainman (2019): JC Wainman
- Gilbert Walker (1912): G Walker
- Stephen Wall (1984–1985): S Wall
- Waqar Younis (2003): Waqar Younis
- Leslie Ward (1930): LM Ward
- William Ward (1895–1904): W Ward
- John Waring (1967): JS Waring
- Graham Warner (1966–1971): GS Warner
- Nick Warren (2002–2005): NA Warren
- Albert Wassell (1923): A Wassell
- Thomas Watson (1904): TH Watson
- Jonathon Webb (2014–2015): JP Webb
- Beau Webster (2025): BJ Webster
- Rudi Webster (1962–1966): RV Webster
- Ray Weeks (1950–1957): RT Weeks
- Graeme Welch (1991–2000): G Welch
- George Weldrick (1906–1907): G Weldrick
- James Welford (1896): JW Welford
- Ian Westwood (2003–2017): IJ Westwood
- Brad Wheal (2022): BTJ Wheal
- Ossie Wheatley (1957–1960): OS Wheatley
- Allan White (1936–1937): AFT White
- Henry White (1923): HA White
- Malcolm White (1946): MF White
- James Whitehead (1902): JG Whitehead
- James Whitehead (1894–1900): SJ Whitehead
- John Whitehouse (1971–1980): J Whitehouse
- Percy Whitehouse (1926): PG Whitehouse
- Albert Whittle (1900–1906): AEM Whittle
- Owen Williams (1967): OL Williams
- Bob Willis (1972–1984): RGD Willis
- Kilburn Wilmot (1931–1939): K Wilmot
- Ben Wilson (1951): BA Wilson
- Jimmy Windridge (1909–1913): JE Windridge
- Chris Woakes (2006–2025): CR Woakes
- Bert Wolton (1947–1960): AVG Wolton
- Alfred Woodroffe (1947–1948): A Woodroffe
- Simon Wootton (1981–1983): SH Wootton
- Albert Wright (1960–1964): A Wright
- Chris Wright (2011–2018): CJC Wright
- Bob Wyatt (1923–1939): RES Wyatt
- Theo Wylie (2024): TO Wylie

== Y ==
- Jayant Yadav (2022): J Yadav
- Rob Yates (2019–2025): RM Yates
- Michael Youll (1956–1957): M Youll
- Will Young (2025): WA Young

== Z ==
- Monde Zondeki (2008): M Zondeki
