= Irving Smith =

Irving Smith may refer to:

- Irving Smith (cricketer) (1884–1971), English cricketer
- Irving Smith (RAF officer), New Zealand flying ace of the Royal Air Force

== See also ==
- Irv Smith (disambiguation)
- Irvin Smith (born 1967), American football defensive back
