= Dennis Harris =

Dennis Harris may refer to:

- Dennis Harris (alternative medicine) (born 1938), medical doctor known for selling alternative medicine remedies
- Dennis Harris (cricketer) (1911–1959), English cricketer
- Dennis Harris (rugby league), rugby league footballer of the 1960s and 1970s for Castleford
- Dennis Harris (musician), Philadelphia session musician and arranger
