= Leonard Morris =

Leonard Morris may refer to:

- Leonard Morris (sheriff)
- Leonard Morris (cricketer)
