= 1968 English cricket season =

1968 was the 69th season of County Championship cricket in England and it was something of a watershed for it was the last in which the County Championship predominated. From 1969, a new limited overs league began and the number of Championship matches was therefore reduced. A system of batting and bowling bonus points was introduced into the County Championship, replacing the long- established "first innings points". The season was a watershed for Yorkshire too as, although they won their third successive championship title, the team broke up at the end of the season. The great fast bowler Fred Trueman retired and, following a stalemate in his contractual talks, Ray Illingworth left the club. Yorkshire did not win the title again until 2001. England and Australia drew the Test series with one win apiece so Australia retained the Ashes.

County clubs were able to sign one overseas player who would not be subject to the normal residential qualification rules and so could appear for them immediately. All counties, with the notable exception of Yorkshire, took advantage of this. Nottinghamshire pulled off the coup of signing Gary Sobers. Other players signed were Lee Irvine, Majid Khan, Mike Procter, Barry Richards, Asif Iqbal, Farokh Engineer, Hylton Ackerman, Greg Chappell, Rohan Kanhai and Vanburn Holder.

== Honours ==
- County Championship – Yorkshire
- Gillette Cup – Warwickshire
- Minor Counties Championship – Yorkshire II
- Second XI Championship – Surrey II
- Wisden – Jimmy Binks, David Green, Barry Richards, Derek Underwood, Ossie Wheatley

== Test series ==
Cumulative record – Test wins	1876–1968
England	66
Australia	80
Drawn	57

== Leading batsmen ==
Geoff Boycott topped the averages with 1487 runs @ 64.65.

== Leading bowlers ==
Ossie Wheatley topped the averages with 82 wickets @ 12.95.

== Annual reviews ==
- Playfair Cricket Annual 1969
- Wisden Cricketers' Almanack 1969
