= Samuel Bates =

Samuel Bates may refer to:

- Samuel Penniman Bates (1827–1902), American educator, author, and historian
- Samuel Bates (cricketer) (1890–1916), English cricketer

== See also ==
- Sam Bates (disambiguation)
