= Loveitt =

Loveitt is a surname. Notable people with the surname include:

- Frank Loveitt (1871–1939), English cricketer
- Herbert Loveitt (1874–1909), British rugby union player and Olympian

== See also ==
- Lovett (surname)
