= William Hand =

William Hand may refer to:

- William Hand (yacht designer) (1875–1946), yacht designer
- Black Hand (character), DC Comics character
- William Brevard Hand (1924–2008), U.S. federal judge
- Bill Hand (William R. Hand, 1898–?), English footballer

== See also ==
- William Hands, English cricketer
