= Wassell =

Wassell is a surname. Notable people with the surname include:

- Alan Wassell (born 1940), English cricketer
- Albert Wassell (1892–1975), English cricketer
- Corydon M. Wassell (1884–1958), United States Army physician
- Harold Wassell (1879–1951), English footballer
- Herbert Wassell Nadal (1873–1957), American minstrel show performer
- Kim Wassell (born 1957), English footballer
- Richard Wassell (1880–1949), English composer and organist
