= John Kendall =

John Kendall may refer to:

- John Kendall (MP for Bridgwater) (fl. 1467), see Bridgwater (UK Parliament constituency)
- John Kendall (MP) (1631 – at least 1702)
- John W. Kendall (1834–1892), American politician
- Jack Kendall (John William Kendall, 1905–1961), English football goalkeeper active in the 1920s and 1930s
- Jack Kendall (cricketer) (1921–2011), English cricketer
- John D. Kendall (1917–2011), American music pedagogue
- John Kendall (British Army officer)
- John Kendall (firefighter), fire chief and namesake of the John Kendall (fireboat)
- John Kendall (fireboat), commissioned 1930, decommissioned 1976, converted to a tugboat
