= Thomas Rhodes =

Thomas Rhodes may refer to:

- Thomas William Rhodes (1860–1944), New Zealand politician
- Thomas L. Rhodes, American political editor
- Thomas Rhodes (cricketer) (1874–1936), English cricketer
- Tom Rhodes (born 1967), American comedian
- Thomas Rhodes (MP) for Hastings
