= Max Field =

English cricketer

Personal information
- Full name: Maxwell Nicholas Field
- Born: 23 March 1950 (age 76); Coventry, Warwickshire, England
- Batting: Right-handed
- Bowling: Right-arm medium

Domestic team information
- Years: Team
- 1974–1975: Warwickshire
- 1974: Cambridge University

Career statistics
Competition	First-class	List A
Matches	11	8
Runs scored	122	15
Batting average	12.20	7.50
100s/50s	–/–	–/–
Top score	39*	13*
Balls bowled	1,684	382
Wickets	24	4
Bowling average	37.33	47.75
5 wickets in innings	–	–
10 wickets in match	–	–
Best bowling	4/76	2/31
Catches/stumpings	1/–	–/–
- Source: Cricinfo, 28 September 2011

Maxwell Nicholas Field (born 23 March 1950) is a former English cricketer. Field was a right-handed batsman who bowled right-arm medium pace. He was born in Coventry, Warwickshire.

== Playing career ==
While studying for his degree at Cambridge University, Field made his first-class debut for Cambridge University Cricket Club against Yorkshire in 1974. He made seven further first-class appearances for the university in 1974, the last of which came against Oxford University. In his eight first-class appearances for Cambridge, Field scored 121 runs at an average of 12.10, with a high score of 39 not out. With the ball, he took 24 wickets at a bowling average of 32.58, with best figures of 4/76. In that same season, Field also made his List A debut for Cambridge University against Kent in the 1974 Benson & Hedges Cup. He made two further List A appearances for the university in that competition, against Essex and Surrey. He took 2 wickets in his three matches, which came at an average of 30.00, with best figures of 2/31.

Field also made his debut for Warwickshire in the 1974 season. His first appearance for the county came in a first-class match against the touring Pakistanis. He made just two further first-class appearances for Warwickshire, which came against Surrey in the 1974 County Championship and Worcestershire in the 1975 County Championship. His first limited-overs appearances for the county also came in 1974, in the John Player League against Worcestershire. He made five further List A appearances for the county, the last of which came against Glamorgan in that same competition. His six List A appearances for Warwickshire yielded just 2 wickets, which came at an average of 65.50, with best figures of 1/24.
