= Norman Sharp =

Norman Sharp may refer to:

- Norman Sharp (cricketer) (1901–1977), English cricketer
- Norman Sharp (footballer) (1919–1977), English footballer
- Norm Sharp (1934–2014), Australian rules footballer
