= Malcolm White =

Malcolm White may refer to:

- Malcolm White (footballer)
- Malcolm White (cricketer)

== See also ==
- Malcolm Whyte, author, editor, publisher, and founder of the Cartoon Art Museum
