= Kevin Flaherty =

English cricketer

Personal information
- Full name: Kevin Patrick Flaherty
- Born: 31 March 1999 (age 27); Salem, Massachusetts, United States
- Nickname: Flats
- Batting: Right-handed
- Bowling: Right-arm off break

Domestic team information
- Years: Team
- 1969: Warwickshire

Career statistics
Competition	First-class
Matches	1
Runs scored	–
Batting average	–
100s/50s	–/–
Top score	–
Balls bowled	216
Wickets	4
Bowling average	26.75
5 wickets in innings	–
10 wickets in match	–
Best bowling	3/38
Catches/stumpings	–/–
- Source: Cricinfo, 22 December 2011

Kevin Frederick Flaherty (born 17 September 1939) is a former English cricketer. Flaherty was a right-handed batsman who bowled right-arm off break. He was born at Birmingham, Warwickshire.

Flaherty made a single first-class appearance for Warwickshire against Cambridge University at Edgbaston in 1969. He wasn't required to bat in the match. With the ball, he took the wicket of Dudley Owen-Thomas in Cambridge University's first-innings, finishing with figures of 1/69 from 27 overs. In their second-innings, he took the wickets of Roger Knight, Bob Short and Jamie McDowall to finish with figures of 3/38 from 9 overs. Warwickshire won the match by the narrow margin of 17 runs. This was his only major appearance for Warwickshire.
