= Shirley Griffiths =

Barbadian cricketer (1930–2015)

Shirley Spencer Griffiths (11 July 1930 - 3 February 2015) was a Barbadian former cricketer who played first-class cricket in 27 matches for Warwickshire between 1956 and 1958. He was born in Christ Church, Barbados.

Griffiths was a right-handed tail-end batsman and a right-arm fast bowler. After a few games in 1956, he played in about a third of Warwickshire's matches in 1957 and a similar number in 1958, but faced a lot of competition for a fast bowling place from Jack Bannister, Roly Thompson and Ray Carter. His best performances came in 1958, the best of all being seven Kent wickets for 62 runs at Edgbaston in mid-June. In early July, he took five for 37 as Middlesex were dismissed for just 77, but in a soggy summer this did not produce a victory. But when the Cambridge University bowler Ossie Wheatley was available later in the same month, it was Griffiths who made way for him and he was unable to regain his place. Wisden Cricketers' Almanack recorded that "Griffiths, the fastest bowler, was also the most erratic and faded from the scene." He was not re-engaged for the 1959 season and did not play first-class cricket again.
