= Robert Baynton =

English cricketer

Personal information
- Full name: Robert Geoffrey Baynton
- Born: 5 March 1900; Moseley, Birmingham, England
- Died: 26 September 1924 (aged 24); Moor Green, Birmingham
- Batting: Right-handed
- Bowling: Left-arm medium
- Role: All-rounder

Domestic team information
- Years: Team
- 1921–23: Warwickshire
- First-class debut: 25 June 1921 Warwickshire v Somerset
- Last First-class: 14 June 1923 Warwickshire v Surrey

Career statistics
| Competition | FC |
|---|---|
| Matches | 13 |
| Runs scored | 212 |
| Batting average | 11.77 |
| 100s/50s | –/– |
| Top score | 36 |
| Balls bowled | 1009 |
| Wickets | 14 |
| Bowling average | 34.21 |
| 5 wickets in innings | – |
| 10 wickets in match | – |
| Best bowling | 4/56 |
| Catches/stumpings | 3/– |
- Source: CricketArchive, 15 August 2015

Robert Geoffrey Baynton (5 March 1900 – 26 September 1924) was an English cricketer who played first-class cricket in 13 matches for Warwickshire between 1921 and 1923. He was born in Moseley, Birmingham and died in hospital following a road accident in King's Heath, also Birmingham, in which his brother Gerald was killed.

== Career ==
Baynton was the younger brother of the actor-manager Henry Baynton; he trained at Birmingham University as a dentist. In first-class cricket, he was a right-handed lower-order batsman and a left-arm medium pace bowler. After a couple of matches in 1921 for Warwickshire, he played fairly regularly in the second half of the 1922 season as an amateur, without making a decisive impact on any match. His best batting came in the game against Lancashire when he made his best score of 36, batting at No 9, and was top scorer in the Warwickshire first innings. His best bowling was four wickets for 56 runs in the game against Nottinghamshire in the same season. He played only once in the 1923 season and not at all thereafter.

== Death ==
Baynton died when a car driven by his older brother Gerald, a wireless equipment manufacturer, collided head-on with a tram in King's Heath. The inquest was told that the car was travelling at between 45 and 50 miles per hour and was equipped with strong headlights; no blame was attached to the tram driver. Gerald Baynton was killed instantly; Robert Baynton was taken to hospital with a fractured skull and died there. Other passengers in the car, including another Warwickshire cricketer, Frank Morter, were injured but survived. The inquest was told by Baynton's father that the car had formerly been used for racing and that the party had been visiting Baynton's sister. The inquest recorded a verdict of "accidental death".
