= Sam Bates =

Sam Bates may refer to:

- Sam Bates (rugby league) (born 1995), English rugby league footballer
- Sam Bates (cricketer) (born 1999), English cricketer
- Samantha Bates (born 1992), Australian cricketer

== See also ==
- Samuel Bates (disambiguation)
