= Barry Hands =

English cricketer

Personal information
- Full name: Barry Onslow Hands
- Born: 26 September 1916; Moseley, Warwickshire, England
- Died: 1 July 1984 (aged 67); Birmingham, Warwickshire, England
- Batting: Left-handed
- Bowling: Right-arm off break
- Relatives: William Hands (uncle)

Domestic team information
- Years: Team
- 1946–1947: Warwickshire

Career statistics
Competition	First-class
Matches	3
Runs scored	13
Batting average	6.50
100s/50s	–/–
Top score	9
Balls bowled	296
Wickets	4
Bowling average	34.25
5 wickets in innings	–
10 wickets in match	–
Best bowling	3/76
Catches/stumpings	–/–
- Source: Cricinfo, 30 December 2011

Barry Onslow Hands (26 September 1916 – 1 July 1984) was an English cricketer. Hands was a left-handed batsman who bowled right-arm off break. He was born at Moseley, Warwickshire.

Hands made his first-class debut for Warwickshire against Leicestershire at Kirkby Road, Barnwell in the 1946 County Championship. He made two further first-class appearances for the county in the 1947 County Championship against Glamorgan at St. Helen's, Swansea, and Hampshire at the County Ground, Southampton. In his three first-class matches, Hands took a total of 4 wickets at an average of 34.25, with best figures of 3/76. With the bat, he scored 13 runs at a batting average of 6.50, with a high score of 9.

He died at Birmingham, Warwickshire on 1 July 1984. His uncle, William Hands, also played first-class cricket for Warwickshire.
