= William Hampton (cricketer) =

English cricketer (1903–1964)

Cricket information
- Batting: Right-handed
- Bowling: Right-arm off-break

Career statistics
Competition	First-class
Matches	13
Runs scored	332
Batting average	13.83
100s/50s	0/2
Top score	57
Balls bowled	39
Wickets	1
Bowling average	26.00
5 wickets in innings	0
10 wickets in match	0
Best bowling	1/11
Catches/stumpings	8/–
- Source: CricInfo, 8 November 2022

William Marcus Hampton (20 January 1903 – 7 April 1964) was an English first-class cricketer who played in thirteen matches in the 1920s. He attended, and played for the XI at, Clifton College.

Born in Bromsgrove, Worcestershire, Hampton made his debut for Warwickshire against Northamptonshire in August 1922, making a useful 34 in the first innings. However, his next first-class appearances were not for three years, and were for Worcestershire. In his second match for his new county, against Warwickshire, Hampton made his highest score of 57 and took his only first-class wicket, that of Leonard Bates. However, Worcestershire lost by the little matter of 359 runs, which remained the county's second-worst defeat in terms of runs until 2001.

Hampton played a number of further matches for Worcestershire in 1925, hitting 55 against Hampshire in late July, but he was too often dismissed for small scores, being dismissed for single figures in 13 of his 22 innings. He made only one further first-class appearance, in July 1926, when he suffered the indignity of making a pair against Derbyshire.

Hampton later taught at Winchester College. He died in Fordingbridge, Hampshire at the age of 61.
