= Earl Harris (cricketer) =

Saint Kitts-born English cricketer (born 1952)

Personal information
- Full name: Earlston Joseph Harris
- Born: 3 November 1952 (age 74); Lodge Village, Saint Kitts
- Batting: Right-handed
- Bowling: Right-arm medium

Domestic team information
- Years: Team
- 1975: Warwickshire

Career statistics
Competition	First-class
Matches	4
Runs scored	26
Batting average	8.66
100s/50s	–/–
Top score	16
Balls bowled	426
Wickets	9
Bowling average	32.77
5 wickets in innings	–
10 wickets in match	–
Best bowling	3/66
Catches/stumpings	3/–
- Source: Cricinfo, 28 September 2011

Earlston Joseph Harris (born 3 November 1952) is a Saint Kitts born former English cricketer. Harris was a right-handed batsman who bowled right-arm medium pace. He was born in Lodge Village, Saint Kitts.

Harris made his first-class debut for Warwickshire against Oxford University in 1975. He made three further first-class appearances for the county in 1975, the last of which came against Kent in the County Championship. In his four first-class matches, he scored a total of 26 runs at an average of 8.66, with a high score of 16. With the ball, he took 9 wickets at a bowling average of 32.77, with best figures of 3/66.
