= Philip Bromley =

English cricketer

Personal information
- Full name: Philip Harry Bromley
- Born: 30 July 1930; Stratford-upon-Avon, Warwickshire, England
- Died: 21 February 2007 (aged 76); Warwick, England
- Batting: Right-handed
- Bowling: Right-arm off-break
- Role: Batsman

Domestic team information
- Years: Team
- 1947–56: Warwickshire
- First-class debut: 30 July 1947 Warwickshire v Scotland
- Last First-class: 4 May 1956 Warwickshire v Sussex

Career statistics
Competition	FC
Matches	49
Runs scored	1183
Batting average	21.50
100s/50s	1/6
Top score	121*
Balls bowled	2923
Wickets	35
Bowling average	36.11
5 wickets in innings	1
10 wickets in match	–
Best bowling	5/61
Catches/stumpings	37/–
- Source: CricketArchive, 16 August 2015

Philip Harry Bromley (30 July 1930 – 21 February 2007) was an English cricketer who played first-class cricket for Warwickshire between 1947 and 1956. He was born in Stratford-upon-Avon, Warwickshire and died at Warwick.

A right-handed lower-middle-order batsman, right-arm off-break bowler and a very occasional wicketkeeper, Bromley made his first-class debut on his 17th birthday in 1947 against Scotland and was 12 not out at the close of play, though he had failed to take a wicket when Scotland batted. He did not add to his score the following day, and then played only occasional matches for the first team, through to 1951, though he was a regular in the second eleven which competed in the Minor Counties competition from 1949.

From 1952 to 1954 he played in around half of Warwickshire's matches, though with a few exceptions he had limited impact with both bat and ball. Against Essex in 1952, he scored an unbeaten 121, but it was his only century and in the 1952 season as a whole his batting average was just 21.88. In the 1953 game with Worcestershire, he took five second innings wickets for 61 runs, his only return of five wickets in an innings; but in the very next match he was upstaged by the part-time off-breaks of Bert Wolton and was dropped from the team.

Bromley left regular cricket after the 1954 season, although he returned, without success, for a single match in 1956. He continued to play intermittently for Warwickshire's second team in the Minor Counties Championship and the Second Eleven Championship through to 1968.
