= Thomas Hilditch =

English cricketer

Personal information
- Full name: Thomas Arthur Hilditch
- Born: 10 January 1885; Sandbach, Cheshire, England
- Died: 7 August 1957 (aged 72); Bermuda, Warwickshire, England
- Batting: Right-handed
- Bowling: Right-arm fast-medium

Domestic team information
- Years: Team
- 1910: Cheshire
- 1907–1913: Warwickshire

Career statistics
Competition	First-class
Matches	8
Runs scored	42
Batting average	4.20
100s/50s	–/–
Top score	17
Balls bowled	511
Wickets	9
Bowling average	35.44
5 wickets in innings	–
10 wickets in match	–
Best bowling	3/41
Catches/stumpings	3/–
- Source: Cricinfo, 18 May 2012

Thomas Arthur Hilditch (10 January 1885 – 7 August 1957) was an English cricketer. Hilditch was a right-handed batsman who bowled right-arm fast-medium. He was born at Sandbach, Cheshire.

Hilditch made his first-class debut for Warwickshire against Northamptonshire in the 1907 County Championship. In that season and the one which followed, Hilditch made six first-class appearances for the county. In 1910, he appeared three times for his native Cheshire in the Minor Counties Championship, playing against the Nottinghamshire Second XI, the Yorkshire Second XI and Staffordshire. He next appeared in first-class cricket for Warwickshire in the 1912 County Championship against Leicestershire. He made a further first-class appearance in the 1913 County Championship against Gloucestershire. In his total of eight first-class appearances for the county, he took 9 wickets at an average of 35.44, with best figures of 3/41. With the bat, he scored 42 runs at a batting average of 4.20, with a high score of 17.

He died at Bermuda, Warwickshire, on 7 August 1957.
