= Alfred Hyde =

English cricketer

Personal information
- Full name: Alfred Joseph Hyde
- Born: 1884; England
- Died: Unknown
- Batting: Left-handed
- Bowling: Slow left-arm orthodox

Domestic team information
- Years: Team
- 1905–1907: Warwickshire

Career statistics
Competition	First-class
Matches	2
Runs scored	2
Batting average	–
100s/50s	–/–
Top score	2*
Balls bowled	156
Wickets	2
Bowling average	60.50
5 wickets in innings	–
10 wickets in match	–
Best bowling	1/22
Catches/stumpings	–/–
- Source: Cricinfo, 18 May 2012

Alfred Joseph Hyde (1884 – date of death unknown) was an English cricketer. Hyde was a left-handed batsman who bowled slow left-arm orthodox.

Hyde made two first-class appearances for Warwickshire, the first against Northamptonshire at the County Ground, Northampton, in the 1905 County Championship, and the second against Lancashire at Edgbaston in the 1907 County Championship. His first match against Northamptonshire saw the opposition winning the toss and electing to bat, with them being dismissed for 196 in that first-innings, with Hyde taking a single wicket, that of William Wells to finish with figures of 1/22 from seven overs. In response, Warwickshire made 125 all out, with him ending the innings not out on 3. He bowled just two overs in Northamptonshire's second-innings of 200 all out, going wicketless. The match ended in a draw. His second match against Lancashire saw the opposition win the toss and elect to bat, compiling 493/7 declared in that first-innings, with Hyde taking the wicket of the Les Poidevin to finish with figures of 1/87. Warwickshire reached 179/6 in their first-innings response, before weather conspired to ensure the match ended in a draw, with Hyde not having to bat in that only innings.
