= George Weldrick =

English cricketer

Personal information
- Full name: George Weldrick
- Born: 1 January 1882; Brighouse, Yorkshire, England
- Died: 14 April 1953 (aged 71); Brighouse, Yorkshire, England
- Batting: Right-handed

Domestic team information
- Years: Team
- 1906–1907: Warwickshire

Career statistics
Competition	First-class
Matches	8
Runs scored	53
Batting average	5.30
100s/50s	–/–
Top score	12
Balls bowled	–
Wickets	–
Bowling average	–
5 wickets in innings	–
10 wickets in match	–
Best bowling	–
Catches/stumpings	3/–
- Source: Cricinfo, 18 May 2012

George Weldrick (1 January 1882 – 14 April 1953) was an English cricketer. Weldrick was a right-handed batsman. He was born at Brighouse, Yorkshire.

Weldrick made his first-class debut for Warwickshire against Yorkshire in the 1906 County Championship. The following season he made seven further first-class appearances for the county, the last of which came against Leicestershire in the 1907 County Championship. He struggled with the bat in eight first-class appearances for the county, scoring 53 runs at an average of 5.30, with a high score of 12.

He died at the place of his birth on 14 April 1953.
