= Joseph Manton (cricketer) =

English cricketer

Personal information
- Full name: Joseph Manton
- Born: 4 December 1871; West Bromwich, Staffordshire, England
- Died: 9 December 1958 (aged 87); Henham, Essex, England
- Batting: Right-handed
- Bowling: Right-arm fast

Domestic team information
- Years: Team
- 1904: Staffordshire
- 1898: Warwickshire
- 1895: Bedfordshire

Career statistics
Competition	First-class
Matches	1
Runs scored	5
Batting average	2.50
100s/50s	–/–
Top score	5
Balls bowled	110
Wickets	1
Bowling average	51.00
5 wickets in innings	–
10 wickets in match	–
Best bowling	1/51
Catches/stumpings	–/–
- Source: Cricinfo, 22 March 2015

Joseph Manton (4 December 1871 – 9 December 1958) was an English cricketer active from 1895 to 1904. Born at West Bromwich, Staffordshire, he was a right-handed batsman and right-arm fast bowler, making a single appearance in first-class cricket.

Educated at King Edward's School, Birmingham, where he played for the school cricket team, Manton made his debut in county cricket for Bedfordshire in the 1895 Minor Counties Championship against Wiltshire at Trowbridge. He made seven further appearances for Bedfordshire, all coming in 1895. He later played a single first-class match for Warwickshire against Surrey in the 1898 County Championship at The Oval. He took one wicket in the match, dismissing Tom Hayward, and scored 5 runs. He later played in the 1904 Minor Counties Championship for Staffordshire, making four appearances.

He died at Henham, Essex on 9 December 1958.
