= Dennis Harris (alternative medicine) =

American physician

Dr. Dennis Howard Harris (born March, 1938, in Akron, Ohio) is a medical doctor known for selling alternative medicine remedies. Harris has developed and marketed several products, including one that was the subject of a 2003 Federal Trade Commission complaint resulting in an order essentially banning his company and its officers from making health claims not backed by scientific evidence.

== Biography ==
In 1963, Harris received his degree from Ohio State University College of Medicine. After residency-training in physical medicine and rehabilitation at Ohio State University and Southwestern Medical School, University of Texas, Harris moved to Scottsdale, Arizona, to begin private practice. In 1968, Harris established the Department of Physical Medicine and Rehabilitation at Scottsdale Memorial Hospital in 1968 and later established the Southwest Pain Control Program.

== Alternative medicine ==
Harris has been involved with several alternative medicine products and markets them nationally on radio commercials and infomercials.

Harris was the subject of a Federal Trade Commission complaint, closed on July 29, 2003 with an order essentially banning his company and its officers from making health claims not backed by scientific evidence. In the complaint the claims and actions of Harris, associates, and the company that produced and marketed the Dr Harris’ Original Snore Formula constituted "unfair or deceptive acts or practices", including the creation of "false advertisements", in violation of the Federal Trade Commission Act.
