= Reginald Scorer =

English cricketer

Reginald Ivor Scorer (6 January 1892 – 19 March 1976) was an English cricketer who played first-class cricket between 1921 and 1926 for Warwickshire. He was born in Middlesbrough, then in Yorkshire, and died in Birmingham.

Scorer was an amateur right-handed batsman and right-arm fast-medium bowler who played for Warwickshire's second eleven before the First World War. He began playing for Warwickshire's first eleven in June 1921 and then appeared in virtually all the matches to the end of that season, with occasional days of success as a lower middle-order batsman and a part-time bowler. Against Hampshire at Edgbaston, he made 113, his only century, in a game that also included Freddie Calthorpe's highest score. A month later, he finished off Somerset's first innings by taking the last three wickets in five overs for the cost of just a single run, and these were his best bowling figures.

Scorer returned for about half of Warwickshire's matches in 1922, but had less success, his highest score being just 35. He returned again briefly in 1926 for three games, with no success at all. He retained his links with cricket and during the Second World War was the organiser of festival cricket across the Midlands, which, according to his obituary in Wisden Cricketers' Almanack, led to him being the first person to speak over a public address system at a cricket match.
