= Alfred Barbery =

English cricketer

Personal information
- Full name: Alfred Edward Barbery
- Born: 13 October 1884; Marylebone, London, England
- Died: 23 May 1973 (aged 88); Solihull, Warwickshire, England
- Batting: Right-handed
- Bowling: Right-arm fast-medium

Domestic team information
- Years: Team
- 1906–1907: Warwickshire

Career statistics
Competition	First-class
Matches	2
Runs scored	13
Batting average	4.33
100s/50s	–/–
Top score	6
Balls bowled	356
Wickets	3
Bowling average	81.66
5 wickets in innings	–
10 wickets in match	–
Best bowling	2/64
Catches/stumpings	–/–
- Source: Cricinfo, 18 May 2012

Alfred Edward Barbery (13 October 1884 – 23 May 1973) was an English cricketer. Barbery was a right-handed batsman who bowled right-arm fast-medium. He was born at Marylebone, London.

Barbery made two first-class appearances for Warwickshire, the first against Surrey in the 1906 County Championship, and the second against the touring South Africans in 1907, with both matches played at Edgbaston. He had little success in his two first-class appearances, taking a total of 3 wickets at an average of 81.66, with best figures of 2/64, while with the bat, he scored 13 runs at a batting average of 4.33, with a high score of 6.

He died at Solihull, Warwickshire, on 23 May 1973.
