= Neville Bulpitt =

English cricketer

Personal information
- Full name: Neville John Bulpitt
- Born: 15 April 1957 (age 69); Coventry, Warwickshire, England
- Batting: Right-handed
- Bowling: Right-arm medium

Domestic team information
- Years: Team
- 1979: Warwickshire

Career statistics
Competition	List A
Matches	3
Runs scored	18
Batting average	9.00
100s/50s	–/–
Top score	11
Balls bowled	144
Wickets	2
Bowling average	53.50
5 wickets in innings	–
10 wickets in match	–
Best bowling	1/31
Catches/stumpings	–/–
- Source: Cricinfo, 11 October 2015

Neville John Bulpitt (born 15 April 1957) is a former English cricketer who was active in one-day cricket in 1979. He played as a right-handed batsman and right-arm medium pace bowler.

Bulpitt had played second XI cricket since 1975, but it wasn't until 1979 that he made his debut for Warwickshire in a List A (one-day) match against Leicestershire in the John Player League at Edgbaston. He would play two further List A matches in that tournament, against Gloucestershire at Moreton-in-Marsh, and Yorkshire at Edgbaston. He scored a total of 18 runs in his three List A matches, with a best score of 11. He took 2 wickets with the ball, with best figures of 1/31. He did not make any appearances in first-class cricket for Warwickshire.
