= Warwick Tidy =

English cricketer

Warwick Nigel Tidy (born 10 February 1953) is a former English cricketer. A right-handed batsman who bowled leg breaks and googlies, he played first-class cricket on 36 occasions for Warwickshire between 1970 and 1974, taking 81 wickets at 34.25 with a best of 5 for 24. He played just one List A match against Middlesex in the 1970 John Player League.

Born in Birmingham, Tidy moved to South West England in 1978 (having played club cricket for Sutton Coldfield) and played club cricket for Plymouth Cricket Club in the "A" Division of the Devon Cricket League between 1979 and 1987.
