= Nathan Newport =

English cricketer

Nathan Alexander Newport (born 10 May 1989) is an English cricketer who played first-class cricket in a single match for Warwickshire in 2009. He was born in Worcester, and is the son of the England and Worcestershire cricketer Phil Newport.

Newport is a left-handed opening batsman and a right-arm medium-pace bowler. He played second eleven cricket for Warwickshire from 2008 to 2010 and for Leicestershire in 2011. His only appearance in first-class cricket came as a stand-in for Jonathan Trott in the County Championship match against Somerset in 2009, when Trott was called up to the England Test team but then not selected for the actual Test match; Newport stood down when Trott returned to Warwickshire and neither batted nor bowled. He has played for several years in the Birmingham and District Premier League.
