= Edwin Kirk =

English cricketer

Personal information
- Full name: Edwin Kirk
- Born: 6 May 1866; Coventry, Warwickshire, England
- Died: 8 April 1957 (aged 90); Coventry, Warwickshire, England
- Batting: Right-handed

Domestic team information
- Years: Team
- 1898: Warwickshire

Career statistics
Competition	First-class
Matches	1
Runs scored	0
Batting average	0.00
100s/50s	–/–
Top score	0
Balls bowled	–
Wickets	–
Bowling average	–
5 wickets in innings	–
10 wickets in match	–
Best bowling	–
Catches/stumpings	1/–
- Source: Cricinfo, 15 July 2012

Edwin Kirk (6 May 1866 – 8 April 1957) was an English cricketer. Kirk was a right-handed batsman. He was born at Coventry, Warwickshire.

Nelson made a single first-class appearance for Warwickshire against Derbyshire in the 1898 County Championship at Edgbaston. Derbyshire won the toss and elected to bat first, making 266 all out, to which Warwickshire responded to in their first-innings by making 485/8 declared, during which Kirk was dismissed for a duck by Joseph Hancock. Derbyshire then reached 161/3 in their second-innings, at which point the match was declared a draw. This was his only major appearance for Warwickshire.

He died at the city of his birth on 8 April 1957.
