= Ian Clifford =

English cricketer

Personal information
- Full name: Jeffrey Ian Clifford
- Born: 12 October 1982 (age 44); Birmingham, Warwickshire, England
- Batting: Right-handed
- Role: Wicketkeeper

Domestic team information
- Years: Team
- 2001-2002: Warwickshire Cricket Board
- 2002 & 2004: Warwickshire

Career statistics
Competition	FC	LA
Matches	4	6
Runs scored	20	13
Batting average	3.33	4.33
100s/50s	–/–	–/–
Top score	7	5*
Balls bowled	–	60
Wickets	–	1
Bowling average	–	33.00
5 wickets in innings	–	–
10 wickets in match	–	–
Best bowling	–	–
Catches/stumpings	15/1	10/1
- Source: Cricinfo, 25 October 2010

Jeffrey Ian Clifford (born 12 October 1982) is a former English cricketer. Clifford was a right-handed batsman who played primarily as a wicketkeeper. He was born at Birmingham, Warwickshire.

Clifford made his debut in List A cricket for the Warwickshire Cricket Board against the Leicestershire Cricket Board in the 2001 Cheltenham & Gloucester Trophy. His second and final List A appearance for the Board came against Leicestershire in the 2002 Cheltenham & Gloucester Trophy.

Clifford made his debut in first-class cricket for Warwickshire against Somerset in 2002. During 2002, he represented the county in 4 first-class matches, the last of which came against Somerset in the County Championship. In his 4 first-class matches, he scored 20 runs at a batting average of 3.33, with a high score of 7. Behind the stumps he took 15 catches and made a single stumping.

Clifford also played List A matches for Warwickshire. His List A debut for the county came against Yorkshire in 2002. He played 3 List A matches for Warwickshire in 2002, but played his final match for the county in 2004 against Hampshire. In his total of 6 career List A matches, he scored 13 runs at an average of 4.33, with a high score of 5*. Behind the stumps he took 10 catches and made a single stumping.
