= Colin Langley =

English cricketer

Colin Kendall Langley (11 July 1888 – 26 June 1948) was an English cricketer who played first-class cricket for Warwickshire between 1908 and 1914. He was born at Narborough House, Narborough, Leicestershire and died at Hatton, Warwickshire.

Langley was educated at Radley College and at Oxford University, though he did not play any important cricket at Oxford. As a cricketer he was a right-handed lower-order batsman and a right-arm fast-medium bowler whose action was described in one report as "somewhat awkward". He played for Warwickshire in a few matches in each of the 1908, 1909 and 1910 seasons, but did not appear at all in 1911, when the team unexpectedly won the County Championship. He played more regularly in the three seasons leading up to the First World War and had occasional days of triumph: against Worcestershire in 1912, he took eight first innings wickets for just 29 runs, the best bowling of his career. A combination of a wet summer and a marked reluctance to bowl him meant that Langley bowled only 70 overs across his eight matches in 1912, but these figures propelled him towards the top of the national bowling averages, as his 19 wickets in the season cost just 197 runs. He bowled more but was more expensive in 1913, when his returns included five for 48 in the game against Hampshire, a match where he also captained the Warwickshire side. He bowled hardly at all in 1914, taking only six wickets in nine first-class matches but in this season his batting, usually negligible, had its only good game, with an innings of 61 not out against Middlesex.

At the outbreak of the First World War, Langley joined the Honourable Artillery Company as a private; he was reported as having been "wounded in action" in Flanders in June 1915. At the start of 1916, he accepted a commission in the 15th Battalion of the Royal Warwickshire Regiment, one of the Birmingham Pals battalions. A newspaper report in May 1916 stated that he had been wounded in action again.

The war wounds meant that Langley was unable to return to county cricket after 1919; he played for Leamington Cricket Club and also involved himself in the administration of the Warwickshire county club, acting as legal adviser, later chairman, and then from 1939 as honorary secretary. He qualified as a solicitor and was the senior partner of the Birmingham company of Colin Langley & Smith; he also involved himself in the trade associations representing brewers and the licensed trade. According to Bill Furmedge of Wisdenworld (www.wisdenworld.com), "In his Will Langley bequeathed his full set of Wisden Cricketers' Almanacks to Warwickshire County Cricket Club. They were greatly enjoyed by many thousands of members until 2016 when the set, minus some of the rarer editions, was sold. Each Wisden has a printed annotation explaining Langleys' bequeathal."
