= William Clarkson (cricketer) =

English cricketer

William Clarkson (21 August 1899 – date of death unknown) was an English cricketer who played first-class cricket in two matches for Warwickshire, one in 1922 and the other in 1923. He was born in Hindley, Lancashire; the place and date of his death are not known.

Clarkson played as a lower order left-handed batsman and a left-arm medium pace bowler. He played for Warwickshire's second eleven and for the Warwickshire Club and Ground team in both 1922 and 1923, but the second eleven did not play any competitive matches at this time. Against Cambridge University he scored 17 and 0 and failed to take a wicket; against the 1923 West Indian team he made 41 and 1 and took the only two wickets of his first-class career.
