= Edward Matheson =

English cricketer

Edward Matheson (14 June 1865 – 26 February 1945) was an English cricketer who played first-class cricket in single matches for the South of England cricket team in 1886 and for Warwickshire in 1899. He was born at Charlton, Dover, Kent and died at Uffculme, Devon.

Matheson was the son of Reverend Charles Matheson, headmaster of the Clergy Orphan School in Canterbury; he was educated at Trinity College, Cambridge, but he did not play in any senior cricket matches while at Cambridge University. He graduated with a Bachelor of Arts degree in 1886 and at the end of the cricket season for that year, he played in a single first-class cricket match for a team representing the South against the Australians, scoring 1 and 6. He did little better in his only other match, a County Championship game for Warwickshire against Gloucestershire in 1899, in which he scored 9 and 5.

Matheson was a schoolmaster and was on the teaching staff at Summer Fields School in St Leonards-on-Sea, East Sussex.
