= Simon Green (cricketer) =

English cricketer

Personal information
- Full name: Simon James Green
- Born: 19 March 1970 (age 56); Bloxwich, Staffordshire, England
- Batting: Right-handed
- Bowling: Left-arm medium

Domestic team information
- Years: Team
- 1988–1991: Warwickshire

Career statistics
Competition	First-class	List A
Matches	5	9
Runs scored	168	44
Batting average	24.00	6.28
100s/50s	–/1	–/–
Top score	77*	25
Balls bowled	–	–
Wickets	–	–
Bowling average	–	–
5 wickets in innings	–	–
10 wickets in match	–	–
Best bowling	–	–
Catches/stumpings	2/–	–/–
- Source: Cricinfo, 28 September 2011

Simon James Green (born 19 March 1970) is a former English cricketer. Green was a right-handed batsman who bowled left-arm medium pace. He was born in Bloxwich, Staffordshire.

Green made his first-class debut for Warwickshire against Lancashire in 1988 County Championship. He made just four further first-class appearances for the county, the last of which came against Somerset in the 1991 County Championship. In his five first-class matches, he scored a total of 168 runs at an average of 24.00, with a highest score of 77 not out. This score, which was his only first-class fifty, came against Somerset in 1991. His List A debut came in the 1988 Refuge Assurance League against Kent. Green made eight further List A appearances, the last of which came against Lancashire in the 1991 Refuge Assurance League. In his nine List A matches, he scored a total of 44 runs at an average of 6.28, with a high score of 25.
