= Arthur Fabling =

English cricketer

Personal information
- Full name: Arthur Hugh Fabling
- Born: 6 September 1889; Grandborough, Warwickshire, England
- Died: 13 October 1972 (aged 83); Grandborough, Warwickshire, England
- Batting: Right-handed
- Role: Occasional wicket-keeper

Domestic team information
- Years: Team
- 1921: Warwickshire

Career statistics
Competition	First-class
Matches	1
Runs scored	8
Batting average	4.00
100s/50s	–/–
Top score	7
Balls bowled	–
Wickets	–
Bowling average	–
5 wickets in innings	–
10 wickets in match	–
Best bowling	–
Catches/stumpings	–/–
- Source: Cricinfo, 30 December 2011

(Arthur) Hugh Fabling (6 September 1889 – 13 October 1972) was an English farmer who participated in a first-class cricket match in 1921 for Warwickshire as a right-handed batsman and wicket-keeper.

== Early life ==
Fabling was born at Grandborough, Warwickshire, son of Arthur Fabling, a farmer, life member of the Royal Agricultural Society of England, and breeder of shire horses, who in 1894 was noted to have "hunted for a good many seasons with the Warwickshire and Pytchley", it being further observed of him ("a first-class performer") that "there is no better horseman".

== Cricket career ==
Fabling made a single first-class appearance for Warwickshire against Northamptonshire at the County Ground, Northampton, in the 1921 County Championship. Fabling was dismissed for a single run in Warwickshire's first-innings of 243 by William Wells, with Northamptonshire replying by making just 77 in their first-innings. Warwickshire made 268 in their second-innings, with Fabling being dismissed again by Wells, this time for 7 runs. Northamptonshire were set a victory target of 435 to win, but could only manage to make 266 all out, giving Warwickshire a 168 runs victory. This was his only major appearance for Warwickshire. He also played association football for Northampton.

== Other endeavours ==
Fabling farmed at Grandborough, first when resident at Moat House, then at Castle Farm. He served in the Royal Buckinghamshire Hussars as a second lieutenant during the First World War.

== Personal life ==
Fabling married Ellen Rhona (1900-1986), daughter of farmer Arthur Henry Pearce, of Stratford-upon-Avon, JP. They had twin sons; Desmond (1922-1974), who became a Major in the Royal Dragoons and served with the 14th Prince of Wales's Own Scinde Horse in India, married Fiona, granddaughter of Angus Campbell-Gray, 22nd Lord Gray. Fabling died 13 October 1972 at his home, Castle Farm, in the village of his birth.
