= Andrew Speed =

Scottish-born county cricketer

Personal information
- Full name: Andrew Watson Speed
- Born: 19 January 1899; Glasgow, Lanarkshire, Scotland
- Died: 17 July 1990 (aged 91); Bromsgrove, Worcestershire
- Batting: Right-handed
- Bowling: Right-arm fast-medium
- Role: Bowler

Domestic team information
- Years: Team
- 1927–1928: Warwickshire
- FC debut: 6 August 1927 Warwickshire v Worcestershire
- Last FC: 4 August 1928 Warwickshire CCC v Derbyshire

Career statistics
Competition	First-class
Matches	8
Runs scored	29
Batting average	7.25
100s/50s	0/0
Top score	11*
Balls bowled	1,177
Wickets	29
Bowling average	18.55
5 wickets in innings	2
10 wickets in match	0
Best bowling	6/81
Catches/stumpings	1/–
- Source: CricketArchive, 1 July 2013

Andrew Watson Speed (19 January 1899 – 17 July 1990) was a Scottish-born county cricketer who played first-class cricket for Warwickshire across the 1927 and 1928 seasons as a right-arm fast-medium bowler. After playing for West of Scotland Cricket Club in 1921, during which time he turned out against a touring Australian cricket team, Speed joined Warwickshire in 1927. He made eight first-class appearances, taking 29 wickets, before his career came abruptly to an end despite several career-best performances in his final matches.

In his short first-class career, he maintained a healthy bowling average of 18.55. He finished the remainder of his cricketing days playing for Moseley and Warwickshire Imps cricket clubs.

== Career ==
Speed was born on 19 January 1899 in Glasgow. A right-arm fast-medium bowler and tail-end right-handed batsman, in his early twenties Speed played for West of Scotland Cricket Club. On 9 July 1921 he faced the Australian team who were touring England and Scotland that summer. Speed took 3/111 – dismissing Jack Ryder, Warwick Armstrong and Edgar Mayne – and scored one and ten runs batting eleventh and then as nightwatchman in the second innings, as West of Scotland were forced to follow on. They managed to salvage a draw.

Speed moved to England, joining Warwickshire in 1927. He made his first-class debut at the New Road Cricket Ground in Worcester on 6 August 1927. After being run out for three, he took 4/75 in a rain-affected two-day game. He then travelled with the team to Portsmouth to face Hampshire on 27 August, making eight and a duck yet taking 4/63 and 1/12 though Hampshire took a commanding nine-wicket victory.

Speed did not play for the remainder of the 1927 season, however he rejoined Warwickshire in May 1928. On 5 May he faced Glamorgan at Edgbaston, taking 1/23 in the first innings though he went wicketless in the second. He also made his career best with the bat: 11 while batting last. Warwickshire controlled the match and won by ten wickets. Then on 19 May Speed travelled north to face Lancashire, but injury prevented him from taking the field at any point during the game.

On 4 July, Speed returning to the field against Northamptonshire at Kettering, taking 2/50. This was followed on 14 July by his maiden five-wicket haul: 5/39 against a West Indies cricket team who were in England for their summer tour. Speed's five-for included the wickets of Clifford Roach, Maurice Fernandes, Joe Small, Teddy Hoad and Herman Griffith. Speed then went on to take four more wickets in the second innings, including Fernandes and Small for the second time and adding Learie Constantine and George Challenor. His final match figures were 9/109.

Despite this success – though the West Indians toured a weak team that summer, suffering heavy defeats across the country – Speed would only play two more matches for his county. On 28 July he faced Glamorgan once more, taking his career-best 6/81 in the first innings. His final appearance came at Edgbaston once more, against Derbyshire, where he took a wicket-apiece in each innings.

Speed did not play County Cricket again, however he enjoyed a four-year career for both the Warwickshire Imps and Moseley cricket clubs, two clubs which still exist today. Speed played for both clubs between June 1930 and June 1934, during which time Moseley competed in the Birmingham and District League for club cricket. He died in 1990 in Bromsgrove, aged 91 years.
