= Reginald Franklin =

English cricketer

Personal information
- Full name: Reginald Carey Franklin
- Born: 30 April 1880; Radford, Warwickshire, England
- Died: 25 June 1957 (aged 77); Saltdean, Sussex, England
- Batting: Right-handed
- Bowling: Leg break

Domestic team information
- Years: Team
- 1900: Warwickshire

Career statistics
Competition	First-class
Matches	1
Runs scored	0
Batting average	0.00
100s/50s	–/–
Top score	0
Balls bowled	–
Wickets	–
Bowling average	–
5 wickets in innings	–
10 wickets in match	–
Best bowling	–
Catches/stumpings	1/–
- Source: Cricinfo, 16 May 2012

Reginald Carey Franklin (30 April 1880 – 25 June 1957) was an English cricketer. Franklin was a right-handed batsman who bowled leg break. He was born at Radford, Warwickshire, and was educated at Repton School.

Franklin made a single first-class appearance for Warwickshire against Derbyshire at North Road Ground, Glossop in the 1900 County Championship. Warwickshire won the toss and elected to bat, making 118 all out. Franklin, who captained Warwickshire in what was his only appearance in first-class cricket, was dismissed for a duck by Billy Bestwick. In a match heavily affected by rain, Derbyshire reached 67/5 before the match was declared a draw.

He died at Saltdean, Sussex, on 25 June 1957.
