= Vincent Brewster =

Barbadian-born English cricketer

Personal information
- Full name: Vincent Crescedo Brewster
- Born: 2 January 1940 (age 86); Bridgetown, Saint Michael, Barbados
- Batting: Left-handed
- Bowling: Slow left-arm orthodox

Domestic team information
- Years: Team
- 1965: Warwickshire

Career statistics
Competition	First-class
Matches	2
Runs scored	58
Batting average	19.33
100s/50s	–/–
Top score	35*
Balls bowled	429
Wickets	10
Bowling average	17.50
5 wickets in innings	1
10 wickets in match	–
Best bowling	7/58
Catches/stumpings	1/–
- Source: Cricinfo, 12 May 2012

Vincent Crescedo Brewster (born 2 January 1940) is a Barbadian cricketer. Brewster was a left-handed batsman who bowled slow left-arm orthodox. He was born at Bridgetown in the parish of Saint Michael.

Brewster made two first-class appearances for Warwickshire in English county cricket in 1965, against Oxford University and the touring South Africans. Against Oxford University, Warwickshire won the toss and elected to bat, making 195 all out, during which Brewster was dismissed for a single run by Ted Fillary. Oxford University responded in their first-innings with 211 all out, with Brewster taking figures of 7/58 from 37.5 overs. In their second-innings, Warwickshire made 261/7 declared, with Brewster ending the innings not out on 35. Chasing 246 for victory, Oxford University were bowled out in their second-innings for 224, with Brewster taking two wickets, contributing to a 21 run victory for the county. In his second match against the touring South Africans, Warwickshire once again won the toss and elected to bat, making 217/7 declared, with Brewster scoring 19 runs before he was dismissed by Norman Crookes. The South Africans declared their first-innings on 208/4, with Brewster taking a single wicket in the innings, that of Dennis Gamsy. Warwickshire declared their second-innings on 170/9, with Brewster making 3 runs before he was dismissed for the same bowler. The match ended in a draw.
