= Michael Edmond =

English cricketer

Personal information
- Full name: Michael Denis Edmond
- Born: 30 July 1969 (age 57); Barrow-in-Furness, Lancashire, England
- Batting: Right-handed
- Bowling: Right-arm medium

Domestic team information
- Years: Team
- 1996–1999: Warwickshire

Career statistics
Competition	First-class	List A
Matches	8	11
Runs scored	138	58
Batting average	19.71	14.50
100s/50s	–/–	–/–
Top score	32	19
Balls bowled	695	371
Wickets	7	14
Bowling average	53.14	19.57
5 wickets in innings	–	–
10 wickets in match	–	–
Best bowling	2/26	2/4
Catches/stumpings	2/–	2/–
- Source: Cricinfo, 12 May 2012

Michael Denis Edmond (born 30 July 1969) is a former English cricketer. Edmond was a right-handed batsman who bowled right-arm medium pace. He was born at Barrow-in-Furness, Lancashire.

Edmond made his first-class debut for Warwickshire against Middlesex in the 1996 County Championship. He made seven further first-class appearances for the county, the last of which came against Oxford University in 1999. In his total of eight first-class matches, he scored 138 runs at an average of 19.71, with a high score of 32. With the ball, he took 7 wickets at a bowling average of 53.14, with best figures of 2/26. He also made his List A debut in his debut season against Yorkshire in the 1996 AXA Equity & Law League. He made ten further List A appearances, the last of which came against Gloucestershire in the 1999 CGU National League. In his eleven List A matches, he scored a total of 58 runs at an average of 14.50, with a high score of 19. With the ball, he took 14 wickets at a bowling average of 19.57, with best figures of 2/4.
