= Richard Mead-Briggs =

English cricketer

Personal information
- Full name: Richard Mead-Briggs
- Born: 25 March 1902; Canterbury, Kent, England
- Died: 15 May 1956 (aged 54); Harborne, Warwickshire, England
- Batting: Right-handed
- Bowling: Right-arm medium-fast

Domestic team information
- Years: Team
- 1946: Warwickshire

Career statistics
Competition	First-class
Matches	2
Runs scored	46
Batting average	46.00
100s/50s	–/–
Top score	44*
Balls bowled	240
Wickets	1
Bowling average	96.00
5 wickets in innings	–
10 wickets in match	–
Best bowling	1/44
Catches/stumpings	3/–
- Source: Cricinfo, 23 December 2011

Richard Mead-Briggs (25 March 1902 – 15 May 1956) was an English cricketer. Mead-Briggs was a right-handed batsman who bowled right-arm medium-fast. He was born at Canterbury, Kent.

Mead-Briggs made two first-class appearances for Warwickshire against Sussex and Leicestershire in the 1946 County Championship. Against Sussex, Mead-Briggs bowled 14 wicketless overs in Sussex's first-innings total of 224. He was dismissed for 2 runs in Warwickshire's first-innings of 237 by Edward Harrison. The match ended in a draw. Against Leicestershire, he ended not out on 44 in Warwickshire's first-innings total of 368, while in Leicestershire's first-innings he took what would be his only first-class wicket when he dismissed Vic Jackson, finishing with figures of 1/44 from 21 overs. He wasn't required to bat in Warwickshire's second-innings and in Leicestershire's second-innings he bowled 5 wicketless overs, with Warwickshire winning by 229 runs. These were his only major appearances for Warwickshire.

He died at Harborne, Warwickshire on 15 May 1956.
