= Conrad Davies =

English cricketer

Conrad Stephen Suckling Davies, known as "Con Davies", (27 June 1907 – 10 May 1995) was an English first-class cricketer who played in eight matches for Warwickshire between 1930 and 1936. He was born in Edgbaston, Birmingham and died in Hackney, London.

Davies had a 50-years-long career as a club cricketer for Alexandra Park Cricket Club in North London and was reckoned in his obituary in Wisden Cricketers' Almanack to have made 64,000 runs, including 126 centuries, as a right-handed middle-order batsman and to have taken more than 5,000 wickets with left-arm orthodox spin. He became president of the Club Cricket Conference, the organisation for amateur cricket clubs.

His first-class career was limited and was for the county of his birth, Warwickshire, with eight matches in four different seasons dotted across seven years. He took a few wickets in each of his first-class games, though never more than three in any single one; his batting flourished only once, when he made 63 and shared a fifth-wicket partnership of 168 with Reg Santall in the game against Kent in 1933.
