= Michael Balac =

English cricketer (born 1988)

Personal information
- Full name: Michael Balac
- Born: 3 August 1988 (age 38); Nuneaton, Warwickshire, England
- Batting: Right-handed
- Role: Wicket-keeper

Domestic team information
- Years: Team
- 2008: Warwickshire

Career statistics
Competition	First-class
Matches	1
Runs scored	11
Batting average	11.00
100s/50s	0/0
Top score	11
Catches/stumpings	6/–
- Source: Cricinfo, 4 January 2020

Michael Balac (born 3 August 1988) is an English former first-class cricketer. He is a right-handed batsman and wicket-keeper who played once for Warwickshire County Cricket Club. He was born in Nuneaton.

Balac's cricketing career started in the Cockspur Cup, representing Leamington between 2005 and 2007. Having made a Second XI appearance for Warwickshire in 2008, he made his debut first-class appearance against Bangladesh A in July having been registered especially as a player with the England and Wales Cricket Board to replace the rested Tony Frost and injured Richard Johnson, Warwickshire's two professional wicket-keepers at the time. He took two catches in the first innings and four in the second innings.
