= Alfred Woodroffe =

English cricketer

Personal information
- Full name: Alfred Woodroffe
- Born: 1 September 1918; West Bromwich, Staffordshire, England
- Died: 23 July 1964 (aged 45); Sutton Coldfield, Warwickshire, England
- Batting: Left-handed

Domestic team information
- Years: Team
- 1947–1948: Warwickshire

Career statistics
Competition	First-class
Matches	4
Runs scored	77
Batting average	11.00
100s/50s	–/–
Top score	41
Balls bowled	–
Wickets	–
Bowling average	–
5 wickets in innings	–
10 wickets in match	–
Best bowling	–
Catches/stumpings	3/–
- Source: Cricinfo, 11 October 2015

Alfred Woodroffe (1 September 1918 – 23 July 1964) was an English cricketer active in first-class cricket from 1947–1948. He played as a left-handed batsman.

Woodroffe made his debut in first-class cricket for Warwickshire against Worcestershire in the 1947 County Championship at Dudley. He made a further appearance in 1947 against Gloucestershire, before making his final two first-class appearances in the 1948 County Championship against Gloucestershire and Surrey. As a middle order batsman, Woodroffe scored a total of 77 runs in his four matches, with a high score of 41.

He died at Sutton Coldfield, Warwickshire on 23 July 1964.
