= Charles Taylor (cricketer, born 1881) =

English cricketer

Personal information
- Full name: Charles James Taylor
- Born: 8 June 1881; Bedminster, Bristol, England
- Died: 25 August 1960 (aged 79); Leek, Staffordshire, England
- Batting: Right-handed
- Bowling: Right-arm fast-medium
- Relatives: Frederick Taylor (son)

Domestic team information
- Years: Team
- 1908–1909: Warwickshire
- 1910–1911: Somerset
- 1921–1932: Staffordshire

Career statistics
Competition	First-class
Matches	21
Runs scored	226
Batting average	6.84
100s/50s	0/0
Top score	33
Balls bowled	3,131
Wickets	61
Bowling average	32.14
5 wickets in innings	2
10 wickets in match	0
Best bowling	6/82
Catches/stumpings	9/–
- Source: CricketArchive, 25 December 2016

Charles James Taylor (8 June 1881 – 25 August 1960) was an English cricketer active in the latter half of the first decade of the 1900s, later playing intermittently through the 1920s to the early 1930s. Born at Bedminster, Bristol, Taylor was a right-handed batsman and right-arm fast-medium bowler who made 21 appearances in first-class cricket, though was mostly associated with minor counties cricket.

Taylor made his debut in first-class cricket for Warwickshire against Hampshire in the 1908 County Championship. He made two further first-class appearances for Warwickshire in the 1909 County Championship against Yorkshire and Derbyshire. He then played eighteen times for Somerset in 1910 and 1911. In all, he collected 61 first-class wickets, with his best performance being 6/82. He began playing minor counties cricket for Staffordshire in 1921, playing intermittently in the Minor Counties Championship for the next decade, with fifteen appearances up to 1932. His best match figures for Staffordshire came in 1931 against Denbighshire, when he took 12/72 in the match.

He died at Leek, Staffordshire on 25 August 1960. His son Frederick Taylor also played first-class cricket.
