= Norman Shortland =

English cricketer (1916–1951)

Personal information
- Full name: Norman Arthur Shortland
- Born: 6 July 1916; Coventry, Warwickshire, England
- Died: 14 March 1973 (aged 56); Finham, Warwickshire, England
- Batting: Right-handed
- Bowling: Right-arm medium

Domestic team information
- Years: Team
- 1938–1950: Warwickshire

Career statistics
Competition	First-class
Matches	23
Runs scored	487
Batting average	13.91
100s/50s	–/2
Top score	70
Balls bowled	102
Wickets	–
Bowling average	–
5 wickets in innings	–
10 wickets in match	–
Best bowling	–
Catches/stumpings	2/–
- Source: Cricinfo, 24 October 2015

Norman Arthur Shortland (6 July 1916 – 15 January 1951) was an English cricketer active in first-class cricket from 1938–1950 for Warwickshire. He played as a right-handed batsman and right-arm medium pace bowler.

Born at Coventry, Shortland was educated in his home city at Stoke School, where he captained the school cricket team. He made his debut in first-class cricket for Warwickshire in the 1938 County Championship against Glamorgan at Edgbaston. He made a further appearance in 1939 against Worcestershire, before making seven first-class appearances in 1939. During the Second World War he served in the Eighth Army as a Staff Captain. Following the war he returned to playing first-class cricket for Warwickshire, earning his county cap in 1946, in which season he made ten first-class appearances. He would not play first-class cricket again for Warwickshire until 1949, when he made two appearances in that season's County Championship, before making his final two appearances in first-class cricket against Essex and Lancashire in 1950. In 23 first-class matches he scored a total of 487 runs, averaging 13.91, with a high score of 70, which he made against Sussex in 1946.

Outside of cricket, Shortland worked in the transport industry, first for Mortons (BRS) Ltd, who he joined as an office boy in 1934, before rising to the position of company chairman. Following his retirement from that post due to ill health (he suffered a heart attack in 1970), he became a director at Wyndon Motors (Coventry) Ltd, a vehicle repair shop. In the winter months he played rugby for Nuneaton R.F.C., and in his youth he had played at schoolboy level for England in 1931. He became a director of Coventry City in 1971, joining the club's board on the same day as Sir Jack Scamp. He died at Finham, Warwickshire on 14 March 1973.
