= Archibald Harris =

English cricketer

Personal information
- Full name: Archibald John Harris
- Born: 22 December 1892; Rugby, Warwickshire, England
- Died: 10 April 1955 (aged 62); Lymington, Hampshire, England
- Batting: Right-handed
- Relatives: William Harris (brother)

Domestic team information
- Years: Team
- 1919: Warwickshire

Career statistics
Competition	First-class
Matches	1
Runs scored	18
Batting average	9.00
100s/50s	–/–
Top score	14
Balls bowled	–
Wickets	–
Bowling average	–
5 wickets in innings	–
10 wickets in match	–
Best bowling	–
Catches/stumpings	1/–
- Source: Cricinfo, 21 October 2012

Archibald John Harris (22 December 1892 – 10 April 1955) was an English cricketer. Harris was a right-handed batsman born in Rugby, Warwickshire.

Harris made a single first-class appearance for Warwickshire against Worcestershire in 1919 at New Road, Worcester. Worcestershire won the toss and elected to bat first, making 187 all out. In response, Warwickshire were dismissed in their first-innings for 145, with Harris dismissed for 4 runs by William Taylor. Worcestershire then made 102/7 declared in their second-innings, leaving Warwickshire with a target of 145 for victory. Harris opened the innings in Warwickshire's chase alongside Frederick Santall, scoring 14 runs before he was dismissed by Robert Burrows. Warwickshire reached their target for the loss of two wickets. This was his only major appearance for the county.

Harris died at Lymington, Hampshire, on 10 April 1955. His brother, William, also played first-class cricket.
