= Terry Barnes (Warwickshire cricketer) =

English cricketer

Terry Peter Barnes (born 13 November 1933) is a former cricketer who played first-class cricket in a single match for Warwickshire in 1956. He was born at Radford, Coventry, then in Warwickshire.

Barnes was a lower-order right-handed batsman and a wicketkeeper, and was the second eleven wicketkeeper playing regular Minor Counties cricket for Warwickshire in the 1955 and 1956 seasons. With Dick Spooner as regular wicketkeeper in the first team, Barnes was given only a single first-class game, the match against Scotland in 1956, in which he made seven runs and took one catch.
