= William Harris (cricketer, born 1883) =

English cricketer

William Henry Harris (30 December 1883 – 14 October 1967) was an English first-class cricketer who played in 12 matches for Warwickshire between 1904 and 1919. He was born in Rugby, Warwickshire and died at Shabani, Rhodesia. His brother Archibald Harris also played first-class cricket for Warwickshire.

Harris was a right-handed batsman sometimes used as an opener and a wicketkeeper. He played single matches for Warwickshire in both 1904 and 1905, returned for five games in 1907, mostly when Dick Lilley was required for Test matches, and then came back for a further five games a dozen years later in 1919.
