= William Lord (cricketer) =

English cricketer

Personal information
- Full name: William Lord
- Born: 8 August 1873; Washwood Heath, Birmingham, England
- Died: 16 June 1906 (aged 32); Erdington, Birmingham, England
- Batting: Left-handed tail-end
- Bowling: Left-arm fast medium bowler
- Role: Bowler

Domestic team information
- Years: Team
- 1897–1899: Warwickshire County Cricket Club

Career statistics
Competition	first-class cricket
Matches	13
Runs scored
Batting average
100s/50s
Top score
Balls bowled
Wickets
Bowling average
5 wickets in innings
10 wickets in match
Best bowling	5/65
Catches/stumpings

William Alston Lord (8 August 1873 – 16 June 1906) was an English cricketer who played first-class cricket in 13 matches for Warwickshire between 1897 and 1899. He was born at Washwood Heath in Birmingham and died at Erdington, also in Birmingham.

Lord was a left-handed tail-end batsman and a left-arm fast medium bowler. He played fairly regularly for Warwickshire at the end of the 1897 season and the start of 1898, but had limited impact. He took five wickets in an innings once, with five for 65 in the match against Gloucestershire in 1897. He reappeared in a single match in 1899 but then disappeared from first-class cricket.
