= Samuel Bates (cricketer) =

English cricketer

Samuel Harold Bates (16 June 1890 – 28 August 1916) was an English cricketer who played first-class cricket in five matches for Warwickshire between 1910 and 1912. He was born at Edgbaston Cricket Ground, Edgbaston, Birmingham, where his father was head groundsman, and died in the fighting of the First World War at Hardecourt-aux-Bois in northern France. In his lifetime, he was generally referred to as "Harold Bates".

The older brother of the batsman Leonard Bates, who played for Warwickshire for more than 20 years on either side of the First World War, Samuel Bates was a right-handed tail-end batsman and a left-arm orthodox spin bowler. He achieved very little in his five first-class matches and his career-best bowling came in Warwickshire's heaviest defeat of their County Championship-winning season of 1911, when he took three Surrey wickets for 56 runs. As well as playing for Warwickshire, Bates was also on the Marylebone Cricket Club ground staff at Lord's.

Bates, with his brother, was among six Warwickshire cricketers to join up to serve in the First World War in September 1914.
