= Jamie McDowall =

English cricketer

Personal information
- Full name: James Ian McDowall
- Born: 9 December 1947 (age 78); Sutton Coldfield, Warwickshire, England
- Batting: Right-handed
- Role: Wicket-keeper

Domestic team information
- Years: Team
- 1969–1973: Warwickshire
- 1969–1970: Cambridge University

Career statistics
Competition	First-class	List A
Matches	29	2
Runs scored	811	1
Batting average	16.89	1.00
100s/50s	–/2	–/–
Top score	89	1
Balls bowled	–	–
Wickets	–	–
Bowling average	–	–
5 wickets in innings	–	–
10 wickets in match	–	–
Best bowling	–	–
Catches/stumpings	50/3	4/–
- Source: Cricinfo, 14 July 2012

James Ian McDowall (born 9 December 1947) is a former English cricketer. McDowall was a right-handed batsman who fielded as a wicket-keeper.

Jamie McDowall was born at Sutton Coldfield, Warwickshire, and was educated at Rugby School and Fitzwilliam College, Cambridge. He made his first-class debut for Cambridge University against Nottinghamshire at Fenner's in 1969. He played first-class cricket for Cambridge University in 1969 and 1970, making a total of seventeen first-class appearances, the last of which came against Warwickshire. In his seventeen matches, he scored a total of 446 runs at an average of 14.86, with a high score of 62. This score was his only half century for the university and came against Leicestershire in 1969. He also took 26 catches and made a single stumping. He gained a Blue in cricket during his time at Cambridge.

It was also in 1969 that he made his debut for Warwickshire in a first-class match against Somerset in the County Championship at Clarence Park, Weston-super-Mare. He made eleven further first-class appearances for Warwickshire, the last of which came against Lancashire in the 1973 County Championship. In his twelve first-class appearances for the county, he scored 365 runs at an average of 20.27, with a high score of 89. This score was his only half century for Warwickshire and came against Oxford University in 1973. He also took 24 catches and made 2 stumpings. McDowall also made two List A appearances for Warwickshire in the 1973 John Player League against Middlesex and Somerset. The presence of first choice wicket-keeper Alan Smith in the Warwickshire side limited his appearances in the first eleven. He left Warwickshire at the end of the 1974 season.

He later served in various positions in Warwickshire's administration.
