= John Lynes =

English cricketer (born 1872)

Personal information
- Full name: John Lynes
- Born: 6 June 1872; Coleshill, Warwickshire, England
- Batting: Right-handed
- Bowling: Right-arm fast-medium

Domestic team information
- Years: Team
- 1897–1905: Warwickshire

Career statistics
Competition	First-class
Matches	8
Runs scored	79
Batting average	9.87
100s/50s	–/–
Top score	26
Balls bowled	933
Wickets	15
Bowling average	38.40
5 wickets in innings	–
10 wickets in match	–
Best bowling	3/54
Catches/stumpings	6/–
- Source: Cricinfo, 27 December 2011

John Lynes (6 June 1872 – date of death unknown) was an English cricketer born at Coleshill, Warwickshire. Lynes was a right-handed batsman who bowled right-arm fast-medium.

Lynes made his first-class debut for Warwickshire against Derbyshire at Edgbaston in the 1897 County Championship. He made seven further first-class appearances for the county, the last of which came against Surrey in the 1905 County Championship. In his eight first-class matches, he took 15 wickets at a bowling average of 38.40, with best figures of 3/54. With the bat, he scored 79 runs at an average of 9.87, with a high score of 26.
