= Norman Street (cricketer) =

English soldier and cricketer (1881–1915)

Norman Kingsley Street (13 August 1881 – 10 August 1915) was an English soldier and a cricketer who played in five first-class cricket matches for Warwickshire in 1908. He was born in Edgbaston, Birmingham and died in the fighting of the First World War at Suvla Bay on the Gallipoli peninsula.

Educated at Bromsgrove School, Street joined the Worcestershire Regiment as a second lieutenant in 1901, was promoted to full lieutenant in 1903 and became a captain in 1911. From 1910 to 1914 he served with the West African Frontier Force but returned to Europe on the outbreak of war.

As a cricketer, Street was a right-handed batsman and he was tried by Warwickshire, mainly as an opening batsman, in five matches at the start of the 1908 season. He had no success, however, and his nine first-class innings yielded just 43 runs with a highest score of only 14.
