= Percy Whitehouse =

English cricketer

Percy Gilbert Whitehouse (1 August 1893 – 24 September 1959) was an English cricketer who played first-class cricket for Warwickshire in three matches in 1926. He was born in Edgbaston, Birmingham and died at Knowle, Solihull, West Midlands.

An amateur off-break bowler and right-handed batsman, Whitehouse played in three County Championship games in the space of 10 days in July 1926 and finished on the losing side each time. His own record was respectable though his highest score was only 13, three not out innings in six visits to the wicket gave him a batting average of 13.66; and he took eight wickets for just 122 runs in all matches, which put him at the top of the county's bowling averages for the season. His best game was his last: in the match against Glamorgan, he took four wickets for 23 runs in the Welsh county's second innings and also held four catches in the match, one in the first innings off his own bowling. He played club cricket for Harborne Cricket Club.
