= Ronnie Miller =

English cricketer (1941–1996)

Personal information
- Full name: Roland Miller
- Born: 6 January 1941; Philadelphia, Co. Durham, England
- Died: 7 May 1996 (aged 55); Nuneaton, Warwickshire, England
- Batting: Right-handed
- Bowling: Slow left-arm orthodox

Domestic team information
- Years: Team
- 1961–1966: Warwickshire

Career statistics
Competition	FC
Matches	133
Runs scored	1658
Batting average	12.56
100s/50s	0/3
Top score	72
Balls bowled	18,173
Wickets	241
Bowling average	30.24
5 wickets in innings	6
10 wickets in match	0
Best bowling	6/28
Catches/stumpings	147/–
- Source: Cricinfo, 12 October 2020

Roland "Ronnie" Miller (6 January 1941 – 7 May 1996) was an English cricketer who played first-class cricket in 133 matches for Warwickshire between 1961 and 1968. He was born in Philadelphia, then in County Durham, now Tyne and Wear, and died at Nuneaton in Warwickshire.

Miller was a right-handed lower-order batsman and a left-arm orthodox spin bowler. He played a single match in the Minor Counties Championship for Durham at the end of the 1960 season, bowling just two balls, but taking a wicket. He then signed for Warwickshire for the 1961 season, playing initially in the second eleven, though making his first-class debut in the match against Cambridge University in mid-June, in which he took four wickets, two in each innings. After this game, he returned to the second eleven, but his prospects were transformed by his performance in the non-first-class game against the South African Fezela XI, a team of young South African cricketers which played three first-class and many other matches in England in 1961, and whose members formed the basis of the highly successful South African Test side of the mid to late 1960s: Miller took six first-innings Fezela wickets with his spin, and then top-scored with 50 in Warwickshire's innings. That propelled him back into Warwickshire's first team, and there he stayed, with only rare demotions to the second eleven, for the next four-and-a-half years.

The Warwickshire side that Miller played in was heavily dependent for bowling on the relentless reliability of the medium-paced Tom Cartwright and a succession of fast-medium seam bowlers of whom David Brown was the most illustrious. In 1961, Miller played alongside Basil Bridge's off-breaks, but Bridge's career stumbled through illness and injury, and from 1962 Warwickshire spin bowling was usually Miller, sometimes paired with a succession of part-time bowlers or transitory players. Between 1962 and 1965 he took around 50 wickets each season and contributed occasional useful runs towards the end of the batting order: his fielding was a strong suit and in 1963 he took 45 catches to finish second in the national figures for non-wicketkeeping fieldsmen. His best bowling figures also came in 1963: he took six Lancashire second-innings wickets in the game at Old Trafford, though he had not bowled at all in the first innings. His batting developed more slowly, but in 1965 he scored 502 first-class runs and averaged more than 15 runs an innings for the only time in his career. His career best score was 72, one of only three innings he made of 50 or more, and it came in the match against Worcestershire in 1965. He was never picked for a one-day match, where Warwickshire preferred to field an all-seam attack. His obituary in Wisden Cricketers' Almanack in 1997 states that "his application never quite matched his natural gifts" and also that he was barred from acting as nightwatchman by Warwickshire after being out hooking at fast bowler Fred Trueman.

In 1966, in an attempt to bolster their spin bowling, Warwickshire signed the Scottish cricketer Jimmy Allan, who had not played regular first-class cricket for almost 10 years. Allan was a left-arm spinner of a similar kind to Miller and, in his youth, had been a much better batsman than Miller ever was. The two operated together as a spin attack for much of the first half of the 1966 season and Miller took close to his usual annual quota of wickets in about half the number of games he had played in the preceding three seasons, and at significantly lower cost. But from mid-season, Allan was preferred and Miller, relegated back to the second eleven, resigned from the club before the end of the season. It was not quite the end of his career: he remained in the Midlands and appeared in a single first-class match for Warwickshire in 1968 and in some second eleven games in 1969.
