= William Hall (cricketer, born 1878) =

English cricketer

Personal information
- Full name: William Hall
- Born: 7 April 1878; Bedworth, Warwickshire, England
- Died: Unknown
- Batting: Right-handed
- Bowling: Right-arm fast

Domestic team information
- Years: Team
- 1905: Warwickshire

Career statistics
Competition	First-class
Matches	2
Runs scored	11
Batting average	3.66
100s/50s	–/–
Top score	8
Balls bowled	96
Wickets	–
Bowling average	–
5 wickets in innings	–
10 wickets in match	–
Best bowling	–
Catches/stumpings	–/–
- Source: Cricinfo, 5 October 2015

William Hall (7 April 1878 – date of death unknown) was an English cricketer who made two appearances in first-class cricket in 1905. He was a right-handed batsman and right-arm fast bowler.

Hall's two appearances for Warwickshire in first-class came against Oxford University at Oxford, and the touring Australians at Edgbaston. He scored a total of 11 runs in his two matches, and went wicketless across both matches.
