= Irv Smith =

Irv Smith may refer to:

- Irv Smith Sr. (born 1971), American football tight end
- Irv Smith Jr. (born 1998), American football tight end
