= Wilfred Potter =

English cricketer

Personal information
- Full name: Wilfred Potter
- Born: 2 May 1910; Swincliffe, Yorkshire, England
- Died: 4 March 1994 (aged 83); Birmingham, Warwickshire, England
- Batting: Right-handed
- Bowling: Leg break

Domestic team information
- Years: Team
- 1932: Warwickshire

Career statistics
Competition	First-class
Matches	1
Runs scored	0
Batting average	0.00
100s/50s	–/–
Top score	0
Balls bowled	72
Wickets	1
Bowling average	31.00
5 wickets in innings	–
10 wickets in match	–
Best bowling	1/19
Catches/stumpings	1/–
- Source: Cricinfo, 30 December 2011

Wilfred Potter (2 May 1910 – 4 March 1994) was an English cricketer. Potter was a right-handed batsman who bowled leg break. He was born at Swincliffe, near Harrogate, Yorkshire.

Potter made a single first-class appearance for Warwickshire against Derbyshire at the County Ground, Derby, in the 1932 County Championship. In Derbyshire's first-innings of 108, Potter took the wicket of Stan Worthington to finish with figures of 1/19 from 8 overs. In Warwickshire's first-innings of 111, Potter was dismissed for a duck by Thomas Armstrong, while in Derbyshire's second-innings of 214/7 declared, he bowled 4 wicketless overs. Warwickshire were set a target of 212 for victory, but could only make 88, with Potter making his second duck of the match when he was dismissed by Armstrong. This was his only major appearance for Warwickshire.

He died at Birmingham, Warwickshire on 4 March 1994.
