= Frederick Taylor (cricketer) =

English cricketer

Personal information
- Full name: Frederick Taylor
- Born: 29 April 1916; Leek, Staffordshire, England
- Died: 18 June 1999 (aged 83); Stoke-on-Trent, Staffordshire, England
- Batting: Right-handed
- Bowling: Right-arm fast-medium
- Relatives: Charles Taylor (father)

Domestic team information
- Years: Team
- 1953: Minor Counties
- 1939: Warwickshire
- 1937–1951: Staffordshire

Career statistics
Competition	First-class
Matches	2
Runs scored	8
Batting average	2.66
100s/50s	–/–
Top score	8
Balls bowled	394
Wickets	8
Bowling average	17.75
5 wickets in innings	1
10 wickets in match	–
Best bowling	5/71
Catches/stumpings	3/–
- Source: Cricinfo, 8 June 2014

Frederick Taylor (29 April 1916 – 18 June 1999) was an English cricketer active in the late 1930s, late 1940s and early 1950s. Born at Leek, Staffordshire, Taylor was a right-handed batsman and right-arm fast-medium bowler who made two appearances in first-class cricket, though was mostly associated with minor counties cricket.

== Career ==
Taylor made his debut in county cricket for Staffordshire in the 1937 Minor Counties Championship against Northumberland, making ten appearances in that season. He made three appearances for Staffordshire in 1938, before playing a first-class match for Warwickshire against Cambridge University, although he took three wickets in the match, this was to be his only appearance for the county.

Following the end of the Second World War, Taylor resumed his minor counties career with Staffordshire, playing intermittently until 1951, making a total of 29 Minor Counties Championship appearances since 1937 and taking 124 wickets for the county, including 8 five wicket hauls in the minor counties championship. His best season came in 1946, when he took 37 wickets in his eight matches. Despite having not played minor counties cricket since 1951, Taylor was selected to play for a combined Minor Counties cricket team in 1953 against the touring Australians, taking a five wicket haul in the Australians' first-innings on a pitch which was described by Wisden as one which "left much to be desired for a game of such importance", and showed uneven bounce from Taylor's medium pace.

He died at Stoke-on-Trent, Staffordshire on 18 June 1999. His father Charles Taylor also played first-class cricket.
