= William Ward (cricketer, born 1874) =

English cricketer

Personal information
- Full name: William Ward
- Born: 24 May 1874; Birmingham, Warwickshire, England
- Died: 13 December 1961 (aged 87); Birmingham, Warwickshire, England
- Batting: Left-handed
- Bowling: Slow left-arm orthodox

Domestic team information
- Years: Team
- 1895–1904: Warwickshire

Career statistics
Competition	First-class
Matches	11
Runs scored	79
Batting average	7.18
100s/50s	0/0
Top score	26
Balls bowled	1,937
Wickets	30
Bowling average	32.16
5 wickets in innings	2
10 wickets in match	0
Best bowling	5/61
Catches/stumpings	3/–
- Source: ESPNcricinfo, 11 October 2015

William Ward (24 May 1874 – 13 December 1961) was an English cricketer active in first-class cricket between 1895 and 1904. He played as a left-handed batsman and slow left-arm orthodox bowler.

Ward made his debut in first-class cricket for Warwickshire against Hampshire in the 1895 County Championship at Edgbaston. He played one further match in 1895 against the same opponents at Southampton, before making eight further first-class appearances in 1896, including playing against the touring Australians. Ward would later play his final first-class fixture for Warwickshire eight years later in 1904 against Cambridge University. In a total of eleven first-class matches, Ward scored 79 runs as a tailend batsman, averaging 7.18, with a high score of 26. With the ball, Ward took 30 wickets with his slow left-arm orthodox, averaging 32.16 runs per wicket. He twice took a five wicket haul and had career best figures of 5/61, taken against Hampshire in his debut match. He was later engaged as the professional at Lancashire League clubs Bacup (1907–1908) and Church (1909).

He died at Birmingham on 13 December 1961.
