= Gwynfor Benson =

English cricketer

Personal information
- Full name: Gwynfor Leonard Benson
- Born: 7 January 1941 (age 85); Birmingham, Warwickshire, England
- Batting: Right-handed
- Bowling: Right-arm off break

Domestic team information
- Years: Team
- 1959–1961: Warwickshire

Career statistics
Competition	First-class
Matches	3
Runs scored	102
Batting average	34.00
100s/50s	–/–
Top score	46
Balls bowled	102
Wickets	2
Bowling average	16.00
5 wickets in innings	–
10 wickets in match	–
Best bowling	2/25
Catches/stumpings	1/–
- Source: Cricinfo, 18 December 2011

Gwynfor Leonard Benson (born 7 January 1941) is a former English cricketer. Benson was a right-handed batsman who bowled right-arm off break. He was born at Birmingham, Warwickshire.

Benson made his first-class debut for Warwickshire against Scotland in 1959. He made two further first-class appearances for the county, both of which came in 1961 against Oxford University and Cambridge University. In his three first-class matches, he scored a total of 102 runs at an average of 34.00, with a highest score of 46. With the ball, he took 2 wickets at a bowling average of 16.00, with best figures of 2/25.
