= Richard Tudor =

English cricketer

Personal information
- Full name: Richard Thornhill Tudor
- Born: 27 September 1948 (age 78); Shrewsbury, Shropshire, England
- Batting: Right-handed
- Bowling: Right-arm medium

Domestic team information
- Years: Team
- 1975–1977: Shropshire
- 1976: Warwickshire

Career statistics
Competition	First-class
Matches	1
Runs scored	6
Batting average	6.00
100s/50s	0/0
Top score	6
Balls bowled	90
Wickets	0
Bowling average	–
5 wickets in innings	–
10 wickets in match	–
Best bowling	–
Catches/stumpings	0/–
- Source: Cricinfo, 28 September 2011

Richard Thornhill Tudor (born 27 September 1948) is a former English cricketer. Tudor was a right-handed batsman who bowled right-arm medium pace. He was born in Shrewsbury, Shropshire and educated at Shrewsbury School.

Tudor made his only first-class appearance for Warwickshire against Cambridge University in 1976. In this match, he bowled a total of fifteen wicket-less overs. He did not bat in Warwickshire's first-innings, but in the second innings he was promoted to open, scoring 6 runs before being dismissed by Charles Bannister. He made no further appearances for Warwickshire.

Before and after playing for Warwickshire, Tudor played Minor counties cricket for Shropshire, making his debut for the county in the 1975 Minor Counties Championship against Durham. He played Minor counties cricket for Shropshire from 1975 to 1977, making nine appearances.
