= Hubert Perkins =

English cricketer

Personal information
- Full name: Hubert George Perkins
- Born: 18 June 1907; Attleborough, Warwickshire, England
- Died: 4 May 1935 (aged 27); Nuneaton, Warwickshire, England
- Batting: Left-handed
- Bowling: Slow left-arm orthodox

Domestic team information
- Years: Team
- 1926–1927: Warwickshire

Career statistics
Competition	First-class
Matches	4
Runs scored	10
Batting average	3.33
100s/50s	–/–
Top score	6*
Balls bowled	126
Wickets	1
Bowling average	55.00
5 wickets in innings	–
10 wickets in match	–
Best bowling	1/30
Catches/stumpings	1/–
- Source: Cricinfo, 8 May 2012

Hubert George Perkins (18 June 1907 – 4 May 1935) was an English cricketer. Perkins was a left-handed batsman who bowled slow left-arm orthodox. He was born at Attleborough, Warwickshire.

Perkins made his first-class debut for Warwickshire against Glamorgan at Edgbaston in the 1926 County Championship. He made three further first-class appearances for the county, the last of which came against Glamorgan at St. Helen's, Swansea, in the 1927 County Championship. In his four first-class appearances for the county, he scored 10 runs at a batting average of 3.33, with a high score of 6 not out. With the ball, he bowled 21 overs (126 balls) but only took a single wicket, that of Glamorgan's Jock Tait.

He died at Nuneaton, Warwickshire, on 4 May 1935.
