= Albert Wassell =

English cricketer

Personal information
- Full name: Albert Wassell
- Born: 14 June 1892; Aston, Birmingham
- Died: 27 April 1975 (aged 82); Erdington, Birmingham
- Bowling: Left-arm orthodox spin
- Role: Bowler

Domestic team information
- Years: Team
- 1923: Warwickshire
- First-class debut: 2 June 1923 Warwickshire v Hampshire
- Last First-class: 31 August 1923 Warwickshire v Surrey

Career statistics
Competition	FC
Matches	7
Runs scored	24
Batting average	3.00
100s/50s	0/0
Top score	10
Balls bowled	654
Wickets	10
Bowling average	34.40
5 wickets in innings	0
10 wickets in match	0
Best bowling	3/67
Catches/stumpings	4/–
- Source: CricketArchive, 20 December 2015

Albert Wassell (14 June 1892 – 27 April 1975) was an English cricketer who played first-class cricket in seven matches for Warwickshire in 1923. He was born in Aston and died in Erdington, both in Birmingham.

Warwickshire's bowling in 1923 was heavily dependent on the fast bowler, Harry Howell, who took nearly three times the number of wickets of any other player, and whose main support came from the amateur players Freddie Calthorpe and Norman Partridge. Wassell was one of several professionals introduced to the team in an attempt to bolster the bowling; he was a lower-order batsman whose batting hand is unknown and a slow left-arm orthodox spin bowler. Though given seven games, he was not a success. He reached double figures as a batsman only once and his best bowling in an innings was three wickets for 67 runs in the match against Gloucestershire. He did not play any further first-class cricket after the 1923 season.

CricketArchive records that his birth was registered as "Albert Wassall".
