= Martin Bayley =

English cricketer

Personal information
- Full name: Martin George Bayley
- Born: 10 July 1952 (age 74); Leamington Spa, Warwickshire, England
- Batting: Right-handed
- Bowling: Slow left-arm orthodox

Domestic team information
- Years: Team
- 1969: Warwickshire

Career statistics
Competition	First-class
Matches	2
Runs scored	2
Batting average	2.00
100s/50s	–/–
Top score	1*
Balls bowled	318
Wickets	3
Bowling average	41.66
5 wickets in innings	–
10 wickets in match	–
Best bowling	2/54
Catches/stumpings	2/–
- Source: Cricinfo, 22 December 2011

Martin George Bayley (born 10 July 1952) is an English former cricketer. Bayley was a right-handed batsman who bowled slow left-arm orthodox. He was born in Leamington Spa, Warwickshire.

Bayley made two first-class appearances for Warwickshire in 1969 against Cambridge University and Scotland. Against Cambridge University, Bayley took the wicket of Roger Knight in Cambridge University's first-innings, finishing with figures of 1/26 from 5 overs. He didn't bowl in the university's second-innings and wasn't called upon to bat in the match, which ended in a narrow 17 run victory for Warwickshire. Against Scotland, Bayley bowled 20 wicketless overs in Scotland's first-innings, while in Warwickshire's first-innings he ended not out on 1. In Scotland's second-innings, he took the wickets of David Stewart and James Brown to finish with figures of 2/54 from 28 overs. He was dismissed for a single run in Warwickshire's second-innings by Jimmy Allan, with Scotland winning the match by 4 wickets. These were his only major appearances for Warwickshire.
