= Wilfred Sanders =

English cricketer

Wilfred Sanders (4 April 1910 – 22 May 1965) was an English cricketer who played first-class cricket between 1928 and 1934 for Warwickshire. He was born in Chilvers Coton, Warwickshire, and died in Nuneaton, also in Warwickshire.

Sanders was a right-handed lower-order batsman and a right-arm medium-pace bowler who played as a professional. He first appeared in first-class cricket in the 1928 season and was identified in the Wisden Cricketers' Almanack report on Warwickshire for that season as "a player of real promise". He played in a dozen matches that season and against Northamptonshire he took four first-innings wickets for 44 runs and these were the best bowling figures of his career: he never achieved five wickets in an innings.

Sanders was again an irregular player in the 1929 season, but in both 1930 and 1931 he held a regular place in the Warwickshire side, though his batting and bowling figures indicate that he rarely made the headlines. In 1930, he had his only days of batting success. Against Yorkshire, batting at No 11, he joined Reg Santall with Warwickshire still 30 runs short of avoiding an innings defeat and proceeded to hit 54 in a last-wicket partnership of 128 that was a Warwickshire record at the time. Four weeks later, under less pressure in the first innings of a run-heavy match, Sanders and Santall all but repeated the feat, putting on 126 for the ninth wicket against Nottinghamshire, and Sanders' 64 was his highest score. He maintained his place in the team throughout 1931, but his bowling was not effective, with just 29 wickets in his 23 games at the high average of 43.93 runs per wicket.

After that, Sanders' first-class cricket career petered out. In both 1932 and 1933, he was again an infrequent player and he played his last first-class game in 1934, though he was in the Warwickshire second eleven up to 1937.
