= Robert Cotton (cricketer) =

English cricketer

Personal information
- Full name: Robert Henry Cotton
- Born: 5 November 1909; Birmingham, Warwickshire, England
- Died: 17 January 1979 (aged 69); Warley, Staffordshire, England
- Batting: Right-handed
- Bowling: Right-arm fast

Domestic team information
- Years: Team
- 1947: Warwickshire

Career statistics
Competition	First-class
Matches	2
Runs scored	0
Batting average	0.00
100s/50s	–/–
Top score	0*
Balls bowled	264
Wickets	2
Bowling average	64.00
5 wickets in innings	–
10 wickets in match	–
Best bowling	2/42
Catches/stumpings	–/–
- Source: Cricinfo, 23 December 2011

Robert Henry Cotton (5 November 1909 – 17 January 1979) was an English cricketer. Cotton was a right-handed batsman who bowled right-arm fast. He was born at Birmingham, Warwickshire.

Cotton made two first-class appearances for Warwickshire against Lancashire and Sussex in the 1947 County Championship. Against Lancashire, Cotton was dismissed in Warwickshire's first-innings of 207 for a duck by Eddie Phillipson, while in Lancashire's first-innings he opened the bowling, though went wicketless from his 25 overs which conceded 80 runs. He wasn't required to bat in Warwickshire's second-innings, with the match ending in a draw. Against Sussex, he ended not out on 0 in Warwickshire's first-innings total of 216, while in Sussex's first-innings he bowled 6 wicketless overs, though he conceded just 6 runs from them. He was dismissed for a duck in Warwickshire's second-innings by George Cox, while in Sussex's second-innings he took the wickets of Robert Hunt and Hugh Bartlett, finishing with figures of 2/42 from 13 overs. These were his only major appearances for Warwickshire.

He died at Warley, Staffordshire on 17 January 1979.
