= Christopher O'Rourke =

English cricketer

Personal information
- Full name: Christopher O'Rourke
- Born: 13 March 1945 (age 81); Widnes, Lancashire, England
- Batting: Right-handed
- Role: Wicket-keeper

Domestic team information
- Years: Team
- 1968: Warwickshire

Career statistics
| Competition | First-class |
|---|---|
| Matches | 1 |
| Runs scored | 23 |
| Batting average | – |
| 100s/50s | –/– |
| Top score | 23* |
| Balls bowled | – |
| Wickets | – |
| Bowling average | – |
| 5 wickets in innings | – |
| 10 wickets in match | – |
| Best bowling | – |
| Catches/stumpings | 3/– |
- Source: Cricinfo, 22 December 2011

Christopher O'Rourke (born 13 March 1945) is an English former cricketer. O'Rourke was a right-handed batsman who fielded as a wicket-keeper. He was born at Widnes, Lancashire.

O'Rourke made a single first-class appearance for Warwickshire against Scotland at Edgbaston in 1968. In this match, he ended Warwickshire's first-innings of 350 unbeaten on 23. Scotland were dismissed for just 88 in their first-innings, with O'Rourke who was keeping wicket in the match taking a single catch in that innings. Scotland were forced to follow-on and made 76/5, with O'Rourke taking a further two catches in that innings. The match ended in a draw. This was his only major appearance for Warwickshire.
