= 1975 County Championship =

English cricket tournament

- Dates: 30 Apr – 17 September 1975
- Administrator: England and Wales Cricket Board
- Cricket format: First-class cricket
- Tournament format: League system
- Champions: Leicestershire (1st title)
- Participants: 17
- Matches: 170
- Most runs: Geoffrey Boycott, (Yorkshire); 1,891
- Most wickets: Peter Lee, (Lancashire); 107

The 1975 County Championship was the 76th officially organised running of the County Championship. Leicestershire won their first Championship title.

== Table ==
- 10 points for a win
- 5 points to each team for a tie
- 5 points to team still batting in a match in which scores finish level
- Bonus points awarded in first 100 overs of first innings
  - Batting: 150 runs - 1 point, 200 runs - 2 points 250 runs - 3 points, 300 runs - 4 points
  - Bowling: 3-4 wickets - 1 point, 5-6 wickets - 2 points 7-8 wickets - 3 points, 9-10 wickets - 4 points
- No bonus points awarded in a match starting with less than 8 hours' play remaining.
- The two first innings limited to a total of 200 overs. The team batting first limited to 100 overs. Any overs up to 100 not used by the team batting first could be added to the overs of the team batting second.
- Position determined by points gained. If equal, then decided on most wins.
- Each team plays 20 matches.
- All counties are required to achieve an overall average of at least 19.5 overs per hour. In the calculation, two minutes will be allowed for each wicket taken. Counties failing to reach this average will be fined £1000, half to be paid by the club and half by the players. The fines to be assed after ten matches and at the end of the season. Club fines to go to the N.C.A., players fines to go to the Cricketers' Association.

	Team	P	W	L	D	Bat	Bowl	Pts
1	Leicestershire	20	12	1	7	61	59	240
2	Yorkshire	20	10	1	9	56	68	224
3	Hampshire	20	10	6	4	51	72	223
4	Lancashire	20	9	3	8	57	72	219
5	Kent	20	8	4	8	59	70	209
6	Surrey	20	8	3	9	55	67	202
7	Essex	20	7	6	7	61	67	198
8	Northamptonshire	20	7	9	4	40	72	182
9	Glamorgan	20	7	8	5	45	66	181
10	Worcestershire	20	5	6	9	55	63	168
11	Middlesex	20	6	7	7	45	59	164
12	Somerset	20	4	8	8	51	65	156
13	Nottinghamshire	20	3	9	8	59	67	156
14	Warwickshire	20	4	10	6	48	65	153
15	Derbyshire	20	5	7	8	33	69	152
16	Gloucestershire	20	4	10	6	43	62	145
17	Sussex	20	2	13	5	37	62	119
