= Frank Morter =

English cricketer

Personal information
- Full name: Frank William Morter
- Born: 14 August 1897; Downe, Kent, England
- Died: 20 December 1958 (aged 61); Birmingham, Warwickshire, England
- Batting: Right-handed
- Bowling: Right-arm medium-fast

Domestic team information
- Years: Team
- 1922: Warwickshire

Career statistics
Competition	First-class
Matches	3
Runs scored	13
Batting average	4.33
100s/50s	–/–
Top score	8
Balls bowled	258
Wickets	3
Bowling average	46.00
5 wickets in innings	–
10 wickets in match	–
Best bowling	2/5
Catches/stumpings	–/–
- Source: Cricinfo, 9 May 2012

Frank William Morter (14 August 1897 – 20 December 1958) was an English cricketer. Morter was a right-handed batsman who bowled right-arm medium-fast. He was born at Downe, Kent.

Morter made his first-class debut for Warwickshire against Yorkshire at the Fartown Ground, Huddersfield, in the 1922 County Championship. He made two further first-class appearances for the county in that same season, against Kent at Edgbaston, and Leicestershire at Aylestone Road, Leicester. In his three first-class appearances for the county, he took a total of 3 wickets at an average of 46.00, with best figures of 2/5. With the bat, he scored 13 runs at a batting average of 4.33, with a high score of 8.

He died at Birmingham, Warwickshire, on 20 December 1958.
