= Malcolm White (cricketer) =

English cricketer

Personal information
- Full name: Malcolm Frank White
- Born: 15 May 1924; Walsall, Staffordshire, England
- Died: 12 January 2009 (aged 84)
- Batting: Right-handed
- Role: Wicket-keeper

Domestic team information
- Years: Team
- 1954: Staffordshire
- 1946: Warwickshire

Career statistics
Competition	First-class
Matches	1
Runs scored	0
Batting average	0.00
100s/50s	–/–
Top score	0
Balls bowled	–
Wickets	–
Bowling average	–
5 wickets in innings	–
10 wickets in match	–
Best bowling	–
Catches/stumpings	3/1
- Source: Cricinfo, 7 April 2012

Malcolm Frank White (15 May 1924 – 12 January 2009) was an English cricketer. A specialist wicket-keeper, White was also a right-handed batsman. He was born at Walsall, Staffordshire.

White was educated at Queen Mary's Grammar School, Walsall. He later attended Magdalene College, Cambridge. He attended Magdalene College during World War II, during which first-class cricket was suspended and virtually no university cricket took place, meaning White missed out on a Blue. In 1944 he was the university's secretary. With the resumption of first-class cricket in 1946, White made a single first-class appearance in that season for Warwickshire against Derbyshire at Edgbaston. He was dismissed for a duck twice in the match, run out in Warwickshire's first-innings and bowled by Bill Copson in their second-innings. Behind the stumps he took three catches and made a single stumping. This was his only major appearance for Warwickshire. He later made two appearances for Staffordshire in the 1954 Minor Counties Championship against the Lancashire Second XI and the Warwickshire Second XI.

He died on 12 January 2009 aged 84.
