= Norman Sharp (cricketer) =

English cricketer

Personal information
- Full name: Norman Sharp
- Born: 15 April 1901; Derby, Derbyshire, England
- Died: 14 July 1977 (aged 76); Sutton Coldfield, Warwickshire, England
- Batting: Right-handed

Domestic team information
- Years: Team
- 1923: Warwickshire

Career statistics
Competition	First-class
Matches	1
Runs scored	3
Batting average	3.00
100s/50s	–/–
Top score	3
Balls bowled	–
Wickets	–
Bowling average	–
5 wickets in innings	–
10 wickets in match	–
Best bowling	–
Catches/stumpings	1/–
- Source: Cricinfo, 25 October 2015

Norman Sharp (15 April 1901 – 14 July 1977) was an English cricketer who made one appearance in first-class cricket in 1923. He played as a right-handed batsman.

Sharp made his only appearance in first-class cricket when he was selected to play for Warwickshire against Worcestershire in the County Championship at Edgbaston. He batted just once in the match, which Warwickshire won by 7 wickets, scoring 3 runs from the lower-order, before being dismissed bowled by Leslie Gale.

He died at Sutton Coldfield, Warwickshire on 14 July 1977.
