= Irving Smith (cricketer) =

English cricketer

Irving Wilmot Smith (5 February 1884 – 21 October 1971) was an English cricketer who played first-class cricket in a single match for Warwickshire in 1905. He was born in Harborne, Birmingham, and died in Sutton Coldfield, Warwickshire.

Smith was educated at King Edward's School, Birmingham, where he played in the cricket eleven as a middle-order right-handed batsman and a right-arm medium-pace bowler who could also bowl leg breaks. His single first-class match was the game between Warwickshire and Yorkshire in May 1905, a run-heavy game that petered out to a dull draw; he made one run in his only innings and bowled nine overs, conceding only 13 runs but failing to take a wicket. A contemporary report of the match refers to him as "the Harborne colt" and singles him out from the Warwickshire bowlers for his control: "A bowler who seemed less easy to score from than any one else on the home side was Mr. Irving W. Smith ... who, bowling with breaks from leg, kept a consistently good length." Smith was not, however, selected for any further county games.
