= Thomas Rhodes (cricketer) =

English cricketer

Personal information
- Full name: Thomas Basil Rhodes
- Born: 13 August 1874; Uttoxeter, Staffordshire, England
- Died: 26 May 1936 (aged 61); Rustington, Sussex, England
- Batting: Right-handed
- Role: Occasional wicket-keeper

Domestic team information
- Years: Team
- 1899: Warwickshire
- 1895–1896: Worcestershire

Career statistics
| Competition | First-class |
|---|---|
| Matches | 4 |
| Runs scored | 105 |
| Batting average | 17.50 |
| 100s/50s | –/1 |
| Top score | 55 |
| Catches/stumpings | 3/– |
- Source: Cricinfo, 27 December 2011

Thomas Basil Rhodes (13 August 1874 – 26 May 1936) was an English cricketer. Rhodes was a right-handed batsman who occasionally fielded as a wicket-keeper. He was born at Uttoxeter, Staffordshire, and was educated at Malvern College.

Rhodes made his debut in county cricket for Worcestershire in the 1895 Minor Counties Championship against Oxfordshire. He played Minor counties cricket for Worcestershire in 1895 and 1896, making a total of six appearances. Rhodes later made his first-class debut for Warwickshire against Gloucestershire in the 1899 County Championship. He made three further first-class appearances for the county in that season, against Hampshire, Kent and Surrey. In his four first-class matches, he scored 105 runs at an average of 17.50, with a high score of 55. This score was his only first-class fifty and came against on debut against Gloucestershire.

He died at Rustington, Sussex on 26 May 1936.
