= Bert Wolton =

English cricketer

Personal information
- Full name: Albert Victor George Wolton
- Born: 12 June 1919; Maidenhead, Berkshire, England
- Died: 9 September 1990 (aged 71); Solihull, Warwickshire, England
- Batting: Right-handed
- Bowling: Right-arm off-spin

Domestic team information
- Years: Team
- 1947 to 1960: Warwickshire

Career statistics
Competition	First-class
Matches	297
Runs scored	12,930
Batting average	31.00
100s/50s	12/76
Top score	165
Balls bowled	2934
Wickets	37
Bowling average	33.16
5 wickets in innings	0
10 wickets in match	0
Best bowling	4/15
Catches/stumpings	118/0
- Source: Cricinfo, 21 June 2020

Albert Victor George Wolton (12 June 1919 – 9 September 1990) was an English cricketer. He was a right-hand batsman and right-arm off-spin bowler who played for Warwickshire.

== Cricket career ==
Born in Maidenhead, Berkshire, Wolton began his cricket career with his home county, playing seven matches in the 1939 Minor Counties Championship.

After the Second World War Wolton played in the Birmingham League before making his first-class debut in 1947, aged 28. He played 297 first-class matches during his career, scoring 12,930 runs at an average of 31.00. All but one of those appearances came for Warwickshire, the other occurred in 1956 when selected for the North against the South.

During eight of his seasons, Wolton exceeded 1,000 runs. His most productive season was in 1955 when he scored 1,809 runs at 34.13, including three centuries. He scored a total of 12 centuries during his career. His highest score was 165 against Worcestershire in 1954.

Wolton's off-spin took 37 first-class wickets at 33.16, 22 of these victims came in single season, 1953. His best record of 4/15 was against Middlesex. He took 118 catches and his fielding is described in Wisden as "outstanding by the standards of any era".

Wolton was a regular in the 1951 season when Warwickshire won the County Championship; he contributed 984 runs to their success.

In 1959 Wolton's benefit match was the home fixture with Surrey, from which he received more than £3,000. He made his final appearance for the club in 1960, scoring 2 and 0.
