= Jack Kendall (cricketer) =

English cricketer

John Thomas Kendall (31 March 1921 – 7 January 2011) was an English cricketer who played first-class cricket in four matches for Warwickshire in 1948 and 1949. He was born and died at Coventry.

A right-handed lower-order batsman and a wicketkeeper, Kendall played two matches in each of his two seasons with Warwickshire, and in 1949 played a full season with the county's second eleven. But three of his four games were less important non-County Championship matches and he was not able to displace the regular wicketkeeper Dick Spooner, who had been specially registered for the start of the 1948 season. Kendall's only Championship match was his last first-class game: the match against Leicestershire in 1949 in which he took three catches and made one stumping.
