= Norman Partridge (cricketer) =

English cricketer

Norman Ernest Partridge (10 August 1900 – 10 March 1982) was an English cricketer who played for Cambridge University and Warwickshire.

Partridge was born at Great Barr, Birmingham. He was selected by Wisden in 1919, while a schoolboy at Malvern College, as one its five Cricketers of the Year, there being no first-class cricket the previous year from which to pick outstanding performers because of the First World War. Partridge's record at Malvern as a right-hand batsman and, particularly, as a fast-medium in-swing bowler also led him, in 1919, to be chosen to play for the Gentlemen in the annual Gentlemen v Players match between the amateurs and the professionals at Lord's, then one of the highlights of the cricket season, but his school refused to allow him to take part. In 1936, towards the end of his career, he finally appeared in a Gentlemen v Players match, though it was an end-of-season festival affair at Folkestone rather than the Lord's fixture.

After Malvern, he was at Pembroke College, Cambridge, for only one year, 1920, and won a Blue in the rain-ruined University Match. From 1921 to 1937, he played for Warwickshire, fairly regularly at first, latterly more seldom. He usually batted low in the batting order, but managed a career average of 18.62 and he frequently opened the bowling. In all first-class cricket, he scored more than 2,700 runs and took 393 wickets.

Partridge died at Aberystwyth. His obituary in Wisden Cricketers' Almanack recounts that there was some doubt about the legality of his bowling action, though he was never called for throwing. It says: "A batsman whom he had comprehensively bowled said indignantly to Tiger Smith behind the wicket, 'He threw that'. 'Yes,' said Tiger, 'and bloody well too'."
