= 1974 English cricket season =

The 1974 English cricket season was the 75th in which the County Championship had been an official competition. The recent pattern of joint tours continued with India and Pakistan again playing three Tests each against England. Worcestershire won the County Championship.

== Honours ==
- County Championship - Worcestershire
- Gillette Cup - Kent
- Sunday League - Leicestershire
- Benson & Hedges Cup - Surrey
- Minor Counties Championship - Oxfordshire
- Second XI Championship - Middlesex II
- Wisden - Dennis Amiss, Mike Denness, Norman Gifford, Tony Greig, Andy Roberts

== Leading batsmen ==
1974 English cricket season – leading batsmen by average
Name	Innings	Runs	Highest	Average	100s
Clive Lloyd	31	1458	178*	63.39	4
Barry Richards	27	1406	225*	61.13	4
Glenn Turner	31	1332	202*	60.54	3
Geoffrey Boycott	36	1783	160*	59.43	6
Roy Virgin	39	1936	144*	56.94	7

1974 English cricket season – leading batsmen by aggregate
Name	Innings	Runs	Highest	Average	100s
Roy Virgin	39	1936	144*	56.94	7
John Jameson	42	1932	240*	48.30	6
Geoffrey Boycott	36	1783	160*	59.43	6
Pasty Harris	41	1690	133	44.47	6
Brian Davison	39	1670	142	46.38	4

== Leading bowlers ==
1974 English cricket season – leading bowlers by average
Name	Balls	Maidens	Runs	Wickets	Average
Andy Roberts	4366	198	1621	119	13.62
Geoff Arnold	2922	140	1069	75	14.25
Vanburn Holder	3954	146	1493	94	15.88
Mike Procter	1869	80	776	47	16.51
Basil D'Oliveira	2073	105	697	40	17.42

1974 English cricket season – leading bowlers by aggregate
Name	Balls	Maidens	Runs	Wickets	Average
Andy Roberts	4366	198	1621	119	13.62
Bishan Bedi	6513	306	2760	112	24.64
Vanburn Holder	3954	146	1493	94	15.88
Fred Titmus	5648	312	1953	88	22.19
Robin Jackman	3985	146	1744	84	20.76

== Annual reviews ==
- Playfair Cricket Annual 1975
- Wisden Cricketers' Almanack 1975
