= Leonard Morris (cricketer) =

English cricketer

Leonard John Morris (26 September 1898 – 9 March 1984) was an English cricketer who played a few first-class cricket matches for Warwickshire in 1925 and 1926. He was born in Aston, Birmingham, and died at Dorridge, West Midlands.

A stalwart of Birmingham club cricket, Morris played in first-class cricket as an amateur, and was a left-handed middle-order batsman and a right-arm medium-pace bowler. He played in a single match in 1925, scoring 20 and 27, taking one wicket and two catches. In 1926, he played regularly for Warwickshire in a four-week period from the end of June, appearing in six games. His greatest personal success came in the match against Glamorgan in which he scored 53 and 76, the only times in which he exceeded 50 with the bat. He did not appear for the Warwickshire first eleven again after these matches.
