= Dennis Harris (cricketer) =

English cricketer (1911–1959)

Personal information
- Full name: Dennis Frank Harris
- Born: 18 April 1911; Birmingham, Warwickshire, England
- Died: 17 December 1959 (aged 48); Birmingham, Warwickshire, England
- Batting: Right-handed

Domestic team information
- Years: Team
- 1946: Warwickshire

Career statistics
Competition	First-class
Matches	1
Runs scored	2
Batting average	2.00
100s/50s	–/–
Top score	2
Balls bowled	–
Wickets	–
Bowling average	–
5 wickets in innings	–
10 wickets in match	–
Best bowling	–
Catches/stumpings	–/–
- Source: Cricinfo, 13 May 2012

Dennis Frank Harris (1 January 1911 – 17 December 1959) was an English cricketer. Harris was a right-handed batsman. He was born at Birmingham, Warwickshire, and was educated at King Edward's School, Birmingham.

Harris made a single first-class appearance for Warwickshire against Gloucestershire at the Ashley Down Ground, Bristol, in the 1946 County Championship. Harris batted once during the match, scoring 2 runs in Warwickshire's first-innings, before he was dismissed by Charlie Barnett. The match ended in a draw. This was his only major appearance for Warwickshire.

He died at the city of his birth on 17 December 1959.
