= 1907 County Championship =

English cricket tournament

- Cricket format: First-class cricket (3 days)
- Tournament format: League system
- Champions: Nottinghamshire (1st title)
- Participants: 16
- Most runs: Ernie Hayes (1,721 for Surrey)
- Most wickets: George Dennett (184 for Gloucestershire)

Location of the home ground of each county

The 1907 County Championship was the 18th officially organised running of the County Championship, and ran from 2 May to 2 September 1907. Nottinghamshire won its first championship title, while Worcestershire and Yorkshire tied for second place. The previous season's winners, Kent, finished in eighth place.

== Table ==
- One point was awarded for a win, and one point was taken away for each loss. Final placings were decided by dividing the number of points earned by the number of completed matches (i.e. those that ended in a win or a loss), and multiplying by 100.

Team	Pld	W	L	D	A	Pts	Fin	%Fin
Nottinghamshire	20	15	0	4	1	15	15	100.00
Worcestershire	18	8	2	8	0	6	10	60.00
Yorkshire	28	12	3	11	2	9	15	60.00
Surrey	28	12	4	12	0	8	16	50.00
Middlesex	20	8	4	8	0	4	12	33.33
Lancashire	26	11	7	8	0	4	18	22.22
Essex	22	10	7	5	0	3	17	17.64
Kent	26	12	9	5	0	3	21	14.28
Warwickshire	20	6	5	8	1	1	11	9.09
Gloucestershire	22	8	12	2	0	–4	20	–20.00
Leicestershire	20	6	10	4	0	–4	16	–25.00
Hampshire	24	6	11	7	0	–5	17	–29.41
Sussex	26	7	13	6	0	–6	20	–30.00
Somerset	18	3	12	3	0	–9	15	–60.00
Northamptonshire	20	2	12	6	0	–10	14	–71.42
Derbyshire	22	2	17	1	2	–15	19	–78.94

== Records ==
=== Batting ===
Most runs
Aggregate	Average	Player	County
1,721	37.41	Ernie Hayes	Surrey
1,717	40.88	Jack Hobbs	Surrey
1,597	38.02	Johnny Tyldesley	Lancashire
1,570	46.17	Tom Hayward	Surrey
1,483	38.02	James Seymour	Kent

=== Bowling ===
Most wickets
Aggregate	Average	Player	County
184	15.65	George Dennett	Gloucestershire
153	11.78	Albert Hallam	Nottinghamshire
151	16.87	Arthur Fielder	Kent
145	13.57	Thomas Wass	Nottinghamshire
141	16.41	Wilfred Rhodes	Yorkshire
