= Ossie Wheatley =

English cricketer

Ossie Wheatley CBE
Personal information
- Full name: Oswald Stephen Wheatley
- Born: 28 May 1935 (age 91); Low Fell, Gateshead, County Durham, England
- Batting: Right-handed
- Bowling: Right arm fast-medium

Career statistics
Competition	First-class
Matches	316
Runs scored	1,252
Batting average	5.79
100s/50s	0/0
Top score	34 not out
Balls bowled	59,683
Wickets	1,099
Bowling average	20.84
5 wickets in innings	56
10 wickets in match	5
Best bowling	9-61
Catches/stumpings	156/0
- Source: CricketArchive

Oswald Stephen Wheatley CBE (born 28 May 1935) is a former cricketer who played for Cambridge University, Warwickshire and Glamorgan, whom he captained from 1961 to 1966.

Wheatley was born at Low Fell, Gateshead, County Durham. He was educated at King Edward's School, Birmingham, and Gonville and Caius College, Cambridge. A tall, fair-haired right-arm fast-medium bowler, he came to prominence for Cambridge University in 1958 when he set the record for the most wickets in the university's abbreviated season with 80 first-class wickets for under 18 each. He played in the university holidays for Warwickshire with very limited success but in 1959 joined that county full-time, taking 100 wickets in the season though at a rather high cost. He repeated the feat in 1960, but at the end of the season was allowed to leave for Glamorgan, where he was appointed captain in place of Wilf Wooller, who had led the county since 1947.

Wheatley formed a hostile new ball partnership with the Test bowler Jeff Jones for a few seasons and in six years as captain took more than 600 wickets at an average of less than 20 runs per wicket. He retired from the captaincy at the end of the 1966 season, and played only a few matches in 1967. But in 1968 an early season injury to Jones meant that Wheatley returned to play in 16 County Championship matches, bowling with such success that he took 82 wickets at a cost of under 13 runs each and topped the national averages for the season. He was named as a Wisden Cricketer of the Year in the 1969 edition of the almanack.

Wheatley played only a few games in Glamorgan's Championship-winning season of 1969 and retired after one match on the celebratory tour of the West Indies the following winter. In all matches, he took 1,099 wickets at an average of under 21 runs per wicket. He was never allowed higher up the batting order than number ten (alternating in the last two places with Jones), and his career runs only just exceeded his wickets. In 1966 he went nine innings in a row without scoring. His highest score in purely county cricket was only 21, though in a festival match in 1961 for the Gentlemen he hit 34 not out and put on 55 for the tenth wicket with Trevor Bailey.

In retirement, Wheatley remained prominent in cricket administration both at county and national level. He acted as a Test selector for England and chaired Test and County Cricket Board committees, as well as being president of Glamorgan. He was appointed CBE in the 1997 New Year Honours.
