= Leonard Bates =

English cricketer

Len Bates
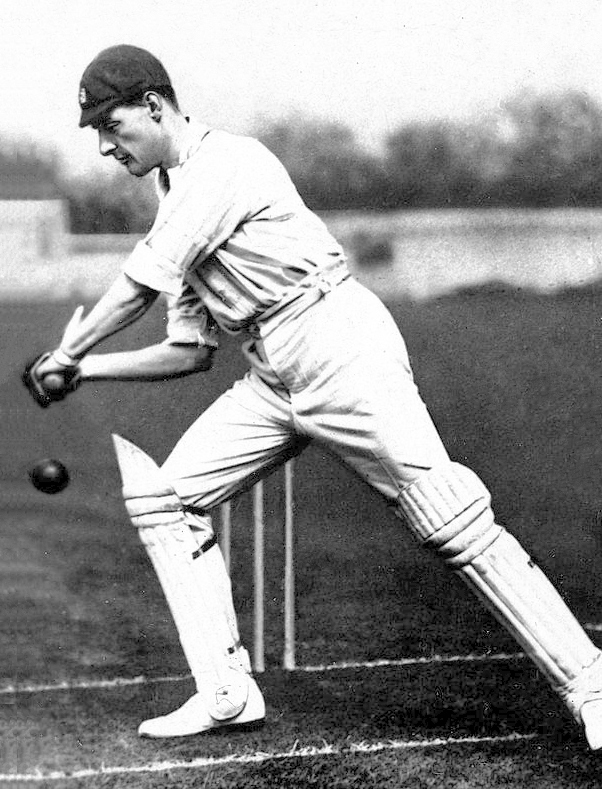

Personal information
- Full name: Leonard Thomas Ashton Bates
- Born: 20 March 1895; Birmingham, Warwickshire, England
- Died: 11 March 1971 (aged 75); Coldwaltham, Sussex, England
- Batting: Right-handed
- Bowling: Right-arm medium-pace

Domestic team information
- Years: Team
- 1913–1935: Warwickshire

Career statistics
Competition	First-class
Matches	444
Runs scored	19,380
Batting average	27.84
100s/50s	21/102
Top score	211
Balls bowled	583
Wickets	9
Bowling average	52.33
5 wickets in innings	0
10 wickets in match	0
Best bowling	2/16
Catches/stumpings	161/0
- Source: Cricket Archive, 2 January 2015

Leonard Thomas Ashton Bates (20 March 1895 – 11 March 1971) was an English cricketer. He was a right-hand batsman and right-arm medium pace bowler who played for Warwickshire.

Born in the pavilion at Edgbaston Cricket Ground where his father, John, was head groundsman, Bates would go on play 200 first-class matches at the ground scoring over 8,000 runs. In total Bates represented his county 441 times between 1913 and 1935, he also made two appearances for 'The Rest' against England in 1927 and once for the Players against Gentlemen in 1925.

Bates scored a total of 19,380 first-class runs at an average of 27.84, passing 1,000 runs in a season 12 times and three times passing 1,500. He scored 21 centuries, two coming against Kent at Coventry in 1927, his highest was a score of 211 against Gloucestershire in 1932.

After retiring as a player in 1935, he fulfilled the role of coach and head groundsman at Christ's Hospital until 1963. He died at Coldwaltham following a long and debilitating illness in which both his legs were amputated.
