= List of people educated at Warwick School =

Former pupils of Warwick School

Former pupils of Warwick School are known as Old Warwickians.

== Notable Old Warwickians ==
Notable Old Warwickians are listed below along with their contribution to society:

=== Politics ===
- Daniel Byles (Guinness World Record holding ocean rower and polar explorer, Conservative MP for North Warwickshire from 2010) 1985 – 1992, Head of House
- Harry Greenway (Conservative MP for Ealing 1979–1997)
- Colin Jordan (National Organiser of the British National Party) 1934 – 1942
- Stephen Lovegrove, Permanent Secretary of the Ministry of Defence
- Frederick Mulley (politician) 1929 – 1936
- Thomas Puckering 1592 – 1636, MP and Sheriff of Warwickshire
- Tim Barrow (British diplomat)
- Daniel Dalton (Conservative politician and former professional cricketer)
- Tony Whittaker, co-founder and first leader of PEOPLE, forerunner of the Green Party
- Tim Cole (British diplomat)

=== Religion ===
- Abiezer Coppe (17th century "ranting" Baptist preacher) c. 1630
- John Ley 1584 – 1662, clergyman and religious controversialist
- Henry Teonge (c. 1620–1690), diarist, naval chaplain and Warwickshire parson
- John Richardson (Archbishop of Fredericton)

=== Sport ===
- A G K Brown (Olympic gold medalist, 1936) head boy, 1933 – 1934
- Tim Dalton English Rugby Union International
- Jamie Elson Member of the winning UK&I Walker Cup Golf Team defeating the US in 2001
- Christian Horner (Team Principal – Red Bull Racing) 1987 – 1992
- Ben Howard (Rugby Union Player – Worcester Warriors)
- Robert Challoner (Australian rugby union player)
- John Hacking (Cricketer for Warwickshire)
- Jack Marshall (Cricketer for Warwickshire)
- Ward Maule (Indian-born English cricketer and clergyman)
- Marko Stanojevic (Italian rugby union player of Serbian descent)
- Chris Whiteside (Cricketer for Middlesex)
- Rob Yates (Cricketer for Warwickshire)
- Fin Smith (Rugby Union Player – Northampton Saints)

=== Entertainment ===
- Sabine Baring-Gould (author of Onward, Christian Soldiers), 1846
- Eric Hope (concert pianist) 1928 – 1931
- Denis Matthews (concert pianist) 1932 – 1936
- Rod Thomas (Musician, Bright Light Bright Light)
- Michael Billington (author, critic & broadcaster)
- John Camkin, (1922–1998) journalist, TV sports presenter and businessman
- Simon Cheshire, (1977–1982) children's writer
- Marc Elliott (actor, EastEnders)
- Charles Piff (alias Charles Kay (Actor)) 1942–1948
- John Masefield (Poet Laureate) 1888 – 1891
- Iain Pears (novelist)
- M J Trow (writer)
- John McLusky (Hector John Dewhirst McLusky) 1936 – 40, James Bond illustrator
- Ben Hanlin (Magician)
- Joshua McGuire (Actor)
- James TW Singer, Songwriter
- Ferdinand Kingsley Actor (Son of Sir Ben Kingsley)
- Edward Chattaway (Journalist and editor of The Star from 1930 to 1936)
- Francis Wilford-Smith (British cartoonist, graphic artist, and producer and archivist of blues music)
- Mark Evans, TV presenter
- Robin Rhoderick-Jones (author)

=== Science ===
- Robert Thomson Leiper, parasitologist and helminthologist
- Josiah Court, English physician who determined the cause of miners' nystagmus
- Alfred Nicholson Leeds, English amateur paleontologist
- Geoff Wilde, British engineer and the designer of the Rolls-Royce RB211

=== Industry ===
- Geoffrey Healey (co-designer, with his father Donald Healey, of Healey and Austin-Healey cars) 1937 – 1939
- William James (railway promoter) c. 1785
- Denys Shortt (Businessman)

=== Military ===
- Air Vice-Marshal Peter J. M. Squires, senior RAF officer
- Peter Strickland (British Lieutenant-General in WWI)
- Brigadier Michael Stephens (Royal Engineers)
- Brigadier Robin Rhoderick-Jones (Queen's Royal Irish Hussars)

=== Other ===
- Sir David Foskett (High Court judge)
- John Owen headmaster c. 1595 – 1622
- Martin Richards, Chief Constable of Sussex Police
- John Patrick Cavanagh Mr Justice Cavanagh (High Court Judge)
