= List of people from Warwick =

This is a list of famous or notable people born in, or associated with, Warwick in England.

In birth order:

- Thomas de Beauchamp, 11th Earl of Warwick (1313–1369), military commander and a founder of the Order of the Garter, was born at Warwick Castle.
- John Rous (c. 1411/20 – 1492), historian and antiquary, was born in Warwick and remained in the vicinity for most of his life.
- Isabel Neville, Duchess of Clarence (1451–1476), wife of the heir presumptive to the English throne, George Plantagenet, 1st Duke of Clarence, was born at Warwick Castle.
- Anne Neville (1456–1485), English royal consort to King Richard III, was born at Warwick Castle.
- Edward Plantagenet, 17th Earl of Warwick (1475–1499), potential claimant to the English throne, was born at Warwick Castle.
- William Parr, 1st Marquess of Northampton (1513–1571), prominent in Edward VI's reign but reprieved from a death sentence for high treason under Mary I, died at Warwick Priory.
- Thomas Fisher (died 1577), politician, was born in Warwick.
- John Fisher (died c. 1590), politician and writer, was Town Clerk of Warwick for 27 years.
- John Ley (1583–1662), cleric and member of the Westminster Assembly of Divines, was born in Warwick and attended its free school.
- Abiezer Coppe (1619–1682), Ranter and religious pamphleteer, was born in Warwick and attended The King's School.
- William Dewsbury (c. 1621 – 1688), early Quaker and religious writer, died in Warwick.
- Sir Robert Vyner (1631–1688), goldsmith, banker and Lord Mayor of London, was born in Warwick.
- Henry Puckering (1638–1664), politician, served as MP for Warwick borough in the first Cavalier Parliament.
- Samuel Dugard (c. 1645 – 1697), cleric and religious writer, was born in Warwick to the headmaster of Warwick Grammar School.
- Francis Smith of Warwick (1672–1738), master-builder and architect, was born in Warwick.
- John Collett Ryland (1723–1792), Baptist preacher and schoolmaster in Warwick
- John Ryland (1753–1825), Baptist preacher and religious writer, was born in Warwick, son of John Collett Ryland, and attended his father's school.
- Henry Homer (1753–1791), classicist, was born in Warwick.
- William Birch (1755–1834), painter, enameller and engraver, was brought up in Warwick.
- William Lambe (1765–1847), physician and pioneer of vegetarianism, was born in Warwick.
- Olivia Serres (self-styled Princess Olive of Cumberland, 1772–1834), painter, writer and imposter, was baptised in Warwick.
- Walter Savage Landor (1775–1864), writer, aphorist and poet, was born in Warwick.
- George Evans (1780–1852), surveyor and explorer of New South Wales, was born in Warwick.
- Robert Eyres Landor (1781–1869), dramatist, poet and cleric, and brother of Walter Savage Landor, was born in Warwick.
- Thomas Taplin Cooke (1782–1866), circus showman, was born in Warwick.
- Josiah Parkes (1793–1871), civil engineer who invented a deep-drainage system, was born in Warwick.
- Joseph Parkes (1796–1865), political reformer and brother of Josiah Parkes, was born in Warwick and attended Warwick Grammar School.
- Herbert Kynaston (1809–1878), English and Latin poet and High Master of St Paul's School, London, was born in Warwick.
- William Holland (1809–1883), stained-glass maker, started his firm in Priory Road.
- Joseph Sugar Baly (1816–1890), entomologist specializing in beetles, was born and died in Warwick.
- George Greville, 4th Earl of Warwick (1818–1893), Tory politician and arms collector, died at Warwick Castle.
- Henry Dunckley (1823–1896), Baptist preacher, journalist and editor, was born in Warwick.
- Sir Josiah Court (1841–1938), physician who explained miners' nystagmus, was born in Warwick and attended King Edward VIII Grammar School.
- Thomas Collins (1841–1934), first-class cricketer, was born in Warwick.
- Harry Drinkwater (1844–1895), architect of churches, pubs etc. in the Oxford area, was born in Warwick.
- Thomas Smith (1846–1925), Australian politician, emigrated from Warwick in 1856.
- Frederick Dickens (1873–1935), first-class cricketer, died in Warwick.
- William Harrison (1875–1937), first-class cricketer and High Sheriff of Staffordshire, was born in Warwick.
- Arthur Henry Mann, a journalist and editor who contributed to the Edward VIII abdication crisis, was born in Warwick.
- Henry Baynton (1892–1951), Shakespearean actor and actor-manager, was born in Warwick.
- Albert Savage (1888 – after 1911), professional footballer with Stoke City F.C., was born in Warwick.
- Farn Carpmael (1908–1988), rower, was born in Warwick.
- Francis Coudrill (1913–1989), ventriloquist and artist, was born in Warwick.
- Jack Marshall (1916–2000), first-class cricketer, died in Warwick.
- Barbara Ansell (1923–2001), physician and founder of paediatric rheumatology, was born in Warwick and educated at King's High School for Girls.
- Philip Bromley (1930–2007), first-class cricketer, died in Warwick.
- Derek Gardner (1931–2011), designer of a transmission system for Formula One cars, was born in Warwick.
- Daphne Fowler (born 1939), TV game show champion ("Britain's best-known female quiz contestant") was born in Warwick.
- Kevin R. Cox (born 1939), geographer and academic, was born in Warwick.
- Stanley Stewart Davis (born 1942), university professor and researcher in pharmacology, was born in Warwick.
- Margaret Harrington (born 1945), Canadian politician, was born in Warwick.
- June Tabor (born 1947), folk singer, was born in Warwick.
- Patrick Ryecart (born 1952), actor, was born in Warwick.
- Paul Goodwin (born 1956), orchestral conductor and oboist, was born in Warwick.
- John Silvester Varley (born 1956), banker and banking executive, was born in Warwick.
- Naomi Phoenix (living), singer-songwriter, was born in Warwick and attended Trinity Catholic School.
- Matty Blair (born 1989), professional footballer with Doncaster Rovers F.C., was born in Warwick.
- Lucy Collett (born 1989), glamour model, was born in Warwick where she attended Myton School.
- Aaron Phillips (born 1993), professional footballer with Northampton Town F.C., was born in Warwick.
- Sophie Turner (born 1996), actress, attended The King's High School for Girls.
- Jessica Carter (born 1997), footballer
