= Warwick School =

Private school in Warwick, Warwickshire, England

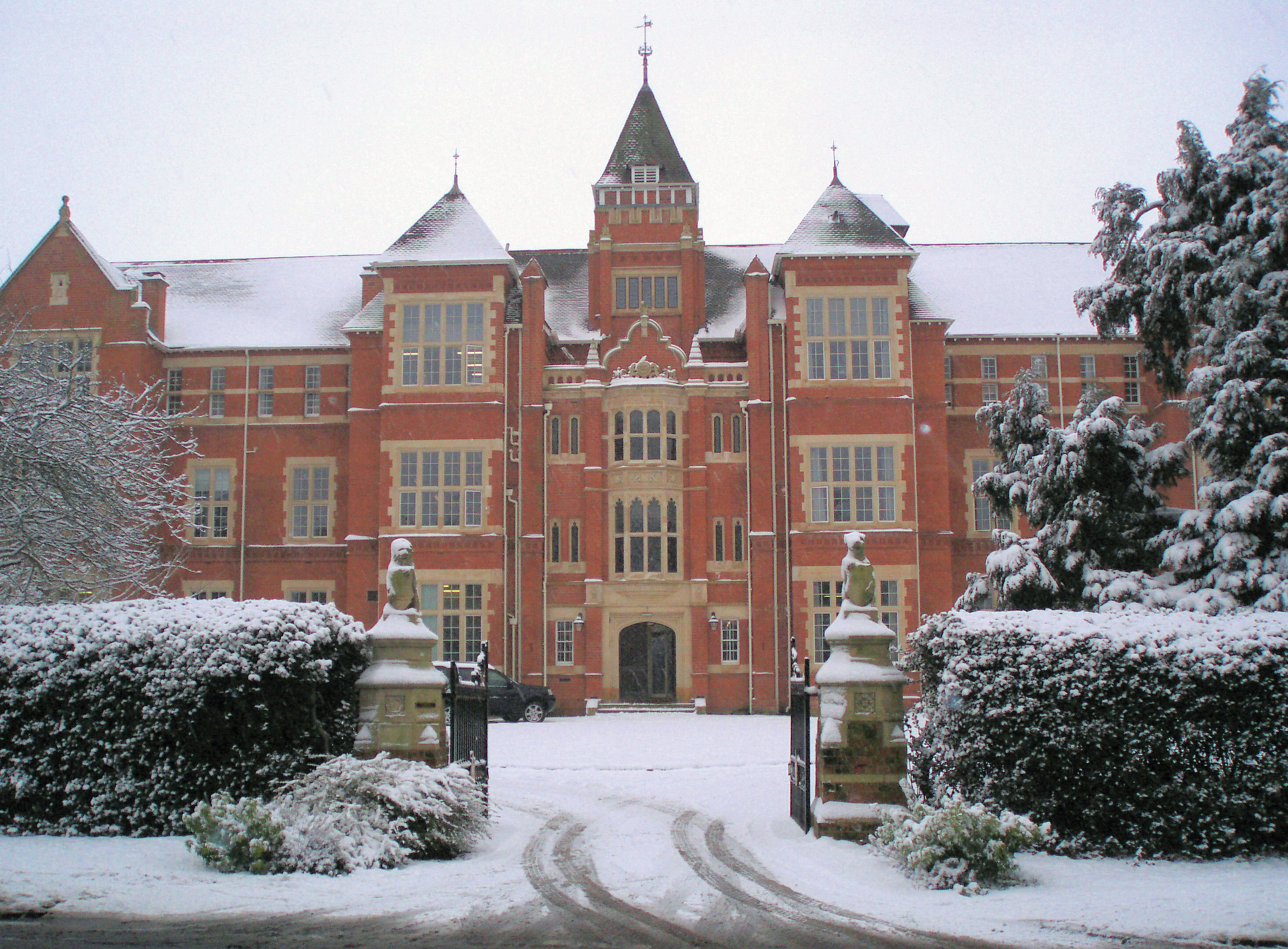

Location
- Warwick, Warwickshire, CV34 6PP; England; 52°16′45″N 1°34′26″W

Information
- Type: Public school Private day and boarding school
- Motto: Altiora Peto (Latin) (I seek higher things)
- Religious affiliation: Church of England
- Established: 914; 1112 years ago
- Founder: Æthelflæd of Mercia
- Department for Education URN: 125781 Tables
- Chairman of Governors: A. C. Firth
- Head Master: J. S. Barker, BA (Senior School); A. Hymer, MAEd (Junior School)
- Deputy Headmaster: K. Wyatt (Senior School); T. Wurr, BA (Junior School)
- Staff: ca.130
- Gender: Boys
- Age: 7 to 18
- Enrolment: 1245
- Alumni: Old Warwickians
- Colours: (Sports) Blue and White (Old Warwickians) Maroon, Black and White
- Website: www.warwickschool.org

Warwick School is a British private school (independent boarding and day school) for boys, in the market town of Warwick, in Warwickshire, England.

Known as King's School, Warwick until around 1900, it is believed to have been founded by Æthelflæd of Mercia in 914 AD, making it the fifth-oldest surviving school in England, after King's School, Canterbury; King's School, Rochester; St Peter's School, York; and Wells Cathedral School. Its headmasters have been members of the Headmasters' and Headmistresses' Conference since 1896.

The school is part of the Warwick Independent Schools Foundation, which also owns The King's High School for Girls and Warwick Preparatory School.

== History ==
=== Early beginnings and the move to St Mary's ===
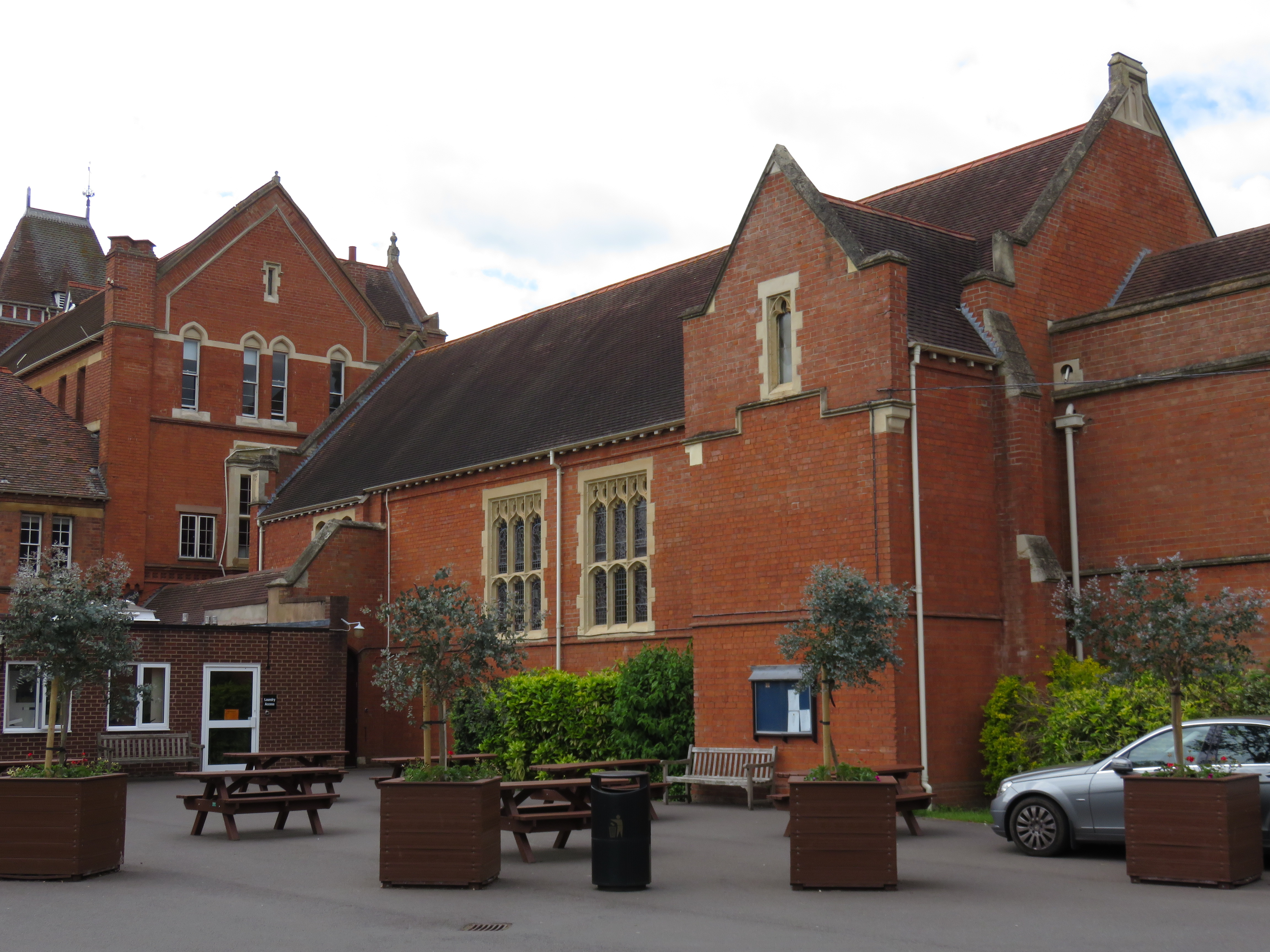
The chapel of 1879, from Chapel Quad

The town of Warwick was first recorded in the 9th and 10th century Anglo-Saxon Chronicle in 914 during the rule of Æthelflæd, daughter of Alfred the Great. Warwick School was active in the time of King Edward the Confessor (1042–1066) and probably for at least a century earlier, most likely in the grounds of Warwick Castle. By 1477 lessons were held in the old church of St John the Baptist in the Market Place. In 1545 King Henry VIII re-founded the school as "The King's New Scole of Warwyke" and the new grammar school moved to what is now the Lord Leycester Hospital. Later it moved again to St Peter's Chapel, now part of King's High School. Schoolmasters in the 17th century included the epigrammatist John Owen (1595–1622) and Rev Thomas DuGard (1633–49), later Rector of Barford Church, who recorded the history and daily life of the school in his Latin diary. Around 1697 the school moved to the disused medieval buildings of the Vicars Choral in St Mary's churchyard, and stayed there for the next 200 years.

=== Victorian era: growth followed by crisis ===
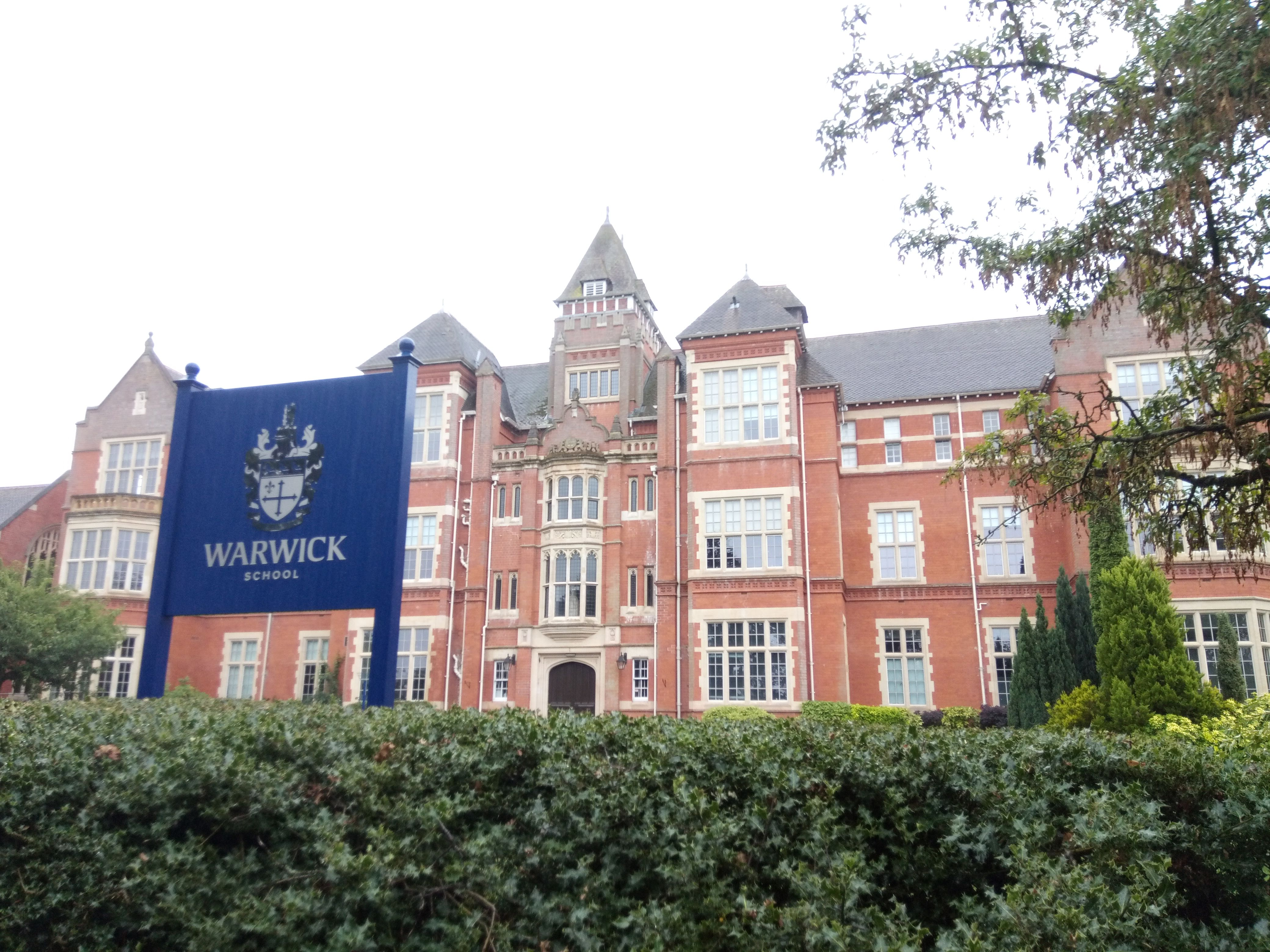
The 1878 façade of the school

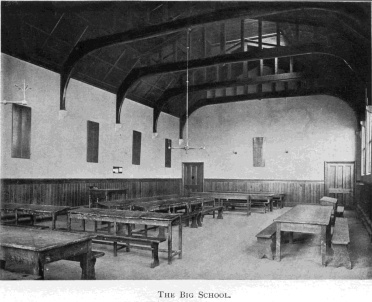
Big School in 1900

In the Victorian era, the Rev. Herbert Hill, who was headmaster from 1842 to 1876, implemented several educational reforms and a modern curriculum was introduced. Three new schools were proposed in the 1870s, and had all begun operations by 1879: The King's Grammar School, on a new site south of the River Avon, with a classical curriculum; The King's Middle School in The Butts, providing a "commercial education" for "less academic" boys; and King's High School, in Landor House, Smith Street. The Junior Department (now the Junior School) opened in 1889. In 1887 "The Limes" (16 lime trees) were planted to mark Queen Victoria's Golden Jubilee.

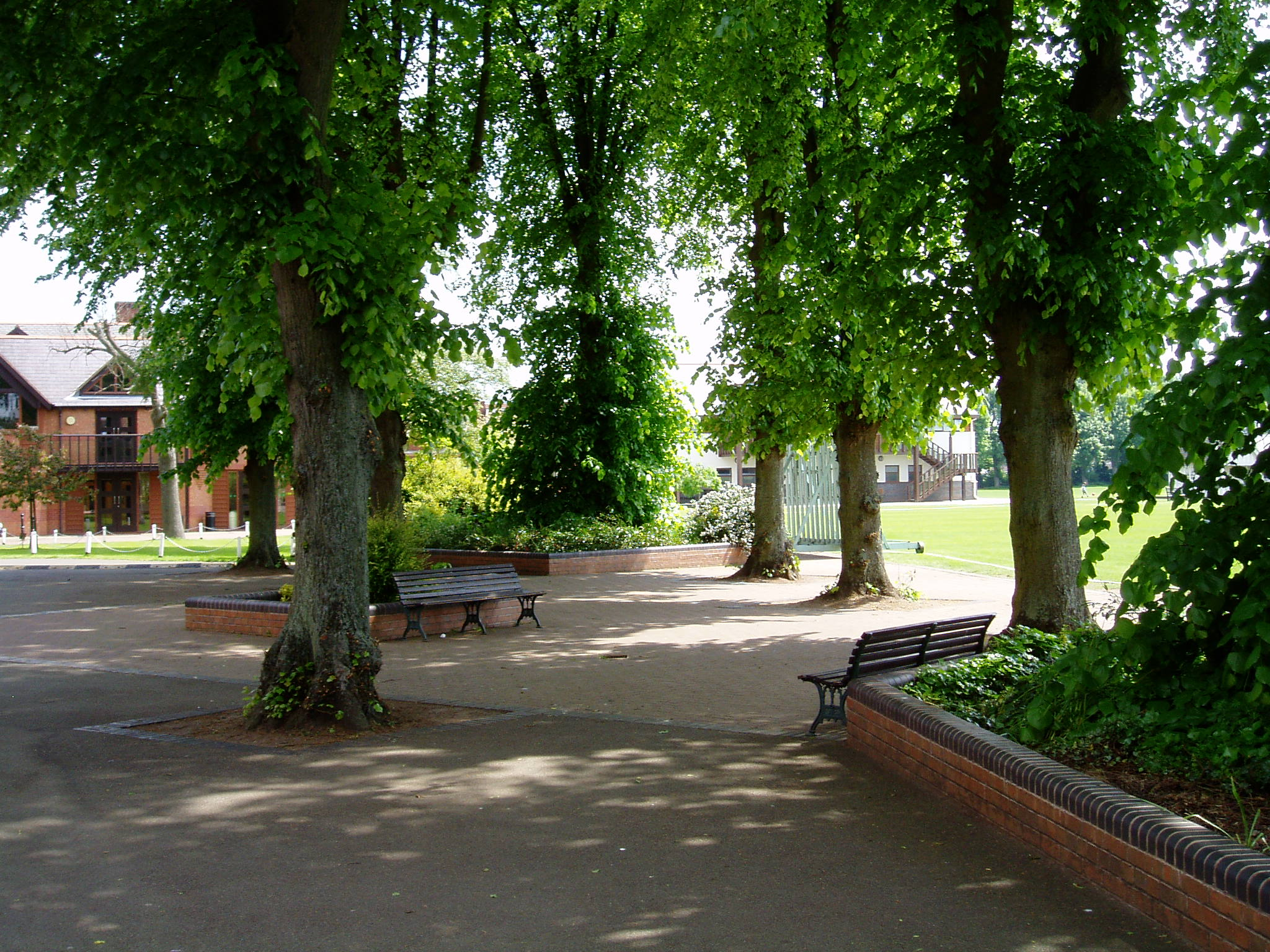
The Limes, planted in 1887

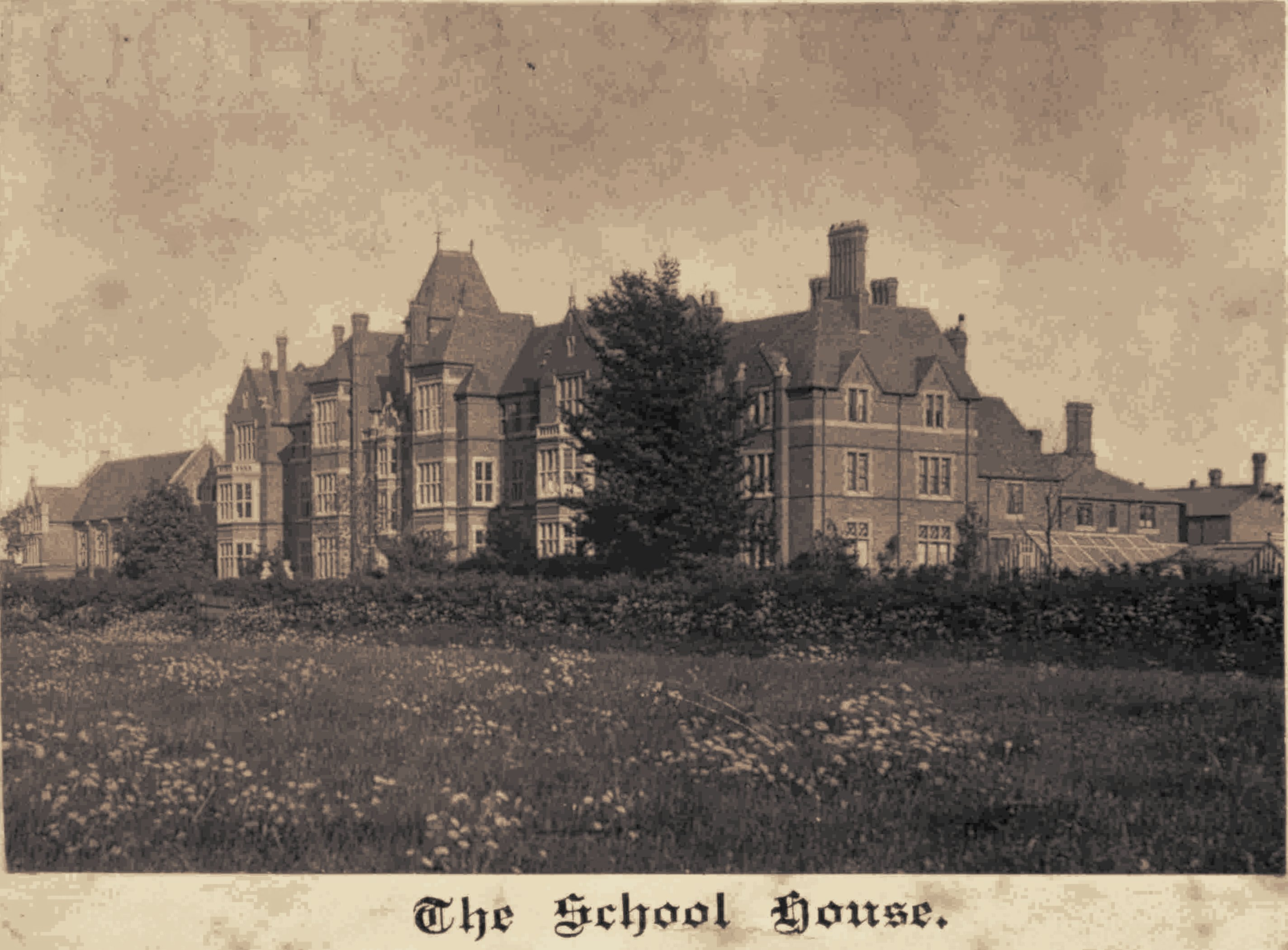
The new school, about 1890

The years 1896 to 1906 were ones of increasing crisis for the school, however, culminating in its economic collapse and temporary closure, the flight of the headmaster, the sacking of all the staff and the withdrawal of most of the boys. In 1906, the grammar school merged with the King's Middle School.

=== The World Wars and independence ===
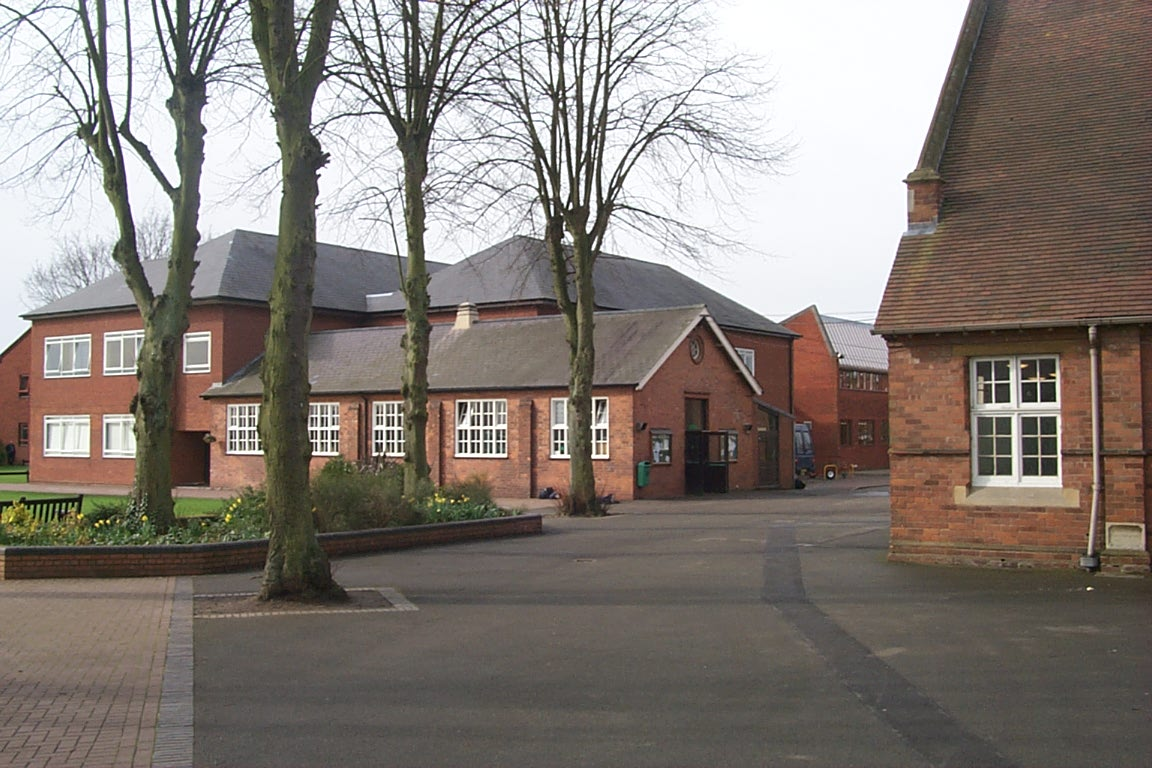
The Engineering Block, 1910

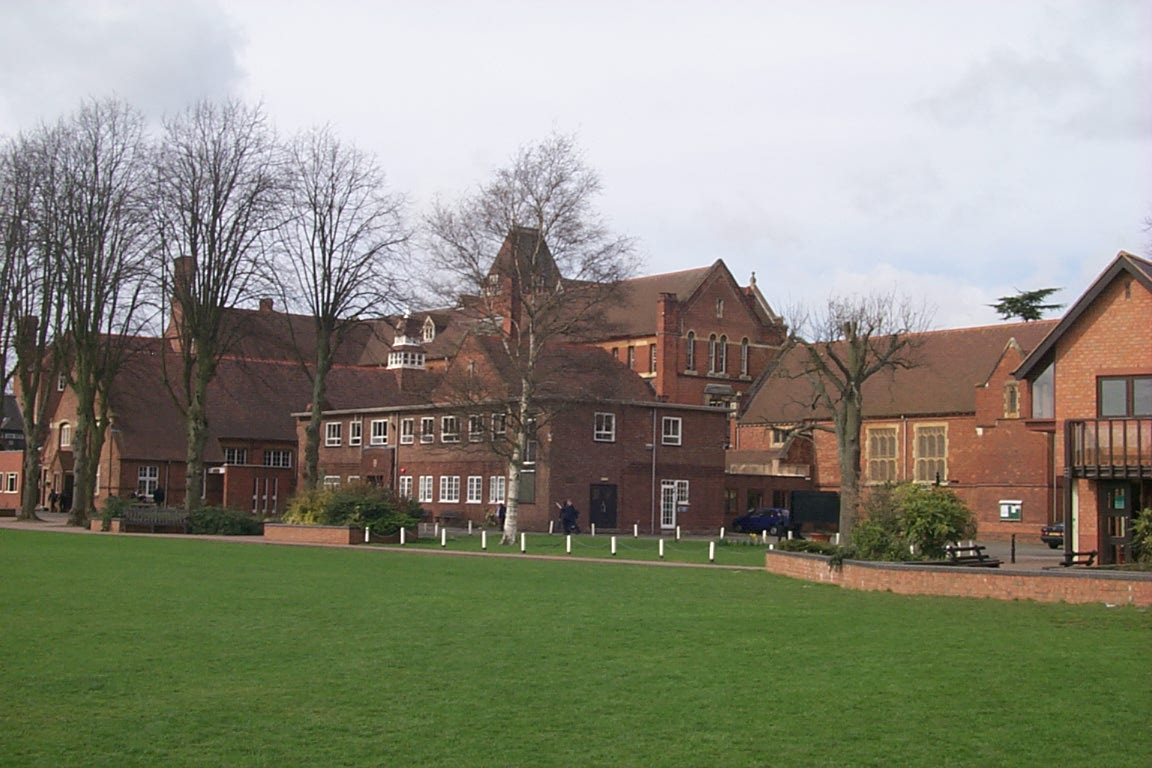
The main buildings

Under the physicist H. S. Pyne, headmaster from 1906 to 1928, the school rapidly grew in numbers. By the late 1920s, there were almost 400 boys in the school, including 146 boarders, almost double the planned number.

In the First World War, eighty-eight old Warwickians, including Pyne's son, were killed, as well as two former schoolmasters. Pyne paid for the chapel gallery and west window as a war memorial.

The new headmaster appointed in 1928, G. A. Riding, previously a housemaster at Rugby School, saw himself as a "new broom sweeping clean", after the school had undergone some decline. His time in charge was controversial and was marred by two arson attacks in 1930. In 1933, he was succeeded by Eric Percival Smith, who also did not stay long, leaving in 1936.

Headmaster A. H. B. Bishop served the school from 1936 to 1962. During the Second World War, the number of boys grew, increasing to 450 by 1946. It was difficult to appoint and retain adequate staff, and between 1939 and 1940 the school was forced to share its premises with a school evacuated from Birmingham.

The Butler Education Act was enacted in 1944, and one of its effects was to put an end to the substantial Local Education Authority subsidy to the school. In 1946, the school became private.

=== Late 20th Century stability ===
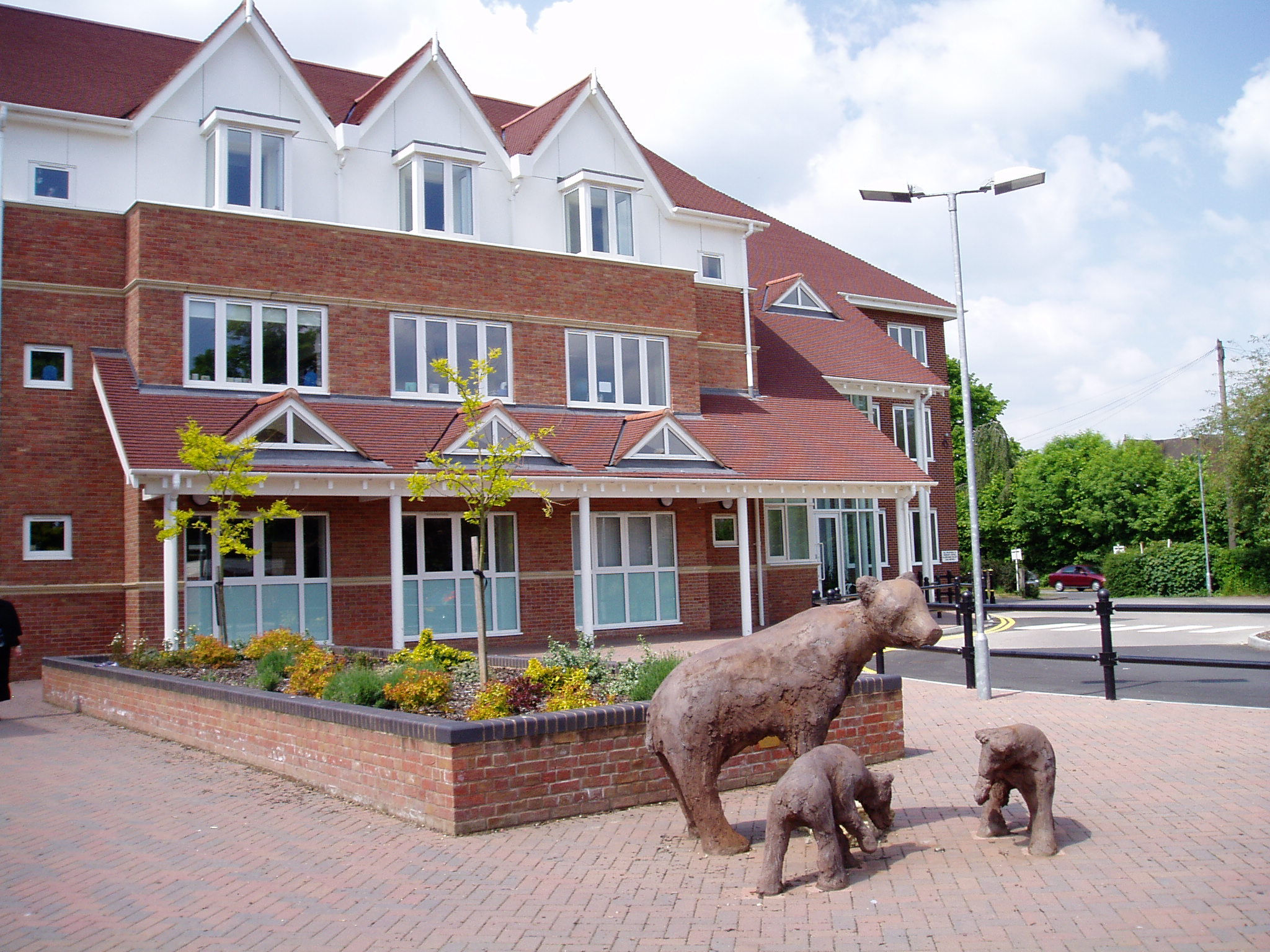
The Junior School

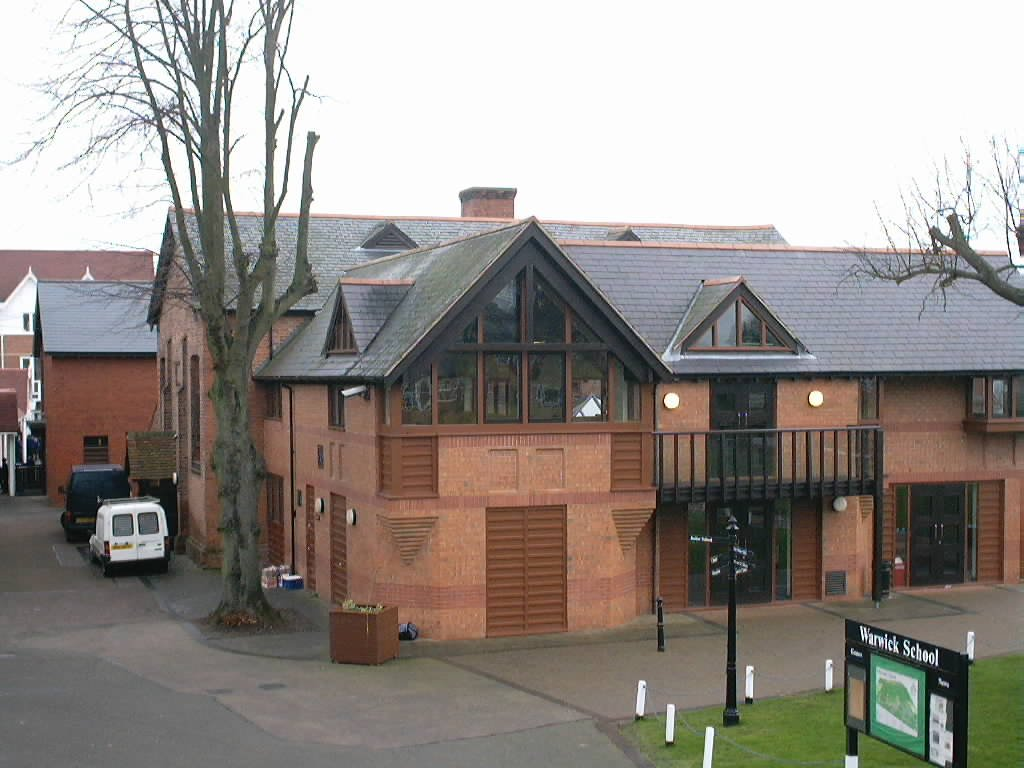
Wellbeing and Aspire Hub (Previously Sixth Form Centre and Uniform Shop)

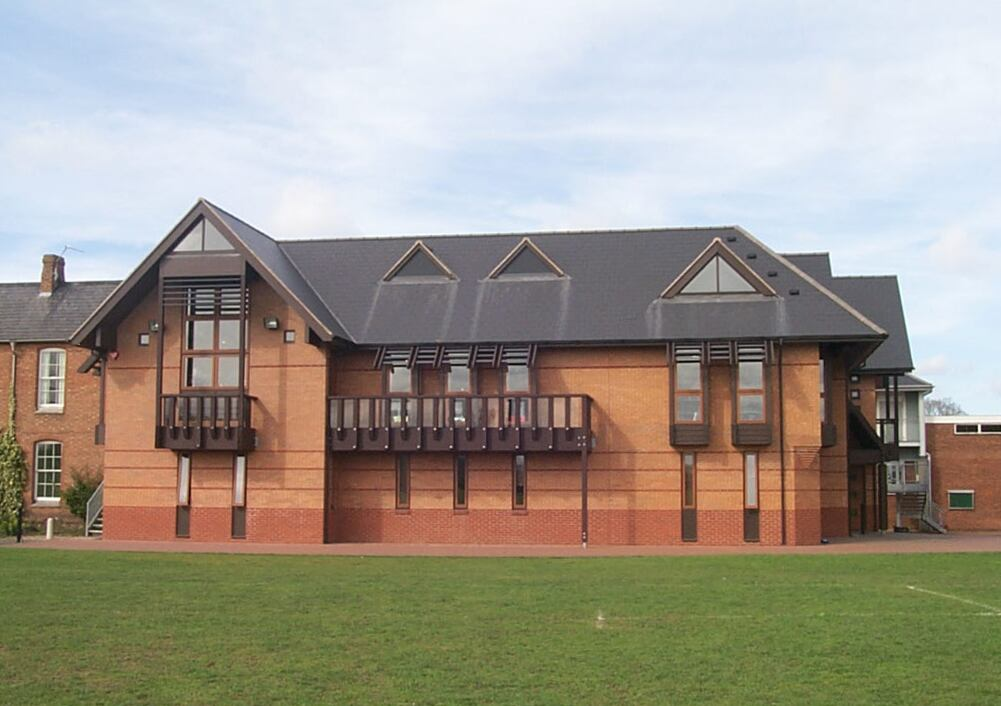
Masefield Centre (library and IT)

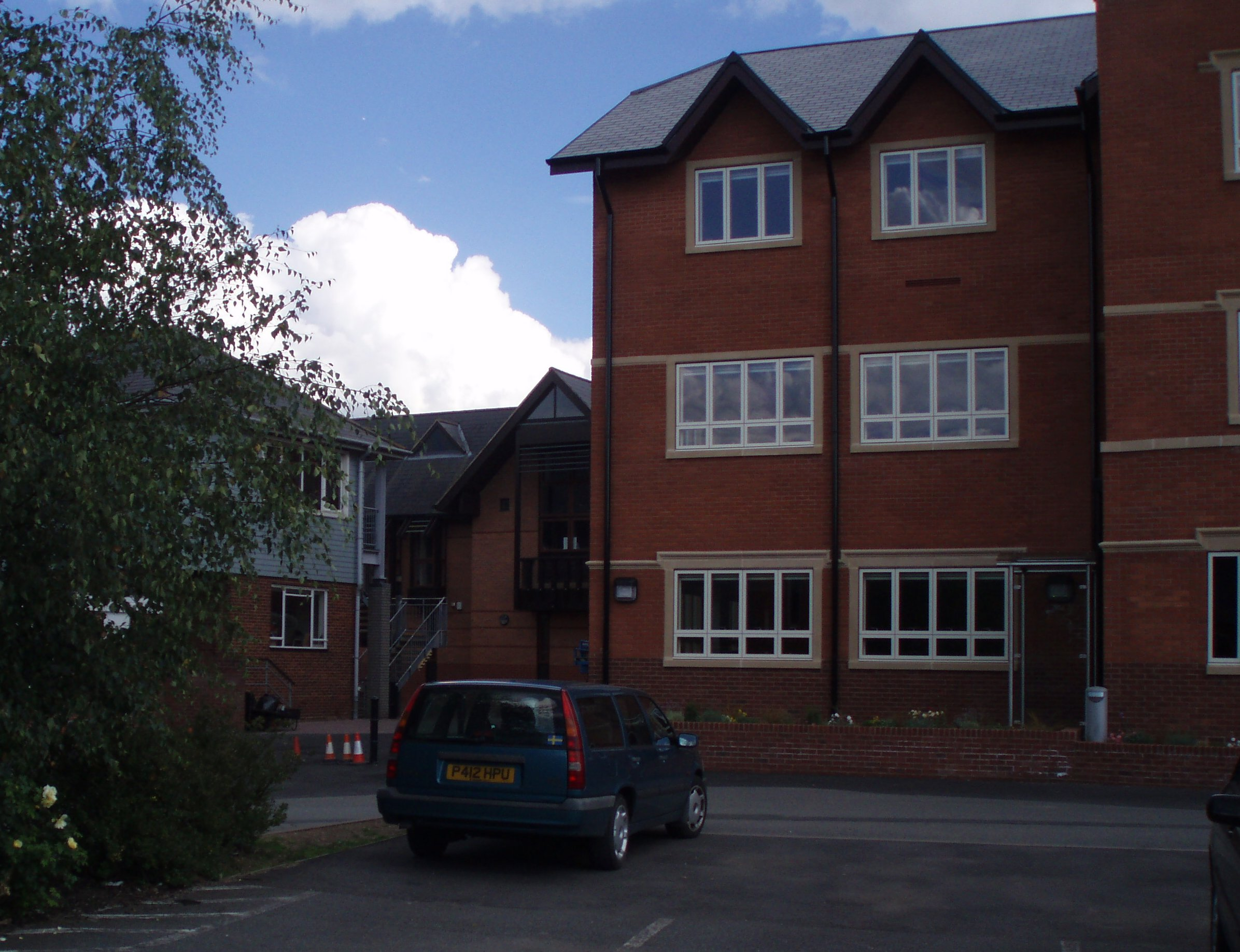
The new Science Centre

By 1962, there were 742 pupils and 44 staff in the senior and junior schools combined. Recognition for the school included a visit by Queen Elizabeth the Queen Mother in 1958, as well as earlier visits by Viscount Montgomery of Alamein and Sir Anthony Eden (PM between 1955–1957).

Notable modernisation efforts were undertaken by the headmasters P. W. Martin (1962–1977) and Dr P. J. Cheshire (1988–2002), who both extensively improved the school's buildings and facilities. All teaching in the original 1879 classrooms finished, and a museum and functions room were opened, named the Portcullis Room. In 1995, the school roll reached 1,000 pupils for the first time.

In the 2000s, Sixth form girls from the King's High School were allowed to participate in certain school activities, and some joint teaching started. The school's rugby team won the Daily Mail Cup in 2007, and the school's concert band and drama students received national recognition.

Two histories of the school have been published: History of Warwick School by A. F. Leach (1906) and Warwick School, A History by G. N. Frykman and E. J. Hadley (2004). Gervald Frykman was the school's first Archivist, and Eric Hadley edited the school's yearly chronicle The Portcullis. A second edition of Frykman and Hadley was published in 2014, to commemorate the assumed 1,100th anniversary of the foundation of the school.

== Modern buildings ==
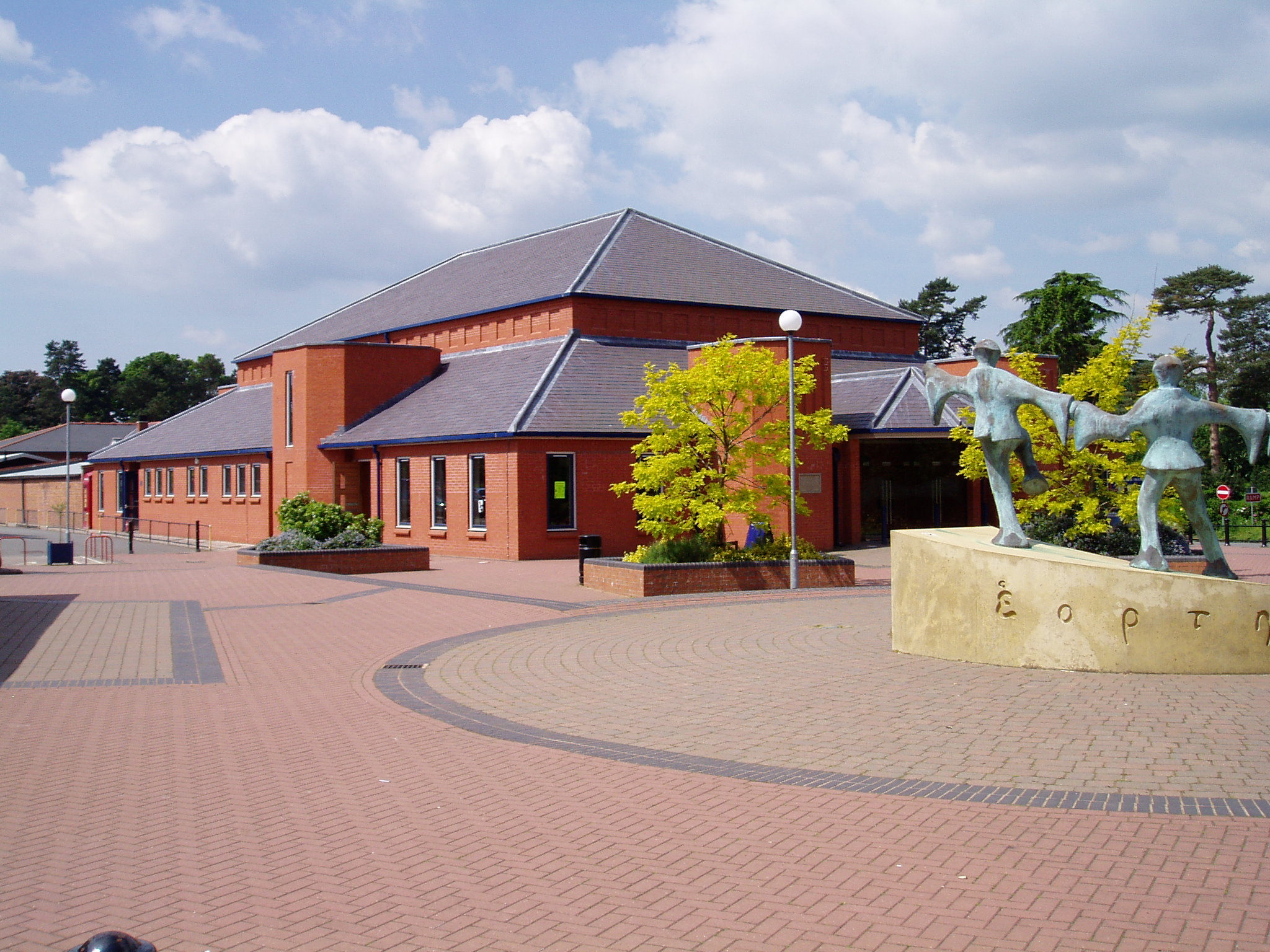
The Bridge House Theatre

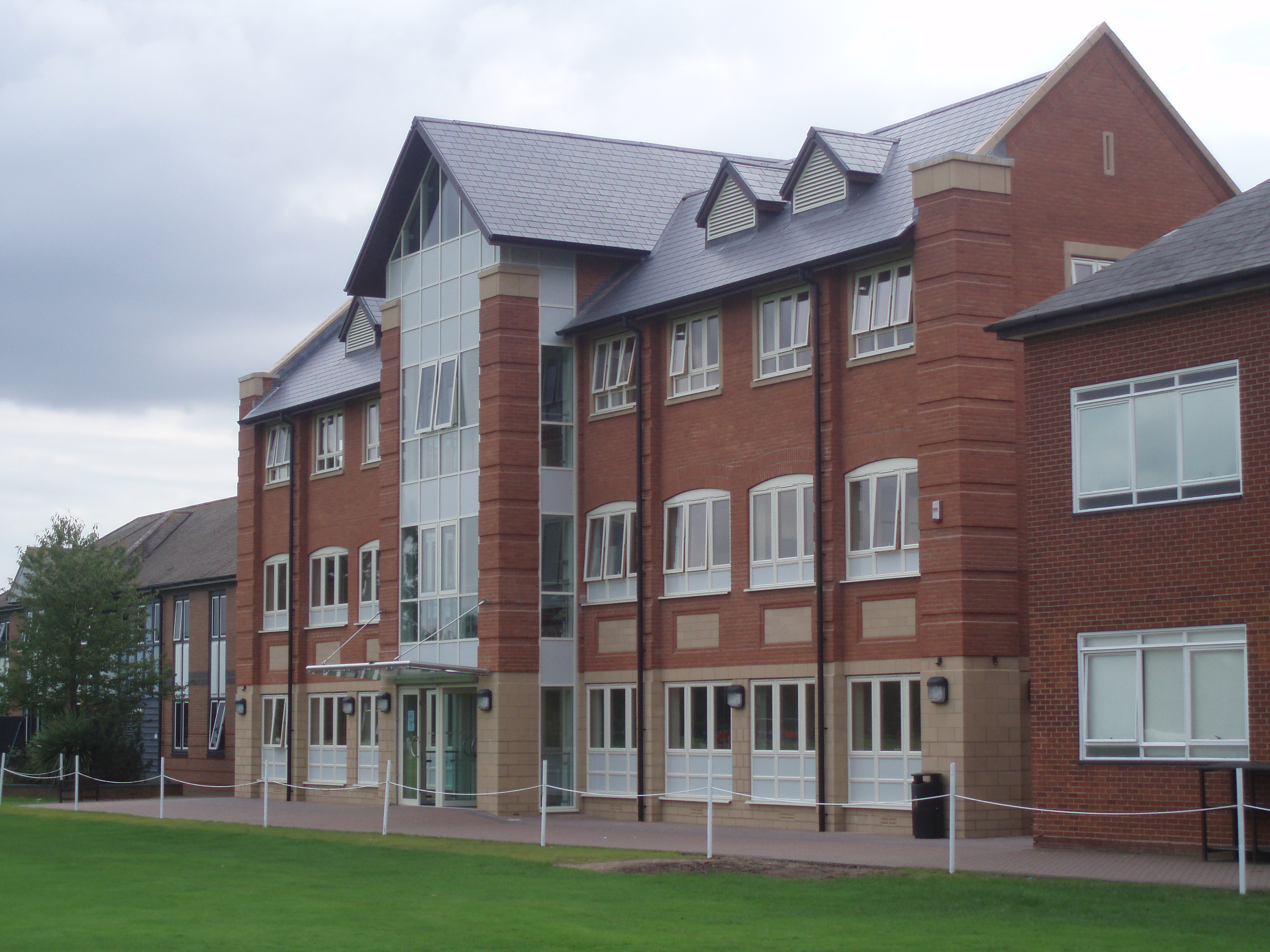
Thornton Building of 2008

Although the 1879 buildings are still in use, there have been many additions. All teaching now takes place in specialised departmental areas.

The Junior School, opened in 1889, is next to the main school. Although it closed and re-opened several times in the first half of the twentieth century, it has been fully operational since 1938. In 2006 it catered for over 240 boys from 7 to 11 years of age, the majority of whom were expected to pass into the senior school.

A new Science Centre, designed by Brown Matthews Architects Ltd., opened in June 2007. It houses biology, physics and chemistry laboratories. It was built on the site of the original 1879 sanatorium.

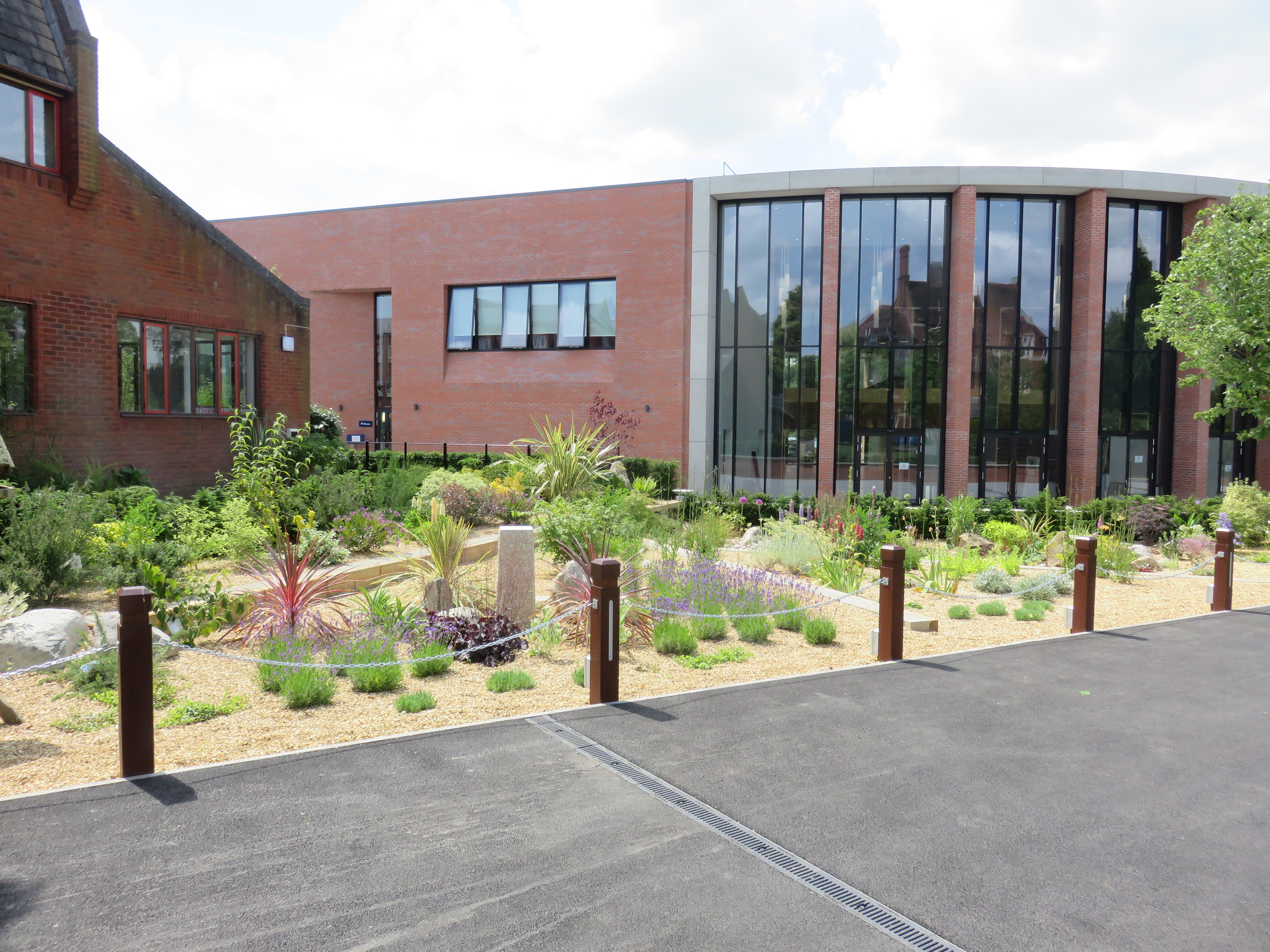
Warwick Hall, built in 2016

The former main hall of the school, the Guy Nelson Hall, was built, following an appeal, between 1969 and 1970, and was named after Alderman Guy Nelson, a long-serving Chairman of Governors, in office from 1938 to 1963. It had seating for about 600 people, but by 2010 this was much less than the total size of the school, with the result that a new building was planned. The hall was demolished in 2015 and was replaced by a much larger one, Warwick Hall, opened in September 2016 by Sir Michael Attenborough.

The school's theatre, called the Bridge House Theatre, has seating for around 310 people. Intended from the outset to be used both by the school and by local organisations in the town, it was designed by Michael Reardon Associates and was opened on 1 May 2000 by Dame Judi Dench.

In March 2013, the revamped and modernised Sports Pavilion, renamed the Halse Sports Pavilion after former headmaster Edward B. Halse (2002–2013), was opened in a ceremony led by the politician and former track and field athlete Sebastian Coe. On 2 June 2014, as the climax of the Jubilee year, Charles, Prince of Wales, visited the school and unveiled a commemorative plaque.

== Entrance ==
Entrance to Warwick School is competitive, with admissions judged by a combination of internal exams and interview for both the junior and senior schools. Entry to the senior school is permitted at 11+, 13+ and Sixth form (or Upper School). For the Upper School, at age 16, admissions are judged by subject-specific exams and interviews and offers are conditional upon GCSE and IGCSE results.

In 2019–20 there were 969 boys in the senior school (aged 11 to 18), and 250 in the junior school (aged 7 to 11).

In 2023, 66% achieved 9-7 in the GCSEs, while 48% achieved A*/A in A-levels.

== Houses ==
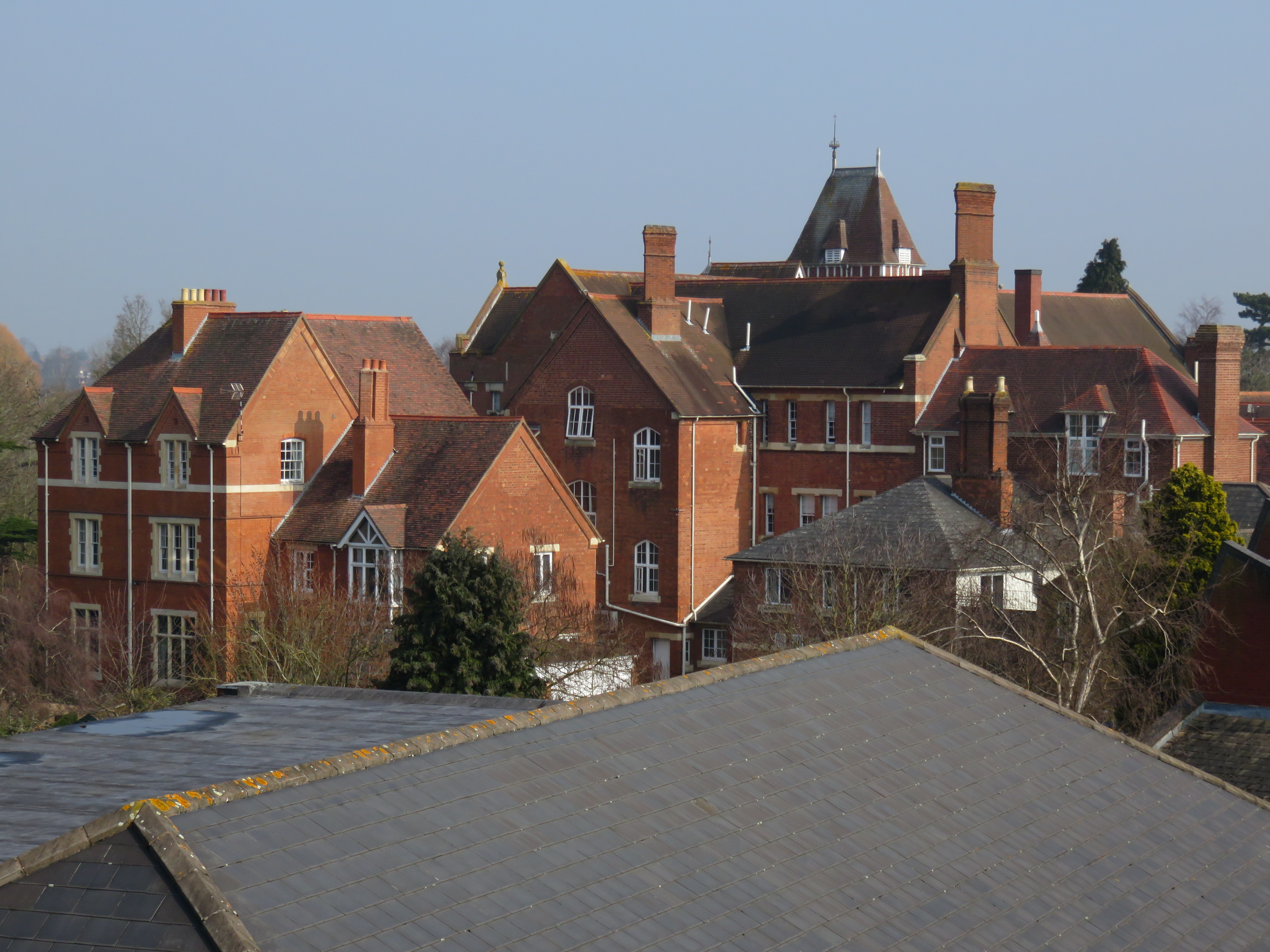
The buildings of 1879, in 2015

Boys in the senior school are assigned to one of six houses which compete against each other in sports and other activities, such as debating. The six houses are named after people connected with the history of the town of Warwick (Tudor, Guy, Greville, Brooke, Oken, and Leycester). The school's two boarding houses, Way House and School House, are separate from the main house system, with boarders being members of both a boarding house and one of the six main houses.

House	Namesake	House Colours
Guy	Guy of Warwick	Magenta
Brooke	Earl Brooke	Red
Greville	Earl of Warwick	Green
Leycester	Lord Leycester	Blue
Oken	Thomas Oken	Black and Silver
Tudor	Henry VIII	Gold

The Junior School previously had four houses named after historical figures with no special connection to Warwick (Drake, Scott, Wellington, and Nelson). These were renamed to Terra, Ventis, Ignis, and Aqua.

== Traditions ==
=== Visit of the Town Crier ===
The Town Crier of Warwick traditionally visits the school to announce an added week of holiday for the Michaelmas half term. The ceremony involves a speech, read from a parchment to the whole school in the chapel quad, a mock discussion with the headmaster, and the declaration of the holiday, to cheers from the boys. The Town Crier then takes up a collection for charity from the pupils and staff. This tradition is believed to date back to at least 1912.

== The School Arms ==
Coat of arms of Warwick School
Notes Granted 7 September 1931. Crest On a wreath Or and Gules, upon a portcullis chained Or a bear erect Argent muzzled Gules supporting a ragged staff also Argent. Escutcheon Gules, a cross flory in the first quarter a Fleur-de-lys Or, on a chief of the second three martlets Azure. Motto 'Altiora Peto'

The Rev. John Pearce Way, headmaster from 1885 to 1896, was the first to attempt to draw up a school coat of arms. He also commissioned the first written history of the school, attempted to change its name from The King's School, Warwick, to Warwick School, and introduced a school song and a school motto. He succeeded with the school motto, Altiora Peto (I seek higher things), introduced in 1893, but neither the name change nor the coat of arms were legally established.

Horace Seymour Pyne, headmaster from 1906 to 1928, also attempted to create a coat of arms – again irregularly, without a grant from the College of Arms – and caused it to be incorporated into the stained glass window of the chapel, where it remains.

George Riding, headmaster from 1928 to 1933, eventually took the appropriate legal steps to obtain a coat of arms, which was granted to Warwick School in 1931. Riding designed the coat of arms, which is blazoned (described heraldically) as follows:

- Arms: Gules, a cross flory in the first quarter a Fleur-de-lys Or, on a chief of the second three martlets Azure.
- Crest: On a wreath Or and Gules, upon a portcullis chained Or a bear erect Argent muzzled Gules supporting a ragged staff also Argent.
- Motto: Altiora Peto (I seek higher things)

The three azure (blue) martlets are heraldic swallows, depicted without feet because of a medieval belief that they could not perch on the ground. Like the large golden cross, they are emblems used by King Edward the Confessor, reputed to be one of the original founders of the school. The gold fleur-de-lys and portcullis are emblems of King Henry VIII, who re-founded the school in 1545, and the Bear and Ragged Staff have been the crest of the family of the Earl of Warwick since at least the 14th century.

== Uniform ==
In the 1920s the uniform at Warwick School was simple: clothing was expected to be black, although trousers were also allowed to be grey and neckties dark blue. Boys below a certain height (5'6", or 1.68m) were required to wear the unpopular and uncomfortable Eton collar. In the 1930s the current uniform was introduced: a navy blue blazer, worn with a white shirt (or grey in junior school), black or charcoal trousers (with shorts for Junior School), and a tie. Sixth form dress is a dark grey or navy suit.

== School magazines ==
The Portcullis, The Warwickian, and The Free Press are the official school magazines, the first having been in print since the late 19th century. All three are contributed to by the boys of the school, with the latter having a tradition of mocking and satirising school policies and teacher. The Portcullis is printed yearly, and The Warwickian termly. Individual subjects also have their own publications, including The Scientist (Science) and Generation Rising (English).

== Head Masters ==
- 1792–1842: Rev. George Innes
- 1843–1876: Rev. Herbert Hill
- 1876–1880: Rev. William Fisher MacMichael
- 1881–1885: Rev. William Grundy
- 1885: Rev. Philip Raynor (interregnum)
- 1885–1896: Rev. John Pearce Way DD
- 1896–1902: Rev. Robert Percival Brown
- 1903–1906: Rev. William Theodore Keeling
- 1906–1928: Horace Seymour Pyne
- 1928–1933: George A. Riding
- 1933–1936: Eric Percival Smith
- 1936–1962: Arthur H. B. Bishop
- 1962–1977: Patrick W. Martin
- 1977–1988: John A. Strover
- 1988–2002: Dr Philip J. Cheshire
- 2002–2013: Edward B. Halse
- 2013–2018: Augustus R. Lock
- 2018–2020: Dr Deneal A. Smith
- 2020–Present: James S. Barker

== Notable alumni ==
=== Politics and public life ===
- Daniel Byles: Guinness World Record holding ocean rower and polar explorer, Conservative MP for North Warwickshire 2010–2015. Head of House 1985 – 1992
- Harry Greenway: Conservative MP for Ealing until 1997
- Colin Jordan: National Organiser of the British National Party
- Sir Stephen Lovegrove: UK National Security Adviser
- Frederick, Lord Mulley: Secretary of State for Defence, later Secretary of State for Education and Science
- Sir Thomas Puckering: MP and Sheriff of Warwickshire
- Sir Tim Barrow: British diplomat
- Daniel Dalton: Conservative politician and former professional cricketer
- Tony Whittaker: co-founder and first leader of PEOPLE, forerunner of the Green Party
- Joseph Parkes: Political reformer

=== Religion ===
- Abiezer Coppe: 17th-century "ranting" Baptist preacher
- John Ley: clergyman and religious controversialist
- Henry Teonge: diarist, naval chaplain and Warwickshire parson
- John Richardson: Archbishop of Fredericton
- Samuel Dugard: Anglican Divine
- John Ryland: Baptist minister

=== Sport ===
- A. G. K. Brown: Olympic gold medallist 1936, head boy 1933 – 1934
- Jamie Elson: member of the winning UK&I Walker Cup Golf Team defeating the US in 2001
- Christian Horner: Motorsport executive and racing driver
- Ben Howard: Rugby Union Player – Worcester Warriors
- Robert Challoner: Australian rugby union player
- Tim Dalton: English Rugby Union International
- John Hacking: cricketer for Warwickshire
- Jack Marshall: cricketer for Warwickshire
- Ward Maule: cricketer and clergyman
- Marko Stanojevic: Italian rugby union player
- Chris Whiteside: cricketer for Middlesex
- Sidney Nelson Crowther: Rugby union international
- Paul Ramage: cricketer and later a head master
- Jamie Shillcock: Worcester Warriors rugby player
- Geoffrey Tedstone: cricketer for Warwickshire and Gloucestershire
- Nick David: Worcester Warriors rugby player
- Tom Dodd: Worcester Warriors rugby player
- Rob Yates: cricketer for Warwickshire
- Fin Smith: Northampton Saints rugby player

=== Entertainment ===
- Sabine Baring-Gould: author of Onward, Christian Soldiers
- Ben Hanlin: magician and television presenter
- Eric Hope: concert pianist
- Denis Matthews: concert pianist
- Rod Thomas: musician, Bright Light Bright Light
- Michael Billington: author, critic & broadcaster
- John Camkin: journalist, TV sports presenter and businessman
- Simon Cheshire: novelist (as Richard Gadz)
- Marc Elliott: actor, EastEnders
- Charles Piff (alias Charles Kay): Actor
- John Masefield: Poet Laureate
- Iain Pears: novelist
- M. J. Trow: writer
- Henry Baynton: actor
- John McLusky: James Bond illustrator
- Joshua McGuire: actor
- James TW: singer/songwriter
- Ferdinand Kingsley: actor (son of Sir Ben Kingsley)
- Edward Chattaway: journalist and editor of The Star from 1930 to 1936
- Francis Wilford-Smith: cartoonist, graphic artist, and producer and archivist of blues music
- Mark Evans: TV Presenter

=== Science ===
- Robert Thomson Leiper
- Josiah Court: English physician who determined the cause of miners' nystagmus
- Alfred Nicholson Leeds
- Geoff Wilde: designer of the Rolls-Royce RB211
- Cyril Burt: controversial psychologist known for studies on IQ hereditability

=== Industry ===
- Geoffrey Healey: co-designer, with his father Donald Healey, of Healey and Austin-Healey cars
- William James: promoter of rail transport
- Denys Shortt: businessman

=== Military ===
- Air Vice Marshall Peter J. M. Squires
- Lieutenant-General Peter Strickland

=== Other ===
- Sir David Foskett: High Court judge
- John Owen: headmaster c. 1595 – 1622
- Martin Richards: Chief Constable of Sussex Police
- Sir Robert Vyner: Lord Mayor of London

== Notable current and former teachers ==
- John Collett Ryland: Baptist minister
- Alex Burghart: Member of Parliament for Brentwood and Ongar
- Jane Gurnett: actress and current part-time drama teacher
- Geoffrey Tedstone: Former professional cricketer and sports teacher
- Simon Francis: Former professional cricket and current director of cricket

== See also ==
- List of the oldest schools in the United Kingdom
- List of the oldest schools in the world
