= Eric John Holborow =

British physician and immunologist (1918–2009)

- Born: 20 March 1918; Amesbury, Wiltshire
- Died: 3 February 2009 (aged 90); Ashford, Kent
- Occupations: Physician and immunologist
- Known for: first description of autoantibodies to smooth muscle

Eric John Holborow FRCP (20 March 1918 – 3 February 2009) was a British physician, rheumatologist, and immunologist, known for his pioneering research on autoimmunity.

After education at Epsom College, Eric John Holborow, known as "John" or "EJ", studied medicine at Clare College, Cambridge and St Bartholomew's Hospital, graduating in 1942 MB BChir (Cantab.). In 1942 immediately after qualifying MRCS, LRCP, he joined the RAMC and served (under the command of John Vivian Dacie from 1943 to 1946) in Egypt. Holborow in 1947 joined the Royal Postgraduate Medical School's department of haematology (where Dacie was a senior lecturer) and in 1953 graduated MD.

In 1953 Holborow joined the scientific staff of the MRC Rheumatism Research Unit at the Canadian Red Cross Memorial Hospital in Taplow, Buckinghamshire. He eventually became the director of the Rheumatism Research Unit and worked there until the Unit was closed in 1976.

While he was there he was particularly involved in perfecting the new technique of using immunoflourescence to define autoantibodies in many diseases, providing much of the basis for modern diagnostics. With his colleagues, he was the first to describe smooth muscle reactive autoantibodies and this led the way to important immunological discoveries in the fields of liver disease, viral infections and neoplasia. While there he made a point of developing activities for the children hospitalised through arthritis.

With Leonard Glynn, he was one of the first scientists to explore the contribution of autoimmunity to rheumatic fever, inflammatory arthritis and systemic CTDs in patients and animal models of autoimmune disease, and with his clinical collaborators, Eric Bywaters and Barbara Ansell, he created a model centre for the scientific basis of investigating patients with rheumatic diseases.

He was in 1956 a founder member of the British Society for Immunology and in 1959 became the Society's second secretary.

Together with Leonard Glynn ... he published Autoimmunity and disease (Oxford, Blackwell, 1965) which was regarded as a landmark text in the field and has been described as ‘a model of scientific writing’. He also wrote An ABC of modern immunology (London, Lancet Ltd, 1968).

In 1976 the Arthritis and Rheumatism Campaign set up the Bone and Joint Research Unit at the London Hospital Medical College (LHMC) in Whitechapel. Holborow was appointed the head of the Bone and Joint Research Unit and was given a professorial chair in immunopathology. He was a co-editor for The Journal of Immunological Methods and a co-editor with William Gordon Reeves of two editions of Immunology in Medicine: A Comprehensive Guide to Clinical Immunology (London, Academic Press, 1977, 1983). Holborow was elected FRCP in 1978 and was the Bradshaw Lecturer in 1982. He retired in 1983.

He married in 1943. Upon his death in 2009 he was survived by his widow, two sons, a daughter, six grandchildren, and two great-grandchildren.

== Selected publications ==
- Holborow, E. J. (October 1953). "Rheumatic Fever: Biochemical and Histopathological Aspects". Postgrad Med J. 29 (336): 482–486. doi:10.1136/pgmj.29.336.482. PMC 2500480. PMID 13100127.
- Holborow, E. J.; Weir, D. M.; Johnson, G. D. (1957). "A serum factor in lupus erythematosus with affinity for tissue nuclei". British Medical Journal. 2 (5047): 732–734. doi:10.1136/bmj.2.5047.732. PMC 1962253. PMID 13460368.
- Holborow, E. J.; Denman, A. M. (December 1967). "Autoimmune disease in inbred mice". Clin Exp Immunol. 2(Suppl) (Suppl): 761–767. PMC 1579518. PMID 5590109.
- Papamichail, M.; Brown, J.C.; Holborow, E.J. (16 October 1971). "Immunoglobulins on the surface of human lymphocytes". The Lancet. 298 (7729): 850–852. doi:10.1016/S0140-6736(71)90224-8. PMID 4106875.
- Whitehouse, J. M.; Holborow, E. J. (27 November 1971). "Smooth Muscle Antibody in Malignant Disease". Br Med J. 4 (5786): 511–513. doi:10.1136/bmj.4.5786.511. PMC 1799774. PMID 4942740.
- Holborow, E. J. (1979). "Antinucleic acid antibodies". J Clin Pathol Suppl (R Coll Pathol). 13: 107–111. doi:10.1136/jcp.s3-13.1.107. PMC 1521600. PMID 93113.
- Unsworth, D. J.; Manuel, P. D.; Walker-Smith, J. A.; Campbell, C. A.; Johnson, G. D.; Holborow, E. J. (November 1981). "New immunofluorescent blood test for gluten sensitivity". Arch Dis Child. 56 (11): 864–868. doi:10.1136/adc.56.11.864. PMC 1627382. PMID 7030226.
- Johnson, G.D.; Davidson, R.S.; McNamee, K.C.; Russell, G.; Goodwin, D.; Holborow, E.J. (17 December 1982). "Fading of immunofluorescence during microscopy: a study of the phenomenon and its remedy". Journal of Immunological Methods. 55 (2): 231–242. doi:10.1016/0022-1759(82)90035-7. PMID 6819318.
- Kataaha, P. K.; Facer, C. A.; Holborow, E. J. (May 1984). "Plasmodium falciparum products enhance human lymphocyte transformation by Epstein-Barr virus". Clin Exp Immunol. 56 (2): 371–376. PMC 1536217. PMID 6329564.
- Winrow, V. R.; Norton, J.; Holborow, E. J.; Stierle, H. E.; Young, A.; Sachs, J. A. (April 1988). "T cell cytotoxicity to Epstein-Barr virus infected B cells: comparison of patients with rheumatoid arthritis and their HLA identical siblings". Ann Rheum Dis. 47 (4): 280–285. doi:10.1136/ard.47.4.280. PMC 1003507. PMID 2835019.
- Mageed, R. A.; Kirwan, J. R.; Thompson, P. W.; McCarthy, D. A.; Holborow, E. J. (April 1991). "Characterisation of the size and composition of circulating immune complexes in patients with rheumatoid arthritis". Ann Rheum Dis. 50 (4): 231–236. doi:10.1136/ard.50.4.231. PMC 1004392. PMID 2029205.
