= Holbrow =

Holbrow is a surname. Notable people with the surname include:

- Charles H. Holbrow (1935–2023), American physicist
- Gwendolyn Holbrow (born 1957), American artist

== See also ==
- Holborow, surname
