= John Hacking =

John Hacking may refer to:

- Jack Hacking (1897–1955), English footballer
- John Hacking (cricketer) (1909–1999), English cricketer
