= Paul Ramage =

English cricketer and headmaster

Personal information
- Full name: Paul Frederick Ramage
- Born: 13 March 1940 (age 86); Leamington Spa, Warwickshire, England
- Batting: Left-handed
- Bowling: Slow left-arm orthodox

Domestic team information
- Years: Team
- 1970–1972: Buckinghamshire
- 1962–1963: Cambridge University

Career statistics
Competition	First-class
Matches	13
Runs scored	252
Batting average	16.80
100s/50s	–/1
Top score	50
Balls bowled	1,303
Wickets	17
Bowling average	36.05
5 wickets in innings	–
10 wickets in match	–
Best bowling	4/65
Catches/stumpings	5/–
- Source: Cricinfo, 4 July 2011

Paul Frederick Ramage (born 13 March 1940) is a former English first-class cricketer and headmaster.

Ramage was born in Leamington Spa, Warwickshire, and attended Warwick School.

A left-handed batsman who bowled slow left-arm orthodox, he made his first-class debut for Cambridge University against Somerset in 1962. He made 12 further first-class appearances for the university, the last of which came against Nottinghamshire in 1963. In his 13 first-class matches, he scored 252 runs at an average of 16.80, with a high score of 50. This score, his only first-class half century, came against the Free Foresters in 1962. With the ball, he took 17 wickets at a bowling average of 36.05, with best figures of 4 for 65 against Combined Services in 1962.

He later made his debut for Buckinghamshire in the 1970 Minor Counties Championship against Berkshire. Ramage played Minor counties cricket for Buckinghamshire from 1970 to 1972, which included 8 Minor Counties Championship appearances.

He became a schoolteacher. In 1967 he was master-in-charge of cricket at University College School in London. He was headmaster of The Hall School, Hampstead, from 1993 to 2003 and from 2005 to 2006.
