= Norton Lindsey =

Village in Warwickshire, England

Coordinates: 52°15′N 1°40′W

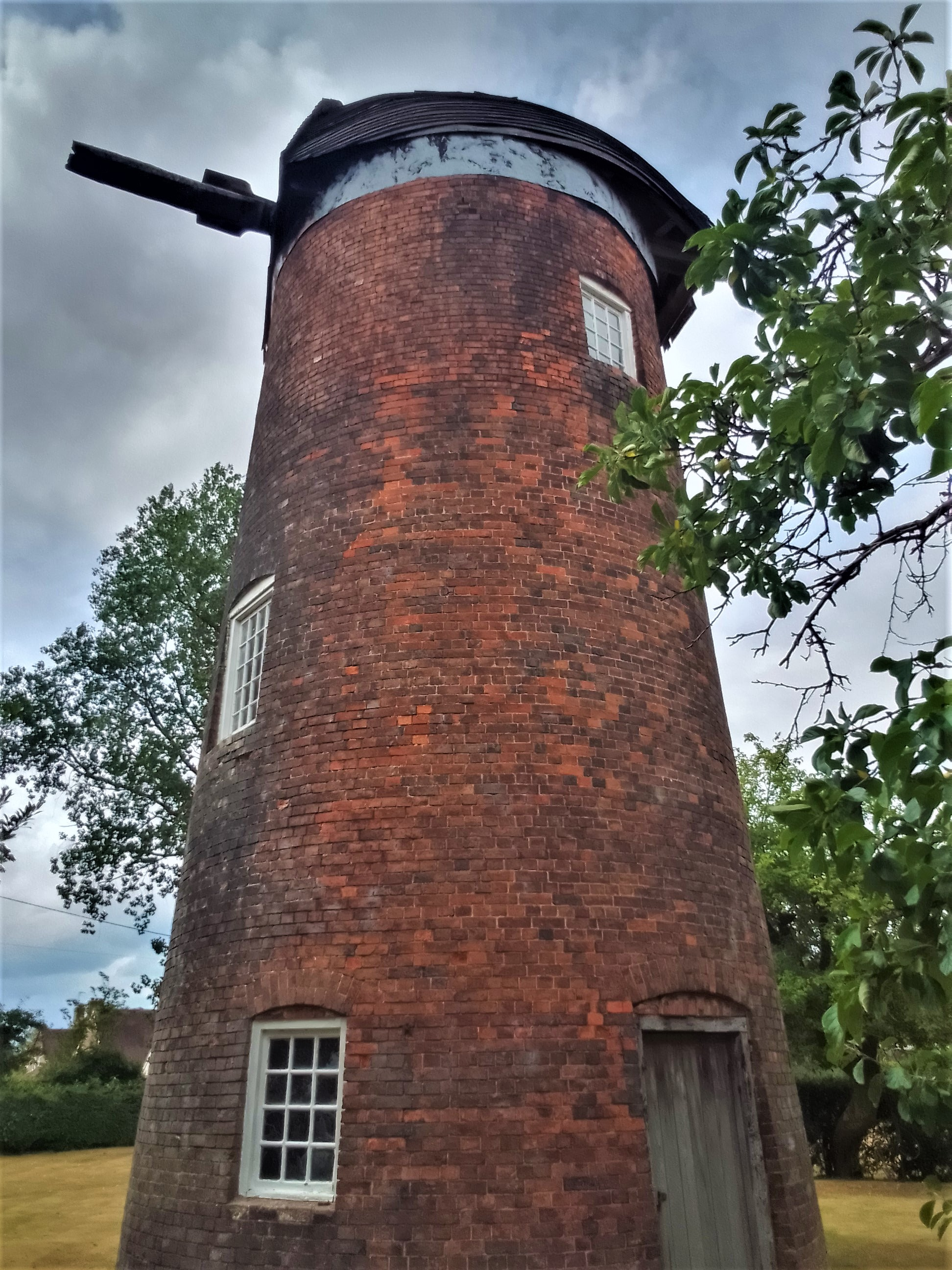
The village windmill

Norton Lindsey is a village and civil parish in Warwickshire, England, 3.5 miles south-west of the tourist and county town of Warwick and a mile west of the M40 motorway. At the 2011 census, the parish had a population of 326, however because the village is split between three civil parishes (Norton Lindsey CP, Wolverton CP and Claverdon CP) the population of the village is difficult to accurately determine.

The village takes its name from the Lindsey family who were lords of the manor in the 12th century. The parish church of the Holy Trinity dates from the following century. The village has a windmill. Two of the village's other prominent features are the Village Hall and the cricket club, which is shared with nearby Wolverton.

Wolverton Primary School is also located in Norton Lindsey Village, having originally been built between the two villages, but over time being subsumed into Norton Lindsey.

The village also is home to The New Inn, Warwickshire's first community owned pub and Shop.
