= Arthur Cranfield =

British newspaper editor

Arthur Leslie Cranfield (19 June 1892 – 9 October 1957) was a British newspaper editor.

Born in St Ives, then in Huntingdonshire, Cranfield attended St Ives Grammar School. During World War I, he served in the Essex Regiment as a captain and a brigade signalling officer. After the war, he became a journalist, working on a variety of local papers before, in 1922, becoming chief sub-editor for the Evening News.

In 1926, Cranfield was appointed as the first editor-in-chief of the Press Association. Two years later, he returned to the Evening News as assistant editor, then held the same post at the Daily Mail from 1930 to 1935, when he was chosen as the paper's editor. In 1939, he instead became managing editor of the Evening Standard, then in 1941 moved to become editor of The Star.

Cranfield retired in 1957, and died later in the year.

Media offices
Preceded by W. L. Warden	Editor of the Daily Mail; 1935 – 1938	Succeeded by Bob Prew
Preceded by Robin Cruickshank	Editor of The Star; 1941 – 1957	Succeeded by Ralph McCarthy
