= Holborow =

Holborow is a surname. Notable people with the surname include:

- Barbara Holborow (1930–2012), Australian magistrate
- Eric John Holborow (1918–2009), English physician and medical researcher
- Jonathan Holborow (born 1943), British newspaper editor
- Justin Holborow (born 1996), Australian actor
- Marnie Holborow, Irish writer and academic
- Lady Mary Holborow (1936–2017)
- Rachel Holborow, founding member of Red Monkey
- Richard Holborow (born 1984), Cardiac Physiologist and Regulator
- Wally Holborow (1913–1986), American baseball player
- William Holborow (1841–1917), Australian politician
