= Wolverton, Warwickshire =

Village in Warwickshire, England

Coordinates: 52°15′36″N 1°42′00″W

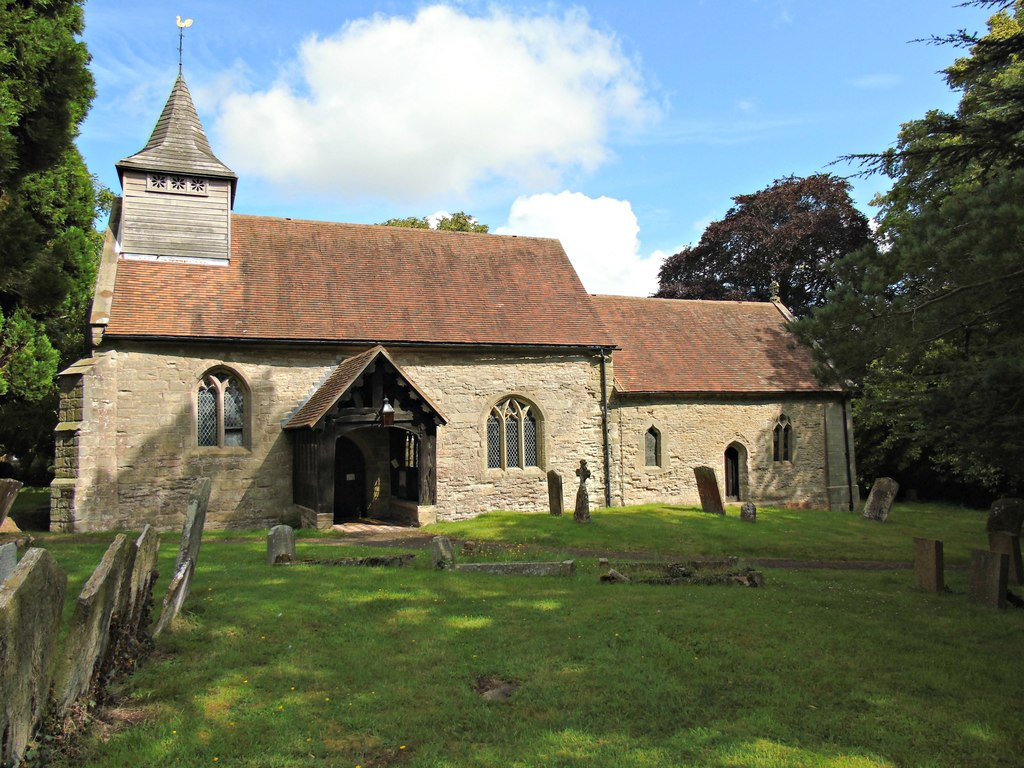
St Mary the Virgin Church

Wolverton is a village and civil parish in the Stratford-on-Avon District of Warwickshire, England, roughly equidistant between Stratford-upon-Avon to the south and the county town of Warwick to the east. The parish population at the 2011 census was 212, and at the 2021 census had risen to 250. The village is somewhat smaller in geographic area than the parish and contains about half the parish population.

== Heritage ==
Roman artefacts were found in the north-east of the parish and to the east of the present-day houses. Saxon artefacts have also appeared. The village was recorded in the Domesday Book of 1086 as Ulwarditone, having two estates or manors. One of the manors was among the lands of Robert de Stafford, and the estate remained with his descendants until at least 1460. Wolverton was known as Wolverdington until the middle of the 19th century.

=== Listed buildings ===
The parish church is dedicated to St Mary the Virgin, its oldest part dating from the 13th century, with additions made in the 14th, 16th and 19th centuries. It is accessible only by a path, as it is set back from the road. The church is a Grade II* listed building Some window glass in the west and north-west of the church dates from the 13th century. The so-called "Doom" glass at the top of the east window is from the 14th century.

The Old Rectory in Main Street is a 17th-century building enlarged in the mid-19th century. Part of it is timber framed with painted brick infill. It also qualifies as a Grade II listed building, as do five other residential buildings and a telephone box in the village.

Another Grade II listed building, Wolverton Court, has a 1547 Tudor wing adjoined to an early 1800s Georgian section via a 1913 Queen Ann style section designed by Welsh architect Clough Williams-Ellis, best known for creating the Italianate tourist village of Portmeirion in North Wales. Wolverton Court was used in both World Wars for military purposes. In World War I it served as a military hospital, and in World War II it was used by the Women's Land Army.

=== Naval chaplain ===
Wolverton was the birthplace on 18 March 1621 of the Church of England cleric Henry Teonge, whose father was Rector in 1619–1662. Henry Teonge kept observant diaries of two Mediterranean voyages he made as a naval chaplain in 1675–1676 and 1678–1679.

== Amenities ==
Wolverton Primary School, in Wolverton Fields (in the parish, but not in the village), dates from 1876. The school was built halfway between Wolverton and the neighbouring village of Norton Lindsey after residents from both villages decided in 1875 that a local school was needed. The village shares a cricket club based in the nearby village of Norton Lindsey. The village is served by twice-weekly Flexibus services to Stratford upon Avon. The nearest railway station is at Claverdon railway station (1.5 miles) away. This offers a Monday–Saturday service of five trains a day between Stratford and Warwick, with connections to Birmingham Moor Street and London Marylebone.
