= David Foskett =

British judge

The Honourable Mr Justice Foskett
- Royal coat of arms of the United Kingdom

High Court Judge
- In office 2 October 2007 – 2019

Personal details
- Born: 16 March 1949 (age 77)
- Education: King's College London

Sir David Robert Foskett (born 19 March 1949), styled The Hon. Mr Justice Foskett, was a judge of the High Court of England and Wales.

== Education ==
He was educated at Warwick School and at King's College London (LLB, 1970) during which time he also served as President of the Students' Union and was awarded the College's Jelf Medal.

== Career ==
He was called to the bar at Gray's Inn in 1972 and became a bencher there in 1999 and Treasurer in 2018 in succession to Baroness Hale. He was made a QC in 1991, recorder from 1995-2007, deputy judge of the High Court from 1998-2007, and judge of the High Court of Justice (Queen's Bench Division) since 2007.

Foskett is the author of the leading text on the law of compromise in England and Wales. He is a member of the Athenaeum Club.

On 1 June 2019, Sir David took up the role of Chair of the Civil Mediation Council. The Civil Mediation Council is a Registered Charity and is the professional and regulatory body for civil and workplace mediators in England and Wales. In taking up his position as the CMC’s fifth Chair, Sir David said “I am delighted to have been invited to take over from Alan Ward as Chair of the Civil Mediation Council. As ever, Alan will be a hard act to follow and the Council is greatly in his debt for the hard work and support he has given it over the last six years. I acted as a mediator before my appointment as a judge and have been an active supporter of the process during my judicial career. I am looking forward to bringing that experience into the mediation process and, more importantly, with the assistance of my colleagues in the Council, to advancing the cause of mediation at a time when the need for the assisted resolution of disputes without recourse to litigation or other proceedings is more pressing than ever.”

== Arms ==
Coat of arms of David Foskett

Notes
Displayed on a painted panel at Gray's Inn.
Crest
A Dove wings elevated and addorsed Argent beaked and legged Or holding in the beak a Branch of Olive Or fructed Sable and in the dexter foot a Staff raguly bendwise also Or.
Escutcheon
Per pale Sable and Gules a Chain in bend throughout between in sinister chief a Lion’s Head and in dexter base a Bear’s Head contourny both erased Or.
Motto
Pax Et Consensio Vincant
