= Denys Shortt =

British businessman

Denys C. Shortt OBE is a British businessman.

== Early life ==
Shortt attended Eagle House Prep School in Surrey and Warwick School in Warwick. At Warwick School he was selected to play hockey for England at age 15. He played for England at U16, u18 and U21 levels for both indoor and outdoor hockey.

== Career ==
Shortt founded DCS Europe plc in 1994 at his home in a stable block in Buckland, Broadway, England. In 2012 DCS employed 250 people with sales of £148 million. The company distributes health and beauty products. In 2020 DCS Group UK Ltd employed 400 people with sales of £268 million and are now headquartered in Banbury, Oxfordshire, England. The company also owns a new toiletries factory in Redditch, Worcestershire, England. In 2022 DCS Group UK Ltd reached annual sales of £320m. In 2024 The Grocer Magazine stated DCS Group had reached annual sales of £350m.

In 2000 he started Enable Software with co-founder Andrew Butt in Buckland in an old stable block. Enable Software started with 3 employees and now employs 25 with annual sales of £1.7 million. In 2020 Enable raised $12m in Silicon Valley with Menlo Ventures. Andrew Butt co-founder moved to the Head Office in San Francisco. In 2021 Enable raised $45 million in a Series B funding. The company now headquartered in San Francisco employs over 600. In 2023 Enable raised a Series D of $120m to become a Unicorn - valued at $1.12bn. Total amount raised $276m. Denys Shortt exited the company in 2023.

== Pro-bono activities ==
In Dec 2010 Shortt became Chairman of the Coventry & Warwickshire Local Enterprise Partnership. He retired in May 2012.

He was on the advisory Board of Warwick Business School, and he was a Director of Stratford Town Football Club.

Shortt founded an organization "Business Supporting Stratford" to facilitate charitable donations from Stratford area businesses.

== Awards ==
Shortt was 2000 Entrepreneur of the Year and he was presented with a Growing Business Award in 2011.

Shortt was appointed Officer of the Order of the British Empire (OBE) in the 2013 New Year Honours for services to the Economy in the West Midlands.

== Personal life ==
Shortt is married with a son and daughter. He is a helicopter pilot. He was Chairman of the Ladykillers Hockey Club.
