= Tim Dalton (rugby union) =

England international rugby union player

- Full name: Timothy Joseph Dalton
- Born: 2 September 1940 Warwick, England
- Died: 7 February 2014 (aged 73) Tauranga, New Zealand

Rugby union career
- Position: Fly-half
International career
Years	Team	Apps	(Points)
1969	England	1	(0)

Timothy Joseph Dalton (2 September 1940 – 7 February 2014) was an English rugby union international.

Dalton, a Warwick School product, played as a fly-half and was a regular in the Coventry team through the 1960s, featuring in 249 games. He gained an England cap against Scotland at Twickenham in 1969, when he substituted an injured Keith Fielding on the right wing after 30 minutes. His move to rival club the Rugby Lions later that year was controversial, causing Coventry to cancel future fixtures between the sides. He made 48 County Championship appearances with Warwickshire and after emigrating to New Zealand in the 1970s played provincial rugby for Bay of Plenty.

== See also ==
- List of England national rugby union players
