= Eric Bywaters =

British rheumatologist

Eric George Lapthorne Bywaters CBE FRCP (1 June 1910 – 2 April 2003) was a British rheumatologist.

== Early years ==
Bywaters studied at the Middlesex Hospital Medical School, graduating in 1933 with a gold medal and honours in pathology, and then worked as an assistant to pathologist Lionel Whitby.

== Career ==
In 1937 he was invited by rheumatologist Walter Bauer to work at Massachusetts General Hospital and perform research on lupus erythematosus. When war broke out in 1939, Bywaters returned to Britain, but was not taken into the army because of kidney problems and instead took over Rheumatology at the British Postgraduate Medical School at Hammersmith Hospital. During the bombing of London, he clarified that so-called crush syndrome was renal failure in wounded bomb victims who had been freed from crushing injuries. Bywaters traced the condition to the release of myoglobin from injured muscle tissue entering the bloodstream. He found a method of treatment in the form of intravenous or oral administration of alkaline fluids.

After the war, he built up rheumatology as an independent medical discipline. In 1947, he became director of a small hospital department for rheumatism sufferers at the Canadian Red Cross Memorial Hospital in the village of Taplow, near Maidenhead in Berkshire. Immediately after the discovery of the therapeutic effect of cortisone against rheumatic fever by Philip Showalter Hench and Edward Calvin Kendall he undertook clinical tests that confirmed this (participation in 1948). The approach of treating rheumatic heart disease using cortisone, was eventually made irrelevant by the availability of antibiotic treatment, which nearly eliminated the disease in the UK and other developed countries. Bywaters used his expertise as a pathologist for accurate characterization of rheumatic diseases and to develop new methods of treatment of juvenile chronic arthritis in children and adolescents.

== Recognition ==
In 1963 he received the Canada Gairdner International Award for his work studying rheumatoid arthritis, and he was made a Commander of the Order of the British Empire in 1975.

== Personal life ==
His hobbies were gardening and painting.

He was born on 1 June 1910 in London and died on 2 April 2003 at age 92, in Beaconsfield, England
