= Ward Maule =

English clergyman and cricketer

Ward Maule (1 September 1833 – 23 September 1913) was an Indian-born English clergyman and cricketer who played first-class cricket for Cambridge University and for the amateur Gentlemen of Kent team. He was born in Mangalore, Karnataka, India and died at Boulogne, France.

Maule was the son of John Templeman Maule, who was a surgeon with the Madras medical authorities. He was educated at Warwick School and at Tonbridge School and matriculated at Gonville and Caius College, Cambridge in 1851, though the record indicates (perhaps mistakenly) that he did not achieve his Bachelor of Laws degree until 1871. As a cricketer, he played in four major matches for Cambridge University in 1853 as a lower-order batsman and a bowler, though it is not known what his batting or bowling style was; these games included the 1853 University Match against Oxford University in which he scored 7 and 14 not out (his highest first-class score) and took three wickets. In 1854, he played a single match for a Gentlemen of Kent side against the Gentlemen of England, but he is not recorded in any further games.

Maule was ordained as a deacon in the Church of England in Bombay in 1856 and as a priest in 1859; he was first a chaplain at Nellore in southern India and then at Colaba, near Bombay. From 1872 to 1879 he was successively archdeacon and commissary at Bombay and then senior chaplain at St. Thomas Cathedral, Mumbai. He later settled at Boulogne in France where he was British chaplain and where he died in 1913.
