= Eric Hope =

British musician (1915–1999)

Eric Hope (17 January 1915 – 2 August 1999) was a British pianist.

Born in Stratford-upon-Avon, Warwickshire, of Baltic descent, Hope was a pupil at Warwick School, 1931–34. He studied piano in London under Kathleen Arnold and Franz Reizenstein and was a conscientious objector during the Second World War. He was a specialist in the works of Johann Sebastian Bach, Franz Liszt and Claude Debussy. In 1973, Hope joined the staff of the Royal Academy of Music and was made an Honorary Member in 1978. He also taught at the London College of Music and was president of the University of Birmingham Music Society. He died in Nottingham in 1999.

== Publications ==
- Handbook of Piano Playing, Students' Music Library, Dobson Books Ltd, December 1955, ISBN 978-0234772720
- Aids to technique: Muscular development exercises for pianists and other instrumentalists, Edwin Ashdown, 1962
- Basic Piano Exercises, Edwin Ashdown, 1963
