= The King's High School for Girls =

King's High School

Location
- Banbury Road; Warwick, CV34 6YE; England
- Coordinates: 52°16′57″N 1°35′07″W

Information
- Type: Private day school
- Established: 1879
- Head Master: Stephen Burley
- Gender: Girls
- Age: 11 to 18
- Enrolment: c. 700
- Colours: Jade green and navy blue
- Website: Official website

The King's High School (also called simply King's High or KHS) is a private day school for girls aged 11–18 with boarding available for Year 9 - Sixth Form on the Banbury Road, Warwick, England. One of its main feeder schools is Warwick Preparatory School, which takes girls from the ages of 3 to 11 and boys up to the age of 7.

== History ==
Plans for a girls' school in Warwick were drawn up as long ago as 1875, but the school could not get underway until 1879. In this year boys from The King's School, Warwick, later to become known as Warwick School, who were being taught in Landor House, the modern site of the girls' school and the birthplace of the poet Walter Savage Landor, finally moved to their new buildings south of the River Avon. KHS, The Squirrels (the nickname of the Prep School), The Kingsley School and Warwick School now form the Warwick Schools Foundation. The King's High School for Girls has suffered throughout its history from being very short of space, and, since its foundation, has taken over the buildings of two neighbouring schools. The premises of one of them, the former King's Middle School (which was only in existence from 1875 to 1906), caught fire in 1970.

There are now brand new buildings, including a new sixth form building, completed in 2006, on the former Middle School site. It was opened in December 2006 by Dame Judi Dench, new Art, Music and DT facilities, and new refurbished dining room. The school no longer has the lease on the former St Peter's Chapel, known as the Eastgate, situated at the top of Smith Street. There is an astroturf pitch and over 6 acres (2.4 ha) of playing fields on land adjoining Warwick School's own playing fields half a mile to the south.

Increasing levels of co-operation between Warwick School and King's High School for Girls has led to the joint teaching of certain AS Level and A Level subjects from September 2004, for example drama, physical education and most recently politics. Girls have also been admitted since 2003 to the Warwick School Combined Cadet Force, founded in 1948. In the same year a former sixth former and former head girl, Alice Woodhouse, received Young Human Rights Reporter of the Year. A group of girls successfully swam across the English Channel in 2012.

In September 2016 it was announced that the school would move to a new £30 million development adjacent to Warwick School and the Prep School on Myton Road. The school was named West Midlands Independent Secondary School of the Year 2019 by the Sunday Times Parent Power School Guide. The school opened its doors at the new site in September 2019.

=== Headmistresses/Head Masters ===
- 1879–1895 M Fisher
- 1896–1913 M Lea
- 1913–1921 E M Edgehill
- 1921–1922 G Gargner
- 1922–1944 V E L Doorly
- 1945–1947 G M Wiseman
- 1948–1970 W Hare
- 1970–1987 M Leahy
- 1987–2001 J M Anderson
- 2001–2015 E S Surber
- 2015–2020 R Nicholson
- 2021–present S Burley

== Notable former pupils ==
- Dr Barbara Ansell (1923–2001), UK founder of pediatric rheumatology.
- Catherine Bott (b. 1952), Soprano Singer and Radio Presenter
- Dr Helen Castor (b. 1968), historian, author and formerly a lecturer at University of Cambridge
- Professor Emma Dench, the McLean professor of ancient and modern history, Harvard University
- Kim Hartman (b. 1952), actress, most notably Private Helga Geerhart in 'Allo 'Allo!.
- Nadia Parkes (b. 1995), The Spanish Princess and Domina (TV series) actress
- Lucy Rose (b. 1989), Indie/folk singer-songwriter
- Professor Dame Julia Slingo DBE (b. 1950), Met Office Chief Scientist
- June Tabor (b. 1947), Folk singer
- Sophie Turner (b. 1996), Game of Thrones actress
- Gemma Whelan (b. 1981), Game of Thrones actress
