= Barbara Ansell =

English physician (1923–2001)

Barbara Ansell CBE FRCP FRCS
- Born: Barbara Mary Ansell; 30 August 1923; Warwick, England
- Died: 14 September 2001 (aged 78); Slough, Berkshire, England
- Education: University of Birmingham, Hammersmith Hospital
- Awards: CBE, FRCP
- Scientific career
- Fields: paediatric rheumatology, chronic joint disorders
- Workplaces: Northwick Park Hospital

Barbara Mary Ansell (30 August 1923 – 14 September 2001) was a British medical doctor and the founder of the field of paediatric rheumatology. Ansell was notable for outstanding contributions to the advancement of paediatric knowledge, specifically defining chronic joint disorders and the improvement of their management.

== Life ==
Ansell was educated at King's High School for Girls. She qualified at the University of Birmingham in 1946 and did her post-graduate training at the Royal Postgraduate Medical School in Hammersmith. In 1951 she was appointed as registrar to Professor Eric Bywaters at the Canadian Red Cross Memorial Hospital, Taplow, Buckinghamshire, where she conducted research on heart disease in rheumatic fever.

== Career ==
Ansell was based at the Canadian Red Cross Memorial Hospital, specializing in the research and treatment of Juvenile Idiopathic Arthritis. She developed a classification system for childhood arthritis. While focusing on treatment of the disease, she recognised the importance of maintaining educational and social skills in young patients.

She pioneered a team system of professionals including physiotherapists, occupational therapists, nurses, teachers, social workers, ophthalmologists, orthopaedic surgeons, dentists, and podiatrists in order to treat and manage her patients.

In 1962, Ansell was appointed consultant clinical physician in rheumatology at Taplow. She was appointed head of Division of Rheumatology at the Clinical Research Centre at Northwick Park Hospital in 1976. She was awarded a scholarship to study in Chicago at the Research and Education Hospital as a research fellow. In 1997, Ansell was recognised with a Visiting Professorship at Leeds in 1997.

"During her life she made a major contribution to the understanding of children with Juvenile Idiopathic Arthritis and in developing services to treat them in the United Kingdom. Her influence was not restricted to this country, and by the time she retired from the Health Service in 1988, she was the world leader in the care of childhood arthritis."

Ansell was author of over 360 papers in adult and paediatric rheumatology and was an honorary member or fellow of over sixteen national and international societies.

Ansell died from ovarian cancer, aged 78, and a memorial service was held in Southwark Cathedral on 16 February 2002. Her husband, Angus Weston, predeceased her. They had no children.

After her death, a new science building at the Kings High School for Girls, and a street in Warwick (Ansell Way), were named in her honour. In November 2024, a blue plaque was installed at her childhood home at 5 Neville Court, Jury Street, Warwick.

== Bibliography ==
- Clinics in Rheumatic Diseases (W. B. Saunders, 1976 London)
- Chronic Ailments in Childhood (1976)
- Rheumatic Disorders in Childhood (Postgraduate Paediatrics) (Butterworth-Heinemann Ltd), ISBN 0-407-00186-7
- Color Atlas of Pediatric Rheumatology (Mosby, 1991), ISBN 0-7234-1658-3

== Awards and honours ==
- CBE in 1982
