= Geoff Wilde =

British engineer

Geoffrey Light Wilde OBE (21 May 1917 – 18 August 2007) was a British engineer employed by Rolls-Royce Limited.

== Early life ==
Geoffrey Light Wilde was born in Plumstead, London.

He was first educated in France, where his father Alfred was working. His father died when he was 12. He would later move to Leamington and attend Warwick School. He was then apprenticed to the Daimler Company in Coventry. Later he gained an HNC in Mechanical Engineering from Coventry Technical College.

== Career ==
=== Rolls-Royce ===
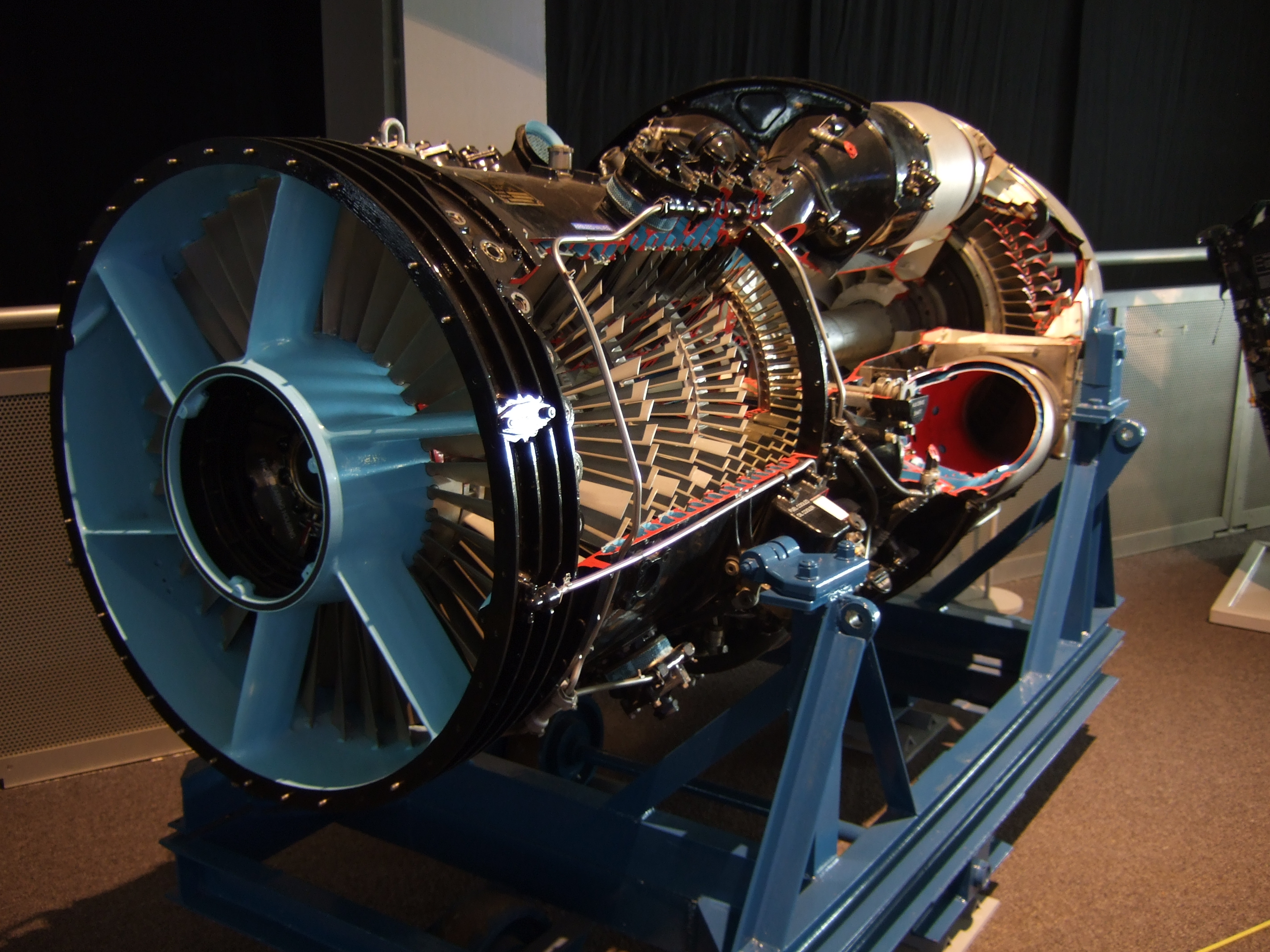
Rolls-Royce Avon; he designed the innovative multi-stage compressor

In 1938 he joined Rolls-Royce Limited in Derby where he did much of the design work for their compressors. While working on test beds for the Merlin engines, he proposed a variable-speed supercharger, to increase the performance at altitude, that was subsequently incorporated in the Merlin XX. He helped Stanley Hooker to design and develop the Merlin two-stage supercharger used in the Merlin 60-series.

Early jet engines were being developed at Lutterworth in Leicestershire, which were having problems with surging. He tested the centrifugal compressor at Derby, and found a solution to the difficulties of surging.

In 1943, he was put in charge of the supercharger and compressor department at Derby.

In 1947, he was put in charge of the design and development of the AJ65 Avon axial-flow jet engine. It had had difficulties with compressor blades breaking. He produced solutions for the design of the multi-stage compressor of the Avon, one of R-R's most successful jet engines.

He later oversaw the development of the compressor for the Conway, the world's first turbofan (by-pass) engine.

In 1956, he set up the Advanced Projects Design Office. Work from this department produced the Medway (cancelled) and Spey engines.

In 1960, he formed a new department to investigate new projects. He chose a new three-shaft design, which was launched as the RB211. He proposed its wide chord fan blade to obtain maximum aerodynamic efficiency. He was not responsible for all of the project, and when Hyfil carbon fibre (developed at the RAE) was chosen for the fan blade, he said that "this material would not be strong enough in the case of a bird strike". This was found to be experimentally true, at great cost to the project and to Rolls-Royce.

He made great improvements to the design of the high-pressure (HP) turbine blade, and this design is still in Rolls-Royce engines today, and in other manufacturers. He also set up the High-Temperature Demonstrator Unit (HTDU) in 1972 to investigate the cooling of turbine blades and thermal fatigue. All airliners today carry this technology.

== Personal life ==
He retired from Rolls-Royce in 1978. He was appointed OBE in 1969. From the Royal Society he received the Mullard Award in 1979 for his work on the RB211. He died in August 2007 aged 90.

For most of his life he lived at Turnditch in Derbyshire. During the war years he lodged with Ernest Townsend and his family in Coxbench, Derbyshire. In 1996 he was awarded an honorary DTech degree by Loughborough University.
