= Chris Whiteside =

English cricketer

Christopher Julian Whiteside (12 August 1953 - 11 September 2022) was an English cricketer.

Whiteside was educated at Warwick School. He was a highly promising and tall right-arm bowler and right-handed batsman who played once for Middlesex in the Sunday League versus Hampshire at Lord's in 1975. He failed to take a wicket or score any runs as Middlesex slipped to defeat. His progress was halted by a back injury, but he later played in club cricket.
