= Francis Wilford-Smith =

British cartoonist and record producer (1927–2009)

- Born: Francis Wilford Smith; 12 March 1927; Rugby, Warwickshire, England
- Died: 4 December 2009 (aged 82); Ledbury, Herefordshire
- Other names: Smilby
- Occupations: Cartoonist, graphic designer, record producer, expert on blues music
- Years active: 1946–1998
- Spouse: Pamela Kilby (m. 1949)

Francis Wilford-Smith (né Wilford Smith; (Note: He was born without the hyphen in his surname, he later added it in 1983, to comply with the inheritance stipulations of a relative's will.) 12 March 1927 – 4 December 2009) was a British cartoonist, graphic artist, and producer and archivist of blues music. As a cartoonist, he used the pseudonym Smilby, a contraction of his surname with his wife's maiden name.

== Biography ==
He was born Francis Wilford Smith (without a hyphen) in Rugby, Warwickshire, England, the second son of pharmacist Wilford Smith and Frances Hunt, who died shortly after his birth. He attended Warwick School, where he began drawing cartoons, but left at the age of 16 to train as a radio operator. He joined the Merchant Navy, serving during the Second World War on convoys to Africa and across the Atlantic. During this time he also worked as an undercover courier and agent for US Naval Intelligence, intercepting telephone conversations and collecting and delivering material to US consular staff in the Belgian Congo and Persian Gulf.

In 1946, he began attending Camberwell School of Art in London, specialising in illustration and wood engraving. While there, he met Humphrey Lyttelton, Wally Fawkes, and his future wife, Pamela Kilby, whom he wed in 1949. "Kilby" combined with "Smith" led to their collective nickname of "Smilby". He then became an art teacher, and for a time worked as an animator with Halas and Batchelor, before becoming assistant display manager for the women's clothing chain Richard Shops and assistant to the industrial designer Ian Bradbury. However, by 1951, his cartoons had begun appearing in Punch and other magazines, and he became a full-time cartoonist, later working for the Daily Telegraph, Playboy, and many others. From the early 1960s, he also worked widely in Europe and the USA, publishing cartoons in various periodicals including The New Yorker, Esquire, and the Saturday Evening Post.

Working as "Smilby", he also designed many advertising campaigns for Guinness, ICI, Boots and others, and was a freelance consultant to advertising agencies. He also worked more widely as a graphic designer and book illustrator. As Francis Smilby, he wrote Stolen Sweets: The Cover Girls of Yesteryear (1981), a definitive history of early pin-up magazines.

He was an expert on and major collector of blues and gospel music, writing and broadcasting on the subject. He owned one of the world's most important collections of early 78 rpm recorded piano blues. In the late 1950s and 1960s he was responsible for recording many musicians, such as Roosevelt Sykes, Little Brother Montgomery, Muddy Waters, Otis Spann, Champion Jack Dupree, and Memphis Slim, at his home in Sussex. He wrote:

"When the first blues singers began to tour this country [UK], I was deeply concerned that their music should be recorded for posterity before it was lost for ever. So I would stagger down from London to my Sussex farmhouse with a heavy hired tape recorder and microphone, and get a local farmer to load the village hall piano onto a trailer, bring it down by tractor, and install it in my living room where the thick walls and beamed ceiling had good acoustic properties."

Many of his recordings were issued by Magpie Records, and he was twice nominated for Sony Awards.

He hyphenated his surname by deed poll in 1983, so as to comply with the inheritance stipulations of a relative's will. He continued to draw until forced to give up through ill health in 1998.

He and Pamela had one son and one daughter. He died in 2009 in Ledbury, Herefordshire, at the age of 82. Pamela Wilford-Smith died on 4 September 2010.

His biography, Blues for Francis, by Caroline Beecroft and Howard Rye, was published in 2015.
