= Marko Stanojevic =

Italy international rugby union player

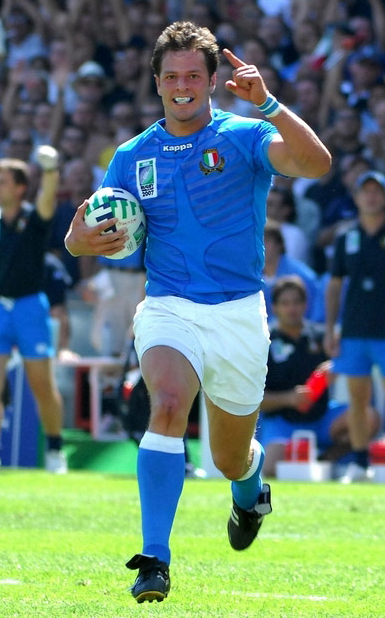
- Born: Marko Peter Stanojevic; 1 October 1979 (age 47) Birmingham, England
- Height: 1.80 m (5 ft 11 in)
- Weight: 82 kg (12 st 13 lb)
- School: Warwick School, Warwick
- University: University of the West of England

Rugby union career
- Position: Wing
Senior career
Years	Team	Apps	(Points)
2001–02	Coventry		
2002–03	Colleferro	18	(125)
2003–07	Bristol	7	(10)
2007–09	Calvisano	11	(10)
2009-10	I Cavalieri	17	(20)
2010-11	Rovigo	12	(25)
- Correct as of 2011-06-17
International career
Years	Team	Apps	(Points)
2006–	Italy	7	(45)
- Correct as of 2009-09-11
National sevens team
Years	Team		Comps
- Italy
- Correct as of 2007-08-19

Marko Peter Stanojevic (Serbian: Stanojević; born 1 October 1979 in Birmingham, England) is an Italian rugby union footballer. He last played on the wing for Italian Top12 club Rovigo. Before his move to Italy, he had played four seasons with Bristol in England.

== Playing career ==
Born in Birmingham to a Serbian father and Italian mother, Stanojevic played his school rugby at Warwick School. After playing for local club side Claverdon RFC he came to the attention of Bristol in 1998, when he attended several training sessions after he matriculated at the University of the West of England. Stanojevic soon began making frequent appearances in the Bristol U-21s, and signed an academy contract in 1999. After earning a degree in Information Systems at UWE, he spent the 2001–02 season at Coventry RFC, and then went to Italy for a season at Colleferro.

Qualifying for Italy through his mother, he was named to the national sevens team in 2002. Stanojevic returned to Bristol Rugby, this time with the senior side, in 2003, and went on to score 17 tries during a 2004–05 season which saw Bristol promoted to the Guinness Premiership. He continued to play for Bristol through the 2006-07 season.

He made his first appearance for the 15-man national team in 2006 against Portugal. He added five more appearances for the Azzurri before the 2007 Rugby World Cup. Stanojevic scored one of two Italian tries in their blowout loss to the All Blacks in their Rugby World Cup opener.
