= Henry Teonge =

Henry Teonge (18 March 1621, at Wolverton, Warwickshire – 21 March 1690, at Spernall, Warwickshire) was an English cleric and Royal Navy chaplain who kept informative diaries of voyages he made in 1675–1676 and 1678–1679.

== Life ==
Teonge was the son of George Teonge, rector of Wolverton in 1619–1662, and his wife Dorothy, daughter of Henry Nicholls of Southam, Warwickshire. He was educated at Warwick School and at Christ's College, Cambridge, receiving his B. A. in 1643.

Teonge became the rector of Alcester, Warwickshire, some time between 1648 and 1654, and added to it the adjacent living of Spernall in 1670. He did not resign from Alcester until 1675. By this time he had a wife, Jane, three sons and a daughter to support, and his youngest son, Henry, was at Christ's College, Cambridge. It was almost certainly debts that made him take the surprising decision at the age of 55 to look for a chaplaincy posting in the Royal Navy.

The account of the first voyage begins with him in London and describes his difficulty in finding enough money to buy bedding to take on board the Assistance. Teonge relates that he "gott a good summ of monys" from that voyage (a total of about £75), but he was back at sea again after an interval of two years. In 1679 he returned to Spernall for the last eleven years of his life. Duty in Spernall was done in his absences by his son Henry – ordained in 1673 and rector of nearby Coughton from 1675 until his death in 1682. Teonge lost his wife in the same year, married again to Penelope Hunt in 1686, and died at Spernall on 21 March 1690. His will, made a few months before, valued his possessions at £66.

== First voyage ==
The diary provides lively reports of two voyages to the Mediterranean and the Levant, including a raid on a fleet of Barbary corsairs at Tripoli in 1675, under the command of Sir John Narborough. The risk posed to shipping by the "Tripolines" is a recurrent theme in the account of the first voyage.

Teonge seems to have taken to naval life with boyish enthusiasm, especially the drinking and eating. He preached on Sunday whenever possible – the diary gives his text but little else about each sermon. He describes the various routines on board ship, including striking or dipping flags and the gun salutes, of which he kept a close count: "At 10 we salute the town (Tangier) with nine guns; they give us eleven, which makes us wonder; we give five; they give as many; and we give five more."

The account of the first voyage (1 June 1675 – 16 November 1676) includes extended descriptions of the defences at Malta, of Cyprus, and of a trip he took on horseback from İskenderun (Skandaroon in the diary) to Aleppo. The topographical information in the diary is largely confirmed, for instance, by the more famous account of George Sandys. Teonge includes several extempore verses and songs of his own. His ship, the Assistance (a 555-ton ship of the line built in 1650 and commanded by Captain William Houlding) eventually limped home leaking badly: "Friday, the 17th of November, we are paid off at Deptford, where we leave the rottenest frigate that ever came to England." Teonge dated the fair copy of his account 25 July 1678.

== Second voyage ==
Teonge was kept waiting in London and Warwickshire for orders to make a second voyage, which eventually came on 11 April 1678. However, it was not until 2 May that he caught up at Gravesend with his ship, the Bristol (547 tons, built in 1653, commanded by Captain Antony Langston, whom he already knew and liked). By this time he had only sixpence in his pocket. He had earned by his first voyage £57 for his groats (4d. per lunar month for every man on board) and a net £17 8s. 6d. in pay at the rate for an ordinary seaman.

Things did not go so well on the second voyage. Teonge had hoped the Bristol would be sent back to Virginia, from where she had come. Instead, after a short trip ferrying soldiers to Ostend, she was ordered to the West Mediterranean, where the "Algerine" Barbary corsairs of Algiers were being as troublesome as the Tripolines of two years before. There was an unpleasant incident when a volunteer, Lord Mordaunt, sought to preach a sermon in Teonge's place: "I found the zealous Lord with our Captain, whom I did so handle in a smart and short discourse that he went out of the cabin in great wrath." Later the captain confined the master of the ship to his cabin for insubordination. There was an exchange of commands in Port Mahon, Minorca, when Teonge followed Langston onto the 64-gun Royal Oak (1107 tons, built in 1674, wartime complement 390). There were some pleasant meetings with old shipmates, as the Assistance was in port as well. But by then, deaths aboard the Royal Oak were becoming frequent, and on 19 March 1678 Captain Langston himself died in Alicante Roads. By the time the Royal Oak reached England at the end of May 1679, the lives of over 60 crew had been lost, and on 30 May, "we sent to shore [at Dover] thirty-two sick men – pitiful creatures." Teonge received his pay on 22 June, but had to wait for his groats until Michaelmas (29 September).

== Manuscript and editions ==
The diary passed after Teonge's death to a certain John Holyoake, probably the man of that name who was Mayor of Warwick in 1699–1700 and whose uncle had property in Spernall. It was not published until 1825. The manuscript then disappeared, which prompted allegations that it was a forgery, but it re-emerged at a Sotheby's auction in London in 1918. The 1927 scholarly edition edited by G. E. Manwaring and published in the Broadway Travellers Series under the eye of series editors Edward Denison Ross and Eileen Power has an informative introduction and notes. It was reprinted in 2005.
