= Edward Chattaway =

English journalist and newspaper editor

- Born: 1873; Leamington Spa, Warwickshire, England
- Died: 2 May 1956 (aged 82–83); London, England
- Occupation: Journalist
- Known for: Editor of The Star

Edward Chattaway (1873 – 2 May 1956) was an English journalist and editor of The Star from 1930 to 1936.

== Early life ==
Chattaway was born in Leamington Spa in 1873 the son of William Clarke Chattaway, he was educated at the Warwick School. He started as a journalist on the Warwick Advertiser and then the King's Lynn News, he gained more experience at the Birmingham Argus.

== The Star ==
In 1899 Chattaway moved to London with a job on The Star where he soon gained a reputation as a court reporter. He was soon reporting on high-profile cases such as the Moat Farm murder and the trial of Crippen. He was soon promoted in the paper until 1930 when he became the editor. He resigned in 1936 and became editorial director on the board of The Star and the News Chronicle for the next ten years.

== Family life ==
Chattaway married in 1910 to Edith May de Hane. On 2 May 1956 he died in his home in London.

Media offices
| Preceded by Wilson Pope | Editor of The Star; 1930–1936 | Succeeded by Robin Cruikshank |
