= Geoffrey Tedstone =

English cricketer (born 1961)

Personal information
- Full name: Geoffrey Alan Tedstone
- Born: 19 January 1961 (age 65); Southport, Lancashire, England
- Batting: Right-handed
- Role: Wicket-keeper

Domestic team information
- Years: Team
- 1982–1988: Warwickshire
- 1989–1990: Gloucestershire

Career statistics
Competition	FC	List A
Matches	50	20
Runs scored	935	183
Batting average	16.12	26.14
100s/50s	0/4	0/1
Top score	67*	55*
Balls bowled
Wickets
Bowling average
5 wickets in innings
10 wickets in match
Best bowling
Catches/stumpings	82/14	12/2
- Source: Cricinfo, 28 July 2013

Geoffrey Tedstone (born 19 January 1961) is a former English cricketer. He played for Warwickshire between 1982 and 1988 and for Gloucestershire between 1989 and 1990.
