= Samuel Dugard =

English divine

Samuel Dugard (1645?–1697), was an English divine.

== Life ==
Dugard, son of Thomas Dugard, M.A., rector of Barford, Warwickshire, by Anne his wife, was born at Warwick in or about 1645, his father being at the time headmaster of Warwick Grammar School. At the beginning of 1661, when about sixteen years of age, he entered Trinity College, Oxford, as a commoner, but was admitted a scholar on 30 May 1662, and graduated B.A. on 20 October 1664. Then taking orders, he was elected to a fellowship in June 1667, proceeding M.A. on the following 31 October. He subsequently became rector of Forton, Staffordshire, and on 2 January 1696–7 was collated to the prebend of Pipa Minor alias Prees in Lichfield Cathedral.

He died at Forton in the spring of the same year. He left a family of five sons and five daughters. A street in Barford (Dugard Place) is named after this family.

== Works ==
Dugard published:

- The True Nature of the Divine Law, and of Disobedience thereunto; in Nine Discourses, tending to show, in the one a Loveliness, in the other a Deformity, by way of Dialogue between Theophilus and Eubulus, London, 1687.
- A Discourse concerning many Children, in which the Prejudices against a numerous Offspring are removed, and the Objections answered, in a Letter to a Friend, London, 1695.

Anthony Wood also ascribes to him The Marriages of Cousin Germans vindicated from the Censures of Unlawfulnesse and Inexpediency. Being a Letter written to his much Honour'd T. D. [without author's name], Oxford, 1673, and comments that it is "mostly taken, as 'tis said, from Dr. Jer. Taylor's book called Ductor Dubitantium, &c." In November 1674 Dugard sent to Ralph Bathurst, then vice-chancellor of Oxford, a Relation concerning a strange Kind of Bleeding in a Little Child at Lilleshall in Shropshire, which was printed in Philosophical Transactions.
