= John Hacking (cricketer) =

English cricketer (1909–1999)

Personal information
- Full name: John Kenneth Hacking
- Born: 21 March 1909; Kenilworth, Warwickshire, England
- Died: 3 August 1999 (aged 90); Warwick, Warwickshire, England
- Batting: Right-handed
- Bowling: Right-arm medium

Domestic team information
- Years: Team
- 1946: Warwickshire

Career statistics
Competition	First-class
Matches	1
Runs scored	17
Batting average	8.50
100s/50s	–/–
Top score	14
Balls bowled	–
Wickets	–
Bowling average	–
5 wickets in innings	–
10 wickets in match	–
Best bowling	–
Catches/stumpings	2/–
- Source: Cricinfo, 7 May 2012

John Kenneth Hacking (21 March 1909 – 3 August 1999) was an English cricketer. Hacking was a right-handed batsman who bowled right-arm medium pace. He was born at Kenilworth, Warwickshire, and was educated at Warwick School.

Hacking made a single first-class appearance for Warwickshire against Lancashire at Old Trafford in the 1946 County Championship. Warwickshire won the toss and elected to bat, making just 100 all out in their first-innings, with Hacking who batted at number seven scoring 14 runs before he was dismissed by Eddie Phillipson. Lancashire responded in their first-innings with 292 all out, to which Warwickshire responded to in their second-innings with 232 all out, with Hacking making 3 runs batting at number six, before he was dismissed by William Roberts. Lancashire went on to win the match by 9 wickets. This was his only major appearance for Warwickshire.

He died at Warwick, Warwickshire, on 3 August 1999.
