= The Star (1888–1960) =

London evening newspaper published from 1888 to 1960

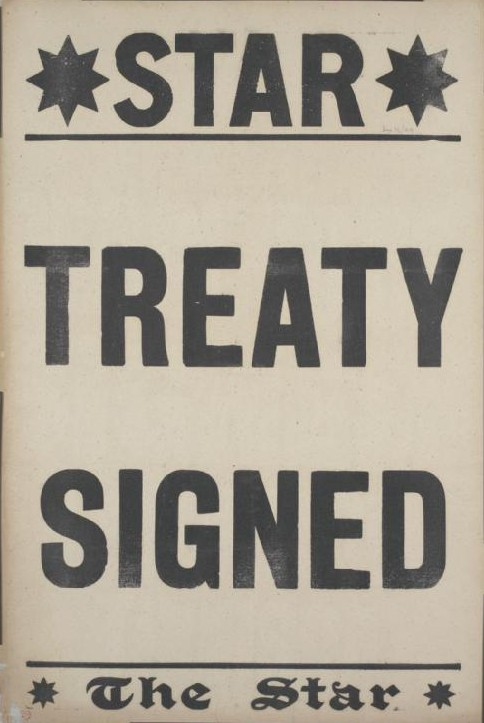
- Placard for The Star announcing signing of the Treaty of Versailles, 28 June 1919
- Type: Daily
- Founder: T. P. O'Connor
- Launched: 1888
- Ceased publication: 1960
- Language: English
- Headquarters: London, England
- City: London
- Country: England

The Star was a London evening newspaper founded in 1888. It ceased publication in 1960 when it was merged with the Evening News, as part of the same takeover that saw the News Chronicle absorbed into the Daily Mail. For some years afterward, the merged paper was called The Evening News and Star.

== Editors ==
1888: T. P. O'Connor
1890: Henry W. Massingham
1891: Ernest Parke
1908: James Douglas
1920: Wilson Pope
1930: Edward Chattaway
1936: Robin Cruickshank
1941: Arthur Leslie Cranfield
1957: Ralph McCarthy

== Jack the Ripper ==
The Star achieved early prominence and high circulation by sensationalising the Whitechapel murders of 1888–1891. Some suspect that one of its journalists wrote the Dear Boss letter that gave Jack the Ripper his name to boost circulation numbers.

The 2025 British documentary series Jack the Ripper: Written in Blood explores the team of reporters from the newspaper who helped fuel the legend.
