= Canadian Red Cross Memorial Hospital =

Former hospital in England

Coordinates: 51.5515°N 0.6838°W

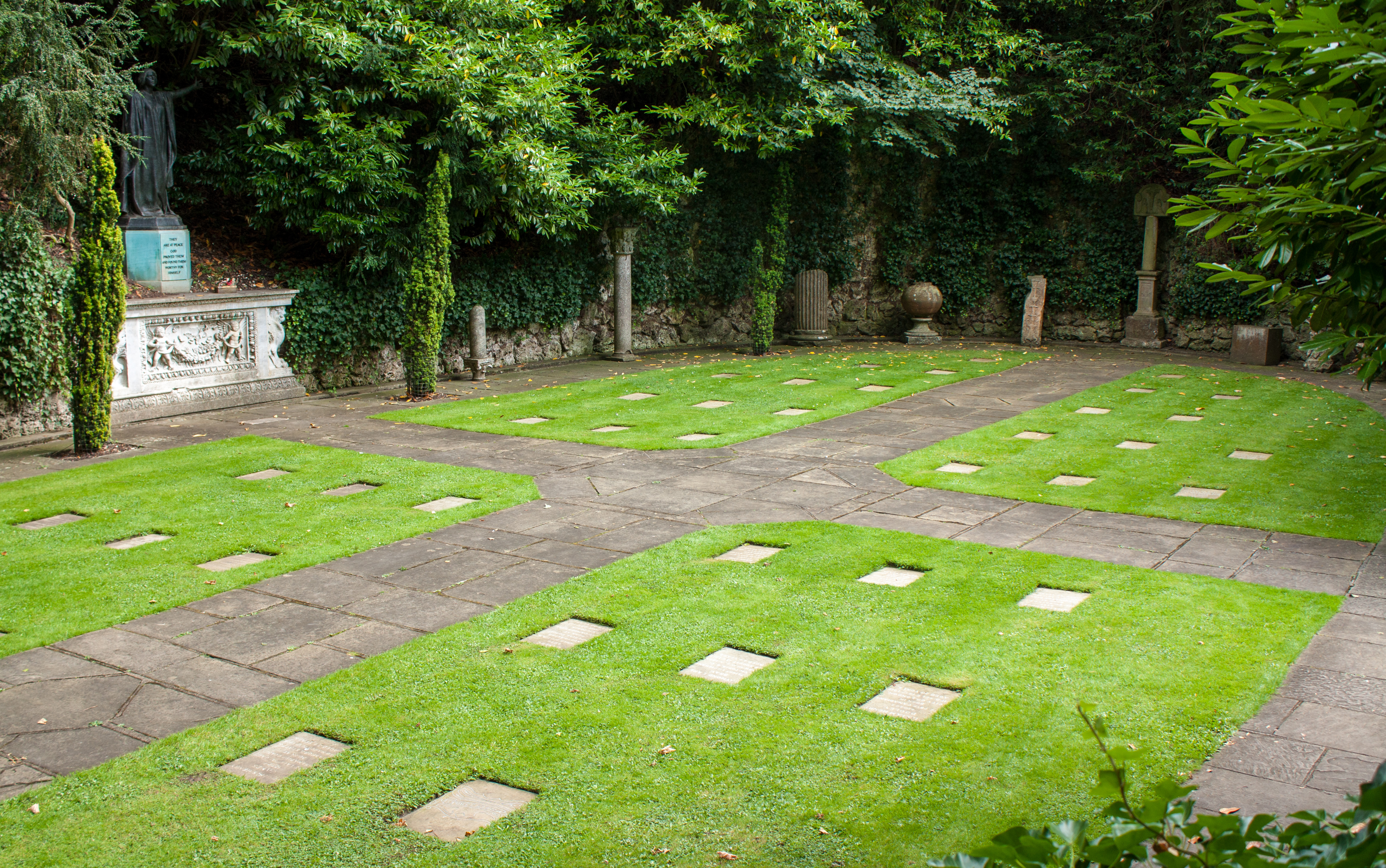
- Canadian War Memorial Garden, all that remains of the hospital

- Shown in Buckinghamshire

Geography
- Location: Taplow, England, United Kingdom

Organisation
- Care system: Public NHS
- Type: Public

Services
- Emergency department: No Accident & Emergency

History
- Founded: 1914
- Closed: 1985

Links
- Lists: Hospitals in England

The Canadian Red Cross Memorial Hospital in Taplow, Buckinghamshire, was a civilian hospital and a centre for research into rheumatism in children until its closure in 1985.

== History ==
=== War time origins ===
In 1914, during the First World War, the Astor family invited the Canadian Red Cross to build a military hospital on part of the Cliveden estate. The Red Cross built a small hospital, the HRH Duchess of Connaught Hospital, on the site. It was named after the Duchess of Connaught who had served as Viceregal consort of Canada.

In the Second World War, the Canadian Red Cross demolished many of the existing buildings to make way for a new, larger hospital with more equipment; this was named the Canadian Red Cross Memorial Hospital.

=== General Hospital ===
After the war the hospital was donated to the British Government for use as a general hospital and research centre into rheumatism in children. After opening to the public in 1947, it came under the supervision of the newly formed National Health Service. The hospital also developed a large maternity unit at this time.

The painter Stanley Spencer, who lived in nearby Cookham, died in the hospital in 1959 from cancer, having undergone an unsuccessful operation there the year before. Dr Barbara Ansell, the founder of paediatric rheumatology, worked at the hospital from the 1960s through to the 1980s.

=== Closure ===
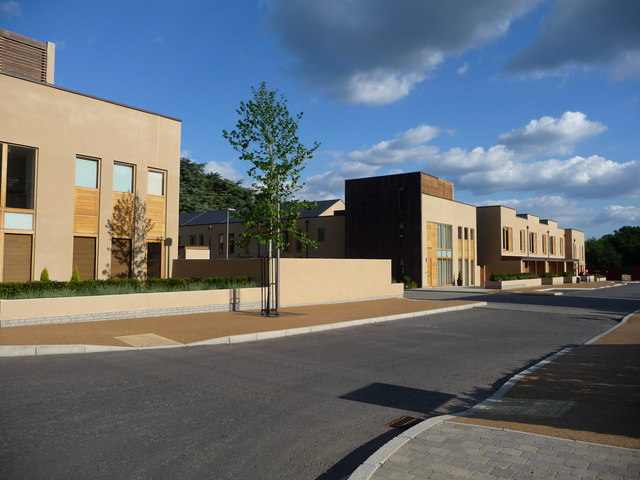
Cliveden Village on site of former Canadian Red Cross Memorial Hospital

The hospital closed and was abandoned in 1985 and lay derelict for two decades while the National Trust, who owned the site since 1942, explored options for its development. Many pieces of the hospital's old equipment lay there for years. It was demolished in 2006 to make way for a housing development for people aged 55 and over called Cliveden Village.
