= Josiah Court =

English physician

Sir Josiah Court LRCP MRCS
- Born: 17 January 1841; Warwick, Warwickshire, England
- Died: 8 February 1938 (aged 97)
- Occupation: Physician

Sir Josiah Court (17 January 1841 – 8 February 1938) was an English physician who determined the cause of miners' nystagmus and was responsible for greatly reducing the incidence of the disease, which causes partial or total blindness.

Court was born in Warwick and educated at Warwick School in that town. He trained at Guy's Hospital and became MRCS in 1863 and LRCP in 1864. He practised in Staveley, Derbyshire, and was consulting surgeon to the Derbyshire Miners' Union. It was here that he discovered that the nystagmus was caused by poor lighting in the mines and persuaded the owners to install proper lighting to supplement the miners' lamps. He also worked on ankylostomiasis and published the influential book Miners' Diseases.

He unsuccessfully contested Derbyshire North-East as a Unionist candidate six times.

Court was knighted in the 1920 New Year Honours for his services to miners.
