= Simon Cheshire =

British writer of children's literature

Simon Cheshire (born 1 June 1964) is a British writer, often in the genres of horror and science fiction. For over 20 years he wrote for the children's/ educational market, with over 70 published works including the Saxby Smart detective series and the SWARM techno-spy series. His first book, published in 1997, was Jeremy Brown of the Secret Service. Many of his books are for the 8 to 12 age range but some, such as the romantic comedy Plastic Fantastic, are for teens, while the horror novel Flesh and Blood is for older teens and adults.

In 2020, he left the children's market and now writes speculative fiction under the pen name Richard Gadz, including the highly-acclaimed novels The Burn Street Haunting and The Eater Of Flies.

== Biography ==
Simon Cheshire was born in Leamington Spa, Warwickshire. At the time, his father was a bus driver and his mother an office cleaner. He gained a degree in Philosophy and Psychology from the University of Hull. He is married, has a son and a daughter, and lives in Bristol.

== Books as Richard Gadz ==
- The Workshop Of Filthy Creation (2021)
- The Burn Street Haunting (2023)
- The Eater Of Flies (2024)
- The House Of All Sorrows (2025)
- Thank You For Staring Into The Void, Your Scream Is Important To Us: short stories (2025)

== Books as Simon Cheshire ==
- They Melted His Brain! (1999)
- Totally Unsuitable for Children (2000)
- Dirty Rotten Tricks (2000) (reissued as Bottomby in 2010)
- Kissing Vanessa (2003)
- Plastic Fantastic (2004)
- The Prince and the Snowgirl (2006)
- Pants on Fire (2010)
- The Book of the Nearly Dead (2010)
- Me and My Big Mouse (2011)
- Deadline (2011)
- The Frightfuls (2011)
- Sam's Home-Made Brain Scrambler (2012)
- Airlock (2014)
- Underworld (2014)
- Flesh and Blood (2015)

=== Jeremy Brown ===
The Jeremy Brown series focus on the homonymous character, a schoolboy who is secretly an MI7 agent, and his fierce sidekick, Patsy Spudd.

1. Jeremy Brown of the Secret Service (1997)
2. Jeremy Brown and the Mummy's Curse (1998)
3. Jeremy Brown on Mars (1998)
4. Jeremy Brown: Spy (omnibus) (2010)

=== Saxby Smart: private detective ===
Saxby Smart is a schoolkid private detective who works out of his garden shed solving mysteries brought to him by the children of the neighbourhood. As with the Encyclopedia Brown series, the books are divided into a number of cases and the reader is encouraged to solve the mysteries alongside the detective.

1. The Curse of the Ancient Mask (2007)
2. The Fangs of the Dragon (2008)
3. The Pirate's Blood (2008)
4. The Hangman's Lair (2008)
5. The Eye of the Serpent (2009)
6. Five Seconds to Doomsday (2009)
7. The Poisoned Arrow (2009)
8. The Treasure of Dead Man's Lane (2010 - U.S. retitle of The Fangs of the Dragon)
9. The Secret of the Skull (2010)
10. Saxby Smart's Detective Handbook (2010 - Non-fiction)

=== SWARM ===
The SWARM are intelligent robotic bugs who work with their human teammates to gather information and avert potential disasters.

1. Operation Sting (2014)
2. Project Venom (2014)
3. Code Name Firestorm (2015)
4. Target Silverclaw (2015)

=== Non-fiction ===
- You've Got to Read This: A Beginner's Guide to Great Writers and the History of Books (2011)
- How to Write a Story (2014)
- How to Get a Grip on Grammar (2015)
- How to Be a Snappy Speller (2016)
