= Jack Marshall (cricketer) =

English cricketer

John Maurice Alex Marshall (26 October 1916 – 19 March 2000) was an English cricketer who played first-class cricket in 29 matches for Warwickshire and the Marylebone Cricket Club (MCC) between 1946 and 1956. He was born in Kenilworth, Warwickshire and died at Warwick.

A Warwickshire schoolmaster, Jack Marshall was a right-arm leg-spin bowler and a right-handed lower order batsman who played first-class cricket as an amateur for Warwickshire in the seasons after the Second World War. His only season of regular cricket was the dislocated 1946 season, when he took 43 wickets as foil or deputy to the established Eric Hollies. These included his career-best figures of five Worcestershire wickets for 65 runs in his very first match. His lower-order batting was often useful, though he was consistent rather than spectacular: a career average of 17 runs per innings, with very few not out innings to swell the average, went alongside a highest score of just 47.

After 1946, when he was awarded his county cap, he played only occasional matches for Warwickshire through to 1950, without success; he returned to first-class cricket for a single game in 1956 for MCC against Ireland.
