= List of Combined Services (United Kingdom) cricketers =

The Combined Services cricket team played first-class cricket between 1920 and 1964, featuring in 63 fixtures. The team was made up of cricketers who were serving in the three branches of the British Armed Forces: the British Army, Royal Navy, and Royal Air Force. Throughout the cricket season, the Combined Services regularly played against county opposition and touring teams. In the team's 63 first-class fixtures, 226 different cricketers appeared for the Combined Services. During the period of National Service, the Combined Services were often able to field a strong team of young players who were already associated with a first-class county. Following the formal end of National Service in the United Kingdom in 1960, the Combined Services invariably fielded weaker teams, having lost access to a pool of young county cricketers.

The details are the player's usual name, the years in which he played first-class matches for one of the teams, and his name as it would appear on a modern match scorecard.

== A ==
- Michael Ainsworth (1946–1948) : M. L. Y. Ainsworth
- David Allen (1955) : D. A. Allen
- Keith Andrew (1952) : K. V. Andrew
- Arthur Archdale (1920–1921) : A. S. Archdale
- William Ashmore (1948) : W. S. Ashmore
- Bill Atkins (1958–1959) : G. Atkins
- Graham Atkinson (1957–1958) : G. Atkinson

== B ==
- John Baker (1956) : J. Baker
- William Barber (1946) : W. L. F. Barber
- Gerald Barry (1922) : G. Barry
- John Bartlett (1947–1948) : J. N. Bartlett
- Edward Bartley (1924–1931) : E. L. D. Bartley
- Michael Barton (1946) : M. R. Barton
- John Baskervyle-Glegg (1962) : J. Baskervyle-Glegg
- Ian Bedford (1949) : P. I. Bedford
- Charles Blount (1920–1924) : C. H. B. Blount
- Richard Borgnis (1937) : R. P. Borgnis
- Frank Boys (1947–1951) : F. C. Boys
- Kenneth Briggs (1961) : K. R. Briggs
- Francis Brooke (1920–1921) : F. R. R. Brooke
- Dallas Brooks (1920–1931) : R. A. D. Brooks
- Andrew Brown (1960) : A. J. T. Brown
- Tony Brown (1956) : A. S. Brown
- Godfrey Bryan (1924) : G. J. Bryan
- Montagu Brocas Burrows (1921–1931) : M. B. Burrows
- Tony Buss (1961–1962) : A. Buss

== C ==
- Iain Campbell (1947) : I. P. Campbell
- Noel Carbutt (1920–1921) : N. J. O. Carbutt
- Donald Carr (1946) : D. B. Carr
- Ray Carter (1952) : R. G. Carter
- Tom Cartwright (1955) : T. W. Cartwright
- Simon Clarke (1958) : S. J. S. Clarke
- Geoff Clayton (1957) : G. Clayton
- Brian Close (1950–1951) : D. B. Close
- Eric Cole (1937) : E. S. Cole
- Rex Collinge (1962) : R. A. Collinge
- Bernie Constable (1946) : B. Constable
- Arthur Coomb (1948–1949) : A. G. Coomb
- Michael Cowan (1955) : M. J. Cowan
- Len Creese (1946) : W. C. L. Creese
- Harry Crick (1949) : H. Crick

== D ==
- John Daniels (1964) : J. G. U. Daniels
- Emrys Davies (1946) : D. E. Davies
- Jack Davies (1946) : J. G. W. Davies
- Percy Davis (1946) : P. V. Davis
- George Dawkes (1947) : G. O. Dawkes
- John Deighton (1947–1962) : J. H. G. Deighton
- Peter Delisle (1958) : G. P. S. Delisle
- Louis Devereux (1950–1951) : L. N. Devereux
- John Dewes (1946–1947) : J. G. Dewes
- William Dickinson (1920–1921) : W. V. D. Dickinson
- Michael Dunning (1962–1964) : M. L. Dunning
- Neil Durden-Smith (1961) : N. Durden-Smith

== E ==
- Richard Earnshaw (1960–1961) : R. O. Earnshaw
- John Edrich (1956–1957) : J. H. Edrich
- Bernard Elgood (1948) : B. C. Elgood
- Alfred Evans (1920) : A. E. Evans

== F ==
- John Fawkes (1959–1960) : J. Fawkes
- Maurice Fenner (1949–1964) : M. D. Fenner
- Godfrey Firbank (1922) : G. C. Firbank
- Eric Fisk (1950–1951) : E. Fisk
- Ronnie Ford (1946–1949) : W. R. Ford
- William Foster (1964) : W. J. Foster
- Robert St Leger Fowler (1921–1924) : R. S. Fowler

== G ==
- Bob Gale (1955) : R. A. Gale
- David Gay (1949) : D. W. M. Gay
- Albert Gillespie (1937) : A. S. Gillespie
- Stephen Goldring (1964) : S. Goldring
- Adrian Gore (1924–1931) : A. C. Gore
- David Green (1956) : D. J. Green
- Bill Greensmith (1949–1950) : W. T. Greensmith
- Lancelot Grove (1937) : L. T. Grove
- David Guard (1947) : D. R. Guard

== H ==
- Norman Haggett (1962–1964) : N. L. Haggett
- Tom Hall (1954) : T. A. Hall
- Harry Halliday (1946) : H. Halliday
- Reginald Hammond (1948–1951) : R. J. L. Hammond
- Evan Hardy (1959) : E. M. P. Hardy
- Gerald Harrison (1920) : G. C. Harrison
- Leo Harrison (1946) : L. Harrison
- Peter Hatch (1960–1961) : P. G. Hatch
- Basil Hayles (1947–1949) : B. R. M. Hayles
- Robert Healey (1964) : R. D. Healey
- Peter Hearn (1947) : P. Hearn
- David Heath (1951–1952) : D. M. W. Heath
- Eric Hewitt (1957) : E. J. Hewitt
- Geoffrey Hill (1957) : G. H. Hill
- Philip Hodgson (1956–1957) : P. Hodgson
- Deric Holland-Martin (1937) : D. D. E. Holland-Martin
- John Holman (1962–1964) : J. C. Holman
- Martin Horton (1953–1954) : M. J. Horton
- Christopher Howland (1956) : C. B. Howland
- Reginald Hudson (1937) : R. E. H. Hudson

== I ==
- Ray Illingworth (1952) : R. Illingworth
- Colin Ingleby-Mackenzie (1953) : A. C. D. Ingleby-Mackenzie

== J ==
- Tom Jameson (1920–1924) : T. O. Jameson
- Julian Jefferson (1922) : J. A. D. Jefferson
- Johnnie Johnson (1947) : F. S. R. Johnson
- Peter Johnson (1950) : P. L. Johnson
- Alan Jones (1959) : A. Jones

== K ==
- Don Kenyon (1946) : D. Kenyon
- Simon Kimmins (1950) : S. E. A. Kimmins
- Barry Knight (1957–1958) : B. R. Knight

== L ==
- Richard Langridge (1959–1960) : R. J. Langridge
- Michael Laws (1946) : M. L. Laws
- Stan Leadbetter (1956–1957) : S. A. Leadbetter
- Stuart Leary (1955–1956) : S. E. Leary
- Tony Lewis (1958–1959) : A. R. Lewis
- Albert Lightfoot (1955) : A. Lightfoot
- Joseph Lister (1951) : J. Lister
- Tony Lock (1948) : G. A. R. Lock
- Brian Luckhurst (1960) : B. W. Luckhurst
- Ian Lumsden (1948–1949) : I. J. M. Lumsden

== M ==
- Tony Mallett (1946) : A. W. H. Mallett
- John Manners (1947–1953) : J. E. Manners
- Peter Marner (1954–1955) : P. T. Marner
- Algernon Marsham (1946) : A. J. B. Marsham
- Robert Martin (1951) : R. H. Martin
- Colin Matthews (1955) : C. S. Matthews
- Peter May (1948–1949) : P. H. B. May
- Barney McCall (1948) : B. E. W. McCall
- Alfred McGaw (1931) : A. J. T. McGaw
- Terence McIntyre (1959–1964) : T. F. McIntyre
- Gordon McKinna (1955) : G. H. McKinna
- Douglas Meakin (1959–1962) : D. Meakin
- Robert Melsome (1931–1931) : R. G. W. Melsome
- Geoff Millman (1956) : G. Millman
- John Mortimore (1952–1953) : J. B. Mortimore
- Alan Moss (1951) : A. E. Moss
- Roger Moylan-Jones (1964) : R. E. Moylan-Jones
- Altaff Mungrue (1964) : A. A. Mungrue
- Edward Murphy (1948) : E. G. Murphy
- John Murray (1954–1955) : J. T. Murray
- Mike Murray (1949) : M. P. Murray
- Rowland Musson (1937) : R. G. Musson

== N ==
- David Newsom (1960–1961) : D. J. Newsom

== O ==
- Alan Oakman (1949) : A. S. M. Oakman
- Michael Osborne (1961–1962) : M. J. Osborne

== P ==
- Doug Padgett (1953–1954) : D. E. V. Padgett
- Peter Parfitt (1957–1958) : P. H. Parfitt
- Frederick Parker (1946) : F. A. V. Parker
- Roland Parker (1947) : R. J. Parker
- Jim Parks (1951–1952) : J. M. Parks
- Alan Parnaby (1949–1953) : A. H. Parnaby
- Brian Parsons (1956–1957) : A. B. D. Parsons
- Wilfred Payton (1947–1953) : W. E. G. Payton
- Bob Peach (1960) : R. A. Peach
- Derek Pearson (1957) : D. B. Pearson
- Richard Peck (1960–1962) : R. L. Peck
- Reg Perks (1946) : R. T. D. Perks
- Paddy Phelan (1959–1960) : P. J. Phelan
- David Phipps (1964) : D. D. Phipps
- John Pitt (1957) : J. A. Pitt
- Bob Platt (1956) : R. K. Platt
- Dick Pollard (1946) : R. Pollard
- David Pratt (1961) : D. Pratt
- Rodney Pratt (1958–1959) : R. L. Pratt
- Barry Pryer (1946–1947) : B. J. K. Pryer

== R ==
- John Rawlence (1950) : J. R. Rawlence
- Alan Rayment (1947) : A. W. H. Rayment
- Harold Rhodes (1956) : H. J. Rhodes
- Peter Richardson (1954–1955) : P. E. Richardson
- Fred Roberts (1946–1949) : J. F. Roberts
- William Robins (1937) : W. V. H. Robins
- Keith Robinson (1961) : K. Robinson
- Maurice Robinson (1946) : M. Robinson
- Brian Roe (1959–1960) : B. Roe
- Francis Rogers (1924) : F. G. Rogers

== S ==
- Peter Sainsbury (1954) : P. J. Sainsbury
- John Sayer (1950–1952) : J. D. Sayer
- Malcolm Scott (1958) : M. E. Scott
- Kenneth Sellar (1931) : K. A. Sellar
- Derek Semmence (1957–1958) : D. J. Semmence
- Eric Senior (1961) : E. M. Senior
- Phil Sharpe (1956–1957) : P. J. Sharpe
- Robert Shaw (1931–1937) : R. J. Shaw
- Alan Shirreff (1946–1957) : A. C. Shirreff
- Frank Simpson (1948) : F. W. Simpson
- Duncan Smith (1947) : D. Smith
- Sidney Smith (1950–1951) : S. Smith
- Terry Spencer (1953–1954) : C. T. Spencer
- Kenneth Standring (1957–1958) : K. B. Standring
- Colin Stansfield Smith (1952–1953) : S. Stansfield Smith
- Ronald Stanyforth (1922) : R. T. Stanyforth
- Barry Stead (1960–1961) : B. Stead
- Roy Stevens (1962) : R. G. Stevens
- Ronald Stevenson (1962) : R. L. Stevenson
- Bryan Stott (1955–1956) : W. B. Stott
- Raman Subba Row (1956–1957) : R. Subba Row
- Roy Swetman (1953) : R. Swetman

== T ==
- Anthony Thackara (1949–1955) : A. L. S. S. Thackara
- Joe Thewlis (1962) : J. Thewlis
- Roly Thompson (1952) : R. G. Thompson
- David Thorne (1964) : D. C. Thorne
- Edward Thornton (1922) : E. Thornton
- Fred Titmus (1951) : F. J. Titmus
- Gerry Tordoff (1953–1962) : G. G. Tordoff
- Fred Trueman (1953) : F. S. Trueman

== U ==
- Arthur Underwood (1950–1951) : A. J. Underwood

== V ==
- Geoffrey Vavasour (1947) : G. W. Vavasour
- John Vernon (1949–1952) : J. M. Vernon
- Roy Virgin (1961) : R. T. Virgin
- Bill Voce (1946) : W. Voce

== W ==
- Alan Waldron (1948) : A. N. E. Waldron
- Chris Walton (1953) : A. C. Walton
- George Watson (1946) : G. S. Watson
- Bomber Wells (1953) : B. D. Wells
- Michael White (1947–1948) : W. M. E. White
- William White (1922) : W. N. White
- John Whitehead (1947) : J. P. Whitehead
- John Wild (1956) : J. Wild
- Alexander Wilkinson (1920–1931) : W. A. C. Wilkinson
- Charles Williams (1956) : C. C. P. Williams
- Dennis Williams (1959–1964) : D. S. Williams
- Edward Williams (1922–1931) : E. S. B. Williams
- Leo Williams (1931) : L. Williams
- Peter Williams (1920–1921) : P. V. Williams
- Roy Williams (1960) : N. R. Williams
- John Williamson (1958) : J. G. Williamson
- Alec Wills (1937) : A. P. S. Wills
- Bernard Willson (1964) : B. J. Willson
- Robert Wilson (1948–1952) : R. G. Wilson
- George Woodhouse (1947) : G. E. S. Woodhouse
- Michael Wrigley (1946) : M. H. Wrigley

== Y ==
- Rex Yeatman (1946) : R. H. Yeatman
