= Meakin =

Meakin is a surname. Notable people with the surname include:

- Alf Meakin (1938–2025), British track and field athlete and rugby league footballer
- Breanne Meakin (in marriage Breanne Knapp) (born 1990), Canadian female curler
- Douglas Meakin (1929–1998), English cricketer
- Harry Meakin (1919–1986), footballer who played in The Football League for Stoke City
- Lewis Henry Meakin (1850–1917), American Impressionist landscape artist born in Newcastle, England, moving to Cincinnati, Ohio in 1863
- Peter Meakin, Australian journalist and the head of news and current affairs at the Seven Network
- Rob Meakin (born 1964), Canadian curler and coach
- Zac Meakin (born 2006), British-Ukrainian racing driver

== See also ==
- J. & G. Meakin, English pottery manufacturing company founded in 1851 and based in Hanley, Stoke-on-Trent, Staffordshire
- Mohan Meakin Brewery, large group of companies started with Asia's first brewery incorporated in 1855
- Janet Meakin Poor (1929–2017), landscape design specialist based out of Winnetka, Illinois
