= William Foster (Scottish cricketer) =

Scottish cricketer and Royal Marines officer

Personal information
- Full name: William John Foster
- Born: 3 February 1934 (age 92); Glasgow, Lanarkshire, Scotland
- Batting: Right-handed
- Bowling: Slow left-arm orthodox

Career statistics
Competition	First-class
Matches	2
Runs scored	79
Batting average	19.75
100s/50s	–/–
Top score	36
Balls bowled	18
Wickets	0
Bowling average	–
5 wickets in innings	–
10 wickets in match	–
Best bowling	–
Catches/stumpings	1/–
- Source: Cricinfo, 15 March 2019

William John Foster (born 3 February 1934) is a Scottish former first-class cricketer and Royal Marines officer.

Foster was born at Glasgow and was educated in England at Harrow School. He was commissioned into the Royal Marines as a second lieutenant in November 1952. He was made an acting lieutenant in April 1954, with promotion to the full rank of lieutenant in May 1956. He was promoted to the rank of captain in January 1964. Foster made two appearances in first-class cricket for the Combined Services cricket team in 1964, playing against Cambridge University at Uxbridge, and Oxford University at Aldershot. He scored a total of 79 runs in his two matches, with a high score of 36.
