= McKinna =

McKinna is a surname. Notable people with the surname include:

- Gordon McKinna (1930–2007) English cricketer and amateur footballer
- John McKinna (1906–2000), Australian brigadier
- Lawrie McKinna (born 1961), Scottish-Australian footballer, coach, and politician
- Sophie McKinna (born 1994), British athlete
