= John Holman (British Army officer) =

English cricketer and British Army officer

- Born: 5 April 1938; Calcutta, Bengal Province, British India
- Died: 7 October 2011 (aged 73); Hythe, Kent, England
- Burial place: Shorncliffe Military Cemetery
- Military career
- Allegiance: United Kingdom
- Branch: British Army
- Service years: 1958–1993
- Rank: Brigadier
- Service number: 457182
- Commands: 2nd Infantry Brigade; 1st Battalion (Queen's Surreys)
- Conflicts: Cyprus Emergency; Indonesia–Malaysia confrontation The Troubles
- Awards: Commander of the Order of the British Empire

Brigadier John Charles Holman, CBE, DL (5 April 1938 – 7 October 2011) was an English first-class cricketer and British Army officer. Serving in the Royal West Kent Regiment and its successor, The Queen's Regiment, Holman served in the British Army from 1958 to 1993, reaching the rank of brigadier. He also played first-class cricket for the Combined Services cricket team in the early 1960s.

== Life and military career ==
The son of a colonial policeman, Holman was born at Calcutta in what was then British India. He was educated in England at Tonbridge School from 1951 to 1956. From Tonbridge he studied at the Royal Military Academy Sandhurst, graduating into the Royal West Kent Regiment as a second lieutenant in August 1958. Holman first saw action in Cyprus against EOKA during the Cyprus Emergency in 1959. He was promoted to lieutenant in August 1960. Holman played first-class cricket for the Combined Services cricket team. He made his debut against Cambridge University at Fenner's in 1962, before making a second appearance against the same opposition at Uxbridge. A right-handed batsman, he scored 39 runs in these matches, with a highest score of 17. In August 1964, he was promoted to the rank of captain. After 1966, the Royal West Kent Regiment was amalgamated into The Queen's Regiment, which Holman continued to serve in. He served in Borneo during the Indonesia–Malaysia confrontation.

Holman was promoted to major in January 1971, and lieutenant colonel in June 1977. He served as the commanding officer of the 1st Battalion (Queen's Surreys) in Northern Ireland, for which he was appointed an Officer of the Order of the British Empire in the 1980 New Year Honours. He was appointed as deputy colonel of The Queen's Regiment in January 1984. In June of the same year, he was promoted to colonel. He was appointed a Commander of the Order of the British Empire in the 1987 New Year Honours. His tenure as deputy colonel of The Queen's Regiment expired in January 1989, with Colonel Richard Harold Graham replacing him. He was promoted to brigadier in December 1989, with seniority from June 1989. As a brigadier he commanded the 2nd Infantry Brigade at Shorncliffe, as well as held the post of deputy constable of Dover Castle in 1989. Holman retired from military service in April 1993, at which point he was appointed to the Reserve of Officers.

Holman served as a Deputy Lieutenant of Kent in 1996. Later in his life he was the chairman of the Hythe Festival and the Hythe Civic Society. He successfully underwent treatment for Hodgkin's lymphoma, but after a prolonged period of remission the disease returned, with Holman succumbing to the disease on 7 October 2011. He was buried at the Shorncliffe Military Cemetery. Following his death, a strip of parkland in Hythe running alongside the Royal Military Canal was renamed Holman's Field in his honour.
