= Chris Walton =

Chris Walton may refer to:

- Chris Walton (cricketer) (1933–2006), English cricketer
- Chris Walton (businessman) (born 1957), chairman of KazMunayGas and former CFO of Easyjet
