= Rawlence =

Rawlence is a surname. Notable people with the surname include:

- Ben Rawlence, British writer
- John Rawlence (1915–1983), British cricketer

== See also ==
- Lawrence (surname)
