= Altaff Mungrue =

Trinidadian-born English cricketer and Royal Air Force airman

Personal information
- Full name: Altaff Ali Mungrue
- Born: 26 August 1934; Port of Spain, Trinidad
- Died: 11 December 2015 (aged 81); Maidenhead, Berkshire, England
- Batting: Right-handed
- Bowling: Right-arm off break Right-arm medium

Career statistics
| Competition | First-class |
|---|---|
| Matches | 2 |
| Runs scored | 102 |
| Batting average | 25.50 |
| 100s/50s | 0/1 |
| Top score | 51 |
| Balls bowled | 246 |
| Wickets | 8 |
| Bowling average | 16.12 |
| 5 wickets in innings | 0 |
| 10 wickets in match | 0 |
| Best bowling | 4/58 |
| Catches/stumpings | 0/– |
- Source: Cricinfo, 9 March 2019

Altaff Ali Mungrue (25 August 1934 – 11 December 2015) was a Trinidadian-born English first-class cricketer and Royal Air Force airman.

Mungrue was born at Port of Spain and later emigrated to England, where he enlisted in the Royal Air Force (RAF). While serving in the RAF, Mungrue played first-class cricket for the Combined Services cricket team in 1964, making two appearances against Cambridge University at Uxbridge, and Oxford University at Aldershot. He scored 102 runs in these two matches, with a high score of 51, which came against Cambridge University. With his mixture of right-arm off break and medium pace bowling, Mungrue took 8 wickets at 16.12 in these two matches, with best figures of 4 for 58. He played minor matches while serving in both Singapore and Malaya in 1960–61.

Altaff died in December 2015 at Maidenhead, Berkshire.
