= Dennis Williams (British Army officer) =

English cricketer and British Army officer

Personal information
- Full name: Dennis Stanley Williams
- Born: 15 November 1936; Sutton, London, England
- Died: 18 September 2013 (aged 76); England
- Batting: Right-handed
- Bowling: Left-arm medium

Domestic team information
- Years: Team
- 1958: Berkshire

Career statistics
Competition	First-class
Matches	8
Runs scored	225
Batting average	16.07
100s/50s	–/1
Top score	82
Catches/stumpings	6/–
- Source: Cricinfo, 14 February 2019

Dennis Stanley Williams (15 November 1936 – 18 September 2013) was an English first-class cricketer and British Army officer. Williams served in the Royal Artillery for 34 years, during which time he played first-class cricket for the Combined Services cricket team.

== Military career ==
Williams graduated from the Royal Military Academy Sandhurst in August 1957, entering into the Royal Artillery as a second lieutenant. He was promoted to the rank of lieutenant in August 1959, with promotion to captain coming in August 1963. He became a major in December 1968. In 1975, he gained the rank of lieutenant colonel, with promotion to colonel in June 1983. He gained his final promotion to brigadier in December 1987, with seniority to June 1987. He retired from military service in November 1991.

== First-class cricket ==
Williams made his debut in minor counties cricket for Berkshire in 1958, making two appearances in the Minor Counties Championship. He made his debut in first-class cricket in 1959 when he was selected to play for the Combined Services cricket team against Warwickshire at Birmingham. He played first-class cricket for the Combined Services until 1964, making a total of eight first-class appearances. Williams scored a total of 225 runs at an average of 16.07, with a high score of 82.
