= John Pitt (cricketer) =

English cricketer

Personal information
- Full name: John Anthony Pitt
- Born: 30 January 1937 (age 89); Dewsbury, Yorkshire, England
- Batting: Right-handed
- Bowling: Right-arm medium

Career statistics
Competition	First-class
Matches	1
Runs scored	36
Batting average	36.00
100s/50s	–/–
Top score	26*
Balls bowled	18
Wickets	0
Bowling average	–
5 wickets in innings	–
10 wickets in match	–
Best bowling	–
Catches/stumpings	1/–
- Source: Cricinfo, 19 March 2019

John Anthony Pitt (born 30 January 1937) is a former English first-class cricketer.

While undertaking his national service as a non-commissioned officer in the British Army, Pitt made a single appearance in first-class cricket for the Combined Services cricket team against Warwickshire at Birmingham in 1957. Batting twice in the match, Pitt scored 10 runs in the Combined Services first-innings before being dismissed by Michael Youll, while in their second-innings he remained unbeaten with 26 runs. He also bowled three overs with his right-arm medium pace in Warwickshire's first-innings, without taking a wicket.
