= Keith Robinson (cricketer) =

English cricketer (b1933)

Personal information
- Full name: Keith Robinson
- Born: 17 December 1933 (age 92); Thirsk, Yorkshire, England
- Batting: Unknown

Career statistics
Competition	First-class
Matches	1
Runs scored	18
Batting average	18.00
100s/50s	–/–
Top score	18
Catches/stumpings	–/–
- Source: Cricinfo, 7 March 2019

Keith Robinson (born 17 December 1933) is an English former first-class cricketer.

While serving in the Royal Navy, Robinson played a single first-class cricket match for the Combined Services cricket team against Northamptonshire in 1961 at Northampton. Batting once in the match, he scored 18 runs in the Combined Services before being dismissed by Malcolm Scott.
