= Bernard Willson (cricketer) =

English cricketer and Royal Air Force officer

Personal information
- Full name: Bernard John Willson
- Born: 20 June 1935; Strood, Kent, England
- Died: 14 February 1997 (aged 61)
- Nickname: Tug
- Batting: Right-handed
- Bowling: Left-arm medium

Career statistics
Competition	First-class
Matches	2
Runs scored	87
Batting average	21.75
100s/50s	–/1
Top score	53
Balls bowled	405
Wickets	7
Bowling average	28.14
5 wickets in innings	–
10 wickets in match	–
Best bowling	4/87
Catches/stumpings	2/–
- Source: Cricinfo, 12 September 2019

Bernard John "Tug" Willson (20 June 1935 - 14 February 1997) was an English former first-class cricketer and Royal Air Force officer.

Willson was born in June 1935 at Strood, Kent. He joined the Royal Air Force in February 1961, when he was commissioned as a cadet pilot. He was promoted to the rank of pilot officer in February 1962, with promotion to the rank of flying officer coming in February 1963, with seniority antedated to December 1961. He was selected to play for the Combined Services cricket team in 1964, making two first-class appearances against Cambridge University at Uxbridge, and Oxford University at Aldershot. He scored 87 runs in his two matches, with a high score of 53 against Oxford University. With his left-arm medium pace bowling, he took 7 wickets at a bowling average of 28.14 and best figures of 4 for 87. He was promoted to the rank of flight lieutenant in April 1966, with promotion to the rank of squadron leader in January 1972. Willson retired from active service in January 1975. He then moved to Hong Kong where he flew for Cathay Pacific and played cricket for Little Sai Wan as well as representing Hong Kong.
