= Admiral Jones =

Admiral Jones may refer to:

== United Kingdom ==
- Lewis Jones (Royal Navy officer) (1797–1895), British Royal Navy admiral
- Philip Jones (Royal Navy officer) (born 1960), British Royal Navy admiral
- Theophilus Jones (Royal Navy officer) (1760–1835), Irish-born Royal Navy admiral
- Theobald Jones (1790–1868), Irish-born Royal Navy admiral, Member of Parliament and lichenologist, nephew of Theophilus Jones
- William Gore Jones (1826–1888), British Royal Navy admiral

== United States ==
- Carl Henry Jones (1893–1958), U.S. Navy admiral
- Claud Ashton Jones (1885–1948), U.S. Navy rear admiral
- Don A. Jones (1912–2000), NOAA Commissioned Officer Corps rear admiral
- Donald S. Jones (1928–2004), U.S. Navy admiral
- Hilary P. Jones (1863–1938), U.S. Navy admiral

== Other ==
- George Jones (Canadian admiral) (1895–1946), Royal Canadian Navy vice admiral
- John Paul Jones (1747–1792), Scottish-American naval captain, later an Imperial Russian Navy rear admiral
- Peter Jones (admiral) (born 1957), Royal Australian Navy vice admiral
- Trevor Jones (admiral) (fl. 1970s–2010s), Royal Australian Navy rear admiral

== See also ==
- Everard Hardman-Jones (1881–1962), British Royal Navy vice admiral
- Roger Moylan-Jones (born 18 April 1940), British Royal Navy rear admiral
