= Ronnie Ford =

English cricketer and Royal Air Force officer

Personal information
- Full name: Walter Ronald Ford
- Born: 19 October 1913; Teddington, Middlesex, England
- Died: 7 October 1998 (aged 84); Midhurst, Sussex, England
- Batting: Right-handed
- Role: Wicket-keeper

Career statistics
Competition	First-class
Matches	4
Runs scored	69
Batting average	9.85
100s/50s	–/–
Top score	36
Catches/stumpings	7/–
- Source: Cricinfo, 19 February 2019

Walter Ronald Ford CBE (19 October 1913 – 7 October 1998) was an English first-class cricketer and Royal Air Force officer. Ford served with the Royal Air Force in a career that spanned from 1937 to 1965, playing first-class cricket for the Combined Services cricket team in the later 1940s.

== Military career and later life ==
Ford was born in Teddington. He joined the Royal Air Force before 1937, initially serving in the Equipment Branch, before being commissioned as a pilot officer in January 1937. His probation ended in January 1938, upon which he was promoted to flying officer. He served in the Royal Air Force during the Second World War, with promotion to the temporary rank of flight lieutenant coming in September 1940. He became a temporary squadron leader in September 1941, and was mentioned in dispatches in January 1943. He was later made a temporary wing commander, a rank he relinquished in November 1947.

Following the war, Ford played first-class cricket for the Combined Services cricket team, making four appearances as a wicket-keeper between 1946 and 1949. He scored 69 runs across his four first-class appearances, with a high score of 36 and an average of 9.85. Ford was made a Commander of the Order of the British Empire in the 1960 New Year Honours. He retired from active service at his request in October 1965, retaining the rank of group captain. He later worked for the Marylebone Cricket Club as its assistant secretary of administration from 1973 to 1977. He died at Midhurst in October 1998.
