= David Guard =

English cricketer (1928–1978)

Personal information
- Full name: David Radclyffe Guard
- Born: 19 May 1928; Romsey, Hampshire, England
- Died: 12 December 1978 (aged 50); Hartfield, Sussex, England
- Batting: Right-handed

Domestic team information
- Years: Team
- 1946–1949: Hampshire

Career statistics
Competition	First-class
Matches	16
Runs scored	430
Batting average	15.35
100s/50s	–/2
Top score	89
Catches/stumpings	8/–
- Source: Cricinfo, 14 February 2010

David Radclyffe Guard (19 May 1928 — 12 December 1978) was an English first-class cricketer.

Guard was born at Romsey in May 1928. He was educated at Winchester College, where he captained the college cricket team. He made his debut in first-class cricket shortly after completing his education at Winchester, debuting for Hampshire against Yorkshire at Scarborough in the 1946 County Championship. Guard made five appearances for Hampshire in 1946. From Winchester, he was commissioned into the Royal Hampshire Regiment as a second lieutenant in February 1948. Whilst a cadet prior to his commissioning, Guard made a single first-class appearance for the Combined Services cricket team against Worcestershire at Hereford in 1947. After playing for Hampshire in 1948 against Oxford University, Guard went on to make a further nine first-class appearances in 1949. Of note in 1949 was his innings of 89 against Glamorgan, which likely saved Hampshire from defeat. In total, Guard made sixteen appearances in first-class cricket. In these, he scored 430 runs at an average of 15.35, with two half centuries. Guard died suddenly on 12 December 1978 at Hartfield, Sussex.
