= Andrew Brown (cricketer, born 1935) =

Scottish cricketer (1935–2020)

Personal information
- Full name: Andrew John Trevor Brown
- Born: 27 June 1935; Edinburgh, Scotland
- Died: 16 June 2020 (aged 84)
- Batting: Left-handed
- Bowling: Right-arm off break

Domestic team information
- Years: Team
- 1961: Combined Services
- 1959-1961: Devon

Career statistics
Competition	First-class
Matches	2
Runs scored	41
Batting average	13.66
100s/50s	–/–
Top score	40*
Balls bowled	–
Wickets	–
Bowling average	–
5 wickets in innings	–
10 wickets in match	–
Best bowling	–
Catches/stumpings	1/–
- Source: Cricinfo, 8 March 2011

Andrew John Trevor Brown (27 June 1935 – 16 June 2020) was a Scottish cricketer and Royal Navy Engineering Officer. Brown was a left-handed batsman who bowled right-arm off break. He was born in Edinburgh.

The son of John Brown and Nesta Jones, Brown was educated at Sherborne School in Dorset, where he represented the school cricket team. Following the end of his education, he joined the Royal Navy whom he also played cricket for. Brown made his debut for Devon in the 1959 Minor Counties Championship against the Somerset Second XI. From 1959 to 1961, he represented the county in ten Championship matches, the last of which came against Cornwall.

Andrew Brown played two first-class matches for the Combined Services in 1961, against Cambridge University and the touring South Africans. In his two first-class matches he scored 41 runs at a batting average of 13.66, with a high score of 40* against Cambridge University.

Latterly, he played for Aberdeenshire from 1970 to 1974 and was Captain in 1973.

Following his retirement from the Royal Navy, Brown became an HR manager, and subsequently Director of Training at Brathay Hall, Cumbria. Married twice, Brown had three children. Latterly he lived in Banchory on Royal Deeside, and in his sixties coached junior cricketers at Banchory CC. He became a member of Durham CC to watch county cricket as well as local Aberdeenshire matches.
