= Evan Hardy =

English rugby union player and cricketer

Michael Hardy
- Born: Evan Michael Pearce Hardy; 13 November 1927 Meerut, Uttar Pradesh, India
- Died: 13 January 1994 (aged 66) Taunton, Somerset, England

Rugby union career
- Position: Fly-half
International career
Years	Team	Apps	(Points)
1951	England	3	(0)

Evan "Michael" Pearce Hardy (13 November 1927 – 13 January 1994) was an English rugby union player who represented the England national rugby union team. He also played for the Combined Services, the Army and Yorkshire County. He also played a first-class cricket match with the Combined Services and was a member of the MCC and I Zingari (IZ) clubs.

Playing as a fly half, India born Hardy was capped three times for England, all in the 1951 Five Nations Championship. Those matches were against Ireland, France and Scotland.

Hardy, a right-handed batsman, played some non first-class matches with the Army in 1950. His only first-class appearance came nine years later when he lined up for the Combined Services against Warwickshire in Birmingham. He made a duck in his debut innings when he was dismissed by Jack Bannister, with the Warwickshire paceman achieving the rare feat of claiming 10 wickets in an innings. In his second innings he made 15 before falling again to Bannister.

In his Army career he rose to became an officer in the Duke of Wellington's Regiment.
