= Bob Peach =

English cricketer

Personal information
- Full name: Robert Arthur Peach
- Born: 15 July 1937 (age 89); Marylebone, London, England
- Batting: Right-handed
- Bowling: Right-arm medium-fast

Career statistics
Competition	First-class
Matches	2
Runs scored	6
Batting average	–
100s/50s	–/–
Top score	6*
Balls bowled	30
Wickets	–
Bowling average	–
5 wickets in innings	–
10 wickets in match	–
Best bowling	–
Catches/stumpings	2/–
- Source: Cricinfo, 6 March 2019

Robert "Bob" Arthur Peach (born 15 July 1937) is an English former first-class cricketer.

While serving in the Royal Artillery, Peach played first-class cricket for the Combined Services cricket team in 1960, making two appearances against Cambridge University at Fenner's, and Surrey at The Oval. He scored 6 runs and took no wickets with his right-arm medium-fast bowling. Peach played his club cricket for South Hampstead, where captained the First XI between 1961–68 and later served on the club committee. In 2010, he was the representative for the London Federation for Sport and Recreation to the Middlesex Cricket Board.
