= Robert Martin (cricketer) =

English cricketer and Royal Navy officer

Personal information
- Full name: Robert Harold Martin
- Born: 7 October 1918; Liverpool, Lancashire, England
- Died: 30 June 1985 (aged 66); St Albans, Hertfordshire, England
- Batting: Right-handed
- Bowling: Right-arm medium

Career statistics
Competition	First-class
Matches	1
Runs scored	4
Batting average	2.00
100s/50s	–/–
Top score	4
Balls bowled	150
Wickets	1
Bowling average	91.00
5 wickets in innings	–
10 wickets in match	–
Best bowling	1/29
Catches/stumpings	–/–
- Source: Cricinfo, 5 March 2019

Robert Harold Martin (7 October 1918 – 30 June 1985) was an English first-class cricketer and Royal Navy officer.

Martin was born at Liverpool and was educated at Oundle School, where he played for the school cricket team. He enlisted in the Royal Navy as a temporary rank of sub-lieutenant in September 1939, a rank he still held in October 1942. He was mentioned in dispatches in December 1943. He was promoted to the temporary rank of lieutenant in December 1944, with seniority to October of that year. Following the war, he was promoted to the rank of lieutenant commander in January 1951, with seniority to March 1949.

In June 1951, Martin was selected to play for the Combined Services cricket team in a first-class cricket match against Worcestershire at Worcester. Batting twice in the match, Martin was dismissed for 4 runs by Roly Jenkins in the Combined Services first-innings, while following-on in their second-innings he was run out without scoring. With his right-arm medium pace, Martin bowled 19 wicketless overs conceding 62 runs in Worcestershire's first-innings, while in their second-innings took the only wicket to fall, dismissing Peter Richardson to finish with figures of 1 for 29 from six overs.

He died at St Albans in June 1985.
