= David Phipps =

English cricketer and British Army officer

Personal information
- Full name: Douglas David Phipps
- Born: 27 January 1934 (age 92); Edmonton, Middlesex, England
- Batting: Right-handed
- Bowling: Right-arm fast-medium

Domestic team information
- Years: Team
- 1964: Combined Services

Career statistics
Competition	First-class
Matches	1
Runs scored	15
Batting average	7.50
100s/50s	0/0
Top score	15
Balls bowled	90
Wickets	1
Bowling average	53.00
5 wickets in innings	0
10 wickets in match	0
Best bowling	1/53
Catches/stumpings	1/–
- Source: Cricinfo, 26 May 2011

Douglas David Phipps (born 27 July 1934) is a former English cricketer and British Army officer. Phipps was a right-handed batsman who bowled right-arm fast-medium. He was born in Edmonton, Middlesex. He was educated at Mill Hill School, before enlisting in the British Army, where he undertook training at the Royal Military Academy Sandhurst.

Phipps played for the Essex Second XI from 1956 to 1958. He made his only first-class appearance for a Combined Services team against Cambridge University in 1964. In this match, he was dismissed for a duck in the Combined Services first-innings by Roy Kerslake. In their second-innings, he scored 15 runs before being dismissed by the same bowler. With the ball, he took a single wicket, that of Tony Windows for the cost of 53 runs from 12 overs. He played various matches for Army and Combined Services teams from 1954 to 1969.
