= Roy Williams (cricketer) =

English cricketer (1931–2024)

Personal information
- Full name: Norman Roy Williams
- Born: 4 January 1931; March, Cambridgeshire, England
- Died: 27 March 2024 (aged 93); West Sussex, England
- Batting: Right-handed
- Bowling: Right-arm fast-medium

Domestic team information
- Years: Team
- 1951: Combined Services
- 1949–1951 & 1960–1964: Cambridgeshire

Career statistics
Competition	FC
Matches	1
Runs scored	5
Batting average	5.00
100s/50s	–/–
Top score	5
Balls bowled	174
Wickets	5
Bowling average	20.20
5 wickets in innings	–
10 wickets in match	–
Best bowling	4/67
Catches/stumpings	1/–
- Source: Cricinfo, 20 July 2010

Norman Roy Williams (4 January 1931 – 27 March 2024) was an English cricketer. He was a right-handed batsman who bowled fast-medium.

== Biography ==
Williams was born in March, Cambridgeshire, on 4 January 1931.

In 1949, Williams made his Minor Counties Championship debut for Cambridgeshire against Lincolnshire. From 1949 to 1951, he represented the county in 3 Minor Counties matches. Williams joined Cumberland in 1964, where he represented the county in 6 Minor Counties matches. His final appearance for Cumberland came against the Lancashire Second XI. He also played Minor Counties cricket for the Nottinghamshire Second XI.

He also played a first-class match for the Combined Services against Nottinghamshire in 1961. In his only first-class match, he scored took 5 wickets at a bowling average of 20.20, with best figures of 4/67.

Williams died in West Sussex on 27 March 2024, aged 93.
