= John Baker (cricketer) =

English cricketer (born 1933)

Personal information
- Born: 18 May 1933; Weston-super-Mare, Somerset, England
- Batting: Right-handed
- Bowling: Right-arm medium

Domestic team information
- Years: Team
- 1960–1971: Dorset
- 1955: Oxford University
- 1952–1954: Somerset

Career statistics
Competition	FC	LA
Matches	15	1
Runs scored	338	20
Batting average	18.77	20.00
100s/50s	0/1	0/0
Top score	91*	20
Balls bowled	846	36
Wickets	9	–
Bowling average	47.11	–
5 wickets in innings	0	–
10 wickets in match	0	–
Best bowling	2/26	–
Catches/stumpings	4/–	0/–
- Source: ESPNcricinfo, 22 March 2010

John Baker (born 18 May 1933) is an English former first-class cricketer. He was a right-handed batsman who bowled right-arm medium pace.

Baker made his first-class debut for Somerset in the 1952 County Championship against Lancashire. From 1952 to 1954, he represented Somerset in nine first-class matches, with his final match for the county coming against Warwickshire. In his nine matches he scored 105 runs at a batting average of 10.50, with a highest score of 26 not out.

In 1955, Baker made his first-class debut for Oxford University against Yorkshire. During 1955, he played five first-class matches for the university, with his final first-class match coming against Worcestershire. In his five matches he scored 221 runs at an average of 36.83, with a single half-century of 91 not out against Free Foresters. With the ball, he took seven wickets at a bowling average of 28.42, with best figures of 2/26.

Baker played an additional first-class match for the Combined Services in 1956 against Glamorgan.

Baker made his debut for Dorset in the 1960 Minor Counties Championship against Berkshire. He represented Dorset in 100 Minor Counties Championship matches from 1960 to 1971, his final match coming against Oxfordshire. In 1968, he played his only List-A match for Dorset against Bedfordshire in the 1968 Gillette Cup.
