= William Ashmore =

English cricketer

Personal information
- Full name: William Scott Ashmore
- Born: 29 October 1929; St John's Wood, London, England
- Died: 23 August 1992 (aged 62); Crawley, Sussex, England
- Batting: Left-handed
- Bowling: Left-arm medium-fast

Domestic team information
- Years: Team
- 1946–1947: Middlesex

Career statistics
Competition	First-class
Matches	3
Runs scored	24
Batting average	12.00
100s/50s	–/–
Top score	15*
Balls bowled	264
Wickets	3
Bowling average	43.00
5 wickets in innings	–
10 wickets in match	–
Best bowling	2/37
Catches/stumpings	1/–
- Source: Cricinfo, 30 December 2012

William Scott Ashmore (29 October 1929 – 23 August 1992) was an English first-class cricketer. Ashmore was a left-handed batsman who bowled left-arm medium-fast. He was born at St John's Wood, London.

Ashmore made two first-class appearances for Middlesex, both against Cambridge University in 1946 and 1947. He batted in three innings' for Middlesex scoring a total of 18 runs, ending each innings not out. With the ball, he took 3 wickets at an average of 38.33, with best figures of 2/37. In 1948, he made a single first-class appearance for a Combined Services team against Hampshire.

He was married to Favol May Speed, the first female Scorer at Lord's. He died at Crawley, Sussex on 23 August 1992.
