= Harry Halliday (cricketer, born 1920) =

English cricketer

Harry Halliday (9 February 1920 – 27 August 1967) was an English first-class cricketer, who played 182 games for Yorkshire County Cricket Club between 1938 and 1953. He also appeared in three games for the Combined Services, once for the Marylebone Cricket Club (MCC) and once for an 'Over 33' side in first-class cricket.

Halliday was born in Pudsey, Yorkshire, and was a useful county all-rounder, Halliday scored 8,556 runs at 31.80, with 12 centuries to his name, including three against Gloucestershire. His highest score, 144, came against Derbyshire at Queen's Park, Chesterfield in 1950. He scored 54 fifties and took 144 catches. His occasional off breaks took 107 wickets at 29.91, with a best of 6 for 79 against Derbyshire at Bramall Lane in 1952. He also claimed 5 for 73 against Kent.

He won his Yorkshire cap in 1948. Halliday scored 1,000 runs in a season four times, his best season coming in 1950 when he scored 1,484 runs at 38.05, although with only one century. After his retirement from the first-class game he served as coach to Scarborough College and Scarborough Cricket Club.

Halliday died in August 1967 in Stanley, Wakefield, Yorkshire, aged 47.
