= John Whitehead (cricketer) =

English cricketer

John Parkin Whitehead (3 September 1925 – 15 August 2000) was an English first-class cricketer, who played thirty seven first-class games for Yorkshire County Cricket Club from 1946 to 1951, plus thirty three for Worcestershire in 1953 and 1955, and four more for the Combined Services in 1947. He also played for the Yorkshire Second XI (1946–1951), Lancashire (1945), Army (1947), Yorkshire Present (1951) and the Worcestershire Second XI (1955).

Born in Uppermill, Saddleworth, Yorkshire, England, Whitehead was a right arm fast medium bowler, who took 147 wickets at 29.23, with a best of 5 for 10 for the Combined Services against Worcestershire, one of four hauls of five wickets in an innings. He scored 1,246 first-class runs at 19.16, with a highest score of 71, which he made twice, once for Worcestershire and once for the Combined Services. He took 25 catches in the field.

He had trials for Lancashire before his native county signed him. In his younger days, he bowled for Oldham C.C., and he took 35 wickets at 7 runs each for Lascelles Hall in 1948, again acting as their professional in 1949. In 1950, he was professional at Littleborough C.C.

Moving to Worcestershire, his contacts included its president, Sir George Dowty and during the winter and after retirement from professional cricket he worked for his company Dowty Aviation in Cheltenham.

Subsequently, he moved to Hampshire in the 1960s and joined Plessey Aerospace at Titchfield as a Project Manager. There he played for Yorkshire Nomads and later became Chairman of Hampshire League club Fareham.

Whitehead died in August 2000, in Southampton, Hampshire, England.
