= David Newsom (cricketer) =

English cricketer and Royal Navy officer

Personal information
- Full name: David John Newsom
- Born: 5 October 1937 (age 89); Plymouth, Devon, England
- Batting: Right-handed

Career statistics
Competition	First-class
Matches	2
Runs scored	33
Batting average	16.50
100s/50s	–/–
Top score	23
Catches/stumpings	2/–
- Source: Cricinfo, 9 March 2019

David John Newsom (born 5 October 1937) is an English former first-class cricketer and Royal Navy officer.

The son of Rear Admiral John Bertram Newsom, Newson was born at Plymouth. He was educated at Haileybury College, where he played cricket for the college cricket eleven. Newsom was an acting sub-lieutenant in the Royal Navy in May 1960, with full promotion to the rank in that same month. He was promoted to the rank of lieutenant in June 1962. He played first-class cricket for the Combined Services cricket team, making his debut against Cambridge University at Fenner's in 1960. He made a further appearance against Northamptonshire at Northampton in 1961. He scored 33 runs in these two matches, with a high score of 23.
