= Reginald Hammond =

English cricketer and Royal Navy officer

Personal information
- Full name: Reginald Joseph Leslie Hammond
- Born: 16 December 1909; Battersea, London, England
- Died: 3 January 1991 (aged 81); Chichester, Sussex, England
- Batting: Right-handed
- Role: Wicket-keeper

Career statistics
Competition	First-class
Matches	6
Runs scored	199
Batting average	18.09
100s/50s	–/–
Top score	46
Catches/stumpings	6/3
- Source: Cricinfo, 19 March 2019

Reginald Joseph Leslie Hammond OBE (16 December 1909 – 3 January 1991) was an English first-class cricketer and Royal Navy officer.

Hammond enlisted in the Royal Navy in August 1930, holding the rank of acting sub-lieutenant. He was promoted from acting sub-lieutenant to sub-lieutenant in July 1931, with seniority antedated to August 1930. In March 1932, he was promoted to the rank of lieutenant. Hammond served in the Royal Navy during the Second World War, with promotion to the rank of lieutenant commander coming two months into the conflict in November 1939. In the later stages of the war, he was promoted to the rank of commander in December 1944.

Following the war, Hammond made his debut in first-class cricket for the Combined Services cricket team against Glamorgan at Pontypridd in 1948. He played first-class cricket for the Combined Services until 1951, making a total of six appearances. Playing as a wicket-keeper, Hammond scored 199 runs at an average of 18.09, with a high score of 46. Behind the stumps he took six catches and made three stumpings.

Hammond was made an OBE in the 1957 New Year Honours and retired from the navy in December 1959. He died at Chichester in January 1991.
