= Michael Osborne (cricketer) =

English cricketer (1932–2016)

Personal information
- Full name: Michael John Osborne
- Born: 9 April 1932; Southend-on-Sea, Essex, England
- Died: 16 March 2016 (aged 83); Torquay, Devon, England
- Batting: Right-handed
- Bowling: Right-arm off break

Domestic team information
- Years: Team
- 1968: Devon

Career statistics
Competition	First-class
Matches	3
Runs scored	155
Batting average	25.83
100s/50s	–/1
Top score	60
Balls bowled	168
Wickets	2
Bowling average	40.50
5 wickets in innings	–
10 wickets in match	–
Best bowling	2/65
Catches/stumpings	3/–
- Source: Cricinfo, 9 March 2019

Michael John Osborne (9 April 1932 – 16 March 2016) was an English first-class cricketer and Royal Air Force airman.

== Biography ==
While serving in the Royal Air Force, Osborne played first-class cricket for the Combined Services cricket team. He made his debut in 1961 against the touring South Africa Fezelas at Portsmouth. He made two further appearances in 1962, against Cambridge University at Fenner's, and Ireland at Belfast. In the match against Cambridge University, he recorded what would his only first-class half century by making 60 runs in the Combined Services first-innings. He scored 155 runs in his three matches, averaging 25.83. He also took two wickets with his off break bowling. Osborne later played minor counties cricket for Devon in 1968, making two appearances in the Minor Counties Championship.

Osborne died in Torquay, Devon, on 16 March 2016, at the age of 83.
