= Rex Yeatman =

Personal information
- Full name: Rex Herbert Yeatman
- Born: 4 October 1919; Richmond, Surrey, England
- Died: 5 January 1995 (aged 75); Chichester, Sussex, England
- Batting: Right-handed
- Bowling: Right-arm medium

Domestic team information
- Years: Team
- 1946: Combined Services
- 1946–1947: Surrey
- FC debut: 29 June 1946 Combined Services v Northamptonshire
- Last FC: 14 June 1947 Surrey v Cambridge University

Career statistics
Competition	First-class
Matches	6
Runs scored	53
Batting average	6.62
100s/50s	0/0
Top score	21
Balls bowled	42
Wickets	0
Bowling average	–
5 wickets in innings	–
10 wickets in match	–
Best bowling	–
Catches/stumpings	1/–
- Source: CricketArchive, 17 October 2009

Rex Herbert Yeatman (4 October 1919 – 5 January 1995) was an English cricketer who had a brief first class cricket career for the Surrey First XI between 1946 and 1947, amid a long career for the Surrey Second XI between 1939 and 1952. A right-handed batsman and right-arm medium bowler, Yeatman made only 53 first class runs at 6.62 with a best of 21 from his six-match career, and bowled 42 wicket-less deliveries. He also served in the British Army during the Second World War, and played for their services cricket team in 1946.

== Career ==
Born in Kew, near Richmond, Surrey, Yeatman played two matches for the Surrey Second XI against Kent and Gloucestershire Second XIs on 27 May and 9 June 1939. Following service in the Army, Yeatman appeared in his first two first class matches in 1946 – against Northamptonshire while playing for the Combined Services on 29 June, followed by a match against the Combined Services while playing for Surrey on 17 July. He made a duck on debut and did not bowl. He made 19 against Somerset on 17 August, followed by four against Hampshire, his career-best 21 against Combined Services on 4 September, and finally a duck and four not out in his final match against Cambridge University on 14 June 1947. He made five subsequent Second XI appearances through to June 1952, whereupon his career ended. He died in Chichester, Sussex, in 1995.
