= David Gay (British Army officer) =

British Army officer, cricketer and educator

David William Maurice Gay MC
- Born: 2 April 1920; Kensington, London, England
- Died: 10 July 2010 (aged 90); Hamilton, Waikato, New Zealand
- Military career
- Allegiance: United Kingdom
- Branch: Merchant Navy; British Army
- Service years: 1938–1958
- Rank: Major
- Service number: 220676
- Units: Royal Sussex Regiment; 2nd Dragoon Guards (Queen's Bays)
- Conflicts: World War II; *Battle of France; *Dunkirk evacuation *First Battle of El Alamein; *Second Battle of El Alamein; *Tunisian campaign *Battle of San Marino
- Other work: Cricketer, educator

Major David William Maurice Gay MC (2 April 1920 – 10 July 2010) was a decorated British Army officer, English cricketer, and later an educator. Gay served with distinction in World War II, earning the Military Cross during the course of the war. Following the war, he played first-class cricket, before embarking on a career as a teacher, which eventually led him to New Zealand, where he lived out the remainder of his life.

== Early life and war service ==
Born in Kensington, London on 2 April 1920, he was the son of Stuart Eddington Gay of Rye, Sussex, and Margaret Muriel Kennedy. He was educated at Shrewsbury School, where he excelled at sports, including cricket, which he played for the school.

After leaving Shrewsbury School, Gay joined the Merchant Navy as an ordinary seaman in December 1938. Two months after joining, the ship he was on caught fire near the Pitcairn Islands and took three days to be extinguished. Gay fought in World War II, fighting in France with the Royal Sussex Regiment as part of the British Expeditionary Force. Following the unsuccessful defence of France, he was evacuated from Dunkirk. Following the Dunkirk Evacuation, he was commissioned as an emergency commission to the 2nd Dragoon Guards (Queen's Bays). In January 1942, he was promoted from Cadet to 2nd Lieutenant. He served with the Queen's Bays in the North African Campaign, and took command of Troop B Squadron in August 1942. He fought in all the major battles of the campaign, from both Battles of El Alamein, in which he was wounded, to the campaigns end in Tunisia. During the Tunisia campaign, he was said to have shot down a Bf 109 with his Browning Rifle, after which it exploded and crashed among the Welsh Guards, setting alight to some of their trucks.

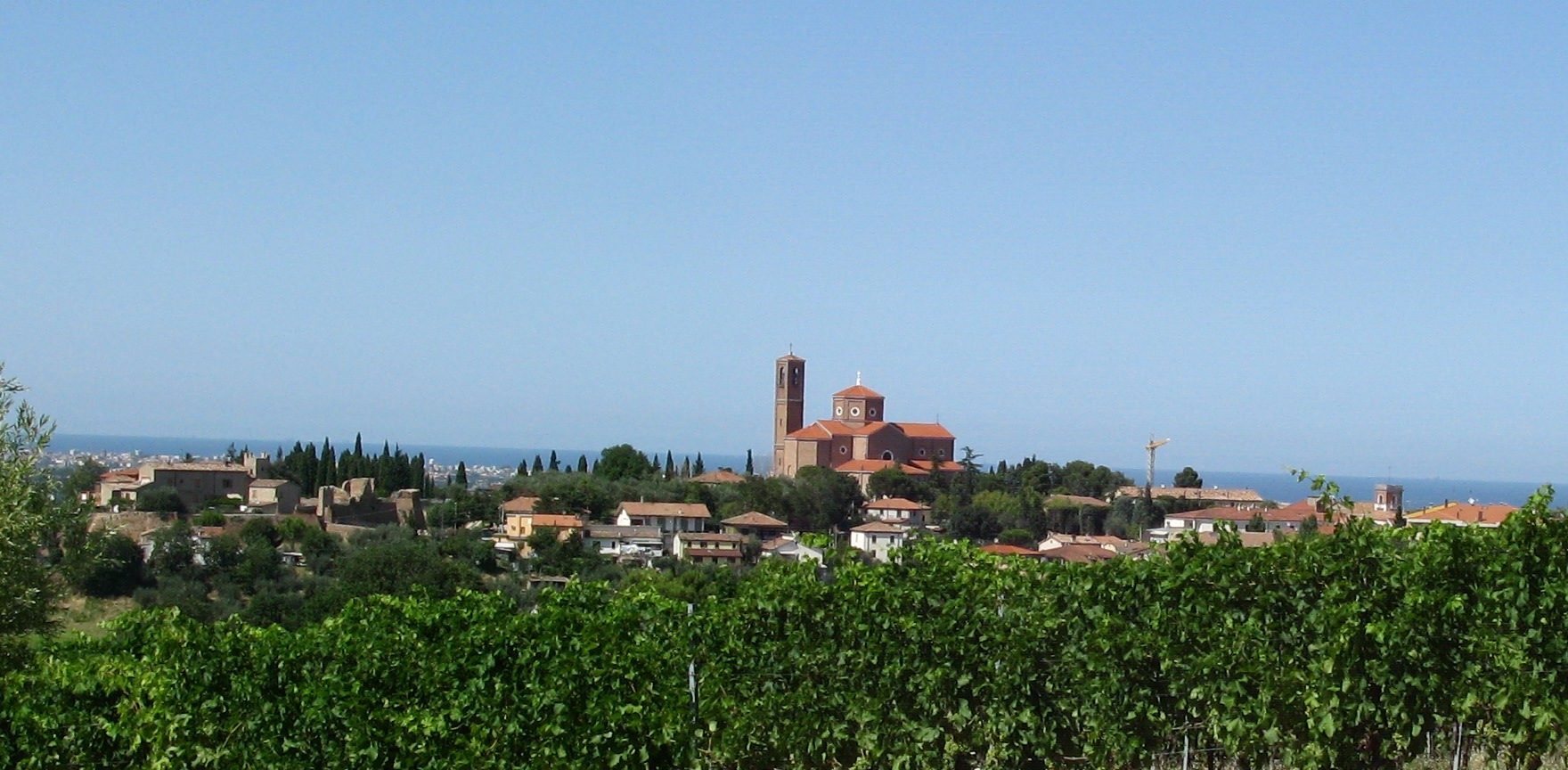
Gay carried out the actions which led to his awarding of the Military Cross near the town of Coriano (pictured).

He saw action later in the war during the Italian Campaign, including action at Coriano Ridge, during which on 20 September 1944 he carried out the actions which earned him his Military Cross. Commanding a troop of tanks in an attack on the ridge, an important target in the push toward Rimini, they came under heave machine-gun and anti-tank fire, holding their advance up and causing heavy casualties. The Queen's Bays lost two tanks, causing the accompanying King's Royal Rifle Corps to take cover in nearby buildings, which instantly came under heavy fire. Providing covering fire and ordering his remaining tanks to cover the evacuation of the wounded. Gay then dismounted his own tank, ran across ground which was under heavy sniper and artillery fire, running to one of the two tanks which had been crippled and from which none of their crews had emerged from. Entering one of the tanks, he found all but one crew member dead, with the one surviving member, its commander, seriously wounded. Removing the wounded crew member from the tank, while being shot at from close range, Gay successful managed to take the officer to safety; despite this, the officer was hit twice while being carried to safety, and died from his wounds shortly thereafter. Gay's driver, who had witnessed the rescue, described it as the "bravest thing" he had ever seen. His receipt of the Military Cross was mentioned in dispatches in the London Gazette in February 1945.

He continued the war in Italy, on one occasion he was carrying out a night-time reconnaissance on foot with the Gurkhas to establish a point for crossing the River Marano. During this mission, he was mistaken for a German soldier by one of the Gurkhas, who silently crept up behind him with his kukri poised to strike Gay. The Gurkha placed his hands on Gay's shoulders, felt his pips he was wearing and realised his mistake before he could strike. Gay calculated that throughout the course of the war he had seventeen near misses. In February 1945, he obtained the rank of lieutenant on a permanent basis, having held the position temporarily since February 1943.

== Post-war ==
David Gay
Cricket information
- Batting: Right-handed
- Bowling: Right-arm medium

Domestic team information
- Years: Team
- 1949: Sussex

Career statistics
Competition	First-class
Matches	4
Runs scored	16
Batting average	3.20
100s/50s	–/–
Top score	11
Balls bowled	552
Wickets	9
Bowling average	32.00
5 wickets in innings	–
10 wickets in match	–
Best bowling	4/57
Catches/stumpings	1/–
- Source: Cricinfo, 11 March 2012

Following the end of the war, Gay continued in military service with the Queen's Bays. In 1947, he was promoted to the rank of Captain. Having been a talented sportsman before the war, Gay featured in first-class cricket, being selected in 1949 to play for the Combined Services against the touring New Zealanders at the Garrison Ground 2. Gay was dismissed for a duck in the Combined Services first-innings by Ces Burke, while in the New Zealanders first-innings he bowled 31 overs of his right-arm medium pace, though without taking a wicket. He made a second first-class appearance for the Combined Services in the same season against Hampshire at the United Services Recreation Ground, Portsmouth. He again made a duck in the Combined Services first-innings, falling to the bowling of Clifford Walker. He claimed two wickets in Hampshire's first-innings, those of David Blake and Reginald Dare, finishing the innings with figures of 2/61 from 23 overs, while in their second-innings he took figures of 4/57 from 15 overs. In that same season, he played two first-class matches for Sussex in the County Championship against Glamorgan at The Saffrons, Eastbourne, and Surrey at the County Ground, Hove. This was his only season of first-class cricket, though he did feature for the Free Foresters in non-first-class matches in 1951 and 1952.

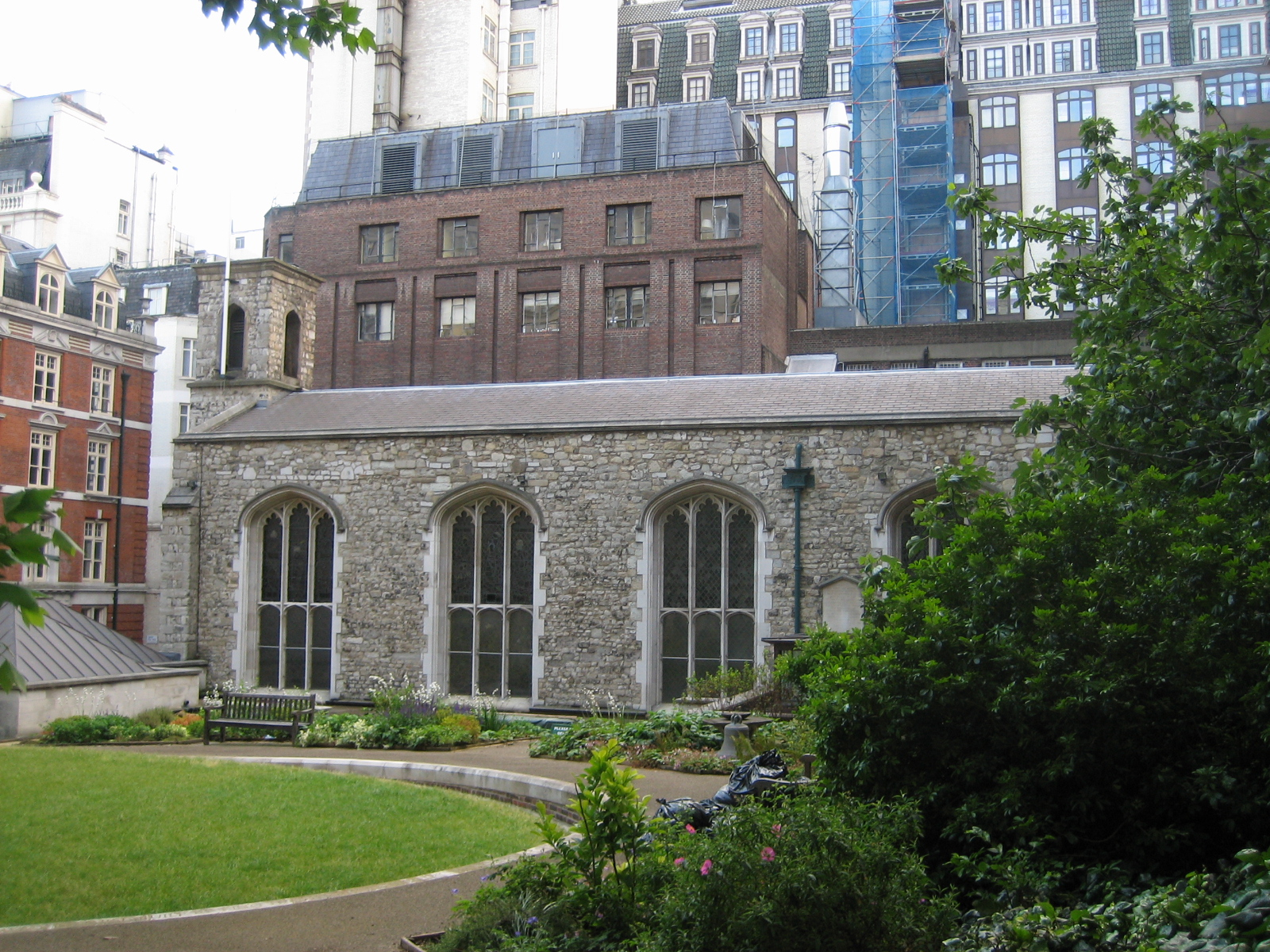
Gay married Yolande Innes at the Savoy Chapel (pictured) on 3 October 1951.

On 3 October 1951, he married New Zealand born Yolande Innes QSO, at Savoy Chapel, London. He continued to serve in the army until 1958, when he retired and upon doing so was granted the honorary rank of Major. Following retirement from the army, he embarked on a career in teaching. He taught at Chafyn Grove School in Salisbury, Wiltshire, for seven years. He then moved to New Zealand, where he taught for 24 years at the Southwell Preparatory School in Hamilton. Gay and Innes had two children, Susan, born 1953, and Richard, born 1954. Gay survived Innes, who died on 30 March 1998 at Cambridge, Waikato. Gay died at Hamilton, Waikato, on 10 July 2010. His obituary featured in The Daily Telegraph on 2 August 2010.
