= Anthony Thackara =

English cricketer and Royal Navy officer

Personal information
- Full name: Anthony Leonard Samuel Salter Thackara
- Born: 14 March 1917; Portsmouth, Hampshire, England
- Died: 25 November 2007 (aged 90); Billingshurst, Sussex, England
- Batting: Right-handed

Domestic team information
- Years: Team
- 1950–1952: Cornwall

Career statistics
Competition	First-class
Matches	4
Runs scored	112
Batting average	18.66
100s/50s	0/0
Top score	42
Catches/stumpings	3/–
- Source: Cricinfo, 7 March 2019

Anthony Leonard Samuel Salter Thackara (14 March 1917 – 25 November 2007) was an English first-class cricketer and Royal Navy officer. Thackara served in the Royal Navy for approximately twenty years from 1938 to 1959, during which time he served in the Second World War and played first-class cricket for the Combined Services cricket team.

== Life and career ==
Thackara was born at Portsmouth. He enlisted in the Royal Navy prior to January 1938, when he gained the rank of sub-lieutenant in January 1938. Thackara served in the Second World War, with promotion to lieutenant coming three months into the conflict. A year later he was mentioned in dispatches in December 1940. Thackara had served aboard HMS Neptune during 1940, a year before it sank after striking a mine off the coast of Tripoli in December 1941. Following the war, he was promoted to the rank of lieutenant commander in June 1947.

He made his debut in first-class cricket in 1949 for the Combined Services cricket team against Worcestershire at Worcester. In July 1950, he was promoted to the rank of commander. He played a second first-class match for the Combined Services in 1950 against Worcestershire, as well as appearing in minor counties cricket for Cornwall while posted at HMNB Devonport, making eleven appearances in the Minor Counties Championship between 1950 and 1952. He made two final appearances in first-class cricket in 1955, playing once for the Combined Services against Warwickshire at Edgbaston, and for Douglas Jardine's invitational XI against Oxford University at Eastbourne. His four first-class matches yielded 112 runs, with a high score of 42.

In 1958, he was the Training Commander at RNAS Bramcote. Thackary retired from active service in April 1959, retaining the rank of commander. He died at Billingshurst in November 2007.
