= Derek Pearson =

English cricketer (born 1937)

Personal information
- Full name: Derek Brooke Pearson
- Born: 29 March 1937 (age 89); Kingswinford, England
- Batting: Right-handed
- Bowling: Right-arm fast-medium

Domestic team information
- Years: Team
- 1954–1961: Worcestershire

Career statistics
Competition	FC
Matches	76
Runs scored	734
Batting average	8.53
100s/50s	0/0
Top score	49
Balls bowled	12,150
Wickets	210
Bowling average	26.38
5 wickets in innings	9
10 wickets in match	1
Best bowling	6–70
Catches/stumpings	35/0
- Source: CricketArchive, 12 November 2008

Derek Brooke Pearson (born 29 March 1937) is an English former first-class cricketer who played from the mid-1950s until the early 1960s, taking over 200 wickets. He played all but two of his games for Worcestershire, who capped him in 1959; the others were for Combined Services.

== Career ==
Pearson's career was at times controversial. He was called for throwing in his second match in 1954, and in the opening match of the 1959 Indian tour, he was no-balled five times by umpire Syd Buller on the first day. He was no-balled again once in a County Championship match three weeks later, and then twice more in a match in 1960.

Pearson made his first-class debut for Worcestershire at Worcester against Cambridge University in June 1954, taking four wickets; his first victim was Colin Smith. He played one more first-class match that summer, but none at all in 1955 and just two in each of 1956 and 1957. In that last year, both appearances were for Combined Services: Pearson was in the Royal Air Force, for whose team he had appeared in a minor match against his county in 1956.

Pearson's first-class career really began in 1958: that season he played 24 times for Worcestershire and collected 62 wickets at 22.22, twice managing five wickets in an innings. He was capped the following season, and repaid his county with his best season's aggregate: 79 wickets, taken at 25.69 apiece. That year too he achieved his career-best bowling performance, claiming 6–70 against Leicestershire, picking up three more five-wicket hauls in the course of the season.

Pearson began 1960 as a first-team regular, and early in the year produced his best match figures, 11–145 against Glamorgan; he also took nine wickets in the game against Oxford University. He held his place until mid-season, but some disappointing figures then saw him drop into the Second XI, whence he did not re-emerge until August. He then played three County Championship games for a total return of just two wickets, and was out of the side again by the end of the season, ending with only 45 wickets for the summer.

Except for an early (and wicketless) outing against the Australians, Pearson was confined to the Second XI for the first half of 1961. However, he took plenty of wickets for the seconds, and was restored to the first team in mid-August, playing Worcestershire's last five matches of the season. Sadly for him, his promotion was not successful: despite four wickets in his first game back, against Nottinghamshire, he took only four more wickets in total. His career came to a quiet end against Sussex at Hove in early September, a game in which Pearson bowled just four overs.

After he retired from cricket he worked in the probation service, where "he became a national expert in divorce court liaison work".
