= Basil Hayles =

English cricketer and British Army officer

Personal information
- Full name: Norman Louis Haggett
- Born: 8 July 1916; Andover, Hampshire, England
- Died: 4 November 2007 (aged 91); Aldeburgh, Suffolk, England
- Batting: Right-handed
- Role: Wicket-keeper

Career statistics
Competition	First-class
Matches	7
Runs scored	69
Batting average	7.66
100s/50s	–/–
Top score	40
Catches/stumpings	6/2
- Source: Cricinfo, 20 February 2019

Basil Ratcliffe Marshall Hayles (29 October 1916 – 4 November 2007) was an English first-class cricketer and British Army officer.

Hayles was born at Andover, Hampshire. He was educated at Haileybury and Imperial Service College, before attending the Royal Military Academy. He graduated from the academy in August 1936 and was posted to the Royal Corps of Signals as a second lieutenant, with promotion to lieutenant coming in August 1939. In the year prior to his promotion to lieutenant, Hayles played two first-class cricket matches as a wicket-keeper for the British Army cricket team against Cambridge University at Fenner's, and Oxford University at Camberley. He played a further first-class match for the Army in 1939 against Cambridge University.

He served during the Second World War, during which he was promoted to the rank of captain in August 1944. Following the war, Hayles played first-class cricket for the Combined Services cricket team, making two appearances in 1947 against the touring South Africans at Portsmouth, and Oxford University at Oxford. He also played minor counties cricket for Norfolk in the same year. He followed these up with two further first-class appearances in 1949 against Hampshire at Aldershot, and Kent at Gillingham. Across seven first-class appearances, Hayles scored 69 runs with a high score of 40. He was promoted to the rank of major following the war in August 1949. He was promoted to the rank of lieutenant colonel in January 1957. He was made a colonel in February 1964, with seniority to June 1963.

Hayles retired from military service in October 1971. He died 36 years later in November 2007 at Aldeburgh, Suffolk.
