= John Sayer (cricketer) =

English cricketer and military officer (1920–2013)

Personal information
- Full name: John Druce Sayer
- Born: 29 October 1920; Hong Kong
- Died: 27 October 2013 (aged 92); Easterton, Wiltshire, England
- Height: 6 ft 5 in (1.96 m)
- Batting: Unknown
- Bowling: Slow left-arm orthodox

Career statistics
Competition	First-class
Matches	4
Runs scored	81
Batting average	11.57
100s/50s	–/–
Top score	49
Balls bowled	419
Wickets	7
Bowling average	39.14
5 wickets in innings	–
10 wickets in match	–
Best bowling	4/38
Catches/stumpings	3/–
- Source: Cricinfo, 15 March 2019

John Druce Sayer (29 October 1920 – 27 October 2013) OBE was an English first-class cricketer and an officer in both the Fleet Air Arm and the Royal Navy. Serving in the Fleet Air Arm during the Second World War, Sayer took part in mining operations against German-occupied channel ports, as well flying anti-U-boat missions during the Battle of the Atlantic. Following an injury sustained during an accident, Sayer transferred to the naval branch in 1947. He continued to serve in the Royal Navy until 1970, undertaking various duties during that time. He also played first-class cricket for the Combined Services cricket team.

== Early life and WWII ==
Sayer was born at Hong Kong. He was educated at Shrewsbury School, before enlisting in the Royal Navy as part of the Fleet Air Arm. He served during the Second World War in 811 Squadron, flying Fairey Swordfish in mining and torpedo operations against German occupied ports in Belgium, France and the Netherlands. He was based firstly at RNAS Lee-on-Solent, before moving to RAF Thorney Island. He later served aboard HMS Biter in November 1942, from which he flew anti-U-boat missions during the Battle of the Atlantic, with Sayer piloting Vought Chesapeake dive bombers in 1943. Later in 1943, he undertook duties as an air gunnery officer, which lasted until 1945. Shortly after the war, he served aboard in the Mediterranean aboard the light aircraft carrier HMS Triumph, flying the Fairey Firefly.

== Naval branch and later life ==
Sayer transferred to the naval branch in 1947, after being injured bailing out of a Seafire. He was promoted to the rank of lieutenant in July 1947, with seniority antedated to June 1942. He served aboard an anti-submarine frigate in 1948, before being appointed as an instructor with the Royal Marines in 1950. In that same year he was promoted to the rank of lieutenant commander in June 1950. He made his debut in first-class cricket for the Combined Services cricket team in 1950, against Worcestershire at Worcester. He played first-class cricket for the Combined Services until 1952, making four appearances. Across his four first-class matches, he scored a total of 81 runs at an average of 11.57, with a high score of 49. With his slow left-arm orthodox bowling, Sayers took 7 wickets at 39.14 runs apiece, with best figures of 4 for 38.

In 1953, he served aboard HMS Oakham Castle and the newly refitted HMS Meon. In that same year he took part in amphibious exercises in Mediterranean, under the direction of Lord Mountbatten. He was promoted to the rank of commander in December 1957. He was based at Singapore in 1962, where he played cricket against players from the Australia cricket team. Sayers was appointed to the personnel department in 1962, commanding a barracks in Singapore between 1962–67. He was appointed as a naval attaché to Thailand from 1967–70, where he advised the Royal Thai Navy and oversaw their purchase of a Royal Navy frigate. During this period he was also appointed to the RAF Staff College, Bracknell. He was made an OBE in the 1970 Birthday Honours, retiring from the navy in October of that year.

Following retirement, he became a senior schools liaison officer for the navy, a position he retired from in 1980. He retired to Easterton in Wiltshire, where he coached cricket at the nearby Dauntsey's School and played club cricket for Wiltshire Queries Cricket Club, later serving as the club's vice-president. He died at Easterton in October 2013.
