= David Heath (cricket administrator) =

English cricketer and cricket administrator

David Michael William Heath (14 December 1931, in Hall Green, Birmingham – 13 June 1994, in Solihull) was an English first-class cricketer and cricket administrator.

David Heath was educated at Moseley Grammar School, where he captained the cricket and rugby union teams. At 16, he scored a century for Warwickshire Amateurs versus Staffordshire. A year later, he made his first-class county debut for Warwickshire. During his RAF service, he represented the Combined Services and scored his only first-class century, 149 against Worcestershire at New Road in 1951. He scored 580 runs as a right-handed batsman in 19 matches before embarking on a successful business career.

He captained Moseley to seven Birmingham League titles and later became President of the League. Further administrative appointments followed before he succeeded A. C. Smith as Secretary/Chief Executive of Warwickshire County Cricket Club in 1986. He was forced to retire on health grounds shortly before his death from kidney failure in 1994, aged 62.
