= Bernard Elgood =

English cricketer and British Army officer

Personal information
- Full name: Bernard Cyril Elgood
- Born: 10 March 1922; Hampstead, Middlesex, England
- Died: 10 July 1997 (aged 75); Pauntley Place, Gloucestershire, England
- Nickname: Bruno
- Batting: Right-handed

Domestic team information
- Years: Team
- 1948: Cambridge University
- 1949: Berkshire

Career statistics
Competition	First-class
Matches	14
Runs scored	631
Batting average	33.21
100s/50s	2/2
Top score	127*
Catches/stumpings	5/–
- Source: Cricinfo, 13 February 2019

Bernard Cyril "Bruno" Elgood MBE (10 March 1922 – 10 July 1997) was an English first-class cricketer and British Army officer.

Elgood was born at Hampstead and educated at Bradfield College. The completion of his studies at Bradfield coincided with the Second World War, with Elgood enlisting in the British Army with the Royal Engineers as a second lieutenant in November 1941. He was promoted to the rank of lieutenant in January 1945, antedated to September 1944.

Following the war he attended Pembroke College, Cambridge. He debuted in first-class cricket for Cambridge University against Lancashire at Cambridge in 1948, a season in which he made all twelve of his first-class appearances for Cambridge in. He scored 531 runs across these twelve matches, averaging 35.40. He scored two centuries against Sussex and Middlesex, with his highest score of 127 not out coming against the former. Still serving in the army following the war, Elgood also played two first-class matches in 1948 for the Combined Services cricket team. In 1949, he played minor counties cricket for Berkshire, making five appearances in the Minor Counties Championship.

Elgood was promoted to the rank of captain in March 1949, with promotion to major in March 1956. He was made a member of the Order of the British Empire in the 1959 New Year Honours. He was made a lieutenant colonel in January 1965. Three years later he was made a colonel in June 1968. He was promoted to the rank of brigadier in January 1971. Elgood retired from military service in March 1976. He died at Pauntley Place in Gloucestershire in July 1997.
