= Louis Devereux =

English cricketer (1931–2016)

Personal information
- Full name: Louis Norman Devereux
- Born: 20 October 1931; Heavitree, Exeter, Devon, England
- Died: 12 November 2016 (aged 85); Aberystwyth, Dyfed, Wales
- Batting: Right-handed
- Bowling: Right-arm off-break

Domestic team information
- Years: Team
- 1949: Middlesex
- 1950–1955: Worcestershire
- 1956–1960: Glamorgan

Career statistics
Competition	FC
Matches	192
Runs scored	5,560
Batting average	19.85
100s/50s	1/23
Top score	108*
Balls bowled	13,463
Wickets	178
Bowling average	35.31
5 wickets in innings	2
10 wickets in match	0
Best bowling	7/29
Catches/stumpings	107/0
- Source: CricketArchive, 22 November 2008

Louis Norman Devereux (20 October 1931 – 12 November 2016) was an English cricketer who played first-class cricket between 1949 and 1960. He played his county cricket for Middlesex, Worcestershire and Glamorgan, and also appeared for Combined Services. He was capped by Glamorgan in 1956.

== Life and career ==
=== Middlesex ===
Devereux was educated at Torquay Boys' Grammar School. He made his first-class debut at the age of 17, appearing for Middlesex against Cambridge University at Fenner's in May 1949, though he neither batted nor bowled. The following month, he played against Oxford University at The University Parks, scoring 32 and 11. These proved to be his only appearances for Middlesex, and in 1950 and 1951 he played occasionally for Combined Services and Worcestershire, on one occasion in June 1951 turning out for the former against the latter. Playing for Combined Services against Glamorgan in late May 1951 he hit his maiden first-class half-century in scoring a first-innings 52.

=== Worcestershire ===
From 1952 onwards Devereux played County Championship cricket for Worcestershire, and the 1953 season saw him send down over 4,000 deliveries, by far the most he bowled in any one season, and take 55 first-class wickets. This was the only time he topped 50, albeit at an average of over 40 and without his ever claiming more than three dismissals in a single innings. 1953 was also a productive summer with the bat for Devereux: he finished it with 732 runs at a little under 21, including four half-centuries. The highest of these, 81 not out against Warwickshire at the beginning of July, remained his highest score for Worcestershire.

=== Glamorgan ===
He played only the first half of the 1955 season, and in 1956 joined Glamorgan, being awarded his cap in his first year. Although he only took 22 wickets in total, those included the two best innings returns of his career. The first and better of the two came against Yorkshire at Middlesbrough in late July, when he took 6/29 in 17.2 first-innings overs. Less than a fortnight later, he claimed 5/11 in 11.3 overs, working in tandem with Don Shepherd (5/25 in 18 overs) as Gloucestershire, who had been 61/0, lost all ten wickets for 20 runs. That summer Devereux also made 93 against Northamptonshire.

He had made 833 first-class runs in 1956, but he surpassed that in 1957 when he managed 1,039, the only occasion on which he reached a thousand. At the end of May he made what was to remain his only first-class century (although by the end of his career he had reached 50 on no fewer than 23 other occasions), making 108* against Lancashire. He also hit four more half-centuries during the 1957 season.

Although Devereux's position seemed strong, he was never again to enjoy such a successful season. He did manage just over 700 runs in 1958, but then his form began to desert him, and while he kept his first-team spot until the middle of 1959, by the end of that summer he was struggling for his place. He played some minor cricket in Argentina in 1959–60, but when the English summer came around again Devereux found himself out of favour with his county.

He played only five first-class matches in 1960, and after the game against Gloucestershire in early July he was out of the first team for good. He was released by Glamorgan, only discovering his fate when he saw it printed in the local newspaper.

Devereux was a fine player of table tennis, and played for England in 1949. After his cricket career he ran the Central Hotel in Aberystwyth from 1965 until 1995.
