= Ronald Stevenson (cricketer) =

Scottish cricketer

Personal information
- Full name: Ronald Leckie Stevenson
- Born: 26 November 1938; Ayr, Ayrshire, Scotland
- Died: 3 September 1999 (aged 60); Little Paxton, Cambridgeshire, England
- Batting: Right-handed
- Bowling: Right-arm off break

Domestic team information
- Years: Team
- 1959–1962: Bedfordshire

Career statistics
Competition	First-class
Matches	2
Runs scored	33
Batting average	11.00
100s/50s	–/–
Top score	17*
Balls bowled	456
Wickets	3
Bowling average	76.66
5 wickets in innings	–
10 wickets in match	–
Best bowling	3/86
Catches/stumpings	1/–
- Source: Cricinfo, 15 March 2019

Ronald Leckie Stevenson (26 November 1938 – 3 September 1999) was a Scottish first-class cricketer.

While serving in the British Army, Stevenson played first-class cricket for the Combined Services cricket team, making two appearances in 1962, against Cambridge University at Fenner's and Ireland at Belfast. He took three first-class wickets with his right-arm off break, with all three wickets coming in the match against Cambridge University. He had previously played minor counties cricket for Bedfordshire, debuting in the 1959 Minor Counties Championship against Lincolnshire. He played just four minor counties matches for Bedfordshire, playing two matches in 1959 and two matches in 1962.

He died in November 1999 at Little Paxton, Cambridgeshire.
