= Alfred McGaw =

English cricketer and British Army officer

Personal information
- Full name: Alfred Joseph Thoburn McGaw
- Born: 1 April 1900; Haslemere, Surrey, England
- Died: 8 February 1984 (aged 83); Saint Helier, Jersey
- Batting: Right-handed
- Bowling: Leg spin

Domestic team information
- Years: Team
- 1928: Sussex

Career statistics
Competition	First-class
Matches	7
Runs scored	170
Batting average	17.00
100s/50s	–/1
Top score	52
Balls bowled	724
Wickets	8
Bowling average	34.25
5 wickets in innings	–
10 wickets in match	–
Best bowling	4/17
Catches/stumpings	3/–
- Source: Cricinfo, 26 February 2012

Lt.-Col. Alfred Joseph Thoburn McGaw (1 April 1900 – 8 February 1984) was an English cricketer and British Army officer. McGaw was a right-handed batsman who bowled leg spin. The son of John McGaw and Pauline Tate, he was born at Haslemere, Surrey, and was educated at Charterhouse School.

McGaw made his first-class debut in cricket for Sussex against Cambridge University at Fenner's in 1928. He made a second first-class appearance in that season for Sussex, in the return fixture between the teams at the County Ground, Hove. In June 1930, while serving in the British Raj, McGaw made a further first-class appearance for a Punjab Governor's XI against the Muslims. The following year, back in England, McGaw made two first-class appearances for the Army against Oxford University and the Royal Air Force. In that same season he also made a single first-class appearance for the Combined Services against the touring New Zealanders, which saw McGaw make his only first-class half century, with a score of 52. He made a final first-class appearance for the Army in 1932, against the touring South Americans. In his total of seven first-class matches, he scored 170 runs at an average of 17.00, while with the ball he took 8 wickets at a bowling average of 34.25, with best figures of 4/17.

He was married to Sylvia Inez Pakenham Johnstone, with the couple having one daughter, Anne, though Anne died in a car crash in 1974. He then later married a German, named Lisalotta Steiner. They conceived a son, John Joseph McGaw. McGaw lived out his final days at Saint Helier in Jersey, dying in hospital there on 8 February 1984.
