= Percy Davis (Kent cricketer) =

English cricketer and aviator (1922–2018)

Personal information
- Full name: Percy Vere Davis
- Born: 4 April 1922; Forest Hill, London
- Died: 28 November 2018 (aged 96); High Bickington, Devon
- Batting: Right-handed

Domestic team information
- Years: Team
- 1946: Kent
- First-class debut: 25 May 1946 Kent v Derbyshire
- Last First-class: 7 August 1946 Kent v Somerset

Career statistics
Competition	First-class
Matches	10
Runs scored	276
Batting average	16.23
100s/50s	1/0
Top score	136
Catches/stumpings	4/–
- Source: CricInfo, 19 May 2017

Percy Vere Davis (4 April 1922 – 28 November 2018), known in later life as Philip Davis, was an English aviator and cricketer. He was born in Forest Hill in Lewisham, south-east London in 1922.

Davis joined the staff at Kent County Cricket Club in 1938, having been successful in a trial the previous year. He made his Second XI debut against Surrey Second XI before playing the whole of the 1939 season, mainly as an opening batsman. He scored 512 runs during 1939, a total only beaten by Godfrey Evans who went on to play 91 times for England.

During World War II Davis served in the Royal Air Force (RAF), reaching the rank of Flight Lieutenant. He served mainly in the Middle East and in Italy. After VE Day he played as part of a Desert Air Force cricket team in a series of matches in England, scoring a century against a team from RAF Bomber Command at Trent Bridge.

Davis opted to remain in the RAF after the war, but returned to Kent whilst on leave in 1946, making his first-class cricket debut for the team in May 1946 in a County Championship match against Derbyshire at Queen's Park, Chesterfield. He played a total of ten first-class matches during the 1946 season, six for Kent and four for Combined Services. Davis was a right-handed batsman whom Kent were willing to re-engage as a professional if he had opted to do so. He scored a total of 276 first-class runs including one century, scoring 136 for Combined Services against Oxford University.

Davis' last first-class match was for Kent against Somerset in August 1946 at the St Lawrence Ground in Canterbury. He also made two appearances for Kent's Second XI during the 1946 season.

After remaining in the RAF until 1955, Davis worked in the civil aviation industry, primarily for British Caledonian. As well as cricket he played golf. He died at High Bickington in Devon in November 2018 aged 96.
