= Eric Hewitt =

English cricketer

Eric Joseph Hewitt (19 December 1935 – 2008) was an English first-class cricketer who played in one match for Warwickshire in 1954 and in another single game for the Combined Services in 1957. He was born in Erdington, Birmingham; the exact date and the place of his death are not known.

A right-handed lower order batsman and a right-arm leg-break and googly bowler, Hewitt scored 40 in his only Warwickshire innings and also took his only first-class wicket in his solitary game for the county, against Oxford University in 1954. For the Combined Services against Warwickshire in 1957, he batted in the middle order but did not bowl. He played fairly regularly for Warwickshire's second eleven in the 1958 Minor Counties Championship, but was only intermittently successful as a bowler and not at all as a batsman.
