= Geoffrey Hill (cricketer, born 1934) =

English cricketer

Geoffrey Harry Hill (17 September 1934 – 13 March 2012) was an English first-class cricketer who played in 41 matches for Warwickshire between 1958 and 1960 and in one match for the Combined Services in 1957. He was born at Hayley Green, Halesowen, Worcestershire and died in Preston, Lancashire.

Hill was a tail-end left-handed batsman and a left-arm orthodox spin bowler. He played for the Combined Services against Warwickshire in 1957, having already played for Warwickshire's second eleven in Minor Counties matches since 1954. Hill came into the Warwickshire first team in the middle of the wet 1958 season and appeared in his first season to be at least part of the answer to the spin bowling gap in the county's line-up that had been left by the retirement of Eric Hollies at the end of the 1957 season. In 19 matches he took 59 wickets at an average of 20.59 runs per wicket. His best bowling came at the traditionally spin-friendly College Ground, Cheltenham, where he took eight Gloucestershire wickets for 70 runs in the only full innings of a rain-spoiled game. In the final match of the 1958 season, he took six Middlesex first-innings wickets for 43 runs, but was not bowled at all in the second innings.

Hill was unable to maintain this early success. He was in the Warwickshire side for many of the early matches of the 1959 season, but wickets were fewer in number and also more expensive, and the off-spin of Basil Bridge was increasingly preferred as the spin option as the season wore on. His 30 wickets in 1959 cost 41.20 runs apiece, and there was no greater success in 1960 even though Bridge was out of form; at the end of the 1960 season, Hill left first-class cricket. Throughout his three years in first-class cricket, his batting was negligible, and he reached 20 in an innings only twice, with a top score of 23.
