= Michael Dunning (cricketer) =

English cricketer & army officer (1941–2020)

Personal information
- Full name: Michael Lindsay Dunning
- Born: 11 March 1941; Windsor, Berkshire, England
- Died: 13 August 2020 (aged 79)
- Batting: Right-handed
- Bowling: Leg break

Domestic team information
- Years: Team
- 1964: Dorset

Career statistics
Competition	First-class
Matches	2
Runs scored	134
Batting average	33.50
100s/50s	–/1
Top score	85
Balls bowled	42
Wickets	–
Bowling average	–
5 wickets in innings	–
10 wickets in match	–
Best bowling	–
Catches/stumpings	–/–
- Source: Cricinfo, 7 February 2017

Michael Lindsay Dunning (11 March 1941 – 13 August 2020) was an English cricketer and army officer.

Born at Windsor, Berkshire, Dunning was educated at Eton College, where he captained the college cricket team in 1959. After leaving Eton, he enlisted in the army, where he served with the King's Royal Rifle Corps as part of the Royal Green Jackets. While serving in the army, Dunning was selected to play in two first-class matches for the Combined Services cricket team, playing both matches against Cambridge University in 1962 and 1964. He scored a total of 134 runs across both matches, with a high score of 85 in the 1962 fixture. He also played minor counties matches for Dorset, making three appearances in the 1964 Minor Counties Championship. He retired from military service in October 1973, holding the rank of captain. Upon retirement he was granted the honorary rank of major.
