= Stephen Goldring (cricketer) =

English cricketer and British Army officer (1932–2010)

Personal information
- Full name: Stephen Goldring
- Born: 18 November 1932; Portsmouth, Hampshire, England
- Died: 3 November 2010 (aged 77)
- Batting: Right-handed
- Bowling: Right-arm fast

Career statistics
| Competition | First-class |
|---|---|
| Matches | 1 |
| Runs scored | 23 |
| Batting average | – |
| 100s/50s | –/– |
| Top score | 14* |
| Balls bowled | 78 |
| Wickets | 0 |
| Bowling average | – |
| 5 wickets in innings | – |
| 10 wickets in match | – |
| Best bowling | – |
| Catches/stumpings | –/– |
- Source: Cricinfo, 15 March 2019

Stephen Goldring (18 November 1932 – 3 November 2010) was an English first-class cricketer and British Army officer.

== Biography ==
Born at Portsmouth, Goldring served in the Royal Army Ordnance Corps as a non-commissioned officer from 1960. He made one appearance in first-class cricket for the Combined Services cricket team against Oxford University at Aldershot in 1964. Batting twice in the match at number 11, Goldring made unbeaten scores of 9 and 14. He also bowled a total of thirteen wicketless overs across the match with his right-arm fast bowling.

Goldring became a commissioned officer in November 1969, when he was promoted from staff sergeant to second lieutenant, with seniority to November 1967. At the same time he was also promoted to the rank of lieutenant, with the same antedated seniority. He was promoted to the rank of captain in November 1971. He was awarded the Medal for Long Service and Good Conduct in July 1975, before promotion to the rank of major in June 1978. He retired from active service in July 1987. Goldring died on 3 November 2010, aged 77.
