= Joseph Lister (cricketer) =

English cricketer

Joseph Lister (14 May 1930 – 28 January 1991) was an English first-class cricketer, who played one first-class match for the Combined Services in 1951, two matches as an amateur for Yorkshire in 1954, plus twenty one games for Worcestershire between 1954 and 1959. He was later well known as a cricket administrator, serving as secretary of Yorkshire for twenty turbulent years from 1971, until his death at the age of 60 in 1991.

== Playing career ==
Born in Thirsk, Yorkshire, England, Lister represented the Rest against Southern Public Schools at Lord's in 1948 scoring 75 in eighty minutes. He also appeared for the Yorkshire Second XI (1953–1954), Worcestershire Second XI (1959–1971) and the Free Foresters (1957). He reappeared in a non first-class game for Worcestershire against Jamaica in 1970, captaining the side. Lawrence Rowe scored a hundred in his first innings and fifty in his second, both unbeaten, but the game ended in a draw.

In twenty four first-class matches overall, Lister as a right-handed batsman scored 796 runs at 20.41, and took 14 catches. He scored four 50s and came agonisingly close to what would have been a maiden century for Worcestershire against Kent at New Road, Worcester in 1955, the season he played twelve County Championship matches. Opening the batting he had reached 99, but was bowled by Colin Page. He did score 143 for Worcestershire Second XI. His uncle was the Yorkshire bowler George Macaulay.

== Cricket administration ==
Lister moved into cricket administration early in his career. From 1956, he was assistant secretary of Worcestershire, and, like other prominent amateurs of the period – including the then Worcestershire captain Peter Richardson – combined administration duties with playing. He was a successful captain of Worcestershire's Second XI, leading the team to the Second XI Championship in 1962 and 1963, and being credited with bringing forward some of the young cricketers who helped Worcestershire to the county's first-ever County Championship successes in 1964 and 1965.

Lister's years as secretary of Yorkshire were beset by controversy as the county side, accustomed to regular success throughout its history, went through its leanest years, with the captaincy and the committees frequently riven by faction and intrigue. Lister's diplomatic skills meant that the feuding remained in the committee rooms rather than spilling out on to the field of play, and he was also successful in deflecting continued criticism of the pitches and the crowds at Headingley which threatened, at times, its place as a regular Test venue.

He died in January 1991 in Granby, Harrogate, Yorkshire.
