= Eric Senior =

English cricketer and Royal Air Force officer

Personal information
- Full name: Eric Malcolm Senior
- Born: 6 October 1920; Shaftesbury, Dorset, England
- Died: 24 April 1970 (aged 49); Oxford, Oxfordshire, England
- Batting: Right-handed

Domestic team information
- Years: Team
- 1939–1946: Oxfordshire
- 1957–1958: Lincolnshire

Career statistics
Competition	First-class
Matches	1
Runs scored	1
Batting average	0.50
100s/50s	–/–
Top score	1
Catches/stumpings	–/–
- Source: Cricinfo, 16 February 2019

Eric Malcolm Senior (6 October 1920 – 24 April 1970) was an English first-class cricketer and Royal Air Force officer. Senior served in the latter stages of the Second World War with the Royal Air Force, in addition to playing first-class cricket for the Combined Services cricket team.

Senior was born at Shaftesbury in Dorset. He debuted in minor counties cricket for Oxfordshire in the 1939 Minor Counties Championship, playing in two matches. He joined the Royal Air Force in the latter stages of the Second World War as a pilot officer. Following the war, he a handful of minor counties matches for Oxfordshire in 1946. Remaining in the Royal Air Force after the war, he was promoted to the rank of flying officer in May 1946. He became a flight lieutenant in October 1950, with promotion to squadron leader in March 1956. He appeared for Lincolnshire in minor counties cricket in 1957 and 1958.

Senior retired from active service at his own request in October 1961, five months after appearing in a first-class cricket match for the Combined Services cricket team against Nottinghamshire at Trent Bridge. Senior scored one run in the match, which saw him dismissed by Roger Vowles in the Combined Services first-innings, and by Ian Davison in their second-innings.

He died at Oxford in April 1970.
