= Terence McIntyre =

English cricketer and Royal Air Force officer

Personal information
- Full name: Terence Frank McIntyre
- Born: 2 July 1930; Hendon, Middlesex, England
- Died: 24 December 2015 (aged 85); Hereford, England
- Batting: Right-handed
- Role: Wicket-keeper

Domestic team information
- Years: Team
- 1957–1960: Bedfordshire

Career statistics
| Competition | First-class |
|---|---|
| Matches | 5 |
| Runs scored | 87 |
| Batting average | 9.66 |
| 100s/50s | –/– |
| Top score | 36 |
| Catches/stumpings | 5/2 |
- Source: Cricinfo, 18 March 2019

Terence Frank McIntyre (2 July 1930 – 24 December 2015) was an English first-class cricketer and Royal Air Force officer.

While serving in the Royal Air Force as a non-commissioned officer, McIntyre made his debut in first-class cricket for the Combined Services cricket team against Somerset in 1959 at Taunton. Two years elapsed before his next appearance in first-class cricket for the Combined Services, when he made three appearances in 1961. He made a fifth and final first-class appearance for the Combined Services in against Oxford University in 1962. Playing as a wicket-keeper, McIntyre scored 87 runs across his five matches, averaging 9.66, with a high score of 36. Behind the stumps, he took five catches and made two stumpings. In addition to playing first-class cricket, McIntyre also appeared at minor counties level for Bedfordshire between 1957–1960, making seventeen appearances in the Minor Counties Championship.

He became a commissioned officer in July 1962, when he was promoted from sergeant to pilot officer. He was promoted to the rank of flying officer in April 1964, with seniority antedated to July 1962, with promotion to flight lieutenant following in July 1968. McIntyre retired at his own request in January 1973.

McIntyre died on 24 December 2015, at the age of 85.
