= Brian Parsons =

English cricketer

Personal information
- Full name: Arthur Brian Douglas Parsons
- Born: 20 September 1933; Guildford, Surrey
- Died: 11 February 1999 (aged 65); Chippenham, Wiltshire
- Nickname: Tich
- Height: 5 ft 4 in (1.63 m)
- Batting: Right-handed

Domestic team information
- Years: Team
- 1954 to 1955: Cambridge University
- 1956 to 1957: Combined Services
- 1958 to 1963: Surrey

Career statistics
Competition	FC	List A
Matches	152	1
Runs scored	6376	2
Batting average	26.45	2.00
100s/50s	3/33	0/0
Top score	125	2
Balls bowled	30	–
Wickets	0	–
Bowling average	–	–
5 wickets in innings	–	–
10 wickets in match	–	n/a
Best bowling	–	–
Catches/stumpings	69/–	1/–
- Source: Cricinfo, 17 April 2014

Arthur Brian Douglas Parsons (20 September 1933 – 11 February 1999) was an English cricketer who played first-class cricket from 1954 to 1964.

== Early career ==
Brian Parsons attended Brighton College, where he played for the first XI for six years, culminating in 1953 in the captaincy of the Public Schools team at Lord's.

He went up to Corpus Christi College, Cambridge and was immediately selected for the university team. On his debut in April 1954 he batted at number three, making 26 and 46 and adding 103 for the second wicket with Dennis Silk. Two weeks later he made 30 and 66, again at number three, against the Pakistan touring team. Thereafter his form fell away, and although he retained his place in the team he descended in the order, batting at seven and nine in the final match of the season against Oxford University.

Parsons had another mediocre season in 1955 but again kept his place. This time, after batting in several positions in the order, he opened the batting against Oxford.

National service as a gunner in the Army deprived Parsons of the opportunity to play in the university side in 1956. He played numerous matches for the Army and the Combined Services in 1956 and 1957, four of them first-class.

== County career ==
Parsons joined Surrey in 1958. Unlike most former university cricketers, he played as a professional. He made 468 runs at an average of 39.00 for the second XI, topping the county's averages. Surrey won their seventh consecutive County Championship title that year, and Parsons played only eight games for the senior side with moderate success. He played 10 matches in 1959, scoring 93 as an opener against Hampshire when the other batsmen were struggling, and finishing the season with 449 runs at 24.94.

He played a full season in 1960, scoring 1264 runs at 30.09. He scored his first century, 106 against Glamorgan, made in three and three-quarter hours out of a team total of 235. He did better still in 1961, scoring 1415 runs at 32.15 after being promoted to open the innings. He hit his second century, 125, once more against Glamorgan ("an attractive century in just over three hours") and was awarded his county cap.

In 1962 Parsons hit his third and last century, 125 against Cambridge University, but was less successful in the County Championship, where he made 723 runs at 23.32. After another moderately good season in 1963 (915 runs at 26.91) he retired from cricket to go into business. He played one final first-class match, for Marylebone Cricket Club (MCC), in 1964.
