= Douglas Meakin =

English cricketer and Royal Air Force airman

Personal information
- Full name: Douglas Meakin
- Born: 3 March 1929; Swadlincote, Derbyshire, England
- Died: 13 February 1998 (aged 68); Norwich, Norfolk, England
- Batting: Right-handed
- Bowling: Right-arm fast

Domestic team information
- Years: Team
- 1952–1962: Bedfordshire

Career statistics
Competition	First-class
Matches	4
Runs scored	55
Batting average	18.33
100s/50s	–/–
Top score	16
Balls bowled	412
Wickets	10
Bowling average	20.60
5 wickets in innings	–
10 wickets in match	–
Best bowling	4/56
Catches/stumpings	–/–
- Source: Cricinfo, 18 March 2019

Douglas Meakin (28 March 1929 – 13 February 1998) was an English first-class cricketer and Royal Air Force airman.

Meakin made his debut in minor counties cricket for Bedfordshire against Cambridgeshire at Luton in the 1952 Minor Counties Championship. He played minor counties cricket for Bedfordshire intermittently until 1962, making 21 appearances in the Minor Counties Championship. While serving as a non-commissioned officer in the Royal Air Force, Meakin played first-class cricket for the Combined Services cricket team, making his first-class debut against Warwickshire at Birmingham in 1959. He made a further appearance in 1959 against Somerset, before making two more first-class appearances in 1962 against Cambridge University and Ireland. He scored a total of 55 runs across his four matches, with a high score of 16. With his right-arm fast bowling, he took 10 wickets at an average of 20.60, with best figures of 4 for 56.

He died at Norwich in February 1998.
