= Frank Cecil Boys =

English cricketer and Royal Navy officer

Frank Boys
Personal information
- Full name: Frank Cecil Boys
- Born: 21 June 1918; Kensington, Middlesex, England
- Died: 27 March 2003 (aged 84); Dunsfold, Surrey, England
- Batting: Right-handed
- Bowling: Right-arm medium

Career statistics
Competition	First-class
Matches	7
Runs scored	273
Batting average	21.00
100s/50s	–/2
Top score	84
Catches/stumpings	4/–
- Source: Cricinfo, 9 March 2019

Frank Cecil Boys (21 June 1918 − 27 March 2003) was an English first-class cricketer and Royal Navy officer.

== Life, naval career and first-class cricket ==
Boys was born at Kensington and was educated at Dartmouth Naval College, graduating into the Royal Navy shortly before Second World War. He was promoted to the rank of sub-lieutenant in February 1939, with seniority antedated to May 1938. He served in the navy in the war, during which he was promoted to the rank of lieutenant in May 1940. In the later stages of the war he was mentioned in dispatches in November 1944 and December 1945.

Following the war, Boys made his debut in first-class cricket for the Combined Services cricket team against the touring South Africans at Portsmouth in 1947. He played first-class cricket for the Combined Services until 1951, making seven appearances. He scored a total of 273 runs in his seven first-class matches, at an average of 21.00. His highest score of 84 came against Essex in 1950. His performance, alongside 10 wickets in the match from Brian Close, took them close to victory in a match which ultimately ended as a draw.

Having been promoted to the rank of lieutenant commander in March 1948, he was promoted to the rank of commander in December 1953. He retired from the Royal Navy in May 1957. He died in March 2003 at Dunsfold, Surrey.
