= John Deighton (cricketer) =

English cricketer and army officer

Personal information
- Full name: John Harold Greenway Deighton
- Born: 5 April 1920; Prestwich, Lancashire, England
- Died: 15 September 1999 (aged 79); Kingsclere, Hampshire, England
- Batting: Right-handed
- Bowling: Right-arm fast-medium

Domestic team information
- Years: Team
- 1947 to 1962: Combined Services
- 1948 to 1950: Lancashire

Career statistics
Competition	First-class
Matches	35
Runs scored	994
Batting average	19.88
100s/50s	0/5
Top score	79
Balls bowled	6873
Wickets	127
Bowling average	24.25
5 wickets in innings	6
10 wickets in match	1
Best bowling	6/50
Catches/stumpings	17/0
- Source: Cricinfo, 25 October 2015

Colonel John Harold Greenway Deighton, MC, OBE (5 April 1920 – 15 September 1999) was an English army officer and cricketer who played first-class cricket from 1947 to 1962.

Deighton was educated at Denstone College, where he played for the First XI from 1937 to 1939, also appearing in the annual schools match at Lord's for The Rest against Lord's Schools in 1938 and 1939. He appeared in 35 first-class matches as a right-handed batsman who bowled right-arm fast-medium pace. He scored 994 runs with a highest score of 79 and held 17 catches. He took 127 wickets with a best analysis of six for 50. He played a few games of county cricket for Lancashire from 1948 to 1950, but most of his first-class cricket was for Combined Services, which he represented in 20 matches from 1947 to 1962.

Deighton served as an officer with the Northumberland Fusiliers in the Second World War, receiving the Military Cross for gallantry in Italy in 1944; he again served in the front line in the Korean War. He was awarded the OBE for his military service in 1964. His cricket was affected by the limited time he could spare from his army duties and by the shrapnel that remained in his arms and legs.
