= William Barber (cricketer, born 1919) =

English cricketer

Personal information
- Full name: William Langan Frederick Barber
- Born: 25 October 1919; Hackney, Middlesex, England
- Died: 26 November 1989 (aged 70); Middleton-on-Sea, Sussex, England
- Batting: Right-handed
- Role: Wicket-keeper

Career statistics
| Competition | First-class |
|---|---|
| Matches | 1 |
| Runs scored | 4 |
| Batting average | 4.00 |
| 100s/50s | –/– |
| Top score | 4 |
| Catches/stumpings | 3/– |
- Source: Cricinfo, 8 March 2019

William Langan Frederick Barber (25 November 1919 – 26 November 1989) was an English first-class cricketer and British Army officer.

Barber was born at Hackney. During the Second World War he played minor matches for Middlesex in 1940, before enlisting in the Royal Fusiliers as a second lieutenant in July 1944. He played one first-class cricket match for the Combined Services cricket team against Surrey at The Oval in 1946. Batting twice in the match, Barber was dismissed for 4 runs by Jim Laker in the Combined Services first-innings, while in their second-innings he ended not out without scoring in their innings total of 125 all out. Playing as the team wicket-keeper, Barber took three catches from behind the stumps.

He died at Middleton-on-Sea in November 1989.
