= Lancelot Grove =

English cricketer and British Army officer

Personal information
- Full name: Lancelot Townley Grove
- Born: 22 August 1905; Satara, Bombay Presidency, British India
- Died: 9 February 1943 (aged 37); Gander, Newfoundland
- Batting: Unknown
- Bowling: Unknown

Career statistics
Competition	First-class
Matches	4
Runs scored	332
Batting average	47.42
100s/50s	1/2
Top score	106
Balls bowled	42
Wickets	1
Bowling average	22.00
5 wickets in innings	–
10 wickets in match	–
Best bowling	1/11
Catches/stumpings	1/–
- Source: Cricinfo, 3 March 2019

Lancelot Townley Grove (22 August 1905 – 9 February 1943) was an English first-class cricketer and British Army officer. Attending the Royal Military Academy, Woolwich, Grove was commissioned into the Royal Engineers in 1925. He later played first-class cricket for the British Army and the Combined Services cricket team in the last 1930s. He served in the Second World War, during which he was killed in a plane crash in 1943.

== Life and military career ==
Grove was born at Satara in what was then British India to Colonel Percy Lynes Grove and his wife, Lorina. He was educated in England at Charterhouse School, before deciding on a career in the military and attending the Royal Military Academy, Woolwich. He graduated from Woolwich in September 1925, and was commissioned into the Royal Engineers as a second lieutenant. He was promoted to the rank of lieutenant in September 1927. He had to wait nearly a decade for his not promotion, which came in September 1936 when he was promoted to captain.

The following year he made his debut in first-class cricket for the British Army cricket team against the University of Oxford at Oxford, narrowly missing out on a century on debut when he was dismissed for 96 by Richard West in the Army's first-innings. He made a further appearance for the Army in 1937, against Cambridge University, with Grove scoring 75 in the Army's first-innings. He also played a first-class match in 1937 for a Combined Services cricket team against the touring New Zealanders at Portsmouth. Grove made a final first-class appearance for the Army against Cambridge University in 1938, making 106 in the Army's first-innings. In four first-class matches, Grove scored 332 runs at an average of 47.42.

He made an adjutant to Captain G. R. McMeekan in February 1938. He served with the Royal Engineers during the Second World War, with him being promoted to the rank of major in September 1942. Grove died when the Liberator he was aboard ran out of fuel during blizzard conditions and crashed at Gander in Newfoundland on 9 February 1943. He was buried at the Gander War Cemetery. Grove was survived by his wife, Joan Blanche Hill, and their son David, who would later serve as a major general in the British Army.
