= John Baskervyle-Glegg =

English cricketer

Major-General John Baskervyle-Glegg MBE
- Born: 10 November 1940; Windsor, Berkshire, England
- Died: 30 November 2004 (aged 64); Somerset, England
- Cricket career

Cricket information
- Batting: Right-handed

Career statistics
Competition	First-class
Matches	1
Runs scored	43
Batting average	21.50
100s/50s	–/–
Top score	35
Catches/stumpings	–/–
- Source: Cricinfo, 18 February 2019

John Baskervyle-Glegg MBE (10 November 1940 – 30 November 2004) was a British Army officer and an English first-class cricketer. Baskervyle-Glegg served with the Grenadier Guards in a military career that spanned from 1960–1994, rising to the rank of major-general. He also played first-class cricket for the Combined Services cricket team.

== Early life and career ==
Baskervyle-Glegg was born at Windsor to Lieutenant-Colonel John Baskervyle-Glegg and his wife, Ethne Woollan. He was educated at Eton College, where he was in the Cricket Eleven from 1957 to 1959 and captain of Nigel Wykes's outstanding house, before enlisting in the Grenadier Guards as a second lieutenant in November 1960. He played a first-class cricket match for the Combined Services cricket team against Ireland at Belfast in 1962. He batted twice during the match, scoring 35 in the Combined Services first-innings, before being dismissed by Rodney Bernstein, while in their second-innings he was dismissed by Archie McQuilken for 8 runs.

The following year he was promoted to the rank of lieutenant in April 1963, with seniority to June 1962. Four years later, in November 1967, he was promoted to the rank of captain. It was around this time that he served in Northern Ireland during the early years of The Troubles.

== Senior ranks and later career ==
He became a major in December 1972. He was a Member of the Order of the British Empire in the 1974 New Year Honours. Promotion to lieutenant colonel came in December 1979, with Baskervyle-Glegg commanding the 1st Battalion Grenadier Guards between 1980 and 1982. He was promoted to colonel in December 1984, with seniority to June 1984. He was a member of the British Military Advisory Training Team advising the Zimbabwe National Army from 1987–1989. By September 1990, he held the rank of brigadier. It was at this time he was appointed as the senior British Loan Service Officer to the Sultan of Oman's Armed Forces, at which stage he was appointed to the acting rank of major general. A month later he was promoted to the substantive rank of major general, with seniority to October 1988. This coincided with service during the Gulf War. He retired from active service in February 1994, at which point he was appointed to the Reserve of Officers.

He died suddenly at Somerset in November 2004, and was buried at St. Mary the Virgin Church in Rimpton. He was pre-deceased by his wife, Jane van der Noot, whom he married in 1974.
