= Derek Semmence =

English cricketer (1938–2020)

Personal information
- Full name: Derek John Semmence
- Born: 20 April 1938; Worthing, Sussex, England
- Died: 29 March 2020 (aged 81)
- Nickname: Semmo
- Batting: Right-handed
- Bowling: Right-arm medium

Domestic team information
- Years: Team
- 1956–1959: Sussex
- 1957–1958: Combined Services
- 1962: Essex
- 1964–1966: Devon
- 1967–1968: Sussex
- 1973–1974: Northumberland
- 1976: Cambridgeshire

Career statistics
Competition	First-class
Matches	39
Runs scored	890
Batting average	14.59
100s/50s	1/2
Top score	108
Balls bowled	156
Wickets	1
Bowling average	123.00
5 wickets in innings	0
10 wickets in match	0
Best bowling	1/43
Catches/stumpings	24/–
- Source: Cricinfo, 19 April 2011

Derek John Semmence (20 April 1938 – 29 March 2020) was an English cricketer. Semmence was a right-handed batsman who bowled right-arm medium pace. He was born in Worthing, Sussex.

Semmence made his first-class cricket debut for Sussex County Cricket Club against Warwickshire in the 1956 County Championship. He played first-class cricket for Sussex until 1959. Semmence served in the Royal Air Force in his early years with Sussex, which in 1957 entitled him to play first-class cricket for the Combined Services, firstly against Surrey. He played two further matches for the Combined Services, one in 1957 against Worcestershire and another in 1958 against Warwickshire. Having last played first-class cricket in 1958, Semmence made a single first-class appearance for Essex in 1962 against Oxford University.

In 1964, he joined Devon, making his debut for the county in the 1964 Minor Counties Championship against Berkshire. He played Minor counties cricket for Devon until 1966, making nine appearances. Semmence returned to Sussex in 1967, playing six first-class matches for the county from 1967 to 1968. A somewhat inconsistent batsman at the first-class level, in 35 first-class matches for Sussex he scored 841 runs at a batting average of 15.57, with two half centuries and a single century high score of 108 against Nottinghamshire in his debut 1956 season. Semmence was the youngest Sussex player to score a century for the county, a record which remains to this day.

Semmence later played Minor Counties Championship cricket for Northumberland from 1973 to 1974, making 24 appearances. He played a single Minor Counties Championship match for Cambridgeshire in 1976 against Bedfordshire. Semmence was the president of Worthing Cricket Club and previously coached youth cricket for Rajasthan in India.
