= Fred Roberts (RAF officer) =

Welsh cricketer and Royal Air Force officer

Personal information
- Full name: John Frederick Roberts
- Born: 24 February 1913; Pontardawe, Wales
- Died: 20 April 1996 (aged 83)
- Batting: Left-handed
- Role: Batsman

Domestic team information
- Years: Team
- 1934–1936: Glamorgan
- 1946–1949: Combined Services

Career statistics
Competition	First-class
Matches	8
Runs scored	204
Batting average
100s/50s	–/–
Top score	52
Catches/stumpings
- Source: CricketArchive

Air Vice-Marshal John Frederick Roberts, CB, CBE (24 February 1913 – 20 April 1996) was a Welsh cricketer and Royal Air Force officer.

Fred Roberts was born in Pontardawe and educated at Pontardawe Grammar School. Playing for Glamorgan from 1934 to 1936 and for Combined Services from 1946 to 1949, he appeared in eight first-class matches as a left-handed batsman. He scored 204 runs with a highest score of 52.

He joined the Royal Air Force in 1938, served in the Middle East during World War II and was mentioned in despatches. After the war he rose to the rank of air vice-marshal and was appointed a CBE and CB. He was the RAF's Director General of Ground Training.
