= John Vernon (English cricketer) =

English cricketer and Royal Navy sailor

Personal information
- Full name: John Michael Vernon
- Born: 27 July 1922; Port Said, Egypt
- Died: November 1994 (aged 72); Portsmouth, Hampshire, England
- Batting: Right-handed
- Bowling: Right-arm medium

Career statistics
Competition	First-class
Matches	8
Runs scored	290
Batting average	22.30
100s/50s	–/2
Top score	83
Balls bowled	165
Wickets	2
Bowling average	50.00
5 wickets in innings	–
10 wickets in match	–
Best bowling	1/8
Catches/stumpings	5/–
- Source: Cricinfo, 8 March 2019

John Michael Vernon (27 July 1922 – November 1994) was an English first-class cricketer and Royal Navy sailor.

Vernon was born at Port Said in Egypt. He was educated in England at Tonbridge School. During the Second World War he played minor matches for Sussex. While later serving in the Royal Navy, Vernon made his debut in first-class cricket for the Combined Services cricket team against Warwickshire at Edgaston in 1949. He played first-class cricket for the Combined Services until 1952, making eight appearances. He scored a total of 290 runs across his eight matches, with a batting average of 22.30 and a high score of 83.

Vernon died at Portsmouth in November 1994.
