= David Pratt (cricketer) =

English cricketer

Personal information
- Born: 20 July 1938 (age 88); Watford, England
- Batting: Right-handed
- Bowling: Slow left-arm orthodox

Domestic team information
- Years: Team
- 1959: Worcestershire
- 1961: Combined Services
- 1962: Nottinghamshire

Career statistics
Competition	FC
Matches	18
Runs scored	50
Batting average	3.12
100s/50s	0/0
Top score	14
Balls bowled	2,680
Wickets	23
Bowling average	49.60
5 wickets in innings	1
10 wickets in match	0
Best bowling	5-54
Catches/stumpings	4/0
- Source: CricketArchive, 19 October 2008

David Pratt (born 20 July 1938) is a former English first-class cricketer who played between 1959 and 1962 for three different teams. He also played minor counties cricket for Hertfordshire. He was a specialist bowler, and his batting at number 11 didn't rival his bowling talent.

He made his first-class debut for Worcestershire in May 1959 against Derbyshire at Chesterfield, but took no wickets. He did not play in the first-team again until early August, when Worcestershire played Surrey at Worcester, but he then produced what was to remain a career-best performance. After going wicketless in the first innings, second time around he took 5-54, all his victims being current or future Test cricketers: Micky Stewart, Ken Barrington, Eric Bedser, Jim Laker and Alec Bedser.

He stayed in the team throughout August, but took only eight more wickets in six games. In 1960, whilst attending his National Service he played no professional cricket at all. He was succeeded at Worcester by Norman Gifford. After completing his service in 1961 he played for Combined Services against Nottinghamshire and Northamptonshire as well as a touring South Africa Fezelas side, taking six wickets in all. He returned to county cricket in 1962 with Nottinghamshire, playing seven first-class games (in which he took just four wickets) but otherwise being confined to the Second XI. Reflecting the start of his career, in his final match (against Gloucestershire) both his victims were Test players: Arthur Milton and David Smith.

David gave up professional cricket in the mid 60's but still played locally and as Captain lead his 1st team to win the Home Counties and Cherwell Leagues for a number of years in the 1980s.

David was still topping the bowling averages when he retired from cricket in 1988. A natural sportsman, he took up golf and was soon playing off an 8 handicap.
