= Bill Atkins (cricketer) =

English cricketer

Personal information
- Full name: Gerald Atkins
- Born: 4 May 1938 (age 88); Great Missenden, Buckinghamshire, England
- Batting: Left-handed
- Bowling: Right-arm leg break

Domestic team information
- Years: Team
- 1957–1972: Buckinghamshire
- 1960–1961: Cambridge University

Career statistics
Competition	First-class	List A
Matches	20	3
Runs scored	394	16
Batting average	11.93	8.00
100s/50s	0/0	0/0
Top score	49	16
Balls bowled	150	0
Wickets	2	–
Bowling average	48.00	–
5 wickets in innings	0	–
10 wickets in match	0	–
Best bowling	2/25	–
Catches/stumpings	8/–	0/–
- Source: Cricinfo, 8 May 2011

Gerald Atkins (born 14 May 1938), known as Bill Atkins, is a former English first-class cricketer. Atkins was a left-handed batsman who bowled leg break. He was born in Great Missenden, Buckinghamshire.

Atkins made his debut for Buckinghamshire in the 1957 Minor Counties Championship against Oxfordshire. Atkins served in the British Army, and it was for a Combined Services team that he made his first-class debut for against Warwickshire in 1958. He played a further first-class match the following season for the team against Somerset. The season following that, he made his first-class debut for Cambridge University against Surrey. He played 17 further first-class matches for the University, the last coming against Kent in 1961. In his 18 first-class matches for the University, Atkins scored 338 runs at a batting average of 11.65, with a high score of 49.

While playing first-class cricket, he also continued to play Minor counties cricket for Buckinghamshire, representing the county to 1972 and making 107 Minor Counties Championship appearances. He made his List A debut for Buckinghamshire in the 1965 Gillette Cup against Middlesex. He played 2 further List A matches for the county, both coming in the 1970 Gillette Cup against Bedfordshire and Hampshire. In his 3 List A matches, he scored 16 runs at an average of 8.00, with a high score of 16.
