= Philip Hodgson =

English cricketer

Philip Hodgson (21 September 1935 – 30 March 2015) was an English first-class cricketer.

== Biography ==
Hodgson was born in Todmorden, Yorkshire, and educated at Woodhouse Grammar School in London. He was six feet eight inches tall.

A right arm fast medium bowler, Hodgson played thirteen games for Yorkshire County Cricket Club between 1954 and 1956. During his national service with the Royal Air Force he appeared in four matches for the Combined Services in first-class games in 1956 and 1957. In non-first-class cricket he played for the Yorkshire Second XI (1952–1956), the Royal Air Force (1956–1957), and Minor Counties (1956).

Hodgson took 39 wickets in first-class cricket at an average of 24.25, with a best return of 5 for 41 against Sussex in 1954, his only five wicket haul, when he and his opening partner Fred Trueman took five wickets each. He scored 65 runs at 9.28, with a highest score of 26 for the Combined Services against Glamorgan. He batted at number 11, and was not called upon to bat until his seventh match for Yorkshire.

After his brief first-class career he worked as a schoolteacher, playing club cricket for Sheffield United. He died in 2015.
