= Rodney Pratt =

English cricketer

Personal information
- Full name: Rodney Lynes Pratt
- Born: 15 November 1938; Stoney Stanton, Leicestershire
- Batting: Right-handed
- Bowling: Right-arm medium-fast
- Role: All-rounder

Domestic team information
- Years: Team
- 1955–64: Leicestershire
- First-class debut: 18 June 1955 Leicestershire v Nottinghamshire
- Last First-class: 18 August 1964 Leicestershire v Hampshire
- List A debut: 1 May 1963 Leicestershire v Lancashire
- Last List A: 27 May 1964 Leicestershire v Northamptonshire

Career statistics
Competition	First-class	List A
Matches	102	2
Runs scored	1,824	31
Batting average	13.41	15.50
100s/50s	0/4	0/0
Top score	80	25
Balls bowled	14,518	90
Wickets	259	3
Bowling average	25.96	25.00
5 wickets in innings	11	0
10 wickets in match	2	0
Best bowling	7/47	3/75
Catches/stumpings	70/–	0/–
- Source: CricketArchive, 9 January 2014

Rodney Lynes Pratt (born 15 November 1938) is a former English cricketer who played first-class cricket for Leicestershire between 1955 and 1964. He was a right-handed lower-order batsman and a right-arm medium-fast bowler. He was born at Stoney Stanton in Leicestershire.

== Cricket career ==
Pratt was just 16 when he made his first-class cricket debut for Leicestershire in 1955, and only 17 when he took 10 Somerset wickets for a total of 60 runs in a match in 1956. But after this promising start he largely disappeared from county cricket for the next three seasons, making only occasional appearances for Leicestershire while he was doing his National Service, but playing also in a handful of first-class games for the Combined Services cricket team. In one of those occasional Leicestershire games in the summer of 1959 he revealed hitherto unseen batting skills: it was his 19th first-class game, and his innings of 80 against Essex was a bigger total than all of his previous innings combined, and was to remain his highest score.

Pratt returned to county cricket in 1960 and for the next four seasons was a fairly regular member of the Leicestershire first team, usually acting as the third seam bowler after Terry Spencer and, often, Brian Boshier and batting around No 7 in the order – Leicestershire in this period had a very long tail. He had some successes as a batsman: in June 1960, for example, he made 71 against Hampshire and later in the same month there was 62 against Nottinghamshire. He did not improve on his previous best bowling figures in 1960, but in 1961 against Glamorgan, opening the bowling with Spencer, he took seven for 47 and these were the best bowling figures of his career. He took 65 wickets in 1961, and this was the best seasonal return of his career. Pratt missed the whole of the first half of the 1962 season, not appearing in the first team until July, a period in which Leicestershire failed to record a single victory in 13 County Championship matches. He then took 50 wickets and, although Leicestershire still finished at the bottom of the Championship table, in the last game of the season they came close to beating the Champions, Yorkshire, with Pratt taking 11 wickets in the match.

Pratt's first-class career then tailed off in the 1963 and 1964 seasons: in 1963, he was a regular in the team until the end of June, but then reappeared in only the last two games; and in 1964, he made only eight first-class appearances. In both seasons, he played in Leicestershire's single matches in the Gillette Cup one-day competition. He scored 25 and took the first three wickets, albeit expensively, in the first-ever English List A match in 1963; Leicestershire were so comprehensively thumped in 1964 that he did not even get on to bowl. At the end of the 1964 season, he left the Leicestershire staff.
