= Richard Earnshaw =

English cricketer

Personal information
- Full name: Richard Oliver Earnshaw
- Born: 8 January 1939; Huddersfield, Yorkshire, England
- Died: 28 July 1963 (aged 24); Westminster, London, England
- Batting: Right-handed
- Bowling: Right-arm fast-medium

Career statistics
Competition	First-class
Matches	2
Runs scored	11
Batting average	5.50
100s/50s	–/–
Top score	9
Balls bowled	402
Wickets	0
Bowling average	–
5 wickets in innings	–
10 wickets in match	–
Best bowling	–
Catches/stumpings	–/–
- Source: Cricinfo, 16 March 2019

Richard Oliver Earnshaw (8 January 1939 – 28 July 1963) was an English first-class cricketer.

While undertaking his National Service in the Royal Electrical and Mechanical Engineers, Earnshaw played first-class cricket for the Combined Services cricket team, making his debut against the touring South Africans at Portsmouth in 1960. He made a second first-class appearance in 1961, against Northamptonshire at Northampton. He scored 11 runs across his two matches, as well as bowling 67 wicketless overs with his right-arm fast-medium bowling, conceding 211 runs.

He died at Westminster in July 1963, aged just 24.
