= Arthur Coomb =

English cricketer (1929–2022)

Personal information
- Full name: Arthur Grenfell Coomb
- Born: 3 March 1929; Kempston, Bedfordshire, England
- Died: 29 June 2022 (aged 93)
- Batting: Right-handed
- Bowling: Right-arm medium-fast

Domestic team information
- Years: Team
- 1956–1963: Norfolk
- 1951–1953: Minor Counties
- 1947–1955: Bedfordshire

Career statistics
Competition	First-class
Matches	5
Runs scored	55
Batting average	9.16
100s/50s	–/–
Top score	16
Balls bowled	628
Wickets	8
Bowling average	40.12
5 wickets in innings	–
10 wickets in match	–
Best bowling	3/61
Catches/stumpings	1/–
- Source: Cricinfo, 17 November 2013

Arthur Grenfell Coomb (3 March 1929 - 29 June 2022) was a former English cricketer who was active in the 1940s, 1950s and 1960s, making five appearances in first-class cricket. He was a right-handed batsman who bowled right-arm medium-fast and who played most of his cricket at minor counties level for Bedfordshire and Norfolk.

== Early life ==
Arthur Grenfell Coomb was born at Kempston, Bedfordshire, on 3 March 1929. He was educated at Bedford Modern School between 1938 and 1947 where he was in the First XI in 1944 and 1945 being made Captain in 1946. He was also a keen rugby player and was made Captain of the First XV in 1946.

Coomb undertook National Service between 1947 and 1949, and thereafter studied at agricultural college, later working in the agricultural supply industry for an American firm.

== Cricket ==
Coomb made his debut for Bedfordshire in the 1947 Minor Counties Championship against Oxfordshire, a season in which he made three further appearances for the county. While serving in the Royal Navy, Coomb was selected to play for the Combined Services cricket team in a first-class match against Worcestershire in 1948, and made two further first-class appearances for the team in 1949 against Kent and Hampshire. He continued to play minor counties cricket for Bedfordshire during this period, and was selected to play a first-class match for a combined Minor Counties cricket team against Kent in 1951. He played a second first-class match for the Minor Counties against the touring Australians in 1953.

In five appearances in first-class cricket, Coomb took 8 wickets at an average of 40.12, with best figures of 3/16, and he scored 55 runs with a high score of 16. He played for Bedfordshire until 1955, making a total of 40 appearances for them in the Minor Counties Championship. He joined Norfolk for the 1956 Minor Counties Championship, making his debut for the county against Buckinghamshire. He played for Norfolk until 1963, making 42 appearances.
