= Chris Walton (cricketer) =

English cricketer (1933–2006)

Personal information
- Full name: Arthur Christopher Walton
- Born: 26 September 1933; Georgetown, British Guiana
- Died: 2 February 2006 (aged 72); Mollymook, New South Wales, Australia
- Batting: Right-handed

Career statistics
Competition	First-class
Matches	85
Runs scored	3,797
Batting average	24.81
100s/50s	3/21
Top score	152
Catches/stumpings	46/–
- Source: CricketArchive, 7 November 2022

Arthur Christopher Walton (26 September 1933 – 2 February 2006) was an English cricketer.

Chris Walton was born in Georgetown in British Guiana and educated at Radley College and Lincoln College, Oxford. He was an attacking right-handed batsman who represented Combined Services, D. R. Jardine's XI, the Gentlemen, Oxford University and Middlesex in 85 first-class matches between 1953 and 1959, scoring 3,797 runs. He was awarded cricket blues by Oxford in 1955, 1956 and 1957 and he captained Oxford in his final year. He scored 57 in his Varsity match debut and scored 1,200 runs (average 38.70) in 1956 and 956 runs in 1957. He played in 35 matches for Middlesex (1957–1959) and he was awarded his county cap in 1957.

He later emigrated to Australia and died in Mollymook, New South Wales, aged 72.
