= Roger Moylan-Jones =

English cricketer and Royal Navy officer

Rear Admiral Roger Moylan-Jones CEng FIMechE
- Born: Roger Charles Moylan-Jones; 18 April 1940 (age 86); Torquay, Devon, England
- Cricket career

Cricket information
- Batting: Right-handed
- Bowling: Right-arm off break

Domestic team information
- Years: Team
- 1964: Combined Services
- 1959-1975: Devon

Career statistics
Competition	First-class
Matches	1
Runs scored	34
Batting average	17.00
100s/50s	–/–
Top score	31
Balls bowled	84
Wickets	2
Bowling average	18.00
5 wickets in innings	–
10 wickets in match	–
Best bowling	2/36
Catches/stumpings	–/–
- Source: Cricinfo, 9 March 2011

Rear Admiral Roger Charles Moylan-Jones (born 18 April 1940) is a former English cricketer and Royal Navy officer. Moylan-Jones was a right-handed batsman who bowled right-arm off break. He was born in Torquay, Devon and educated at King Edward VI Grammar School in Totnes.

Moylan-Jones first represented the Royal Navy in cricket in 1959. This was also the year in which he made his Minor Counties Championship debut for Devon against Dorset. An infrequent performer for Devon due to his naval commitments meant he was limited to just 28 appearances for the county between 1959 and 1975, playing his final match for them against the Somerset Second XI. He played just one first-class match, which came for the Combined Services against Oxford University. In the Oxford University first-innings he took his only 2 first-class wickets, those of Maurice Manasseh and Richard Gilliat, for the cost of 36 runs. With the bat he scored 3 runs in the Combined Services first-innings before being dismissed by John Martin and in their second-innings he scored 31 runs, being dismissed this time by Andrew Barker.

In the Royal Navy, Moylan-Jones rose to the rank of rear admiral and later served as the president of the Royal Navy Cricket Club 1993–1995 and Director General Aircraft (Navy) from 1992 to 1995. Moylan-Jones became chairman of Devon County Cricket Club in 1997, a post he held until 2009 when he stepped down, being replaced by Geoff Evans. Following this he became club president, taking over from the late David Shepherd.
