= Michael Laws (cricketer) =

English cricketer (born 1926)

Personal information
- Full name: Michael Lutener Laws
- Born: 12 August 1926; Finchley, Middlesex, England
- Died: 19 November 2017 (aged 91)
- Batting: Right-handed
- Role: Wicketkeeper

Domestic team information
- Years: Team
- 1948 to 1950: Middlesex

Career statistics
Competition	FC
Matches	8
Runs scored	19
Batting average	3.80
100s/50s	0/0
Top score	12
Balls bowled	0
Wickets	–
Bowling average	–
5 wickets in innings	–
10 wickets in match	–
Best bowling	–
Catches/stumpings	10/5
- Source: Cricinfo, 5 July 2018

Michael Lutener Laws (12 August 1926 – 19 November 2017) was an English former cricketer who played eight games of first-class cricket, mostly for Middlesex, between 1946 and 1950. He was born in Finchley and attended Highgate School. An amateur cricketer, he played as a wicketkeeper.

Laws died in South Africa on 19 November 2017 at the age of 91.
