= Colin Matthews (cricketer) =

English cricketer

Personal information
- Full name: Colin Stuart Matthews
- Born: 17 October 1931; Worksop, Nottinghamshire, England
- Died: 15 March 1990 (aged 58); Worksop, Nottinghamshire, England
- Batting: Right-handed
- Bowling: Left-arm medium pace
- Role: Bowler

Domestic team information
- Years: Team
- 1950–1959: Nottinghamshire

Career statistics
Competition	First-class
Matches	85
Runs scored	493
Batting average	7.35
100s/50s	–/–
Top score	41
Balls bowled	12,321
Wickets	147
Bowling average	36.95
5 wickets in innings	4
10 wickets in match	–
Best bowling	6/65
Catches/stumpings	38/–
- Source: CricketArchive, 11 November 2024

Colin Stuart Matthews (17 October 1931 – 15 March 1990) was an English first-class cricketer who played for Nottinghamshire from 1950 to 1959. He was born and died in Worksop.
