= John Rawlence =

English cricketer and soldier

Personal information
- Full name: John Rooke Rawlence
- Born: 23 September 1915; Brockenhurst, Hampshire, England
- Died: 17 January 1983 (aged 67); Ascot, Berkshire, England
- Batting: Right-handed

Domestic team information
- Years: Team
- 1934: Hampshire

Career statistics
Competition	First-class
Matches	5
Runs scored	87
Batting average	14.50
100s/50s	–/–
Top score	38
Catches/stumpings	3/–
- Source: Cricinfo, 14 February 2010

John Rooke Rawlence OBE (23 September 1915 – 17 January 1983) was an English first-class cricketer and British Army officer.

The son of Dr. H. E. Rawlence, he was born in September 1915 at Brockenhurst, Hampshire. He was educated at Wellington College, where he played for the college cricket team. Rawlence made two appearances in first-class cricket for Hampshire against Northamptonshire and Nottinghamshire in the 1934 County Championship. Against Nottinghamshire at Southampton, he scored 38 runs and helped to put on 60 runs for the seventh wicket in just over half an hour with Len Creese. From Wellington, he pursued a career in the British Army and attended the Royal Military Academy, Woolwich. He graduated from there into the Royal Engineers as a second lieutenant in August 1935. Alongside his nascent military career, Rawlence also studied at Pembroke College, Cambridge and graduated from there in 1937.

Following his graduation from Cambridge, Rawlence was promoted to lieutenant in the Royal Engineers in August 1938. In that same year, he made two first-class appearances for the British Army cricket team against Cambridge University and Oxford University. He served in the Second World War, during which he was promoted to captain in August 1943, and was made a MBE in February 1945. Promotion to major followed after the war in August 1948. Twelve years after his previous first-class appearance, Rawlence played for the Combined Services cricket team in a first-class fixture against Glamorgan at Cardiff in June 1950. In the Royal Engineers, promotion to lieutenant colonel came in September 1956, whilst in the 1957 New Year Honours, his order of chivalry was upgraded to OBE. Rawlence was promoted to colonel in April 1959,

After retiring from the military, he returned to Pembroke College to study for his master's degree, graduating in 1965. Rawlence died on 17 January 1983 at Heatherwood Hospital in Ascot, Berkshire.
