= Gordon McKinna =

English cricketer and footballer

Personal information
- Full name: Gordon Hayden McKinna
- Born: 2 August 1930; Sale, Cheshire, England
- Died: 1 July 2007 (aged 76); Warwick, Warwickshire, England
- Batting: Right-handed
- Bowling: Right-arm medium

Domestic team information
- Years: Team
- 1949–1953: Cheshire
- 1951–1953: Oxford University

Career statistics
Competition	First-class
Matches	6
Runs scored	40
Batting average	6.66
100s/50s	–/–
Top score	18
Balls bowled	948
Wickets	17
Bowling average	23.00
5 wickets in innings	–
10 wickets in match	–
Best bowling	4/39
Catches/stumpings	1/–
- Source: Cricinfo, 28 February 2019

Gordon Hayden McKinna (2 August 1930 – 1 July 2007) was an English first-class cricketer and amateur footballer.

McKinna was born at Sale and was educated at Manchester Grammar School. During his youth, McKinna played football for Manchester United youth sides. He debuted in minor counties cricket for Cheshire in the 1949 Minor Counties Championship, playing two matches.

From Manchester Grammar, McKinna went up to Brasenose College, Oxford. While at Oxford he played first-class cricket for Oxford University, debuting in 1951 against Middlesex at Oxford. He did not appear for Oxford University in 1952, but did feature in four matches in 1953, including that seasons University Match against Cambridge University at Lord's. He bowled tidily in the match with his right-arm medium pace, taking 2 for 17 from fourteen overs in the Cambridge first-innings, including the wicket of future West Indies Test wicket-keeper Gerry Alexander. In five first-class matches for Oxford he took 16 wickets. He continued to play minor counties matches for Cheshire while at Oxford, making nine appearances in the Minor Counties Championship between 1949 and 1953.

An all-round sportsman, McKinna also played football for Oxford University A.F.C., for which he won a blue. He played for Pegasus in the final of 1953 FA Amateur Cup in front of a full house at Wembley. He partnered Gerry Alexander at full-back in the match, with Pegasus defeating Harwich & Parkeston 6–0. He played amateur internationals for England in 1953, making five appearances.

After graduating from Oxford, McKinna carried out his national service in the Royal Air Force as a pilot officer. While undertaking his national service, McKinna appeared in one first-class match for the Combined Services cricket team against Warwickshire at Edgbaston in 1955. He played no regular cricket after his national service, with McKinna taking up a job in the City of London. He died at Warwick in July 2007.
