= Janet Meakin Poor =

American landscape design specialist (1929–2017)

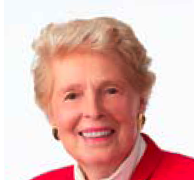
- Janet Meakin Poor circa 2009
- Born: November 27, 1929; Cincinnati, Ohio, US
- Died: June 21, 2017 (aged 87); Winnetka, Illinois
- Occupation: Landscape design specialist
- Known for: plant conservation

Janet Meakin Poor (November 27, 1929 – June 21, 2017, Cincinnati, Ohio) was a landscape design specialist based out of Winnetka, Illinois. She was the great great niece of American impressionist painter Lewis Henry Meakin.

== Education ==
Poor received her education at University of Cincinnati. She later continued her studies at Triton College in River Grove before entering University of Wisconsin-Madison for landscape design and horticulture.

== Career ==
She was vice president of the Garden Club of America, vice chairman on the board of trustees of the Center For Plant Conservation, chair of Open Days; 1989–2000, a showcase of hundreds of American gardens by the national organization The Garden Conservancy, advisor to the historic country estate at the Filoli Center near San Francisco, on the awards committee at the Winterthur Museum and Country Estate in Delaware, a board member with the American Horticultural Society, and a member of the advisory council of the United States National Arboretum, an appointment by the United States Secretary of Agriculture. She was also an advisor on the McKee Botanical Garden.

She was a driving force behind saving and conserving the planet's botanical heritage. At 40, she decided to pursue her passion for plants in earnest. She cobbled together a landscape architecture degree from three different schools, traveling as far away as the University of Wisconsin–Madison to study.

The mother of two then launched a career that led her to the forefront of plant conservation and landscape design locally, nationally and internationally, including serving as board chair of the Chicago Botanic Garden, where she headed an ambitious program to collect seeds from the world's endangered plants. The Chicago Botanic Garden (CBG) took a leading conservation role nationally and internationally under Poor's leadership. She encouraged CBG into its participation in the international Millennium Seed Bank Project. By 2010, seeds from thousands of the world's rare and threatened plants will be stored, some of them in Glencoe.

She played a major role in the development of the new Daniel F. and Ada L. Rice Plant Conservation Science Center at CBG, which provides laboratories and teaching facilities for more than 200 PhD scientists, land managers, students and interns. It opened in September 2009.

== Personal life ==
She was married to Edward King Poor III in 1951, a partner in a recruiting firm and a keen golfer who served in the U.S. Army in World War II. He died in 2002. She outlived him by 15 years, eventually dying from complications of a stroke in Evanston Hospital. Prior to her death, she lived in the same house in Winnetka for fifty years.

She had two sons: E.King Poor, a partner in a Chicago law firm and Thomas Meakin Poor, owner of the Bin 66 Fine Wine and Spirits in Rehoboth Beach, Delaware.

== Books ==
Poor was the editor of two books:

- Poor, Janet Meakin, ed. (1984). Plants That Merit Attention, Volume I: Trees. Portland, Oregon, USA: Timber Press. ISBN 0-917304-75-6.
- Poor, Janet Meakin, ed. (1996). Plants That Merit Attention, Volume II: Shrubs. Portland, Oregon, USA: Timber Press. ISBN 0-88192-347-8.

== Janet Meakin Poor Symposium ==
The Janet Meakin Poor Symposium at the Chicago Botanic Garden was created to highlight the increasing need for a cooperative international plant conservation effort to better understand the impact of climate change on plants. Some of the best plant conservation research, practice, and outreach from around the globe will be highlighted. Internationally recognized experts will discuss global strategies for plant conservation through science and education. The Symposium is partially endowed by the friends of Janet Meakin Poor.

== Awards ==
Poor's awards include:

- Catherine H Sweeney Award from the American Horticultural Society
- Hutchinson Award from the Chicago Horticultural Society 1994
- Creative Leadership Award and Medal of Honor from the Garden Club of America
- American Horticultural Society Book Award (for Plants That Merit Attention: Shrubs)
- Chicago Botanic Garden Horticulture Society Medal 1995 | Gold Medal Garden Design 1974
