= Malcolm Scott (English cricketer) =

English cricketer (1936–2020)

Personal information
- Full name: Malcolm Ernest Scott
- Born: 8 May 1936; Westoe, South Shields, County Durham, England
- Died: 11 September 2020 (aged 84); Stourport-on-Severn, Worcestershire, England
- Batting: Right-handed
- Bowling: Slow left-arm orthodox

Domestic team information
- Years: Team
- 1959 to 1969: Northamptonshire

Career statistics
Competition	FC	LA
Matches	185	11
Runs scored	2,445	44
Batting average	12.86	11.00
100s/50s	0/1	0/0
Top score	62	19*
Balls bowled	28,637	554
Wickets	461	19
Bowling average	24.72	13.84
5 wickets in innings	20	0
10 wickets in match	4	–
Best bowling	7/32	3/6
Catches/stumpings	92/–	6/–
- Source: Cricinfo, 1 September 2023

Malcolm Ernest Scott (8 May 1936 – 11 September 2020) was an English cricketer and footballer of the 1950s and 1960s.

Scott played first-class cricket for Northamptonshire from 1959 to 1969. He was an accurate left-arm orthodox spin bowler who batted right-handed in the tail. His best season was 1964, when he took 113 wickets, including 6 for 62 and 7 for 32 against Sussex, who nevertheless won the match. In 1969, in his first match in the John Player League, he opened the bowling and took 3 for 6 from eight overs.

Scott was a reserved person, and was reluctant to appeal for dismissals. An injury to his left shoulder and suspicions about the legitimacy of his bowling action hampered his later career, and he retired after the 1969 season.

Scott played as a centre half in the Football League for Newcastle United, Darlington and York City between 1956 and 1964.

Scott later coached in South Africa before returning to England to work as a social worker with young offenders. In 2009, he wrote his autobiography, A Geordie All-Rounder: An Autobiography of a South Shields Sportsman.

Scott died in September 2020, aged 84. His wife Mary died in 2017; they had no children.
