= Royal Air Force Sports Ground =

Cricket ground in Uxbridge, England

Coordinates: 51.5402°N 0.4589°W

- Vine Lane

Ground information
- Location: Uxbridge, Middlesex
- Establishment: 1939 (first recorded match)

Team information
Combined Services	(1964)
- As of 22 August 2010; Source: CricketArchive

The Royal Air Force Sports Ground is a cricket ground in Uxbridge, situated behind RAF Uxbridge. The ground also goes by the name of Vine Lane, a nearby main road. It was first used in 1939 by the RAF. Teams such as the MCC, the Middlesex Cricket Board, the Army, Middlesex youth teams and the Combined Services have all played on the ground throughout its history. The ground has seen one first-class match, in 1964, between the Combined Services and Cambridge University. The former cricketer Sam Pothecary spent 18 years as head groundsman at the ground.
