= Edgbaston Foundation Ground =

Sports venue in England

Coordinates: 52.48053°N 1.95342°W

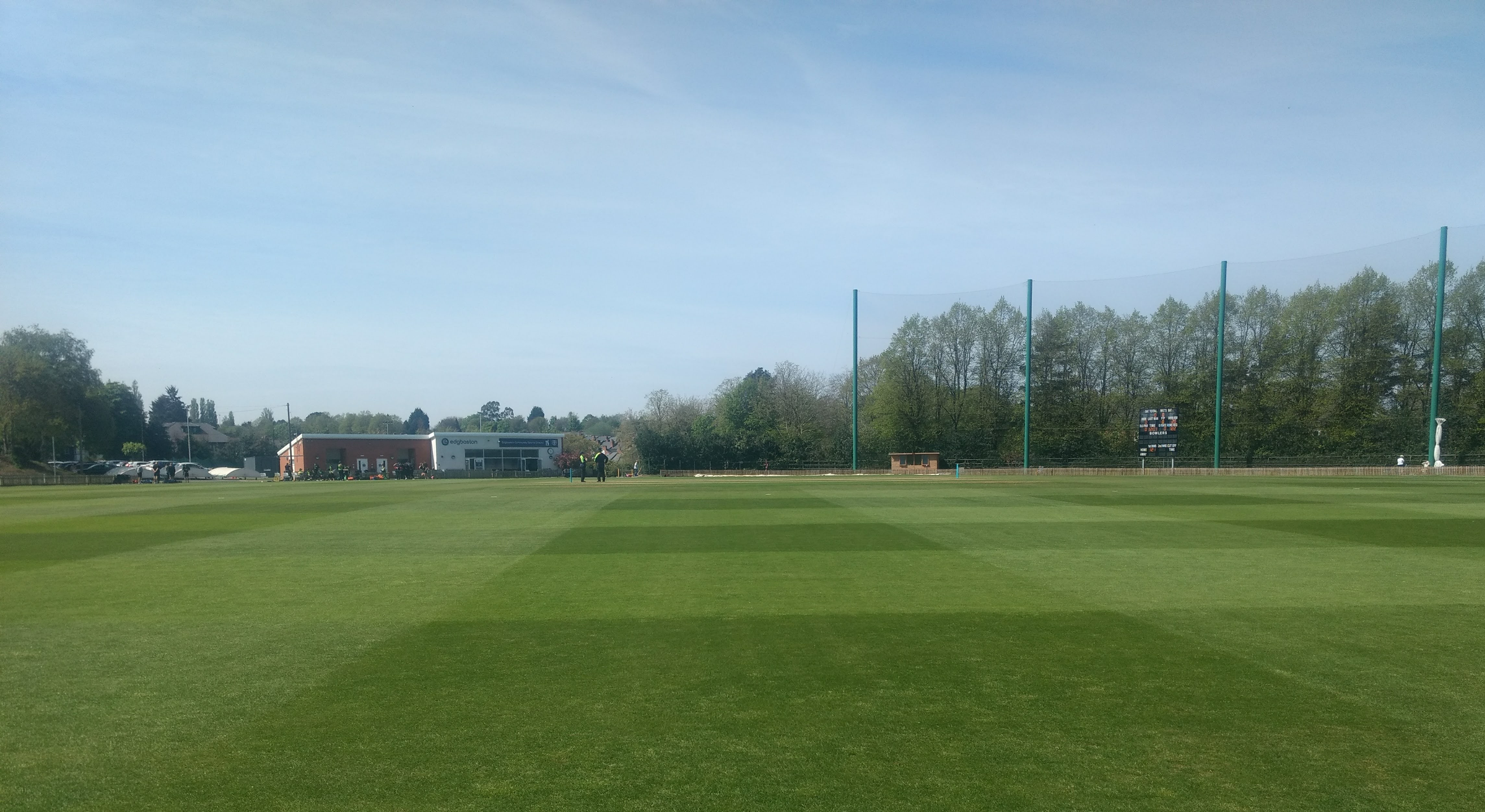
- Edgbaston Foundation Ground in 2022

Ground information
- Location: Birmingham, Warwickshire
- Establishment: 1888 (first recorded match)

Team information
Warwickshire	(1931-1939 & 1957-1961)
- As of 28 August 2010; Source: Ground profile

Edgbaston Foundation Ground, formerly Mitchells and Butlers' Ground, is a cricket ground in Birmingham, Warwickshire. The ground, near the Mitchells & Butlers brewery, was owned by Mitchells & Butlers, which had its headquarters in Birmingham. The first recorded match on the ground was in 1888, when Mitchells played Warwickshire Club and Ground. The first first-class match came in 1931 when Warwickshire played Kent. From 1931 to 1939, the ground hosted 9 first-class matches. First-class cricket returned to the ground in 1957, with Warwickshire playing 4 further first-class matches at the ground. The following season the last of which was between Warwickshire and Cambridge University.

Additionally, the ground played host to a number of matches involving the Warwickshire Second XI between 1949 and 1992. The ground has also hosted a number of ICC Trophy matches, the first of which came in the 1979 ICC Trophy between Denmark and Sri Lanka. From 1979 to 1986, the ground hosted 4 ICC Trophy matches, the last of which saw Denmark play the Netherlands in the 1986 ICC Trophy.

The final county match on the ground to date came in 1993 when the Warwickshire Second XI played the Marylebone Cricket Club Young Cricketers. Located just off Portland Road, today the ground is used as a football venue and the home of Portland Pavilion Social Club.

In late 2013, it was announced that Warwickshire County Cricket Club were in advanced talks to take control of the ground, to be used as a home for its Second XI and Youth Teams. In early November of the same year, Warwickshire's Chief Executive Colin Povey announced that the ground would be up and running for the 2015 season, with a new, smaller, pavilion, to replace that which was already at the site. It is possible that First-Class games will be played at the ground on occasion in the future, if Warwickshire's home Edgbaston is out of use, for an extended period, such as was the case for the 2013 Champions Trophy. It became the Edgbaston Foundation Sports Ground and is used by the Warwickshire CCC setup.
