= Combined Services cricket team =

British armed forces cricket team

The Combined Services cricket team represents the British Armed Forces. The team played at first-class level in England for more than 40 years in the mid-20th century. Their first first-class match was against Gentlemen of England at Lord's in 1920, while their last was against Oxford University at Aldershot in 1964. Combined Services have continued to play cricket thereafter, albeit at minor level.

== History ==
They played only six first-class matches prior to World War II, but a further 57 afterwards, when the individual services had ceased to play at first-class level (apart from two matches by the Royal Air Force immediately after the War). Of these 63 matches, they won seven (five of them between 1946 and 1949), lost 34 and drew 22.

In the 1950s, most young men had to do two years National Service in one of the armed forces, so that Combined Services was able to field some reasonably strong sides. For example, in the 1951 match against the touring South Africans the side included Brian Close, who had already played for England, and Jim Parks, Fred Titmus and Alan Moss, who would all go on to do so. In one of the later matches against Warwickshire at the Mitchells and Butlers' Ground in Birmingham, the county fast-medium bowler Jack Bannister took all 10 Services wickets in an innings for 41 runs.

The Combined Services team continues to play at sub-first-class level.

== See also ==
- Royal Navy Cricket Club
- British Army cricket team
- Royal Air Force cricket team
