= Albert Wright =

Albert Wright may refer to:

- Albert Wright (Australian cricketer) (1875–1938), Australian cricketer
- Albert Wright (cricketer, born 1899) (1899–1987), English cricketer for Northamptonshire
- Albert Wright (cricketer, born 1902) (1902–1984), English cricketer for Essex
- Albert Wright (cricketer, born 1941), English cricketer for Warwickshire
- Harry Wright (Queensland politician) (Albert Henry Wright, 1890–1963), Australian politician, MP for the Electoral district of Bulimba, Queensland (1923–1929)
- Albert D. Wright (1842–1926), American Union Army soldier and Medal of Honor recipient
- Albert Hazen Wright (1879–1970), American herpetologist
- Albert Empie Wright (1867–1945), American tennis player

== See also ==
- Chalky Wright (1912–1957), born Albert Wright, Mexican-American featherweight boxer and world champion
- Al Wright (disambiguation)
- Bert Wright (disambiguation)
- Charlie Wright (Kent cricketer) (1895–1959), English cricketer whose first forename was Albert
