= Ray Carter (cricketer) =

English cricketer (1933–2012)

Raymond George Carter (14 April 1933 – 13 November 2012) was an English cricketer who played first-class cricket for Warwickshire between 1951 and 1961. He was born in Small Heath, Birmingham, but no place of death is recorded on the main cricket websites.

Carter was a tail-end right-handed batsman and a right-arm bowler who began as a fast-medium opening bowler but who later developed a second style, bowling off-breaks. As a multi-purpose bowler, he had two good seasons with the Warwickshire first eleven in 1957 and 1958.

Carter first appeared in first-class cricket in non-County Championship matches in Warwickshire's Championship-winning season of 1951 and playing as a fast-medium opening bowler; he took four for 64 in the first innings of his first game, against Scotland. From 1952, he was on National Service and when he returned to Warwickshire in 1955, he faced competition for a fast-bowling place from other young bowlers, including Roly Thompson, Jack Bannister and Keith Dollery. He remained an irregular first-team player until the 1957 season, when his versatility won him a fairly regular place in the team, playing 23 matches, the most he managed in any single season. Wisden Cricketers' Almanack's obituary of Carter in its 2013 edition testified to the usefulness of his different bowling styles: he "took five for 56 against Nottinghamshire with his quicker stuff, then seven for 57 with off-cutters a fortnight later to set up victory over Gloucestershire at Bristol". In 1957, he took 70 wickets at the somewhat high (for the time) average of 29.15; in the wet summer of 1958, he did even better from 21 matches, taking 81 wickets at 20.01. The 1958 figures included his single most successful match, the game against Somerset in which he took six for 54 in the first innings and eight for 82 in the second; the second-innings analysis was the best of his career and the 14 wickets for 136 in the match were the only time in his first-class career that he took 10 wickets or more in a game. He was awarded his county cap for his bowling in 1958.

From 1959, however, Carter was beset by both injury and loss of form: his wickets were few in number and expensive in both the 1959 and 1961 seasons, and he was injured for much of the 1960 season with a chronic back condition. In the less than exacting context of a game against Cambridge University in 1961, he batted at No 11 and scored 37 in a last-wicket partnership with Gordon Marshall, and this was his highest first-class score. But it was the penultimate match of his first-class career and he left the Warwickshire staff at the end of the season.
