= Basil Bridge =

English cricketer (born 1938)

Personal information
- Full name: Walter Basil Bridge
- Born: 29 May 1938; Selly Oak, Birmingham
- Batting: Right-handed
- Bowling: Right-arm off-break
- Role: Bowler

Domestic team information
- Years: Team
- 1955–68: Warwickshire
- First-class debut: 24 August 1955 Warwickshire v Glamorgan
- Last First-class: 16 August 1968 Warwickshire v Scotland

Career statistics
Competition	First-class
Matches	99
Runs scored	1,058
Batting average	10.58
100s/50s	0/3
Top score	56*
Balls bowled	17,696
Wickets	283
Bowling average	26.28
5 wickets in innings	13
10 wickets in match	2
Best bowling	8/56
Catches/stumpings	59/–
- Source: CricketArchive, 14 January 2014

Walter Basil Bridge (born 29 May 1938) is a former English cricketer who played first-class cricket for Warwickshire between 1955 and 1968. He was a right-handed lower-order batsman and a right-arm off-break bowler. He was born at Selly Oak, Birmingham.

On paper, Bridge's first-class cricket career appears to have been a fairly long one; in practice, after his return from National Service he had three full seasons with mixed success from 1959 to 1961 and then a struggle with injury, illness and form that lasted for several further seasons until his last game in 1968.

Bridge made his debut at the age of 17 in a single match in 1955 and played in a few more first-team matches in 1956 before disappearing from first-class cricket for two years on National Service. He returned to Warwickshire in 1959 and after being omitted from the first team in the opening games was brought into the side before the end of May and then played regularly across the rest of the season. In June, bowling in tandem with his rival for the spinning role in the team, Geoffrey Hill, he took eight-second-innings Cambridge University wickets for 56 runs (11 for 109 in the match), and these remained the best bowling figures of his career. In the season as a whole, he took 85 wickets at an average of 22.60. Wisden Cricketers' Almanack noted "the increased usefulness of Bridge... whose ability to keep a length when under heavy fire rendered him a great asset on easy pitches".

A year later, it was a much less happy tale for Bridge in 1960 that the 1961 edition of Wisden reported: "The poor form of Bridge came as a great blow," it said. "The county have not enjoyed the services of a reliable off-spinner since the War and it had been hoped that Bridge would fill the gap in the spinning strength left vacant since the reitrement [sic] of Hollies, but he fell so far below expectations that he could not keep his place in the side." In the 1960 season, Bridge's tally of wickets fell to 34 and their cost rose to 40.47 runs per wicket.

Bridge returned to form in the 1961 season and had his best year in first-class cricket. He took 123 wickets at an average of 22.99. He was, Wisden recorded, "the first spinner in the country to take a hundred wickets". Against Glamorgan at the St Helen's cricket ground in Swansea, he took five for 48 and seven for 49 to finish with the best match figures of his career, 12 for 97, and was awarded his county cap after the game.

That, however, was almost as far as Bridge's first-class cricket career went. He was ill in 1962 and could play in no more than six matches, and though there were occasional appearances in games over the next three seasons and a final one in 1968, he bowled fewer than 400 overs after the end of the 1961 season and took only 33 further wickets.

Bridge's lower-order batting was occasionally useful in a team that was usually burdened with some genuine tail-enders: Roly Thompson, Ossie Wheatley and Albert Wright, for example. He passed 50 on three occasions in his career, with a highest score of 56 not out in the match against the 1959 Indian team, when he shared a seventh wicket partnership of 78 with Jackie Fox, whose 52 was the only half-century of his career.
