= Bert Wright =

Bert Wright may refer to:

- Bert Wright (cricketer) (1926-1994), Australian cricketer
- Bert Wright (figure skater), American ice dancer
- Bert Wright (footballer) (1920–2000), English footballer

== See also ==
- Bertie Wright (1871–1960), actor
- Bertie Wright (cricketer) (1897–1955), English cricketer
- Albert Wright (disambiguation)
- Herbert Wright (disambiguation)
- Robert Wright (disambiguation)
