= 2021 Conference USA football season =

- League: NCAA Division I Football Bowl Subdivision
- Sport: Football
- Duration: August 28, 2021 to December 23, 2021
- Teams: 14

2022 NFL Draft
- Top draft pick: DE Alex Wright, UAB
- Picked by: Cleveland Browns, 78th overall

Regular season
- East champions: Western Kentucky
- West champions: UTSA

Conference USA Championship Game
- Champions: UTSA
- Runners-up: Western Kentucky
- Finals MVP: Sincere McCormick, UTSA

Seasons
- ← 2020 2022 →

2021 Conference USA football standings
	Conf.			Overall
Team	W		L	W		L
East Division
Western Kentucky xy	7	–	1	9	–	5
Marshall	5	–	3	7	–	6
Old Dominion	5	–	3	6	–	7
Middle Tennessee	4	–	4	7	–	6
Florida Atlantic	3	–	5	5	–	7
Charlotte	3	–	5	5	–	7
FIU	0	–	8	1	–	11
West Division
UTSA xy$	7	–	1	12	–	2
UAB	6	–	2	9	–	4
North Texas	5	–	3	6	–	7
UTEP	4	–	4	7	–	6
Rice	3	–	5	4	–	8
Southern Miss	2	–	6	3	–	9
Louisiana Tech	2	–	6	3	–	9
Championship: UTSA 49, Western Kentucky 41
$ – Conference champion; x – Division champion/co-champions; y – Championship game participant

The 2021 Conference USA football season was the 26th season of college football play for Conference USA (C-USA). The season started on August 28, 2021, and ended on December 23, 2021. The conference consisted of 14 members in two divisions. It was part of the 2021 NCAA Division I FBS football season.

== Preseason ==
=== Preseason Media Poll ===
The Preseason Media Poll was released on July 19. Marshall was voted the favorite to win the East Division, while UAB was voted favorite for the West Division.

East Division (votes for 1st):
1. Marshall (17)
2. Florida Atlantic (6)
3. Western Kentucky (1)
4. Charlotte
5. Middle Tennessee
6. FIU
7. Old Dominion

West Division (votes for 1st):
1. UAB (15)
2. UTSA (9)
3. Louisiana Tech
4. Southern Miss
5. Rice
6. North Texas
7. UTEP

=== Preseason player awards ===
Preseason player awards were announced on July 20.

- Offensive Player of the Year: Sincere McCormick (Junior, UTSA runningback)
- Defensive Player of the Year: DeAngelo Malone (Senior, Western Kentucky defensive back)
- Special Teams Player of the Year: Lucas Dean (Junior, UTSA punter)

=== Preseason awards ===
The following list contains C-USA players who were included on preseason watch lists for national awards.

Award	Head coach/Player	School	Position	Link
Maxwell Award	Chris Reynolds	Charlotte	QB	
Maxwell Award	Grant Wells	Marshall	QB	
Maxwell Award	Frank Gore Jr.	Southern Miss	RB	
Maxwell Award	Sincere McCormick	UTSA	RB	
Bednarik Award	Tyler Grubbs	Louisiana Tech	LB	
Bednarik Award	Reed Blankenship	Middle Tennessee	S	
Bednarik Award	Kris Moll	UAB	LB	
Bednarik Award	Praise Amaewhule	UTEP	DE	
Bednarik Award	Rashad Wisdom	UTSA	S	
Bednarik Award	DeAngelo Malone	Western Kentucky	DE	
Davey O'Brien Award	Frank Harris	UTSA	QB	
Davey O'Brien Award	Grant Wells	Marshall	QB	
Doak Walker Award	Frank Gore Jr.	Southern Miss	RB	
Doak Walker Award	DeWayne McBride	UAB	RB	
Doak Walker Award	Sincere McCormick	UTSA	RB	
Fred Biletnikoff Award	Jacob Cowing	UTEP	WR	
Fred Biletnikoff Award	Zakhari Franklin	UTSA	WR	
Fred Biletnikoff Award	Bradley Rozner	Rice	WR	
John Mackey Award	Joshua Simon	Western Kentucky	TE	
John Mackey Award	Hayden Pittman	UAB	TE	
John Mackey Award	Leroy Watson	UTSA	TE	
Rimington Trophy	Alex Salguero	Marshall	C	
Outland Trophy	Spencer Burford	UTSA	OT	
Outland Trophy	Colby Ragland	UAB	OT	
Outland Trophy	Sidney Wells	UAB	OT	
Bronko Nagurski Trophy	Jamare Edwards	Marshall	DT	
Bronko Nagurski Trophy	Tyler Grubbs	Louisiana Tech	LB	
Bronko Nagurski Trophy	DeAngelo Malone	Western Kentucky	DE	
Bronko Nagurski Trophy	Kris Moll	UAB	LB	
Bronko Nagurski Trophy	Dion Novil	North Texas	DT	
Lou Groza Award	Jacob Barnes	Louisiana Tech	K	
Lou Groza Award	Hunter Duplessis	UTSA	K	
Lou Groza Award	Brayden Narveson	Western Kentucky	K	
Lou Groza Award	Matt Quinn	UAB	K	
Paul Hornung Award	Jacob Adams	Louisiana Tech	FB	
Paul Hornung Award	Jake Bailey	Rice	WR	
Paul Hornung Award	Jermaine Brown Jr.	UAB	RB	
Paul Hornung Award	DeAndre Torrey	North Texas	RB	
Wuerffel Trophy	Peter Agabe	Charlotte	LB	
Wuerffel Trophy	Joshua Mate	Louisiana Tech	OL	
Wuerffel Trophy	Reeves Blankenship	Louisiana Tech	LS	
Wuerffel Trophy	Alex Mollette	Marshall	OL	
Wuerffel Trophy	Reed Blankeship	Middle Tennessee	S	
Wuerffel Trophy	Jordan Young	Old Dominion	LB	
Wuerffel Trophy	Ikenna Enechukwu	Rice	DL	
Wuerffel Trophy	Colby Ragland	UAB	OL	
Wuerffel Trophy	Hunter Duplessis	UTSA	K	
Walter Camp Award	Sincere McCormick	UTSA	RB	
Manning Award	Frank Harris	UTSA	QB	
Earl Campbell Tyler Rose Award	Deion Hankins	UTEP	RB	
Earl Campbell Tyler Rose Award	Sincere McCormick	UTSA	RB	
Earl Campbell Tyler Rose Award	Jordan Myers	Rice	TE	
Earl Campbell Tyler Rose Award	Bailey Zappe	Western Kentucky	QB	
Ray Guy Award	Bernardo Rodriguez	North Texas	P	
Ray Guy Award	Cesar Barajas	Louisiana Tech	P	
Ray Guy Award	Jacob Barnes	Louisiana Tech	K	
Ray Guy Award	John Haggerty	Western Kentucky	P	
Ray Guy Award	Kyle Greenwell	UAB	P	
Ray Guy Award	Kyle Ulbrich	Middle Tennessee	P	
Ray Guy Award	Lucas Dean	UTSA	P	
Ray Guy Award	Matthew Hayball	Florida Atlantic	P	
Ray Guy Award	Tommy Heatherly	FIU	P	
Polynesian College Football Player Of The Year Award	Ahofitu Maka	UTSA	OL	
Polynesian College Football Player Of The Year Award	Manase Mose	North Texas	OL	
Johnny Unitas Golden Arm Award	Luke Anthony	Louisiana Tech	QB	
Johnny Unitas Golden Arm Award	Bailey Hockman	Middle Tennessee	QB	
Johnny Unitas Golden Arm Award	Tyler Johnston III	UAB	QB	
Johnny Unitas Golden Arm Award	Chris Reynolds	Charlotte	QB	

== Head coaches ==
Doc Holliday was released from the Head Coach position at Marshall after 11 seasons with the program. He was replaced by Charles Huff, who had previously been the running backs coach at Alabama.

Will Hall took over as the new permanent Head Coach at Southern Miss, filling the vacancy left after Jay Hopson had resigned one game into the previous season.

Note: All stats shown are before the start of the 2021 season.

Team	Head coach	Years at school	Overall record	Record at school	CUSA Record
Charlotte	Will Healy	3	22–31	9–10	7–5
FIU	Butch Davis	4	86–64	23–21	14–13
Florida Atlantic	Willie Taggart	2	61–66	5–4	4–2
Louisiana Tech	Skip Holtz	9	149–112	61–41	41–21
Marshall	Charles Huff	1	0–0	0–0	0–0
Middle Tennessee	Rick Stockstill	16	94–92	94–92	71–45
North Texas	Seth Littrell	6	31–31	31–31	21–18
Old Dominion	Ricky Rahne	2	0–0	0–0	0–0
Rice	Mike Bloomgren	4	7–23	7–23	6–15
Southern Miss	Will Hall	1	56–20	0–0	0–0
UAB	Bill Clark	6	51–26	40–22	26–10
UTEP	Dana Dimel	4	35–66	5–27	1–19
UTSA	Jeff Traylor	2	7–5	7–5	5–2
Western Kentucky	Tyson Helton	3	14–11	14–11	10–5

=== Post-season changes ===
- On November 10, Butch Davis announced that he would not return to FIU after the school declined to extend his contract.
- On November 26, Louisiana Tech announced that they were firing head coach Skip Holtz. Holtz was allowed to coach the final game of the season before being dismissed immediately after. The school announced on November 30 that Texas Tech offensive coordinator Sonny Cumbie would take over as the new head coach.

== Rankings ==
		Pre	Wk 1	Wk 2	Wk 3	Wk 4	Wk 5	Wk 6	Wk 7	Wk 8	Wk 9	Wk 10	Wk 11	Wk 12	Wk 13	Wk 14	Final
Charlotte	AP																
Charlotte	C		RV														
Charlotte	CFP	Not released															
FIU	AP																
FIU	C																
FIU	CFP	Not released															
Florida Atlantic	AP																
Florida Atlantic	C																
Florida Atlantic	CFP	Not released															
Louisiana Tech	AP															RV	
Louisiana Tech	C																
Louisiana Tech	CFP	Not released															
Marshall	AP																
Marshall	C	RV	RV	RV													
Marshall	CFP	Not released															
Middle Tennessee	AP																
Middle Tennessee	C																
Middle Tennessee	CFP	Not released															
North Texas	AP																
North Texas	C																
North Texas	CFP	Not released															
Old Dominion	AP																
Old Dominion	C																
Old Dominion	CFP	Not released															
Rice	AP																
Rice	C																
Rice	CFP	Not released															
Southern Miss	AP																
Southern Miss	C																
Southern Miss	CFP	Not released															
UAB	AP	RV	RV														RV
UAB	C	RV	RV														
UAB	CFP	Not released															
UTEP	AP																
UTEP	C																
UTEP	CFP	Not released															
UTSA	AP					RV	RV	RV	24	23	16	15	15	15	RV	24	RV
UTSA	C			RV	RV	RV	RV	RV	25	22	18	16	18	20	RV	25	RV
UTSA	CFP	Not released										23	22	22			
Western Kentucky	AP																
Western Kentucky	C																
Western Kentucky	CFP	Not released															

Legend
	Improvement in ranking
	Drop in ranking
	Not ranked previous week
	No change in ranking from previous week
RV	Received votes but were not ranked in Top 25 of poll
т	Tied with team above or below also with this symbol

== Schedule ==
Index to colors and formatting
C-USA member won
C-USA member lost
C-USA teams in **bold**

All times Eastern time.

=== Week 0 ===
Date	Time	Visiting team	Home team	Site	TV	Result	Attendance	Ref.
August 28	9:30 p.m.	**UTEP**	New Mexico State	Aggie Memorial Stadium • Las Cruces, NM (Battle of I-10)	BZAZ/FloSports	**W** 30–3	19,034	
^{#}Rankings from AP Poll released prior to game. All times are in Eastern Time.

=== Week 1 ===
Date	Time	Visiting team	Home team	Site	TV	Result	Attendance	Ref.
September 1	7:30 p.m.	**UAB**	No. 10 (FCS) Jacksonville State	Cramton Bowl • Montgomery, AL	ESPN	**W** 31–0	9,122	
September 2	7:00 p.m.	LIU	**FIU**	Riccardo Silva Stadium • Miami, FL	ESPN3	**W** 48–10		
September 2	8:00 p.m.	UT Martin	**Western Kentucky**	Houchens Industries–L. T. Smith Stadium • Bowling Green, KY	ESPN+	**W** 59–21	16,236	
September 3	7:00 p.m.	**Old Dominion**	Wake Forest	Truist Field • Winston-Salem, NC	ACCN	**L** 10–42	25,673	
September 3	7:00 p.m.	Duke	**Charlotte**	Jerry Richardson Stadium • Charlotte, NC	CBSSN	**W** 31–28	14,125	
September 4	2:00 p.m.	**Rice**	Arkansas	Donald W. Reynolds Razorback Stadium • Fayetteville, AR	ESPN+/SECN+	**L** 17–38	64,065	
September 4	3:30 p.m.	**Marshall**	Navy	Navy–Marine Corps Memorial Stadium • Annapolis, MD	CBSSN	**W** 49–7	30,131	
September 4	4:00 p.m.	**Louisiana Tech**	Mississippi State	Davis Wade Stadium • Starkville, MS	ESPNU	**L** 34–35	44,669	
September 4	7:00 p.m.	No. 13 (FCS) Monmouth	**Middle Tennessee**	Johnny "Red" Floyd Stadium • Murfreesboro, TN	ESPN3	**W** 50–15	15,017	
September 4	7:30 p.m.	**Florida Atlantic**	No. 13 Florida	Ben Hill Griffin Stadium • Gainesville, FL	SECN	**L** 14–35	86,840	
September 4	7:30 p.m.	Northwestern State	**North Texas**	Apogee Stadium • Denton, TX	ESPN3	**W** 44–14	18,716	
September 4	7:30 p.m.	**UTSA**	Illinois	Memorial Stadium • Champaign, IL	BTN	**W** 37–30	33,906	
September 4	8:00 p.m.	**Southern Miss**	South Alabama	Hancock Whitney Stadium • Mobile, AL	ESPN+	**L** 7–31	20,156	
September 4	9:00 p.m.	Bethune–Cookman	**UTEP**	Sun Bowl • El Paso, TX	ESPN3	**W** 38–28	14,554	
^{#}Rankings from AP Poll released prior to game. All times are in Eastern Time.

=== Week 2 ===
Date	Time	Visiting team	Home team	Site	TV	Result	Attendance	Ref.
September 10	9:30 p.m.	**UTEP**	Boise State	Albertsons Stadium • Boise, ID	FS1	**L** 13–54	35,518	
September 11	11:30 a.m.	**Western Kentucky**	Army	Michie Stadium • West Point, NY	CBSSN	**L** 35–38	25,989	
September 11	2:00 p.m.	**Middle Tennessee**	No. 19 Virginia Tech	Lane Stadium • Blacksburg, VA	ACCNX	**L** 14–35	53,680	
September 11	3:30 p.m.	**UAB**	No. 2 Georgia	Sanford Stadium • Athens, GA	ESPN2	**L** 7–56	92,746	
September 11	3:30 p.m.	Georgia Southern	**Florida Atlantic**	FAU Stadium • Boca Raton, FL	Stadium	**W** 38–6	17,736	
September 11	6:00 p.m.	Gardner–Webb	**Charlotte**	Jerry Richardson Stadium • Charlotte, NC	ESPN3	**W** 38–10	12,274	
September 11	6:00 p.m.	Lamar	**UTSA**	Alamodome • San Antonio, TX	ESPN+	**W** 54–0	16,229	
September 11	6:30 p.m.	Houston	**Rice**	Rice Stadium • Houston, TX (rivalry)	CBSSN	**L** 7–44	26,253	
September 11	6:30 p.m.	North Carolina Central	**Marshall**	Joan C. Edwards Stadium • Huntington, WV	ESPN+	**W** 44–10	24,521	
September 11	7:00 p.m.	**North Texas**	SMU	Gerald J. Ford Stadium • Dallas, TX (Safeway Bowl)	ESPN+	**L** 12–35	29,121	
September 11	7:00 p.m.	No. 13 (FCS) Southeastern Louisiana	**Louisiana Tech**	Joe Aillet Stadium • Ruston, LA	ESPN3	**W** 45–42	15,328	
September 11	7:00 p.m.	Texas State	**FIU**	Riccardo Silva Stadium • Miami, FL	ESPN+	**L** 17–23 ^{OT}		
September 11	7:00 p.m.	Hampton	**Old Dominion**	S.B. Ballard Stadium • Norfolk, VA	ESPN3	**W** 47–7	18,363	
September 11	7:00 p.m.	Grambling State	**Southern Miss**	M. M. Roberts Stadium • Hattiesburg, MS	ESPN3	**W** 37–0	25,235	
^{#}Rankings from AP Poll released prior to game. All times are in Eastern Time.

=== Week 3 ===
Date	Time	Visiting team	Home team	Site	TV	Result	Attendance	Ref.
September 18	3:30 p.m.	SMU	**Louisiana Tech**	Joe Aillet Stadium • Ruston, LA	CBSSN	**L** 37–39	15,329	
September 18	6:00 p.m.	East Carolina	**Marshall**	Joan C. Edwards Stadium • Huntington, WV (rivalry)	Facebook	**L** 38–42	24,833	
September 18	6:00 p.m.	Fordham	**Florida Atlantic**	FAU Stadium • Boca Raton, FL	ESPN3	**W** 45–14	17,132	
September 18	6:00 p.m.	**Old Dominion**	Liberty	Williams Stadium • Lynchburg, VA	ESPN3	**L** 17–45	18,471	
September 18	6:00 p.m.	**Middle Tennessee**	**UTSA**	Alamodome • San Antonio, Texas	ESPN+	**UTSA** 27–13	16,202	
September 18	7:00 p.m.	**Charlotte**	Georgia State	Center Parc Stadium • Atlanta, GA	ESPN+	**L** 9–20	12,978	
September 18	7:00 p.m.	**FIU**	Texas Tech	Jones AT&T Stadium • Lubbock, TX	ESPN+	**L** 21–54	50,118	
September 18	7:00 p.m.	Troy	**Southern Miss**	M. M. Roberts Stadium • Hattiesburg, Mississippi	ESPN+	**L** 9–21	24,242	
September 18	7:30 p.m.	**UAB**	**North Texas**	Apogee Stadium • Denton, TX	Stadium	**UAB** 40–6	17,731	
September 18	8:00 p.m.	**Rice**	Texas	Darrell K Royal–Texas Memorial Stadium • Austin, TX (rivalry)	LHN	**L** 0–58	91,978	
^{#}Rankings from AP Poll released prior to game. All times are in Eastern Time.

=== Week 4 ===
Date	Time	Visiting team	Home team	Site	TV	Result	Attendance	Ref.
September 23	7:30 p.m.	**Marshall**	Appalachian State	Kidd Brewer Stadium • Boone, NC	ESPN	**L** 30–31	28,377	
September 24	6:30 p.m.	**Middle Tennessee**	**Charlotte**	Jerry Richardson Stadium • Charlotte, NC	CBSSN	**CHAR** 42–39	11,076	
September 25	12:00 p.m.	**FIU**	Central Michigan	Kelly/Shorts Stadium • Mount Pleasant, MI	ESPN+	**L** 27–31	30,255	
September 25	3:30 p.m.	**UTSA**	Memphis	Liberty Bowl Memorial Stadium • Memphis, TN	ESPNU	**W** 31–28	29,264	
September 25	6:00 p.m.	Buffalo	**Old Dominion**	S.B. Ballard Stadium • Norfolk, VA	ESPN+	**L** 34–35		
September 25	6:30 p.m.	Texas Southern	**Rice**	Rice Stadium • Houston, TX	ESPN3	**W** 48–34	18,326	
September 25	7:00 p.m.	**North Texas**	**Louisiana Tech**	Joe Aillet Stadium • Ruston, LA	Stadium	**LT** 24–17	15,488	
September 25	7:30 p.m.	**Southern Miss**	No. 1 Alabama	Bryant–Denny Stadium • Tuscaloosa, AL	SECN	**L** 14–63	100,077	
September 25	8:00 p.m.	**Florida Atlantic**	Air Force	Falcon Stadium • Colorado Springs, CO	FS2	**L** 7–31	19,763	
September 25	8:00 p.m.	**UAB**	Tulane	Yulman Stadium • New Orleans, LA	ESPN+	**W** 28–21	16,023	
September 25	8:00 p.m.	Indiana	**Western Kentucky**	Houchens Industries–L. T. Smith Stadium • Bowling Green, KY	CBSSN	**L** 31–33	25,171	
September 25	9:00 p.m.	New Mexico	**UTEP**	Sun Bowl • El Paso, TX	ESPN+	**W** 20–13	15,069	
^{#}Rankings from AP Poll released prior to game. All times are in Eastern Time.

=== Week 5 ===
Date	Time	Visiting team	Home team	Site	TV	Result	Attendance	Ref.
October 2	12:00 p.m.	**Charlotte**	Illinois	Memorial Stadium • Champaign, IL	BTN	**L** 14–24	30,559	
October 2	3:30 p.m.	**FIU**	**Florida Atlantic**	FAU Stadium • Boca Raton, FL (Shula Bowl)	Stadium	**FAU** 58–21	24,726	
October 2	6:00 p.m.	**Louisiana Tech**	No. 23 NC State	Carter–Finley Stadium • Raleigh, NC	ACCN/ESPN+	**L** 27–34	51,064	
October 2	6:00 p.m.	UNLV	**UTSA**	Alamodome • San Antonio, TX	ESPN+	**W** 24–17	20,154	
October 2	6:30 p.m.	**Southern Miss**	**Rice**	Rice Stadium • Houston, TX	ESPN3	**RICE** 24–19	16,031	
October 2	7:00 p.m.	Liberty	**UAB**	Protective Stadium • Birmingham, AL	CBSSN	**L** 12–36	37,167	
October 2	7:00 p.m.	**Marshall**	**Middle Tennessee**	Johnny "Red" Floyd Stadium • Murfreesboro, TN	Stadium	**MTSU** 34–28	15,806	
October 2	7:30 p.m.	**Western Kentucky**	No. 17 Michigan State	Spartan Stadium • East Lansing, MI	BTN	**L** 31–48	70,075	
October 2	9:00 p.m.	**Old Dominion**	**UTEP**	Sun Bowl • El Paso, TX	ESPN+	**UTEP** 28–21	11,025	
^{#}Rankings from AP Poll released prior to game. All times are in Eastern Time.

=== Week 6 ===
Date	Time	Visiting team	Home team	Site	TV	Result	Attendance	Ref.
October 8	7:00 p.m.	Charlotte	**FIU**	Riccardo Silva Stadium • Miami, FL	CBSSN	**CHAR** 45–33		
October 9	2:00 p.m.	Old Dominion	**Marshall**	Joan C. Edwards Stadium • Huntington, WV	Facebook	**MU** 20–13 ^{OT}	24,172	
October 9	3:30 p.m.	Florida Atlantic	**UAB**	Protective Stadium • Birmingham, AL	Stadium	**UAB** 31–14	25,191	
October 9	3:30 p.m.	Middle Tennessee	Liberty	Williams Stadium • Lynchburg, VA	ESPN3	**L** 13–41	19,935	
October 9	4:00 p.m.	North Texas	Missouri	Faurot Field • Columbia, MO	SECN	**L** 35–48	46,985	
October 9	7:00 p.m.	UTEP	**Southern Miss**	M. M. Roberts Stadium • Hattiesburg, MS	ESPN3	**UTEP** 26–13	26,049	
October 9	7:00 p.m.	UTSA	**Western Kentucky**	Houchens Industries–L. T. Smith Stadium • Bowling Green, KY	Stadium	**UTSA** 52–46	15,243	
^{#}Rankings from AP Poll released prior to game. All times are in Eastern Time.

=== Week 7 ===
Date	Time	Visiting team	Home team	Site	TV	Result	Attendance	Ref.
October 15	7:00 p.m.	**Marshall**	**North Texas**	Apogee Stadium • Denton, TX	CBSSN	**MU** 49–21	13,123	
October 16	3:30 p.m.	**UAB**	**Southern Miss**	M. M. Roberts Stadium • Hattiesburg, MS	Stadium	**UAB** 34–0	21,514	
October 16	3:30 p.m.	**Western Kentucky**	**Old Dominion**	S.B. Ballard Stadium • Norfolk, VA	ESPN3	**WKU** 43–20	16,418	
October 16	6:00 p.m.	**Rice**	**UTSA**	Alamodome • San Antonio, TX	ESPN+	**UTSA** 45–0	27,515	
October 16	9:00 p.m.	**Louisiana Tech**	**UTEP**	Sun Bowl • El Paso, TX	ESPN+	**UTEP** 19–3	18,468	
^{#}Rankings from AP Poll released prior to game. All times are in Eastern Time.

=== Week 8 ===
Date	Time	Visiting team	Home team	Site	TV	Result	Attendance	Ref.
October 21	7:30 p.m.	**Florida Atlantic**	**Charlotte**	Jerry Richardson Stadium • Charlotte, NC	CBSSN	**FAU** 38–9	13,017	
October 22	6:00 p.m.	**Middle Tennessee**	UConn	Rentschler Field • East Hartford, CT	CBSSN	**W** 44–13	10,698	
October 23	3:30 p.m.	**Rice**	**UAB**	Protective Stadium • Birmingham, AL	ESPN+	**RICE** 30–24	24,845	
October 23	4:00 p.m.	Liberty	**North Texas**	Apogee Stadium • Denton, TX	ESPN+	**L** 26–35	13,454	
October 23	7:00 p.m.	No. 24 **UTSA**	**Louisiana Tech**	Joe Aillet Stadium • Ruston, LA	Stadium	**UTSA** 45–16	18,314	
October 23	7:00 p.m.	**Western Kentucky**	**FIU**	Riccardo Silva Stadium • Miami, Florida	ESPN+	**WKU** 34–19		
^{#}Rankings from AP Poll released prior to game. All times are in Eastern Time.

=== Week 9 ===
Date	Time	Visiting team	Home team	Site	TV	Result	Attendance	Ref.
October 30	2:00 p.m.	North Texas	Rice	Rice Stadium • Houston, TX	ESPN3	**UNT** 30–24 ^{OT}	17,354	
October 30	3:30 p.m.	FIU	Marshall	Joan C. Edwards Stadium • Huntington, WV	Stadium	**MU** 38–0	18,466	
October 30	3:30 p.m.	Louisiana Tech	Old Dominion	S.B. Ballard Stadium • Norfolk, VA	CBSSN	**ODU** 23–20	13,309	
October 30	3:30 p.m.	Southern Miss	Middle Tennessee	Johnny "Red" Floyd Stadium • Murfreesboro, TN	ESPN+	**MTSU** 35–10	10,721	
October 30	4:00 p.m.	Charlotte	Western Kentucky	Houchens Industries–L. T. Smith Stadium • Bowling Green, KY	ESPN+	**WKU** 45–13	16,763	
October 30	6:00 p.m.	UTEP	Florida Atlantic	FAU Stadium • Boca Raton, FL	ESPN+	**FAU** 28–25	16,432	
^{#}Rankings from AP Poll released prior to game. All times are in Eastern Time.

=== Week 10 ===
Date	Time	Visiting team	Home team	Site	TV	Result	Attendance	Ref.
November 6	12:00 p.m.	**Louisiana Tech**	UAB	Protective Stadium • Birmingham, AL	CBSSN	**UAB** 52–38	21,261	
November 6	3:00 p.m.	**North Texas**	Southern Miss	M. M. Roberts Stadium • Hattiesburg, MS	ESPN+	**UNT** 38–14	22,478	
November 6	3:30 p.m.	**Middle Tennessee**	Western Kentucky	Houchens Industries–L. T. Smith Stadium • Bowling Green, KY (100 Miles of Hate)	Stadium	**WKU** 48–21	15,022	
November 6	3:30 p.m.	**Rice**	Charlotte	Jerry Richardson Stadium • Charlotte, NC	ESPN+	**CHAR** 31–24 ^{OT}	16,050	
November 6	6:00 p.m.	**Marshall**	Florida Atlantic	FAU Stadium • Boca Raton, FL	Facebook	**MU** 28–13	21,803	
November 6	7:00 p.m.	**Old Dominion**	FIU	Riccardo Silva Stadium • Miami, FL	ESPN3	**ODU** 47–24	0	
November 6	10:15 p.m.	No. 16 **UTSA**	UTEP	Sun Bowl • El Paso, TX	ESPN2	**UTSA** 44–23	31,658	
^{#}Rankings from AP Poll released prior to game. All times are in Eastern Time.

=== Week 11 ===
Date	Time	Visiting team	Home team	Site	TV	Result	Attendance	Ref.
November 13	2:00 p.m.	Western Kentucky	**Rice**	Rice Stadium • Houston, TX	ESPN+	**WKU** 42–21	17,883	
November 13	3:30 p.m.	Charlotte	**Louisiana Tech**	Joe Aillet Stadium • Ruston, LA	Stadium	**LT** 42–32	14,068	
November 13	3:30 p.m.	FIU	**Middle Tennessee**	Johnny "Red" Floyd Stadium • Murfreesboro, TN	ESPN3	**MTSU** 50–10	10,606	
November 13	3:30 p.m.	Florida Atlantic	**Old Dominion**	S.B. Ballard Stadium • Norfolk, VA	ESPN+	**ODU** 30–16	13,634	
November 13	3:30 p.m.	Southern Miss	No. 15 **UTSA**	Alamodome • San Antonio, TX	ESPN+	**UTSA** 27–17	30,105	
November 13	3:30 p.m.	UAB	**Marshall**	Joan C. Edwards Stadium • Huntington, WV	CBSSN	**UAB** 21–14	19,329	
November 13	4:00 p.m.	UTEP	**North Texas**	Apogee Stadium • Denton, TX	ESPN+	**UNT** 20–17	20,056	
^{#}Rankings from AP Poll released prior to game. All times are in Eastern Time.

=== Week 12 ===
Date	Time	Visiting team	Home team	Site	TV	Result	Attendance	Ref.
November 19	8:00 p.m.	Southern Miss	**Louisiana Tech**	Joe Aillet Stadium • Ruston, LA (Rivalry in Dixie)	CBSSN	**USM** 35–19	10,410	
November 20	12:00 p.m.	Florida Atlantic	**Western Kentucky**	Houchens Industries–L. T. Smith Stadium • Bowling Green, KY	Stadium	**WKU** 52–17	10,477	
November 20	3:30 p.m.	Marshall	**Charlotte**	Jerry Richardson Stadium • Charlotte, NC	Stadium	**MU** 49–28	13,211	
November 20	3:30 p.m.	Old Dominion	**Middle Tennessee**	Johnny "Red" Floyd Stadium • Murfreesboro, TN	ESPN+	**ODU** 24–17	9,606	
November 20	3:30 p.m.	UAB	No. 15 **UTSA**	Alamodome • San Antonio, TX	ESPN+	**UTSA** 34–31	35,147	
November 20	4:00 p.m.	Rice	**UTEP**	Sun Bowl • El Paso, TX	ESPN+	**UTEP** 38–28	10,097	
November 20	7:00 p.m.	North Texas	**FIU**	Riccardo Silva Stadium • Miami, FL	ESPN3	**UNT** 49–7		
^{#}Rankings from AP Poll released prior to game. All times are in Eastern Time.

=== Week 13 ===
Date	Time	Visiting team	Home team	Site	TV	Result	Attendance	Ref.
November 26	2:00 p.m.	**UTEP**	UAB	Protective Stadium • Birmingham, AL	ESPN+	**UAB** 42–25	19,683	
November 27	1:00 p.m.	**Louisiana Tech**	Rice	Rice Stadium • Houston, TX	ESPN+	**RICE** 35–31		
November 27	2:00 p.m.	**Charlotte**	Old Dominion	S.B. Ballard Stadium • Norfolk, VA	ESPN+	**ODU** 56–34	15,874	
November 27	2:00 p.m.	No. 15 **UTSA**	North Texas	Apogee Stadium • Denton, TX	ESPN+	**UNT** 45–23	16,933	
November 27	3:00 p.m.	**FIU**	Southern Miss	M. M. Roberts Stadium • Hattiesburg, MS	ESPN+	**USM** 37–17	20,041	
November 27	3:30 p.m.	**Western Kentucky**	Marshall	Joan C. Edwards Stadium • Huntington, WV	CBSSN	**WKU** 53–21	19,134	
November 27	7:00 p.m.	**Middle Tennessee**	Florida Atlantic	FAU Stadium • Boca Raton, FL	Stadium	**MTSU** 27–17	15,127	
^{#}Rankings from AP Poll released prior to game. All times are in Eastern Time.

=== Conference USA Championship Game ===
Date	Time	Visiting team	Home team	Site	TV	Result	Attendance	Ref.
December 3	7:00 p.m.	**Western Kentucky**	**UTSA**	Alamodome • San Antonio, TX	CBSSN	**UTSA** 49–41	41,148	
^{#}Rankings from AP Poll released prior to game. All times are in Eastern Time.

== Postseason ==
=== Bowl Games ===
Legend
C-USA Win
C-USA Loss

Bowl game	Date	Site	Television	Time (EST)	C-USA team	Opponent	Score	Attendance
Bahamas Bowl	December 17	Thomas Robinson Stadium • Nassau, Bahamas	ESPN	12:00 p.m.	Middle Tennessee	Toledo	W 31–24	13,596
Boca Raton Bowl	December 18	FAU Stadium • Boca Raton, FL	ESPN	11:00 a.m.	Western Kentucky	Appalachian State	W 59–38	15,429
New Mexico Bowl	December 18	University Stadium • Albuquerque, NM	ESPN	2:15 p.m.	UTEP	Fresno State	L 24–31	16,422
Independence Bowl	December 18	Independence Stadium • Shreveport, LA	ABC	3:30 p.m.	UAB	No. 13 BYU	W 31–28	26,276
New Orleans Bowl	December 18	Caesars Superdome • New Orleans, LA	ESPN	9:15 p.m.	Marshall	No. 23 Louisiana	L 21–36	21,642
Myrtle Beach Bowl	December 20	Brooks Stadium • Conway, SC	ESPN	2:30 p.m.	Old Dominion	Tulsa	L 17–30	6,557
Frisco Bowl	December 21	Toyota Stadium • Frisco, TX	ESPN	7:30 p.m.	UTSA	San Diego State	L 24–38	15,801
Frisco Football Classic	December 23	Toyota Stadium • Frisco, TX	ESPN	3:30 p.m.	North Texas	Miami (OH)	L 14–27	11,721

== Conference USA records vs other conferences ==
2021–2022 records against non-conference foes:

Power Conferences 5	Record
ACC	1–3
Big Ten	1–3
Big 12	0–2
Pac-12	0–0
BYU/Notre Dame	0–0
SEC	0–6
Power 5 Total	2–14
Other FBS Conferences	Record
American	3–4
Independents (Excluding Notre Dame and BYU)	2–5
MAC	0–2
Mountain West	2–2
Sun Belt	1–5
Other FBS Total	8–18
FCS Opponents	Record
Football Championship Subdivision	14–0
Total Non-Conference Record	24–32

=== Conference USA vs Power 5 matchups ===
This is a list of games C-USA has scheduled versus power conference teams (ACC, Big 10, Big 12, Pac-12, BYU, Notre Dame and SEC). All rankings are from the current AP Poll at the time of the game.

Date	Conference	Visitor	Home	Site	Score
September 3	ACC	Old Dominion	Wake Forest	Truist Field • Winston-Salem, NC	L 10–42
September 3	ACC	Duke	Charlotte	Jerry Richardson Stadium • Charlotte, NC	W 31–28
September 4	SEC	Rice	Arkansas	Donald W. Reynolds Razorback Stadium • Fayetteville, AR	L 17–38
September 4	SEC	Louisiana Tech	Mississippi State	Davis Wade Stadium • Starkville, MS	L 34–35
September 4	SEC	Florida Atlantic	No. 13 Florida	Ben Hill Griffin Stadium • Gainesville, FL	L 14–35
September 4	Big Ten	UTSA	Illinois	Memorial Stadium • Champaign, IL	W 37–30
September 11	ACC	Middle Tennessee	No. 19 Virginia Tech	Lane Stadium • Blacksburg, VA	L 14–35
September 11	SEC	UAB	No. 2 Georgia	Sanford Stadium • Athens, GA	L 7–56
September 18	Big 12	FIU	Texas Tech	Jones AT&T Stadium • Lubbock, TX	L 21–54
September 18	Big 12	Rice	Texas	Darrell K Royal–Texas Memorial Stadium • Austin, TX	L 0–58
September 25	Big Ten	Indiana	Western Kentucky	Houchens Industries–L. T. Smith Stadium • Bowling Green, KY	L 31–33
September 25	SEC	Southern Miss	No. 1 Alabama	Bryant–Denny Stadium • Tuscaloosa, AL	L 14–63
October 2	Big Ten	Western Kentucky	No. 17 Michigan State	Spartan Stadium • East Lansing, MI	L 31–48
October 2	ACC	Louisiana Tech	No. 23 NC State	Carter–Finley Stadium • Raleigh, NC	L 27–34
October 2	Big Ten	Charlotte	Illinois	Memorial Stadium • Champaign, IL	L 14–24
October 9	SEC	North Texas	Missouri	Farout Field • Columbia, MO	L 35–48

=== Conference USA vs Group of Five matchups ===
The following games include C-USA teams competing against teams from the American, MAC, Mountain West, or Sun Belt.

Date	Conference	Visitor	Home	Site	Score
September 4	American	Marshall	Navy	Navy–Marine Corps Memorial Stadium • Annapolis, MD	W 49–7
September 4	Sun Belt	Southern Miss	South Alabama	Hancock Whitney Stadium • Mobile, AL	L 7–31
September 10	Mountain West	UTEP	Boise State	Albertsons Stadium • Boise, ID	L 13–54
September 11	Sun Belt	Georgia Southern	Florida Atlantic	FAU Stadium • Boca Raton, FL	W 38–6
September 11	American	Houston	Rice	Rice Stadium • Houston, TX	L 7–44
September 11	American	North Texas	SMU	Gerald J. Ford Stadium • Dallas, TX	L 12–35
September 11	Sun Belt	Texas State	FIU	Riccardo Silva Stadium • Miami, FL	L 17–23 ^{OT}
September 18	American	SMU	Louisiana Tech	Joe Aillet Stadium • Ruston, LA	L 37–39
September 18	American	East Carolina	Marshall	Joan C. Edwards Stadium • Huntington, WV	L 38–42
September 18	Sun Belt	Charlotte	Georgia State	Center Parc Stadium • Atlanta, GA	L 9–20
September 18	Sun Belt	Troy	Southern Miss	M. M. Roberts Stadium • Hattiesburg, MS	L 9–21
September 23	Sun Belt	Marshall	Appalachian State	Kidd Brewer Stadium • Boone, NC	L 30–31
September 25	MAC	Buffalo	Old Dominion	S.B. Ballard Stadium • Norfolk, VA	L 34–35
September 25	Mountain West	New Mexico	UTEP	Sun Bowl • El Paso, TX	W 20–13
September 25	MAC	FIU	Central Michigan	Kelly/Shorts Stadium • Mount Pleasant, MI	L 27–31
September 25	American	UAB	Tulane	Yulman Stadium • New Orleans, LA	W 28–21
September 25	American	UTSA	Memphis	Liberty Bowl Memorial Stadium • Memphis, TN	W 31–28
September 25	Mountain West	Florida Atlantic	Air Force	Falcon Stadium • Colorado Spring, CO	L 7–31
October 2	Mountain West	UNLV	UTSA	Alamodome • San Antonio, TX	W 24–17

=== Conference USA vs FBS independents matchups ===
The following games include C-USA teams competing against FBS Independents, which includes Army, Liberty, New Mexico State, UConn, or UMass.

Date	Conference	Visitor	Home	Site	Score
August 28	Independent	UTEP	New Mexico State	Aggie Memorial Stadium • Las Cruces, NM	W 30–3
September 11	Independent	Western Kentucky	Army	Michie Stadium • West Point, NY	L 35–38
September 18	Independent	Old Dominion	Liberty	Williams Stadium • Lynchburg, VA	L 17–45
October 2	Independent	Liberty	UAB	Protective Stadium • Birmingham, AL	L 12–36
October 9	Independent	Middle Tennessee	Liberty	Williams Stadium • Lynchburg, VA	L 13–41
October 22	Independent	Middle Tennessee	UConn	Rentschler Field • East Hartford, CT	W 44–13
October 23	Independent	Liberty	North Texas	Apogee Stadium • Denton, TX	L 26–35

=== Conference USA vs FCS matchups ===
Date	Visitor	Home	Site	Score
September 1	UAB	Jacksonville State	Cramton Bowl • Montgomery, AL	W 31–0
September 2	LIU	FIU	Riccardo Silva Stadium • Miami, FL	W 48–10
September 2	UT Martin	Western Kentucky	Houchens Industries–L. T. Smith Stadium • Bowling Green, KY	W 59–21
September 4	Monmouth	Middle Tennessee	Johnny "Red" Floyd Stadium • Murfreesboro, TN	W 50–15
September 4	Northwestern State	North Texas	Apogee Stadium • Denton, TX	W 44–14
September 4	Bethune–Cookman	UTEP	Sun Bowl • El Paso, TX	W 38–28
September 11	Gardner–Webb	Charlotte	Jerry Richardson Stadium • Charlotte, NC	W 38–10
September 11	Lamar	UTSA	Alamodome • San Antonio, TX	W 54–0
September 11	North Carolina Central	Marshall	Joan C. Edwards Stadium • Huntington, WV	W 44–10
September 11	Southeastern Louisiana	Louisiana Tech	Joe Aillet Stadium • Ruston, LA	W 45–42
September 11	Hampton	Old Dominion	S.B. Ballard Stadium • Norfolk, VA	W 47–7
September 11	Grambling State	Southern Miss	M. M. Roberts Stadium • Hattiesburg, MS	W 37–0
September 18	Fordham	Florida Atlantic	FAU Stadium • Boca Raton, FL	W 45–14
September 25	Texas Southern	Rice	Rice Stadium • Houston, TX	W 48–34

== Awards and honors ==
=== Player of the week honors ===
Week	Offensive			Defensive			Special Teams		
Week	Player	Team	Position	Player	Team	Position	Player	Team	Position
Week 0 (August 30)	Jacob Cowing	UTEP	WR	Dy'Vonne Inyang	UTEP	S	Gavin Baechle	UTEP	K
Week 1 (September 6)	Chris Reynolds	Charlotte	QB	Eli Neal	Marshall	LB	Hunter Duplessis	UTSA	K
Week 2 (September 13)	Bailey Zappe; N'Kosi Perry	Western Kentucky; Florida Atlantic	QB; QB	BeeJay Williamson	Louisiana Tech	DB	Sheldon Jones	UTSA	PR
Week 3 (September 20)	Gerrit Prince	UAB	TE	Trumane Bell II	UTSA	DL	Kyle Greenwell	UAB	P
Week 4 (September 27)	Chris Reynolds (2)	Charlotte	QB	Clarence Hicks; A.J. Brathwaite	UTSA; Western Kentucky	LB; S	Hunter Duplessis (2)	UTSA	K
Week 5 (October 4)	Bailey Zappe (2)	Western Kentucky	QB	Reed Blankenship	Middle Tennessee	S	Cameron Harrell	Southern Miss	KR
Week 6 (October 11)	Frank Harris	UTSA	QB	Alex Wright	UAB	DE	Shadrick Byrd	Charlotte	KR
Week 7 (October 18)	Jerreth Sterns	Western Kentucky	WR	Jadrian Taylor	UTEP	DE	Grayson Cash	UAB	S
Week 8 (October 25)	Wiley Green	Rice	QB	Gabe Taylor	Rice	S	Brayden Narveson	Western Kentucky	K
Week 9 (November 1)	Bailey Zappe (3)	Western Kentucky	QB	DQ Thomas	Middle Tennessee	LB	Nick Rice	Old Dominion	K
Week 10 (November 8)	DeWayne McBride	UAB	RB	Beanie Bishop	Western Kentucky	DB	Jayden Harrison	Marshall	KR
Week 11 (November 15)	Bailey Zappe (4)	Western Kentucky	QB	Jason Henderson	Old Dominion	LB	R'Tarriun Johnson	Old Dominion	S
Week 12 (November 22)	Frank Harris (2)	UTSA	QB	Clarence Hicks (2)	UTSA	LB	Hunter Duplessis (3)	UTSA	K
Week 13 (November 29)	Ali Jennings	Old Dominion	WR	DeAngelo Malone	Western Kentucky	DE	Brayden Narveson (2)	Western Kentucky	K

=== Conference USA Individual Awards ===
The following individuals received postseason honors as voted by the Conference USA football coaches at the end of the season.

Award	Player	School
Player of the Year	Bailey Zappe, QB, Grad.	Western Kentucky
Offensive Player of the Year	Sincere McCormick, RB, So.	UTSA
Defensive Player of the Year	DeAngelo Malone, DE Sr.	Western Kentucky
Special Teams Player of the Year	Tommy Heatherly, P Sr.	FIU
Freshman Player of the Year	Elijah Spencer, WR	Charlotte
Newcomer of the Year	Jerreth Sterns, WR Jr.	Western Kentucky
Coach of the Year	Jeff Traylor	UTSA

=== All-Conference Teams ===
The following players were selected as part of the Conference USA's All-Conference Teams.

Position	Player	Team
First Team Offense
WR	Jerreth Sterns	Western Kentucky
WR	Jacob Cowing	UTEP
WR	Zakhari Franklin	UTSA
OL	Alex Mollette	Marshall
OL	Cole Spencer	Western Kentucky
OL	Spencer Burford	UTSA
OL	Colby Ragland	UAB
OL	Mason Brooks	Western Kentucky
TE	Zack Kuntz	Old Dominion
QB	Bailey Zappe	Western Kentucky
RB	Sincere McCormick	UTSA
RB	Rasheen Ali	Marshall
First Team Defense
DE	Praise Amaewhule	UTEP
DL	Elijah Garcia	Rice
DL	Tyree Turner	UAB
DE	DeAngelo Malone	Western Kentucky
LB	KD Davis	North Texas
LB	Abraham Beauplan	Marshall
LB	Clarence Hicks	UTSA
DB	Reed Blankenship	Middle Tennessee
DB	Rashad Wisdom	UTSA
DB	Beanie Bishop	Western Kentucky
DB	Quincy Riley	Middle Tennessee
First Team Special Teams
K	Hunter Duplessis	UTSA
P	Tommy Heatherly	FIU
LS	Reeves Blankenship	Louisiana Tech
KR	Cameron Harrell	Southern Miss
PR	Jaylin Lane	Middle Tennessee

Position	Player	Team
Second Team Offense
WR	Mitchell Tinsley	Western Kentucky
WR	Jason Brownlee	Southern Miss
WR	Tyrese Chambers	FIU
OL	Will Ulmer	Marshall
OL	Quantavious Leslie	Western Kentucky
OL	Ahofitu Maka	UTSA
OL	Manase Mose	North Texas
OL	Boe Wilson	Western Kentucky
TE	Gerrit Prince	UAB
QB	Frank Harris	UTSA
RB	DeWayne McBride	UAB
RB	DeAndre Torrey	North Texas
Second Team Defense
DE	Jordan Ferguson	Middle Tennessee
DL	Dion Novil	North Texas
DL	Jaylon Haynes	UTSA
DE	Alex Wright	UAB
LB	Breon Hayward	UTEP
LB	Tyler Grubbs	Louisiana Tech
LB	DQ Thomas	Middle Tennessee
DB	Steven Gilmore	Marshall
DB	Micah Abraham	Marshall
DB	Grayson Cash	UAB
DB	Richard Dames	FIU
Second Team Special Teams
K	Brayden Narveson	Western Kentucky
P	Lucas Dean	UTSA
LS	Caleb Cantrell	UTSA
KR	Jayden Harrison	Marshall
PR	Smoke Harris	Louisiana Tech

=== All-Americans ===
The 2021 College Football All-America Teams are composed of the following College Football All-American first teams chosen by the following selector organizations: Associated Press (AP), Football Writers Association of America (FWAA), American Football Coaches Association (AFCA), Walter Camp Foundation (WCFF), The Sporting News (TSN), Sports Illustrated (SI), USA Today (USAT) ESPN, CBS Sports (CBS), FOX Sports (FOX) College Football News (CFN), Bleacher Report (BR), Scout.com, Phil Steele (PS), SB Nation (SB), Athlon Sports, Pro Football Focus (PFF) and Yahoo! Sports (Yahoo!).

Currently, the NCAA compiles consensus all-America teams in the sports of Division I-FBS football and Division I men's basketball using a point system computed from All-America teams named by coaches associations or media sources. The system consists of three points for a first-team honor, two points for second-team honor, and one point for third-team honor. Honorable mention and fourth team or lower recognitions are not accorded any points. Football consensus teams are compiled by position and the player accumulating the most points at each position is named first team consensus all-American. Currently, the NCAA recognizes All-Americans selected by the AP, AFCA, FWAA, TSN, and the WCFF to determine Consensus and Unanimous All-Americans. Any player named to the First Team by all five of the NCAA-recognized selectors is deemed a Unanimous All-American.

Position	Player	School	Selector	Unanimous	Consensus
Second Team All-Americans
WR	Jerreth Sterns	Western Kentucky	AP, FWAA, USAT		
RB	Sincere McCormick	UTSA	CBS, FWAA, USAT		

Position	Player	School	Selector	Unanimous	Consensus
Third Team All-Americans
RB	Sincere McCormick	UTSA	AP		

== NFL draft ==
The following list includes all C-USA players who were drafted in the 2022 NFL draft.

Player	Position	School	Draft Round	Round Pick	Overall Pick	Team
Alex Wright	DE	UAB	3	14	78	Cleveland Browns
DeAngelo Malone	LB	Western Kentucky	3	18	82	Atlanta Falcons
Spencer Burford	OT	UTSA	4	29	134	San Francisco 49ers
Bailey Zappe	QB	Western Kentucky	4	32	137	New England Patriots
Tariq Woolen	CB	UTSA	5	10	153	Seattle Seahawks
Nazeeh Johnson	S	Marshall	7	38	259	Kansas City Chiefs
