= Gordon Marshall =

Gordon Marshall may refer to:

- Gordon Marshall (sociologist) (born 1952), sociologist and former Vice-Chancellor of the University of Reading
- Gordon Marshall (cricketer) (born 1935), English cricketer
- Gordon Marshall (footballer, born 1939) (1939–2025), English goalkeeper who played for Hearts, Newcastle United and Hibs
- Gordon Marshall (footballer, born 1964), Scottish goalkeeper who played for Falkirk, Celtic and Kilmarnock (son of above)
- Gordon Marshall (a.k.a. Gordy Marshall), a drummer that tours with the rock band the Moody Blues
- Gordon S. Marshall (1919–2015), American electronics entrepreneur
