= Keith Dollery =

Australian cricketer

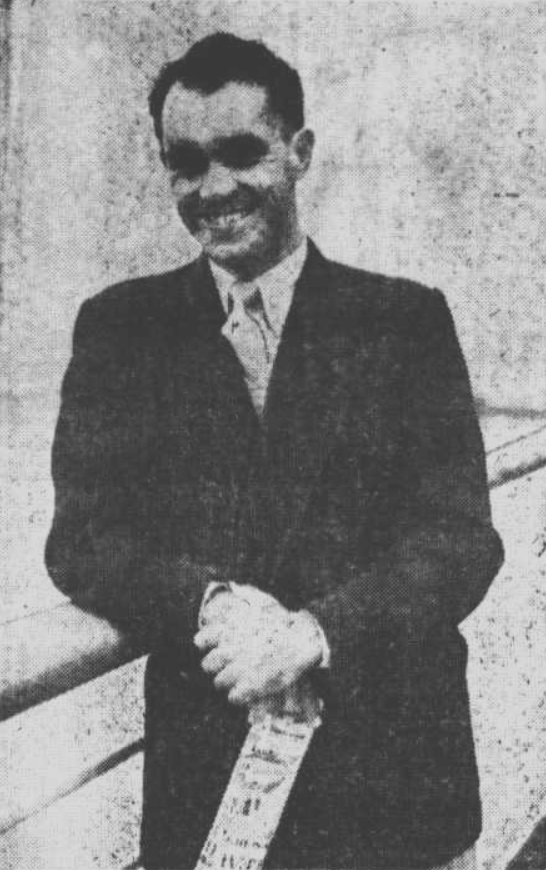
Keith Dollery, 1954.

Keith Robert Dollery (9 December 1924 – 18 August 2013) was an Australian cricketer who played first-class cricket for Queensland and Tasmania in his native country, for Auckland in New Zealand, and, most successfully, for Warwickshire in England between 1951 and 1956. He was born in Cooroy, Queensland and died at Gerringong, New South Wales. He was no relation to Tom Dollery, his captain at Warwickshire.

Dollery was a right-arm fast-medium bowler and a right-handed lower order batsman. He took a long time to establish himself in first-class cricket, playing without success in two first-class matches for Queensland in 1947–48 and in two further games in New Zealand for Auckland in 1949–50. He finally took his first wickets in his fifth game, played for Tasmania against Victoria in what was traditionally a first-class match, although Tasmania was at that stage not included in regular first-class fixtures with other Australian state teams: having taken two wickets in the first innings, in the second innings of this match Dollery took five for 60. That same Tasmanian season, he played twice against the English touring team, which included senior Warwickshire professional Eric Hollies, and from the start of the 1951 English cricket season Dollery began the residential qualification period for Warwickshire. He also played for Stockport in the Central Lancashire League.

Dollery was limited to second eleven fixtures and single first-class games against the touring sides in both 1951 and 1952, and his full-time cricket career did not begin in earnest until the 1953 season. Warwickshire's fast bowling was in transition, with Charles Grove past the age of 40 and Tom Pritchard in his late 30s, and Dollery was one of a group of younger players that included Jack Bannister and Roly Thompson, and others, though some were not always available because of National Service; Dollery enjoyed a good run in the first team in the first half of the 1953 season, and took 74 wickets at the respectable bowling average of 21.86 runs per wicket. His best return came in the match against Gloucestershire when he took six wickets for 38 runs in the first innings and then, bowling unchanged with Bannister, a further four for 22 in the second innings when Gloucestershire collapsed to 56 all out, Dollery taking the last three wickets in three balls, a hat-trick. Dollery's record in the 1954 season was similar, with 72 wickets at a slightly higher average of 24.75 and, again, most of his regular cricket played in the first half of the season. He was awarded his county cap in this season. In the match against Sussex, he took eight first-innings wickets for 42 runs, the best return of his career, with five of his victims clean-bowled.

From 1955, however, Dollery's career with Warwickshire took a downward turn. Picked for only about half the first-team matches in 1955 and overtaken by both Bannister and Thompson, he took only 38 wickets and his average was more than 30 runs per wicket, high for this period of English cricket. In 1956, there were days of individual triumph: against Gloucestershire, he took five wickets for 77 runs; against Kent he again took three wickets in three balls, a second hat-trick. But by mid-July he was out of the team and this time he did not return, not being re-engaged by the county at the end of the 1956 season, although he made a single second eleven appearance in 1957.

== See also ==
- List of Tasmanian representative cricketers
- List of Auckland representative cricketers
