= Alexander Wright =

Alexander Wright or Alex Wright may refer to:

== Sportspeople ==
- Alex Wright (born 1975), German wrestler
- Alex Wright (footballer, born 1897) (1895–1968), Scottish player for Aberdeen, Heart of Midlothian, Morton; player manager for Queen of the South
- Alex Wright (footballer, born 1925) (1925–1999), Scottish player for Hibernian, Barnsley, Tottenham, Bradford Park Avenue and Falkirk
- Alex Wright (footballer, born 1930) (1930–2000), Scottish football player and manager
- Alexander Wright (American football) (born 1967), American football player and college coach
- Alex Wright (American football) (born 2000), American football player
- Alex Wright (race walker) (born 1990), Irish race walker

== Other people ==
- Alexander Wright (VC) (1826–1858), Irish soldier in the British Army and Victoria Cross recipient
- Alex Wright (musician) (born 1980), Canadian musician and producer
- Alex Wright (author), American writer and information architect

== See also ==
- Alexander Matthew Wright (presenter) (born 1965), English television presenter and journalist
- Al Wright (disambiguation)
