= Abraham Beauplan =

American football player (born 2000)

Profile
- Position: Linebacker

Personal information
- Born: February 3, 2000 (age 26); Boynton Beach, Florida, U.S.
- Listed height: 5 ft 11 in (1.80 m)
- Listed weight: 241 lb (109 kg)

Career information
- High school: Boynton Beach
- College: Navarro (2018–2019); Marshall (2020–2022)
- NFL draft: 2023: undrafted

Career history
- Minnesota Vikings (2023)*; Detroit Lions (2024); St. Louis Battlehawks (2026)
- * Offseason or practice squad member only

Awards and highlights
- First-team All-C-USA (2021)
- Stats at Pro Football Reference

Abraham Beauplan (born February 3, 2000) is an American professional football linebacker. He played college football for the Navarro Bulldogs and Marshall Thundering Herd.

== College career ==
=== Navarro ===
Beauplan was rated a three-star prospect by Rivals.com and 247Sports.com coming out of high school and received 13 Division I offers, including Georgia Tech, Indiana, and Pittsburgh. Beauplan committed to Navarro College out of high school. He played at the community college for two seasons before transferring to Marshall University.

=== Marshall ===
In 2021, Beauplan led the Thundering Herd with 110 tackles. He finished the regular season as the C-USA's third-leading tackler and was named first team all-conference. He was named to the Bednarik Award preseason watchlist in 2022.

== College statistics ==
Legend
**Bold**	Career high

Year	Team	GP	Tackles					Interceptions						Fumbles			
Year	Team	GP	Solo	Ast	Cmb	TFL	Sk	PD	Int	Yds	Avg	Lng	TD	FF	FR	Yds	TD
2018	Navarro	9	34	9	43	1.0	1.0	0	0	0	0.0	0	0	1	0	0	0
2019	Navarro	11	**76**	57	**133**	10.5	**3.5**	1	0	0	0.0	0	0	**4**	**2**	**2**	0
2020	Marshall	10	16	39	55	5.5	0.0	0	0	0	0.0	0	0	3	0	0	0
2021	Marshall	**13**	43	**67**	110	**11.0**	2.5	0	0	0	0.0	0	0	1	0	0	0
2022	Marshall	12	21	45	66	6.5	1.0	**3**	**1**	**7**	**7.0**	**7**	0	1	0	0	0
NJCAA Career		20	110	66	176	11.5	4.5	1	0	0	0.0	0	0	5	2	2	0
FBS Career		35	80	151	231	23.0	3.5	3	1	7	7.0	7	0	5	0	0	0
Career		55	190	217	407	34.5	8.0	4	1	7	7.0	7	0	10	2	2	0

== Professional career ==
Pre-draft measurables
Height	Weight	Arm length	Hand span	Wingspan	20-yard shuttle	Three-cone drill	Vertical jump	Broad jump	Bench press
5 ft 11 in (1.80 m)	241 lb (109 kg)	31 3/4 in (0.81 m)	9 1/4 in (0.23 m)	6 ft 5 1/4 in (1.96 m)	4.62 s	7.33 s	35.5 in (0.90 m)	9 ft 9 in (2.97 m)	22 reps
All values from Pro Day

=== Minnesota Vikings ===
On April 29, 2023, Beauplan signed with the Minnesota Vikings as an undrafted free agent. He spent the preseason with the Vikings before being placed on injured reserve in August. He appeared in two of Minnesota's preseason games against the Seattle Seahawks and Tennessee Titans and recorded seven tackles, including one for loss, across those two games. He waived with an injury designation on September 5, 2023. On January 2, 2024, the Vikings announced they had signed Beauplan to their practice squad. On January 8, 2024, the Vikings signed Beauplan to a futures contract. He was waived on July 31.

=== Detroit Lions ===
On August 11, 2024, Beauplan signed with the Detroit Lions. He was waived on August 27. On September 26, Beauplan was signed to the practice squad. He was promoted to the active roster on November 2. He signed a reserve/future contract on January 20, 2025.

On May 27, 2025, Beauplan was waived by the Lions.

=== St. Louis Battlehawks ===
On January 14, 2026, Beauplan was selected by the St. Louis Battlehawks of the United Football League (UFL). He was not retained for the 2027 season.
