= Alan Wright (disambiguation) =

Alan Wright (born 1971) is an English football manager and former player.

Alan, Allan or Allen Wright are also the name of:

- Alan Wright (cricketer) (1905–1989), English cricketer
- Alan Wright (cricket administrator) (1938–2013), English cricket administrator
- Alan Wright (rugby union) (1914–1990), New Zealand rugby union player
- Allan Wright (1920–2015), British pilot
- Allan Wright (farmer) (1929–2022), New Zealand farming leader and businessman
- Allen Wright (1826–1885), principal chief of Choctaw Nation
- Allen Wright (journalist) (1932–1997), Scottish arts critic and journalist

== See also ==
- Al Wright (disambiguation)
