= Albert Wright (cricketer, born 1941) =

English cricketer (born 1941)

Personal information
- Full name: Albert Wright
- Born: 25 August 1941; Arley, Warwickshire
- Batting: Right-handed
- Bowling: Right-arm medium
- Role: Bowler

Domestic team information
- Years: Team
- 1960–1964: Warwickshire
- First-class debut: 22 June 1960 Warwickshire v Oxford University
- Last First-class: 10 July 1964 Warwickshire v Scotland
- List A debut: 22 May 1963 Warwickshire v Northamptonshire
- Last List A: 24 June 1964 Warwickshire v Northamptonshire

Career statistics
Competition	First-class	List A
Matches	76	2
Runs scored	315	12
Batting average	6.42	12.00
100s/50s	0/0	0/0
Top score	27	12
Balls bowled	14,531	101
Wickets	236	1
Bowling average	25.22	51.00
5 wickets in innings	11	0
10 wickets in match	2	0
Best bowling	6/58	1/30
Catches/stumpings	29/–	0/–
- Source: CricketArchive, 10 January 2014

Albert Wright (born 25 August 1941) is a former English cricketer who played first-class and List A cricket for Warwickshire between 1960 and 1964. He was a right-handed tail-end batsman and a right-arm medium-pace bowler. He was born at Arley in Warwickshire.

Wright had a brief first-class cricket career, but in one season, 1962, he was one of the leading wicket-takers in county cricket. He played for Warwickshire's second eleven from 1958 and made his first-class debut in nine games in the 1960 season, taking 21 wickets. There was an advance to 48 wickets from 17 matches in 1961, though they came at a cost of 32.52 runs per wicket, which was a high average for that period.

In 1962, one of Warwickshire's most successful bowlers from the previous season, the off-spinner Basil Bridge, was restricted by illness to no more than a few games, and, in the absence of spin alternatives, the county regularly fielded three medium-pacers, Jack Bannister, Tom Cartwright and Wright as its main bowling attack. The move was quite successful as all three took more 100 wickets each and Warwickshire rose nine places to third in the County Championship, though Wisden Cricketers' Almanack took the view that lack of variety in the attack was the reason the county had not won the title. Wright, with 116 wickets at an average of 21.31, was the leading wicket-taker of the three and, said Wisden, "appeared the most dangerous and should improve". Virtually all of Wright's career-best bowling was done in this 1962 season. Against Gloucestershire at Edgbaston, he took five for 100 and six for 91 to achieve a match analysis of 11 for 191. He bettered this later in the season with five for 87 and six for 58 – match figures of 11 for 145 – in the game against Surrey, also at Edgbaston, and these were the best match and innings figures of his career.

Wright's cricket career did not develop, however. In 1963, he was out of form and injured, and his tally of wickets dropped to 38; in no innings in the season did he take more three wickets. In 1964, he dropped out of the team and left the county staff at the end of the season, though he continued to play occasional second eleven matches through to 1969. In his last two seasons on the staff, he had played in one List A game in each year, without success.

Wright's batting was consistently negligible: he passed 20 only twice in his entire first-class career. He generally batted at No 11, usually rising to No 10 only when Roly Thompson, a more senior rabbit, was in the team.
