= Herbert Wright =

Herbert Wright may refer to:

- Herb Wright (1917–2015), American scientist
- Herbert Wright (politician) (1880–1944), Canadian politician
- Herbert Wright (producer) (1947–2005), science fiction television producer and writer
- Herbert Wright (wrestler) (1894–1982), British Olympic wrestler
- Herbert Harnell Wright (1848–1916), American educator
- Lil Herb (born 1995), American rapper

== See also ==
- Bert Wright (disambiguation)
