= Clarence Hicks =

American gridiron football player (born 1998)

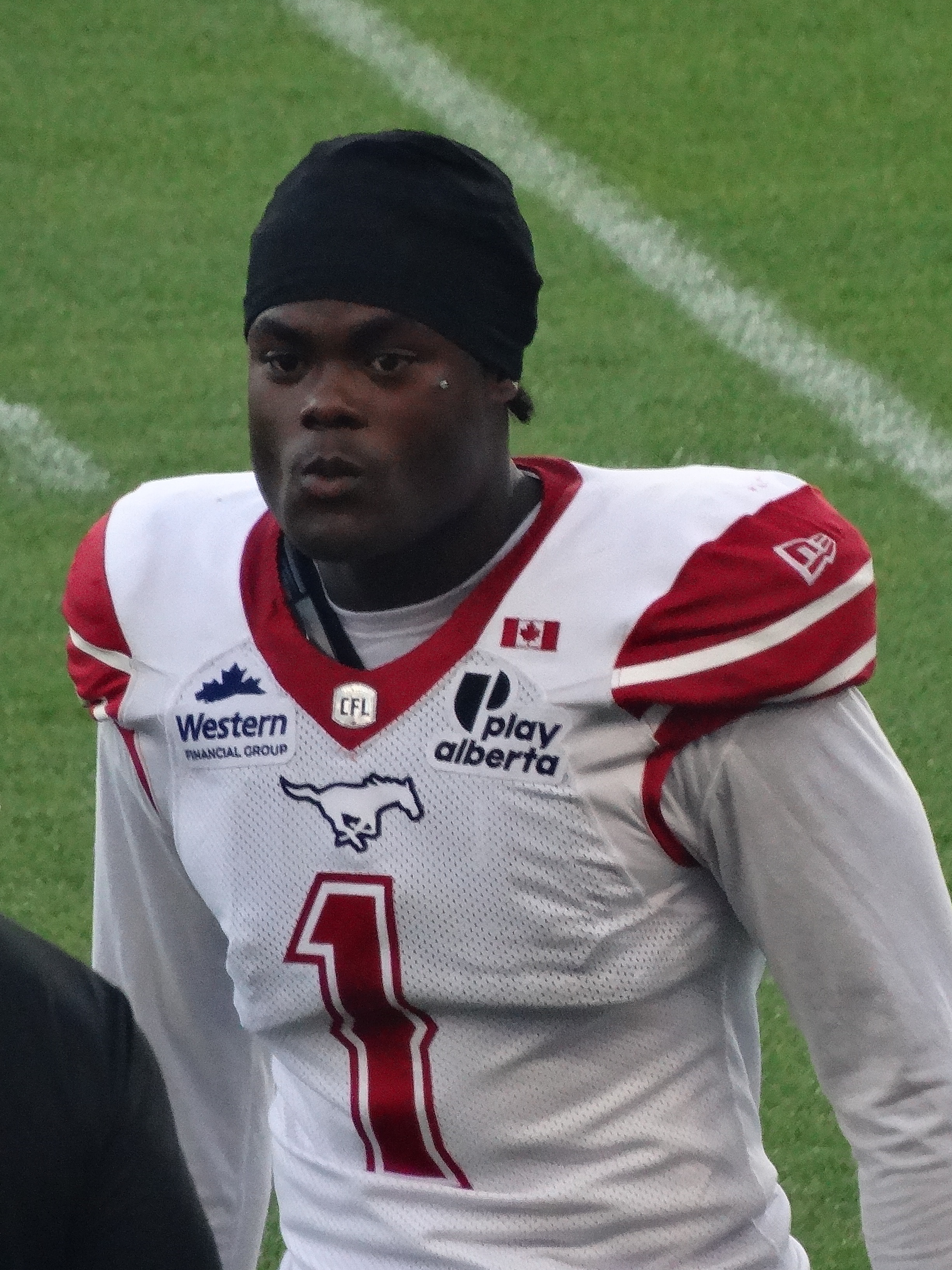
- Hicks with the Calgary Stampeders in 2026

No. 1 – Calgary Stampeders
- Position: Defensive lineman
- Roster status: Active
- CFL status: American

Personal information
- Born: December 7, 1998 (age 27)
- Listed height: 6 ft 2 in (1.88 m)
- Listed weight: 224 lb (102 kg)

Career information
- High school: Pine Forest (Pensacola, Florida)
- College: Hutchinson Community College (2017–2018); UTSA (2019–2021)
- NFL draft: 2022: undrafted

Career history
- Cincinnati Bengals (2022)*; Seattle Sea Dragons (2023); Calgary Stampeders (2024–present)
- * Offseason or practice squad member only

Awards and highlights
- 2x CFL West All-Star (2025, 2026); First-team All-C-USA (2021); Second-team All-KJCCC (2018)

Career CFL statistics as of 2026
- Games played: 54
- Total tackles: 67
- Sacks: 28
- Interceptions: 2
- Forced fumbles: 4
- Stats at CFL.ca

Clarence Hicks (born June 29, 1998) is an American professional football defensive lineman for the Calgary Stampeders of the Canadian Football League (CFL). Hicks previously played college football for the Hutchinson Blue Dragons and the UTSA Roadrunners. He also had stints in the National Football League (NFL) with the Cincinnati Bengals and in the XFL with the Seattle Sea Dragons.

== College career ==
Hicks played college football for the Hutchinson Blue Dragons from 2017 to 2018 and the UTSA Roadrunners from 2019 to 2021. He started his college career at the JUCO school, Hutchinson Community College, in Hutchinson, Kansas. Hicks played in 12 games and logged 42 tackles, 14 sacks and two forced fumbles. He earned Second-team All-KJCCC honors in 2018.

Hicks transferred to UTSA for the 2019 season where he played in 38 games. In total, he made 108 tackles including 31 tackles for loss, 12.5 sacks, three forced fumbles and two interceptions. In 2021, he was named to the First team All-C-USA team.

== Professional career ==
Pre-draft measurables
Height	Weight	Arm length	Hand span	Wingspan	40-yard dash	10-yard split	20-yard split	20-yard shuttle	Three-cone drill	Vertical jump	Broad jump	Bench press
6 ft 1 7/8 in (1.88 m)	225 lb (102 kg)	33 1/2 in (0.85 m)	9 1/4 in (0.23 m)	6 ft 5 5/8 in (1.97 m)	4.50 s	1.58 s	2.57 s	4.56 s	7.40 s	32.0 in (0.81 m)	10 ft 2 in (3.10 m)	22 reps
All values from Pro Day

=== Cincinnati Bengals ===
After not being selected in the 2022 NFL draft, Hicks signed with the Cincinnati Bengals as an undrafted free agent. He was waived by the team on August 31.

=== Seattle Sea Dragons ===
Hicks was selected with the 36th pick in the fifth round of the 2023 XFL Supplemental Draft by the Seattle Sea Dragons. He appeared in ten games and recorded 21 tackles, including three for a loss, two sacks and two pass deflections. The Sea Dragons folded when the XFL and USFL merged to create the United Football League (UFL).

=== Calgary Stampeders ===
On March 26, 2024, Hicks signed with the Calgary Stampeders. He made his CFL debut on June 7, against the Hamilton Tiger-Cats, where he recorded his first sack. He finished his first year of play where he had 14 tackles, including two tackles for loss, four sacks, two interceptions and one pass deflection. He changed his jersey number from 12 to 1 following the 2025 season.
