= Al Wright =

Al Wright may refer to:

- Al Wright (baseball manager) (1842–1905), American manager of the Philadelphia Athletics
- Al Wright (second baseman) (Albert Wright, 1912–1998), American Major League Baseball second baseman
- Al G. Wright (1916–2020), American band director at Purdue University

== See also ==
- Albert Wright (disambiguation)
- Alan Wright (disambiguation)
- Alexander Wright (disambiguation)
