= 2021 Marshall Thundering Herd football team =

American college football season

2021 Marshall Thundering Herd football

New Orleans Bowl, L 21–36 vs. Louisiana
- Conference: Conference USA
- East Division
- Record: 7–6 (5–3 C-USA)
- Head coach: Charles Huff (1st season)
- Offensive coordinator: Tim Cramsey (4th season)
- Offensive scheme: Pro spread
- Defensive coordinator: Lance Guidry (1st season)
- Base defense: 4–3
- Home stadium: Joan C. Edwards Stadium

2021 Conference USA football standings
	Conf.			Overall
Team	W		L	W		L
East Division
Western Kentucky xy	7	–	1	9	–	5
Marshall	5	–	3	7	–	6
Old Dominion	5	–	3	6	–	7
Middle Tennessee	4	–	4	7	–	6
Florida Atlantic	3	–	5	5	–	7
Charlotte	3	–	5	5	–	7
FIU	0	–	8	1	–	11
West Division
UTSA xy$	7	–	1	12	–	2
UAB	6	–	2	9	–	4
North Texas	5	–	3	6	–	7
UTEP	4	–	4	7	–	6
Rice	3	–	5	4	–	8
Southern Miss	2	–	6	3	–	9
Louisiana Tech	2	–	6	3	–	9
Championship: UTSA 49, Western Kentucky 41
$ – Conference champion; x – Division champion/co-champions; y – Championship game participant

The 2021 Marshall Thundering Herd football team represented Marshall University during the 2021 NCAA Division I FBS football season. The Thundering Herd played their home games at the Joan C. Edwards Stadium in Huntington, West Virginia, and competed in the East Division of Conference USA (CUSA). The team was coached by first-year head coach Charles Huff.

On October 30, 2021, Marshall announced they would become a member of the Sun Belt Conference. On March 29, it was announced they would officially join on July 1, 2022, making this the final season competing in C-USA.

== Schedule ==
Marshall announced its 2021 football schedule on January 27, 2021. The 2021 schedule consisted of 6 home and 6 away games in the regular season.

Date	Time	Opponent	Site	TV	Result	Attendance
September 4	3:30 p.m.	at Navy*	Navy–Marine Corps Memorial Stadium; Annapolis, MD	CBSSN	W 49–7	30,131
September 11	6:30 p.m.	North Carolina Central*	Joan C. Edwards Stadium; Huntington, WV	ESPN+	W 44–10	24,521
September 18	6:00 p.m.	East Carolina*	Joan C. Edwards Stadium; Huntington, WV (rivalry)	CBSSN Facebook	L 38–42	24,833
September 23	7:30 p.m.	at Appalachian State*	Kidd Brewer Stadium; Boone, NC (rivalry)	ESPN	L 30–31	28,377
October 2	7:00 p.m.	at Middle Tennessee	Johnny "Red" Floyd Stadium; Murfreesboro, TN	Stadium	L 28–34	15,806
October 9	2:00 p.m.	Old Dominion^{†}	Joan C. Edwards Stadium; Huntington, WV	CBSSN Facebook	W 20–13 ^{OT}	24,172
October 15	7:00 p.m.	at North Texas	Apogee Stadium; Denton, TX	CBSSN	W 49–21	13,123
October 30	3:30 p.m.	FIU	Joan C. Edwards Stadium; Huntington, WV	Stadium	W 38–0	18,466
November 6	6:00 p.m.	at Florida Atlantic	FAU Stadium; Boca Raton, FL	CBSSN Facebook	W 28–13	21,803
November 13	3:30 p.m.	UAB	Joan C. Edwards Stadium; Huntington, WV	CBSSN	L 14–21	19,329
November 20	3:30 p.m.	at Charlotte	Jerry Richardson Stadium; Charlotte, NC	Stadium	W 49–28	13,211
November 27	3:30 p.m.	Western Kentucky	Joan C. Edwards Stadium; Huntington, WV	CBSSN	L 21–53	19,134
December 18	9:15 p.m.	vs. No. 23 Louisiana*	Caesars Superdome; New Orleans, LA (New Orleans Bowl)	ESPN	L 21–36	21,642
*Non-conference game; ^{†}Homecoming; Rankings from AP Poll and CFP Rankings released prior to game; All times are in Eastern time

== Game summaries ==
=== At Navy ===
Game One – Marshall Thundering Herd (0–0) at Navy Midshipmen (0–0)

Quarter	1	2	3	4	Total
Thundering Herd	14	7	7	21	49
Midshipmen	0	0	0	7	7

at Navy–Marine Corps Memorial Stadium • Annapolis, Maryland

- Date: Saturday, September 4, 2021
- Game time: 3:30 p.m. EDT
- Game weather: Clear • Temperature: 76 °F (24 °C) • Wind: SW 5–10 mph
- Game attendance: 30,131
- Referee: Scott Hardin
- TV announcers (CBSSN): Chick Hernandez (play-by-play), Randy Cross (analyst), Sheehan Stanwick-Burch (sideline)

Game information

First quarter

- (12:23) MRSH – Rasheen Ali 2 yard rush, Andrew Sanders kick (Drive: 9 plays, 75 yards, 2:37; Marshall 7–0)
- (6:46) MRSH – Rasheen Ali 3 yard rush, Andrew Sanders kick (Drive: 6 plays, 53 yards, 1:46; Marshall 14–0)

Second quarter

- (10:24) MRSH – Rasheen Ali 4 yard rush, Andrew Sanders kick (Drive: 5 plays, 25 yards, 1:10; Marshall 21–0)

Third quarter

- (11:56) MRSH – Sheldon Evans 9 yard rush, Andrew Sanders kick (Drive: 5 plays, 71 yards, 1:26; Marshall 28–0)

Fourth quarter

- (12:04) NAVY – Xavier Arline 1 yard rush, Bijan Nichols kick (Drive: 14 plays, 82 yards, 6:20; Marshall 28–7)
- (8:02) MRSH – Rasheen Ali 1 yard rush, Andrew Sanders kick (Drive: 11 plays, 60 yards, 4:02; Marshall 35–7)
- (5:31) MRSH – Sheldon Evans 1 yard rush, Andrew Sanders kick (Drive: 3 plays, 49 yards, 0:55; Marshall 42–7)
- (2:01) MRSH – EJ Horton 30 yard pass from Luke Zban, Andrew Sanders kick (Drive: 1 play, 30 yards, 0:07; Marshall 49–7)

Statistics	MRSH	NAVY
First downs	23	24
Plays–yards	63–464	92–398
Rushes–yards	30–101	76–337
Passing yards	363	61
Passing: comp–att–int	21–33–2	5–16–2
Time of possession	18:41	41:19

Team	Category	Player	Statistics
Marshall	Passing	Grant Wells	20/30, 333 yards, 2 INT
Marshall	Rushing	Rasheen Ali	14 carries, 59 yards, 4 TD
Marshall	Receiving	Talik Keaton	5 receptions, 100 yards
Navy	Passing	Maasai Maynor	2/6, 27 yards
Navy	Rushing	James Harris II	11 carries, 80 yards
Navy	Receiving	Mychal Cooper	2 receptions, 30 yards

=== North Carolina Central ===
Game Two – North Carolina Central Eagles (1–0) at Marshall Thundering Herd (1–0)

Quarter	1	2	3	4	Total
Eagles	0	7	0	3	10
Thundering Herd	6	24	7	7	44

at Joan C. Edwards Stadium • Huntington, West Virginia

- Date: Saturday, September 11, 2021
- Game time: 6:30 p.m. EDT
- Game weather: Sunny • Temperature: 81 °F (27 °C) • Wind: None
- Game attendance: 24,521
- Referee: Patrick Foy
- TV announcers (ESPN+): Jake Griffith (play-by-play), Dave Wilson (analyst)

Game information

First quarter

- (9:19) MRSH – Grant Wells 10 yard rush, Grant Wells pass failed (Drive: 9 plays, 58 yards, 2:08; Marshall 6–0)

Second quarter

- (14:05) MRSH – Talik Keaton 14 yard pass from Grant Wells, Andrew Sanders kick (Drive: 14 plays, 75 yards, 4:14; Marshall 13–0)
- (8:57) MRSH – Rasheen Ali 3 yard pass from Grant Wells, Andrew Sanders kick (Drive: 11 plays, 61 yards, 3:46; Marshall 20–0)
- (3:23) NCCU – Mookie Collier 4 yard pass from Davius Richard, Adrian Olivio kick (Drive: 3 plays, 10 yards, 1:36; Marshall 20–7)
- (2:04) MRSH – Talik Keaton 46 yard pass from Grant Wells, Andrew Sanders kick (Drive: 5 plays, 62 yards, 1:19; Marshall 27–7)
- (0:25) MRSH – Andrew Sanders 27 yard field goal (Drive: 5 plays, 19 yards, 0:51; Marshall 30–7)

Third quarter

- (4:40) MRSH – Knowledge McDaniel 3 yard rush, Andrew Sanders kick (Drive: 10 plays, 90 yards, 3:02; Marshall 37–7)

Fourth quarter

- (7:28) MRSH – Ethan Payne 8 yard rush, Shane Ciucci kick (Drive: 13 plays, 99 yards, 4:57; Marshall 44–7)
- (0:53) NCCU – Adrian Olivio 21 yard field goal (Drive: 14 plays, 71 yards, 6:35; Marshall 44–10)

Statistics	NCCU	MRSH
First downs	9	38
Plays–yards	60–177	100–700
Rushes–yards	28–71	42–237
Passing yards	106	463
Passing: comp–att–int	14–32–0	42–58–2
Time of possession	27:24	32:36

Team	Category	Player	Statistics
NC Central	Passing	Davius Richard	14/32, 106 yards, 1 TD
NC Central	Rushing	Jamal Currie-Elliott	9 carries, 34 yards
NC Central	Receiving	Tyler Barnes	3 receptions, 40 yards
Marshall	Passing	Grant Wells	34/47, 347 yards, 3 TD, 1 INT
Marshall	Rushing	Knowledge McDaniel	7 carries, 67 yards, 1 TD
Marshall	Receiving	Jayden Harrison	4 receptions, 81 yards

=== East Carolina ===
Game Three – East Carolina Pirates (0–2) at Marshall Thundering Herd (2–0)

Quarter	1	2	3	4	Total
Pirates	7	14	0	21	42
Thundering Herd	10	14	14	0	38

at Joan C. Edwards Stadium • Huntington, West Virginia

- Date: Saturday, September 18, 2021
- Game time: 6:00 p.m. EDT
- Game weather: Sunny • Temperature: 85 °F (29 °C) • Wind: None
- Game attendance: 24,833
- Referee: Luke Richard
- TV announcers (CBS Sports Facebook): Michael Grady (play-by-play), Corey Chavous (analyst)

Game information

First quarter

- (12:20) MRSH – Andrew Sanders 29 yard field goal (Drive: 9 plays, 63 yards, 2:40; Marshall 3–0)
- (9:13) ECU – Tyler Snead 24 yard pass from Holton Ahlers, Owen Daffer kick (Drive: 8 plays, 75 yards, 3:07; East Carolina 7–3)
- (5:20) MRSH – Willie Johnson 19 yard pass from Grant Wells, Andrew Sanders kick (Drive: 6 plays, 37 yards, 1:42; Marshall 10–7)

Second quarter

- (12:33) ECU – Keaton Mitchell 88 yard rush, Owen Daffer kick (Drive: 3 plays, 96 yards, 1:24; East Carolina 14–10)
- (10:28) MRSH – Rasheen Ali 26 yard rush, Andrew Sanders kick (Drive: 5 plays, 75 yards, 2:05; Marshall 17–14)
- (7:31) MRSH – Rasheen Ali 1 yard rush, Andrew Sanders kick (Drive: 4 plays, 65 yards, 1:21; Marshall 24–14)
- (0:08) ECU – Shane Calhoun 5 yard pass from Holton Ahlers, Owen Daffer kick (Drive: 13 plays, 53 yards, 3:25; Marshall 24–21)

Third quarter

- (10:23) MRSH – Rasheen Ali 49 yard rush, Andrew Sanders kick (Drive: 4 plays, 63 yards, 1:34; Marshall 31–21)
- (1:03) MRSH – Grant Wells 6 yard rush, Andrew Sanders kick (Drive: 6 plays, 90 yards, 2:00; Marshall 38–21)

Fourth quarter

- (7:31) ECU – Holton Ahlers 5 yard rush, Owen Daffer kick (Drive: 12 plays, 78 yards, 4:33; Marshall 38–28)
- (2:31) ECU – Holton Ahlers 27 yard pass from Tyler Snead, Owen Daffer kick (Drive: 6 plays, 80 yards, 2:16; Marshall 38–35)
- (0:55) ECU – Rahjai Harris 1 yard rush, Owen Daffer kick (Drive: 6 plays, 53 yards, 1:36; East Carolina 42–38)

Statistics	ECU	MRSH
First downs	27	24
Plays–yards	91–563	76–647
Rushes–yards	40–168	36–214
Passing yards	395	433
Passing: comp–att–int	31–51–0	24–40–2
Time of possession	30:19	29:41

Team	Category	Player	Statistics
East Carolina	Passing	Holton Ahlers	30/48, 368 yards, 2 TD
East Carolina	Rushing	Keaton Mitchell	14 carries, 135 yards, 1 TD
East Carolina	Receiving	Shane Calhoun	8 receptions, 114 yards, 1 TD
Marshall	Passing	Grant Wells	24/39, 433 yards, 1 TD, 2 INT
Marshall	Rushing	Rasheen Ali	24 carries, 189 yards, 3 TD
Marshall	Receiving	Corey Gammage	8 receptions, 180 yards

=== At Appalachian State ===
Game Four – Marshall Thundering Herd (2–1) at Appalachian State Mountaineers (2–1)

Quarter	1	2	3	4	Total
Thundering Herd	6	14	10	0	30
Mountaineers	7	14	0	10	31

at Kidd Brewer Stadium • Boone, North Carolina

- Date: Thursday, September 23, 2021
- Game time: 7:30 p.m. EDT
- Game weather: Sunny • Temperature: 53 °F (12 °C) • Wind: NW 3 mph
- Game attendance: 28,377
- Referee: Kevin Vicknair
- TV announcers (ESPN): Matt Barrie (play-by-play), Roddy Jones (analyst)

Game information

First quarter

- (9:38) APP – Camerun Peoples 1 yard rush, Chandler Staton kick (Drive: 9 plays, 80 yards, 4:08; Appalachian State 7–0)
- (5:36) MRSH – Shane Ciucci 22 yard field goal (Drive: 11 plays, 71 yards, 4:02; Appalachian State 7–3)
- (0:39) MRSH – Shane Ciucci 33 yard field goal (Drive: 11 plays, 66 yards, 3:11; Appalachian State 7–6)

Second quarter

- (12:36) MRSH – Xavier Gainers 56 yard pass from Grant Wells, Shane Ciucci kick (Drive: 5 plays, 85 yards, 1:36; Marshall 13–7)
- (7:13) APP – Camerun Peoples 2 yard rush, Chandler Staton kick (Drive: 15 plays, 75 yards, 5:23; Appalachian State 14–13)
- (7:01) MRSH – Rasheen Ali 97 yard kickoff return, Shane Ciucci kick (Marshall 20–14)
- (0:04) APP – Camerun Peoples 2 yard rush, Chandler Staton kick (Drive: 8 plays, 72 yards, 1:54; Appalachian State 21–20)

Third quarter

- (7:54) MRSH – Shane Ciucci 46 yard field goal (Drive: 6 plays, 46 yards, 2:03; Marshall 23–21)
- (4:16) MRSH – Rasheen Ali 8 yard rush, Shane Ciucci kick (Drive: 4 plays, 47 yards, 1:15; Marshall 30–21)

Fourth quarter

- (14:09) APP – Corey Sutton 24 yard pass from Chase Brice, Chandler Staton kick (Drive: 6 plays, 91 yards, 1:41; Marshall 30–28)
- (5:45) APP – Chandler Staton 45 yard field goal (Drive: 10 plays, 53 yards, 4:32; Appalachian State 31–30)

Statistics	MRSH	APP
First downs	20	39
Plays–yards	61–397	93–566
Rushes–yards	28–127	54–283
Passing yards	270	283
Passing: comp–att–int	18–33–0	24–39–1
Time of possession	22:38	37:22

Team	Category	Player	Statistics
Marshall	Passing	Grant Wells	18/33, 270 yards, 1 TD
Marshall	Rushing	Rasheen Ali	17 carries, 83 yards, 1 TD
Marshall	Receiving	Xavier Gaines	5 receptions, 104 yards, 1 TD
App State	Passing	Chase Brice	24/39, 283 yards, 1 TD, 1 INT
App State	Rushing	Nate Noel	20 carries, 187 yards
App State	Receiving	Corey Sutton	10 receptions, 127 yards, 1 TD

=== At Middle Tennessee ===
Game Five – Marshall Thundering Herd (2–2) at Middle Tennessee Blue Raiders (1–3)

Quarter	1	2	3	4	Total
Thundering Herd	0	14	0	14	28
Blue Raiders	7	21	6	0	34

at Johnny "Red" Floyd Stadium • Murfreesboro, Tennessee

- Date: Saturday, October 2, 2021
- Game time: 7:00 p.m. EDT
- Game weather: Cloudy • Temperature: 78 °F (26 °C) • Wind: N 4 mph
- Game attendance: 15,806
- Referee: Kevin Vicknair
- TV announcers (Stadium): Chris Hassel (play-by-play), Sed Bonner (analyst)

Game information

First quarter

- (9:04) MTSU – Mike DeLiello 3 yard rush, Zeke Rankin kick (Drive: 10 plays, 62 yards, 4:18; Middle Tennessee 7–0)

Second quarter

- (12:41) MTSU – Jarrin Pierce 13 yard pass from Chase Cunningham, Zeke Rankin kick (Drive: 8 plays, 58 yards, 2:28; Middle Tennessee 14–0)
- (10:56) MRSH – Rasheen Ali 12 yard rush, Shane Ciucci kick (Drive: 4 plays, 73 yards, 0:20; Middle Tennessee 14–7)
- (9:04) MTSU – Chaton Mobley 41 yard rush, Zeke Rankin kick (Drive: 4 plays, 49 yards, 1:41; Middle Tennessee 21–7)
- (5:52) MTSU – Jaylin Lane 34 yard pass from Chase Cunningham, Zeke Rankin kick (Drive: 6 plays, 69 yards, 2:02; Middle Tennessee 28–7)
- (0:55) MRSH – Rasheen Ali 1 yard rush, Shane Ciucci kick (Drive: 8 plays, 80 yards, 2:05; Middle Tennessee 28–14)

Third quarter

- (2:30) MTSU – Reed Blankenship 90 yard fumble recovery, Zeke Rankin kick blocked (Middle Tennessee 34–14)

Fourth quarter

- (9:44) MRSH – Rasheen Ali 2 yard rush, Shane Ciucci kick (Drive: 17 plays, 89 yards, 4:25; Middle Tennessee 34–21)
- (1:12) MRSH – Shadeed Ahmed 17 yard pass from Grant Wells, Shane Ciucci kick (Drive: 12 plays, 97 yards, 3:03; Middle Tennessee 34–28)

Statistics	MRSH	MTSU
First downs	28	16
Plays–yards	82–493	70–314
Rushes–yards	35–172	49–209
Passing yards	321	105
Passing: comp–att–int	31–47–2	12–21–1
Time of possession	26:45	33:15

Team	Category	Player	Statistics
Marshall	Passing	Grant Wells	31/47, 321 yards, 1 TD, 2 INT
Marshall	Rushing	Rasheen Ali	19 carries, 113 yards, 3 TD
Marshall	Receiving	Corey Gammage	7 receptions, 81 yards
Middle Tennessee	Passing	Chase Cunningham	12/21, 105 yards, 2 TD, 1 INT
Middle Tennessee	Rushing	Chaton Mobley	15 carries, 132 yards, 1 TD
Middle Tennessee	Receiving	Jaylin Lane	1 reception, 34 yards, 1 TD

=== Old Dominion ===
Game Six – Old Dominion Monarchs (1–4) at Marshall Thundering Herd (2–3)

Quarter	1	2	3	4	OT	Total
Monarchs	7	3	0	3	0	13
Thundering Herd	3	3	0	7	7	20

at Joan C. Edwards Stadium • Huntington, West Virginia

- Date: Saturday, October 9, 2021
- Game time: 2:00 p.m. EDT
- Game weather: Sunny • Temperature: 79 °F (26 °C) • Wind: None
- Game attendance: 24,172
- Referee: Jonathan Noli
- TV announcers (CBS Sports Facebook): Chris Hassel (play-by-play), Ben Leber (analyst)

Game information

First quarter

- (3:59) MRSH – Shane Ciucci 42 yard field goal (Drive: 4 plays, –6 yards, 1:21; Marshall 3–0)
- (0:25) ODU – Ali Jennings 33 yard pass from D. J. Mack Jr, Nick Rice kick (Drive: 9 plays, 81 yards, 3:34; Old Dominion 7–3)

Second quarter

- (6:38) ODU – Nick Rice 47 yard field goal (Drive: 13 plays, 73 yards, 5:48; Old Dominion 10–3)
- (0:25) MRSH – Shane Ciucci 22 yard field goal (Drive: 14 plays, 76 yards, 6:13; Old Dominion 10–6)

Third quarter
No scoring plays
Fourth quarter

- (2:37) ODU – Nick Rice 45 yard field goal (Drive: 10 plays, 32 yards, 5:05; Old Dominion 13–6)
- (0:33) MRSH – Willie Johnson 52 yard pass from Grant Wells, Shane Ciucci kick (Drive: 8 plays, 75 yards, 2:04; Tied 13–13)

Overtime

- MRSH – Shadeed Ahmed 22 yard pass from Grant Wells, Shane Ciucci kick (Drive: 2 plays, 25 yards; Marshall 20–13)

Statistics	ODU	MRSH
First downs	19	24
Plays–yards	73–314	78–390
Rushes–yards	50–208	32–91
Passing yards	106	299
Passing: comp–att–int	10–23–2	30–46–2
Time of possession	29:56	30:04

Team	Category	Player	Statistics
Old Dominion	Passing	D. J. Mack Jr	9/22, 106 yards, 1 TD, 2 INT
Old Dominion	Rushing	Blake Watson	26 carries, 168 yards
Old Dominion	Receiving	Ali Jennings	1 reception, 33 yards, 1 TD
Marshall	Passing	Grant Wells	30/46, 299 yards, 2 TD, 2 INT
Marshall	Rushing	Rasheen Ali	21 carries, 77 yards
Marshall	Receiving	Shadeed Ahmed	7 receptions, 77 yards, 1 TD

=== At North Texas ===
Game Seven – Marshall Thundering Herd (3–3) at North Texas Mean Green (1–4)

Quarter	1	2	3	4	Total
Thundering Herd	14	28	0	7	49
Mean Green	0	7	0	14	21

at Apogee Stadium • Denton, Texas

- Date: Friday, October 15, 2021
- Game time: 7:00 p.m. EDT
- Game weather: Sunny • Temperature: 70 °F (21 °C) • Wind: N 22 mph
- Game attendance: 13,123
- Referee: Patrick Foy
- TV announcers (CBSSN): Jason Horowitz (play-by-play), Donte Whitner (analyst)

Game information

First quarter

- (9:16) MRSH – Rasheen Ali 8 yard rush, Shane Ciucci kick (Drive: 10 plays, 67 yards, 3:42; Marshall 7–0)
- (3:41) MRSH – Grant Wells 3 yard rush, Shane Ciucci kick (Drive: 10 plays, 43 yards, 4:22; Marshall 14–0)

Second quarter

- (14:24) MRSH – Jayden Harrison 6 yard pass from Grant Wells, Shane Ciucci kick (Drive: 5 plays, 80 yards, 1:47; Marshall 21–0)
- (7:01) MRSH – Grant Wells 3 yard rush, Shane Ciucci kick (Drive: 12 plays, 82 yards, 5:45; Marshall 28–0)
- (4:45) MRSH – Xavier Gaines 33 yard pass from Grant Wells, Shane Ciuccie kick (Drive: 1 plays, 33 yards, 0:11; Marshall 35–0)
- (4:24) UNT – DeAndre Torrey 75 yard rush, Ethan Mooney kick (Drive: 1 plays, 75 yards, 0:21; Marshall 35–7)
- (2:18) MRSH – Rasheen Ali 1 yard rush, Shane Ciucci kick (Drive: 5 plays, 65 yards, 2:06; Marshall 42–7)

Third quarter
No scoring plays
Fourth quarter

- (12:09) MRSH – Grant Wells 3 yard rush, Shane Ciucci kick (Drive: 3 plays, 46 yards, 1:03; Marshall 49–7)
- (9:49) UNT – DeAndre Torrey 51 rush, Ethan Mooney kick (Drive: 6 plays, 90 yards, 2:20; Marshall 49–14)
- (2:37) UNT – Ayo Adeyi 14 rush, Ethan Mooney kick (Drive: 7 plays, 58 yards, 2:35; Marshall 49–21)

Statistics	MRSH	UNT
First downs	24	18
Plays–yards	72–477	78–411
Rushes–yards	40–154	46–277
Passing yards	323	134
Passing: comp–att–int	24–32–1	17–32–2
Time of possession	32:14	27:46

Team	Category	Player	Statistics
Marshall	Passing	Grant Wells	24/32, 323 yards, 2 TD, 1 INT
Marshall	Rushing	Rasheen Ali	20 carries, 109 yards, 2 TD
Marshall	Receiving	Xavier Gaines	5 receptions, 77 yards, 1 TD
North Texas	Passing	Austin Aune	16/31, 121 yards, 2 INT
North Texas	Rushing	DeAndre Torrey	20 carries, 179 yards, 2 TD
North Texas	Receiving	Jason Pirtle	5 receptions, 35 yards

=== FIU ===
Game Eight – FIU Panthers (1–6) at Marshall Thundering Herd (4–3)

Quarter	1	2	3	4	Total
Panthers	0	0	0	0	0
Thundering Herd	3	21	7	7	38

at Joan C. Edwards Stadium • Huntington, West Virginia

- Date: Saturday, October 30, 2021
- Game time: 3:30 p.m. EDT
- Game weather: Rain • Temperature: 55 °F (13 °C) • Wind: N/A
- Game attendance: 18,466
- Referee: Rodney Burnette
- TV announcers (Stadium): Noah Coslov and Max Starks

Game information

First quarter

- (6:50) MRSH – Shane Ciucci 29 yard field goal (Drive: 12 plays, 68 yards, 3:30; Marshall 3–0)

Second quarter

- (9:00) MRSH – Grant Wells 2 yard rush, Shane Ciucci kick (Drive: 7 plays, 35 yards, 2:56; Marshall 10–0)
- (7:33) MRSH – Sheldon Evans 41 yard rush, Shane Ciucci kick (Drive: 2 plays, 48 yards, 0:37; Marshall 17–0)
- (3:16) MRSH – Rasheen Ali 6 yard rush, Shane Ciucci kick (Drive: 9 plays, 77 yards, 2:46; Marshall 24–0)

Third quarter

- (0:30) MRSH – Rasheen Ali 2 yard rush, Shane Ciucci kick (Drive: 16 plays, 80 yards, 6:56; Marshall 31–0)

Fourth quarter

- (9:16) MRSH – Ethan Payne 1 yard rush, Shane Ciucci kick (Drive: 5 plays, 38 yards, 2:08; Marshall 38–0)

Statistics	FIU	MRSH
First downs	15	24
Plays–yards	66–288	77–456
Rushes–yards	31–108	46–246
Passing yards	180	210
Passing: comp–att–int	18–35–1	24–31–0
Time of possession	29:13	30:47

Team	Category	Player	Statistics
FIU	Passing	Max Bortenschlager	14/28, 128 yards, 1 INT
FIU	Rushing	D'Vonte Price	10 carries, 51 yards
FIU	Receiving	Rivaldo Fairweather	4 receptions, 59 yards
Marshall	Passing	Grant Wells	20/25, 184 yards
Marshall	Rushing	Rasheen Ali	26 carries, 133 yards, 2 TD
Marshall	Receiving	Shadeed Ahmed	5 receptions, 52 yards

=== At Florida Atlantic ===
Game Nine – Marshall Thundering Herd (5–3) at Florida Atlantic Owls (5–3)

Quarter	1	2	3	4	Total
Thundering Herd	7	14	7	0	28
Owls	10	3	0	0	13

at FAU Stadium • Boca Raton, Florida

- Date: Saturday, November 6, 2021
- Game time: 6:00 p.m. EDT
- Game weather: Sunny • Temperature: 73 °F (23 °C) • Wind: N/A
- Game attendance: 21,803
- Referee: Patrick Foy
- TV: CBS Sports Facebook

Game information

First quarter

- (14:46) MRSH – Jayden Harrison 99 yard kickoff return, Shane Ciucci kick (Marshall 7–0)
- (12:45) FAU – Brandon Robinson 27 yard pass from N'Kosi Perry, Aaron Shahriari kick (Drive: 5 plays, 75 yards, 2:01; Tied 7–7)
- (6:52) FAU – Aaron Shahriari 37 yard field goal (Drive: 6 plays, 34 yards, 3:25; Florida Atlantic 10–7)

Second quarter

- (13:31) FAU – Aaron Shahriari 38 yard field goal (Drive: 10 plays, 33 yards, 4:05; Florida Atlantic 13–7)
- (9:18) MRSH – Rasheen Ali 3 yard rush, Shane Ciucci kick (Drive: 10 plays, 75 yards, 4:13; Marshall 14–13)
- (0:37) MRSH – Rasheen Ali 21 yard rush, Shane Ciucci kick (Drive: 2 plays, 28 yards, 0:24; Marshall 21–13)

Third quarter

- (1:51) MRSH – Willie Johnson 65 yard pass from Grant Wells, Shane Ciucci kick (Drive: 4 plays, 76 yards, 1:36; Marshall 28–13)

Fourth quarter
No scoring plays

Statistics	MRSH	FAU
First downs	20	21
Plays–yards	63–447	78–441
Rushes–yards	25–96	47–243
Passing yards	351	198
Passing: comp–att–int	26–38–1	15–31–0
Time of possession	29:41	30:19

Team	Category	Player	Statistics
Marshall	Passing	Grant Wells	26/38, 351 yards, 1 TD, 1 INT
Marshall	Rushing	Rasheen Ali	18 carries, 90 yards, 2 TD
Marshall	Receiving	Willie Johnson	5 receptions, 140 yards, 1 TD
Florida Atlantic	Passing	N'Kosi Perry	15/29, 198 yards, 1 TD
Florida Atlantic	Rushing	Johnny Ford	13 carries, 138 yards
Florida Atlantic	Receiving	Willie Wright	2 receptions, 69 yards

=== UAB ===
Game Ten – UAB Blazers (6–3) at Marshall Thundering Herd (6–3)

Quarter	1	2	3	4	Total
Blazers	14	0	7	0	21
Thundering Herd	0	7	7	0	14

at Joan C. Edwards Stadium • Huntington, West Virginia

- Date: Saturday, November 13, 2021
- Game time: 3:30 p.m. EST
- Game weather: Cloudy • Temperature: 43 °F (6 °C) • Wind: N/A
- Game attendance: 19,329
- Referee: Jonathan Noli
- TV announcers (CBSSN): John Sadak (play-by-play), Randy Cross (analyst)

Game information

First quarter

- (12:39) UAB – DeWayne McBride 3 yard rush, Matt Quinn kick (Drive: 5 plays, 81 yards, 2:21; UAB 7–0)
- (1:25) UAB – DeWayne McBride 15 yard rush, Matt Quinn kick (Drive: 11 plays, 99 yards, 6:13; UAB 14–0)

Second quarter

- (1:05) MRSH – Jayden Harrison 36 yard pass from Grant Wells, Shane Ciucci kick (Drive: 8 plays, 87 yards, 1:43; UAB 14–7)

Third quarter

- (4:18) MRSH – Corey Gammage 17 yard pass from Grant Wells, Shane Ciucci kick (Drive: 10 plays, 57 yards, 4:33; Tied 14–14)
- (0:36) UAB – Dylan Hopkins 1 yard rush, Matt Quinn kick (Drive: 6 plays, 75 yards, 3:42; UAB 21–14)

Fourth quarter
No scoring plays

Statistics	UAB	MRSH
First downs	17	16
Plays–yards	65–338	60–269
Rushes–yards	47–88	21–37
Passing yards	250	232
Passing: comp–att–int	13–18–0	22–39–1
Time of possession	37:43	22:17

Team	Category	Player	Statistics
UAB	Passing	Dylan Hopkins	13/18, 250 yards
UAB	Rushing	DeWayne McBride	25 carries, 108 yards, 2 TD
UAB	Receiving	Gerrit Prince	5 receptions, 100 yards
Marshall	Passing	Grant Wells	22/39, 232 yards, 2 TD, 1 INT
Marshall	Rushing	Rasheen Ali	16 carries, 41 yards
Marshall	Receiving	Corey Gammage	8 receptions, 67 yards, 1 TD

=== At Charlotte ===
Game Eleven – Marshall Thundering Herd (6–4) at Charlotte 49ers (5–5)

Quarter	1	2	3	4	Total
Thundering Herd	7	14	21	7	49
49ers	7	7	0	14	28

at Jerry Richardson Stadium • Charlotte, North Carolina

- Date: Saturday, November 20, 2021
- Game time: 3:30 p.m. EST
- Game weather: Sunny • Temperature: 54 °F (12 °C) • Wind: S 3 mph
- Game attendance: 13,211
- Referee: Patrick Foy
- TV announcers (Stadium): Josh Appel (play-by-play), Patrick Russell (analyst)

Game information

First quarter

- (8:42) CLT – Keith Pearson Jr. 6 yard pass from Chris Reynolds, Jonathan Cruz kick (Drive: 16 plays, 75 yards, 6:18; Charlotte 7–0)
- (5:14) MRSH – Rasheen Ali 25 yard rush, Shane Ciucci kick (Drive: 10 plays, 75 yards, 3:28; Tied 7–7)

Second quarter

- (12:12) MRSH – Rasheen Ali 5 yard rush, Shane Ciucci kick (Drive: 13 plays, 73 yards, 4:28; Marshall 14–7)
- (4:13) CLT – Cameron Dollar 21 yard pass from Chris Reynolds, Jonathan Cruz (Drive: 4 plays, 71 yards, 1:43; Tied 14–14)
- (3:26) MRSH – Corey Gammage 64 yard pass from Grant Wells, Shane Ciucci kick (Drive: 3 plays, 75 yards, 0:40; Marshall 21–14)

Third quarter

- (11:49) MRSH – Xavier Gaines 22 yard pass from Grant Wells, Shane Ciucci kick (Drive: 9 plays, 79 yards, 3:11; Marshall 28–14)
- (7:45) MRSH – Sheldon Evans 15 yard rush, Shane Ciucci kick (Drive: 5 plays, 95 yards, 2:21; Marshall 35–14)
- (2:07) MRSH – Rasheen Ali 4 yard rush, Shane Ciucci kick (Drive: 8 plays, 81 yards, 3:52; Marshall 42–14)

Fourth quarter

- (11:37) CLT – Cameron Dollar 4 yard pass from Chris Reynolds, Jonathan Cruz (Drive: 16 plays, 69 yards, 5:24; Marshall 42–21)
- (8:36) MRSH – Sheldon Evans 25 yard rush, Shane Ciucci kick (Drive: 5 plays, 48 yards, 3:01; Marshall 49–21)
- (4:33) CLT – ChaVon McEachern 5 yard pass from James Foster, Jonathan Cruz (Drive: 9 plays, 73 yards, 3:57; Marshall 49–28)

Statistics	MRSH	CLT
First downs	29	23
Plays–yards	72–588	73–364
Rushes–yards	44–321	32–119
Passing yards	267	245
Passing: comp–att–int	21–28–0	25–41–1
Time of possession	29:03	30:57

Team	Category	Player	Statistics
Marshall	Passing	Grant Wells	21/28, 267 yards, 2 TD
Marshall	Rushing	Rasheen Ali	23 carries, 203 yards, 3 TD
Marshall	Receiving	Corey Gammage	3 receptions, 78 yards, 1 TD
Charlotte	Passing	Chris Reynolds	19/34, 176 yards, 3 TD, 1 INT
Charlotte	Rushing	Shadrick Byrd	14 carries, 61 yards
Charlotte	Receiving	Grant DuBose	6 receptions, 70 yards

=== Western Kentucky ===
Game Twelve – Western Kentucky Hilltoppers (7–4) at Marshall Thundering Herd (7–4)

Quarter	1	2	3	4	Total
Hilltoppers	0	6	23	24	53
Thundering Herd	7	7	0	7	21

at Joan C. Edwards Stadium • Huntington, West Virginia

- Date: Saturday, November 27, 2021
- Game time: 3:30 p.m. EST
- Game weather: Sunny • Temperature: 44 °F (7 °C) • Wind: N/A
- Game attendance: 19,134
- Referee: Jonathan Noli
- TV announcers (CBSSN): Alex Del Barrio (play-by-play), Sed Bonner (analyst)

Game information

First quarter

- (7:01) MRSH – Grant Wells 1 yard rush, Shane Ciucci kick (Drive: 15 plays, 79 yards, 6:58; Marshall 7–0)

Second quarter

- (14:22) MRSH – Devin Miller 3 yard pass from Grant Wells, Shane Ciucci kick (Drive: 9 plays, 57 yards, 3:57; Marshall 14–0)
- (8:05) WKU – Brayden Narveson 41 yard field goal (Drive: 6 plays, 25 yards, 1:56; Marshall 14–3)
- (2:48) WKU – Brayden Narveson 46 yard field goal (Drive: 10 plays, 27 yards, 3:12; Marshall 14–6)

Third quarter

- (13:41) WKU – Daewood Davis 47 yard pass from Bailey Zappe, Brayden Narveson kick (Drive: 2 plays, 58 yards, 0:23; Marshall 14–13)
- (9:10) WKU – Corley Malachi 14 yard pass from Bailey Zappe, Brayden Narveson kick (Drive: 9 plays, 78 yards, 2:21; Western Kentucky 20–14)
- (7:28) WKU – Daewood Davis 50 yard pass from Bailey Zappe, two-point conversion failed (Drive: 1 play, 50 yards, 0:09; Western Kentucky 26–14)
- (3:25) WKU – Brayden Narveson 53 yard field goal (Drive: 10 plays, 37 yards, 3:30; Western Kentcuky 29–14)

Fourth quarter

- (14:18) WKU – Dalvin Smith 8 yard pass from Bailey Zappe, Brayden Narveson kick (Drive: 9 plays, 78 yards, 3:30; Western Kentucky 36–14)
- (12:23) MRSH – Shadeed Ahmed 41 yard pass from Luke Zban, Shane Ciucci kick (Drive: 6 plays, 75 yards, 1:55; Western Kentucky 36–21)
- (12:16) WKU – A.J. Brathwaite 43 yard kickoff return, Brayden Narveson kick (Western Kentucky 43–21)
- (1:12) WKU – Brayden Narveson 39 yard field goal (Drive: 11 plays, 21 yards, 7:18; Western Kentcuky 46–21)
- (0:53) WKU – Davion Williams 45 yard interception return, Brayden Narveson kick (Western Kentucky 53–21)

Statistics	WKU	MRSH
First downs	25	20
Plays–yards	82–485	79–325
Rushes–yards	34–157	40–126
Passing yards	328	199
Passing: comp–att–int	25–48–0	26–39–1
Time of possession	30:34	29:26

Team	Category	Player	Statistics
Western Kentucky	Passing	Bailey Zappe	25/48, 328 yards, 4 TD
Western Kentucky	Rushing	Noah Whittington	14 carries, 69 yards
Western Kentucky	Receiving	Daewood Davis	3 receptions, 105 yards, 2 TD
Marshall	Passing	Luke Zban	16/25, 123 yards, 1 TD, 1 INT
Marshall	Rushing	Rasheen Ali	24 carries, 99 yards
Marshall	Receiving	Corey Gammage	7 receptions, 44 yards

=== vs Louisiana ===
New Orleans Bowl – No. 23 Louisiana Ragin' Cajuns (12–1) vs Marshall Thundering Herd (7–5)

Quarter	1	2	3	4	Total
No. 23 Ragin' Cajuns	10	6	0	20	36
Thundering Herd	7	7	7	0	21

at Caesars Superdome • New Orleans, Louisiana

- Date: Saturday, December 18, 2021
- Game time: 9:15 p.m. EST (8:15 p.m. local CST)
- Game attendance: 21,642
- Referee: Mike Cutton
- TV announcers (ESPN): Anish Shroff (play-by-play), Mike Golic Jr. (analyst), and Taylor McGregor (sideline)

Game information

First quarter

- 9:26 UL – Kyren Lacy 9-yard pass from Levi Lewis, Nate Snyder kick good. Drive: 13 plays, 81 yards, 5:34. Louisiana 7–0
- 1:29 UL – Nate Snyder 42-yard field goal. Drive: 13 plays, 40 yards, 6:35. Louisiana 10–0
- 0:50 MRSH – Rasheen Ali 63-yard run, Shane Ciucci kick good. Drive: 3 plays, 75 yards, 0:39. Louisiana 10–7

Second quarter

- 10:32 MRSH – Rasheen Ali 14-yard run, Shane Ciucci kick good. Drive: 3 plays, 58 yards, 1:10. Marshall 14–10
- 1:28 UL – Nate Snyder 25-yard field goal. Drive: 8 plays, 75 yards, 4:27. Marshall 14–13
- 0:00 UL – Nate Snyder 24-yard field goal. Drive: 5 plays, 39 yards, 0:43. Louisiana 16–14

Third quarter

- 1:01 MRSH – Rasheen Ali 9-yard run, Shane Ciucci kick good. Drive: 13 plays, 63 yards, 4:20. Marshall 21–16

Fourth quarter

- 8:20 UL – Emani Bailey 4-yard run, conversion pass failed. Drive: 8 plays, 68 yards, 3:34. Louisiana 22–21
- 3:54 UL – Montrell Johnson Jr. 3-yard run, Nate Snyder kick good. Drive: 6 plays, 73 yards, 2:34. Louisiana 29–21
- 1:41 UL – Emani Bailey 2-yard run, Nate Snyder kick good. Drive: 6 plays, 52 yards, 1:45. Louisiana 36–21

Statistics	UL	MRSH
First downs	22	13
Plays–yards	83–498	56–278
Rushes–yards	51–220	30–179
Passing yards	278	99
Passing: comp–att–int	20–32–0	15–26–2
Time of possession	37:26	22:34

Team	Category	Player	Statistics
Louisiana	Passing	Levi Lewis	19/31, 270 yards, TD
Louisiana	Rushing	Emani Bailey	17 carries, 94 yards, 2 TD
Louisiana	Receiving	Michael Jefferson	3 receptions, 108 yards
Marshall	Passing	Grant Wells	15/26, 99 yards, INT
Marshall	Rushing	Rasheen Ali	20 carries, 160 yards, 3 TD
Marshall	Receiving	Corey Gammage	9 receptions, 50 yards

== Players drafted into the NFL ==
Round	Pick	Player	Position	NFL Club
7	259	Nazeeh Johnson	S	Kansas City Chiefs
