= Gordon Marshall (cricketer) =

Cricketer

Gordon Alex Marshall (born 12 March 1935) is a former cricketer who played first-class cricket in four matches for Warwickshire between 1961 and 1963. Marshall was born in Birmingham.

== Background ==
Marshall, a lower-order right-handed batsman and a right-arm fast-medium opening bowler, appeared in games against the university sides across three seasons. His greatest success came in his second match of the 1961 season. Against Cambridge University, he scored an unbeaten 18 and put on 58 for the 10th wicket with Ray Carter, whose 37 was the highest of his own career; Marshall then took five wickets for just 22 runs in 20 overs in the Cambridge first innings. He achieved very little in his other games and was not given an opportunity in a County Championship match.
