= Allen Wright (journalist) =

Scottish arts critic and journalist

Allen Wright (22 February 1932 - 16 November 1997) was a Scottish arts critic and journalist. He was, for nearly 30 years, arts editor of The Scotsman newspaper, and was regarded as a champion of young critics. Wright first began to review at the annual Edinburgh Festival Fringe in 1957 and today, the young writers' award at the Fringe is named the Allen Wright Award in his honour, having been established in 1998. He was 'arguably Scotland's most respected arts journalist' of the era and a 'major figure in the Scottish cultural scene'.

== Career ==
Wright worked his entire life at The Scotsman. He joined the paper straight from school as a 'tube boy', a messenger who delivered editorial copy via a vacuum tube system. He graduated to reporting, with film reviewing as a sideline, then became drama critic in succession to Ronald Mavor and deputy news editor. In 1964, the paper's editor Alastair Dunnet made him the Scotsman's first arts editor. He continued in much the same way under Dunnett's successor, Eric Mackay, but he found some of the demands of later editors harder to comply with. Nevertheless, he remained in the role until suffering a stroke in 1993.

In the early years of his time with the Scotsman, the paper attempted to review every production at the Fringe. The then deputy editor of the Scotsman, Arnold Kemp, considered Allen's organisation of the paper's Fringe coverage his greatest single achievement.

Wright was not an admirer of all aspects of the contemporary theatre of the day, especially what he regarded as 'cultish' productions. For example, he found an all-male production of Hamlet by Glasgow's Citizens' Theatre distasteful. However, his reviews were commended for being 'clear, informative, and judicious' and he was 'able to acknowledge his blind spots... and sought to neutralise them'.

John Fowler of rival newspaper The Herald referred to him as 'a man of grace and sterling worth'. He enjoyed whisky and golf.

== Death ==
In 1993, he was incapacitated by a stroke, shortly after returning from a holiday in France after that year's Fringe. This left him in a wheelchair and unable to converse. He died on 16 November 1997, survived by his wife Eleanor and three daughters.

== Bibliography ==
- Dale, Michael (1988). Sore Throats and Overdrafts: An illustrated story of the Edinburgh Festival Fringe. Edinburgh: Precedent Publications. ISBN 0-9512-6502-4.
