= John Fox (cricketer, born 1929) =

English cricketer

Personal information
- Full name: John George Fox
- Born: 22 July 1929; Norton, County Durham, England
- Died: 2 August 2016 (aged 87); Devon, England
- Batting: Right-handed
- Role: Wicket-keeper

Domestic team information
- Years: Team
- 1968–1969: Devon
- 1964: Durham
- 1959–1961: Warwickshire
- 1950–1958: Durham

Career statistics
Competition	First-class
Matches	43
Runs scored	515
Batting average	10.72
100s/50s	–/1
Top score	52
Balls bowled	3
Wickets	–
Bowling average	–
5 wickets in innings	–
10 wickets in match	–
Best bowling	–
Catches/stumpings	91/14
- Source: Cricinfo, 16 April 2011

John George "Jackie" Fox (22 July 1929 – 2 August 2016) was an English cricketer. Fox was a right-handed batsman and wicket-keeper. He was born in Norton, County Durham.

Fox made his debut in county cricket for Durham in the 1950 Minor Counties Championship against the Lancashire Second XI. He played Minor counties cricket for Durham from 1950 to 1958. Following his final Minor Counties Championship appearance for Durham in 1958 against the Warwickshire Second XI, he proceeded to join Warwickshire in 1959. He made his first-class debut against Northamptonshire.

Fox played first-class cricket for Warwickshire from 1959 to 1961, playing 43 first-class matches. In these, he scored 515 runs at a batting average of 10.72, with a single half century highest score of 52 against the 1959 Indian touring team. Behind the stumps he took 91 catches and made 14 stumpings.

He lost his place in the Warwickshire side to A. C. Smith in the second half of the 1960 season after Smith had finished at Oxford University, and though he played a few more games in 1961 he left Warwickshire at the end of that season. He did not return to county cricket until 1964, when he played again for Durham in the Minor Counties Championship, playing twice for the county that season against the Warwickshire Second XI and Staffordshire. He later played Minor Counties Championship cricket for Devon in 1968 and 1969.

He died in 2016.
