= Albert D. Wright =

American Union Army soldier

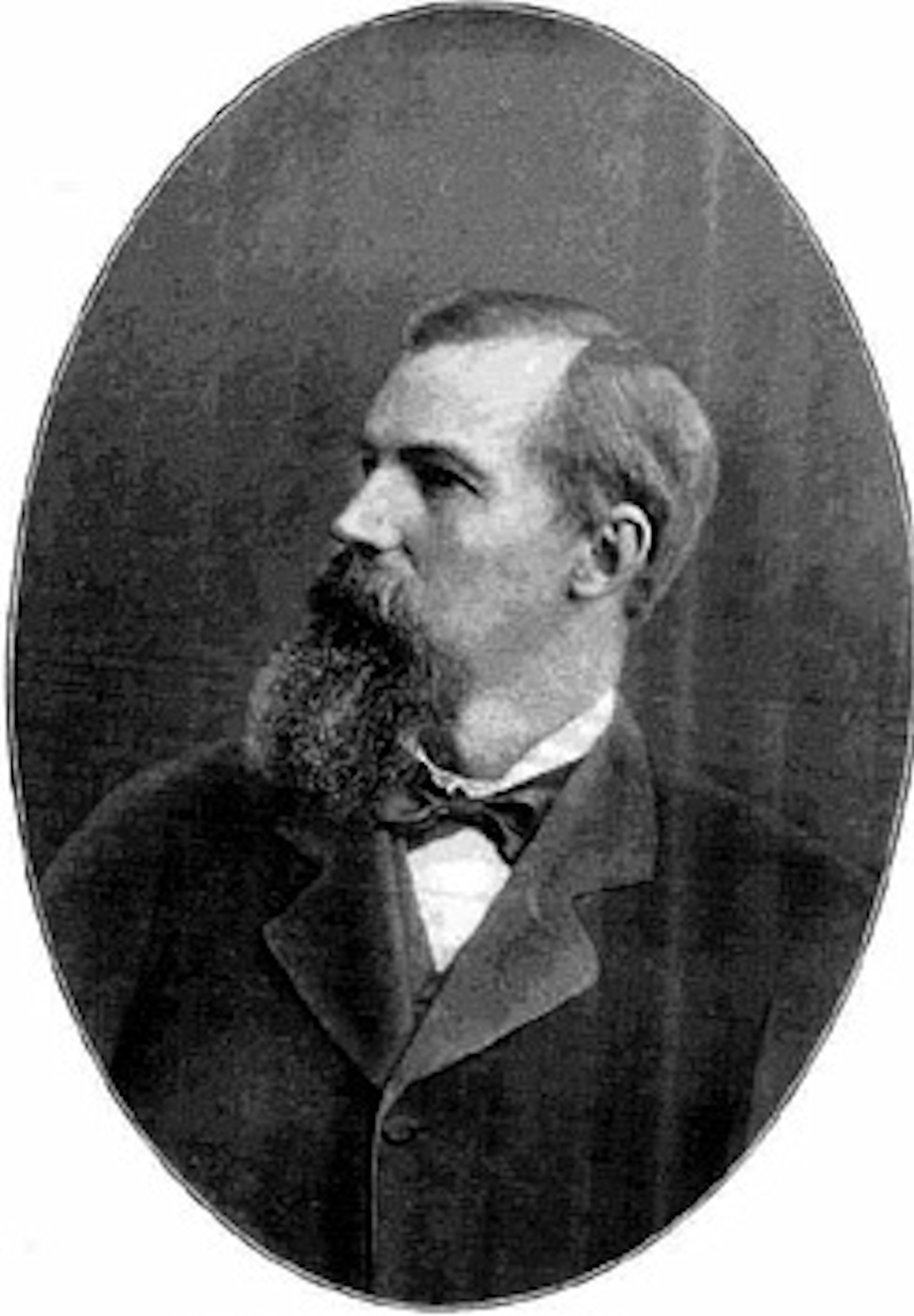
Albert D. Wright

Albert D. Wright (December 10, 1842 – February 15, 1926) was an American soldier who fought with the Union Army in the American Civil War and was awarded the Medal of Honor.

== Biography ==
Wright enlisted in the 149th Pennsylvania Regiment as a sergeant on 15 August 1862. On 20 April 1864, Wright was promoted to captain and placed in command of Company G, 43rd U.S. Colored Infantry. He was awarded the Medal of Honor for his actions at the Siege of Petersburg.

After the war, Captain Wright became a Companion of the District of Columbia Commandery of the Military Order of the Loyal Legion of the United States.

He was later buried at Greenwood Cemetery in Eustis, Florida, and his medal placed on exhibit at Atlanta History Center.

== Medal of Honor citation ==
For extraordinary heroism on 30 July 1864, in action at Petersburg, Virginia. Captain Wright advanced beyond the enemy's lines, capturing a stand of colors and its color guard; was severely wounded.

Date issued: May 1, 1893
