= Gerrit Prince =

American football player (born 1997)

Profile
- Position: Tight end

Personal information
- Born: August 25, 1997 (age 29); Shawnee, Kansas, U.S.
- Listed height: 6 ft 5 in (1.96 m)
- Listed weight: 240 lb (109 kg)

Career information
- High school: Shawnee Mission Northwest (Shawnee, Kansas)
- College: Butler CC (2016–2017); UAB (2018–2021)
- NFL draft: 2022: undrafted

Career history
- Jacksonville Jaguars (2022–2023)*; Kansas City Chiefs (2023–2024)*
- * Offseason or practice squad member only

Awards and highlights
- Super Bowl champion (LVIII); Second-team All-C-USA (2021)
- Stats at Pro Football Reference

Gerrit Prince (born August 25, 1997) is an American football tight end. He played college football at UAB.

== Early life ==
Prince was born in Shawnee, Kansas and attended Shawnee Mission Northwest High School. He was an unranked wide receiver recruit and committed to Butler Community College.

== College career ==
At Butler, Prince played in every game for the 2017 season and recorded a total of 566 receiving yards and 11 receiving touchdowns.

In his first season at UAB in 2018, Prince played in four games and was redshirted. He played in all 14 games in the 2019 season and started in one game while accumulating 23 yards and a touchdown. He played in eight games and started in six in the 2020 season while also being an honorable mention on the All-Conference USA Team. In the 2021 season, Prince played in all 13 games and started in 11. By the end of the season he had caught 36 receptions for 699 yards and 10 touchdowns, earning him the Conference USA Offensive Player of the Week, the John Mackey Tight End of the Week, and the Second Team All-Conference USA honors.

== Professional career ==
Pre-draft measurables
Height	Weight	Arm length	Hand span	40-yard dash	10-yard split	20-yard split	20-yard shuttle	Three-cone drill	Vertical jump	Broad jump	Bench press
6 ft 4 1/2 in (1.94 m)	255 lb (116 kg)	34 in (0.86 m)	9 5/8 in (0.24 m)	4.41 s	1.71 s	2.54 s	4.46 s	7.25 s	38.5 in (0.98 m)	10 ft 2 in (3.10 m)	32 reps
All values from Pro Day

=== Jacksonville Jaguars ===
On May 2, 2022, Prince was signed to the Jacksonville Jaguars as an undrafted free agent after going unselected in the 2022 NFL draft. On January 23, 2023, Prince signed a reserve/future contract with the Jaguars.

Prince was released as part of final roster cuts on August 29, 2023.

=== Kansas City Chiefs ===
On August 30, 2023, Prince was signed to the practice squad of the Kansas City Chiefs. Prince became a Super Bowl champion when the Chiefs defeated the San Francisco 49ers in Super Bowl LVIII. He was waived on July 21, 2024.
