= Bert Wright (cricketer) =

Australian cricketer

Personal information
- Born: 2 December 1926; Melbourne, Australia
- Died: 20 November 1994 (aged 67); Beaumaris, Victoria, Australia

Domestic team information
- Years: Team
- 1950-1951: Victoria
- Source: Cricinfo, 2 December 2015

Bert Wright (2 December 1926 – 20 November 1994) was an Australian cricketer. He played three first-class cricket matches for Victoria between 1950 and 1951. He also played for Footscray Cricket Club and was captain of Ivanhoe.

== See also ==
- List of Victoria first-class cricketers
