= Alex Wright (American football) =

American football player (born 2000)

No. 91 – Cleveland Browns
- Position: Defensive end
- Roster status: Injured reserve

Personal information
- Born: September 5, 2000 (age 26); Elba, Alabama, U.S.
- Listed height: 6 ft 5 in (1.96 m)
- Listed weight: 267 lb (121 kg)

Career information
- High school: Elba
- College: UAB (2019–2021)
- NFL draft: 2022: 3rd round, 78th overall pick

Career history
- Cleveland Browns (2022–present)

Awards and highlights
- Second-team All-C-USA (2021)

Career NFL statistics as of 2025
- Total tackles: 98
- Sacks: 11.5
- Forced fumbles: 3
- Fumble recoveries: 2
- Pass deflections: 8
- Stats at Pro Football Reference

Alexander Wright (born September 5, 2000) is an American professional football defensive end for the Cleveland Browns of the National Football League (NFL). He played college football for the UAB Blazers.

== Early life ==
Wright grew up in Elba, Alabama and attended Elba High School. He was named second-team All-State as a senior after recording 63 tackles, 17 tackles for loss, and 6 sacks. Wright committed to play college football at UAB over offers from Wake Forest, Duke, Tulane, Virginia, and Louisville.

== College career ==
Wright was named to the Conference USA All-Freshman team after recording 28 tackles, 8.5 tackles for loss, and 4.5 sacks with one forced fumble and two fumble recoveries. As a sophomore, he had 17 tackles with three tackles for loss and one sack. Wright was named second-team All-Conference USA after finishing his junior season with 46 tackles, 7.5 tackles for loss, seven sacks, and two forced fumbles. Following the end of the season, Wright declared that he would forgo his senior season and enter the 2022 NFL Draft.

== Professional career ==
Pre-draft measurables
Height	Weight	Arm length	Hand span	Wingspan	Bench press
6 ft 5 1/8 in (1.96 m)	271 lb (123 kg)	34 in (0.86 m)	9 1/4 in (0.23 m)	6 ft 10 7/8 in (2.11 m)	15 reps
All values from NFL Combine

Wright was selected by the Cleveland Browns with the 78th overall pick in the third round of the 2022 NFL draft.

Wright suffered a torn triceps in Week 4 of the 2024 season and was placed on injured reserve.

On November 20, 2025, Wright signed a three-year, $33 million contract extension with the Browns.

On August 23, 2026, Wright was placed on season–ending injured reserve after suffering a ruptured Achilles tendon.

== NFL career statistics ==
Legend
	Led the league
**Bold**	Career high

=== Regular season ===
Year	Team	Games		Tackles						Interceptions						Fumbles				
Year	Team	GP	GS	Cmb	Solo	Ast	Sck	TFL	Sfty	Int	Yds	Avg	Lng	TD	PD	FF	Fmb	FR	Yds	TD
2022	CLE	17	5	28	13	15	0.0	2	0	0	0	0.0	0	0	**5**	0	0	**1**	0	0
2023	CLE	16	1	25	16	9	5.0	6	0	0	0	0.0	0	0	2	**2**	0	**1**	0	0
2024	CLE	4	0	8	5	3	1.0	1	**1**	0	0	0.0	0	0	0	0	0	0	0	0
2025	CLE	14	9	**37**	**21**	**16**	**5.5**	**12**	0	0	0	0.0	0	0	1	1	0	0	0	0
Career		51	15	98	55	43	11.5	21	1	0	0	0.0	0	0	8	3	0	2	0	0

=== Postseason ===
Year	Team	Games		Tackles					Interceptions						Fumbles				
Year	Team	GP	GS	Cmb	Solo	Ast	Sck	TFL	Int	Yds	Avg	Lng	TD	PD	FF	Fmb	FR	Yds	TD
2023	CLE	1	0	0	0	0	0.0	0	0	0	0.0	0	0	0	0	0	0	0	0
Career		1	0	0	0	0	0.0	0	0	0	0.0	0	0	0	0	0	0	0	0
