= DQ Thomas =

American football player (born 1998)

Profile
- Position: Linebacker

Personal information
- Born: December 12, 1998 (age 27); Oxford, Mississippi, U.S.
- Listed height: 6 ft 2 in (1.88 m)
- Listed weight: 215 lb (98 kg)

Career information
- High school: Oxford
- College: Middle Tennessee (2017–2021)
- NFL draft: 2022: undrafted

Career history
- New York Jets (2022)*; Green Bay Packers (2022)*; Hamilton Tiger-Cats (2024)
- * Offseason or practice squad member only

Awards and highlights
- Second-team All-C-USA (2021)
- Stats at Pro Football Reference
- Stats at CFL.ca

DQuarius D'Juan Thomas (born December 12, 1998) is an American professional football linebacker. He most recently played for the Hamilton Tiger-Cats of the Canadian Football League (CFL). He played college football at Middle Tennessee where he is the school's all-time leader in tackles for loss with 53. He originally signed with the New York Jets as an undrafted free agent in 2022.

== Early life ==
Thomas played high school football for Oxford High School in Oxford, Mississippi. He lettered in football and powerlifting while also earning All-State and All-Region honors. In his senior season in 2016, he made 115 tackles, nine tackles for loss, 1.5 sacks, four hurries, and five interceptions at safety.

== College career ==
Thomas played in all thirteen games and made one start. He finished the season with nine tackles, two sacks, and 2.5 tackles for loss, having his best game against FIU where he made three tackles alongside one sack, 1.5 tackles for loss, and a forced fumble. He made his only start of the season against Charlotte.

During Thomas' sophomore season, he played in all fourteen games with twelve starts. He ranked tied for third on his team for tackles with seventy while also having a team-high 14.5 tackles for loss and sacks with eight. He had his best game of the season in a 27–7 win over UAB where he had seven total tackles, three tackles for loss, two sacks, and a forced fumble, causing him to also be named the C-USA Defensive Player of the Week.

He started twelve of the twelve games he played during his junior season. He was second on the team with a career-high 74 tackles and a team-leading twelve tackles for loss. He also tallied two sacks, two forced fumbles, and a single pass breakup. He led the team in tackles in their game against Michigan, with ten.

He started all nine games. He ranked third on the team with 67 tackles, seven tackles for loss, 3.5 sacks, and two forced fumbles. He led the team's linebackers in snaps with 660. He had a career-high in tackles in a game with twelve against North Texas.

He started ten of twelve games, finishing third on the team with 89 tackles, a career-high seventeen tackles for loss, five sacks, two interceptions, seven hurries, and a fumble forced and recovery. He finished ninth nationally in tackles for loss per game with 1.4. He was voted a team captain for the season along with being voted Second-Team All-C-USA. After missing the team's game against UTSA he returned against Charlotte and had four tackles and two hurries to earn the team's defensive player of the game award. He made his first career interception against Liberty. He earned his second career C-USA Defensive Player of the Week after having ten tackles, two tackles for loss, and a pick-6 against Southern Miss. He was named as the Bahamas Bowl Defensive MVP after having eight tackles, 1.5 tackles for loss, and a pass breakup in the 31–24 win over Toledo.

=== Statistics ===
He finished his career ranked first all-time in career tackles for loss with 53 and third all-time in sacks with 20.5.

Year	Team	Games		Defense								
Year	Team	GP	GS	Solo	Ast	TOT	TFL	Sack	Int	PD	FF	FR
2017	Middle Tennessee	13	1	7	2	9	2.5	2	0	0	1	0
2018	Middle Tennessee	14	12	43	27	70	14.5	8	0	3	2	2
2019	Middle Tennessee	12	12	47	27	74	12	2	0	1	2	0
2020	Middle Tennessee	9	9	29	38	67	7	3.5	0	0	2	0
2021	Middle Tennessee	12	10	54	35	89	17	5	2	5	1	1
Career		60	44	180	129	309	53	20.5	2	9	8	3

== Professional career ==
After going undrafted in the 2022 NFL draft, Thomas signed with the New York Jets on May 6, 2022. He was released on August 30, 2022, and then spent a week on the practice squad before being released again.

On September 20, 2022, Thomas signed with the Green Bay Packers' practice squad. On January 6, 2023, he suffered a broken femur during practice. He did not sign a futures contract with the team and his contract expired when free agency started.

On April 25, 2024, Thomas signed with the Hamilton Tiger-Cats of the Canadian Football League (CFL). He played in 11 games where he had six defensive tackles and three special teams tackles. He was with the team in training camp in 2025, but was part of the final cuts on June 1, 2025.
