= Bertie Wright (cricketer) =

English cricketer

Bertie Wright was an English cricketer who played for Northamptonshire from 1919 to 1922. He appeared in five first-class matches as a righthanded batsman who bowled right arm medium pace. One of three brothers who played cricket, Wright was born in Kettering on 7 February 1897 and died there on 2 April 1955. He scored 28 runs with a highest score of 12 and took six wickets with a best performance of two for 11.
