= Herbert Harnell Wright =

American educator

Herbert Harnell Wright (1848 - 1916) was an educator in the United States. He served as dean and acting president of Fisk University. He graduated from Oberlin.

He served as dean of Fisk Freed Colored School which became Fisk University. He was a professor at the university.

He wrote about "Jubilee Songs at Chapel Exercises". He was an advocate of Christian values and was a leader of the White Cross League which advocated sexual purity. He was a director of Mercy Hospital in Nashville.

He advertised a house for sale by the school.
