= Spencer Burford =

American football player (born 2000)

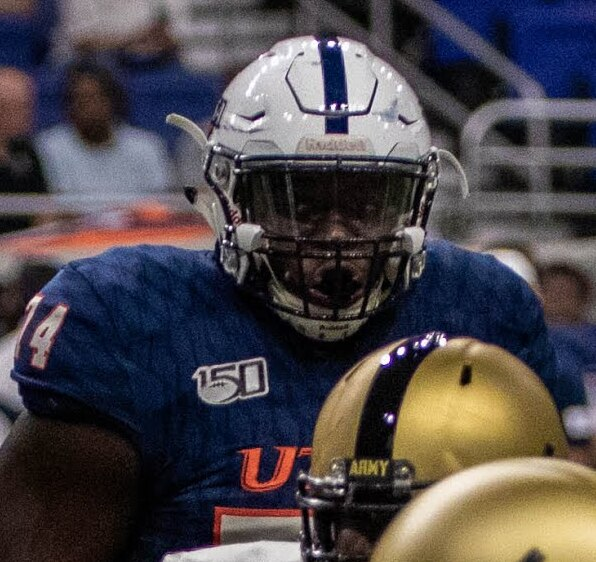
- Burford with UTSA in 2019

No. 70 – Las Vegas Raiders
- Position: Guard
- Roster status: Active

Personal information
- Born: July 19, 2000 (age 26); San Antonio, Texas, U.S.
- Listed height: 6 ft 4 in (1.93 m)
- Listed weight: 300 lb (136 kg)

Career information
- High school: Wagner (San Antonio)
- College: UTSA (2018–2021)
- NFL draft: 2022: 4th round, 134th overall pick

Career history
- San Francisco 49ers (2022–2025); Las Vegas Raiders (2026–present)

Awards and highlights
- First-team All-Conference USA (2021); Second-team All-Conference USA (2020)

Career NFL statistics as of 2025
- Games played: 56
- Games started: 38
- Stats at Pro Football Reference

Spencer Burford (born July 19, 2000) is an American professional football guard for the Las Vegas Raiders of the National Football League (NFL). He played college football for the UTSA Roadrunners. He was selected by the San Francisco 49ers in the fourth round of the 2022 NFL draft.

== Professional career ==
Pre-draft measurables
Height	Weight	Arm length	Hand span	Wingspan	40-yard dash	10-yard split	20-yard split	20-yard shuttle	Vertical jump	Broad jump	Bench press
6 ft 4 1/8 in (1.93 m)	304 lb (138 kg)	34 3/4 in (0.88 m)	9 1/2 in (0.24 m)	6 ft 10 in (2.08 m)	5.19 s	1.80 s	2.99 s	4.73 s	29.0 in (0.74 m)	8 ft 11 in (2.72 m)	25 reps
All values from NFL Combine/Pro Day

=== San Francisco 49ers ===
Burford was selected by the San Francisco 49ers in the fourth round, 134th overall, of the 2022 NFL draft. As a rookie, he appeared in and started 16 games.

On September 20, 2025, Burford was placed on injured reserve due to a knee injury suffered in Week 2 against the New Orleans Saints. On November 1, Burford was activated from injured reserve ahead of the team's Week 9 game against the New York Giants.

=== Las Vegas Raiders ===
On March 17, 2026, the Las Vegas Raiders signed Burford to a one-year, $3.25 million contract with $1.24 million guaranteed and a signing bonus of $1.5 million.
