= Albert Wright (cricketer, born 1902) =

English cricketer

Albert Wright (11 August 1902 – 8 November 1984) was an English cricketer. He was a right-handed batsman and a right-arm fast bowler who played for Essex. He was born and died in Great Leighs.

Wright made two appearances during the 1931 County Championship, and one in 1934. He was steady, if unspectacular, with the bat, in the lower order, managing to put up decent totals around crumbling teammates up until his final game, when in his second innings, he scored just one run.

Though he bowled somewhat economically, he took no wickets during his three first-class games.
