= Roly Thompson =

English cricketer (1932–2003)

Personal information
- Full name: Roland George Thompson
- Born: 26 September 1932; Binley, Coventry, Warwickshire, England
- Died: 12 May 2003 (aged 70); Coventry, Warwickshire
- Batting: Right-handed
- Bowling: Right-arm fast-medium
- Role: Bowler

Domestic team information
- Years: Team
- 1949–62: Warwickshire
- 1952: Combined Services
- First-class debut: 11 May 1949 Warwickshire v Worcestershire
- Last First-class: 4 September 1962 Warwickshire v Somerset

Career statistics
Competition	First-class
Matches	158
Runs scored	657
Batting average	5.66
100s/50s	0/0
Top score	25*
Balls bowled	28,009
Wickets	479
Bowling average	22.75
5 wickets in innings	21
10 wickets in match	5
Best bowling	9/65
Catches/stumpings	51/–
- Source: CricketArchive, 13 January 2014

Roland George Thompson (26 September 1932 – 16 May 2003), generally known as "Roly Thompson", was an English cricketer who played first-class cricket for Warwickshire between 1949 and 1962. He was a right-arm fast-medium bowler and a right-handed tail-end batsman. He was born at Binley, Coventry, and died at Coventry.

== Cricket career ==
Thompson made his debut in first-class cricket as a 16-year-old in 1949 and the following year created something of a stir by taking five Gloucestershire wickets – the top five in the batting order, including Test players Jack Crapp and Tom Graveney – for just 16 runs in a County Championship match. In 1951, he played half a dozen games and improved his best bowling analysis in the match against Leicestershire with six wickets for 63 runs. From 1952, he was on National Service in the Royal Air Force for two years, but in the first of those seasons he played a few games for Warwickshire and against Nottinghamshire, still aged only 19, he took nine first-innings wickets for 65 runs, which were the best innings figures of his career.

Following discharge in 1954, Thompson returned to Warwickshire and was a full-time professional cricketer for the next eight seasons. Yet injury, variable form and fickle selection policies meant that in only four of those eight seasons could he be regarded as a regular first-team player, a fact much commented on in his obituary in Wisden Cricketers' Almanack. His contemporary and fellow opening bowler Jack Bannister was quoted as saying that Warwickshire "did him no favours" by preferring short-term imported players "just at a time when an extended run in the first team would have benefited club and player".

Thompson had two very good seasons: 1955, when he was awarded his county cap and took 92 wickets, and 1959, when his 97 wickets cost only 17.96 runs apiece and placed him sixth in the first-class averages at the end of the season. He did not improve on his 1952 bowling figures, but against Hampshire in 1959 he took four for 48 and eight for 94 for his best match figures of 12 for 142. Later in the same 1959 season, he took eight Gloucestershire wickets for 40 runs, bowling for 25 consecutive overs from the start of the innings.

In between those two successful seasons, however, in 1957 he played only six first-team matches and took just nine wickets. He played in three-quarters of Warwickshire's matches in the 1961 season and took 77 wickets. But at the end of that season, not guaranteed a secure place in the team, he took a job at the Lockheed automotive components factory in Leamington and rejected terms for the 1962 season. In the event, he was persuaded to return for the second half of the 1962 season to give an attack over-reliant on medium-paced bowling an extra edge, but he took only 23 wickets and that was the end of his first-class career.

Thompson was no batsman and always batted at No 10 or No 11 for Warwickshire; his highest score in first-class cricket was 25 which he reached twice, both times remaining not out.
