= Jack Bannister =

English cricketer and commentator

Personal information
- Full name: John David Bannister
- Born: 23 August 1930; Wolverhampton, England
- Died: 23 January 2016 (aged 85)
- Batting: Right-handed
- Bowling: Right-arm medium
- Role: Bowler

Domestic team information
- Years: Team
- 1950–1969: Warwickshire
- FC debut: 26 August 1950 Warwickshire v Glamorgan
- Last FC: 31 August 1968 Warwickshire v Leicestershire
- LA debut: 22 May 1963 Warwickshire v Northants
- Last LA: 6 July 1969 Warwickshire v Surrey

Career statistics
Competition	First-class	List A
Matches	374	20
Runs scored	3,142	12
Batting average	9.43	4.00
100s/50s	0/4	0/0
Top score	71	4
Balls bowled	68,633	1,148
Wickets	1,198	25
Bowling average	21.91	22.44
5 wickets in innings	53	0
10 wickets in match	6	0
Best bowling	10/41	3/14
Catches/stumpings	167	3/0
- Source: CricketArchive, 4 October 2012

John David Bannister (23 August 1930 – 23 January 2016) was an English cricket commentator and former first-class cricketer who played for Warwickshire County Cricket Club. He was, for many years, a BBC television cricket commentator and later the Talksport radio cricket correspondent.

== Early life ==
Bannister was born in Wolverhampton, Staffordshire, England and went to King Edward VI Five Ways school in Birmingham.

== Playing career ==
He played professionally on the county scene for Warwickshire as a fast-medium bowler, taking 1198 first-class wickets in a career that lasted from 1950 to 1969. Against the Combined Services cricket team for Warwickshire at the Mitchells and Butlers' Ground in Birmingham in 1959, Bannister took all 10 Services wickets in an innings for 41 runs. These remain the best bowling figures in an innings for Warwickshire.

== After cricket ==
Together with Fred Rumsey he was instrumental in setting up the Professional Cricketers' Association in 1967 which he served in various capacities for 20 years, notably in helping setup up the Professional Cricketer's Pension Scheme. Bannister worked as a bookmaker in Wolverhampton, which was taken over by his daughter as his media career took off.

=== Media career ===
He was a familiar voice on BBC TV's cricket coverage from 1984 through to 1994 firstly as a summariser then moving on to commentating in 1988. David Gower joined the team in 1994 and eventually replaced Bannister the following summer, but Bannister continued to commentate on Natwest Trophy and Sunday League games until 1999, and had a full role at the BBC's coverage of the 1999 Cricket World Cup.

In later life, he provided commentary on and summaries of England international cricket matches on Talksport.

During the 1995 South Africa vs England test match series in South Africa, he promised he would eat a newspaper if South Africa won. He eventually did, when South Africa won.

For many years he wrote the cricket column in the Birmingham Post.
