= List of Old Bedford Modernians =

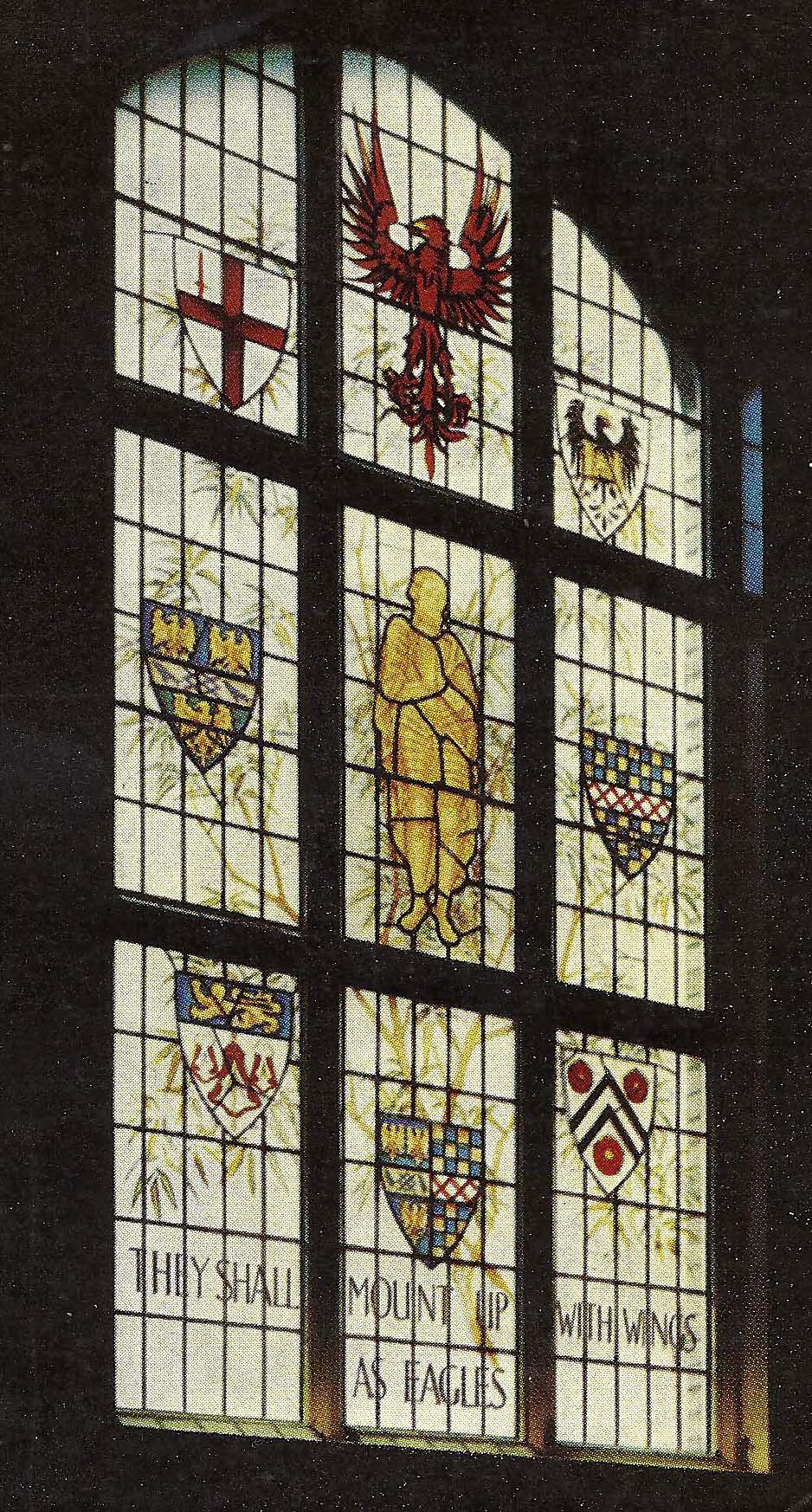
The Harpur Window, Bedford Modern School, designed by Hugh Easton with the inscription, They Shall Mount Up With Wings As Eagles

The following is a list of some notable Old Bedford Modernians who are former pupils of Bedford Modern School in Bedford, England. At the school, alumni are known as OBMs. The Old Bedford Modernians' Club was founded in 1892.

== Academia ==
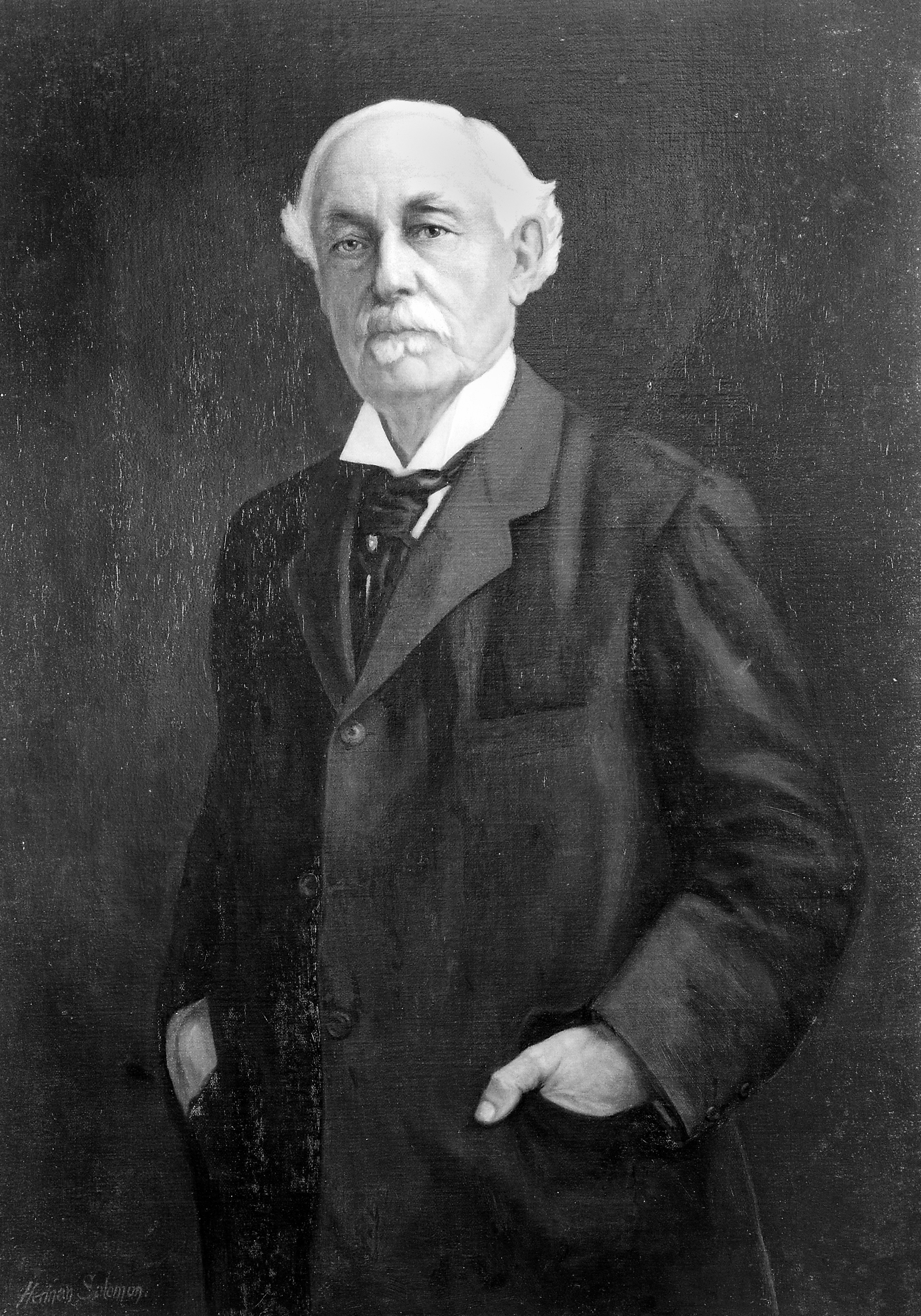
Sir William Tilden

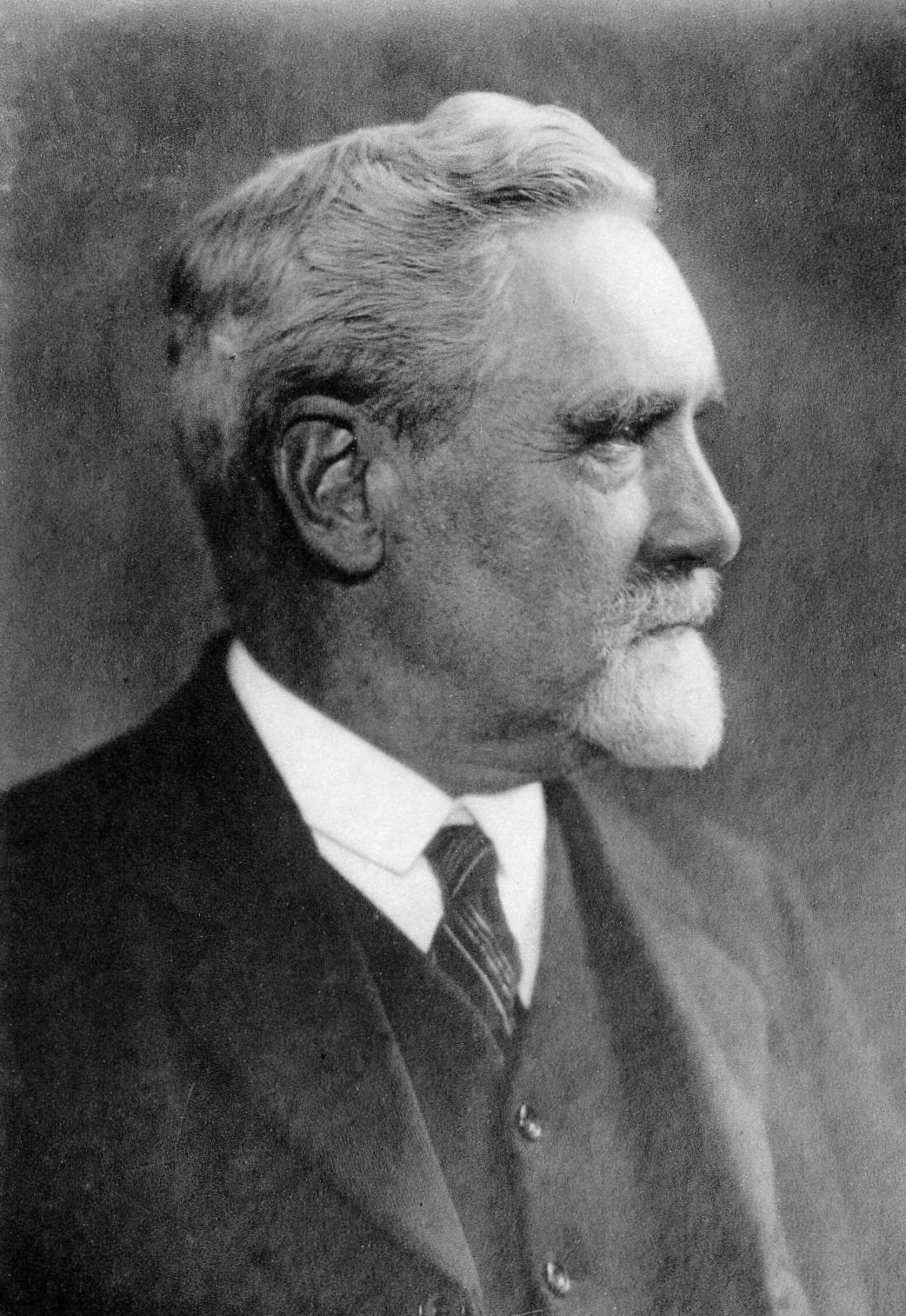
Prof. John Holland Rose

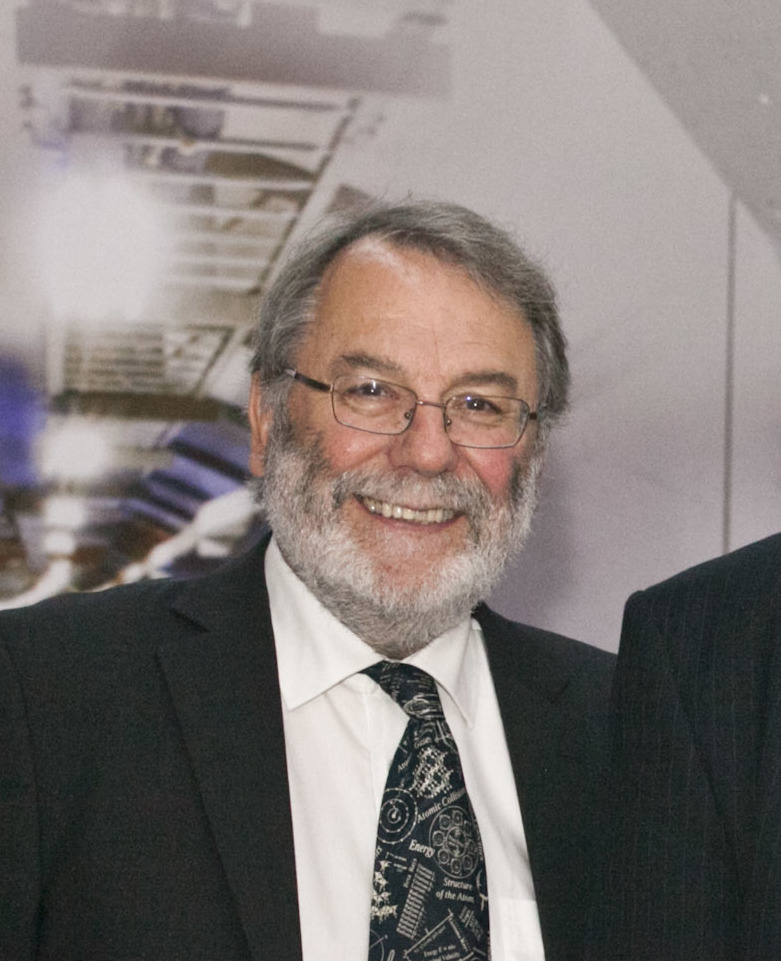
Sir Peter Knight

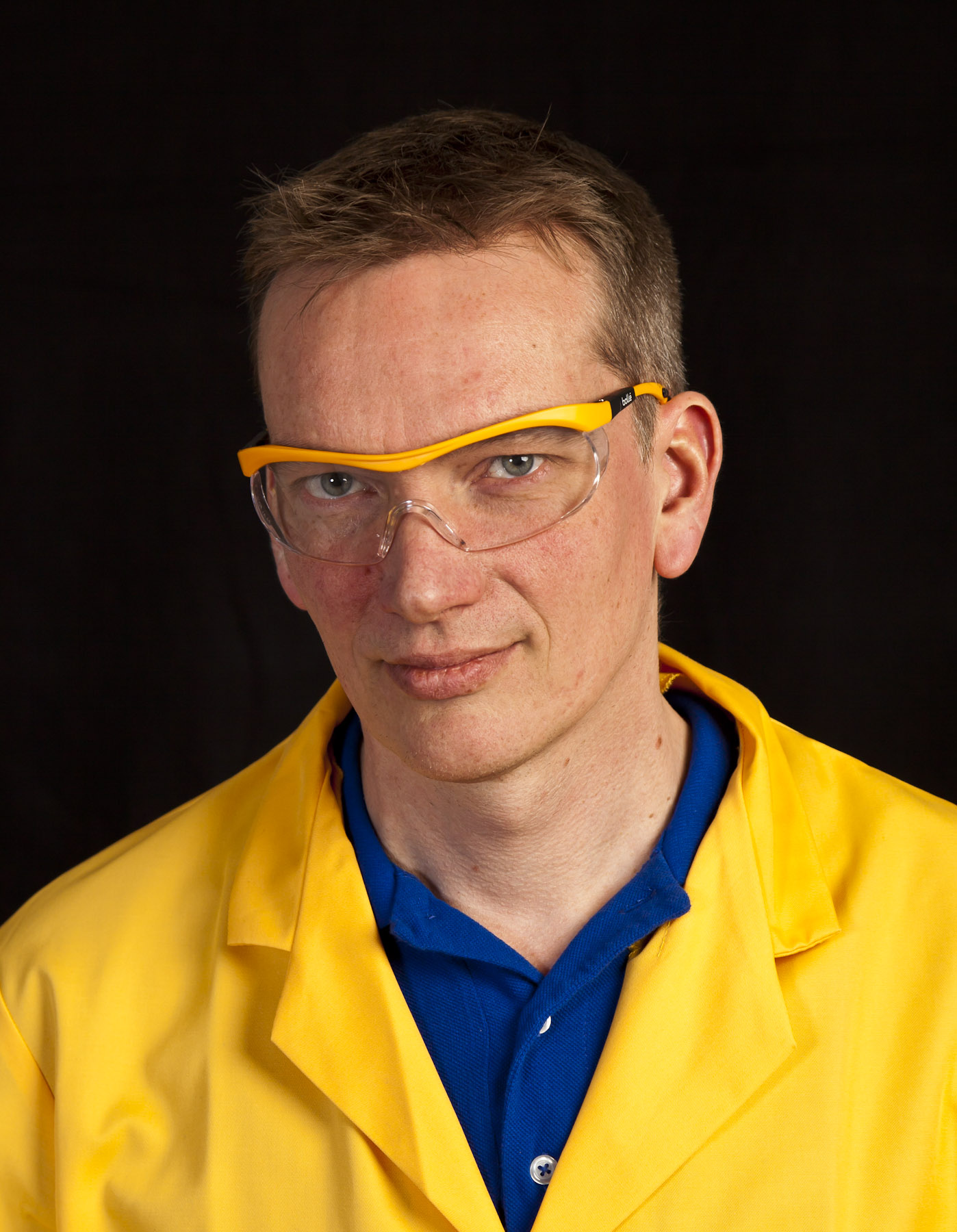
Dr. Peter Wothers

- Sir William Augustus Tilden (1842–1926), Chemist & Dean, Royal College of Science, London
- Joseph Reynolds Green (1848–1914), Professor of Botany to the Pharmaceutical Society of Great Britain
- William Hillhouse (1850–1910), first Professor of Botany at the University of Birmingham
- Edward Mann Langley (1851–1933), founded the Mathematical Gazette, created Langley's Adventitious Angles
- William Robert Bousfield (1854–1943), chemist
- John Holland Rose (1855–1942), Vere Harmsworth Professor of Imperial and Naval History, University of Cambridge
- George Charles Crick (1856–1917), geologist, authority on Cephalopoda, 1st Assistant at the Natural History Museum
- Arthur John Pressland (1865–1934), educational theorist, linguist, schoolmaster and writer
- George James Gibbs(1866–1947), astronomer, engineer, inventor and public science lecturer
- Richard John Durley (1868–1948), Professor of Mechanical Engineering at McGill University (1901–12)
- Edward Augustine Lowe Laxton (1869–1951), expert on fruit production (Laxton's Superb)
- Henry Payne (1871–1945), Professor of Engineering at the University of Melbourne
- Jannion Steele Elliott (1871–1942), ornithologist
- Eric Temple Bell (1883–1960), mathematician who specialised in number theory and formulated the Bell series
- Sir Charles Oatley (1904–1996), pioneered the development of the scanning electron microscope
- Gerald Dunning (1905–1978), pioneering medieval archaeologist, authority on Anglo-Saxon and medieval ceramics
- William Francis Grimes (1905–1988), Professor of Archaeology, University of London (1956–1973)
- Rev Francis MacCarthy Willis Bund (1906–1980), Chaplain, Dean and Fellow of Balliol College, Oxford
- D. C. Riddy (1907–1979), Controller-General of the Education Branch, Control Commission for German – British Element
- F. G. Emmison (1907–1995), archivist, author and historian
- John Roach (1920–2015), historian
- Ramsay Shearman (1924–2019), pioneer in shortwave radio and radar
- Brian Glüss (1930–2013), statistician, mathematician, systems engineer, author and expert on survivor guilt
- John Richard Anthony Pearson (born 1930), pioneer in fluid mechanics
- David John Bartholomew (1931–2017), Professor of Statistics at the LSE (1973–96)
- Philip Bean (born 1936), Professor of Criminology at Loughborough University, former President of the British Soc. of Criminology
- George Richard Pickett (1939–2024), Professor of Low Temperature Physics at Lancaster University
- Sid Gray (born 1942), Professor at the University of Sydney Business School
- Richard Britnell (1944–2013), Professor of History at Durham University
- Sir Peter Knight(born 1947), Professor of quantum optics at Imperial College London
- Stephen Wildman (born 1951), Professor of the History of Art at Lancaster University
- Roger Geoffrey Clarke (1952–2007), ornithologist, world authority on harriers and other birds of prey
- Barry H.V. Topping (born 1952), authority and author on computational mechanics
- Stephen Taylor (born 1953), Professor of Finance at Lancaster University
- Richard Charles Murray Janko (born 1955), Professor of Classical Studies at the University of Michigan
- Brian Derby (born 1956), Professor of Materials science at Manchester University
- Gavin D'Costa (born 1958), Professor in Catholic Theology at the University of Bristol
- Tom Inns (born 1965), Director of Glasgow School of Art (2013–2018)
- Nick Groom (born 1966), Professor of English Literature at the University of Macau and author
- Tony Claydon (born 1967), Professor of Early Modern History at Bangor University, Wales
- Peter Wothers (born 1969), chemist and Fellow of St Catharine's College, Cambridge
- Ben McFarlane (born 1976), Professor of English Law at the University of Oxford

== Actors, directors and entertainers ==
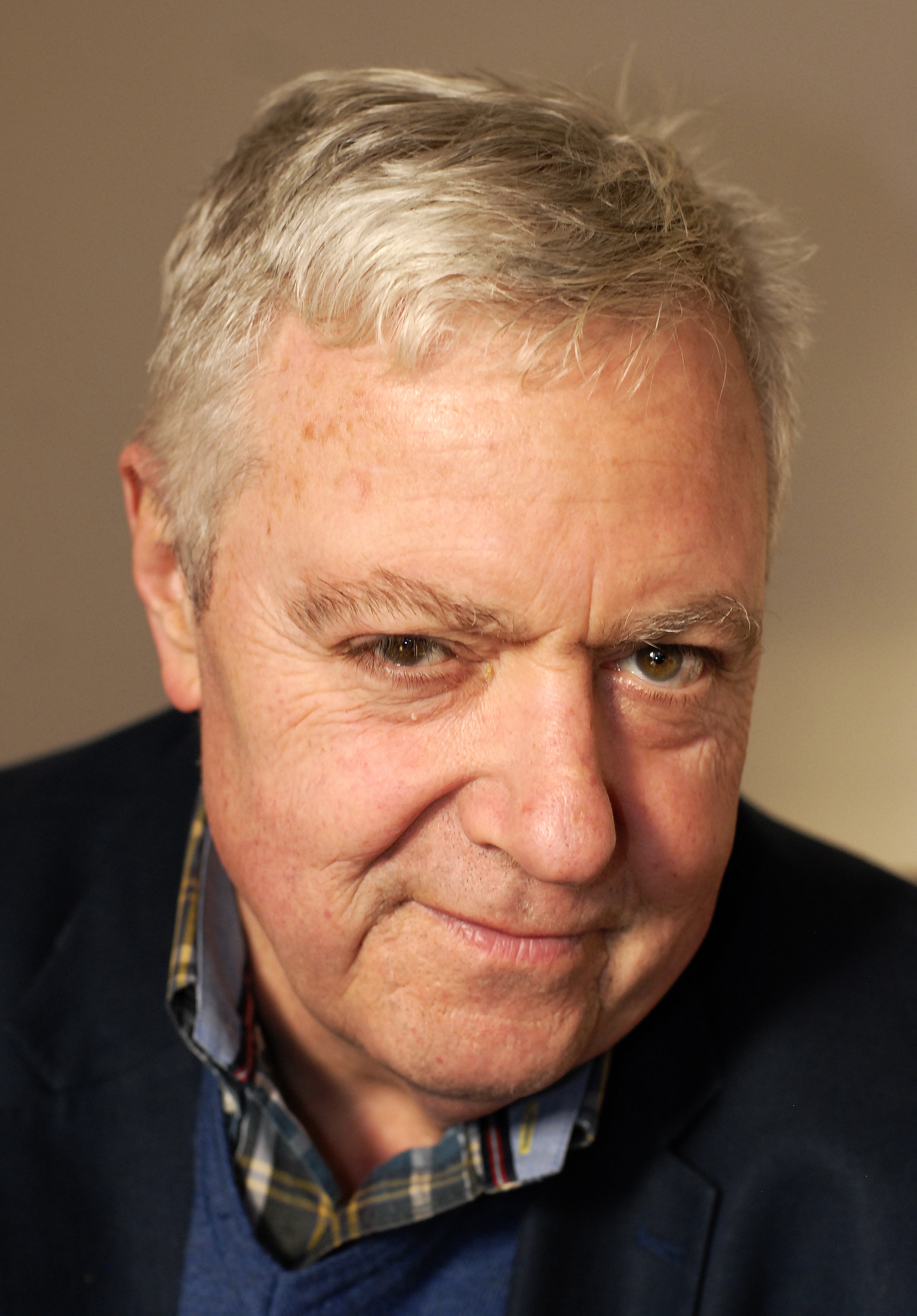
John Sessions

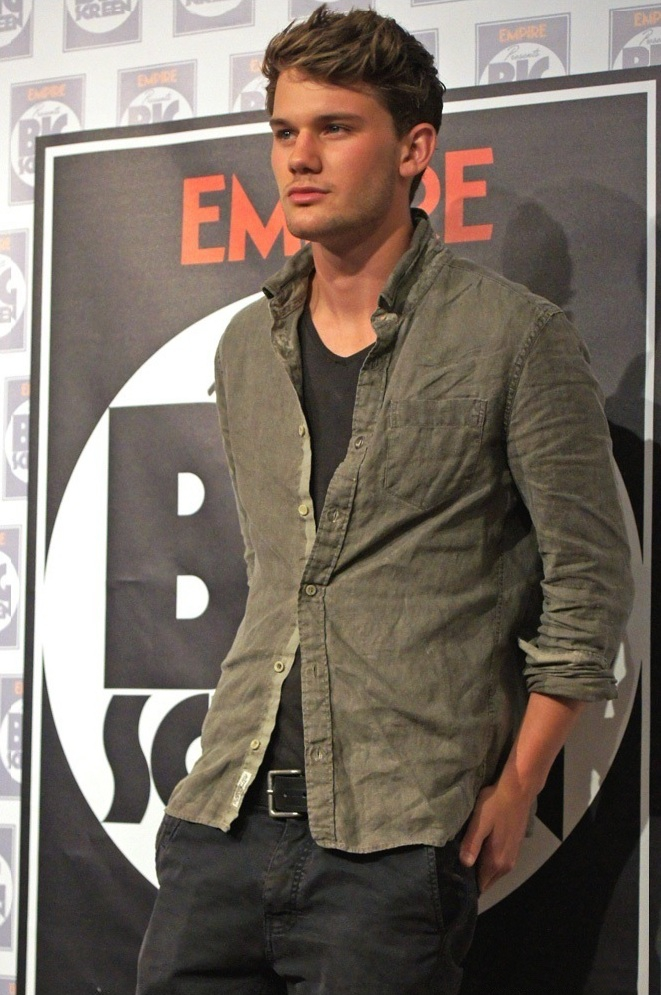
Jeremy Irvine

- E. E. Blake (1879–1961), pioneering exhibitor of motion pictures and owner of cinemas
- Harrish Ingraham (1881–?), Hollywood film director, writer and actor in the era of silent movies
- Gillie Potter (1887–1975), comedian and broadcaster
- Reginald Berkeley (1890–1935), playwright and screenwriter in Hollywood (Cavalcade, The World Moves On)
- Robert Luff (1914–2009), theatrical agent and producer (The Black and White Minstrel Show)
- Derek Scott (1921–2006), double act (with Terry-Thomas and Tony Hancock) and music director (The Muppet Show)
- David Tringham (1935–2022), film director (Lawrence of Arabia, Highlander, Robin Hood: Prince of Thieves)
- Hugh Armstrong (1944-2016), actor (How to Get Ahead in Advertising, Death Line)
- David Firth (born 1945), actor (Casualty, Midsomer Murders), screenwriter (Home James!), singer (original cast of Phantom of the Opera)
- John Sessions (1953–2020), actor (Gangs of New York, The Iron Lady, Filth), comedian and broadcaster (QI)
- Julian Hector (born 1958), head of the BBC Natural History Unit
- Saul Nassé (born 1965), producer for the BBC (Tomorrow's World)
- Russell Barnes (born 1968), television producer (The Enemies of Reason, The Genius of Charles Darwin)
- David Jubb (born 1970), theatre director and chief executive of the Battersea Arts Centre
- Jim Threapleton (born 1973), painter and film director
- Russell Howard (born 1980), comedian and presenter (Russell Howard's Good News)
- Leon Parris (born 1981), writer, composer, musician and actor (Wolfboy)
- Jeremy Irvine (born 1990), UK and Hollywood actor (War Horse, Now Is Good, Great Expectations, The Railway Man)
- Sope Dirisu (born 1991), stage, television and film actor
- Suhani Gandhi (born 1994), model and actress

== Adventurers, aviators, exiles and prisoners of war ==
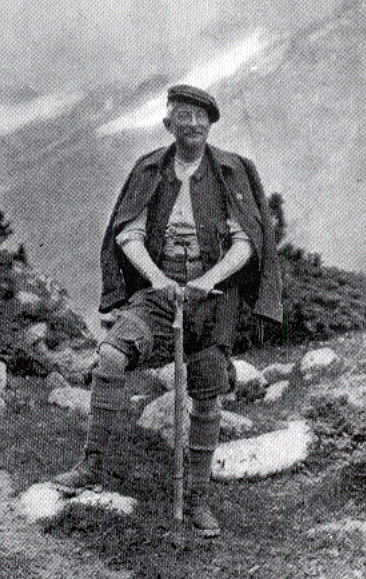
Captain Percy Farrar

- John Percy Farrar(1857–1929), mountaineer, President of the Alpine Club, Member of the Mount Everest Committee
- Sir Reginald Wolseley, 10th Baronet (1872–1933), dubbed the elevator baronet
- Captain and Bimbashi Henry Haymes (1872–1904), surgeon, an original explorer of the Bahr-el-Ghazal
- George E.M. Kelly (1878–1911), early aviator in the Aeronautical Division, US Signal Corps
- Captain Aeneas Lionel Acton Mackintosh (1879–1916), Antarctic explorer, commander of the Ross Sea party expedition
- W.A.B. Goodall (1880–1941), castaway, described as 'the ruler of the world's tiniest kingdom': Pulau Sarimbun, Straits of Johore
- Duncan Mackintosh, 31st Chattan (1884–1966), 31st Chief of Clan Chattan (1942–66)
- Wilfrid Thomas Reid (1887–1968), aircraft designer and pioneer of the Canadian aircraft industry
- P.C.B. Newington (1888–1964), author of a cookbook celebrating Malaysian food, conceived while starving as a prisoner of war
- Frederick Williamson (1891–1935), explorer, founder member of the Himalayan Club
- Captain Richard 'Dick' Howe (1916–1981), Escape Officer at Colditz Castle during World War II (1942–1945)
- Desmond 'Dizzy' de Villiers (1922–1976), chief test pilot at de Havilland and English Electric

== Architecture, art and design ==
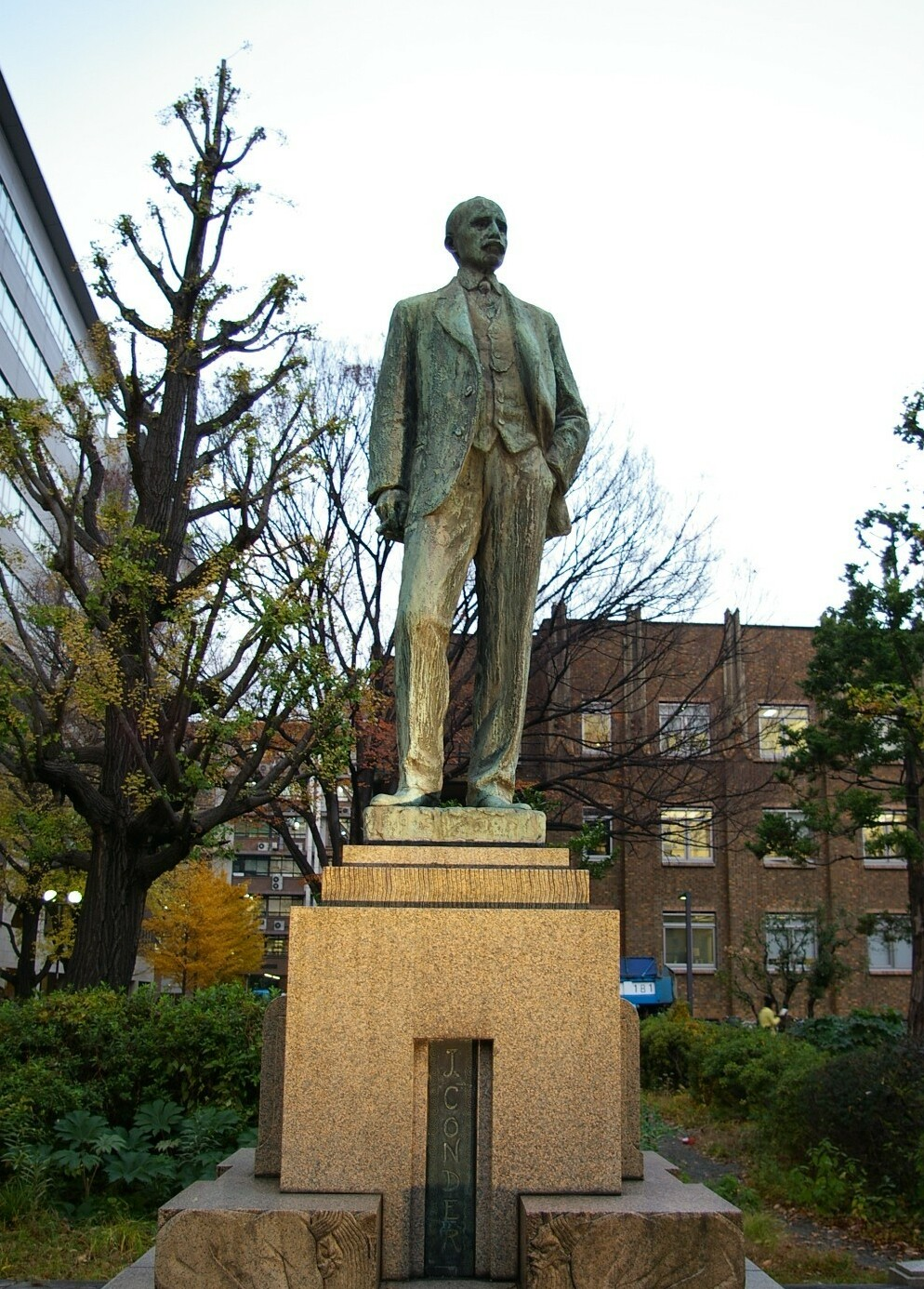
Josiah Conder, statue at the University of Tokyo

- Josiah Conder (1852–1920), architect who designed the Rokumeikan and other public buildings in Tokyo
- Henry John Sylvester Stannard (1870–1951), watercolour artist
- Sydney Morgan Eveleigh (1870-1947), architect in Vancouver
- Major Hugh Patrick Guarin Maule (1873–1940), architect (Royal Veterinary College in London)
- George Loraine Stampa (1875–1951), artist, contributor to Punch and other illustrated papers and magazines
- Walter Stonebridge (1879–1962), Diocesan Architect for Ely, St Albans and Bedford
- Algernon Winter Rose (1885–1918), architect
- Kenneth Alexander (1887–1975), photographer for United Artists, Samuel Goldwyn Productions and 20th Century Studios
- Robert Tor Russell (1888–1972), Chief Architect to the Government of India
- Thomas Francis Ford (1891–1971), Diocesan Architect for Southwark and a translator of the New Testament
- Alexander Girard (1907–1993), textile designer and interior architect
- Victor Farrar (1930–2007), architect
- Dennis Sharp (1933–2010), architect, professor, curator, historian, author and editor
- Peter Forster (1935–2021), wood engraver
- Steve Gibbons (born 1956), graphic designer
- Alex Chinneck (born 1984), installation artist

== Armed forces ==
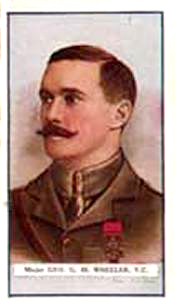
Major George Wheeler

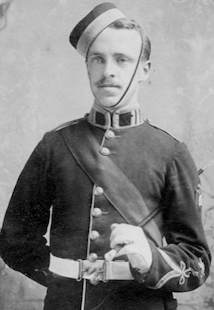
Lieutenant Charles Carroll Wood

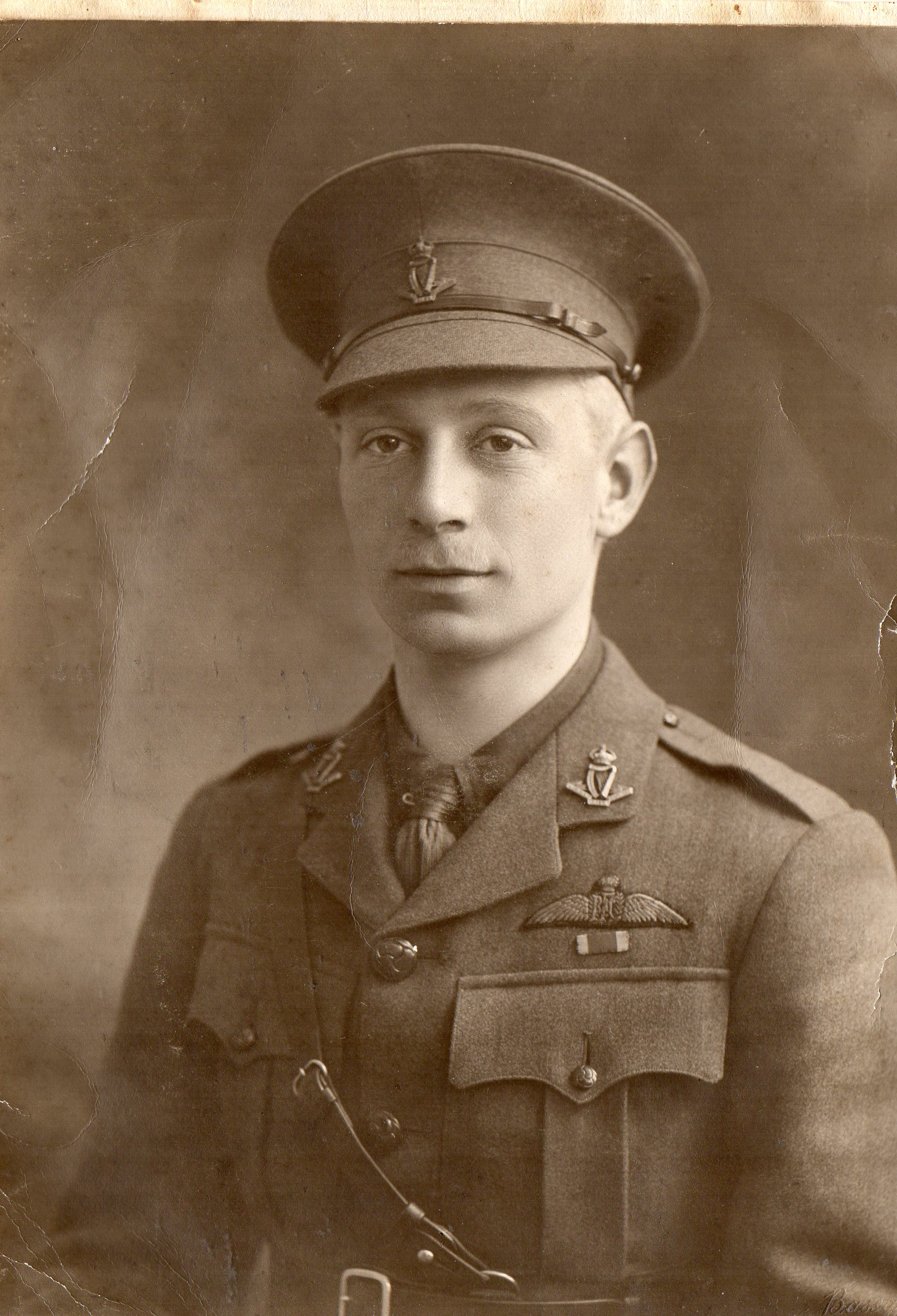
H.D. Harvey-Kelly

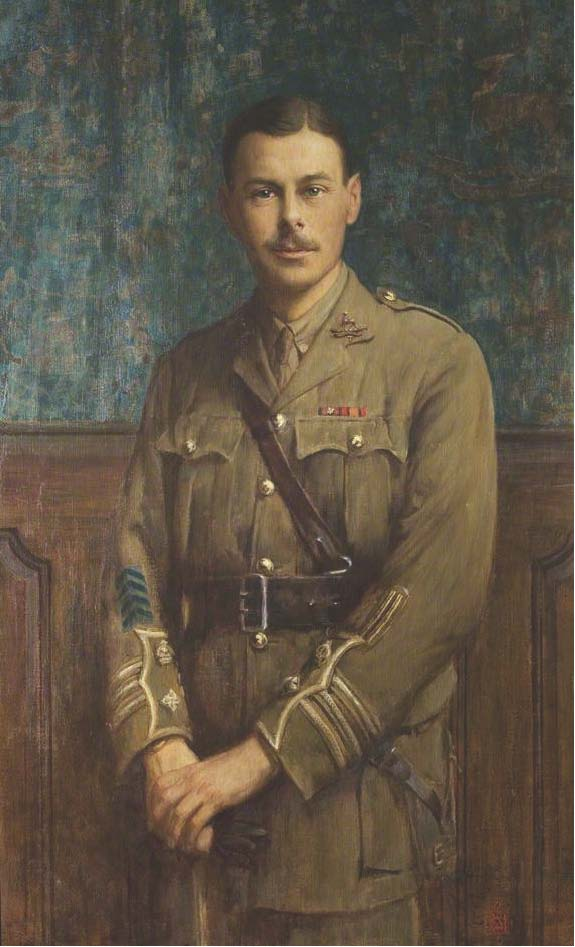
Lt-Col. James Knox

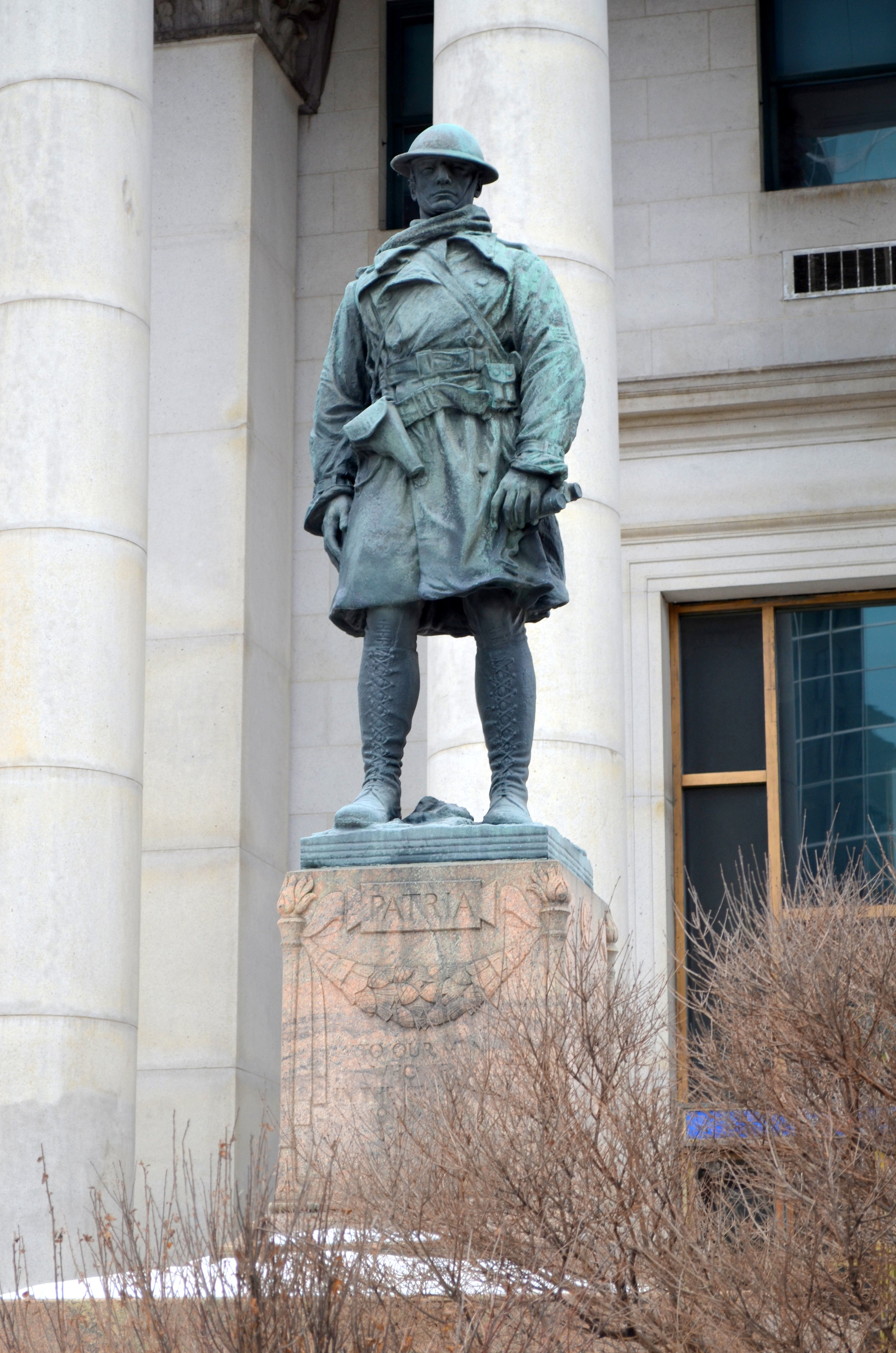
Capt. Wynn Bagnall , statue at Winnipeg, Canada

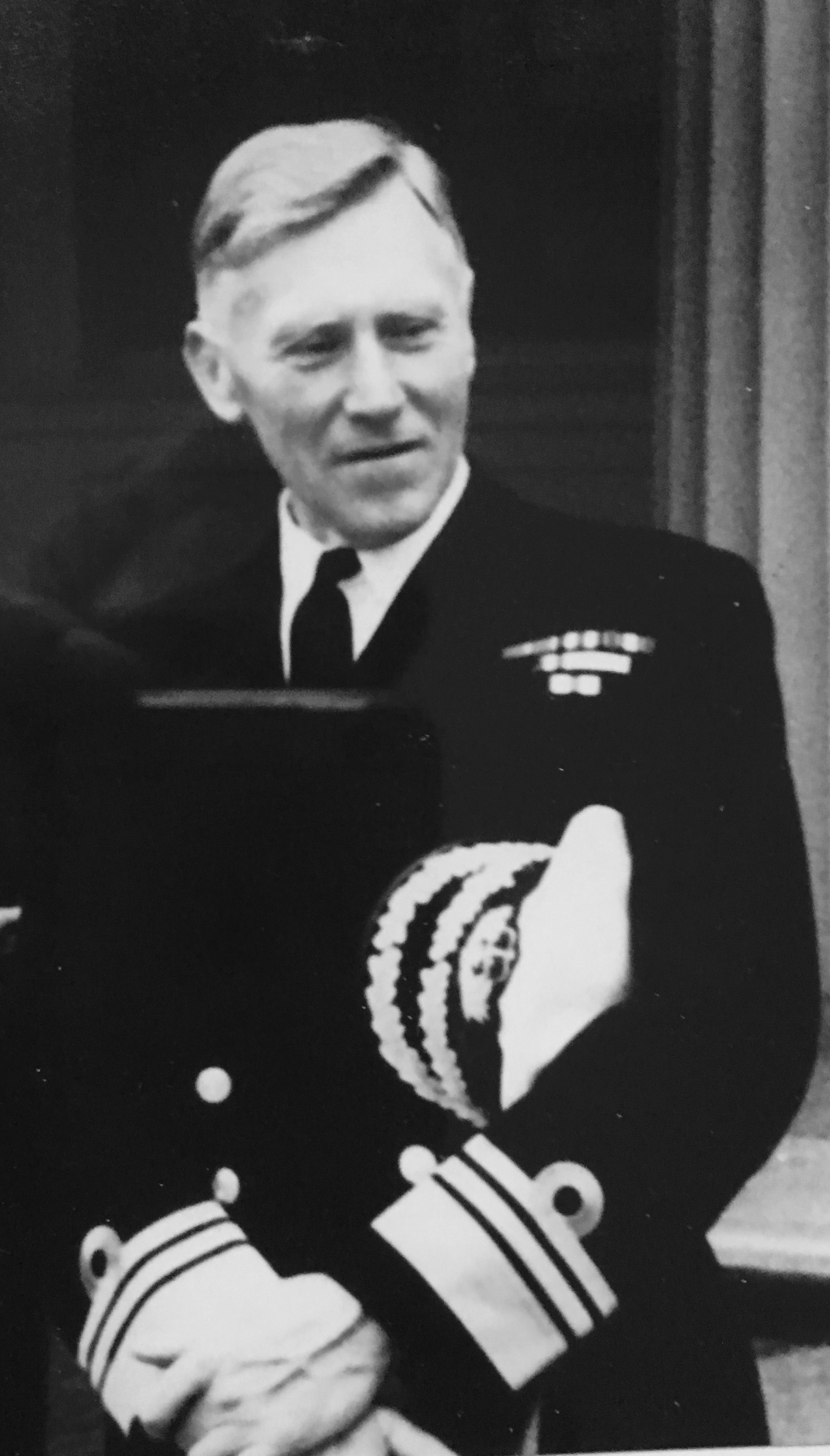
Sir Edwin Horlick

=== Air Force ===
- Wing Commander George Marshall Griffith (1877–1946), Commandant of the Royal Flying Corps in India
- Brigadier-General Percy Robert Clifford Groves (1878–1959), Air Strategist
- Air Vice-Marshal Robert Dickinson Oxland (1889–1959), Group Commander in Bomber Command (1943–44)
- Air Commodore Edye Rolleston Manning (1889–1957), senior officer in the Royal Air Force
- Air Commodore Charles Henry Elliott-Smith (1889–1994), senior officer in the Royal Air Force
- Major H. D. Harvey-Kelly (1891–1917), Squadron Commander, Royal Flying Corps
- Captain John E. L. Hunter (1897–1971), World War I flying ace
- Group Captain Robert Cecil Dawkins (1903–1985), Station Commander at RAF Tengah and RAF Hendon
- Air Commodore I. J. Fitch (1903–1944), deputy director of Intelligence at the Air Ministry
- Wing Commander Ernest Leslie 'Johnny' Hyde (1914–1942), senior officer in the Royal Air Force
- Squadron Leader Roland Anthony 'Tony' Lee Knight (1917–1941), World War II flying ace

=== Army ===
- Major-General Francis John Fowler (1864–1939) Commander of the Derajat Brigade (1914–16)
- Major-General Charles Astley Fowler (1865–1940), Brigade Commander at the Battle of Loos, 1915
- Brigadier-General Sir Arthur Long (1866–1941), Director of Transport and Supplies, Macedonia and The Black Sea
- Colonel Reginald Ruston (1867–1963), commander of the Mounted infantry of the Devon Regiment (1891–1903)
- Major Major R.T. Anwyl-Passingham (1867–1926), Commander of the 72nd Punjabis, High Sheriff of Merionethshire
- Lieutenant-General Gerald Robert Poole (1868–1937), Commandant of the Royal Marine Artillery
- Lt.-Col. Charles Forbes Buchan (1869–1954), Deputy Assistant Director at the War Office during WW1
- Colonel Ernest Clive Atkins (1870–1953), Commander of the 2/5th Leicestershire Regiment, High Sheriff of Leicestershire
- Lt-Col. Robert Leycester Haymes (1870–1942), first to establish an OP at the Battle of Neuve Chapelle
- Lt.-Col. C. A. Keatinge Johnson (1870–1937), senior officer in the First Australian Imperial Force
- Major-General Herbert William Jackson (1872–1940), Officer of the British Indian Army
- Major George Godfrey Massy Wheeler (1873–1915), was a recipient of the Victoria Cross
- Lt.-Col. Arthur Charles Rothery Nutt (1873–1946), inventor of the artillery miniature range
- Lt.-Col. R. E. Power (1874–1956), Commander of the 1st and 2nd Battalion of the Buffs
- Major-General Charles Howard Foulkes (1875–1969), Britain's chief adviser on gas warfare
- Brigadier-General Herbert Cecil Potter (1875–1964)
- Lieutenant Charles Carroll Wood (1876–1899), first Canadian born Officer to die in the Second Boer War
- Colonel Charles Temple Morris (1876–1956), Commander of the 5th Battalion of the 1st Punjab Regiment between 1921 and 1926
- Lt.-Col. James Meldrum Knox (1878–1918), Battalion Commander, Royal Warwickshire Regiment, 1915–18
- Brigadier-General Herbert Dobbin (1878–1946), Colonel-Commandant, Iraq Levies, the Duke of Cornwall's Light Infantry
- Brigadier-General Arthur Turner (1878–1952), Cricketer, rugby union player and soldier
- Colonel Wilfrid Stanley Richmond (1881–1962), deputy director of Roads in the BEF during World War I
- Lt.-Col. Henry Cecil Prescott (1882–1960), Inspector of Police in Iraq
- Colonel Guy Sutton Bocquet (1882–1961), ADC to the Viceroy of India
- Lt.-Col. Archibald Alderman Chase (1884–1917), Commander of the 8th Battalion of the Royal Sussex Regiment
- Brigadier Harold Evelyn William Bell Kingsley (1885–1970), Aide-de-Camp to King George VI
- Lt.-Col. Charles Harvey-Kelly (1885–1982), Military Attache in Kabul (1924-6)
- Lieutenant-General Reginald Dawson Hopcraft Lough (1886–1958), Aide-de-camp to King George VI
- Lt.-Col. Arthur Edward Flynn Fawcus (1886–1936), Commander, 1/5th North Staffordshire Regiment, 1/5th Sherwood Foresters
- Lt.-Col. William Francis Jackson (1886–1964), Signals Liaison Officer to the US Army HQ in the UK during World War II
- Major George Croxton Walker (1888–1936)
- Major Edward Crozier Creasy (1888–1936), senior liaison Officer during the Upper Silesia Plebiscite (1920–21)
- Captain Wynn Bagnall (1890–1931), Canadian Field Artillery, model for a statue by James Fraser in Winnipeg, Manitoba
- Lt.-Col. Melville Rysdale Ten Broeke (1891–1963), commander of Princess Patricia's Canadian Light Infantry Regiment
- Major General Leonard Arthur Hawes (1892–1986), Commanded the transport to France of the BEF during World War I
- Brigadier W.C.V. Galwey (1897–1977), Senior Officer who served in World War I and World War II
- Colonel Frederick Herbert Willasey Wilsey (1898–1971), Senior Liaison Officer to the Afghan delegation during the coronation of Queen Elizabeth II
- Brigadier Ernest Dynes (1903–1968), Aide-de-camp to HM Queen Elizabeth II (1955–57)
- Brigadier Thomas Henry Scott Galletly (1905–1972), Commander of the 1st Brigade, Arab League
- Major Colin Leo Bliss (1907–1944), pioneer of operational parachuting
- Major-General Reginald Booth Stockdale (1908–1979) Colonel Commandant, REME
- Lt.-Col. Peter Boughey (1911–1986), Special Operations Executive
- Major-General Keith Burch (1931–2013)

=== Navy ===
- Commander Willoughby Huddleston (1866–1953), ADC to Lord Pentland, Governor of Madras (1912–1919)
- Captain Thomas Oloff de Wet (1869–1940), Principal Naval Transport Officer during the evacuation of Constantinople in 1923
- Rear Admiral Alfred Ransom (1871–1953), senior officer in the Royal Navy
- Sir Ernest Huddleston (1874–1959), Aide-de-camp to the Viceroy of India
- Captain Francis Walter Despard Twigg (1883–1951), senior officer in the Royal Navy
- Commander Herbert Newton (1900–1973), Royal Navy Commander and Deputy Lieutenant of Bedfordshire
- Rear-Admiral Jack Highton (1904–1988), Aide-de-camp to Queen Elizabeth II
- Captain Fred Stovin-Bradford (1919–1974), Royal Navy Commander (Fleet Air Arm)
- Vice-Admiral Sir Ted Horlick (1925–2021), Director General of British Ships (1979–1983), Chief Naval Engineer Officer (1981–1983)

== Industry and commerce ==
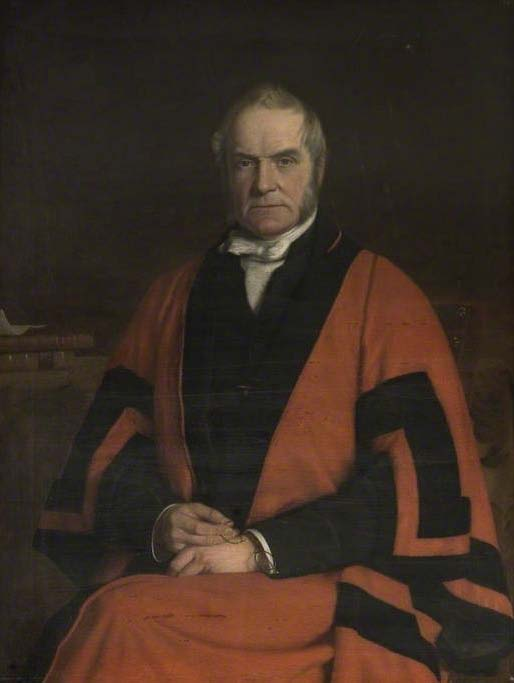
John Howard

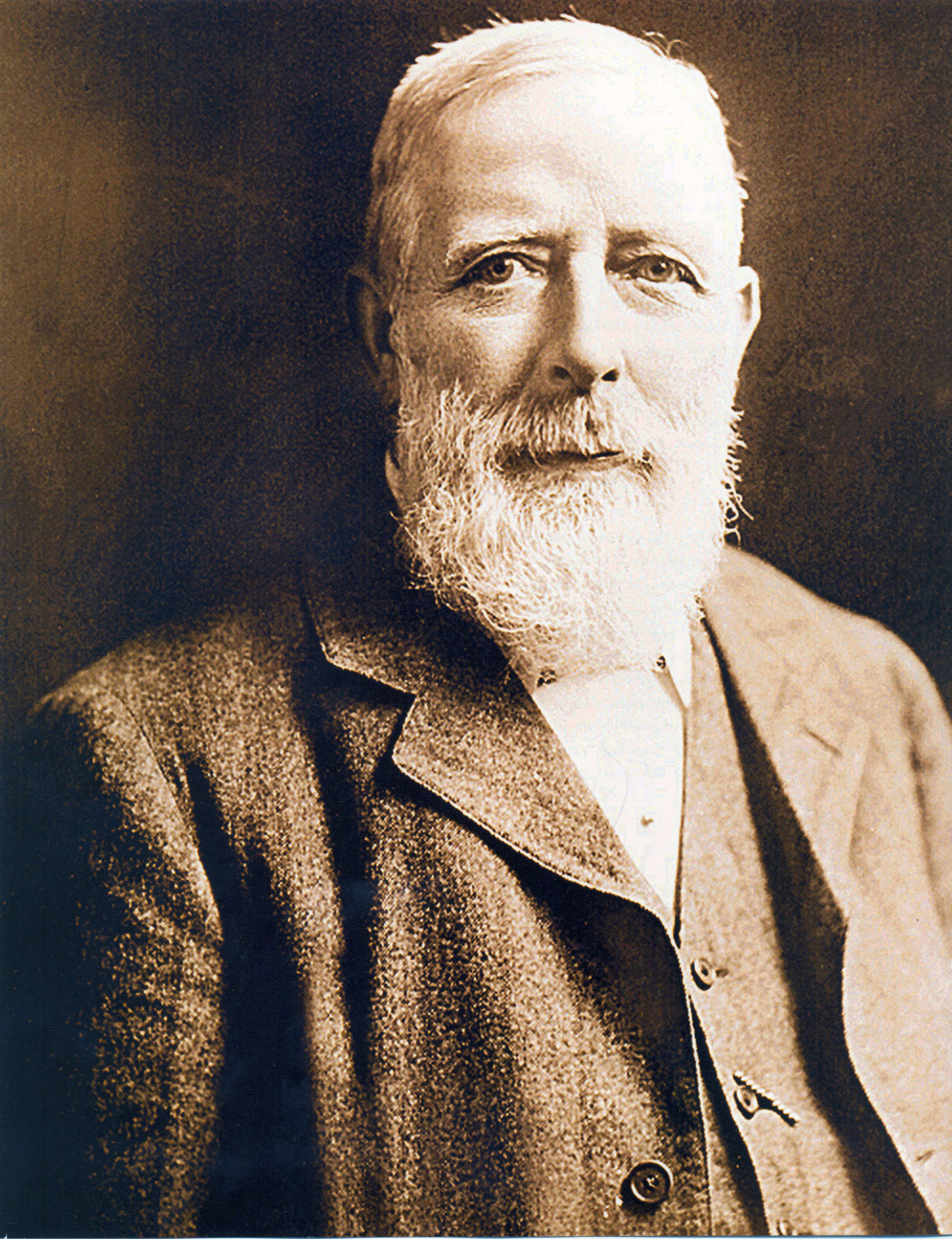
Charles Wells

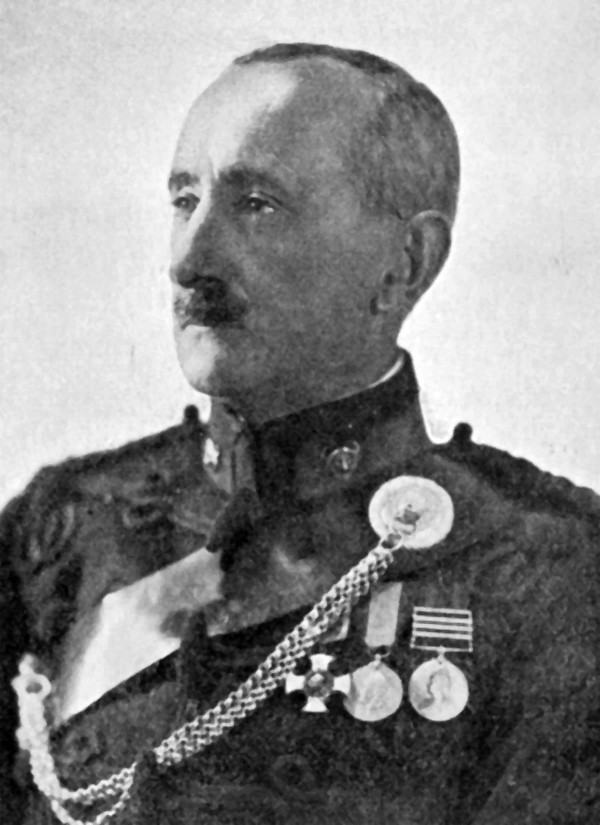
Sir George Farrar

- John Howard (1791–1878), industrialist, inventor of agricultural equipment and four times Mayor of Bedford
- James Howard (1821–1889), industrialist and inventor of agricultural equipment. MP for Bedford
- Sir Frederick Howard (1828–1915), industrialist
- Captain Charles Wells (1842–1914), founder of Charles Wells Ltd, progenitor of the Wells baronets of Felmersham
- Sir George Farrar, 1st Baronet (1859–1915), mining magnate, politician and soldier
- Lt. Col. Henry Batten Huddleston (1864–1944), Chief Agent and later a Director of the Burma Railways
- Walter Nutt (1874–1940), managing director of The Straits Trading Company (1918–21)
- Sir Noel Mobbs (1878–1959), founder of Slough Estates and High sheriff of Buckinghamshire
- E. E. Blake (1879–1961), Chairman of Kodak UK
- E. E. Cammack (1881–1958), prominent actuary in the USA
- William Pickwoad (1886–1975), prominent in South America's railway industry. Founding director of the Central Bank of Bolivia
- W. T. Godber (1904–1981), authority on agriculture and agricultural engineering
- Sir Henry Cecil Johnson (1906–1988), chairman of the British Railways Board (1968–71)
- Alastair George MacKenzie (1915–1989), prominent figure in South East Asian insurance during the 1960s and 1970s
- Francis Coulson (1919–1998), chef and hotelier
- Edward Roy Kent (1920–2009), estate owner and agriculturalist in the Caribbean
- Lt.-Col. Ray Daniels (1923–2003), Chief Executive of the William Press Group
- Max Wideman (1927–2026), expert in project management
- Sir Anthony Hartwell, 6th Baronet (1940–2023), Master mariner and Marine surveyor
- John Quenby (1941–2023), Chief Executive of the RAC Motor Sports Association (1990–2001)
- Andrew Stuart Winckler (1949–2007), Chief Executive of the Financial Services Authority (1996–98)
- Adrian Penfold (born 1952), Head of Planning at British Land, adviser to the UK Government
- Graham Clive Watts (born 1956), Chief Executive of the Construction Industry Council
- Richard Bradbury (born 1956), Chief Executive of River Island (2008–11), director of Boden (2012–)
- Angus Knowles-Cutler (born 1962), senior partner at Deloitte
- Steve Melton (born 1962), Chief Executive of Exemplar Health Care
- Nick Blofeld (born 1964), managing director of Epsom Downs Racecourse (2007–09), Chief Executive of Bath Rugby (2009–14)
- Marcus Weldon (born 1968), 13th President of Bell Labs

== Journalism ==
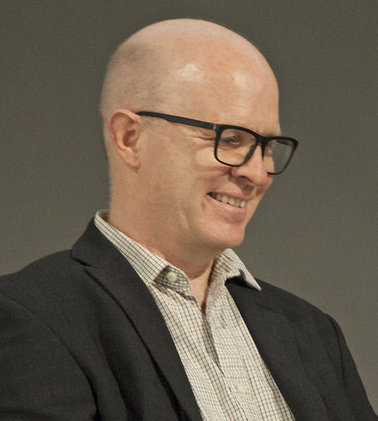
Nicholas Shaxson

- William Fairbridge (1863–1943), founder of the Rhodesia Herald and the Bulawayo Chronicle, first mayor of Salisbury
- Leonard Dudeney (1875–1956), newspaper editor (North China Daily News) and parliamentary correspondent (Daily Express and Daily Sketch)
- Albert Powtrill Ager (1876–1956), editor, manager and publisher of The Straits Times
- Gaston Hanet Archambault (1877–1951), correspondent at The New York Times
- Lindsay Bashford (1881–1921), Literary Editor of the Daily Mail
- Richard Capell (1885–1954), music critic for the Daily Mail (1911–33) and the Daily Telegraph (1933–54)
- George Matthews (1917–2005), leading communist and editor of the Daily Worker/Morning Star from 1959 to 1974
- Eric Litchfield (1920–1982), sports editor of The Rand Daily Mail (1956–1970), the Cape Times (1970–82) and author
- Jon Akass (1933–1990), Fleet Street columnist
- Sir Nicholas Lloyd (born 1942), newspaper editor, News of the World (1984) and the Daily Express (1986–95)
- Michael Toner (1944–2025), leader writer at the Sunday Express and Daily Mail. Author and novelist
- Christopher Wilson (born 1947), journalist and Royal biographer
- Nicholas Shaxson (born 1966), author, journalist and associate fellow of Chatham House (Treasure Islands)
- Ben Anderson (born 1975), television reporter, journalist and writer (Holidays in the Axis of Evil)

== Law ==
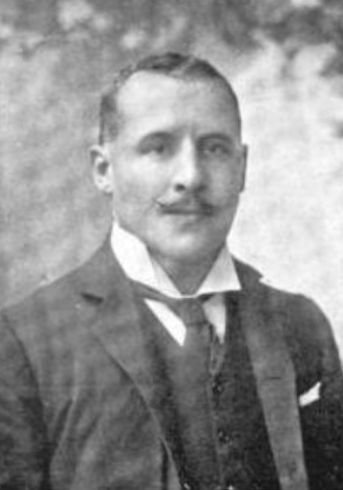
Sir William Tudball

- Alfred Clare (1851–1912), District Registrar of the High Court of Justice
- William Robert Bousfield (1854–1943), expert on patent law
- Sir William Tudball (1866–1943). Puisne judge of the High Court of Allahabad (1909–1922)
- Sir Sidney Abrahams (1885–1957), Chief Justice of Tanganyika and Ceylon
- Sir Clement Thornton Hallam (1891–1965), Solicitor to the General Post Office
- James Mould (1893–1958), Queen's Counsel, Bencher of Gray's Inn and a Fellow of University College London
- Rowland Thomas Lovell Lee (1920–2005), Recorder of the Crown Court (1979–92)
- Stephen John Wooler (born 1948), HM Chief Inspector to the Crown Prosecution Service (1999–2010)
- Nicholas Stewart (born 1947), King's Counsel, Bencher of the Inner Temple and Deputy High Court Judge
- Tim Lord (born 1966), King's Counsel and Bencher of the Inner Temple

== Literature ==
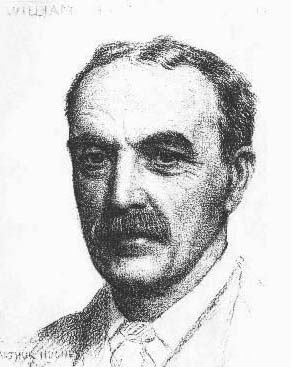
William Hale White

- William Hale White (1831–1913), author known by his pseudonym Mark Rutherford
- Neil Wynn Williams (1864–1940), novelist, writer and contributor of short stories and articles to periodicals and journals
- George Moreby Acklom (1870–1959), writer, literary editor of E.P. Dutton, father of the Hollywood actor David Manners
- Sir Henry Howarth Bashford (1880–1961), author of Augustus Carp, Esq. and several other satirical novels
- Eric Temple Bell, (1883–1960), science fiction author (as John Taine)
- David Scott Daniell (1906–1965), author, playwright and regimental historian
- Christopher Fry (1907–2005), poet and playwright. Awarded the Queen's Gold Medal for Poetry in 1962
- Gordon Thomas (1933–2017), investigative journalist and author (Gideon's Spies, The Pope's Jews)
- John Andrews (born 1936), author and antiques writer
- David Morse (born 1938), author on Motown, Romanticism and the Victorian era
- Russell Ash (1946–2010), author (The Top 10 of Everything)
- S.I. Martin (born 1961), author, historian and journalist specialising in Black British history and literature
- Stephen May (born 1964), novelist, playwright and TV writer
- Toby Litt (born 1968), author (Beatniks, Corpsing, Finding Myself, Journey into Space)

== Medicine ==
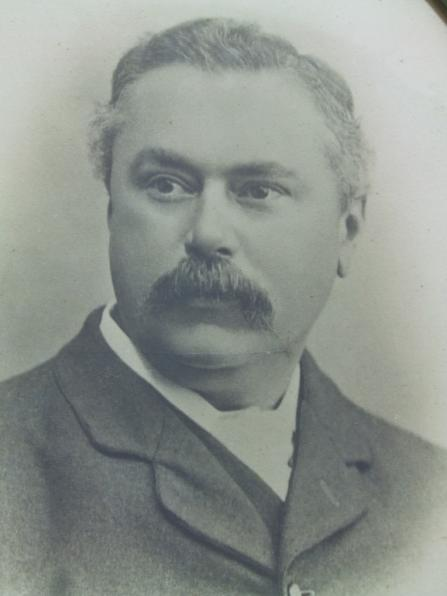
George Cleghorn

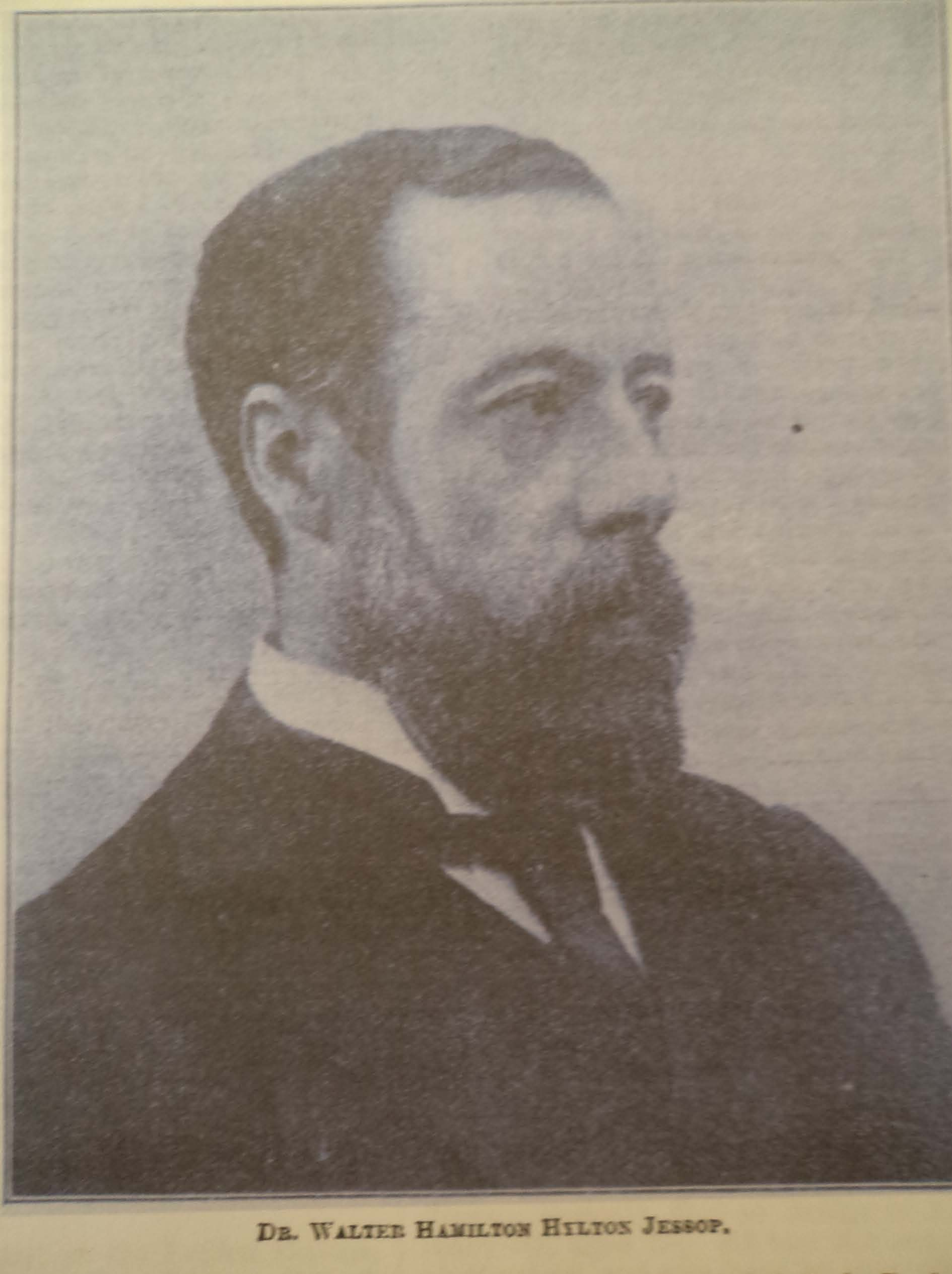
Walter Jessop FRCS

- Samuel Hoppus Adams (1835–1895), surgeon and physician
- George Cleghorn (1850–1902), President of the New Zealand Medical Association
- Walter Jessop (1852–1917), Ophthalmic Surgeon at St Bartholomew's, President of the UK Ophthalmological Society
- Major-General Harold Percy Waller Barrow (1856–1957), Honorary Surgeon to King George V
- Major-General George Francis Angelo Harris (1856–1931), Honorary Surgeon to King George V and the Viceroy of India
- Rickard William Lloyd (1859–1933), Consulting Anaesthetist and author
- Charles Hubert Roberts (1865–1929), Obstetrician and Gynaecologist
- Claud Alley Worth (1869–1936), ophthalmologist, inventor of the Worth 4 dot test and Worth's Ambyloscope, world authority on squint
- Frank Atcherley Rose (1873–1935), surgeon at St Bartholomew's Hospital (1928–31)
- Thomas Shepherd Novis (1874–1962), Professor of Surgery at Grant Medical College, Bombay
- Major-General Harold Rothery Nutt (1876–1953), Honorary Surgeon to King George V and the Viceroy of India
- Cyril Arthur Bennett Horsford (1876–1953), Laryngologist to the Royal College of Music
- John Wycliffe Linnell (1878–1967), Consulting Physician
- Sir Henry Howarth Bashford (1880–1961), Honorary Physician to King George VI
- Sir Adolphe Abrahams (1883–1967), Olympic Medical Officer from 1912
- H. L. D. Kirkham (1887–1949), first Professor of Plastic Surgery at Baylor University, Texas, recipient of the US Legion of Merit
- Frank Cook (1888–1972), Beit Fellow, obstetric and gynaecological surgeon
- Basil Laver (1894–1934), surgeon
- Arkyl Staveley Gough (1900–1990), surgeon
- Anthony Andreasen (1906–1986), surgeon to the Viceroy of India
- Sir George Godber (1908–2009), Chief Medical Officer for HM Government in England (1960–73)
- William Edward Lancaster (1909–2003), Chief Executive of the Royal Zoological Society of South Australia
- Joseph Graeme Humble (1913–1980), Professor of Haematology at Westminster Hospital
- Ernest Cotchin (1917–1988), Professor of Veterinary Pathology at the Royal Veterinary College (1963-1982)
- Dr Richard Norman Smith (1926–1988), President of the British Veterinary Association between 1975 and 1976.
- Michael Tynan (born 1934), Professor of Paediatric Cardiology at Guy's Hospital (1982–99)
- Dr Vaughan Southgate (born 1944), parasitologist
- John Clibbens (born 1953), Professor of Developmental Psychology at Birmingham City University
- Dr Henry Otto Brünjes (born 1954), Chairman of Premier Medical Group
- Mark Woodhead (born 1954), world authority on lung infection and pneumonia
- Dr Ian Martin Wylie (born 1955), Chief Executive of the Royal College of Obstetricians and Gynaecologists
- Michael Trudgill (born 1966), Chief Medical Officer at the UK Civil Aviation Authority
- Raghib Ali (born 1975), epidemiologist

== Music ==
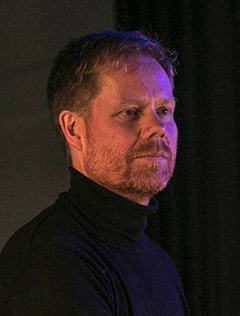
Max Richter

- Roland Bocquet (1878–1956), composer, Professor of Music Theory at Dresden Conservatory
- Cyril Gell (1909–1994), musician, conductor of the BBC Singers and former professor at the Guildhall School of Music
- Derek Scott (1921–2006), composer and music director for film and television (The Muppet Show)
- Gordon Langford (1930–2017), brass band and orchestral music composer, arranger and performer (Return of the Jedi, Superman II)
- Paul Paviour (1931–2024), composer, organist and conductor based in Australia
- Tim Souster (1943–1994), composer
- Justin Lavender (born 1951), operatic tenor and professor of vocal studies at the Royal College of Music
- Paul Christison Edwards (born 1955), organist and composer of music for the Anglican Church
- Nicholas Carthy (born 1957), Conductor of the Orchestra della Svizzera Italiana (1993–96), Professor of Music at the University of Colorado
- Michael Hext (born 1961), inaugural winner of the BBC Young Musician of the Year Competition
- Max Richter (born 1966), composer
- Don Broco, band
- Segun Akinola (born 1993), composer and music director for film and television (Doctor Who)

== Public office ==
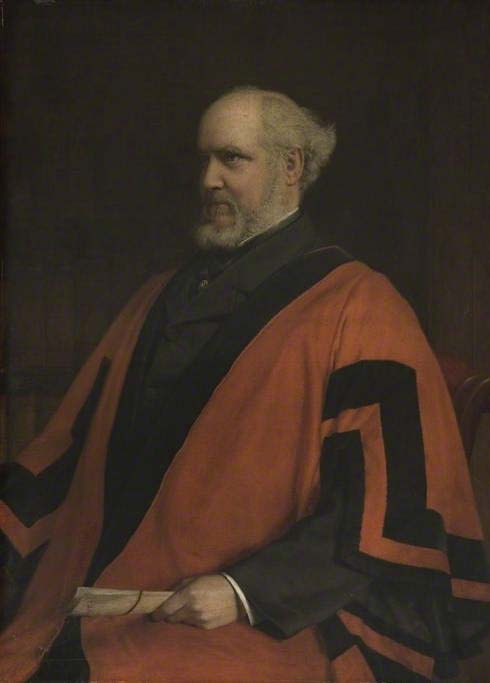
James Howard MP

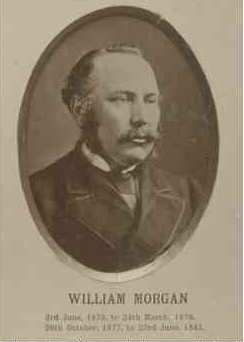
Sir William Morgan

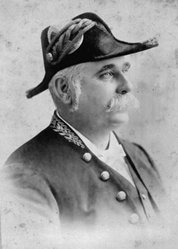
Arthur Carter

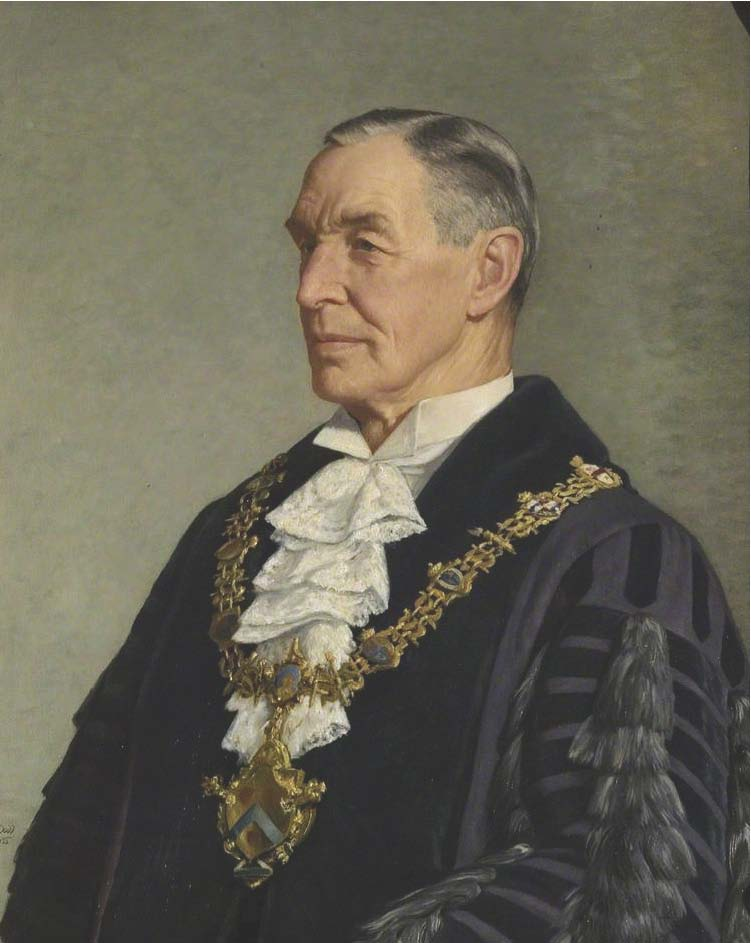
Sir Archibald Flower

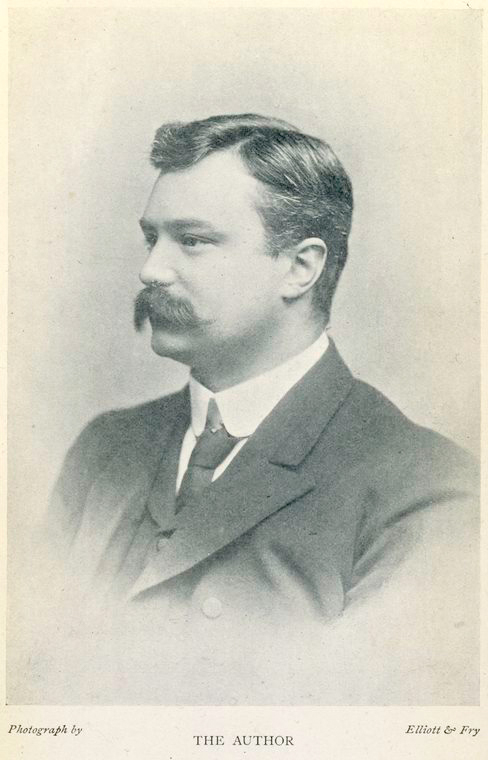
E.D. Morel MP

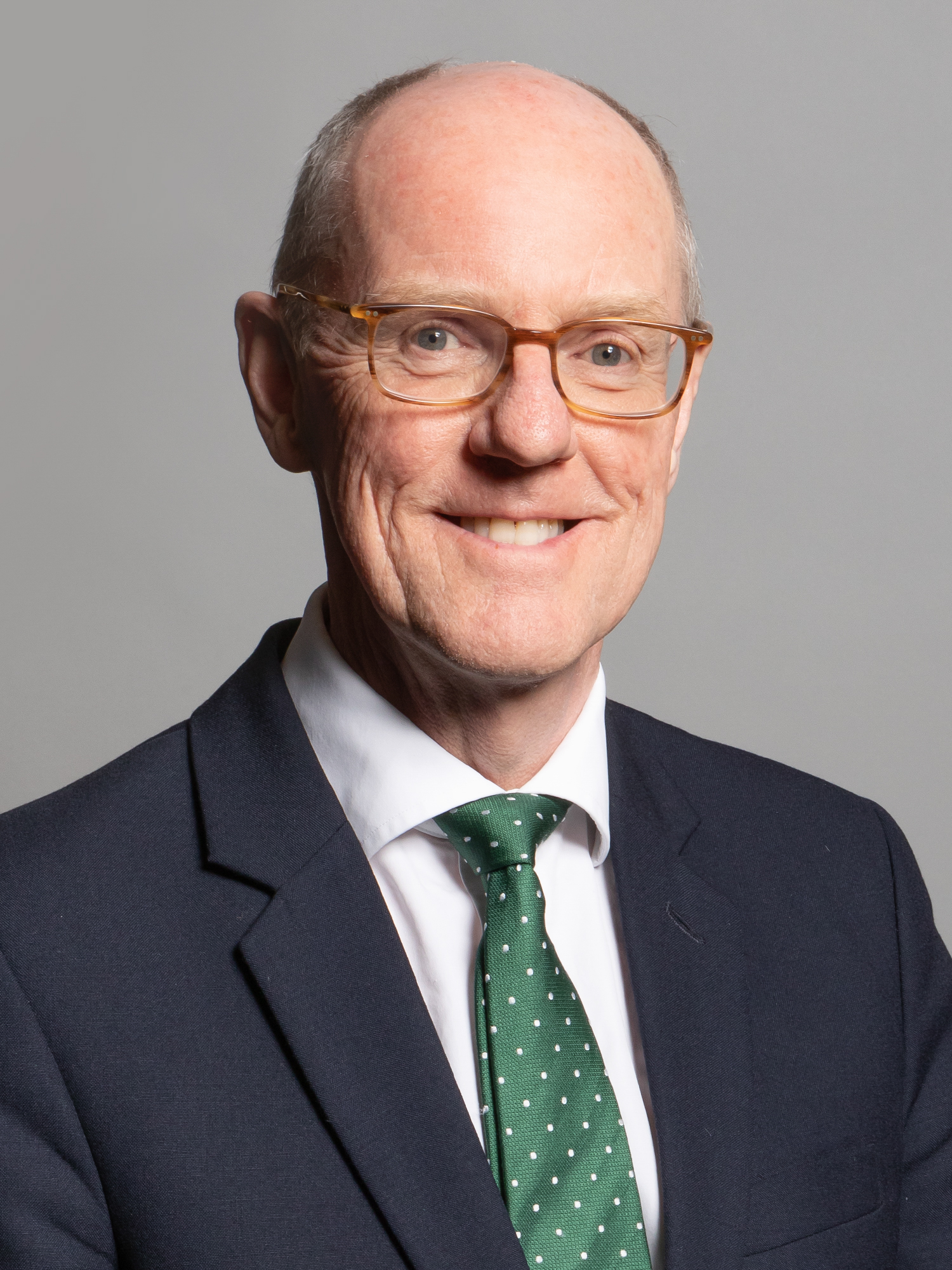
Sir Nick Gibb

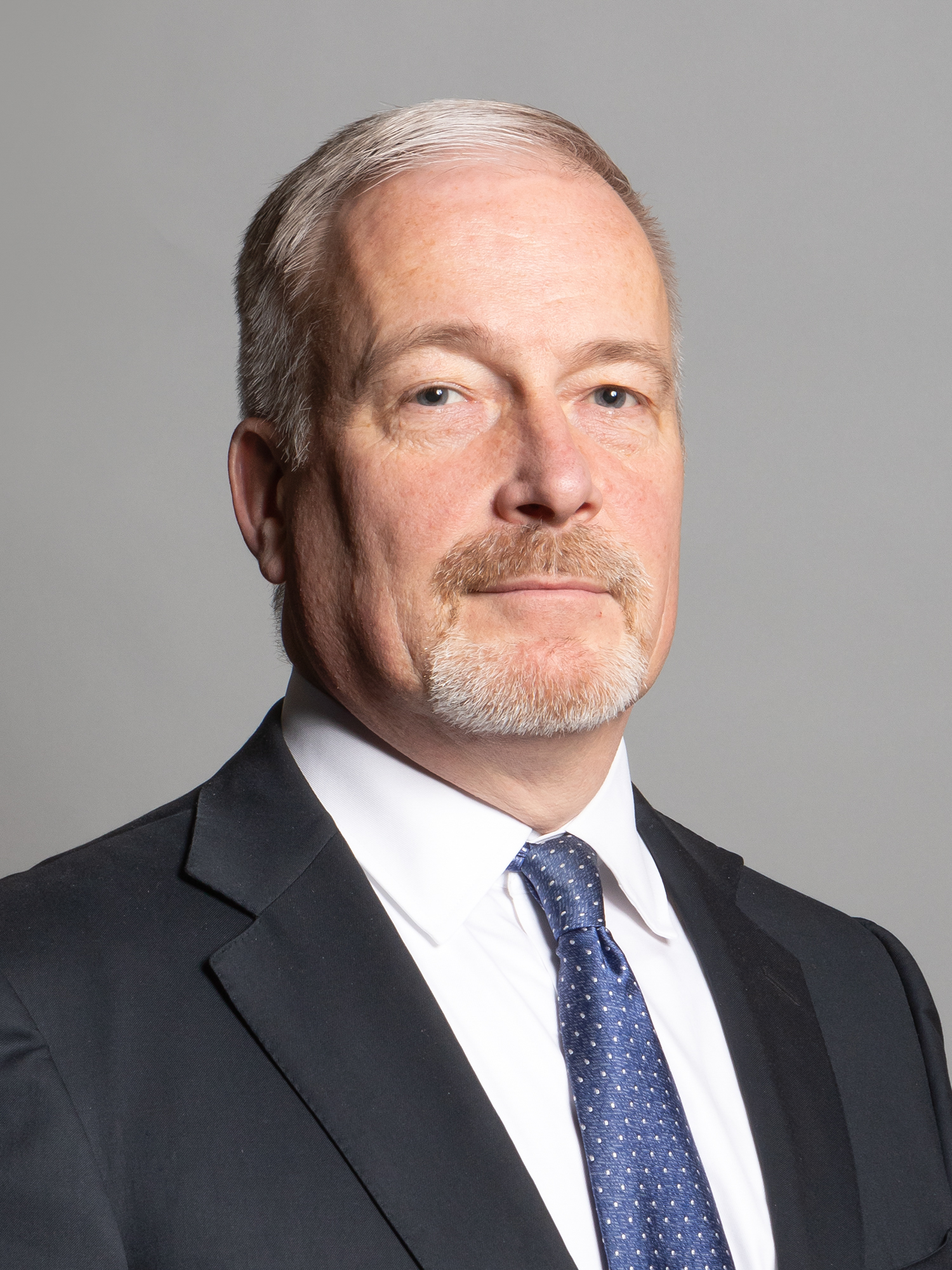
Richard Fuller

=== Home ===
- James Howard (1821–1889), Liberal MP
- William Robert Bousfield (1854–1943), Conservative MP
- Arthur Pedley (1859–1943), senior civil servant
- Arthur Sheppard (1862–1944), Private Secretary to the Archbishop of Canterbury (1902–1928)
- Sir Archibald Dennis Flower (1865–1950). Chairman of the Trustees and Guardians of Shakespeare's birthplace
- Colonel John Alfred Lawrence Billingham (1868–1955), Chief Inspector of Works, War Office (1928–33)
- Edmund Dene Morel (1873–1924), Labour MP
- Major Frederick Reginald Phipps (1875–1927), Senior Engineering Inspector at the Ministry of Transport, 1924 to 1927
- Sir Ralph Endersby Harwood (1883–1951). Financial Secretary to three Kings (1935–37)
- Davenport Fabian Cartwright Blunt (1888–1965), Under-Secretary at HM Treasury (1946–48)
- Reginald Berkeley (1890–1935), Liberal MP
- Sir Laurence George Gale (1905–1969). Controller, Royal Ordnance Factories
- Hugh Chaplin (1905–1996), Principal Keeper of Printed Books at the British Museum
- Jack Morton (1911–1985). Assistant Undersecretary of State at the Ministry of Defence (1968–71)
- Philip Lionel Burton (1914–1996), Head of the Civil Service Pay Research Unit between 1963 and 1971
- Arthur Jones (1915–1991), Conservative MP. Mayor of Bedford
- Edgar William Boyles (1921–2001), Under-Secretary at the Inland Revenue (1975–81)
- Tony Hart (1923–2009), leader of Kent C.C. during the development of the Channel Tunnel, Eurostar and the Dartford Bridge
- Colonel Brian Ernest Maitland Prophet (1928–2004), Deputy Lieutenant of Bedfordshire
- Sir Stanley John Odell (1929–2021), former Chairman of the National Union of Conservative Constituency Associations
- Sir Keith Speed (1934–2018), Conservative MP. Undersecretary of State for Defence (1979–81)
- Jeffery John Mumford Speed (born 1936) was Director of Fundraising at Conservative Central Office
- Rev. Jeffrey James West (1950–2022), Inspector of Historic Buildings, English Heritage (1983–86)
- Patrick Hall (born 1951), former Labour MP
- Nick Hawkins, (born 1957), former Conservative MP
- Andrew Charles Gilchrist (born 1960), former General Secretary of the Fire Brigades Union
- Sir Nick Gibb (born 1960), former Conservative MP
- Richard Fuller (born 1962), Conservative MP
- Matt Cavanagh (born 1971), special adviser to New Labour (2003–2010)

=== Overseas ===
- Sir William Morgan (1828–1883), Premier of South Australia (1878–81)
- Arthur Carter (1847–1917), businessman, Australian Consul to Norway, Member of the Queensland Legislative Council
- Leonard Isitt (1855–1937), M.P. for the New Zealand Liberal Party and member of the New Zealand Legislative Council
- Charles Frederick Gale (1860–1928), senior Australian civil servant, Chief Protector of Aborigines in Western Australia
- C. W. P. Douglas de Fenzi (1863–1927), Clerk to the Legislative Council of Natal
- Henry George Graves (1864–1929), Controller of Patents and Designs in India between 1904 and 1919
- Sir Ernest Wilton (1870–1952), President of the Commission for the Government of the Saar Basin
- Herbert George Billson (1871–1938), Chief Conservator of Indian Forests, 1922–26
- Sir William Pell Barton(1871–1956), Resident in Baroda (1919), Mysore (1920–25) and Hyderabad (1925–30)
- William McKinnell (1873–1939), politician who served in the Legislative Assembly of Manitoba, Canada (1920–36)
- Walter Nutt (1874–1940), a member of the Federal Malay States Legislative council
- John Richard Donovan Glascott (1877–1938), Chief Engineer of the Burma Railways, Member of the Legislative Council of Burma
- Sir Robert Daniel Richmond (1878–1948), Chief Conservator, Indian Woods and Forests
- Archie Rose (1879–1961), diplomat, explorer and businessman in China
- John Mervyn Dallas Wrench (1883–1961), Chief Engineer of the Great Indian Peninsular Railway
- Sir Francis Moncrieff Kerr-Jarrett (1885–1968), Custos Rotulorum of St James's, Jamaica
- Stanley Wyatt Smith (1887–1958), Consul-General of Manila (1938–42) and Honolulu (1943–44)
- Major-General Ronald Okeden Alexander (1888–1949), Inspector General, Central Canada (1942–46)
- Charles Hawes (1890–1963). Chief Engineer to the Government of Sind
- Frederick Williamson (1891–1935), Consul-General of Kashgar (1927–30)
- Reginald Philip Abigail (1892–1969), District Commissioner of Arakan during the fall of Burma in 1942
- Robert Skinner (1893–1969), Federal Treasurer of the Leeward Islands
- Bertram St. Leger Ten Broeke (1895–1962), Deputy Inspector-General of the Indian Police in Bihar
- W. D. Harverson (1903–92), Commissioner of Mines in Kenya (1949–58) and Tanganyika (1958–62)
- Walter Ian James Wallace (1905–1993), Assistant Undersecretary of State at the Colonial Office (1962–66)
- Sir Arthur Mooring (1908–1969), British Resident in Zanzibar (1959–1963)
- Cyril Herbert Williams (1908–1983), Provincial Commissioner of the Nyanza Province of Kenya (1951–56)
- Roger Tancred Robert Hawkins (1915–1980), Rhodesian politician and member of Ian Smith's cabinet after Rhodesia's UDI
- Victor Yarnell (1919–2005), American politician, Democratic Mayor of Reading, Pennsylvania (1968–1972)
- Colonel Ian Cook (1934–1994), Commander of the Vanuatu Mobile Police Force (1980–84)
- Malcolm Geoffrey Hilson (born 1942), High Commissioner of Vanuatu (1997–2000)
- Paul Reddicliffe (born 1945), British Ambassador to the Kingdom of Cambodia (1994–1997)
- Michael Crowther (born 1952), CEO of the Indianapolis Zoo, founder of the Indianapolis Prize
- Mohamed Farid Md Rafik (1976–2019), Malaysian politician

== Religion ==
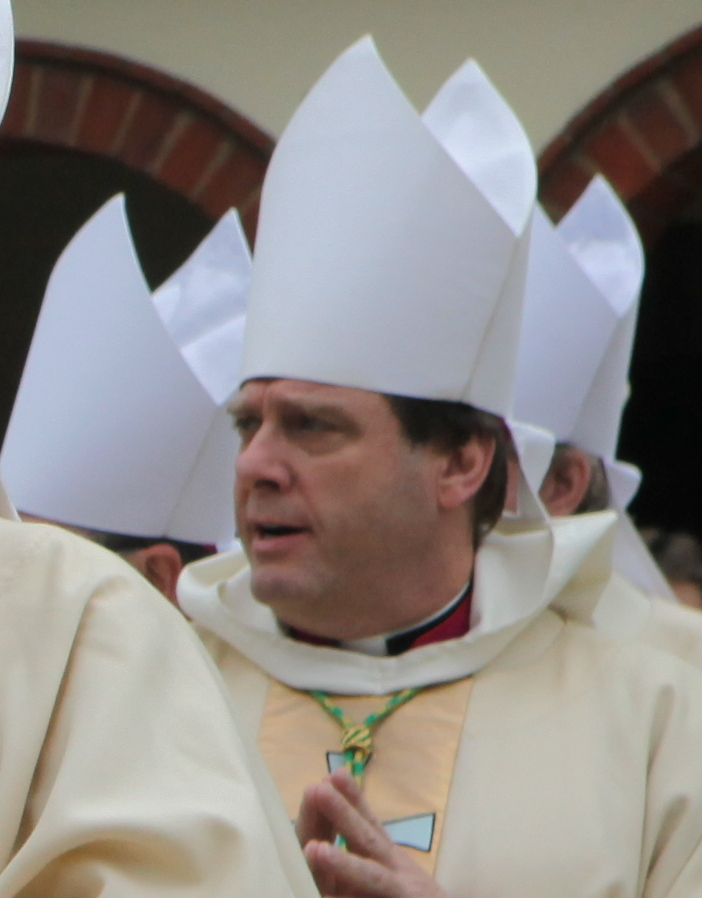
Tony Robinson

- Rev. William Toll (1843–1915), Suffragan bishop of the Episcopal Diocese of Chicago (1911–15)
- Canon Thomas Blyth (1844–1913), author and Commissary to the Archbishop of Ottawa and Bishops of Niagara
- Rev Henry Arthur Lester (1873–1922), theologian, director of the Bishop of London's Sunday School Council (1911–1922)
- Rev. Arthur Raley (1889–1964), Chaplain to Royal Air Force Command during World War II
- Thomas Dix (1908-1985), Archdeacon of Zanzibar
- Robert Brown (1914–2001), Archdeacon of Bedford (1974–79)
- Rev. Noel Stanton (1926–2009), founder of the Jesus Army
- Bryan W. Ball (1935–2025), theologian, former President of the Seventh-day Adventist Church in the South Pacific
- Dennis Frederick Orme (born 1938), former leader of Unification Churches in England, theologian and author
- Rev. Tony Robinson (born 1956), Bishop of Wakefield

== Sport ==
=== Art ===
- George Loraine Stampa (1875–1951), participant in the art competition at the 1928 Summer Olympics

=== Athletics ===
- Thomas Edgar Hammond (1878–1945), track and field athlete who competed in the 1908 Summer Olympics
- Sir Sidney Abrahams (1885–1957), competed in the Long jump at the 1912 Summer Olympics
- Dr H.W. Evans (1890–1927), athlete, rugby player and physician
- Ken Richardson (1918–1998), athlete, silver medallist in the 1938 British Empire Games
- Julie Rogers (born 1998), participant in the 2012 Summer Paralympics and the 2016 Summer Paralympics

=== Chess ===
- Charles Blake (1880–1961), U.S. Open Chess Champion in 1911
- Harold James Plaskett (born 1960), British Chess Champion in 1990

=== Cricket ===
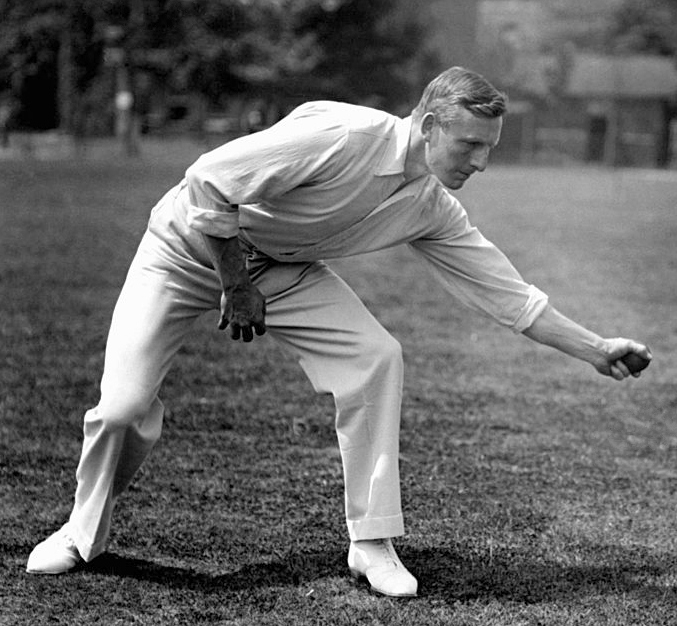
Arthur Jones

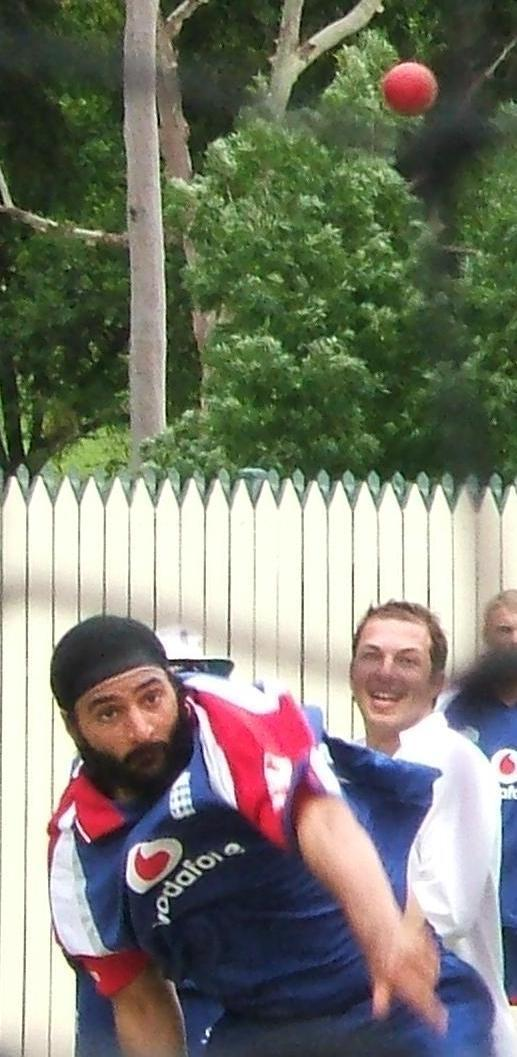
Monty Panesar

- Arthur Jones (1872–1914), Captained the England cricket team. Wisden Cricketer of the Year in 1900
- Lionel Brown (1872–1938), cricketer
- Arthur Jervois Turner (1878–1952), cricketer and rugby union player
- Sir Robert Daniel Richmond (1878–1948), played cricket for Jamaica
- Walter Martin Fitzherbert Turner (1881–1948), cricketer
- Arthur Cantrell (1883–1954), cricketer
- Norman Oliver (1886–1948), played cricket for Bedfordshire and Brazil
- Frederick Charles William Newman (1896–1966), cricketer
- Basil Rogers (1896–1975), cricketer
- Ernest Dynes (1903–1968), cricketer
- Maurice Pugh (1903–1986), cricketer
- Arthur Grenfell Coomb (1929–2022), cricketer
- Bob Gale (1933–2018), cricketer
- Geoff Millman (1934–2005), England cricketer
- Graham Jarrett (1937–2004), cricketer
- Peter David Watts (born 1938), cricketer
- Peter Kippax (1940–2017), cricketer
- Andrew Curtis (born 1943), cricketer
- Alan Fordham (born 1964), cricketer
- Neil Stanley (1968-2024), cricketer
- Andrew Trott (born 1968), cricketer
- Paul Owen (born 1969) played cricket for Canada
- Matthew White (born 1969), cricketer
- Kelvin Locke (born 1980), cricketer
- Oliver Clayson (born 1980), cricketer
- Jamie Wade (born 1981), cricketer
- Monty Panesar (born 1982), England cricketer. Wisden Cricketer of the Year in 2007
- Richard King (born 1984), cricketer
- Robin Kemp (born 1984), cricketer
- Matthew Taylor (born 1999), cricketer

=== Football ===
- James Oswald Anderson (1872–1932), footballer for Lomas Athletic Club and Argentina, cricketer for Hertfordshire
- Andrew Ralston (1880–1950), footballer (Spurs and Watford). FA administrator
- Eric Litchfield (1920–1982), footballer (Newcastle United F.C., Leeds United F.C.)
- Gordon Brice (1924–2003), cricketer and footballer (Luton Town, Wolverhampton Wanderers, Reading, Fulham)
- Pemi Aderoju (born 2005), footballer for Peterborough United F.C.

=== Hockey ===
- Charles Howard Foulkes (1875–1969), field hockey player who competed in the 1908 Summer Olympics

=== Rallying ===
- Ian Mantle (1920–2010), engineer and rally driver

=== Rowing ===
- Sir Archibald Dennis Flower (1865–1950), rowed for Cambridge in the 1886 Boat Race
- William Mansfield Poole (1871–1946), rowed for Oxford in the 1891 Boat Race
- Sir George Godber (1908–2009), rowed for Oxford in the 1928 and 1929 Boat Races
- Tony Leadley (born 1928), rowed for the United Kingdom and for Cambridge in the 1953 Boat Race
- Peter Knapp (born 1949), rower who competed in the 1968 Summer Olympics
- John Yallop (born 1949), rower who won a silver medal at the 1976 Summer Olympics in Montreal
- Neil Keron (born 1953), rower who competed in the 1976 Summer Olympics
- Tim Foster (born 1970), rower who won a Gold Medal at the 2000 Summer Olympics in Sydney
- David Gillard (born 1971), rowed for Great Britain and also for Cambridge in the 1991, 1992 and 1993 Boat Races
- Rod Chisholm (born 1974), rower who competed in the 2008 Summer Olympics and 2012 Summer Olympics

=== Rugby ===
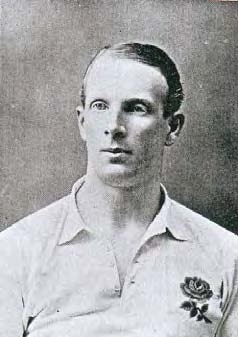
Lt.Col Edgar Mobbs DSO

- Horace William Finlinson (1871–1956), England Rugby International
- Wardlaw Brown Thomson (1871–1921), England Rugby International
- Lt.-Col. Edgar Mobbs (1882–1917), England Rugby International, Captained England and Northampton
- Arthur Gilbert Bull (1890–1963), England Rugby International
- Dick Stafford (1893–1912), England Rugby International
- Harold Lindsay Vernon Day (1898–1972), England Rugby International who also played first class cricket for Hampshire
- G.T. 'Beef' Dancer (1911–1991), rugby player who participated in the 1938 British Lions tour to South Africa
- Dickie Jeeps (1930–2016), England Rugby International, Captained England and the British Lions
- Lionel Edward Weston (born 1947), England Rugby International
- Mark Denney (born 1975), rugby union player as centre for Bristol, Castres and Wasps
- Henry Staff (born 1991), rugby union player who played for RFU Championship side, Bedford Blues

=== Rugby fives ===
- Matt Cavanagh (born 1971), Rugby fives British champion in 2004 and 2006

=== Swimming ===
- Hamilton ("Tony") Pierre Matt Milton (born 1938), swimmer at the 1960 Summer Olympics
