= W. C. V. Galwey =

British Army officer (1897–1977)

Brigadier William Charles Vernon Galwey OBE MC & bar
- Born: 1897
- Died: 1977 (aged 79–80); Surrey
- Military career
- Allegiance: United Kingdom
- Branch: British Army
- Rank: Brigadier
- Awards: OBE, MC & bar

Brigadier William Charles Vernon Galwey OBE MC & Bar (1897–1977) was a senior officer in the British Army who served in World War I and World War II.

== Biography ==
Galwey was born on 18 February 1897, the son of Lieutenant-Colonel Charles Edward Galwey and Anne Louisa Valentine. He was educated at Bedford Modern School and commissioned in 1914 in the service of the 18th (Royal Irish) Regiment.

During World War I Galwey was awarded the Military Cross in 1917 and bar in 1918. After World War I he joined the Royal Signals. He fought in World War II where he gained the rank of Brigadier in the service of the Royal Signals. He was appointed successively; Chief Signals Officer Palestine and Trans-Jordan (1939–41), Director of Military Communications, Syria and Lebanon (1941–43), Chief Signals Officer, British Troops in Egypt (1943–44), Chief Signals Officer, Western Command (1944-5), Chief Signals Officer Central Command (India) (1945-6), Chief Signals Officer, Allied Land Forces, South-East Asia (1946–47) and finally commander of the Training Brigade, Royal Signals (1947–50) after which he retired. He was invested as an Officer of the Order of the British Empire in 1941.

Galwey died in 1977 in Surrey.
