= Malcolm Geoffrey Hilson =

Malcolm Geoffrey Hilson OBE
- Born: 28 September 1942
- Education: Bedford Modern School
- Occupation: British Diplomat
- Known for: High Commissioner of Vanuatu (1997-2000)

Malcolm Geoffrey Hilson OBE (born 28 September 1942) was High Commissioner of Vanuatu (1997–2000).

== Life ==
Malcolm Geoffrey Hilson was born on 28 September 1942, the son of Geoffrey and Mildred Hilson. He was educated at Bedford Modern School.

Hilson joined the Foreign Office in 1961 and served in Jakarta, Singapore, Bombay, Kuala Lumpur and in 1982 was First Secretary in Kaduna. Hilson worked in the Foreign and Commonwealth Office (1993–97) and was made High Commissioner of Vanuatu (1997–2000) until his retirement in 2000. He was invested as an Officer of the Order of the British Empire in 2001.

In 1965, Hilson married Marian Joan Freeman; they have two sons.
