= Laurence George Gale =

Sir Laurence George Gale CB OBE
- Born: 25 September 1905; Bedford, Bedfordshire, England
- Died: 8 July 1969 (aged 63); London, England
- Education: Bedford Modern School; Emmanuel College, Cambridge
- Known for: Controller of the Royal Ordnance Factories, War Office (1964-69)

Sir Laurence George Gale CB OBE (25 September 1905 – 8 July 1969) was a British civil servant who was controller of the Royal Ordnance Factories, War Office (1964–69).

== Life ==
Gale was born on 25 September 1905, the son of George Gale. He was educated at Bedford Modern School and Emmanuel College, Cambridge.

Gale was Deputy Director-General of Armament Production (1952–57) and Director-General (1957–64). Between 1964 and 1969 he was Controller of the Royal Ordnance Factories, War Office. He was made an Officer of the Order of the British Empire in 1945 in recognition of his role in organising salvage operations during explosions at the Royal Ordnance Factory, Kirkby, Liverpool, where he was superintendent. The citation stated Gale, "... by his courage and inspiring leadership, completed a unique and terrifying salvage task without a single casualty". He became a Companion of the Order of the Bath in 1960 and a Knight Bachelor in 1968.

Gale married Alice May Canvin in 1931 and they had one son. There is a photographic portrait of Gale at the National Portrait Gallery.
