= Arkyl Staveley Gough =

British surgeon (1900–1990)

Arkyl Staveley Gough OBE OStJ FRCS
- Born: 16 September 1900; London, England
- Died: 23 February 1990 (aged 89)
- Education: Bedford Modern School; Guy's Hospital Medical School
- Known for: Surgeon

Arkyl Staveley Gough OBE OStJ FRCS (16 September 1900 – 23 February 1990) was a British surgeon who made regular contributions to medical journals and served on several medical committees. Also known as A. Staveley Gough, he was made FRCS in 1929, an Officer of the Order of St John of Jerusalem in 1966, and an Officer of the Order of the British Empire in 1975.

== Life ==
Arkyl Staveley Gough was born in London on 16 September 1900. He was educated at Bedford Modern School between 1912 and 1918. In the final months of World War I, Gough entered the Royal Air Force as a cadet pilot officer but was demobilised in 1919 and decided to embark on a career in medicine.

Gough entered Guy's Hospital Medical School where he was a member of the territorial army, attached to the Artists Rifles, and gained a blue in athletics running the half mile for London University. He was made LRCP and MRCS in 1925, BM BS (London) in 1927, and entered into General Practice in Watford. With an ambition to become a surgeon he studied for the FRCS which he passed in 1929. After qualifying he continued his practice in Watford while also conducting surgical work at the Peace Memorial Hospital. When the NHS was formed, he gave up General Practice and became a Consultant Surgeon to hospitals in Watford and the surrounding area.

According to his obituary in the British Medical Journal, Gough's 'forthright opinion and skill in committees soon drew him towards medical politics'. Gough was appointed Chairman of the British Medical Association for the North West Hertfordshire and Watford Division and was a member of its council between 1943 and 1960. Between 1947 and 1960 he was a Member of the North West Metropolitan Regional Hospital Board and was later made Chairman of the Harefield and Northwood Hospital Management Committee, a position he held between 1966 and 1974. Gough also served as Chairman of the Watford and Bushey St John Ambulance Brigade for approximately thirty years.

Gough contributed to several medical journals. In 1966 he was made a Brother of the Order of St John of Jerusalem. In 1975, he was made an Officer of the Order of the British Empire, as Chairman of the Harefield and Northwood Hospital Management Committee.

Gough died on 23 February 1990. He was survived by his wife, Aileen, two daughters and two grandchildren. One of his daughters, Patricia Ann, married Sir Rodney Sweetnam, a distinguished orthopaedic surgeon.
