= Edward Roy Kent =

Edward Kent CBE
- Born: 1 October 1920; Grenada
- Died: 15 May 2009 (aged 88); Carriacou
- Education: Bedford Modern School

Edward Roy Kent CBE (1 October 1920 – 15 May 2009) was an estate owner, manager and agriculturalist in the Caribbean. He was made CBE in 1992 for services to agriculture and in 2007 received an Honorary Doctorate Of Laws from the University of the West Indies for his contribution to agriculture and the welfare of Carriacou and Carriacouans. A keen amateur historian, he was a founder member of the Carriacou Historical Society and was instrumental in raising funds to create the Carriacou Museum. Kent's memoirs, Up Before Dawn, were published posthumously in 2011.

== Early life ==
Edward Roy Kent was born in Grenada on 1 October 1920 and he grew up on the family estate at Morne Fendue in Saint Patrick Parish, Grenada. In 1928 his father purchased estates on Carriacou at Craigston, Mt Pleasant and Limlair. The family would often holiday at Craigston and as a result Kent developed a lasting fondness for Carriacou.

At the age of 12 he was sent to England as a boarder at Bedford Modern School; for the next seven years he only returned to the Caribbean on one occasion. At the end of his schooldays he was returning to Carriacou when he was informed that Britain and Germany were at war. Kent, who was blind in one eye, was unable to fight.

== Career ==
Kent's original intention had been to study law but the outbreak of World War II and the fact that he was unable to fight meant that he entered the family business, initially looking after the estate at Craigston in Carriacou. In the early 1950s, Kent moved back to Grenada where he managed several estates and was elected President of the Grenada Agriculturalists’ Union. In 1957, Kent moved to Saint Lucia where he managed the Dennery Factory Company for the next eleven years, including the manufacture of rum.

The People's Revolutionary Government took control in Grenada and Carriacou between 1979 and 1983. In 1981 Kent was asked to become project manager of St. Lucia Model Farms, ‘a successful land-settlement scheme’. Following the fall of the People's Revolutionary Government, Kent returned to Carriacou in 1985 and as a result of the failure of the lime industry there, he concentrated his estate management skills on livestock breeding and real estate development.

Kent was made CBE in 1992 for services to agriculture and in 2007 received an Honorary Doctorate Of Laws from the University of the West Indies for his contribution to agriculture and the welfare of Carriacou and Carriacouans. A keen amateur historian, he was a founder member of the Carriacou Historical Society and was instrumental in raising funds to create the Carriacou Museum. Kent's memoirs, Up Before Dawn, were published posthumously in 2011.

== Family life ==
Kent married Jean Mancini in 1953 and they had five children. He died in Craigston, Carriacou on 15 May 2009.

== Memoirs ==
Up Before Dawn, by Edward Kent. Published by Sail Rock Publishing, Grenada, 2011
