= William Tudball =

Indian judge

Sir William Tudball
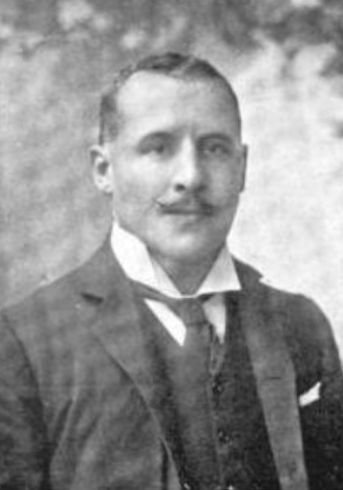
- Born: 15 March 1866; Bombay, British India
- Died: 21 April 1939 (aged 73)
- Education: Bedford Modern School; Christ Church, Oxford
- Occupation: Jurist
- Spouse: Katie Sheen (m. 1889)
- Children: 1

Sir William Tudball (15 March 1866 – 21 April 1939) was an English-born British Indian Puisne Judge of the High Court of Judicature, Allahabad (1909–1922).

== Biography ==
Tudball was born on 15 March 1866, the son of Charles Tudball of Bombay. He was educated in England at Bedford Modern School.

Tudball joined the Indian Civil Service in 1885 and obtained an ICS Scholarship to Christ Church, Oxford in 1887. He was a District and Sessions judge before rising to the rank of Puisne Judge of the High Court of Judicature, Allahabad, India (1909–1922). He was knighted in 1921.

During World War I, Tudball held the rank of Lieutenant-Colonel commanding the 8th Allahabad Rifles of the Indian Defence Force (1916–18).

Tudball married Katie Sheen in 1889 and they had one daughter. He died on 21 April 1939.
