= Walter Ian James Wallace =

British diplomat (1905–1993)

Walter Ian James Wallace CMG OBE
- Born: 18 December 1905
- Died: 17 December 1993 (aged 87)
- Education: Bedford Modern School
- Alma mater: St Catharine's College, Cambridge
- Occupation: Civil Servant
- Known for: Assistant Under-Secretary of State at the Colonial Office (1962-66)

Walter Ian James Wallace CMG OBE (18 December 1905 – 17 December 1993) was Assistant Undersecretary of State at the Colonial Office (1962–66). He was Chief Secretary to the Government of Burma (1946–47).

== Early life ==
Wallace was born on 18 December 1905, the eldest son of David Wallace of Sandgate, Kent. He was educated at Bedford Modern School and St Catharine's College, Cambridge.

== Career ==
Wallace entered the Indian Civil Service in 1928 and was posted to Burma where he became a Deputy Commissioner (1933), Settlement Officer (1934-38), Deputy Commissioner (1939–42) and Defence Secretary (1942–44). He worked in the Military Administration of Burma as Colonel and Deputy Director of Civil Affairs (1944–45) where he was mentioned in despatches. After World War II, he was appointed Chief Secretary to the Government of Burma (1946–47).

In 1947 Wallace joined the Colonial Office where he became Assistant Secretary (1949–62) and Assistant Under-Secretary of State (1962–66) until his retirement.

== Honours ==
Wallace was awarded the OBE in 1943, and was made a Companion of the Order of St Michael and St George in 1957.

== Family life ==
In 1940 Wallace married Olive Mary, fourth daughter of Colonel Charles William Spriggs of Southsea. His wife predeceased him in 1973. Wallace died on 17 December 1993.
