= Roland Lee Knight =

Roland Anthony Lee Knight
- Born: 1917; Fareham, England
- Died: 27 September 1941 (aged 24); Dunkirk, France
- Burial place: Dunkirk Town Cemetery
- Military career
- Allegiance: United Kingdom
- Branch: Royal Air Force
- Service years: 1936–1941
- Rank: Squadron Leader
- Nickname: Tony
- Service number: 37772
- Commands: No. 403 Squadron (1941)
- Conflicts: Second World War: European air campaign †
- Awards: Distinguished Flying Cross

Roland Anthony Lee Knight, DFC (1917 – 27 September 1941) was a fighter pilot and flying ace of the Royal Air Force during the Second World War, credited with six "kills".

== Early life ==
Knight was born in 1917 in Fareham and educated at Bedford Modern School.

== RAF career ==
Knight joined the Royal Air Force in 1936, and was commissioned as pilot officer on 17 February 1937. He was promoted to flying officer on 17 November 1938 and to flight lieutenant on 3 September 1940.

Knight was awarded the Distinguished Flying Cross in 1941 with the following citation:

This officer has shown great personal courage and sound leadership in sweeps over enemy territory. By his dash and consistent courage Flight Lieutenant Knight has set an example to his flight. He has destroyed at least three enemy aircraft and damaged others.

On 21 August 1941 he was promoted to squadron leader and made Commanding Officer of the newly formed No. 403 Squadron at RAF Hornchurch. Shortly thereafter he was shot down on active service over Dunkirk, France on 27 September 1941.

Knight's combat record reads: six kills, three probable kills, three damaged and one destroyed on the ground.
