= Stephen John Wooler =

Stephen John Wooler CB
- Born: 16 March 1948
- Education: Bedford Modern School
- Alma mater: University College London
- Occupation: Barrister
- Known for: HM Chief Inspector, Crown Prosecution Service (1999-2010)

Stephen John Wooler CB (born 16 March 1948) is an English Barrister who was HM Chief Inspector to the Crown Prosecution Service (1999–2010).

== Career ==
Wooler was born on 16 March 1948, the son of Herbert George Wooler and Mable Wooler. He was educated at Bedford Modern School and University College London.

In 1969, Wooler was called to the bar at Gray's Inn, initially in practice at the Common Law Bar (1970–73). In 1973 he joined the Office of Director of Public Prosecutions, eventually becoming HM Chief Inspector to the Crown Prosecution Service (1999–2010). In 2009 he was made a member of the board of the Institute of Criminal Law at University College London and, in 2005, was made Companion Order of the Bath.

In 1974, Wooler married Jonquil Elizabeth Wilmshurst-Smith, with whom he has a son and a daughter.
