= Frederick Reginald Phipps =

Frederick Reginald Phipps OBE A.M. Inst. C.E. F.S.I.
- Born: 7 March 1875
- Died: 9 January 1927 (aged 51); Surbiton, England

Major Frederick Reginald Phipps OBE A.M. Inst. C.E. F.S.I. (7 March 1875 – 9 January 1927) was Senior Engineering Inspector at the Ministry of Transport between 1924 and 1927. After World War I he was awarded the OBE having served as officer in charge of the 311th Road Construction Company in the R.E. under Sir Henry Maybury, and as Deputy Assistant Director of Roads in the XV Corps.

== Life ==
Frederick Reginald Phipps was born on 7 March 1875, the son of Mr. and Mrs. Wilton Phipps. He was educated at Bedford Modern School and King Edward's School, Birmingham.

In 1893, Phipps became pupil and assistant to the borough surveyor of Tewkesbury. In 1897 he was appointed engineering assistant to the City Engineer of Worcester and from 1903 to 1914 he served as borough engineer in Basingstoke.

During World War I Phipps served under Brigadier-General Sir Henry Maybury as officer in charge of the 311th Road Construction Company, Royal Engineers, being later promoted to D.A.D. Roads, XV Corps, with rank as Major and was awarded the OBE.

Upon the establishment of the Ministry of Transport in 1920, Phipps was appointed an engineering inspector and, in 1924, was made Senior Engineering Inspector of the Ministry, a position he held until his sudden death on 9 January 1927 in Surbiton. Phipps left a widow, Lucy Phipps, and four children.
