= John Richard Donovan Glascott =

Chief Engineer of the Burma Railways from 1919 to 1920

John Richard Donovan Glascott CIE
- Born: 10 June 1877; Nuddea, Bengal, British India
- Died: 6 April 1938 (aged 60)
- Education: Bedford Modern School
- Known for: Chief Engineer of the Burma Railways

John Richard Donovan Glascott CIE (10 June 1877 - 6 April 1938) was Chief Engineer of the Burma Railways, later first Agent to the Burma Railways, Port Commissioner for Burma and a Member of the Legislative Council of Burma. He was also an accomplished sportsman who, in his youth, played rugby for the East Midlands, Bedford and the Barbarians and would in later life play cricket for Burma. He also served as Commander of the Burma Railways Auxiliary Force.

== Early life ==
Glascott was born on 10 June 1877 in Nuddea, Bengal, India. He was the son of George Annesley Glascott and Charlotte Ellen Louisa (née Meares), and educated in England at Bedford Modern School, from 1886 to 1895. Glascott was always interested in railways and contributed to the Model Engineer & Amateur Electrician in 1902 at the age of fifteen. After leaving school, he became Captain of the Bedford Wanderers and later became Captain of the Town Club. Glascott played on several occasions for the East Midlands and the Barbarians.

== Career ==
After school, Glascott joined the Queen’s Engineering Works in Bedford and afterwards gained experience with The Tube and the Great Eastern Railway. In 1902 he went to India as an Assistant Engineer to the Bengal Nagpur Railway. In 1904 he was appointed an Assistant Engineer in the Burma Railways, in 1907 became Signals Engineer and in 1911 became Deputy Chief Engineer of the entire rail network. In 1919 he was made Chief Engineer of the Burma Railways.

In 1920, Glascott became Agent of the Burma Railways. In 1926 he was made CIE. In 1929, when the Indian Government took control of the Burma Railways, Glascott became first Agent of the Burma State Railways.

Glascott was also Commander of the Burma Railways Auxiliary Force and played cricket for Burma against Madras and Ceylon. He was reputed to be one of the best billiard players in the country. He retired in 1932.

In 1907, Glascott married Miss O’Reilley Blackwood who survived him.
