= A. P. Ager =

Newspaper editor, manager and publisher

- Born: Albert Powtrill Ager; 27 November 1876; Rotherham, Yorkshire, England
- Died: 17 August 1956 (aged 79); Worthing, Sussex, England
- Occupation: Journalist
- Employer: The Straits Times
- Spouse: Elfrida Lucy de Basagoiti (m. 1902)
- Children: 3 sons 1 daughter
- Parent(s): Alexander Powtrill Ager; Catherine Ann Ellen Wheatley
- Musical career
- Genres: Classical
- Instrument: Violin

Albert Powtrill Ager (27 November 1876 – 17 August 1956) was at various times editor, manager and publisher of The Straits Times. He was instrumental in making The Straits Times the most widely read newspaper in Singapore and largely responsible for the introduction of modern methods of newspaper production in Malaya.

== Early life ==
Ager was born in Rotherham, Yorkshire, on 27 November 1876, the son of Alexander Powtrill Ager and Catherine Ann Ellen Ager (née Wheatley). He was educated at Bedford Modern School.

== Career ==
In 1892, Ager was articled to journalism in Bedford with the Bedfordshire Times and Independent before working on London and provincial newspapers. In April 1898 he moved to Singapore to join The Straits Times in an editorial and commercial capacity.

When Ager arrived at The Straits Times, the newspaper was ‘produced by two coolies turning the handle of the printing machine’ under the editorship of Mr. Arnot Reid. A year later, Ager installed the first oil engine to be used in Singapore for the purpose of newspaper printing. At the time of the Relief of Mafeking, Arnot Reid wrote an article condemning a group of expatriates who had driven to Government House offering their congratulations to Sir Alexander Swettenham but were promptly escorted off the premises by an armed guard. The expatriates expressed their anger with the article, bizarrely through death threats to Arnot Reid; Ager later witnessed the attempted murder of Reid. Fortunately for Reid, the police successfully intervened although the aggrieved expatriates then sought to acquire the newspaper; the newspaper was subsequently sold and Reid removed as editor.

In 1903, Ager was made editor of The Straits Times until the appointment of Walter Makepeace. Ager continued at the paper as General Manager and Assistant Editor until his retirement in 1929. On his retirement, an article in The Straits Times honoured Ager as being largely responsible for the introduction of modern methods of newspaper production in Malaya and for making The Straits Times the most widely read newspaper in Singapore.

== Personal life ==
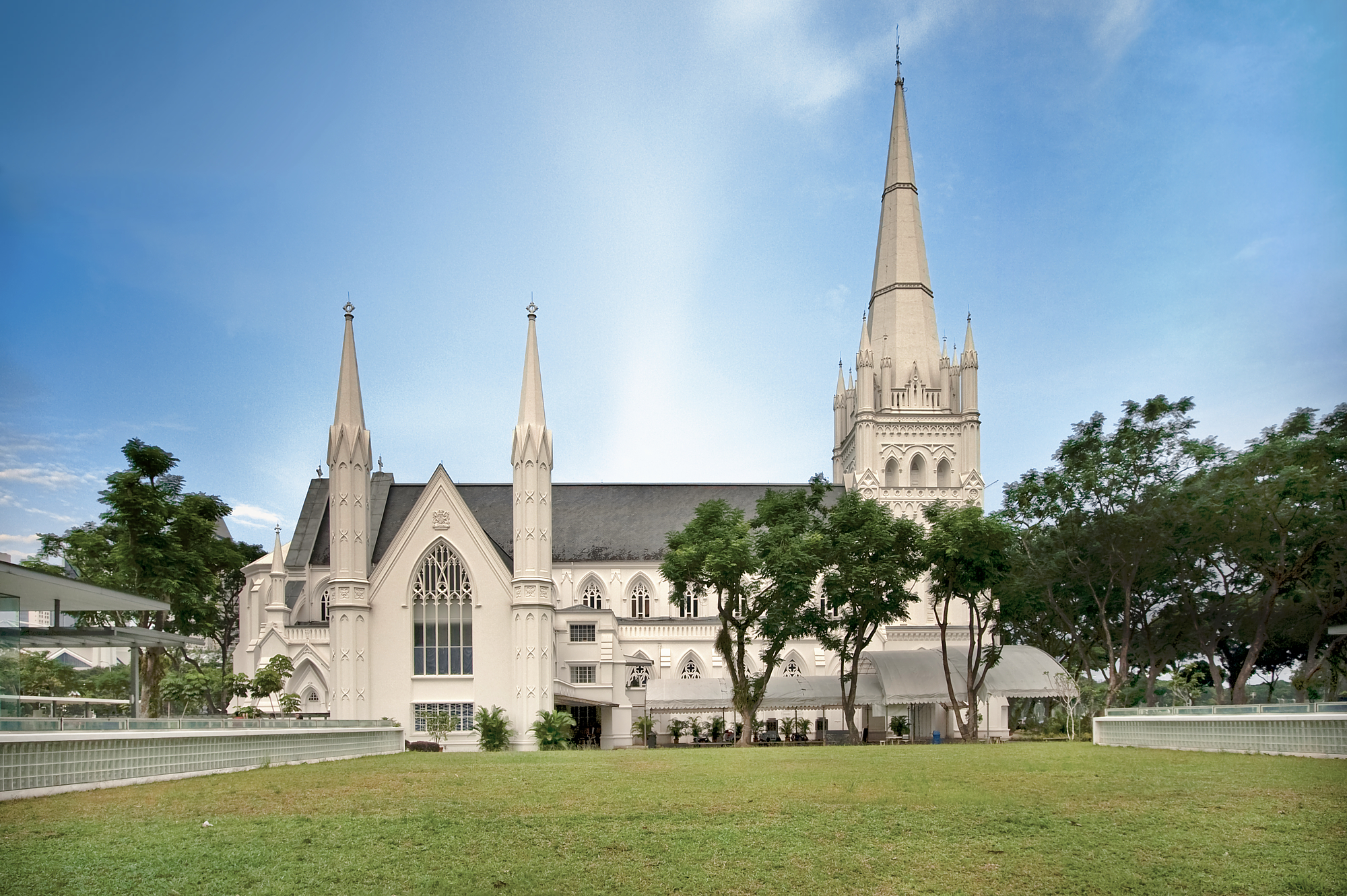
Saint Andrew's Cathedral, Singapore

Outside of work, Ager was an accomplished violinist, regularly performing with the Singapore Philharmonic Orchestra. During World War I he undertook the organisation of several funds for charitable and other purposes and, as an enthusiastic volunteer, was awarded the Colonial Auxiliary Forces Long Service Medal in 1925.

On 9 April 1902, Ager married Miss Elfrida Lucy de Basagoiti at St Andrew's Cathedral, Singapore. After retirement, Ager returned to England and died in Worthing, Sussex on 17 August 1956. He was survived by three sons and a daughter, his wife having predeceased him.
