= William Francis Jackson =

- Born: 1886; Barnsley, England
- Died: 9 August 1964 (aged 77–78); Leeds, England
- Military career
- Allegiance: United Kingdom
- Branch: British Army
- Rank: Lieutenant-Colonel
- Conflicts: World War I World War II
- Awards: OBE; MC&Bar; TD; Mentioned in despatches x2 Legion of Merit; Croix de Guerre; Certificate of Merit, Gallantry and Good Service, Iceland

Lieutenant-Colonel William Francis Jackson OBE MC* TD (1886–1964) distinguished himself in World War I and World War II. He was Signals Liaison Officer to the Headquarters of the United States Army in the United Kingdom during World War II and for his work on communication planning for the liberation of France he was awarded the Legion of Merit and the Croix de Guerre. His obituary described him as ‘a man of courage, resolution and ability, a natural leader, honoured and respected by all’.

== Life ==
William Francis Jackson was born in Barnsley, England, in 1886 and educated at Bedford Modern School. He gained a commission in the Royal Engineers in 1912 and saw service in World War I during the Gallipoli campaign as a Lieutenant in Command of Cable Section ME7. He was invalided from August 1915 to May 1916 after suffering a gunshot wound, was mentioned in despatches and awarded the Military Cross on 2 June 1916.

After his convalescence in hospital, Jackson went to France in January 1917 as Commanding Officer of A Company 3rd Army Signals and, in 1918, was awarded a bar to his Military Cross. He was promoted to Acting Captain in 1918 as second in Command of the 18th Divisional Signals Company before a further promotion to Acting Major and Deputy Assistant Director of the 1st Tank Group Signals.

After the War, he rejoined the Territorial Army with his old company, newly named the 49th (West Riding) Divisional Signal Company, of which he took Command in 1937. He took part in the Narvik Expedition to Norway, and a subsequent expedition to Iceland, after which he was appointed Chief Signals Officer and made Lieutenant Colonel. Jackson was awarded the Territorial Decoration (of which he held five bars) and was made OBE in 1940. He was again mentioned in despatches on 20 December 1940 and on 29 January 1942 he was awarded the Certificate of Merit, Gallantry and Good Service by the General Officer Commanding Iceland.

Jackson was Signals Liaison Officer to the Headquarters of the United States Army in the United Kingdom during World War II and for his work on communication planning in the liberation of France he was awarded the Legion of Merit and the Croix de Guerre.

Jackson retired in 1944 after a fine service record covering 32 years. He died on 9 August 1964 and was buried with full military honours. His obituary described him as ‘a man of courage, resolution and ability, a natural leader, honoured and respected by all’.
