= Rickard William Lloyd =

Rickard William Lloyd MRCS LRCPEd
- Born: 17 March 1859; Gibraltar
- Died: 24 April 1933 (aged 74); Kensington, London, England
- Education: Bedford Modern School
- Alma mater: St Bartholomew's Hospital
- Occupation: Consulting Anaesthetist
- Known for: Anaesthetist; Author

Rickard William Lloyd MRCS LRCPEd (17 March 1859 – 24 April 1933) was a Consulting Anaesthetist and author.

== Early life ==
Lloyd was born in Gibraltar on 17 March 1859, the son of Major Edward Lloyd and the grandson of Sir Robert Stanford. He was educated at Bedford Modern School and St Bartholomew's Hospital, London.

== Career ==
In 1881 Lloyd served as a house-surgeon at the West London Hospital and St Mark's Hospital, subsequently serving at both hospitals for over thirty years. He was also House-Surgeon to St Peter's Hospital for Stone, an Anaesthetist at Guy's Dental School and a former President of the West London Medico-Chirurgical Society. On retiring in 1914 he was appointed Honorary Consulting Anaesthetist of the West London Hospital.

== Authorship ==
The Cult of Old Paintings and the Romney Case

Lloyd was a contributor to various numerous journals, in particular the British Medical Journal. He also took a particular interest in old paintings and was the author of 'The Cult of Old Paintings and the Romney Case', which included a foreword by Sir Edward Poynter. In his foreword to the book Sir Edward Poynter says 'Rickard W Lloyd has set forth in an amusing and interesting way the difficulties that beset the cult of old paintings, to say nothing of the snares'.

== Family life ==
Lloyd was unmarried and died in Kensington, London on 24 April 1933. His obituary was published in the British Medical Journal.

== Selected works ==
- The Cult of Old Paintings and the Romney Case, by Rickard W Lloyd, Published by Skeffington & Son Limited, 1917
- The Field View of the Anaesthetist
