= Wilfrid Stanley Richmond =

Colonel Wilfrid Stanley Richmond CMG MICE (10 August 1881 – 28 January 1962) was a British civil engineer and surveyor who specialised in road design and was Deputy Director of Roads with the British Expeditionary Force during World War I. He was made an Officer of the Legion of Honour and a Companion of the Order of St Michael and St George for his military service during World War I. After World War I he was Divisional Road Engineer at the Ministry of Transport between 1921 and 1945.

== Biography ==
Wilfrid Stanley Richmond was born in Sussex on 10 August 1881, the son of John Richmond of Harpenden, Hertfordshire. He was educated at Bedford Modern School and King's College London.

Richmond served with the Royal Engineers during World War I where he was Deputy Director of Roads with the British Expeditionary Force, attained the rank of colonel, was mentioned in despatches twice, made a Companion of the Order of St Michael and St George and was made an Officer of the Legion of Honour. After the war he was Divisional Road Engineer at the Ministry of Transport between 1921 and 1945.

On 9 March 1909 Richmond married Viola, daughter of John Allen of Brondesbury, with whom he had one son. He died on 28 January 1962.
