= Hugh Chaplin =

English librarian

Hugh Chaplin CB
- Born: Arthur Hugh Chaplin; 17 April 1905; Bexhill-on-Sea, England
- Died: 24 December 1996 (aged 91); London, England
- Education: Bedford Modern School; University College London
- Known for: Principal Keeper of Printed Books at the British Museum

Arthur Hugh Chaplin CB (17 April 1905 – 24 December 1996) was an English librarian who was Principal Keeper of Printed Books at the British Museum. He was a prolific author in the fields of librarianship and cataloguing, working hard to achieve an international standard for cataloguing through participation in the major international conferences of his time.

In 1963, Chaplin was the first non-American recipient of the Margaret Mann Citation in Cataloguing and Classification for ‘his masterly preparation of the Draft Statement of Principles which showed creative insight into universal conditions of bibliographical entry’ and would form the basis of an international agreement reached at the IFLA Conference on Cataloguing Principles held in Paris in 1961.

== Early life ==
Arthur Hugh Chaplin was born in Bexhill-on-Sea on 17 April 1905. He was the son of Herbert Frederick Chaplin, a Wesleyan Minister, and his wife, Florence Bessie (née Lusher). The young Chaplin was educated at Bedford Modern School and later studied Latin at the University of London. After his degree he obtained a Diploma of The School of Librarianship and Archives at University College London. He was demonstrably adept at modern languages and used his skills to great effect as a later interpreter at international cataloguing conferences.

== Career ==
Chaplin's career in librarianship began at the university libraries of Reading and Belfast. He joined the British Museum in 1930 as its Assistant Keeper and was promoted to Deputy Keeper of Printed Books in 1956. In 1959 he was made Principal Keeper of Printed Books and later took charge of the public services of the British Museum Library.

Chaplin was a prolific author in the fields of librarianship and cataloguing, working hard to achieve an international standard for cataloguing through participation in the international conferences of his time. In 1963, he was the first non-American recipient of the Margaret Mann Citation in Cataloguing and Classification for ‘his masterly preparation of the Draft Statement of Principles which showed creative insight into universal conditions of bibliographical entry’ and would form the basis of an international agreement reached at the IFLA Conference on Cataloguing Principles held in Paris in 1961.

Chaplin was made a fellow of University College London in 1969 and Companion Order of the Bath in 1970.

== Personal life ==
Chaplin died in London on 24 December 1996.

== Selected works ==
- Statement of principles: adopted by the International Conference on Cataloguing Principles, Paris, October 1961. Published Sevenoaks, Kent. Distributed by IFLA Secretariat, 1967
- New patterns of national published bibliographies. Published by The British Library, London, 1977
- GK: 150 years of the General Catalogue of printed books in the British Museum. Published by Scolar Press, Aldershot, 1987
