= John Mervyn Dallas Wrench =

John Mervyn Dallas Wrench CIE
- Born: 15 September 1883; Punjab, India
- Died: 31 August 1961 (aged 77); Sherborne St John, England
- Education: Bedford Modern School

John Mervyn Dallas Wrench CIE (15 September 1883 – 31 August 1961) was Chief Engineer of the Great Indian Peninsular Railway and later Chief Controller of Standards of the Railway Board of India from 1929 to 1940. Also known as J. M. D. Wrench, he was made CIE in 1929.

== Life ==
John Mervyn Dallas Wrench was born in Punjab, India, on 15 September 1883. He was the son of John Mervyn Wrench (died 1903) and Fanny Julia van Zuylen van Nyevelt de Gaesebeke. His father was employed as an engineer in British India in 1873, worked for years on various railways there, and was Chief Engineer of the Great Indian Peninsular Railway when he died. Wrench was educated in England at Bedford Modern School.

Wrench entered the Indian State Railway Service in 1906 and steadily rose through the ranks. During World War I he served in Mesopotamia from 1917 to 1919 attaining the rank of Major. After the War he was appointed Locomotive Superintendent of the Indian State Railways in 1921.

Wrench was made Chief Engineer of the Great Indian Peninsular Railway in 1923 and was later appointed Chief Controller of Standards of the Railway Board of India, a position he held between 1929 and 1940. He was made CIE in 1929.

Wrench married Elise Mackenzie-Hughes in 1908 with whom he had four daughters. He died on 31 August 1961 at Sherborne St John, England.
