= Reginald Ruston =

Colonel Reginald Seward Ruston CB
- Born: 1867; Chatteris, Cambridgeshire
- Died: 22 November 1963 (aged 95–96)
- Military career
- Allegiance: United Kingdom
- Branch: British Army
- Rank: Colonel
- Awards: CB; Mentioned in despatches (2)

Colonel Reginald Seward Ruston CB (1867–1963), was in command of the Mounted Infantry of the Devon Regiment in Burma (1891–1903) and served in World War I where he was mentioned in despatches and created a Companion of the Order of the Bath.

== Early life ==
Ruston was born in Chatteris in 1867, the son of Alfred Ruston JP. He was educated at Bedford Modern School and Sandhurst.

== Army service ==
Ruston served with the Devonshire Regiment in Burma (1891–1903), where he was in command of the Mounted Infantry (Medal with clasp). He served in World War I as lieutenant-colonel and colonel where he was mentioned in despatches twice and made a Companion of the Order of the Bath. He retired with the rank of colonel in 1920 and served with the Home Guard (1940–44).

== Family life ==
Ruston married firstly, in 1896, Eva Mary (died 1902), youngest daughter of Major Justinian Armitage Nutt (late Inniskilling Fusiliers) with whom he had two daughters. He married secondly Marion, second daughter of Peter Addington. He married thirdly Esme, second daughter of the Reverend J. Lister Coles, with whom he had one son. He died on 22 November 1963.
