= Rowland Thomas Lovell Lee =

Rowland Thomas Lovell Lee (7 March 1920 – 10 October 2005) was a Recorder of the Crown Court (1979–92) and a published poet.

Lee was born on 7 March 1920, the son of Ronald Lovell Lee, and was educated at Bedford Modern School. He served in the Royal Navy (1939–48) and was a prisoner of war (September 1942-March 1943). After World War II he joined the Bedfordshire Constabulary (1948–52) before training to become a solicitor, qualifying in 1957. He was principal of the practice Wynter Davies & Lee in Hertford (1959–89).

Lee became a Recorder of the Crown Court (1979–92). He also served as Chairman of the Medical Services Committee, Hertfordshire Family Practitioners Committee (1970–77) and of the North Hertfordshire Health Authority (1977–84).

== Poetry ==
Lee was a published poet: Scarecrow Galabieh, 1998; Small Lazarus, 2000; Each Different Beauty, 2001; Your Face at the Window, 2002; Rocking Horse, 2002; Knock on Any Door, 2003; East Wind.

== Family life ==
In 1944, Lee married Marjorie Betty, daughter of the late William Holmes and Clare Johnston Braid Holmes. They had two daughters. Rowland Lee died on 10 October 2005.
