= Michael Tynan =

British paediatric cardiologist

Professor Michael Tynan FRCP

Professor of Paediatric Cardiology, Guy's Hospital
- In office 1982–1999

Personal details
- Born: Michael John Tynan; 18 April 1934 (age 92)

Michael John Tynan (born 18 April 1934) was Professor of Paediatric Cardiology at Guy's Hospital (1982–99) and is a member of Cambridge University’s Paediatric Cardiology Hall of Fame.

Tynan was born on 18 April 1934, the son of Jerry Joseph Tynan (a Squadron Leader in the Royal Air Force) and Florence Ann Tynan. He was educated at Bedford Modern School and the London Hospital.

Tynan was a Teaching Fellow at the Harvard Medical School (1962) and a Senior Assistant Resident at the Boston Children’s Hospital in Massachusetts (1962). He was Registrar of Westminster Hospital (1964) and Registrar (later Lecturer) at Great Ormond Street Hospital (1966). Tynan was also consultant paediatric cardiologist at Newcastle University Hospitals (1971) and at Guy’s Hospital (1977) before taking up his professorship at Guy’s Hospital in 1982.

Tynan married Eirlys Pugh Williams in 1958. He is a member of the Athenaeum Club, London.

== Publications ==
- Paediatric Cardiology, a Textbook, 1983 (jointly)
- Articles on Nomenclature and Classification of congenital heart diseases and on heart diseases in children
