= Arthur Sheppard =

Arthur Sheppard MVO
- Born: 1862; Bedford, Bedfordshire, England
- Died: 21 November 1944 (aged 81–82); Bedford, Bedfordshire, England
- Known for: Private Secretary to the Archbishop of Canterbury (1902-28)

Arthur Sheppard MVO (1862–1944) was private secretary to Archbishop Davidson, who served as Archbishop of Canterbury from 1902 to 1928.

== Life ==
Sheppard was born in 1862, the son of Arthur Sheppard of Bedford. He was educated at Bedford Modern School.

On leaving school, Sheppard was apprenticed to the printing trade at the offices of the Bedfordshire Times. Following a journalistic career he became editor of The Windsor and Eton Chronicle.

In 1889 he became private secretary to Dr. Davidson, then Dean of Windsor. He accompanied Dr. Davidson successively to the sees of Rochester, Winchester and finally, on his appointment as Archbishop of Canterbury, a position he served from 1902 to 1928. He was also secretary of the Cathedrals Commission of the Church Assembly (1925–28) and Secretary of the Tribute to Archbishop Davidson in 1928.

In his book "Cantaur: The Archbishops in Their Office", Edward Carpenter stated that of all Randall Davidson's secretaries 'Arthur Sheppard, who joined his staff in 1899 and retired only in 1923, was pre-eminent'.

Arthur Sheppard married Hannah Elizabeth Grice in 1885 in Bedford. Hannah predeceased him and they had no children. He died on 21 November 1944 in Bedford. Some of Sheppard's correspondence is held at the London School of Economics.

== Selected works ==
- How To Become A Private Secretary. Published by T. Fisher Unwin, 1903
