= Maurice Pugh =

English cricketer

Maurice Douglas Pugh OBE (1903–1986) was an English cricketer who played two first-class matches in India while serving as an officer in the Indian Police Force.

== Career ==
Maurice Pugh was born in Bradford, Yorkshire, on 9 November 1903, and was educated at Bedford Modern School.

He was a middle-order batsman and made his first-class debut for Northern Punjab against Marylebone Cricket Club (MCC) during their inaugural tour to the sub-continent in 1926–27. He was dismissed by the Hampshire's slow left-arm bowler Stuart Boyes for 16. The following season, he appeared for the Punjab Governor's XI against Northern India and was dismissed for 1 in his only innings.

He made two appearances for Bedfordshire in the Minor Counties Championship while on leave in England in 1929.

Back in India, he played further non-first-class matches for the Punjab Governor's XI against Punjab University and Punjab and North-West Frontier Province against the Free Foresters in the 1930–31 season.

Maurice Pugh also played Rugby Union for Bedford.

As a police officer, Pugh rose to become Deputy Inspector General for the North-West Frontier Province. He was awarded the OBE in 1948.

Maurice Pugh died on 30 August 1986 in Bedford, England.
