= Henry Arthur Lester =

Theologian (1873-1922)

The Reverend Henry Arthur Lester MA

Personal details
- Born: 1873
- Died: 1922 (aged 48–49) Muswell Hill, London
- Education: Bedford Modern School
- Alma mater: University of Oxford

The Rev. Henry Arthur Lester MA (1873–1922) was a theologian, author and director of the Bishop of London’s Sunday School Council from 1911 until his sudden death in 1922.

== Life ==
Henry Arthur Lester was born in 1873. He was educated at Bedford Modern School and the University of Oxford as a non-collegiate student where he took honours in Modern History (BA (1895), MA (1899)).

Lester was ordained in 1896 as assistant chaplain of St John's College, Battersea. He was subsequently Vice-Principal of the Warrington Training College between 1898 and 1911. Thereafter Lester became a University Extension Lecturer at the University of Manchester and the University of Liverpool and simultaneously held the position of Director of the Bishop of London’s Sunday School Council between 1911 and 1922.

Lester married Alice Perrin, daughter of John Perrin of Thurnham, Kent. They had three sons and a daughter. Lester died on 24 July 1922 at his home in Muswell Hill, London.

== Bibliography ==
- Catechism: The Life of Faith and Action, by H.A. Lester, E.G. Wainwright and G.H. Dix. Published by Longman’s in 1912, London
- Sunday School Teaching; Its Aims and Its Methods, by H.A. Lester. Published by Longman’s, 1912, London and New York City
- Sunday Schools And Religious Education; sermons and addresses by H.A. Lester and Morley Stevenson. Published by Longman, London, 1913
- Simple Lessons On The Life Of Our Lord, by H.A. Lester and Eveline B. Jennings. Published by Longman, London in 1913
