= Herbert Roff Newton =

Senior Deputy Lieutenant

Commander Herbert Roff Newton OBE DL JP
- Commander H.R. Newton OBE DL JP
- Born: 10 July 1900
- Died: 2 June 1973 (aged 72)
- Military career
- Allegiance: United Kingdom
- Branch: Royal Navy
- Rank: Commander
- Awards: OBE

Commander Herbert Roff Newton OBE DL JP (1900-1973), was a senior officer in the Royal Navy, a Deputy Lieutenant for Bedfordshire and for many years a Justice of the Peace.

== Life ==
Herbert Roff Newton was born in Bedford on 10 July 1900, the son of William Lea Newton and Nellie (née Roff). He was educated at Bedford Modern School

After a period of service in the Artists Rifles, Newton joined the Royal Navy. He was made a Commander in 1946 and, in the same year, was invested as an Officer of the Order of the British Empire. Newton served on several governmental committees and was made Deputy Lieutenant of Bedfordshire in 1961. He was for many years a Justice of the Peace. A keen rugby player, and later a referee, he appeared occasionally for Bedford between 1923 and 1926.

Newton died in Bedford on 2 June 1973. He was survived by his wife, Edith, and a daughter.
