= List of Old St. Beghians =

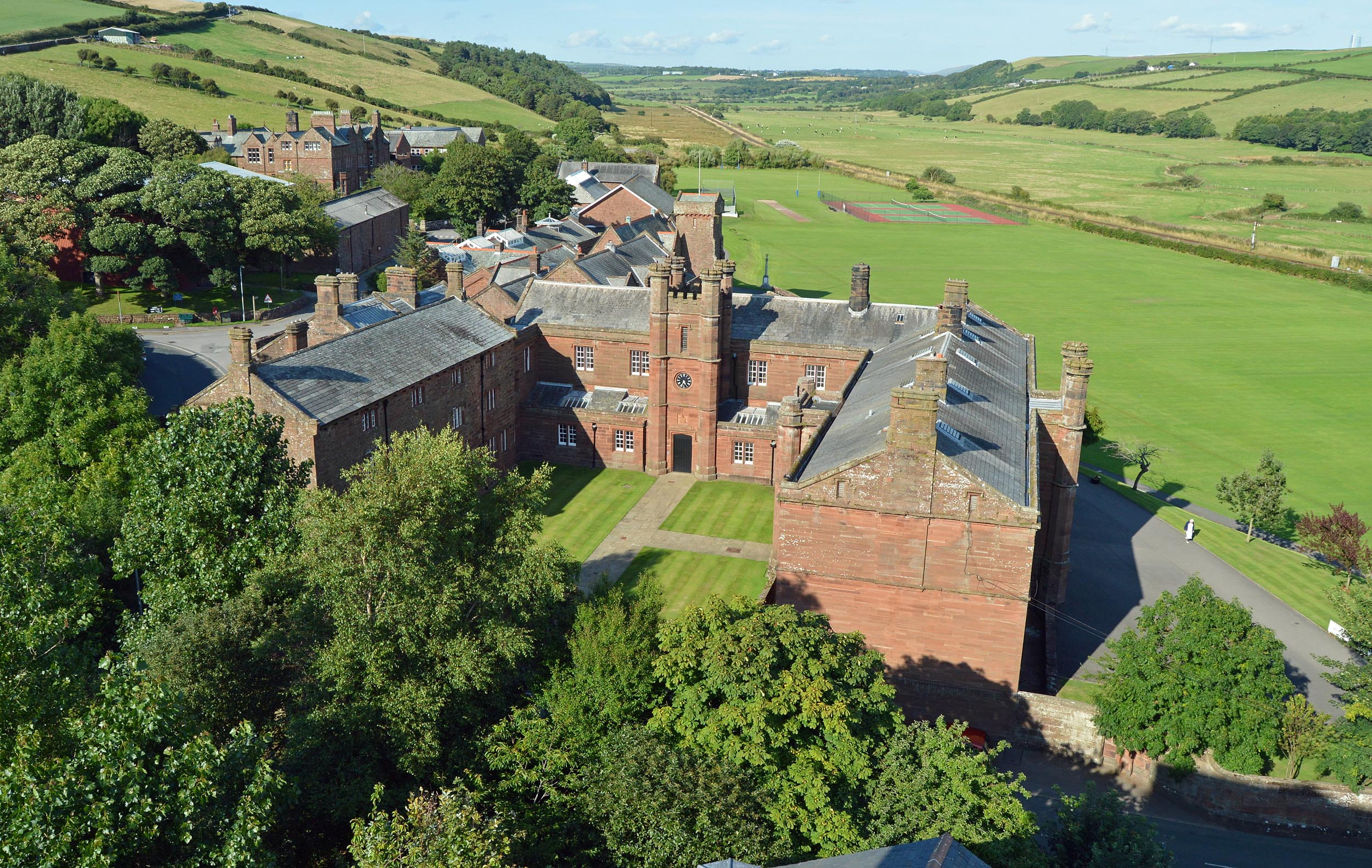
St Bees School, Cumbria, the Foundation block seen from the church tower. The original Elizabethan school is the range on the left of the quad.

Former pupils of St Bees School, a coeducational independent school founded in 1583, are styled Old St Beghians. An "Old St Beghians' Club" was founded in 1908 by master J. W. Aldous, and today as the Old St Beghians' Society it provides a link between old boys (and girls) and the school. Amongst other things it organises an "Old St Beghians Day" once a year, publishes a magazine called the Old St Beghian twice a year and holds and participates in many golfing tournaments. There are several regional branches of the society which traditionally hold annual meals and get-togethers.

== Notable alumni (by order of birth date) ==
- William Benn (1600–1680), a Puritan Divine
- Archbishop Thomas Lamplugh (1615–1691), Bishop of Exeter, and Archbishop of York
- Sir Joseph Williamson (1633–1701), English politician, Secretary of State, the second president of the Royal Society.
- Sir John Lowther, 2nd Baronet, of Whitehaven (9 November 1642 – 17 January 1706), MP for Cumberland 1665 to 1701, and a Lord Commissioner of the Admiralty from 1689 to 1696.
- Thomas Tickell (1686–1740), man of letters and minor poet. Under Secretary of State 1717 to Joseph Addison, contributor to "Spectator" and "Guardian".
- Vincent Perronet (1693–1785), Anglo-Swiss clergyman of the Church of England, vicar of Shoreham, and an early Methodist.
- Rev. William Gilpin (1724–1804), painter and clergyman who helped originate the idea of the picturesque.
- Thomas Postlethwaite (1731–98), Vice-Chancellor of Cambridge University
- Edward Christian (1758–1823), first Downing Professor of the Laws of England, older brother of the notorious mutineer Fletcher Christian.
- Peter Heywood (1772–1831), Royal Navy hydrographer, retired as a captain although he was a pardoned Bounty mutineer. Published the first Tahitian-English dictionary.
- Robert Scott (1811–87), Master of Balliol College, Oxford, joint author of Liddell and Scott's Greek-English Lexicon
- John Peile (1838-1910), Vice-Chancellor of Cambridge University
- George Abraham Grierson (1851-1941), authored and supervised the Linguistic Survey of India.
- John Lindow Calderwood (1888–1960), lawyer and politician
- John Charles Keith Dowding (1891-1965), Commodore of the Merchant men on PQ17 North Russian Convoy
- Lieutenant-General John Hawkesworth (1893–1945), Infantry commander during the Second World War.
- Captain John Fox-Russell (1893–1917), RAMC officer and posthumous Victoria Cross (VC) recipient, killed in Mesopotamia.
- Rev. George Algernon West (1893–1980), Bishop of Rangoon, (1935–1954).
- Captain William Leefe Robinson (1895–1918), Royal Flying Corps officer and VC recipient who shot down the first airship over Britain.
- Captain Richard Wain (1896–1917), Royal Tank Corps officer and posthumous VC recipient, who showed great bravery during the initial advance of the Battle of Cambrai.
- Robert McCance (1898–1993), Professor of Experimental Medicine, Cambridge University.
- Owen Lattimore (1900–1989), noted Sinologist who was accused by Joseph McCarthy of being the top Soviet agent in the U.S.A.
- E.B. Ford (1901–1988), leading ecological geneticist.
- George Rodger (1908–1995), co-founder of Magnum Photos.
- William Frankland (1912–2020), Noted doctor and immunologist who invented the pollen count.
- Air Chief Marshal Sir Augustus Walker (1912–1986), Known as the one-armed air marshal, he lost his right arm in 1942 attempting to rescue crashed Avro Lancaster aircrew.
- General Sir William Scotter (1922–1981), Senior NATO commander, decorated in Burma during WW2. He reviewed the St Bees C.C.F., at St Bees, in 1977.
- Douglas Ferreira (1929–2003), formerly General Manager of the Ravenglass & Eskdale Railway.
- Bryan Pringle, television and film actor
- Alan Birkinshaw (born 1944), film director
- David Pearson (librarian) (born 1955), Director of Culture, Heritage and Libraries at the City of London Corporation
- Rowan Atkinson (b. 1955), comedian, writer, and actor (Blackadder, Mr. Bean).
- Adrian Johnston (born 1961), musician and composer.
- Stuart Lancaster (born 1969), England Rugby coach
- Richard Baker (Scottish politician) (b. 1974)
- Matthew Postlethwaite (b. 1991), actor, singer and artist (Peaky Blinders)

== See also ==
- List of headmasters of St. Bees School
- List of the oldest schools in the United Kingdom
- List of the oldest schools in the world
