= Samuel Hoppus Adams =

British surgeon

- Born: 1835; Yardley Hastings, England
- Died: 1 March 1895 (aged 59–60); Bedford, England

Samuel Hoppus Adams (1835-1895) was a British surgeon, physician and botanist.

== Life ==
Adams was born in Yardley Hastings in 1835 and christened on 21 June 1835. He was educated at Bedford Modern School and matriculated at University College London where he achieved a gold medal in Structural and Physiological Botany. He became a member of the Royal College of Surgeons in 1858, and subsequently studied medicine and graduated MB (first division) in 1859, and MD in 1861.

After graduating, Adams served as a surgeon for The Peninsular and Oriental Steam Navigation Company. During his time there he suffered extreme sunstroke on the Red Sea. He later settled in Bedford where he initially practised in partnership and then independently. He was surgeon to the Bedford Provident Dispensary. In terms of his medical service in Bedford it was commented that:

His position as surgeon to the Bedford Provident Dispensary brought him into contact with a larger number of the humbler classes, by whom he was greatly beloved

In the field of botany, he gave informal tuition to William Hillhouse, Edward Mann Langley and Joseph Reynolds Green, which helped all three to obtain scholarships to Trinity College, Cambridge.

Adams married Caroline England in London in 1880; they had three children. He died in Bedford on 1 March 1895 and was buried in accordance with the rites of the Moravian Church. His obituary in the British Medical Journal stated that:

Dr. Adams was greatly esteemed by his patients as well as by his medical brethren. His unobtrusive and kindly manners, combined with a wide knowledge of many departments of science, procured him many sincere friends. He retained his love of botany throughout life, and we believe that among those who owed their early botanical training to Dr. Adams are to be numbered Professor Hill Owen, of Birmingham, and Professor Green, of the Pharmaceutical Society
