= Joseph Reynolds Green =

British botanist (1848–1914)

Joseph Reynolds Green FRS FLS
- Born: 3 December 1848; Stowmarket, Suffolk
- Died: 3 June 1914 (aged 65)
- Education: Bedford Modern School; Trinity College, Cambridge

Joseph Reynolds Green (1848–1914) was an English botanist, physiologist and chemist whose research into plant enzymes was influential in the development of the discipline of biochemistry. He held the chair in Botany at The Pharmaceutical Society of Great Britain and lectured at the University of Liverpool and Downing College, Cambridge. In 1895 he was elected a Fellow of the Royal Society.

== Early life ==
Joseph Reynolds Green was the son of Daniel Green and was born on 3 December 1848 in Stowmarket, Suffolk. He attended a private school in Huntingdonshire, and, during a period when his father moved to Bedford, Bedford Modern School. He appears to have had little scientific teaching in his early years. In the 1880s the botanist William Hillhouse recalled that, because of the absence of formal scientific teaching at Bedford Modern during his schooldays, he and two other former pupils of the school, Joseph Green and the mathematician and botanist Edward Mann Langley, had been compelled to rent a room in Peel Street in the town in order to undertake experiments in Chemistry, and claimed that their initiative had contributed to all three of them ultimately obtaining scholarships at Trinity College, Cambridge. In addition, all three received informal tuition from Dr Samuel Hoppus Adams, a notable local physician and natural historian. Before Cambridge, however, Green initially pursued a career in business and studied part-time to obtain the degree of B.Sc. from the University of London.

== Career ==
Green entered Trinity College in 1881 and gained Firsts in Parts I and II of the Natural Sciences Tripos in 1883 and 1884. He studied both Botany and Animal Morphology and at that point was drawn to both subjects. In 1885 he was appointed University Demonstrator in Physiology and carried out research into coagulation of the blood and demonstrated that calcium was necessary for the process. In 1887, however, he was appointed Professor of Botany to the Pharmaceutical Society of Great Britain and this dictated the course of his future research. Green came to argue that plant physiology rather than simply plant taxonomy should become the basis of botanical study and he did important work in relation to plant enzymes and the protein content of seeds. Green's approach to botany anticipated the development of biochemistry and his work is now regarded as fundamental to the emergence of the science.

Green was awarded the Rollaston Prize by the University of Oxford in 1890 and was awarded the Degree of Doctor of Science in 1894. He was elected a Fellow of the Royal Society in 1895 and from 1902 he was a Fellow and Lecturer of Downing College, Cambridge. In 1907 he relinquished his Chair at the Pharmaceutical Society because of ill-health and was appointed to the less demanding position of Hartley Lecturer in Botany at Liverpool University. Green was the author of a number of botanical works including basic primers on the subject, accounts of the historical evolution of the subject as well as academic treatises.

Joseph Green served as Deacon at Emmanuel United Reformed Church, Cambridge. He died on 3 June 1914.

== Selected works ==
- Researches on the Germination of the Pollen Grain and the Nutrition of the Pollen Tube (London, 1894)
- A Manual of Botany (London, 1897)
- The Soluble Ferments and Fermentation (Cambridge, 1899)
- Botany (New York, 1909)
- A History of Botany 1860-1900, Being a Continuation of Sachs' History of Botany, 1530-1860 (Oxford, 1909)
- A History of Botany in the United Kingdom from the Earliest Times to the End of the Nineteenth Century (London, 1914)
