= History of St. Bees School =

History of a British school

The History of St. Bees School encompasses more than four hundred years of British history.

It was founded in 1583 as a free grammar school by the dying Archbishop of Canterbury, Edmund Grindal, who refused to resign his position until Elizabeth I agreed to sign the school into existence. After extremely modest beginnings, the school gradually expanded over the years despite its remote location in St Bees, the most westerly point of Northern England. Despite the best attempts of Grindal to give the school a secure financial grounding, the finances have always been characterised by "boom and bust" peaks – for many years the school effectively ran on mining royalties and after these dried up the school had to be rescued from closure by a syndicate of its former pupils. Many Old St. Beghians have served and fought for their country, and the school is extremely proud of the three Victoria Cross winners it educated. During the 1970s St. Bees School became coeducational and until closure had a substantial foreign segment of the pupil population.

The school formally closed in July 2015, though on 20 March 2017 it was announced that the school will re-open in September 2018 in a partnership with Full Circle Education, a South East Asian education group. In April 2018 it was announced that the school would open initially with a cohort of Year 7 students to nurture the culture of the school from the ground up and to establish organic growth year on year. In 2018 summer, it was announced that the new teaching team is in place and the school opening ceremony will be held on 6 September 2018 following a major refurbishment.

== Founding ==
In 1583, the Archbishop of Canterbury, Edmund Grindal, born in the village of St Bees, was ill and blind and was making preparations before his death. Elizabeth I had designated John Whitgift as Grindal's successor, but the former (allegedly) refused to accept the position while Grindal lived. Grindal is accredited with having once described Copeland (the area in which St Bees lies) as the:

ignorantest [sic] part in religion, and most oppressed of covetous landlords of any one part of this realm to my knowledge.

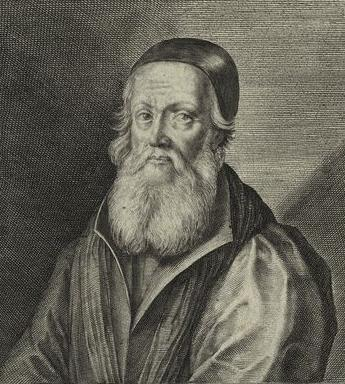
Edmund Grindal, founder of the school

In 1559 Grindal had been appointed Master of Pembroke Hall, Cambridge, a post he held for three years before resigning to concentrate on his duties as Bishop of London. Around this time he started planning for an institution of some kind by purchasing the tithes for St Bees from Sir Thomas Chaloner. The period up to his death in 1583 saw a great number of schools being opened in the wake of the Reformation. In the spring of 1583 Grindal applied to the Queen for letters patent to build a school in St Bees whose land would be held in mortmain. On 3 July 1583 he published a number of statutes for the running of the school, to be named the Free Grammar School, which provided for a board of governors of seven men; the Provost of The Queen's College, Oxford, the Parson of the Parish Church in nearby Egremont who in turn chose five others to serve. However, the Queen refused to sign the request for mortmain, and Grindal for his part refused to resign the archbishopric, though he was fully aware he was incapable of fully carrying out his duties. He finally tendered his resignation on 12 April. The Queen signed the letters patent incorporating St. Bees School on 15 June 1583.

Three days after writing statutes for the school, Archbishop Grindal died on 6 July. In the statutes he had established that the Provost at Queen's College was to select the schoolmaster, but that preference for the applicant was always to be given to a native of the counties Cumberland and Westmorland. However, Grindal had already selected the first schoolmaster for the Free School, Nicholas Copland. In March, 1586 land was purchased from the son of the Thomas Chaloner who had sold Grindal the tithes, Thomas Chaloner the younger, and a building erected at the cost £366.3s.4d. Today that building forms the ground floor of the North block of the "Quadrangle" and serves as one of the school dining rooms. It and the accompanying buildings of the "Quad" are known as "Foundation".

== Early history, 1588–1788 ==
Although specifically incorporated for the education of boys from Cumberland and Westmorland, as early as 1604 the school was attracting pupils from outside Cumberland and Westmorland. The students were being educated at St Bees in the original schoolroom (now one of the school dining rooms) near the Priory Church. The second headmaster, William Briscoe, sent to the board of governors a petition which included the comment; "It may be a fitting school not only for the English, but also to instruct Scots in our language, for which purpose divers Scottish gentlemen have already sent their children to this School". Attracting more pupils was crucial – in its early years the school's complement of pupils never rose above thirty and both Copland and Briscoe had to contend with financial difficulties arising in a dispute between the school and the executors of the late archbishop.

The third headmaster, William Lickbarrow flagrantly abused his position by making his few pupils work on the land and act as servants. The administration of the school property was neglected while Lickbarrow was buying up local land, and the board of governors for various reasons did not meet for years at a time. Eventually Lickbarrow left and was replaced by Francis Radcliffe, who remained in the position from 1630 to 1678. Under his long tenure the school prospered. After two headmasters in eight years, Richard Jackson become headmaster in 1686 and guided the school for the next fifty-two years.

The school had as part of its property the mineral rights to Whitehaven. In 1742 Sir James Lowther managed to extract from the board of governors a lease on the mineral rights for 867 years for the lowly sum of £3.10s per annum. The loss of such potential financial resources (the West Cumbrian mines as run by the Lowthers were very productive) held back the school, but not by much. The 18th century saw a period of continued growth and increasing academic excellence.

== Nineteenth century ==
The school continued to prosper modestly throughout the early years of the nineteenth century. In the nineteenth century the school started to look like it is now. Thanks to a resolution of the mineral rights issue being obtained through the Court of Chancery in 1842, the school was able to physically expand, with what is now the "Quadrangle" being built, Grindal House (formerly a hotel) purchased and the Headmaster's Residence being constructed. At the turn of the twentieth century the School Chapel was built, along with what is now the Art Department and the School Library, and the swimming baths.

In 1812 Headmaster William Wilson began a personal effort to query the Lowther mineral rights, supported by the Provost of Queen's College, Oxford, Septimus Collinson. Wilson himself resigned in 1817, and returned to Queen's College as a fellow. In the thirteen-year tenure of the Rev. Thomas Bradley four hundred boys studied at St. Bees, and to make room the Foundation block was extended upwards and given a new roof in 1820. 1827 saw the school receive its fair share of the mineral rights obtained in 1742. The High Court of Justice ruled the Lowther contract "void" and ordered the current holders of the lease now elevated to the peerage to pay the school £5,000 for coal already mined, as well as £300 a year for the next forty-two years under a safeguarded contract. Due to further dispute, the £5000 was paid into Chancery, and finally released to the school, with substantial investment interest, in 1842.

=== The 1842 Scheme ===
The school's newfound wealth was invested in consols, and by 1842 the amount had risen to a massive £30,000. Under the guidance of headmasters Bradley and the Rev. John Fox (1830–1841), the number of pupils had risen to over one hundred. The Rev. Miles Atkinson (1841–1854) then presided over what was known as "The 1842 Scheme"; sixty boys from Cumberland and Westmorland whose parents could not pay fees were to be boarded and educated at the school at the cost of £20 each. In addition the school was to be able to accommodate ninety day pupils. This necessitated a relatively large expansion of the school facilities, paid for by the windfall from the mineral rights.

On 5 April 1842 the foundation stone was laid for what now encompasses the East and South blocks of the "Quad". The South block became the Headmaster's residence, and one hundred and fifty years later serves as the home of the English and Maths departments and International Centre (previously occupied for many years by the Matron's ward) and a flat. The East block was for many years known as "Big School" and today is occupied by a dining room, classrooms and the Sixth Form Centre. In the centre of the structure is a clock tower, with at the bottom a large entrance door. On the lintel, hewn into the sandstone, is the Latin motto Ingredere ut Proficias; "Enter, that you may become skilled".

In 1848 old boy (alumnus) John Fox, then Provost of Queen's College, Oxford founded an exhibition, funded by £1,000 3 per cent consols. One exhibitioner a year would be given a grant of £30 per annum for a four-year course of study at Queen's, so long as they were from Cumberland (preferably) or Westmorland.

The curriculum at this time was mostly classical although attention was paid to English. Not until the 1850s were the "modern" languages French and German introduced for study. By 1854 the tally of students had risen to over one hundred and fifty. Times changed, and in 1870 a new lease was negotiated with the Lonsdale family, with an increased dead rent of £500 per annum and 6d royalty per ton. Despite the school's wealth and academic lustre, the Education Commissioners for Cumberland recommended in the 1870s that St. Bees cease teaching Ancient Greek and therefore become a "second rate school".

=== The 1879 scheme ===
In 1879, having deflected the attempt of the education board to lower the status of the school, another scheme was promulgated by those connected with St. Bees. The school ceased to be a "Free" one, and the structure of the board of governors was altered for the first time in centuries. Queen's College, Oxford and Pembroke College, Cambridge now appointed two governors each onto the board; one governor was appointed by the magistrates of Cumberland and one by the trustees of Whitehaven (Town and Harbour).

The school, now named simply St. Bees Grammar School, continued to expand, with the current headmaster's residence and school house being constructed in 1886. The Station Hotel, lying on the south side of the railway line, was purchased in 1888 and opened as another boarding house. At the same time the original school room, now the "hot room", was extended and the ceiling heightened.^{[a]} While this was facilitated the boys took their meals at the Hotel. The Cricket Pavilion was erected in 1893 in a mock-Tudor style; today it is painted in an attractive coating of white.

== Twentieth century ==
=== Inception of the Officer Training Corps ===
In September, 1903 the school formed a Cadet Company in the 3rd Volunteer Battalion of the Border Regiment in the Volunteer Force. Initially founded with a strength of sixty members, by the summer of 1904 it had increased to seventy-eight. When in 1908 as part of the Haldane Reforms the Volunteer Force was reorganised, the school's "Corps" (as it had become known) became an independent company, until Spring Term of 1910 when it became a contingent of the Junior Division of the Officer Training Corps.

The corps was officered by masters at the school, and regularly attended camps with northern public schools and also the annual Public Schools Camp. In 1910 a Drum and Fife band was set up, which soon changed to bugles. In later years the Corps band would win the music competition at the annual camp on four separate occasions. By 1912 the Corps would reach an impressive number of one hundred and fifty members, half of the student population.

=== The First World War ===
Upon the outbreak of the First World War many Old St. Beghians joined the Army through their connection with the School's O.T.C. or were called up. No fewer that nine-hundred and eighty seven Old St. Beghians served during the war, as well as a number of past and then-current masters. Many old boys were awarded the Military Cross for bravery and one, Alfred Critchley became one of the youngest Brigadier-Generals in the British Army. One hundred and eighty old boys were killed during the war, as well as four former masters of the school. By the outbreak of the First World War the school had reached a peak of three hundred pupils, a figure which would not be seen again for some years.

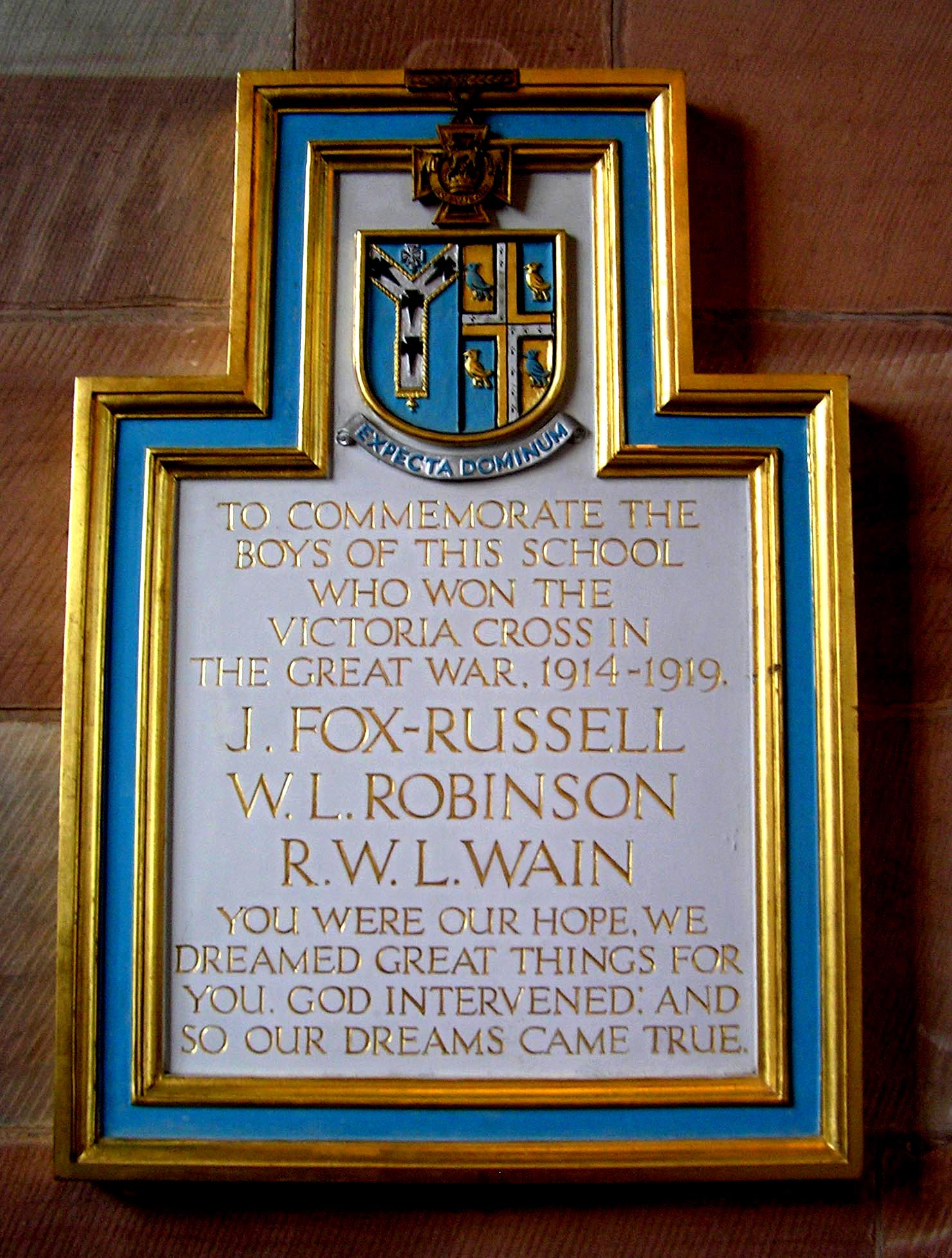
The VC memorial in the school chapel.

During the Great War three old boys of the school were awarded the Victoria Cross, the highest award for military gallantry in Britain and many of the British Commonwealth countries (see St. Bees V.C. winners for more details. Old boy Alfred Critchley became one of the youngest Brigadier-Generals in the British Empire at the age of twenty-seven for his heroic conduct (he was older than Roland Boys Bradford, V.C. but younger than Bernard Freyberg, V.C.). One hundred and eighty old boys gave their lives during the war, and a special memorial was built overlooking the sports fields where so many had previously played.

After the war the number of students remained high, but in common with many other schools the numbers decreased and then went into free-fall during the 1930s. The situation became so critical that the Governors of the School attempted to have the school nationalised. In the end, the old boys put together a rescue package and the school remained independent, it being the only one of its kind at the time in Cumberland and Westmorland.

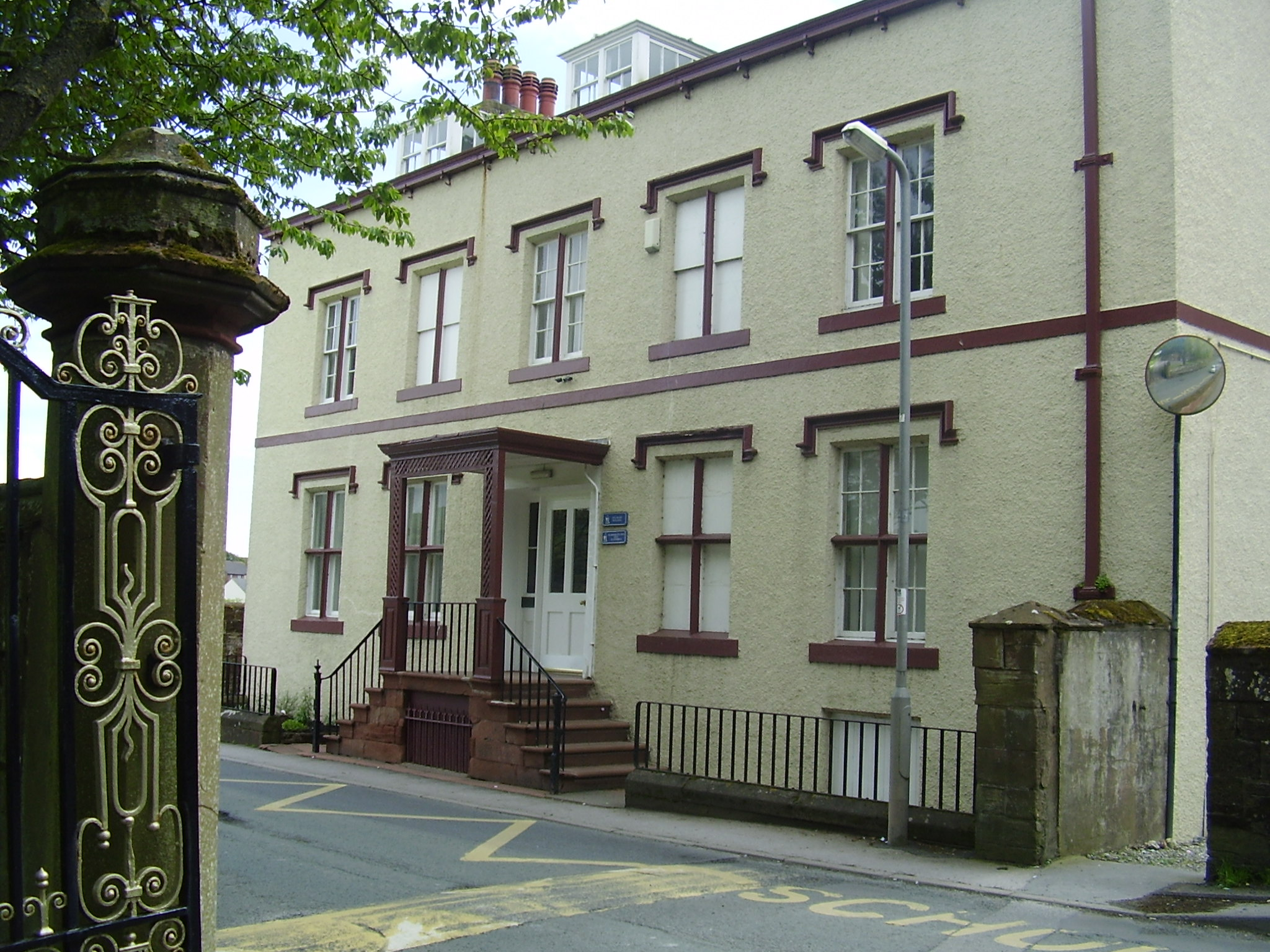
The refurbished Fox Music Centre.

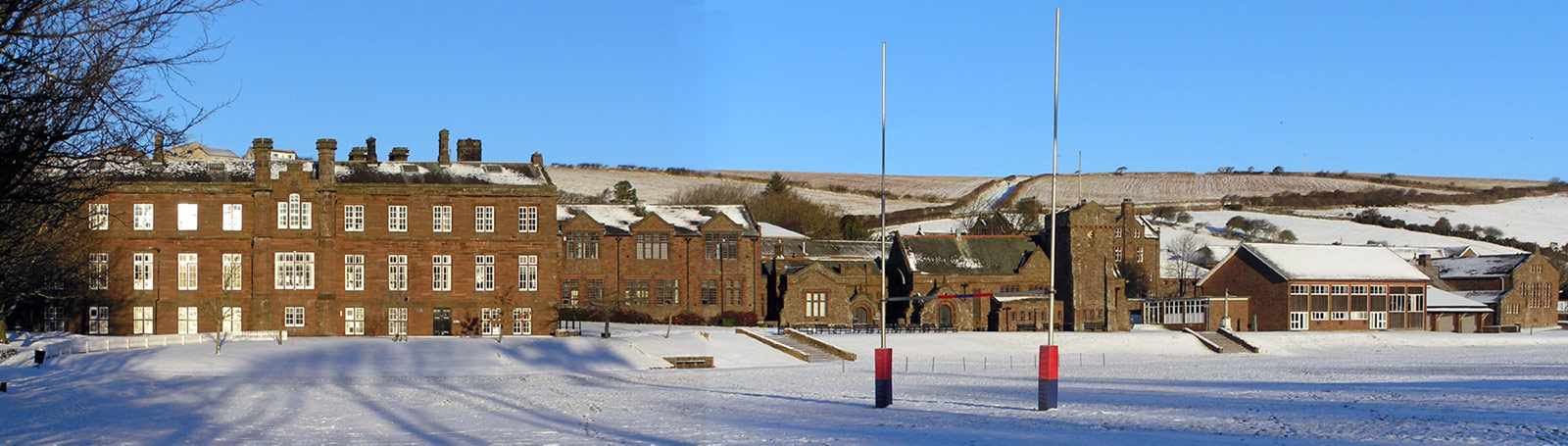
St. Bees School, Cumbria, seen from the edge of the "Firsts" in winter

In 1938, during the final stages of recovery from the Great Depression, the school's headmaster of the day, George Mallaby, made an unusual career move by becoming District Commissioner for the special area of west Cumberland, with the task of alleviating the problems of unemployment.

During the Second World War Mill Hill School was evacuated to St. Bees after the latter's buildings in London were occupied by the government. The two schools remained independently run, but sports teams from each school would frequently play each other. The cadet corps of the two schools combined with village volunteers to form the St. Bees Home Guard, resulting in the group being much earlier equipped than many other Home Guard groups, as the cadets from both schools already had the necessary equipment.

==== Victoria Cross Holders ====
During the war three Old St. Beghians won the Victoria Cross, Britain's highest award for valour in the "face of the enemy". Two were awarded posthumously.

===== Captain W.L. Robinson, VC, RAF =====
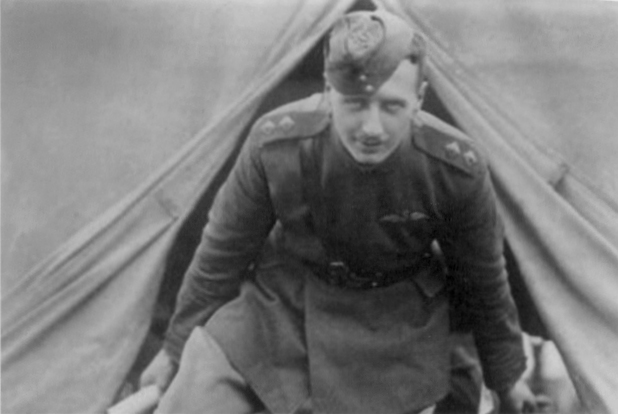
William Leefe Robinson

Lieutenant (later Captain) William Leefe Robinson (Eaglesfield 09-14) was the first man to shoot down a German rigid airship over Britain. On the night of 2 September 1916 he intercepted the German airship S.L.11 (a wooden-framed contemporary of the Zeppelin) and shot it down over Cuffley. For such a notable feat, he was the first Old St. Beghian to be awarded the Victoria Cross, the citation reading;

For most conspicuous bravery. He attacked an enemy airship under circumstances of great difficulty and danger, and sent it crashing to the ground as a flaming wreck. He had been in the air for more than two hours, and had previously attacked another airship during his flight.

Afterwards Robinson was transferred to the Western Front and in May, 1917 he was taken prisoner by the Germans and was held as a prisoner of war until the end of the war. He made several attempts to escape and his health had deteriorated to such an extent that shortly after his repatriation to Britain he succumbed to Spanish Influenza on 31 December 1918.

===== Captain John Fox-Russell, VC, MC, RAMC =====
John Fox-Russell

Captain John Fox-Russell (Foundation 08-10) was killed in action on 6 November 1917 during the Sinai and Palestine Campaign. He had been a most promising pupil at St. Bees, having left to study medicine at the Middlesex Hospital aged only sixteen. At the beginning of the war he was commissioned into the Royal Welsh Fusiliers, but was seconded to complete his medical studies. He joined the Royal Army Medical Corps and became Medical Officer of a battalion of the Royal Welsh Fusiliers in Egypt. He had already been awarded the Military Cross for his services during the First Battle of Gaza in March, 1917. He was posthumously awarded the Victoria Cross for:

most conspicuous bravery displayed in action. Until he was killed he repeatedly went out to attend the wounded under murderous fire from snipers and machine-guns, and in many cases, when no other means were at hand, carried them in himself, although almost exhausted. He showed the greatest possible degree of valour.

===== Captain R.W.L. Wain, VC =====
Captain Wain (School House 11-14) had been on track to study at Oxford when war was declared in 1914. He promptly joined up through the Public Schools Battalion. Having participated in the opening stages of the Battle of the Somme with the Manchester Regiment, later in the year he transferred to the Tank Corps. In a tank at the beginning of the Battle of Cambrai on 20 November 1917 Wain would posthumously receive the VC for;

most conspicuous bravery in command of a section of tanks. During an attack the tank in which he was, was disabled by a direct hit, near an enemy strong point which was holding up the attack. Capt. Wain and one man, both seriously wounded, were the only survivors. Though bleeding profusely from his wounds, he refused the attention of stretcher-bearers, rushed from behind the tank with a Lewis gun, and captured the strong point, taking about half the garrison prisoners. Although his wounds were very serious, he picked up a rifle and continued to fire at the retreating enemy until he received a fatal wound in the head. It was due to the valour displayed by Capt. Wain that the inf[a]ntry were able to advance.

==== War honours ====
War Honours of St. Bees School
Award	VC	CMG	DSO	OBE	MBE	MC	DFC	AFC	DCM	MM	MID
-	3	2	14	4	1	89	5	1	2	6	94
Bar(s)	-	-	1	-	-	10	-	-	-	-	10

=== Post-war ===
On 18 February 1923 a fire started in Foundation House, causing extensive damage throughout the East side of the Quadrangle. Fortunately, no one was hurt, and the damage was repaired.

On 9 June 1924 the School O.T.C. sounded the "Last Post" in a moving ceremony at the top of Great Gable, a mountain at the heart of the Lake District, where a memorial was unveiled in commemoration of twenty members of the Fell and Rock Climbing Club of Great Britain who had given their lives in the war.

Wednesday, 29 June 1925 saw a visit to the school by the Prince of Wales (Edward VIII), on the same day as a solar eclipse. He was welcomed to the school by the Headmaster, Edward Allen Bell, Lord Lonsdale and the Bishop of Carlisle, Henry Williams. While there he toured the grounds, and then opened a new squash court which had been constructed in the courtyard of Barony House, and took tea with the school prefects. Instead of a speech to the assembled boys, he told them instead that it had been arranged for the summer holidays to be extended by one week in honour of his visit, which elicited loud cheers.

In 1928 the School held a two-day pageant celebrating the history of the school and the village in acted representations of twelve episodes. Among them was the founding of the school by Edmund Grindal, and also the alleged landfall of Saint Bega at St. Bees.

=== Failed Speech Day Bombing, 1932 ===
The Speech Day for 1932 was set for Saturday, 18 June, and the prizes were to be given out by Lord Lloyd, a Conservative politician and former Governor of Bombay in the British Indian Empire. On the same day Lord Lloyd was also to unveil a memorial to the school's three Victoria Cross winners from World War I in the school chapel. The prizes were distributed in the afternoon in a marquee erected for the occasion; Lord Lloyd being sat on a raised platform with the Chairman of the Board of Governors, the Bishop of Carlisle, and the Headmaster. During the proceedings the latter two men heard an odd sound beneath them but paid it no heed. In the evening two boys looking around the area where the Bishop had sat found a box, which was taken to the Headmaster, who was dining with Lord Lloyd and 6 old boys. The box contained two metal cylinders attached to a clock dial, set for 3:30 - the time at which Lord Lloyd had been giving prizes out. The local police were notified; the Chief and Deputy-Chief Constables of the Cumberland and Westmorland Constabulary made their way to St. Bees to study the device. The Metropolitan Police was informed^{[b]}, and the Home Office sent a holidaying explosives expert to ascertain the nature of the box. It had been thought that the whole affair was a malicious hoax, but the Home Office Inspector, Dr. H. E. Watts, declared on the 20th that it was indeed a bomb, and the work of an expert. Watts then took the bomb to London for laboratory testing.

The investigation proceeded with Special Branch and local police officers making inquiries in London and in the area around St. Bees. Lord Lloyd was put under uniformed police protection for the remainder of the case. On 19 July two brothers from Macclesfield were served summonses. Maurice E. Davenport, 25, and Basil H. Davenport, 29, appeared before the Whitehaven magistrates on 25 July and were charged under the Explosive Substances Act 1883 with intent to cause injury to property. The device, which was described in detail in court, turned out to be not as powerful as previously stated (Watts had said that it could kill 20 people), but had a powerful enough black-powder charge with which to set afire the speaker's platform. The Magistrates ruled that the evidence was not sufficient to proceed to trial and the summonses against the two brothers were dropped. The affair was ruled as an audacious hoax.

However, in 1955 the spectre of attempted assassination was raised once again. In Singapore during the Malayan Emergency a warehouse had been burnt out and arson suspected. The night-watchman, an elderly Indian who was believed to be connected to a revolutionary group which terrorised merchants for money, was questioned by police. He confessed to setting a bomb which burned down the warehouse, and then suddenly claimed that he had once been a member of a group pledged to killing Lord Lloyd. He claimed to have manufactured a bomb, travelled to Cumberland disguised as a peddler and planted the bomb at St. Bees School under the cover of darkness. Twenty years after the "Speech Day Bombing", and on the other side of the world, the old man's story was dismissed as untrue boasting. For bombing the warehouse the night-watchman was sentenced to a long term of imprisonment but was killed in jail less than two months into his term of sentence. The bomb incident officially remains a hoax.

=== Rest of the 1930s ===
In the early morning of 25 November 1932 the school suffered yet another fire in Foundation House. A dormitory, study and changing rooms were totally gutted a conflagration which took more than two hours to be put out by the school fire brigade and the Whitehaven Fire Brigade. The fact that the boys had attempted to put the fire out themselves garnered a mention in The Times. In 1937, representatives from the school were included in the 27-strong "School Empire Tour of the Union of South Africa", organised by the Royal Empire Society.

=== Financial crisis and the Second World War ===
On 2 April 1938 the board of governors announced that the school would have to shut in a year unless the Cumberland Education Committee stepped in to provide funds. The mineral royalties which had secured the financial independence of the school for so long had finally ceased to be paid, and the number of pupils had dropped from a '20s peak of 350 to 100. In June members of the Old St. Beghians Club met and resolved to do all in their power to keep the school open. On 2 July 1938 a deputation from the club presented the governors with a plan for keeping the school open, due in most part to a provision of funds provided by former pupils of the school. By 14 July it was declared that the Board of Education and the Cumberland Education Committee had approved the scheme.

==== The new scheme and the Second World War ====
Previously fees at the school were £130 per annum. The new rate for boarding and tuition was changed to 95 guineas (£99.75). Boys from Cumberland and Westmorland enjoyed a further reduction in rates. This drastic change was made possible by the donation, by January 1939 of £21,000 in guarantees and subscriptions (equal to roughly £800,000 in today's money). Spread over 5 years, the yearly guarantee for the School was brought up to £2,800. The school was thus able remain open and make itself a more attractive prospect for parents.

Upon the declaration of war with Germany on 3 September 1939, Mill Hill School in northern London was requisitioned by the government for use as a hospital. The Governors of St. Bees agreed to share the still somewhat-understrength school to be shared with the pupils and staff of Mill Hill, and by the end of the month the boys of Mill Hill were being taught in Cumberland.

During the course of the war seventy-two old boys (alumni) gave their lives for their country. Their names are commemorated on a tablet in the Chapel unveiled on 19 June 1949 by the Reverend Leslie Dixon, Chaplain-in-Chief of the Royal Air Force, himself an old boy of the school.

=== Post-war ===
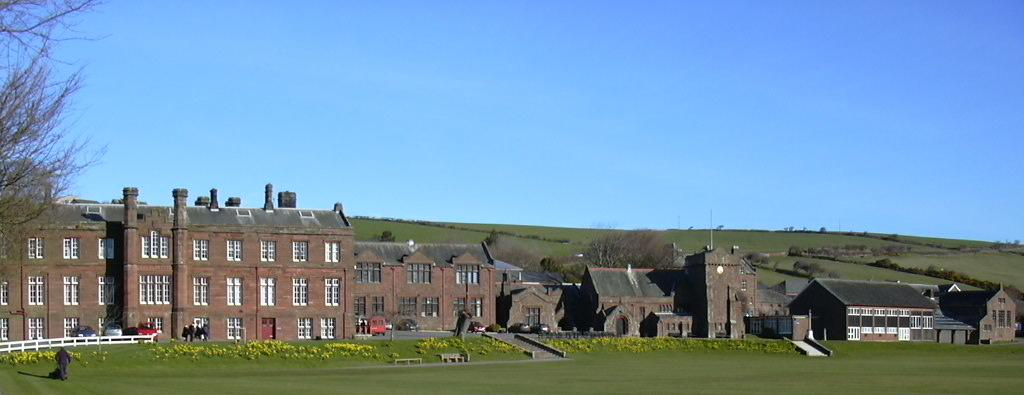
St. Bees School, Cumbria, seen from the edge of the "Firsts"

To further commemorate the sacrifice made by Old St. Beghians during the recent war, it was decided to build an assembly hall for the school. In 1946 an appeal was launched and £10,000 was raised. Plans were drawn up by A.C.R. Johnston, an old boy, for the new hall, and construction began in 1953 while the balance of the £25,000 needed was raised. Today the Memorial Hall acts as an assembly area, theatrical venue and examination hall. In 1955 the noted sculptor Josefina de Vasconcellos created a sculpture symbolising peace and goodwill named The Hand, which stands outside the Memorial Hall. In this period a new fully equipped science building, faced in the red sandstone which characterises the school, was built on Wood Lonning at the end of School House Lane. This New Block was formally opened by Barnes Wallis in 1959.

During the 1950s a new science block was built, formally opened by Barnes Wallis in 1959, and in the 1970s the school became coeducational. New boarding houses were purchased for both girls and boys, Bega House and Abbot's Court respectively, and to celebrate the school's quatercentenary in 1983 an appeal was launched which would give the school a new sports hall, opened in 1988.

In 1977 the school became fully co-educational, after accepting some sixth form day girls previously. Preparations for the quatercentenary of the school were extensive. On 2 December 1982 before the end of term, the Archbishop of Canterbury Robert Runcie gave the thanksgiving in the Priory Church of St. Mary and St. Bega. On 28 June 1983 a new Senior Girls' House, Lonsdale House, was opened on Lonsdale Terrace by The Princess Anne who then toured the building.

In 1984, St. Bees School came into the national spotlight with the broadcasting on BBC 2 of the documentary Educating Michael, which focussed partially on Michael Light, the son of a Barrow-in-Furness shipyard worker, who was being educated at the school thanks to the Thatcher government's Assisted Places Scheme, whereby bright children were sent to public schools and their fees were fully or partially subsidised by the state.

In 1996 Grindal House was turned into an "International Centre", where students from the Far East could be taught English and other subjects outside the mainstream teaching environment of the school. In 2000 this policy was ended, and the teaching area of the International Centre was transferred to the former Matron's area in Foundation. Grindal became once again a day and boarding house, this time for senior boys.

Also in 2000 Barony House was entirely refurbished after years of neglect and updated into a state-of-the-art musical facility. For years the school had prided itself on the standard of musical tuition it afforded pupils, and with the opening of the Fox Music School this was finally realised. The building, apart from practice rooms and a recording studio also contains conventional teaching spaces.

=== Post-war expansion ===
The 1990s saw the opening by Prince Charles of the Whitelaw Building, a multi-function business centre and teaching area which was named after the-then Chairman of the Board of Governors, William Whitelaw. In 2000, Barony House was entirely refurbished and renamed the Fox Music Centre in memory of old St Behgian Bill Fox. To mark the millennium, a time capsule was buried in the North-East corner of the Quadrangle.

In September 2008, a Preparatory Department was launched, catering for pupils from the age of 8 until they joined the main school. At this time, a nearby independent school with a prep department, Harecroft Hall, had just closed. The school again expanded in September 2010 to include pupils from age four.

== Closure and planned re-opening ==
On Friday 13 March 2015, it was announced by the School Governors that due to the harsh financial climate, and falling pupil numbers and the cost of their school fees, the school would close in Summer 2015. In response a four-point rescue plan was proposed on 23 March by a "rescue team" made up of interested stakeholders.

The plan consisted of....

- 1) Work on a legal mechanism to take control from the current board of governors
- 2) Rescind the current closure notice and replace with a preliminary closure notice to the Summer Term of 2016.
- 3) Use the next nine months to raise funds and to develop a supported and sustainable business plan for the school
- 4) Throughout this period post frequent updates on progress on the website and issue a substantive interim report of progress before the end of the Summer Term. Then by Christmas term 2015 formally confirm or withdraw the preliminary closure notice based on the success of the rescue business plan.

Nonetheless, on 17 April 2015 it was confirmed by the governors that the school would close. The formal statement said the governors are also trustees of the St Bees Foundation and they said they are committed to it having a future in education in west Cumbria and "to the use of the site as support both for the future activities of the foundation and the village of St Bees."

The school formally closed in July 2015, though there were hopes for a reopening of the school in the near future. The last headmaster before closure was James Davies, from September 2012 to July 2015.

On 5 May 2017 the Trustees announced that the headteacher designate was Jeremy Hallows, who was then head of the Senior School at Bromsgrove School.

In April 2018 it was announced that the school would open initially with a cohort of Year 7 pupils, nurturing the culture of the school from the ground up and to allow organic growth year on year.

=== Re-establishment ===
On 29 June 2018, it was announced that the new teaching team was in place and the school would be re-opening on 6 September 2018 following a major refurbishment. Initially opening with lower year groups intake, in the following years the school will expand and will provide continuous education on the same campus for boys and girls aged 11–18. A complete refurbishment of certain buildings had undertaken. The teaching team had revised schemes of work and produced a brand new curriculum for pupils. The curriculum was formed based on the Fusion Pr ogramme, which enables pupils to access eastern and western educational philosophies.

In July 2018, Induction Day and Super Learning Day were hosted at St Bees School. The staff had prepared different activities ranging from sports, science, team-building, outdoor games and language learning. Preparations for the launching of the revitalised St Bees School continue at a pace.

== Notes ==
a. The first floor, which today accommodates the Sixth Form Centre, the Careers Centre and the Old St. Beghians Office, has a noticeably lower ceiling due to its floor being raised.

b. "Something in the nature of a bomb was found after Lord Lloyd had spoken at St. Bees School, but until it has been examined by an expert it is not possible to say whether it is a real bomb or a fake." - Chief Constable P.T.B. Browne

== Reference list ==
- Aldous, M.A., J.W. (1921). St. Bees School Roll of Honour and Record of Service. Edinburgh: University Press.
- Special Committee, Old St. Beghians' Club (1939). London: Buck & Wooton, Ltd.
- Strype, M.A., John (1710). The History of the Life and Acts of the Most Reverend Father in God, Edmund Grindal. London: Wyat and Hartley.
- White, John Baker (1957). Sabotage is Suspect. London: Evans Brothers, Ltd.
