= Automedian triangle =

An automedian triangle (black) with side lengths in the proportion 13:17:7, its three medians (brown), and a triangle similar to the original one whose sides are translated copies of the medians

In plane geometry, an automedian triangle is a triangle in which the lengths of the three medians (the line segments connecting each vertex to the midpoint of the opposite side) are proportional to the lengths of the three sides, in a different order. The three medians of an automedian triangle may be translated to form the sides of a second triangle that is similar to the first one.

== Characterization ==
The side lengths of an automedian triangle satisfy the formula $2a^2=b^2+c^2$ or a permutation thereof, analogous to the Pythagorean theorem characterizing right triangles as the triangles satisfying the formula $a^2+b^2=c^2$.

Equivalently, in order for the three numbers $a$, $b$, and $c$ to be the sides of an automedian triangle, the sequence of three squared side lengths $b^2$, $a^2$, and $c^2$ should form an arithmetic progression. That is, $b^2-k = a^2$, and $a^2-k = c^2$ (for example, if $b=17$, $a=13$, and $c=7$, then $k=120$: $17^2-120 = 13^2 = 169$, and $13^2-120 = 7^2 = 49$).

== Construction from right triangles ==
If $x$, $y$, and $z$ are the three sides of a right triangle, sorted in increasing order by size, and if $2x<z$, then $z$, $x+y$, and $y-x$ are the three sides of an automedian triangle. For instance, the right triangle with side lengths 5, 12, and 13 can be used to form in this way an automedian triangle with side lengths 13, 17, and 7.

The condition that $2x<z$ is necessary: if it were not met, then the three numbers $a=z$, $b=x+y$, and $c=y-x$ would still satisfy the equation $2a^2=b^2+c^2$ characterizing automedian triangles, but they would not satisfy the triangle inequality and could not be used to form the sides of a triangle.

Consequently, using Euler's formula that generates primitive Pythagorean triangles it is possible to generate primitive integer automedian triangles (i.e., with the sides sharing no common factor) as
$$\begin{align}
a&=m^2+n^2\\
b&=m^2+2mn-n^2\\
c&=|m^2-2mn-n^2|\\
\end{align}$$
with $m$ and $n$ coprime, $m+n$ odd, and to satisfy the triangle inequality $n<m<n\sqrt{3}$ (if the quantity inside the absolute value signs is negative) or $m>(2+\sqrt{3})n$ (if that quantity is positive). Then this triangle's medians $t_a, t_b, t_c$ are found by using the above expressions for its sides in the general formula for medians:
$$t_a = \sqrt {\frac{2 b^2 + 2 c^2 - a^2}{4} }= \frac{a\sqrt{3}}{2}, \qquad t_b = \sqrt {\frac{2 a^2 + 2 c^2 - b^2}{4} }= \frac{c\sqrt{3}}{2}, \qquad t_c = \sqrt {\frac{2 a^2 + 2 b^2 - c^2}{4} }= \frac{b\sqrt{3}}{2},$$
where the second equation in each case reflects the automedian feature $2a^2=b^2+c^2.$

From this can be seen the similarity relationships
$$\frac{t_a}{t_b}=\frac{a}{c}, \qquad \frac{t_b}{t_c}=\frac{c}{b}, \qquad \frac{t_c}{t_a}=\frac{b}{a} \qquad \text{and hence} \qquad t_a  :  t_b  :  t_c \quad = \quad a  :  c :  b.$$

There is a primitive integer-sided automedian triangle that is not generated from a right triangle: namely, the equilateral triangle with sides of unit length.

== Examples ==
There are 18 primitive integer automedian triangles, shown here as triples of sides $(a,b,c)$, with $b\le 200$:

(1, 1, 1)	(13, 17, 7)	(17, 23, 7)	(25, 31, 17)	(37, 47, 23)	(41, 49, 31)
(61, 71, 49)	(65, 79, 47)	(85, 97, 71)	(85, 113, 41)	(89, 119, 41)	(101, 119, 79)
(113, 127, 97)	(125, 161, 73)	(145, 161, 127)	(145, 167, 119)	(149, 191, 89)	(181, 199, 161)

For example, (26, 34, 14) is not a primitive automedian triple, as it is a multiple of (13, 17, 7) and does not appear above.

== Additional properties ==
If $\Delta (a,b,c)$ is the area of the automedian triangle, by Heron's formula $\Delta (t_a,t_b,t_c) =(3/4)\Delta (a,b,c).$

The Euler line of an automedian triangle is perpendicular to the median to side $a$.

If the medians of an automedian triangle are extended to the circumcircle of the triangle, then the three points $LMN$ where the extended medians meet the circumcircle form an isosceles triangle. The triangles for which this second triangle $LMN$ is isosceles are exactly the triangles that are themselves either isosceles or automedian. This property of automedian triangles stands in contrast to the Steiner–Lehmus theorem, according to which the only triangles two of whose angle bisectors have equal length are the isosceles triangles.

Additionally, suppose that $ABC$ is an automedian triangle, in which vertex $A$ stands opposite the side $a$. Let $G$ be the point where the three medians of $ABC$ intersect, and let $AL$ be one of the extended medians of $ABC$, with $L$ lying on the circumcircle of $ABC$. Then $BGCL$ is a parallelogram, the two triangles $BGL$ and $CLG$ into which it may be subdivided are both similar to $ABC$, $G$ is the midpoint of $AL$, and the Euler line of the triangle is the perpendicular bisector of $AL$.

When generating a primitive automedian triangle from a primitive Pythagorean triple using the Euclidean parameters $m,n$, then $m>n$ and it follows that $b \ge a \ge c$. As non-primitive automedian triangles are multiples of their primitives the inequalities of the sides apply to all integer automedian triangles. Equality occurs only for trivial equilateral triangles. Furthermore, because $m+n$ is always odd, all the sides $a,b,c$ have to be odd. This fact allows automedian triples to have sides and perimeter of prime numbers only. For example, (13, 17, 7) has perimeter 37.

Because in a primitive automedian triangle side $a$ is the sum of two squares and equal to the hypotenuse of the generating primitive Pythagorean triple, it is divisible only by primes congruent to 1 (mod 4). Consequently, $a$ must be congruent to 1 (mod 4).

Similarly, because the sides are related by $2a^2=b^2+c^2$, each of the sides $b$ and $c$ in the primitive automedian is the difference between twice a square and a square. They are also the sum and difference of the legs of a primitive Pythagorean triple. This constrains $b$ and $c$ to be divisible only by primes congruent to ±1 (mod 8). Consequently, $b$ and $c$ must be congruent to ±1 (mod 8).

== History ==
The study of integer squares in arithmetic progression has a long history stretching back to Diophantus and Fibonacci; it is closely connected with congrua, which are the numbers that can be the differences of the squares in such a progression. However, the connection between this problem and automedian triangles is much more recent. The problem of characterizing automedian triangles was posed in the late 19th century in the Educational Times (in French) by Joseph Jean Baptiste Neuberg, and solved there with the formula $2a^2=b^2+c^2$ by William John Greenstreet.

== Special cases ==
Apart from the trivial cases of equilateral triangles, the triangle with side lengths 17, 13, and 7 is the smallest (by area or perimeter) automedian triangle with integer side lengths.

There is only one automedian right triangle, the triangle with side lengths proportional to 1, the square root of 2, and the square root of 3. This triangle is the second triangle in the spiral of Theodorus. It is the only right triangle in which two of the medians are perpendicular to each other.

== See also ==
- Integer triangle
- Kepler triangle, a right triangle in which the squared edge lengths form a geometric progression instead of an arithmetic progression
- median triangle
