= William Hillhouse =

William Hillhouse FLS
- Born: 17 December 1850; Bedford, Bedfordshire
- Died: 27 January 1910 (aged 59); Malvern, Worcestershire
- Education: Bedford Modern School
- Alma mater: Trinity College, Cambridge
- Known for: Botany
- Scientific career
- Institutions: University of Birmingham

William Hillhouse FLS (17 December 1850 – 27 January 1910) was the first Professor of Botany at the University of Birmingham (1882–1909). He was one of the first professors appointed to the Mason Science College in Birmingham in 1882 and, prior to that appointment, was University Lecturer in Botany at the University of Cambridge and Lecturer in Botany at Newnham College, Cambridge and Girton College, Cambridge. During the first year of his tenure at Mason, Hillhouse spent time in Bonn in the laboratory of Professor Strasburger who was then one of the most famous botanists of the time. In 1887 he collaborated with Professor Strasburger on a translation of Strasburger's Practical Botany.

Hillhouse was active in advancing education in the Midlands. He was President of the Birmingham Natural History Society and the King's Heath, Bearwood and Moseley Institutes. He was Chairman of the Birmingham Botanical and Horticultural Society and assisted in making the Birmingham Botanical Gardens.

== Early life ==
Hillhouse was the son of John Paton Hillhouse and was born in Bedford on 17 December 1850. He was educated at Bedford Modern School, He became an Assistant Master at his old school where he started to take up botany in conjunction with Edward Mann Langley and Joseph Reynolds Green, both at that time resident in Bedford, under the informal tuition of Samuel Hoppus Adams. He assisted in the creation of the Bedfordshire Natural History Society and was ‘instrumental in bringing together material of a new Floral History of Bedfordshire, although the material was never published. In 1876, Hillhouse was made a Fellow of the Linnean Society of London.

== Academic life ==
In 1877 Hillhouse decided to devote his energies to the study of botany and went up to Trinity College, Cambridge. Hillhouse became a member of the Cambridge Philosophical Society, was made the University's Lecturer in Botany and was also appointed Lecturer in Botany at Newnham College, Cambridge and Girton College, Cambridge. He also served as Assistant Curator of the Cambridge Herbarium (1878–82) and was co-founder and co-editor of the Cambridge Review (1879).

Hillhouse was one of the first professors appointed to the Mason Science College in Birmingham in 1882. During the first year of his tenure at Mason, Hillhouse spent some time in Bonn in the laboratory of Professor Strasburger who was then one of the most famous botanists of the time. In 1887 he collaborated with Professor Strasburger on a translation of Strasburger's Practical Botany.

In 1888, Hillhouse was appointed Chairman of the Academic Board of Mason Science College. It was ‘largely by his efforts a University Extension Movement was established in connection with Birmingham’ and Hillhouse held the first Chair of Botany at what was to become the University of Birmingham.

== Educational work ==
Hillhouse was active in advancing education in the Midlands. He was President of the Birmingham Natural History Society and the King's Heath, Bearwood and Moseley Institutes. He was Chairman of the Birmingham Botanical and Horticultural Society and assisted in making the Botanical Gardens, in Edgbaston, ‘one of the most delightful places in the Birmingham district, and the alpine garden, which he designed and assisted to construct, [as] one of the boldest pieces of rock work in any provincial garden’. In that endeavour he was assisted by Neville Chamberlain with whom he kept a regular correspondence.

== Final years ==
Hillhouse died in Malvern on 27 January 1910, a place to which he had moved as his health had for some years been precarious. His obituary in the Journal of Botany described his 'unfailing kindness and enthusiasm'.
