= John Russell (VC) =

Welsh Victoria Cross recipient

John Fox Russell
- Born: 27 January 1893; Holyhead, Anglesey, Wales
- Died: 6 November 1917 (aged 24); Tel-el-Khuwwilfeh, Palestine
- Burial place: Beersheba War Cemetery
- Military career
- Allegiance: United Kingdom
- Branch: British Army
- Service years: 1909–1917
- Rank: Captain
- Units: Royal Welch Fusiliers; Royal Army Medical Corps
- Conflicts: First World War
- Awards: Victoria Cross; Military Cross

Captain John Fox Russell, VC, MC (27 January 1893 – 6 November 1917) was a Welsh physician, a British Army officer and a recipient of the Victoria Cross, the highest award for gallantry in the face of the enemy that can be awarded to British and Commonwealth forces.

== Early life and education ==
Russell was born in Holyhead, Anglesey, on 27 January 1893 to William Fox Russell and Ethel Maria Fox Russell. At an early age, he passed the examination for a choristership at Magdalen College School, Oxford, where he was educated for three years before attending St. Bees School in Cumbria. While at School he was an enthusiastic member of the Officer Training Corps. He was also a member of the 1st Holyhead Scout Troop, Wolf Patrol.

== Military career ==
Russell joined the Middlesex Hospital when only sixteen years of age and it was while he was in London that he joined the University of London Officers Training Corps, obtaining a commission in the Royal Welch Fusiliers in 1914. He was with them in camp when war was declared. Being anxious to qualify, he was seconded in order to complete his medical studies. After obtaining his diplomas, he joined the Royal Army Medical Corps and was attached to a battery of the Royal Field Artillery. He later re-joined his old regiment R.W.F 1st/6th Battalion (Anglesey and Caernarvonshire) and went out to Egypt as medical officer.

In the First Battle of Gaza, Russell won the Military Cross. He was subsequently awarded the Victoria Cross at Tel-el-Khuwwilfeh, Palestine. The citation for the award read:

For most conspicuous bravery displayed in action until he was killed. Captain Russell repeatedly went out to attend the wounded under murderous fire from snipers and machine-guns, and in many cases, when no other means were at hand, carried them in himself, although almost exhausted. He showed the greatest possible degree of valour.

— The London Gazette, (No. 30491) 8 January 1918

Russell was killed in action on 6 November 1917 and is buried at the Beersheba War Cemetery. A memorial to him and two other VC recipients, Captain Leefe Robinson of the Royal Flying Corps and Captain Richard Wain of the Tank Corps, was erected at St Bees School.

Russell's Victoria Cross is on display at the Army Medical Services Museum, in the Defence Medical Services Training Centre, Keogh Barracks, Mytchett Place Road, Mytchett, in Surrey.

In 2022 the newly built Headquarters of both Clwyd and Gwynedd ACF and a detachment of 203 Field Hospital at Kinmel Camp in Bodelwyddan was named Ty John Fox-Russell VC MC in his honour.

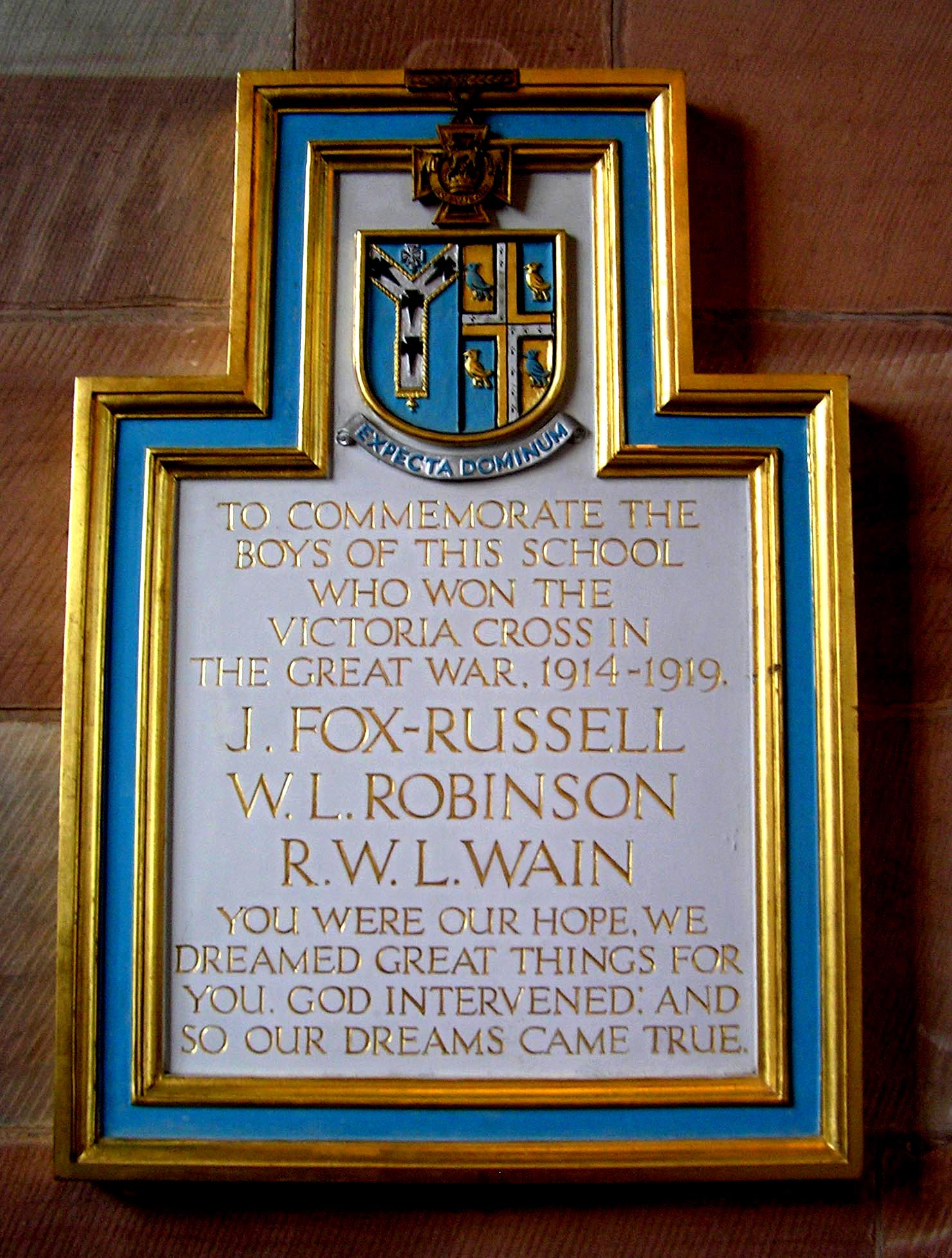
The VC memorial in St Bees School chapel.
