= Bedford Modern School =

Public school in Bedfordshire, England

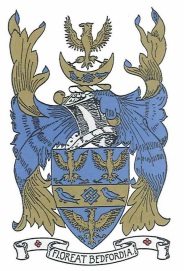

Location
- Manton Lane; Bedford, Bedfordshire, MK41 7NT; England; 52.148°N 0.482°W

Information
- Former names: The Writing School; The English School; The Commercial School
- Type: Public school Private day school
- Motto: Floreat Bedfordia (May Bedford flourish)
- Religious affiliation: Interdenominational
- Established: 1764; 262 years ago
- Department for Education URN: 109728 Tables
- Ofsted: Reports
- Chair: Sally Peck
- Headmaster: David Payne
- Gender: Coeducational
- Age: 7 to 18
- Enrolment: 1207
- Colours: Black and red
- Publication: The Eagle/ The Sports Eagle/ The Eaglet/ Eagle News (OBM)
- Alumni: Old Bedford Modernians
- School song: "School of the Black and Red"
- Boat club: Bedford Modern School Boat Club
- Former pupils: Old Bedford Modernians www.bedmod.co.uk/obms/
- Unofficial Motto: "Modern 'til I Die"
- Website: www.bedmod.co.uk

Listed Building – Grade II*
- Official name: Harpur Centre
- Designated: 6 June 1952
- Reference no.: 1138232

Bedford Modern School (commonly known as Bedford Modern or BMS) is a co-educational public school (a fee-paying day school) and member of the Headmasters' and Headmistresses' Conference in Bedford, England. Founded in 1764 following its separation from Bedford School, it forms part of The Harpur Trust, an educational charity established from the endowments left by Sir William Harpur in the 16th century. BMS comprises a junior school (ages 6–11) and a senior school (ages 11–18), with approximately 1,200 pupils.

== History ==
The school's origins lie in The Harpur Trust, founded on endowments left by Sir William Harpur, a Bedford-born Lord Mayor of London, in the 16th century. In 1764, following separation from Bedford School, the institution began operating under its own name. It subsequently traded under several names: the Writing School, the English School, the Commercial School and finally Bedford Modern School, the last change being made in 1873 to reflect a curriculum oriented towards the professions rather than the church.

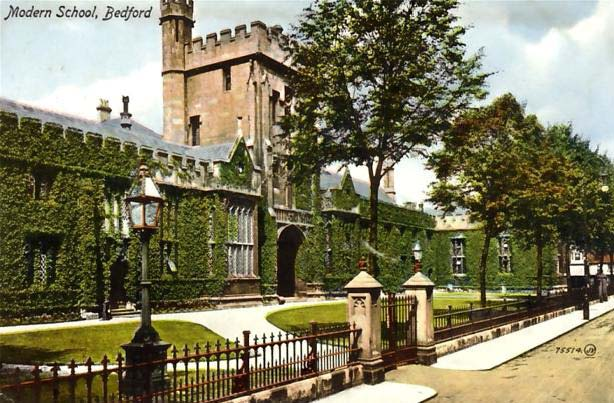
Bedford Modern School: Blore Building

The school established a reputation for academic ambition, attracting pupils not only from Bedfordshire but also military and colonial families seeking high-quality education for their children.

In 1834, the school relocated from its original premises in St Paul's Square to new buildings in Harpur Square designed by architect Edward Blore. These buildings were designated Grade II* listed in 1952.

During World War II, Dame Alice Owen's School was evacuated to BMS for the duration of the conflict. The school's swimming baths were also used during this time by inventors Cecil Vandepeer Clarke and Stuart Macrae to test prototype limpet mines. Clarke was an excellent swimmer and was able to propel himself through the water with a prototype bomb attached to a keeper plate on webbing around his waist.

The school's Prichard Museum, a collection of artifacts sent back to the school mainly from old boys around the world, became Bedford Museum, now The Higgins Art Gallery & Museum. George Witt was a major benefactor to the school's museum.

Growing enrolment eventually made the Harpur Square premises too cramped, and in 1974 the school moved to its current site on Manton Lane. The foundation stone was laid by Margaret Thatcher, and on 11 May 1976, Queen Elizabeth II visited with Prince Philip to unveil a commemorative panel at the new building.

Originally a boys' day and boarding school, Bedford Modern became fully co-educational in 2003 following the closure of its boarding houses. In 2013 BMS celebrated 10 years of co-education, with a play written by Mark Burgess commissioned to celebrate the event.

In 2014, the school celebrated the 250th anniversary of its separation from Bedford School.

In September 2023, Bedford Modern School was among the schools across the United Kingdom found to contain reinforced autoclaved aerated concrete (RAAC), a lightweight building material widely used in construction between the 1950s and 1990s that has since been found to be prone to sudden structural failure. The school's main block, built as part of the 1974 development, was identified as containing the material.

In November 2025, the school submitted a planning application to Bedford Borough Council to demolish a section of its main block affected by the RAAC. The proposals included replacing it with new façades to the exposed elevations, a new tennis court in the resulting courtyard, a new glazed northern entrance, and a glazed canopy along the northern elevation.

== School houses ==
Following a tradition of over a hundred years the Senior School Houses of BMS were: North, South, East, West, County and United Boarders. United Boarders comprised the combined boarding houses: Culver, Shakespeare, and School House. The day boy houses often, though not always, reflected the parts of the town or county from which the boys hailed and were mentioned in the chorus of the school song.

House name and Colour
Bell
Farrar
Mobbs
Oatley
Rose
Tilden

Today, the senior school operates six houses, introduced in their current form in September 1998. Each house is named after an Old Bedford Modernian of national or international distinction, chosen through a school-wide competition. The houses are Bell, Farrar, Mobbs, Oatley, Rose and Tilden.

The junior school operates four different houses, each named after a former headmaster. Kaye (green, named after Cecil William Kaye, 1901–1916), Liddle (blue, named after Henry Weddell Liddle, 1922–1946), Poole (red, named after Robert Burton Poole, 1877–1900) and Taylor (yellow, named after John Edward Taylor, 1946–1965).

Each house has its own tie which consists of stripes of the three school colours and their own house colour. Inter-house sports competitions cover many sports run by the school, at both junior and senior level, such as rugby, football, cricket, netball and hockey. There are also non-sporting events such as quizzes and Music and Drama competitions. Students take leadership roles as house captains or house deputies.

== Monitors ==
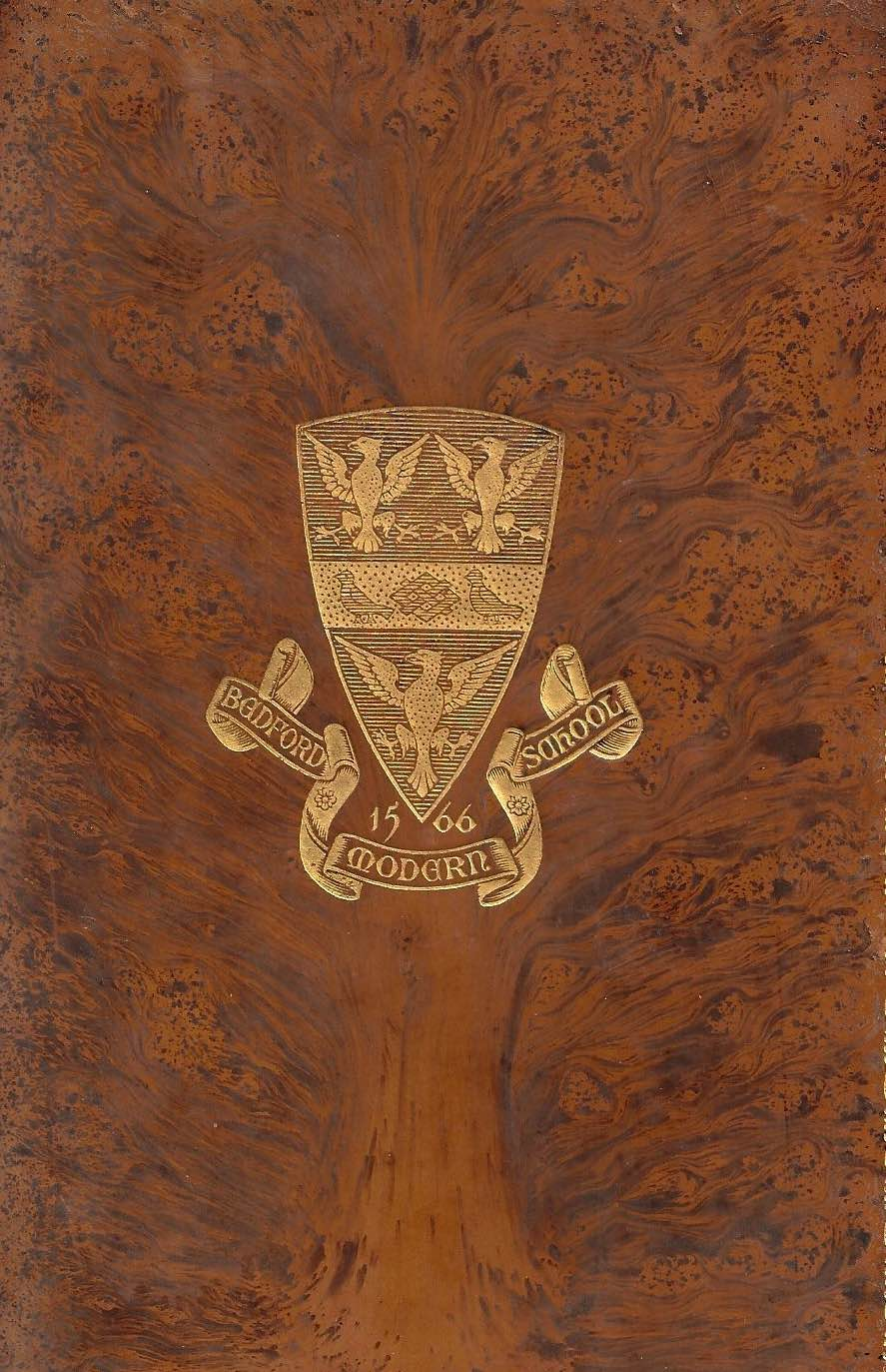
Bedford Modern School: Prize Book, Midsummer 1889

Monitors are selected, following a written application process, from students in the upper sixth. Each team of monitors works with a specific year group, and are led by two senior monitors, appointed by the headmaster. Senior monitors, along with the heads of school, are entitled to wear a red trim on their blazer.

== Extracurricular activities ==
=== Sport ===
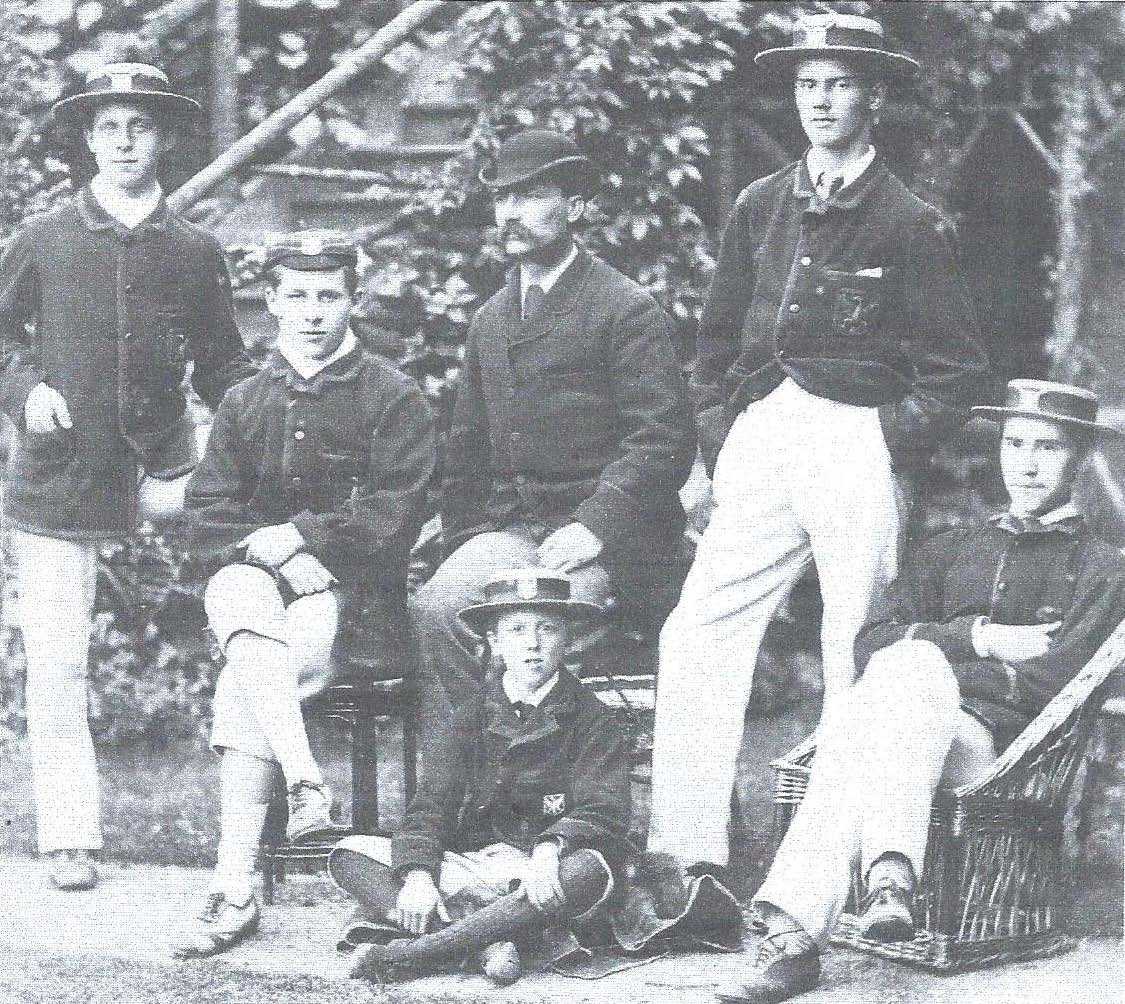
Bedford Modern School, first sortie to Henley in 1882

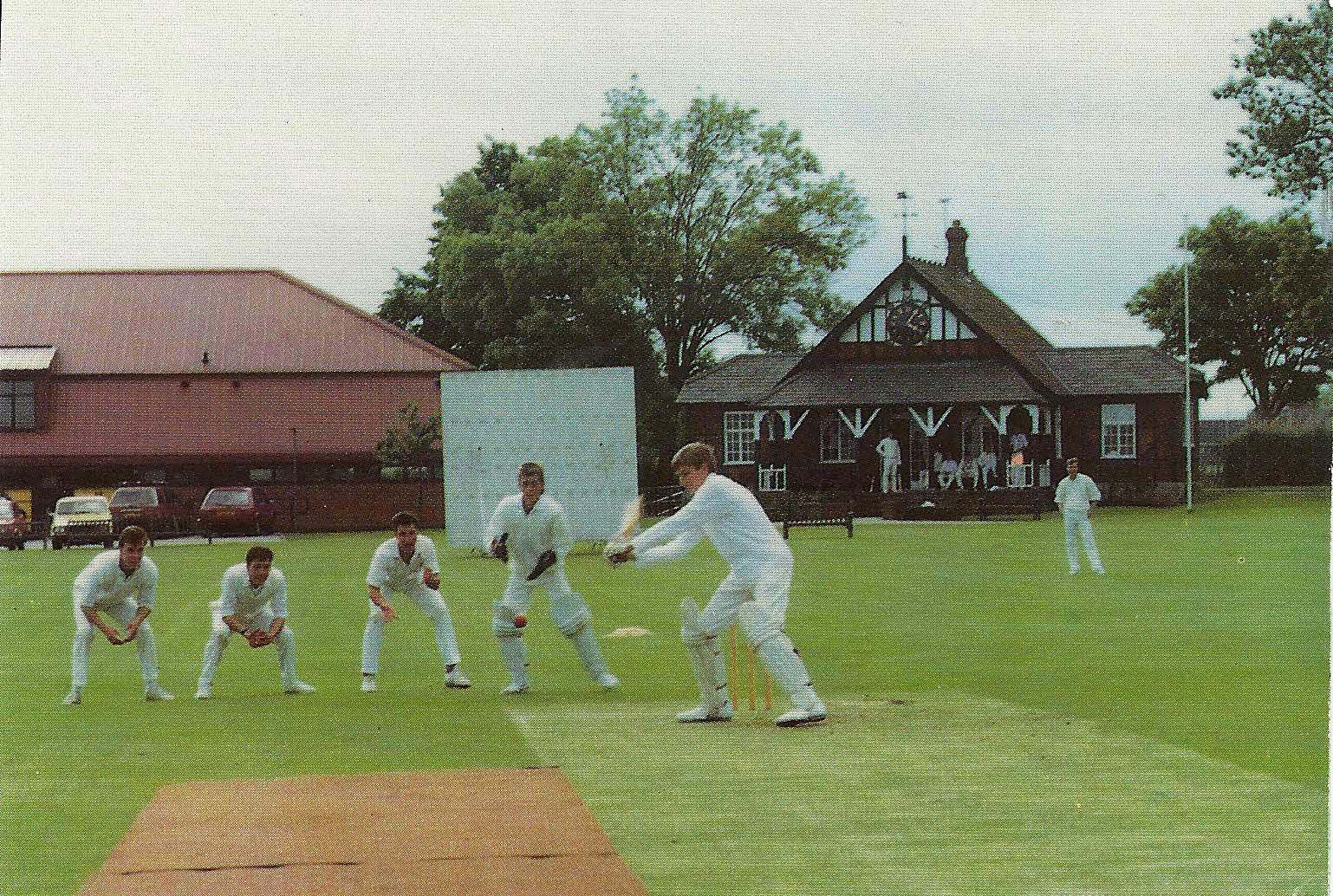
Bedford Modern School Cricket Pavilion

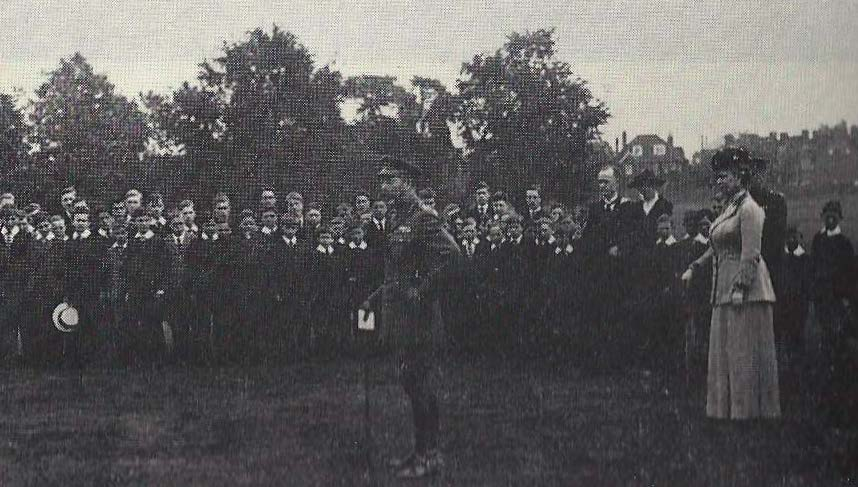
King George V addressing the Bedford Modern School CCF, 1918

Sport has long played a prominent role at Bedford Modern School. The school competes regularly against other leading independent schools including Bedford School, Berkhamsted School, Bishop's Stortford College, Eton College, Hampton School, Harrow School, Kimbolton School, Haileybury, Merchant Taylors, Oakham School, Oundle School, St Albans School, Stowe School and Stamford School in rugby union or rowing. Other sports include cricket, hockey, athletics, Rugby fives, football, swimming, table tennis, tennis and water polo.

The school maintains extensive sporting facilities, including a rowing boathouse on the River Great Ouse, rugby and cricket pitches, tennis and netball courts, a swimming pool, athletics track, climbing wall and strength and conditioning gym. The shooting range was closed and demolished to make space for the new science block in 2014.

The school was selected as an official training site for the 2012 Summer Olympics and Paralympics.

Bedford Modern has had former students going on to compete at national and international levels including two former captains of the England national rugby union team and a former captain of the England cricket team.

- Olympians: Charles Foulkes (field hockey bronze), John Yallop (rowing silver), Tim Foster (rowing gold), Thomas Hammond (track and field), Sir Sidney Abrahams (long jump), Hamilton Milton (swimming), Peter Knapp (rowing), Neil Keron (rowing), Rod Chisholm (rowing)
- Paralympian: Julie Rogers
- England rugby caps: Horace Finlinson, WB Thomson, Edgar Mobbs (captain), Arthur Gilbert Bull, Dick Stafford, Harold Day, Dickie Jeeps (captain) and Lionel Edward Weston
- England cricketers: Arthur Jones (captain), Geoff Millman, Monty Panesar. A.O. Jones invented the cricket position of gully
- Football: James Oswald Anderson played football for Argentina in its first ever official national game against Uruguay in 1902
- Boat Race oarsmen: Sir Archibald Dennis Flower, William Poole, Sir George Godber, David Leadley, Joseph Dominic Kinsella, JD Hughes, Tim Foster, David Gillard, Kenelm Richardson (Cambridge cox)
- Rugby fives British champion: Matt Cavanagh (2004 and 2006)

=== Performing arts ===
The school puts on two major productions annually, normally musicals, with full orchestra and set, in its 300-seat auditorium. It also hosts its own Shakespeare Festival, in which local schools are invited to take part. The sixth form has its own theatre company, Theatre in Transit, which puts on a piece of theatre each year at professional venues. In September 2014, the Chamber Choir performed The Armed Man at the Royal Albert Hall as part of Sing UK's 'A Mass for Peace'.

Combined Cadet Force

The BMS Combined Cadet Force was established in 1900 and comprises the Royal Navy, the Army and the Royal Air Force. The Royal Marines section was closed in 2018. King George V addressed the Bedford Modern School CCF in 1918.

== Eagle magazine ==
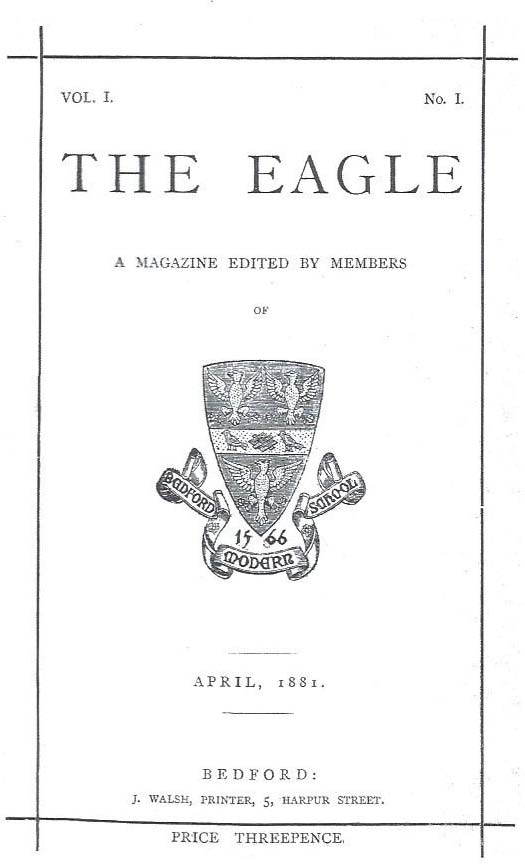
The Eagle, The Magazine of Bedford Modern School, first published in 1881

The school has several of its own publications, the most prominent of which is named The Eagle, first published in 1881.

Published mostly biannually, it serves both as a school magazine and a record of life at BMS during each academic year. The Eagle is predominantly designed and edited by sixth form students, and since 2000 is printed as a glossy magazine with around 48 pages. It often also includes feature articles and interviews with former students.

In addition to The Eagle, other publications include The Eaglet, which, until recently, was included as part of the main magazine, and includes articles from the Junior School.

Another publication is the Eagle News, which is published for the benefit of OBMs. It includes School news, and follow-up articles of former pupils. In 1906 the mathematician Eric Temple Bell reported news of an earthquake in San Francisco, where he was resident at the time.

== List of headmasters ==
The following have been Headmasters of Bedford Modern School.

- 1764–1765 John Whitehouse
- 1765–1799 George Jackson
- 1799–1809 John Whitehouse
- 1809–1814 James Ruffhead
- 1814–1820 William Massey
- 1821–1831 William Henry White
- 1831–1860 John Moore
- 1860–1877 Wilkinson Finlinson
- 1877–1900 Robert Burton Poole
- 1901–1916 Cecil William Kaye
- 1917–1922 Arnold Powell
- 1922–1946 Henry Weddell Liddle
- 1946–1965 John Edward Taylor
- 1965–1977 Brian Kemball-Cook
- 1977–1996 Peter John Squire
- 1996–2009 Stephen Smith
- 2010–2017 Michael Hall
- 2017–2023 Alex Tate
- 2023–present David Payne

== Notable staff ==
- Thomas Blyth (1844–1913), later author and commissary to the Archbishop of Ottawa and Bishops of Niagara
- William Hillhouse (1850–1910), first professor of botany at the University of Birmingham
- Edward Mann Langley (1851–1933), founder of the Mathematical Gazette and creator of Langley’s Adventitious Angles
- Sir Percy Nunn (1870–1944), educationalist
- Ronald Welch (1909–1982), author
- Allan Towell (1925–1997), England Rugby International
- John Moore (born 1943), footballer, 1st team football coach
- David Davies (born 1957) author and historian, former history master
- Mark Burgess (born 1960), actor and playwright, Head of Speech and Drama
- Rob Hardwick (born 1969), England Rugby International
- Chris Willmott (born 1977), football coach and retired English footballer
- Rochelle Clark (born 1981), member of the England women's national rugby union team

== Old Bedford Modernians ==
Former pupils of the school are known as Old Bedford Modernians or OBMs.

== See also ==
- Grade II* listed buildings in Bedfordshire
