= Median triangle =

Mathematical concept

Reference triangle: △ABC Median triangle: △BGF Median triangle of △BGF: △BKH Similarity: △BGF ~ △BKH

In geometry, the median triangle of a given (reference) triangle is a triangle, the sides of which are equal and parallel to the medians of its reference triangle. The area of the median triangle is 3/4 of the area of its reference triangle:

$$| \triangle BGF| = \frac{3}{4} |\triangle ABC|$$

The median triangle of the median triangle is similar to the reference triangle of the first median triangle with a scaling factor of 3/4:

$$\frac{|BH|}{|BC|} = \frac{|HK|}{|AB|} = \frac{|BK|}{|AC|} = \frac{3}{4}$$

== See also ==
- Automedian triangle
