= Cecil William Kaye =

British headmaster (1865–1941)

- Born: June 25, 1865
- Died: May 15, 1941 (aged 75)
- Occupation: educationalist

Cecil William Kaye (25 June 1865 – 15 May 1941) was a British educationalist. He was headmaster of three schools; Loughborough Grammar School, 1893–1900; Bedford Modern School, 1901–1916 (and Principal of Bedford Evening Institution 1901–1916); and St Bees School, 1916–1926.

Kaye was educated at Marlborough College; University College, Oxford and the University of Würzburg.

Kaye married Dora Millicent, daughter of late Judge William Barber, QC.
