= List of headmasters of St. Bees School =

School House, the residence of headmasters since 1886.

The list of headmasters of St. Bees School includes the men and one woman who have held the headmastership of St. Bees School in west Cumbria (formerly the county of Cumberland). Under the statutes drawn up by the school's founder, Archbishop Edmund Grindal, the headmaster of the school was chosen by the Provost of the Queen's College, Oxford. This state of affairs lasted until 1879 when a "new scheme" came into place and the board of governors had a greater say in the appointment.

In the early days of the school the headmaster was the sole master, his school being a one-story stone building (now the school's main dining room). In the nineteenth century, St. Bees School began to expand thanks to the proceeds from mineral royalties, legally won in part by the efforts of Headmaster William Wilson, and in 1844 the headmaster moved into the newly built south wing of the "Quad", the quadrangle of sandstone buildings which makes up the main and oldest part of the school. In 1886, a purpose built home was constructed called the "School House", part of which today serves as a senior boys' boarding house.

== List of headmasters at St. Bees School ==
Rev. H. A. P. Sawyer (Headmaster 1903–1916).

List of headmasters at St. Bees School since 1583
Years	Name	Alma mater	References
1583–1593	Nicholas Copland, B.A.	-	
1593–1612	William Briscoe, M.A.	-	
1612–1630	William Lickbarrow, M.A.	-	
1630–1679	Francis Radcliffe, M.A.	The Queen's College, Oxford	
1679–1681	Bernard Gilpin, B.A.	The Queen's College, Oxford	
1681–1686	Jonathan Banks, B.A.	Pembroke College, Cambridge	
1686–1738	Rev. Richard Jackson, M.A.	The Queen's College, Oxford	
1738–1755	Rev. Alan Fisher, B.A.	The Queen's College, Oxford	
1755–1773	Rev. John James, M.A.	The Queen's College, Oxford	
1773–1788	Rev. Robert Scott, M.A.	The Queen's College, Oxford	
1788–1791	Rev. James Hutchinson, M.A.	The Queen's College, Oxford	
1791–1811	Rev. John Barnes, M.A.	The Queen's College, Oxford	
1811–1817	Rev. William Wilson, M.A.	The Queen's College, Oxford	
1817–1830	Rev. Thomas Bradley, M.A.	The Queen's College, Oxford	
1830–1841	Rev. John Fox, M.A.	The Queen's College, Oxford	
1841–1854	Rev. Miles Atkinson, M.A.	The Queen's College, Oxford	
1854–1879	Rev. George Henry Heslop, M.A.	The Queen's College, Oxford	
1879–1903	Rev. William Taylor Newbold, M.A.	St John's College, Cambridge	
1903–1916	Rev. Harold Athelstane Parry Sawyer, M.A.	The Queen's College, Oxford	
1917–1926	Cecil William Kaye, M.A.	University College, Oxford	
1926–1935	Edward Allen Bell, M.A.	Christ Church, Oxford	
1935 (acting)	Robert Branston Brown, M.A.	Trinity Hall, Cambridge	
1936–1938	Howard George Charles Mallaby, M.A.	Merton College, Oxford	
1938–1945	Rev. John Sidney Boulter, M.A.	Keble College, Oxford	
1945–1946	C.G.S. Harden, M.A.	St. John's College, Cambridge	
1946–1951	Henry Enfield Reekie	Clare College, Cambridge	
1951–1963	James Cochrane Wykes, M.A.	Clare College, Cambridge	
1963–1980	Geoffrey William Lees, M.A.	Downing College, Cambridge	
1980–1988	Malcolm Tod Thyne, M.A.	Clare College, Cambridge	
1988–1997	Paul Arthur Chamberlain, B.Sc.	University of Durham	
1997 (acting)	Philip James Etchells, B.Sc., Ph.D.	University of Liverpool	-
1998–2000	Janet Dolton Pickering, B.Sc.	University of Sheffield	
2000–2012	Philip J. Capes, M.A.	University of Exeter	
2012–2015	James Davies	University of Sheffield	
2017-2018	Jeremy Hallows	University of Sheffield	
2018-2021	Gareth Seddon	Université de Lyon II	
2021-2021	Roger Sinnett	University of Cambridge	
2021-2024	Robin Silk	University of Cambridge	
2024-Present	Andrew Keep	University of Exeter	

== Bibliography ==
- Special Committee, Old St. Beghians' Club (1939). The Story of St. Bees: 1583–1939. London: Buck & Wootton, Ltd.
