= Langley's Adventitious Angles =

Geometry puzzle

Langley's Adventitious Angles

Solution to Langley's 80-80-20 triangle problem

Langley's Adventitious Angles is a puzzle in which one must infer an angle in a geometric diagram from other given angles. It was posed by Edward Mann Langley in The Mathematical Gazette in 1922.

== The problem ==
In its original form the problem was as follows:

$ABC$ is an isosceles triangle with $\angle{CBA}=\angle{ACB}=80^\circ.$

$CF$ at $30^\circ$ to $AC$ cuts $AB$ in $F.$

$BE$ at $20^\circ$ to $AB$ cuts $AC$ in $E.$

Prove $\angle{BEF}=30^\circ.$

== Solution ==
The problem of calculating angle $\angle{BEF}$ is a standard application of Hansen's resection. Such calculations can establish that $\angle{BEF}$ is within any desired precision of 30°, but being of only finite precision, always leave doubt about the exact value.

A direct proof using classical geometry was developed by James Mercer in 1923. This proof involves drawing one additional line, and then making repeated use of the fact that the internal angles of a triangle add up to 180° to prove that several triangles drawn within the large triangle are all isosceles.

Draw $BG$ at $20^\circ$ to $BC$ intersecting $AC$ at $G$ and draw $FG.$ (See figure on the lower right.)

Since $\angle{BCG}=80^\circ$ and $\angle{CBG}=20^\circ$ then $\angle{BGC}=80^\circ$ and triangle $BCG$ is isosceles with $BC=BG.$

Since $\angle{BCF}=50^\circ$ and $\angle{CBF}=80^\circ$ then $\angle{BFC}=50^\circ$ and triangle $BCF$ is isosceles with $BC=BF.$

Since $\angle{FBG}=60^\circ$ and $BF=BG$ then triangle $BGF$ is equilateral.

Since $\angle{BGE}=100^\circ$ and $\angle{GBE}=40^\circ$ then $\angle{GEB}=40^\circ$ and triangle $BGE$ is isosceles with $GB=GE.$

Therefore all the red lines in the figure are equal.

Since $GE=GF$ triangle $EFG$ is isosceles with $\angle{GEF}=70^\circ.$

Therefore $\angle{BEF}=30^\circ.$

Many other proofs are possible. Cut-the-Knot lists twelve different proofs and several alternative problems with the same 80-80-20 triangle but different internal angles.

== Generalization ==
Adventitious quadrangles problem

A quadrilateral such as BCEF is called an adventitious quadrangle when the angles between its diagonals and sides are all rational angles, angles that give rational numbers when measured in degrees or other units for which the whole circle is a rational number. Numerous adventitious quadrangles beyond the one appearing in Langley's puzzle have been constructed. They form several infinite families and an additional set of sporadic examples.

Classifying the adventitious quadrangles (which need not be convex) turns out to be equivalent to classifying all triple intersections of diagonals in regular polygons. This was solved by Gerrit Bol in 1936. He in fact classified (though with a few errors) all multiple intersections of diagonals in regular polygons. His results (all done by hand) were confirmed with computer, and the errors corrected, by Bjorn Poonen and Michael Rubinstein in 1998. The article contains a history of the problem and a picture featuring the regular triacontagon and its diagonals.

In 2015, an anonymous Japanese woman using the pen name "aerile re" published the first known method (the method of 3 circumcenters) to construct a proof in elementary geometry for a special class of adventitious quadrangles problem. This work solves the first of the three unsolved problems listed by Rigby in his 1978 paper.
