= William John Greenstreet =

English mathematician

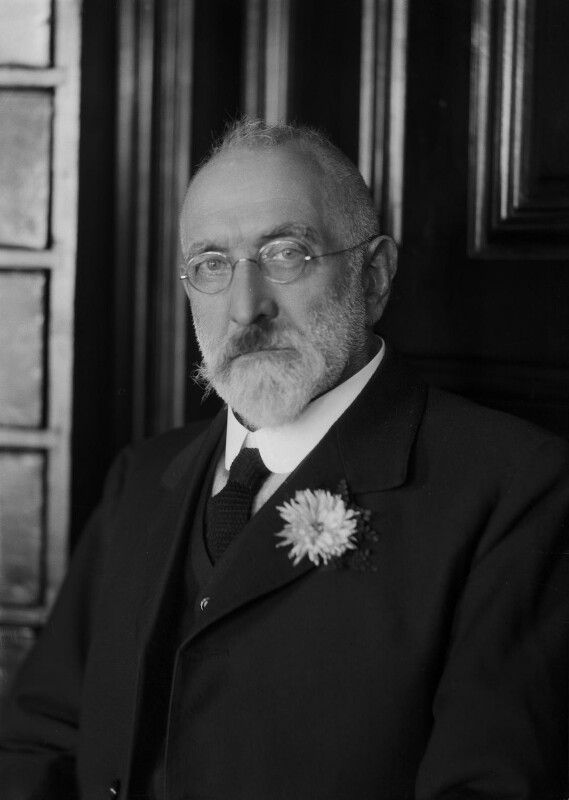
- Born: 18 August 1861; Shorncliffe Army Camp, Folkestone, Kent
- Died: 28 June 1930 (aged 68); Burghfield Common, West Berkshire
- Education: St John's College, Cambridge
- Spouse: Ethel de Medina Spender
- Parent(s): Thomas Greenstreet and Catherine S Greenstreet
- Scientific career
- Fields: Mathematics
- Workplaces: Marling School

William John Greenstreet (1861–1930) was an English mathematician who was editor of The Mathematical Gazette for more than thirty years.

== Life and work ==
Greenstreet was son of a Royal Artillery's Sergeant. He was educated at Southwark and he entered St John's College, Cambridge in 1879, graduating there in 1883. Then he was mathematics professor in different schools in Framlingham, East Riding and Cardiff before he became Head Master at Marling School in 1891. In 1910 he retired to Burghfield Common with the intention of devoting to literary work.

Greenstreet was founding member of the Mathematical Association and he started the Association's Library given a large collection of books.

== Bibliography ==
- Goodstein, R.L. (1974). "The Mathematical Association Library at the University of Leicester". The British Journal for the History of Science. 7 (1): 100–103. doi:10.1017/S0007087400013066. ISSN 0007-0874. S2CID 144469175.
- Macaulay, I.F.S.; Neville, E.H.; Pendlebury, C.; Spender, J.A.; Anderson, W.C.F. (1930). "Obituary: W. J. Greenstreet". The Mathematical Gazette. 15 (209): 181–186. doi:10.1017/S0025557200137258. ISSN 0025-5572. JSTOR 3605787. S2CID 185174470.
