= The Mathematical Gazette =

Academic journal covering mathematics education

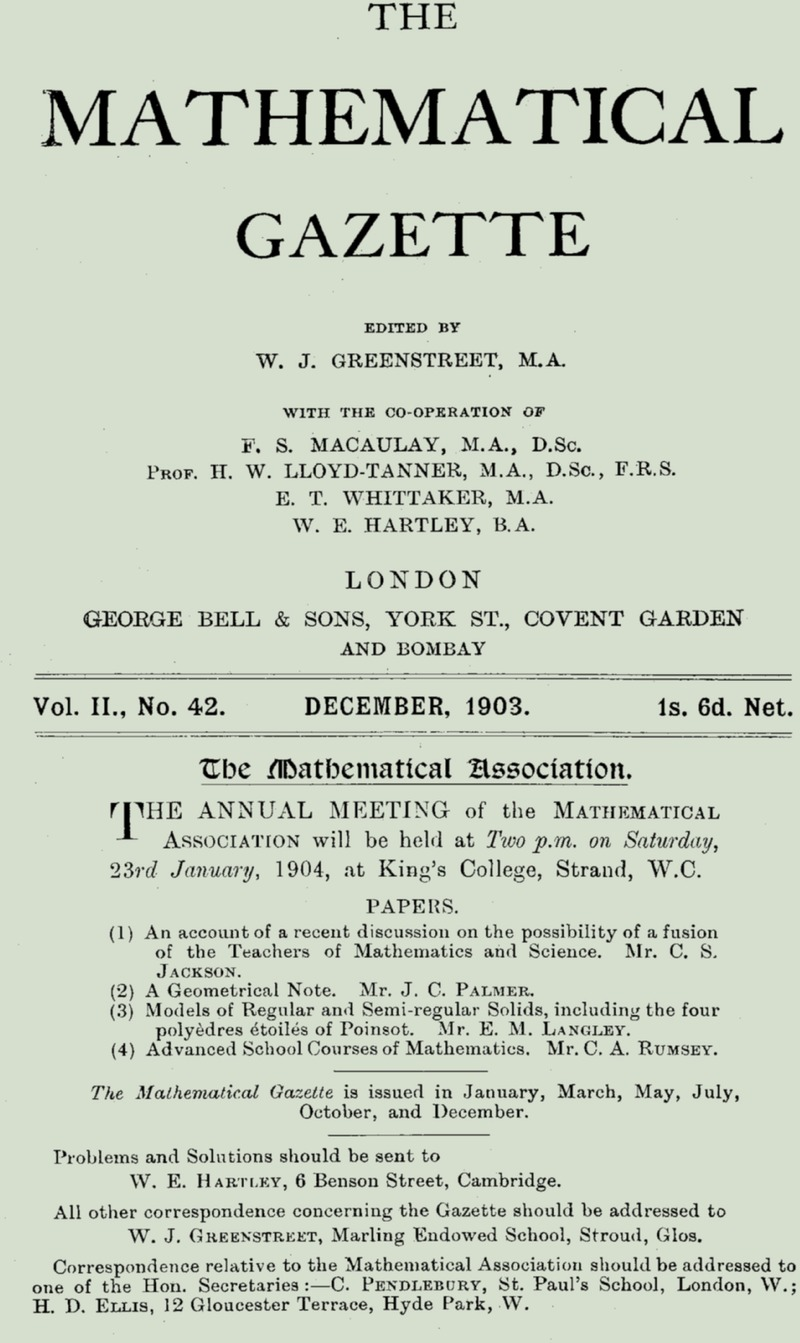
- Discipline: Mathematics education
- Language: English
- Edited by: Peter Rowlett

Publication details
- Former name: Reports of the Association for the Improvement of Geometrical Teaching
- History: 1894–present
- Publisher: Taylor & Francis on behalf of the Association for Mathematics in Education (United Kingdom)
- Frequency: Triannual
- Open access: Hybrid

Standard abbreviations
- ISO 4: Math. Gaz.

Indexing
- ISSN: 0025-5572 (print); 2056-6328 (web)
- LCCN: sf82006585
- JSTOR: 00255572
- OCLC no.: 819136059

Links
- Journal homepage; Online access; Online archive; Journal page at association website

The Mathematical Gazette is a triannual peer-reviewed academic journal published by Taylor & Francis on behalf of the Association for Mathematics in Education. It covers mathematics education with a focus on upper secondary school through to early-stage university study.

The journal was established in 1894 by Edward Mann Langley as the successor to the Reports of the Association for the Improvement of Geometrical Teaching. William John Greenstreet was its editor-in-chief for more than thirty years (1897–1930). Since July 2025, the editor is Peter Rowlett.

== Editors-in-chief ==
The following persons are or have been editor-in-chief:

- Edward Mann Langley: 1894–1895
- Francis Sowerby Macaulay: 1896–1898
- William John Greenstreet: 1899–1930
- Alan Broadbent: 1931–1955
- Reuben Goodstein: 1956–1962
- Edwin A. Maxwell: 1962–1971
- Douglas Quadling: 1972–1980
- Victor Bryant: 1980–1990
- Nick MacKinnon: 1990–1994
- Steve Abbott: 1994–2002
- Gerry Leversha: 2002–2025
- Peter Rowlett: 2026-Present

== Abstracting and indexing ==
The journal is abstracted and indexed in EBSCO databases, Emerging Sources Citation Index, Scopus, and zbMATH Open.
