= Richard William Leslie Wain =

Welsh recipient of the Victoria Cross (1896–1917)

- Born: 5 December 1896; Penarth, Glamorganshire, Wales
- Died: 20 November 1917 (aged 20); Marcoing, Nord, France
- Military career
- Allegiance: United Kingdom
- Branch: British Army
- Service years: 1915–1917
- Rank: Captain
- Units: Manchester Regiment; Tank Corps
- Conflicts: World War I: Western Front; Battle of the Somme; Battle of Albert; First day on the Somme; Capture of Montauban (WIA); Battle of Messines; Battle of Cambrai †
- Awards: Victoria Cross

Richard William Leslie Wain VC (5 December 1896 – 20 November 1917) was a Welsh recipient of the Victoria Cross, the highest and most prestigious award for gallantry in the face of the enemy that can be awarded to British and Commonwealth forces.

== Details ==
Wain was born in Penarth near Cardiff, Wales to Florence E. Wain and Harris Wain. He was educated at The Cathedral School, Llandaff and then at Penarth Grammar School and St Bees Grammar School, where he was a member of the Officers Training Corps. On the outbreak of the Great War, despite having won a scholarship to attend Oxford University, he joined the Territorial Army. He was commissioned into the Manchester Regiment on 16 July 1915 and served in France.

He was wounded on 1 July 1916 on the opening day of the battle of the Somme. He was serving as an officer of 17th Battalion of the Manchester Regiment; his unit suffering severe casualties as they successfully captured the village of Montauban. Wain served in A Company and was badly wounded as he led his men forward. He joined the Heavy Section of the Machine Gun Corps and was allocated to A Battalion. His unit, which was equipped with tanks, took part in the Battle of Messines in June 1917; Wain's tank reaching its final objective and destroying a number of German machine guns which were in a concrete emplacement.

He was 20 years old, and a section commander and acting captain in A Battalion, Tank Corps, when he was posthumously awarded a Victoria Cross for his actions on 20 November 1917 at Marcoing, near Cambrai, France, during the battle of Cambrai (1917). His tank took a direct hit killing all but him and one member of his crew. Though severely wounded he rushed an enemy strong point with a Lewis gun capturing it and taking about half the garrison prisoners. His actions allowed the infantry, which had been pinned back by the machine gun post, to advance. He was killed shortly afterwards while continuing to fire on the retiring enemy.

=== Citation ===
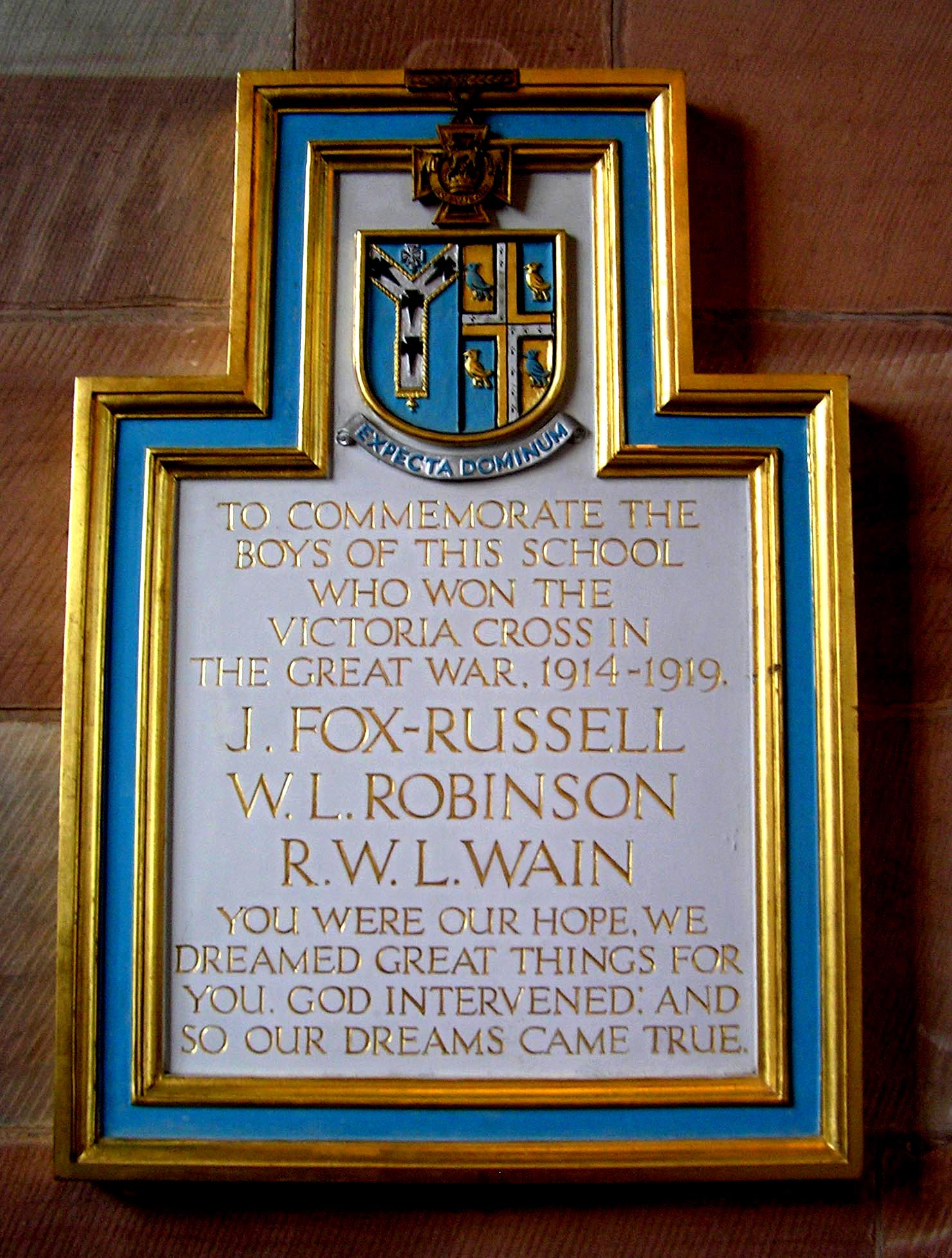
The VC memorial in St Bees School chapel.

For most conspicuous bravery in command of a section of Tanks. During an attack the Tank in which he was, was disabled by a direct hit near an enemy strong point which was holding up the attack. Capt. Wain and one man, both seriously wounded, were the only survivors. Though bleeding profusely from his wounds, he refused the attention of stretcher-bearers, rushed from behind the Tank with a Lewis gun, and captured the strong point, taking about half the garrison prisoners. Although his wounds were very serious he picked up a rifle and continued to fire at the retiring enemy until he received a fatal wound in the head. It was due to the valour displayed by Capt. Wain that the infantry were able to advance.

— The London Gazette, 13 February 1918

=== Memorials ===
Wain has no known grave. He is commemorated at the Cambrai Memorial to the Missing and on the war memorials at Llandaff Cathedral and in the chapel at St Bees School.

== Bibliography ==
- Gliddon, Gerald (2004) [2012]. VCs of the First World War: Cambrai 1917. The History Press. ISBN 978-0-75-247668-1.
