= Edward Mann Langley =

British mathematician (1851–1933)

- Edward Mann Langley
- Born: 22 January 1851; Buckden, Cambridgeshire
- Died: 9 June 1933 (aged 82); Bedford, Bedfordshire
- Education: Bedford Modern School
- Alma mater: University of London; Trinity College, Cambridge
- Known for: Founder of the Mathematical Gazette; Author of Mathematical Text Books; Langley’s Adventitious Angles

Edward Mann Langley (22 January 1851 – 9 June 1933) was a British mathematician, author of mathematical textbooks and founder of the Mathematical Gazette. He created the mathematical problem known as Langley’s Adventitious Angles.

== Biography ==
Langley was born in Buckden on 22 January 1851. He was educated at Bedford Modern School, the University of London and Trinity College, Cambridge where he was eleventh Wrangler (1878). After Cambridge, Langley taught mathematics at Bedford Modern School (1878-1918) where he wrote numerous mathematical text books and his pupils included the famous future mathematician Eric Temple Bell. Langley became Secretary of the Mathematical Association (1885-1893), founded the Mathematical Gazette (1894) and became its editor (1894–95).

In addition to mathematics, EM Langley was a notable botanist and a cultivated blackberry was named Edward Langley in his honour.

Langley died in Bedford on 9 June 1933. His former Bedford Modern School pupil, the mathematician Eric Temple Bell, contributed to his obituary in the Mathematical Gazette stating 'Every detail of his vigorous, magnetic personality is as vivid today as it was on the afternoon I first saw him'.

== Selected works ==
- The Harpur Euclid : an edition of Euclid's elements revised in accordance with the reports of the Cambridge Board of Mathematical Studies and the Oxford Board of the Faculty of Natural Science / by Edward M. Langley and W. Seys Phillips. Books I - IV. London; New York; Bombay : Longman's, Green, and Co., 1896.
- A treatise on computation. An account of the chief methods for contracting and abbreviating arithmetical calculations. Published London and New York, by Longmans Green & Co, 1910
