= St Bees School =

Public school in Cumbria, England

Location
- Wood Lane; St Bees, Cumbria, CA27 0DS; England
- Coordinates: 54.4944°N 3.5925°W

Information
- Type: Public school Private day and boarding
- Motto: Latin: Ingredere ut proficias (Enter so that you may make progress)
- Religious affiliation: Church of England
- Established: 1583; 443 years ago (reformed 2015–2018)
- Founder: Archbishop Edmund Grindal
- Department for Education URN: 145292 Tables
- Headmaster: Andrew Keep
- Years offered: 7 – 12
- Gender: Mixed
- Age: 11 to 18
- Enrollment: 116
- Houses: Bega; Foundation; Elizabeth; Grindal
- Publication: The Hive
- School fees: Up to £33,600 per year
- Alumni: Old St. Beghians
- Website: stbeesschool.co.uk

St Bees School is a co-educational fee-charging school, located in the West Cumbrian village of St Bees, England.

In 1583, it was founded by Edmund Grindal, the Archbishop of Canterbury, as a free grammar school for boys. The school remained small, with fewer than 40 pupils, until the expansions of the Victorian era. Paid for by mineral revenues and helped by the arrival of railway, by the First World War there were 300 pupils.

The 1930s saw a large decrease in numbers due to the Great Depression. However, numbers rose again during World War II, and this was followed by an era of further expansion.

In 1978, the school became co-educational.

On 13 March 2015, the school announced that due to falling pupil numbers, it would close in summer 2015.

In partnership with Full Circle Education Group, the school reopened on 6 September 2018. Numbers at the school have continued to increase, and as of 2024, there are over 100 students.

== Grounds and buildings ==
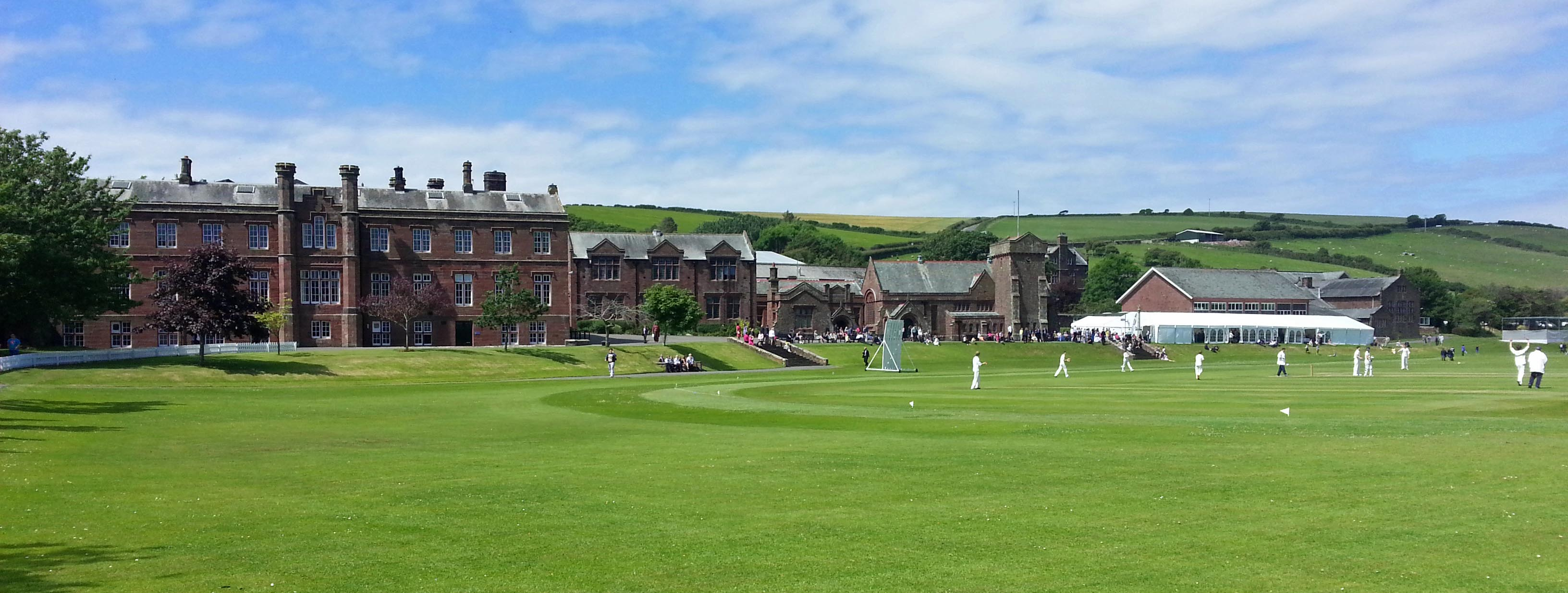
Panorama of cricket match on the "firsts" pitch on the main campus in 2014

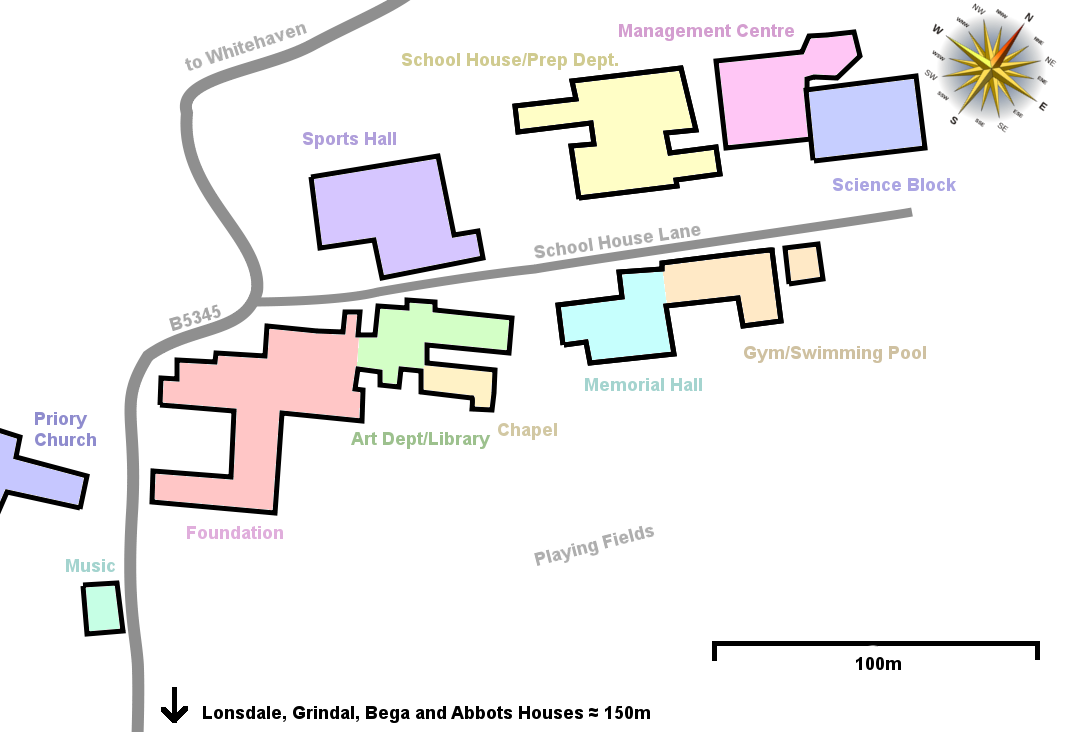
An overview map of the school

The school grounds occupy approximately 250 acres (100 ha), and the oldest buildings date from the late 16th century.

The buildings around the main quadrangle in the Foundation block are Grade II listed. This includes the original schoolroom on the lower northern side of the quadrangle.

The main campus is now concentrated around Wood Lane, adjacent to the Foundation block.

== History ==
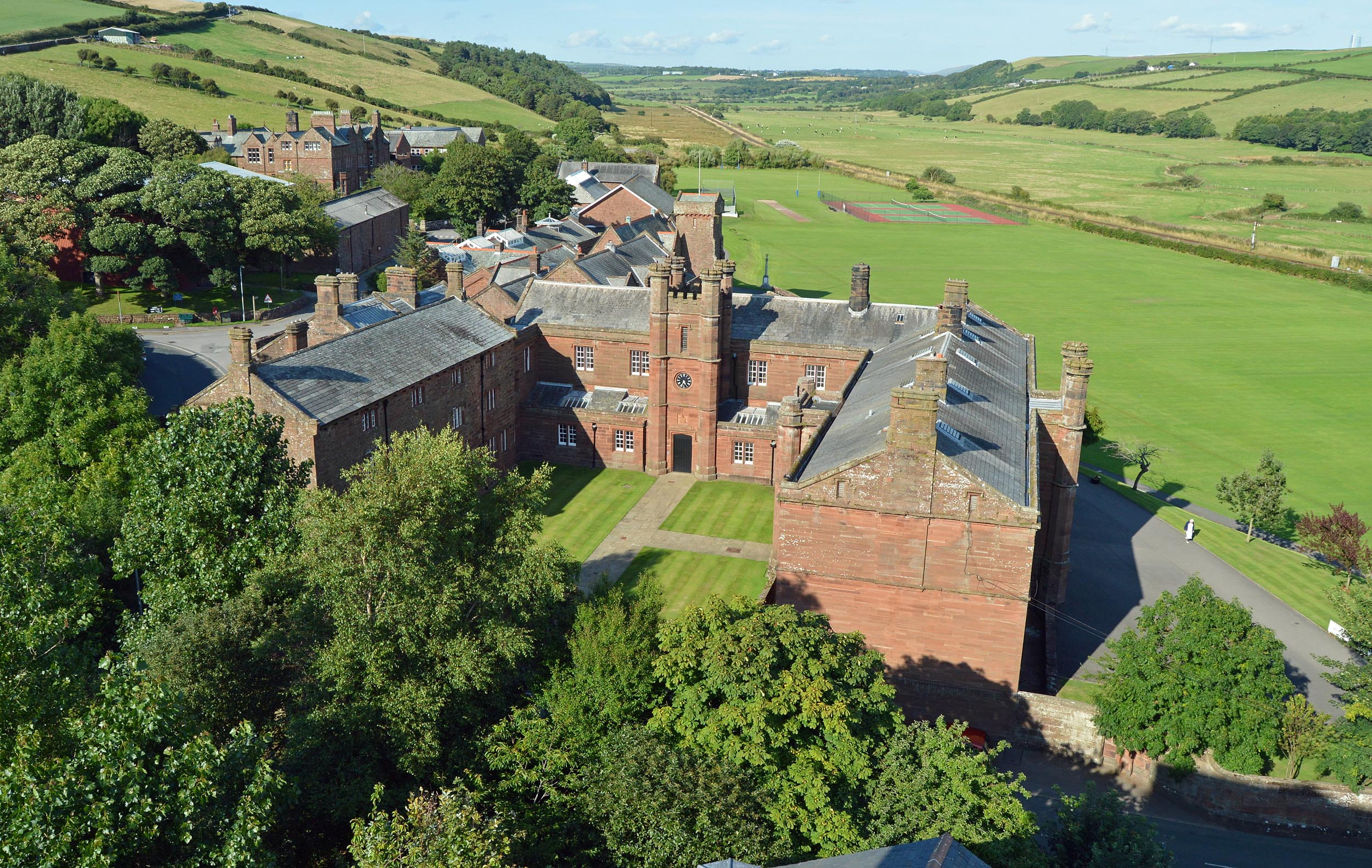
St Bees School, Cumbria, the Foundation block seen looking northeast from the tower of St Bees Priory. The original Elizabethan school is the range on the left of the quad.

The school was founded in 1583 by Edmund Grindal, Archbishop of Canterbury, who was born in St Bees, at Cross Hill House.

The oldest part of the school, known as Foundation was built in 1587, opposite the Priory Church.

Thanks to an agreement with Queen's College Oxford and the purchase of local tithes, the school prospered both financially and academically.

Although specifically incorporated for the education of boys from Cumberland and Westmorland, in 1604, pupils from outside those counties were also being educated at St Bees. However, the school only grew gradually.

The school enjoyed financial security for many years, but this was threatened from 1742 onwards when Sir James Lowther fraudulently obtained an 867-year lease of the extensive mineral rights for a minimal amount on which much of the prosperity of the Lowthers was built.

As a result of this fraud being exposed in 1812, the case eventually went to Court of Chancery. In 1842, compensation was paid by the Lowthers which was used to build the present open quadrangle, which includes the original schoolhouse.

Further expansion was facilitated by more equitable mineral revenues. The Royal Hotel was bought and converted into the Grindal house, while the construction of the School House and the headmaster's residence was done on Wood Lane.

By 1900, the school's chapel, additional classrooms, library, swimming baths, Gymnasium, science labs, and lecture theater had been built. By the beginning of the First World War, the school had reached three hundred pupils.

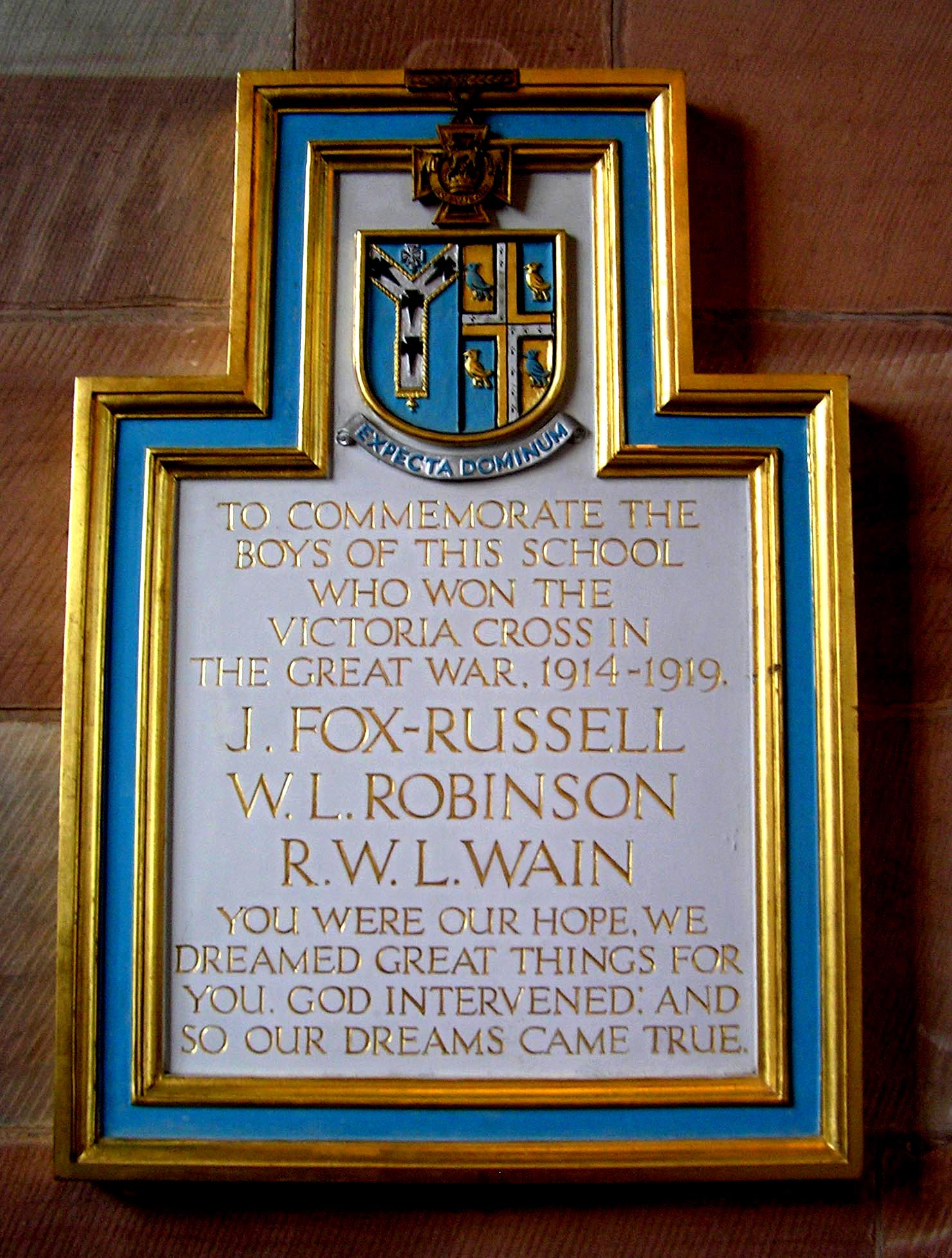
The VC memorial in the school chapel

During the First World War, old boys of the school were awarded the Victoria Cross. (See St. Bees V.C. winners for more details). Old boy Alfred Critchley became one of the youngest Brigadier-Generals, at the age of 27.

One hundred and eighty boys and staff died during the war, and a memorial was built overlooking the sports fields where so many had previously played.

After the war, in common with many other schools, the numbers decreased, especially in the 1930s. The situation became so critical that the governors attempted to have the school nationalized. In the end, the old boys put together a rescue package and the school remained independent.

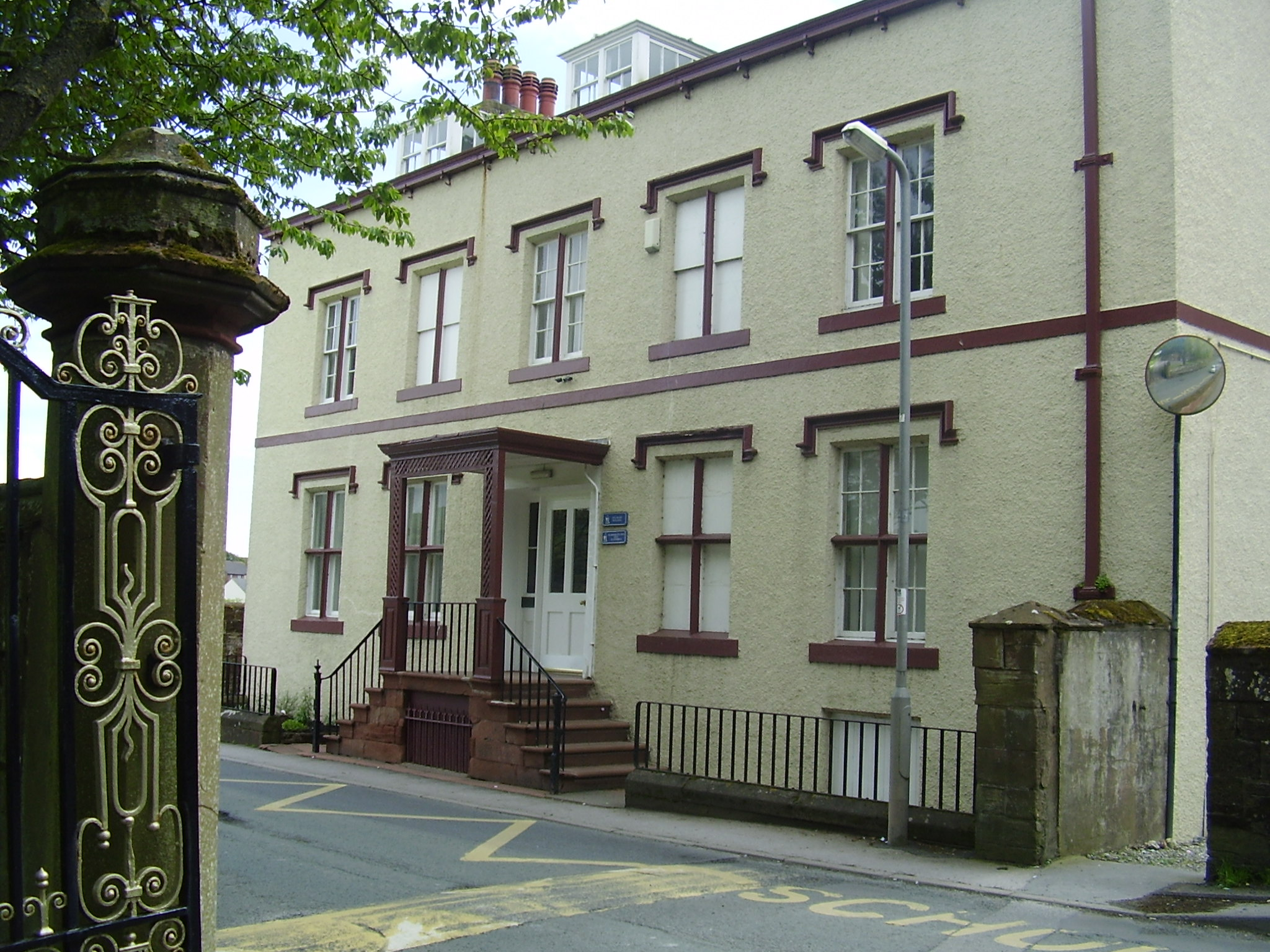
The refurbished Fox Music Centre

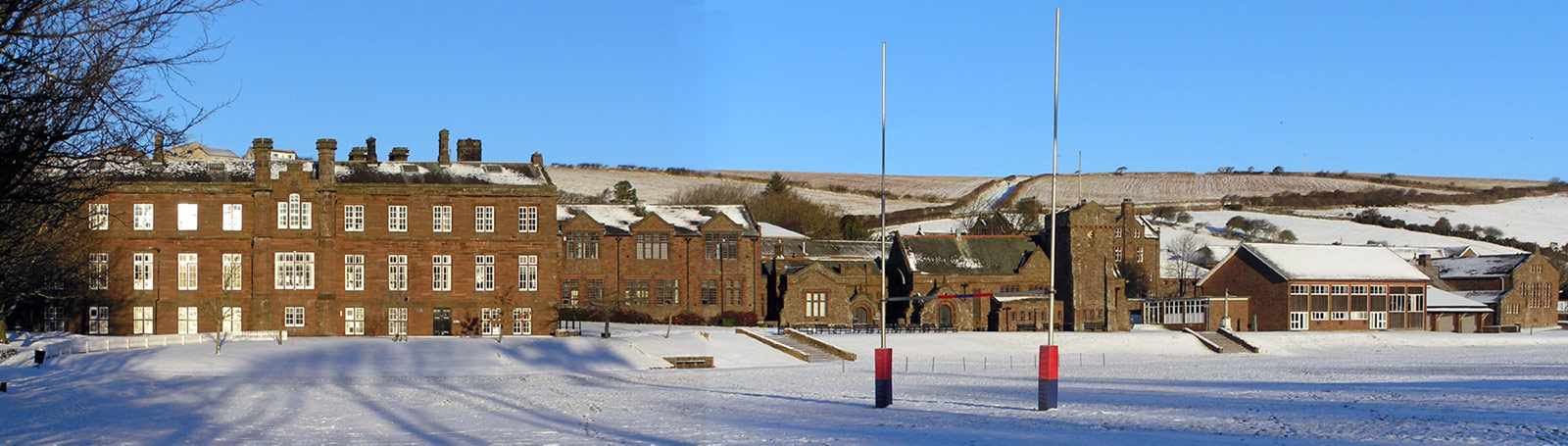
St. Bees School, Cumbria, seen from the edge of the "Firsts" in winter

Help was at hand, but during the Second World War, Mill Hill School was evacuated to St Bees after their buildings were occupied by the government.

Under-used facilities could now be put to good use, to the financial benefit of St Bees School. The two schools were run independently, and sports teams from each school would frequently play against each other.

The cadet corps of the two schools combined with village volunteers to form the St Bees Home Guard.

=== Post-war expansion ===
Seventy-two boys died during the Second World War, and the Memorial Hall was established in their memory.

During the 1950s, a new science block was built, formally opened by Barnes Wallis in 1959, and in the 1970s the school became co-educational.

New boarding houses were purchased off-campus for both girls and boys, Bega House and Abbot's Court respectively.

To celebrate the school's quatercentenary in 1983, an appeal was launched which would give the school a new sports hall, opened in 1988.

In the 1990s the Whitelaw Building was inaugurated by Prince Charles. It was a multi-function business centre and teaching area, which was named after the then chairman of the board of Governors, William Whitelaw, sometime Deputy Prime Minister of the United Kingdom.

In 2000, Barony House was refurbished entirely and renamed the Fox Music Centre in memory of old St Beghain Bill Fox. To mark the millennium, a time capsule was buried in the northeast corner of the Quadrangle.

In September 2008, a Preparatory Department was launched, catering for pupils from the age of 8 until they joined the main school. At this time, a nearby independent school with a prep department, Harecroft Hall, had just closed.

The school again expanded in September 2010 to include pupils from age four.

== Closure and reopening ==
On 13 March 2015, it was announced without prior warning by the school governors that due to falling pupil numbers the school would close in summer 2015. In response, a four-point rescue plan was proposed on 23 March by a "rescue team" made up of interested parties. However, on 17 April 2015, it was confirmed by the governors that the school would shut down. A formal statement said that the governors were also trustees of the St Bees Foundation and that they are committed to it having a future in education in west Cumbria and "to the use of the site as support both for the future activities of the foundation and the village of St Bees."

On 20 March 2017, it was announced that the school would re-open in partnership with Full Circle Education Group after refurbishment. The school re-opened on 6 September 2018.

== Academic performance ==
The school's most recent Ofsted inspection was in 2018, six months after the school reopened with 10 pupils. Following this inspection, Ofsted inspectors rated the school 'good' on their quality scale.

One of the aims of St Bees is to provide an opportunity for pupils to appreciate the arts as well as to experience the benefit of time on stage and behind the scenes. Music is also featured strongly in the curriculum.

== Old St. Beghians ==
Former pupils of St Bees School are styled 'Old St. Beghians.' An Old St. Beghians' Club was founded in 1908 by master J. W. Aldous. Today, it is known as the 'Old St. Beghians' Society' and provides a link between the students and the school.

Among other things, it organizes "Old St Beghians Day" once a year, publishes a magazine called the Old St. Beghian twice a year, and both holds and participates in many golfing tournaments. There are several regional branches of the society which traditionally hold annual meals and reunions.

Notable Old St. Beghains include two Vice-Chancellors of the University of Cambridge, a number of professors, and three Victoria Cross recipients. The comedian and actor Rowan Atkinson also attended the school as a pupil.

== See also ==
- List of headmasters of St. Bees School
- List of Old St. Beghians
- List of the oldest schools in the United Kingdom
- List of the oldest schools in the world
- Listed buildings in St Bees

== Reference list ==
- Aldous, J. W. (1921). St. Bees School Roll of Honour and Record of Service. Edinburgh: University Press.
- Special Committee, Old St. Beghians' Club (1939). The Story of St. Bees 1583–1939: a souvenir of the 350th anniversary of the opening of St. Bees School. London: Buck & Wooton. OCLC 223279332.
- Strype, John (1974) [1710]. The history of the life and acts of the Most Reverend Father in God, Edmund Grindal: the first Bishop of London, and the Second Archbishop of York and Canterbury successively, in the reign of Queen Elizabeth, to which is added an appendix of original mss.; in two books. New York: Burt Franklin research & source works series. OCLC 313493627.
