= Church of England parish church =

Religious centre within a Church of England parish

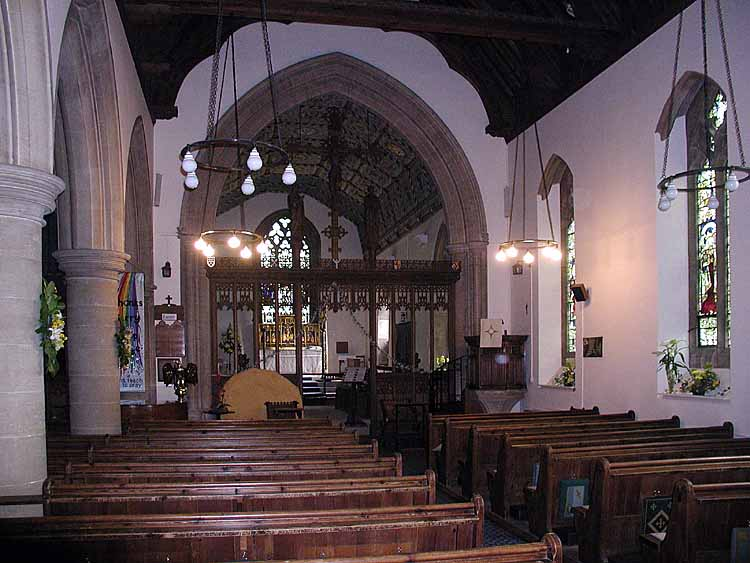
The parish church of St. Lawrence at Bourton-on-the-Water, Gloucestershire, England (pictured 2003)

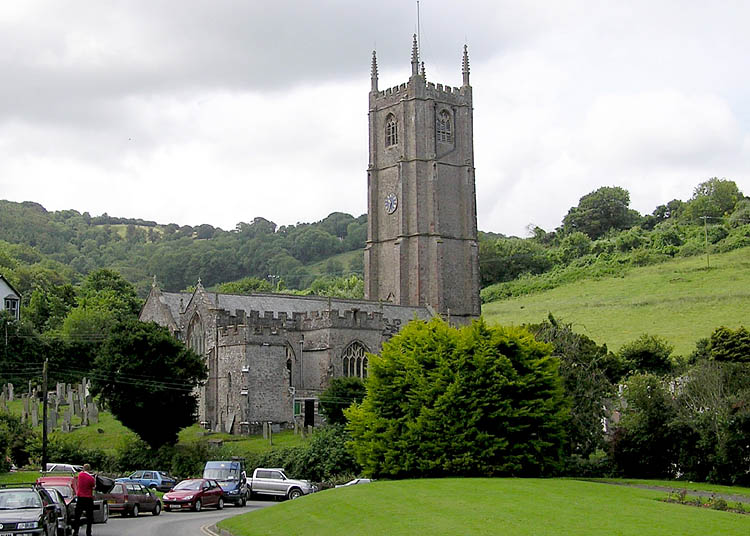
Combe Martin parish church (St. Peter ad Vincula), North Devon, England (pictured 2004)

A parish church in the Church of England is the church which acts as the religious centre for the people within each Church of England parish (the smallest and most basic Church of England administrative unit; since the 19th century sometimes called the ecclesiastical parish, to avoid confusion with the civil parish which many towns and villages have).

In many English villages the church is a prominent landmark and its tower is often the tallest structure in the settlement.

== Parishes in England ==
In England, there are parish churches for both the Church of England and the Roman Catholic Church. References to a "parish church", without mention of a denomination, will, however, usually be to those of the Church of England due to its status as the Established Church. This is generally true also for Wales, although the Church in Wales is dis-established.

The Church of England is made up of parishes, each one forming part of a diocese. Almost every part of England is within both a parish and a diocese (there are very few non-parochial areas and some parishes not in dioceses). These ecclesiastical parishes are often no longer the same as the civil parishes in local government. Larger towns and cities, even those with cathedrals, still have ecclesiastical parishes and parish churches.

Each parish is ministered to by a parish priest, usually called a vicar, rector or priest-in-charge. More rarely the parish priest is known as a "perpetual curate". In one instance only the priest is also, by historical custom, officially known as an "archpriest". Each parish usually has one active parish church, though rarely and historically more than one; if there is no parish church, the bishop will usually license another building and may designate it as a Parish Centre of Worship. A parish may also be served by a number of chapels of ease. Unused 'redundant' parish churches may exist in parishes formed by the merging of two or more parishes, or because of the cost of upkeep. These redundant churches may survive as ruins, remain empty, or be converted for alternative uses.

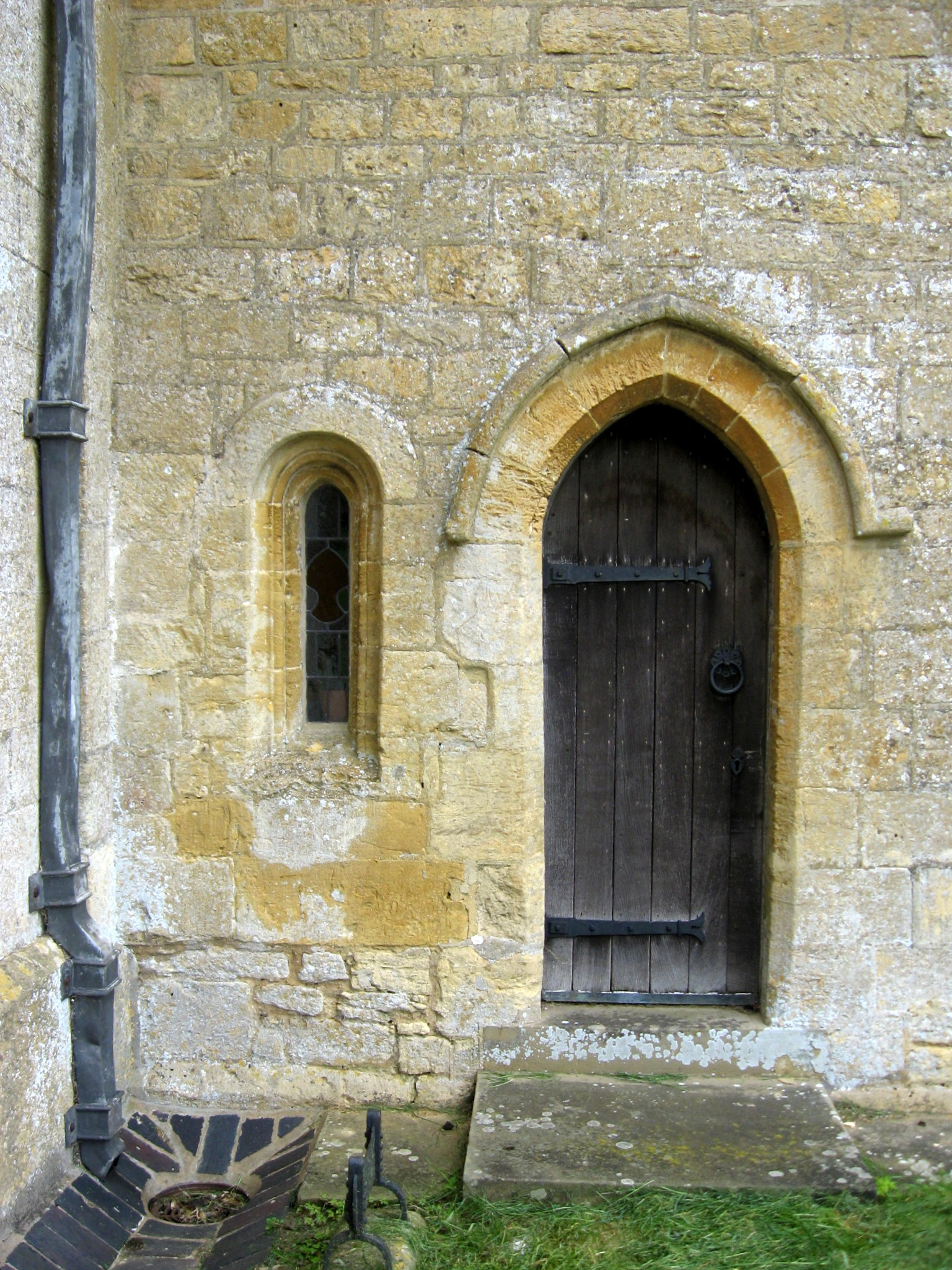
12th-century priest's door and low window of the parish church at Guiting Power, Gloucestershire

== Notable parish churches ==
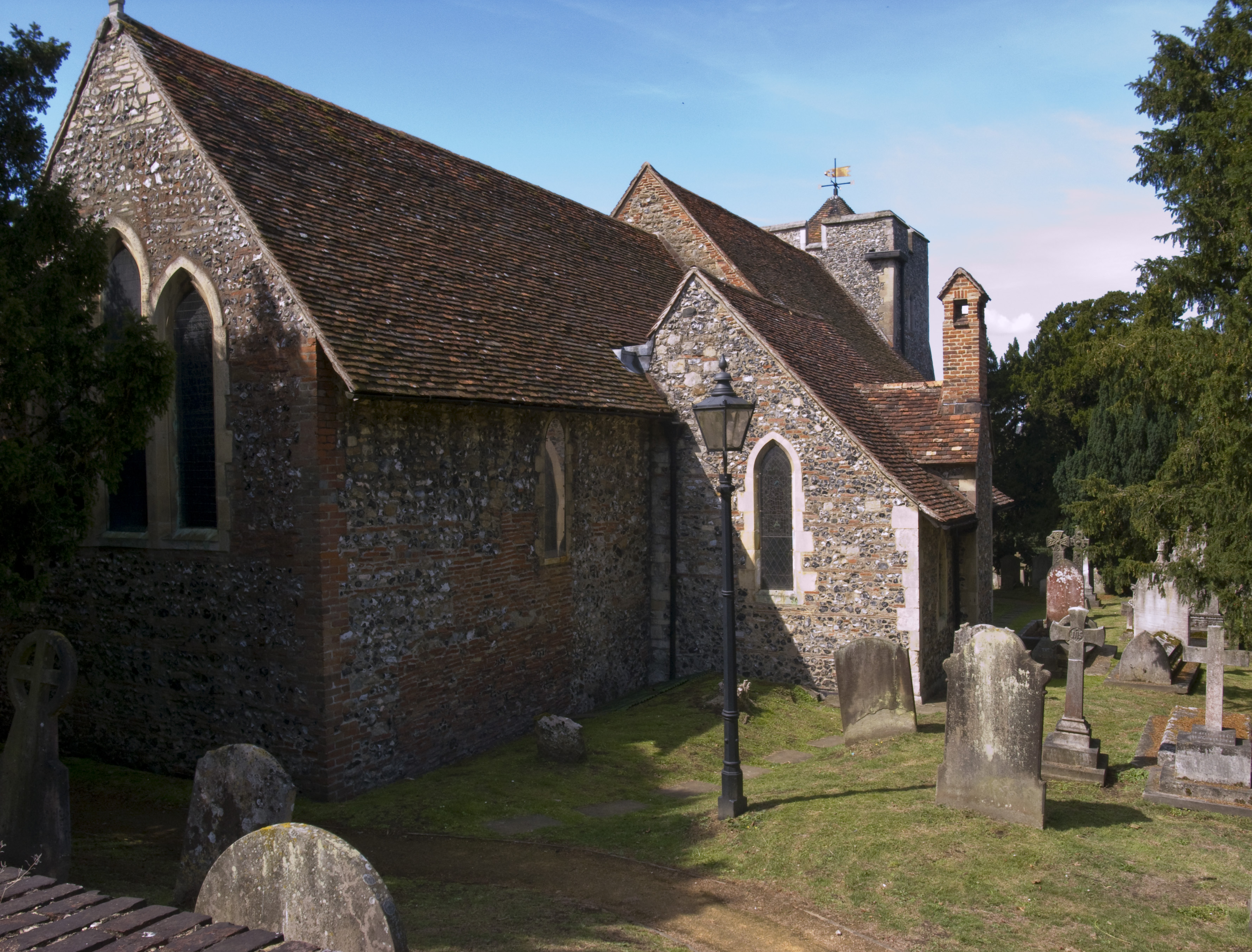
St Martin's Church, Canterbury

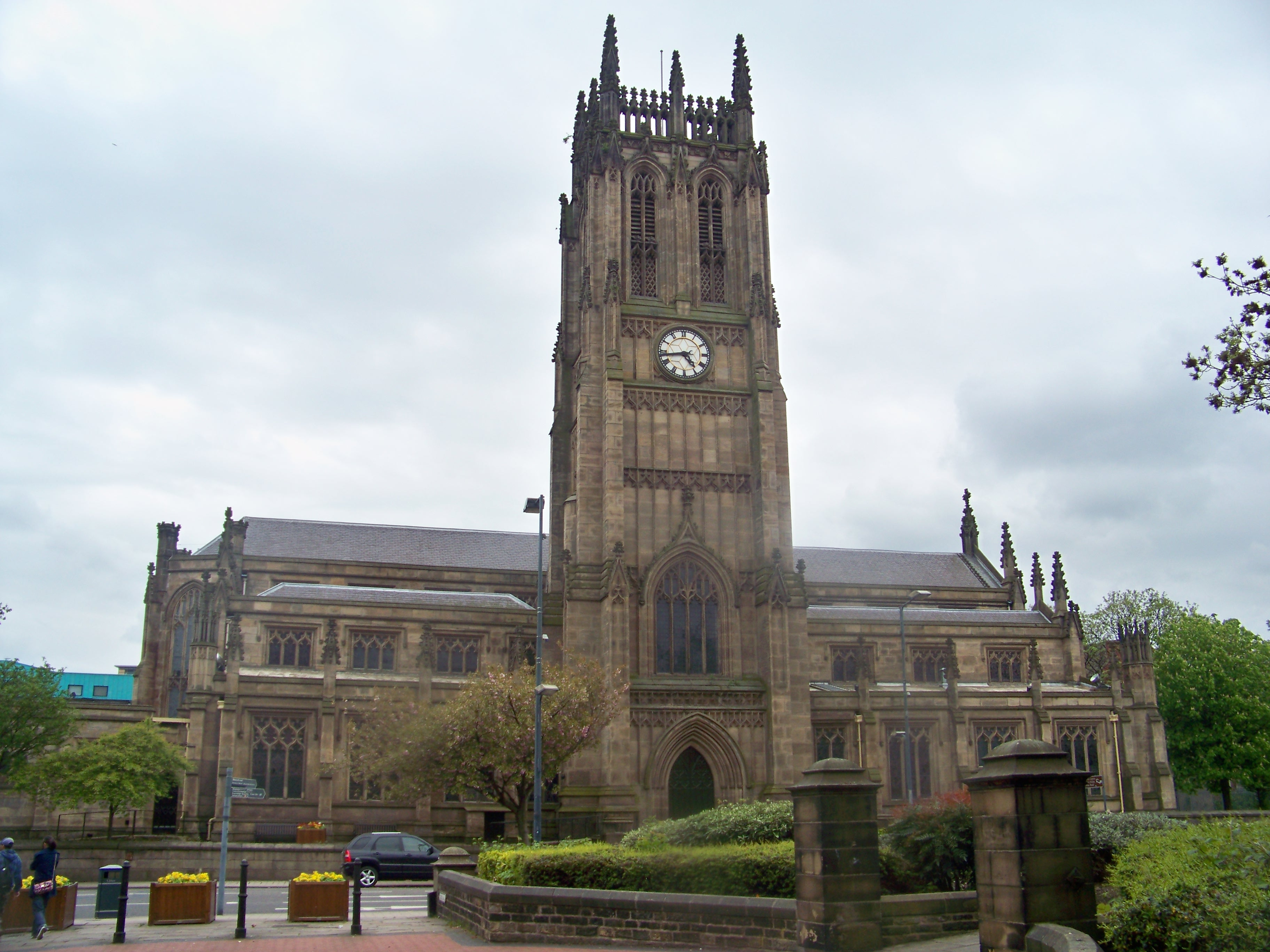
Leeds Parish Church

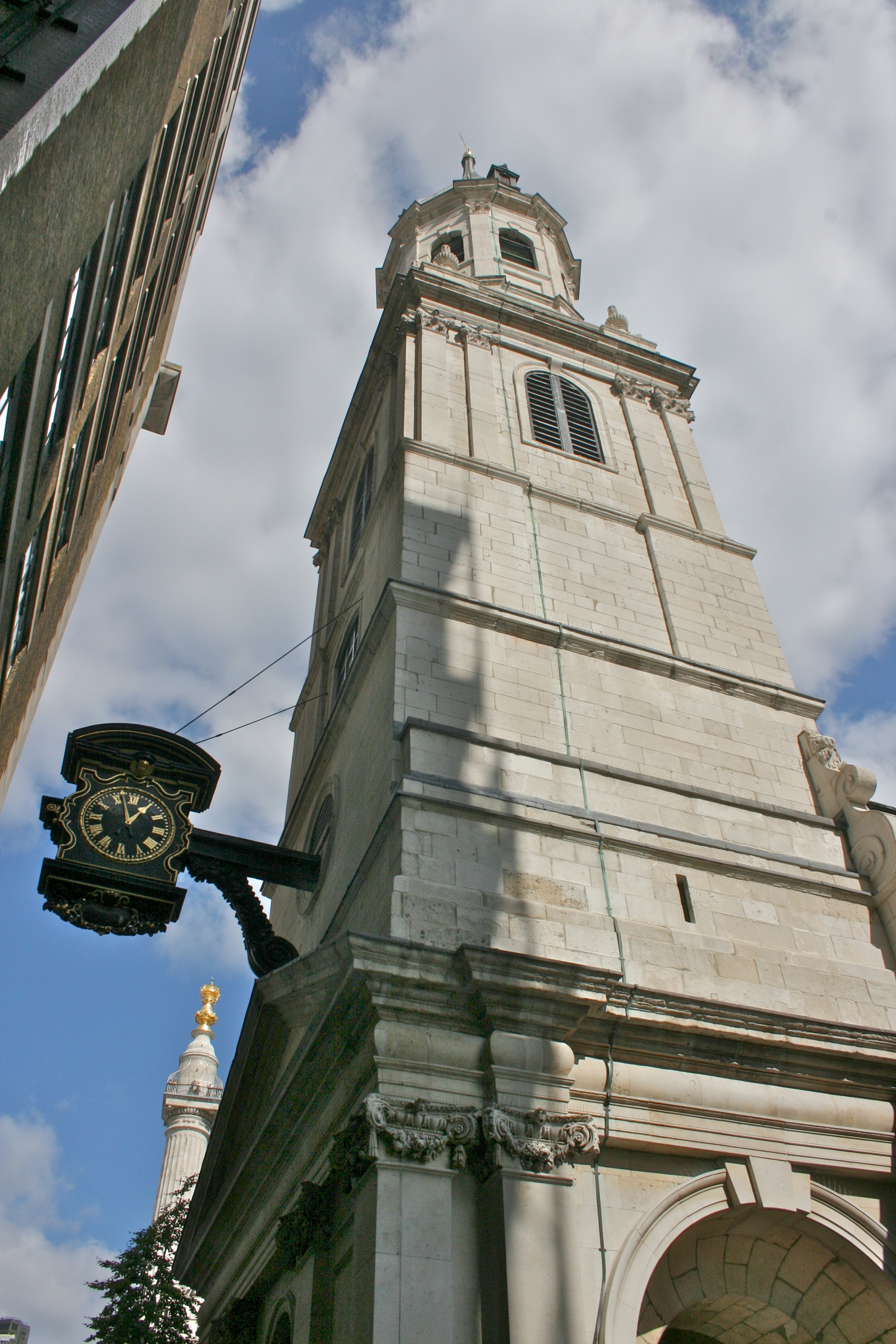
St Magnus the Martyr, London

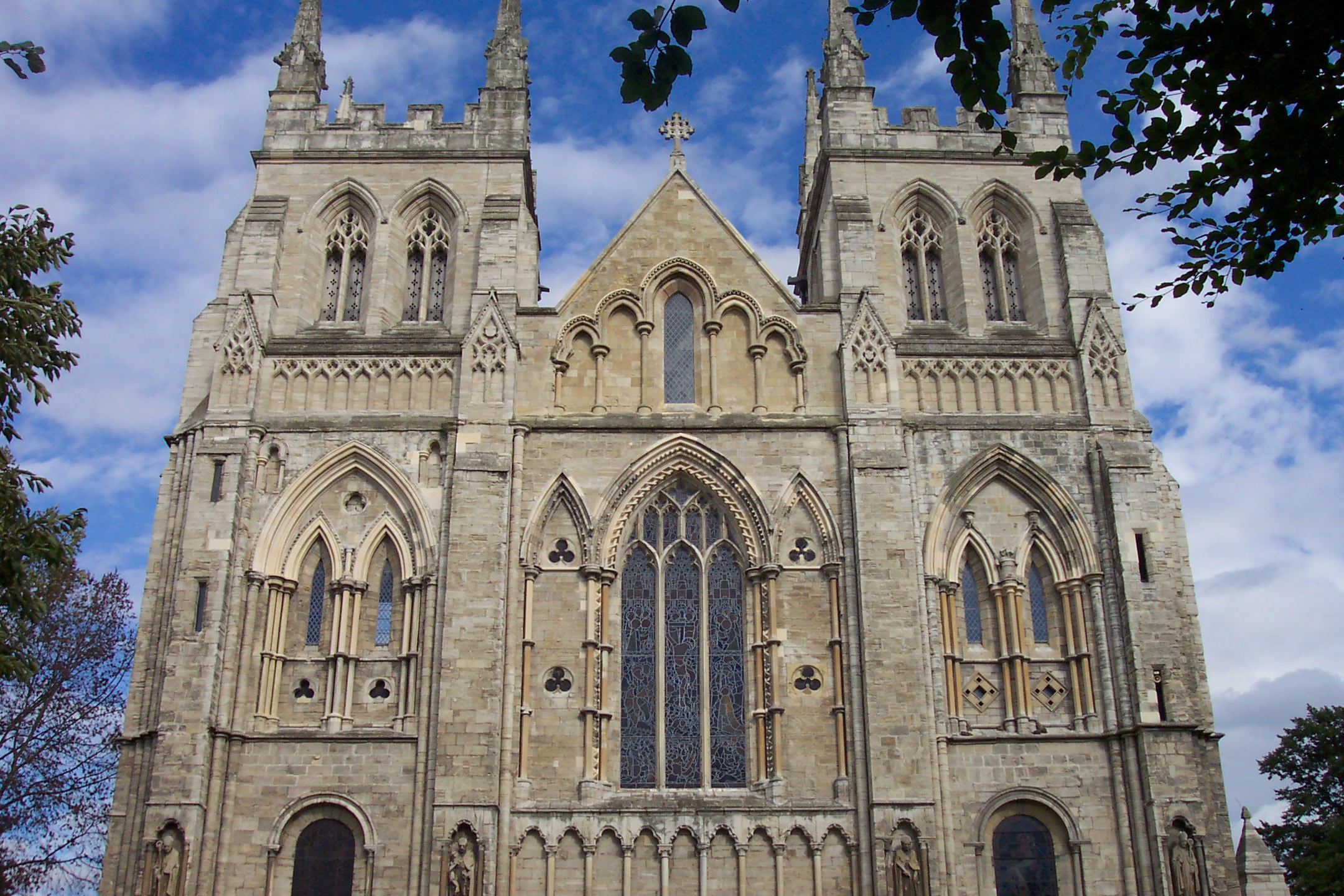
Selby Abbey

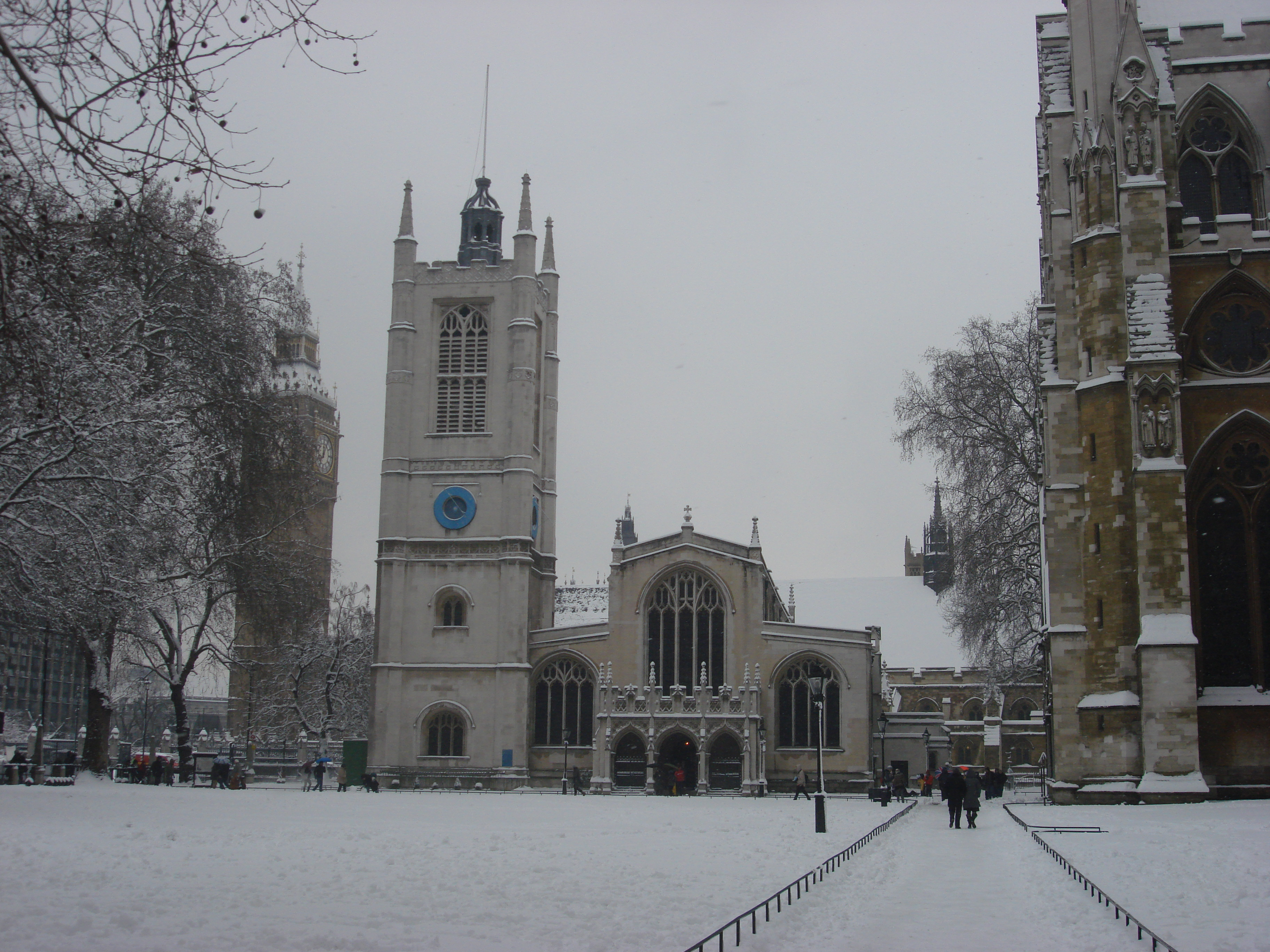
St Margaret's, Westminster

This is a very incomplete list of notable Church of England parish churches:

Location	Name	Description
Ashmanhaugh, Norfolk	St. Swithin	The smallest round-tower church in the UK
Barton-upon-Humber, North Lincolnshire	St Peter's Church	Good Saxon tower
Bedford	St Paul's church	On the site of a former ancient minster, the present medieval 'hall church' was the wartime home of the BBC's The Daily Service. Now the county church with a fine Bodley screen and maintains a choral tradition.
Beverley, East Riding of Yorkshire	Beverley Minster	Perpendicular west front, continuous vault, Percy tomb, Hawksmoor font cover, the largest parish church in England by floor area (3489 m^{2}).
Bodmin, Cornwall	St Petroc's Church	The church building is late medieval and is the largest parish church in Cornwall.
Boston, Lincolnshire	St Botolph's Church	The Stump, lantern interior, 52 misericords.
Brent, London	St Gabriel's, Cricklewood	A New Wine church which is home to an historic organ used in BBC Radio recitals.
Bristol	St Mary Redcliffe Church	Twin porches, Perpendicular interior, 1,200 roof bosses.
Brompton, Kensington, London	Holy Trinity ("HTB")	Evangelical Anglican church where the Alpha course was first developed.
Burford, Oxfordshire	St John's Church	Merchants' guild chapel, Red Indian memorial, Kempe glass.
Bury St Edmunds, Suffolk	St Mary's Church	Burial place of Mary Tudor, Queen of France, sister of Henry VIII, second longest aisle of a Parish Church in England. Hammer beam roof with carved angels. Has a traditional robed choir which has existed for hundreds of years.
Canterbury, Kent	St Martin's	Oldest surviving Church of England parish church of English origin
Christchurch, Dorset	Christchurch Priory	Norman exterior, Decorated screen, Perpendicular tombs and chantries.
Cirencester, Gloucestershire	St John the Baptist's Church	Perpendicular porch, fan vaults, merchants' tombs.
City of London	St Magnus the Martyr	Wren church situated at the end of the old London Bridge.
Crediton, Devon	Crediton Parish Church	A former collegiate church which was rebuilt in the 15th century and has some fine monuments.
Culbone, Somerset	St Culbone's Church	Smallest parish church in England.
Doncaster	St George's Minster	"South Yorkshire's most majestic building".
Earls Barton, Northamptonshire	All Saints' Church	An ancient Saxon church famous for its incredible heritage.
Fairford, Gloucestershire	St Mary's Church	Complete set of medieval glass, stone carvings, misericords.
Gawber, Barnsley	St Thomas the Apostle	A small church in South Yorkshire
Grantham, Lincolnshire	St Wulfram's Church	Steeple and west front, Decorated tracery, Corbel-table carvings.
Great Witley, Worcestershire	St Michael and All Angels	A complete Italian Baroque style in a remote part of England, with painted ceilings and stained-glass windows from the former Cannons House near London
Greensted, Essex	Greensted Church (officially St Andrew's Church)	Probably the only pre-12th century wooden church still in use in the world.
Hull, Yorkshire	Holy Trinity Church	The fourth-largest parish church in England by floor area (2473 m^{2}).
Kendal, Cumbria	Holy Trinity Church	Claims to be the widest parish church in England
Leeds	Minster and Parish Church of St Peter	Leeds has no Anglican cathedral, so the Minster has several administrative functions below those of Bradford, Ripon and Wakefield Cathedrals.
Liverpool	Our Lady and St Nicholas	Liverpool's 'sailors' church', traditional emigrants' landmark on leaving for the New World
Long Melford, Suffolk	Holy Trinity Church	Richest East Anglian church, Clopton Chantry, Lily Crucifix, medieval glass. An example of a wool church.
Ludlow, Shropshire:	St Laurence's Church	Medieval Palmers' glass, Pietà bench-end, civic tombs.
Maidenhead, Berkshire	St Luke's Church	Largest church in Maidenhead
Ottery St Mary, Devon	St Mary's Church, Ottery St Mary	Miniature Exeter Cathedral, painted roof, fan-vaulted aisle.
Patrington, East Riding of Yorkshire	St Patrick's Church	Octagonal tower top, Decorated carvings throughout.
Pershore, Worcestershire	Pershore Abbey	Former abbey restored by George Gilbert Scott
Plymouth, Devon	St Andrew's Church	15th century church rebuilt after the Plymouth Blitz, the largest parish church in Devon.
Selby, North Yorkshire	Selby Abbey	Norman nave, chancel stiff-leaf, east window tracery with medieval glass.
Sherborne, Dorset	Sherborne Abbey	Complete fan vault, carved bosses, misericords.
Tewkesbury, Gloucestershire	Tewkesbury Abbey	Norman nave, 'Sun of York' bosses, Despenser tombs, medieval glass.
Walpole St Peter, Norfolk	St Peter's Church	Nave woodwork, font cover, 'bolt-hole' tunnel.
Warwick, Warwickshire	St Mary's Church	Beauchamp Chapel and tombs.
Westminster, London	All Saints, Margaret Street	Anglo-Catholic shrine.
Westminster, London	St Margaret's	The parish church of the British Houses of Parliament
Wing, Buckinghamshire	All Saints' Church	Anglo-Saxon apse and crypt.

== See also ==
- Churches Conservation Trust
- Historical development of Church of England dioceses
- Architecture of the medieval cathedrals of England
- Stained glass - British glass, 1811-1918
- Greater Churches Group

== Sources ==
- Braun, Hugh (1970). Parish Churches: Their Architectural Development in England. London: Faber & Faber. ISBN 0-5710-9045-1.
- Jenkins, Simon (1999). England's Thousand Best Churches. photog. Paul Barker. London: Allen Lane. ISBN 0-7139-9281-6.
- Morris, Richard (1989). Churches in the Landscape. London: J. M. Dent & Sons.
- Pevsner, N.; et al. (1951–74). The Buildings of England (46 vols.). Harmondsworth: Penguin Books.
