= Harverson =

Harverson is a surname. Notable people with the surname include:

- Alan Harverson (1922–2006), British organist and pianist
- Patrick Harverson (born 1962), British journalist and PR executive
- W. D. Harverson (1903–1992), New Zealand geologist
