= Holy Trinity Sloane Street =

Coordinates: 51.4931°N 0.1575°W

- The Church of the Holy and Undivided Trinity
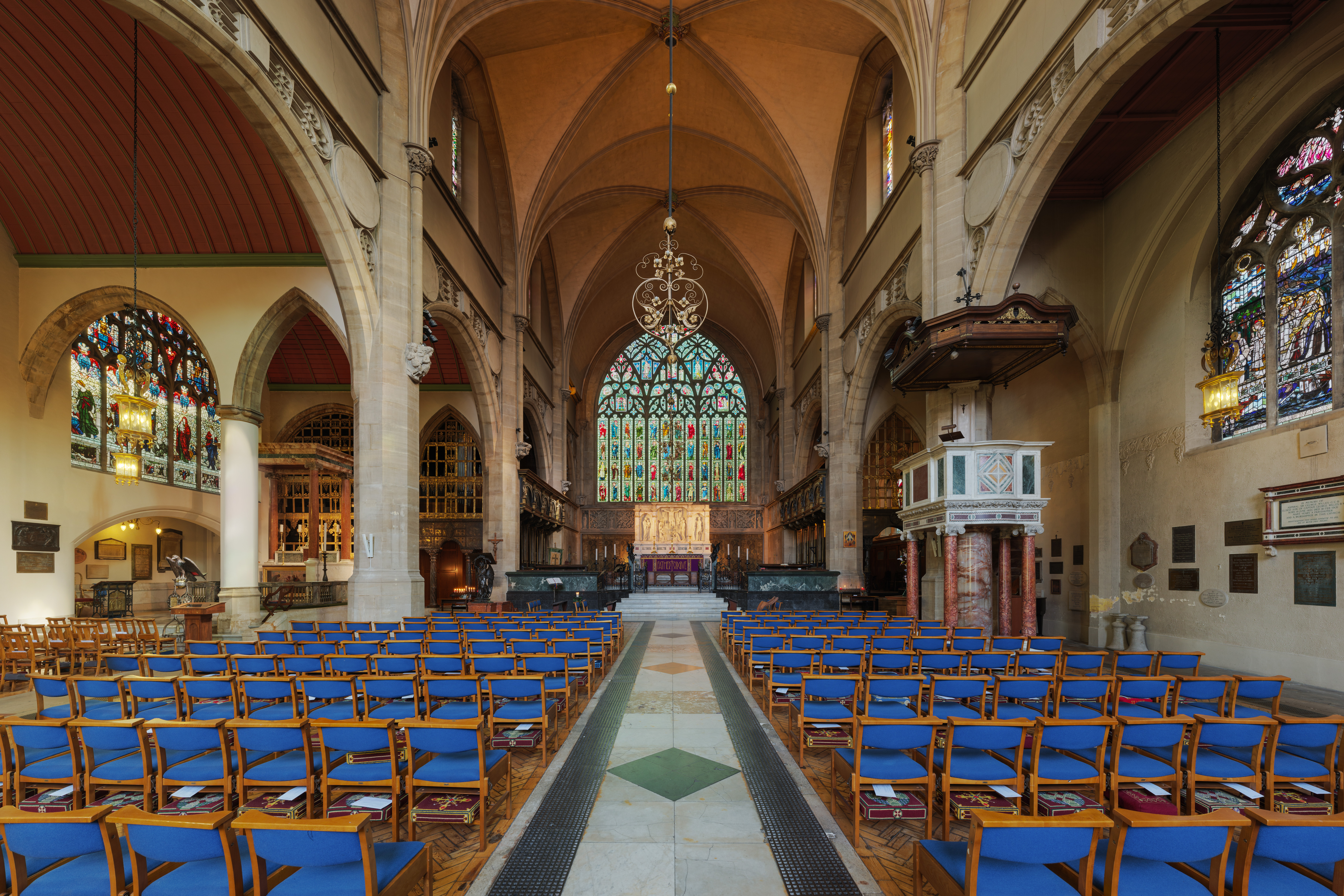
- Holy Trinity Sloane Street
- Location: Sloane Street, London
- Country: England
- Denomination: Anglican
- Churchmanship: Anglo-Catholic
- Website: www.sloanechurch.org

History
- Dedicated: 1890

Architecture
- Heritage designation: Grade I
- Architect: John Dando Sedding
- Style: Arts and Crafts Gothic
- Years built: 1888–1890

Administration
- Diocese: Diocese of London
- Deanery: Chelsea
- Parish: Upper Chelsea, Holy Trinity with St Saviour

Clergy
- Rector: Rev. Canon Michael Robinson

The Church of the Holy and Undivided Trinity with Saint Jude, Upper Chelsea, commonly called Holy Trinity Sloane Street or Holy Trinity Sloane Square, is a Church of England parish church in London, England. The original church was built 1828–30, designed by James Savage, and demolished in 1888. The current building was built 1888–90 at the south-eastern side of Sloane Street in an Arts and Crafts style by the architect John Dando Sedding, and features artworks by several prominent members of the Arts and Crafts movement, including Edward Burne-Jones and Henry Hugh Armstead. The church is a Grade I listed building. It is also noted for its unusually large organ.

== Architecture ==
=== Original building ===
In 1818, Parliament created a commission, via the Church Building Act, to increase the number of churches in places where building work had not kept up with an increase in population, such as Chelsea. In 1821, the commission bought the land for the church from the landowner, Henry Charles Cadogan. A plan for a new church was drawn up by architect George Godwin, but it was rejected as being too expensive. The first church on the site was a Gothic construction of 1828–30 designed by James Savage, with an interior space of 133 ft by 44 feet 10 inches (40.5m by 13.5m). The west front, towards the street, had an entrance flanked by octagonal turrets topped with spires. It was originally intended as chapel of ease to the new parish church of St Luke, but was given its own parish in 1831. It was closed and demolished in 1888, and a temporary iron church with a capacity of 800 was provided in Symons Street while a new building was under construction.

=== Present building ===
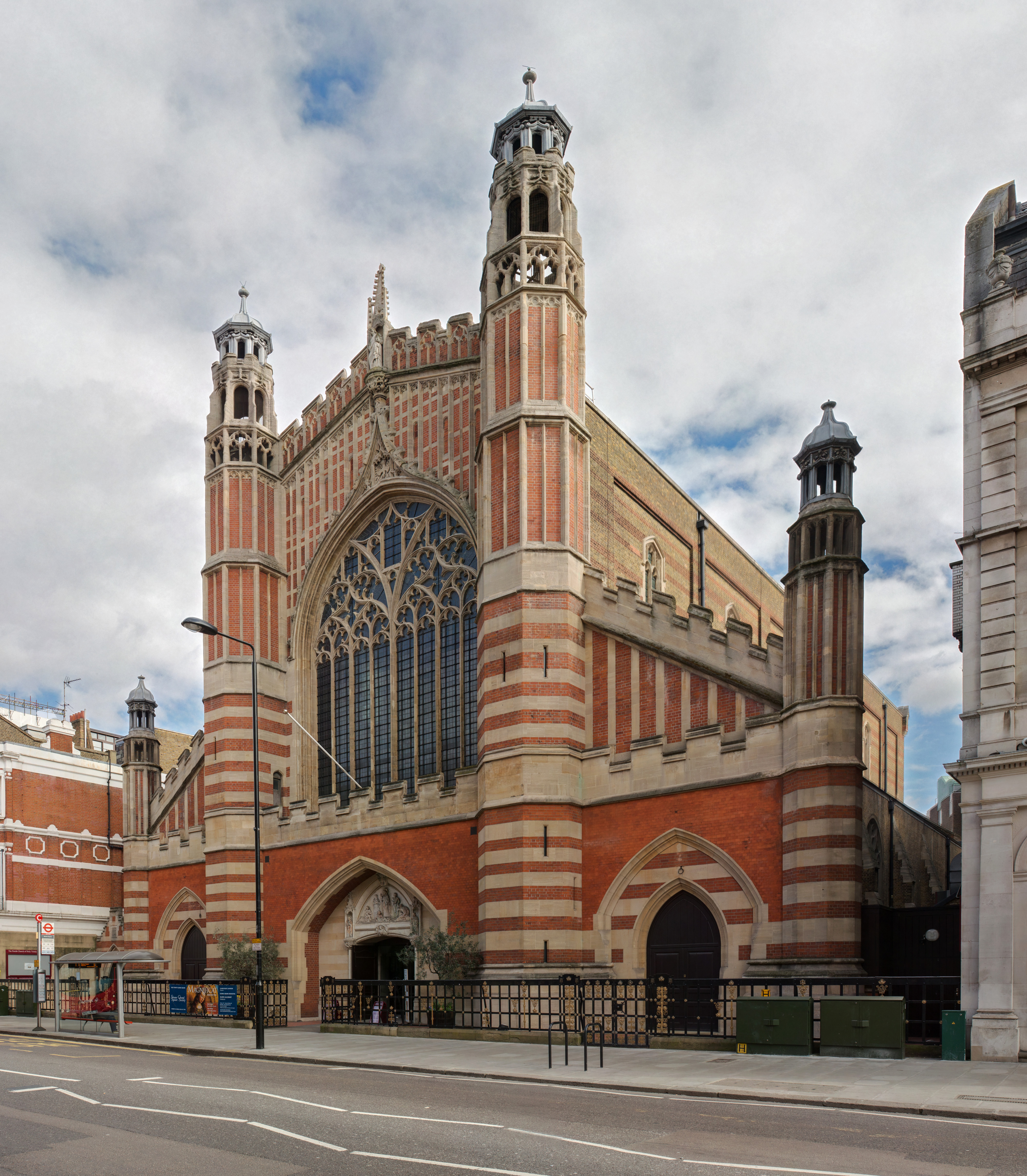
Holy Trinity as viewed from Sloane Street

The new building, the present Holy Trinity, was built on a grand scale to a design by John Dando Sedding. The nave was built unusually wide, at 40ft (12.2m). The grand scale and edifice was built to attract upper- and middle-class residents. Sedding was a member of the Arts and Crafts movement, having trained as an architect under George Edmund Street, as had Philip Webb, Norman Shaw, and, briefly, William Morris. He placed a great deal of importance on hiring master craftsmen to create interiors, and so the church is full of works by artists such as F. W. Pomeroy, H. H. Armstead, Edward Burne-Jones, Onslow Ford, and Hamo Thornycroft. The new church was consecrated in May 1890. Sedding died in 1891 (his memorial can be seen on the north wall in the Lady Chapel) and his assistant Henry Wilson took charge of the project to complete the interior decoration of the building to the original design. In part, he failed, for some of the glass was never installed, nor was the important addition of a frieze beneath the high windows even attempted. Some of the internal sculpture or carving is still incomplete. In the 1920s the interior was whitened by F. C. Eden, lightening the character and feel of the building considerably.

The church was hit by incendiary bombs twice during the Second World War; once in September 1940, damaging the roof of the Lady Chapel; and again on 10 May 1941, when the entire main roof was destroyed. A new, permanent roof was completed in 1951. In 1954, the church became a Grade I listed building. However, the church still needed tens of thousands of pounds for repairs. By 1969 the church was £4,000 in debt, and plans were announced to demolish it and build a block of flats, using the proceeds to build a smaller church. This idea was condemned by the poet John Betjeman as "the height of irresponsibility". After a campaign by Betjeman and the Victorian Society, the plans were scrapped.

== Artworks ==
The forged-iron screen was designed by Henry Wilson and features scrolling golden vines. During the Second World War, the screen was officially protected from being melted down for the war effort.

The church has an important collection of stained glass, including an enormous east window by Morris & Co, the largest the company ever made. Most of the design is by Edward Burne-Jones, with William Morris working on the figure of St Bartholomew and his assistant George Campfield drawing the foliage. The Lady Chapel has three windows designed by William Blake Richmond and made by James Powell & Sons, who also made the window in the Memorial Chapel. The south aisle and clerestory windows are by Christopher Whall.

The church contains sculptures by H. H. Armstead, F. W. Pomeroy, Hamo Thornycroft, John Tweed, and Harry Bates, many of whom were members of the New Sculpture movement. Pomeroy created oak sculptures of English saints and divines surrounded by angels playing musical instruments for the choir. Tweed sculpted the reredos, featuring scenes from the crucifixion. The altar front shows a marble relief of Christ in the tomb, by Harry Bates. In two of the church's spandrels are medallions by H. H. Armstead showing the prophets Isaiah and Jonah. The other spandrels' medallions were never completed, and are blank.

Artworks of Holy Trinity Sloane Street
Ironwork gates designed by Henry Wilson

The east window, designed by Edward Burne-Jones, William Morris and George Campfield

Choir reliefs and statues by F. W. Pomeroy

Reredos by John Tweed, showing the crucifixion

== Music ==
=== Organ ===
Sir Walter Alcock in 1913

John Sedding, himself an organist, provided an unusually large chamber for the noted four-manual J. W. Walker & Sons Ltd organ in the north-east corner. The instrument was badly damaged by enemy action in the Second World War but was repaired in 1947 and partially rebuilt twenty years later in 1967. A definitive rebuild by Harrison & Harrison was completed in August 2012, with the aim of restoring and enlarging the instrument by about 45%, using the surviving Walker pipework and matching new material, confirming its former position as one of the principal organs in London. There are seventy-one speaking stops and approximately 4,200 pipes.

Notable organists have included Edwin Lemare (1892–95), Sir Walter Alcock (1895–1902), John Ireland (sub-organist 1895-1902), and Henry Balfour (1902–42).

The composer John Ireland was Alcock's assistant and had hoped to be promoted when the latter left in 1902, but was regarded as too young to take over. Alcock, on the staff at Westminster Abbey after leaving Holy Trinity, played the organ for three coronations and later moved to Salisbury Cathedral. Later players and assistants have included Ian Curror and Simon Lindley, Arnold Greir and, most notably, Alan Harverson (sometime Professor of Organ at the Royal Academy of Music), Michael Brough, Richard Townend, Andrew O’Brien, Cameron Burns, James Brown and Oliver Lallemant.

=== Choirs ===
The church's main choir is Holy Trinity Choir, composed of four professional singers plus four choral scholars, who perform on Sunday mornings and on feast days. The church also hosts an amateur choir called Conqordia once or twice a month, and Holy Trinity Evensong Choir performs at evensong. The church also hosts visiting choirs at evensong.

== Notable people associated with the church ==
In 1924, the priest Percy Dearmer started to work at Holy Trinity, and started a regular children's service called the "Children's Rally". He was nicknamed "Dusty Joe" by the choir boys for his habit of wearing a grey cassock rather than the more usual black.

There is a memorial on the north wall of the church to Archibald Sturrock (1816–1909), the Chief Locomotive Engineer of the Great Northern Railway from 1850 to 1866. After his early retirement from the railway, he became a magistrate and lived in Upper Chelsea.

The actor Ernest Thesiger was a lifelong member of the church, frequently served as an usher and also sometimes read the lesson. He was sufficiently active as a member of the congregation at Holy Trinity in the inter-war years to pay for the completion of some of the carved stonework in the chancel.

The poet John Betjeman wrote two poems about the church, both called Holy Trinity, Sloane Street.
