= Parish church =

Church acting as the religious centre of a parish

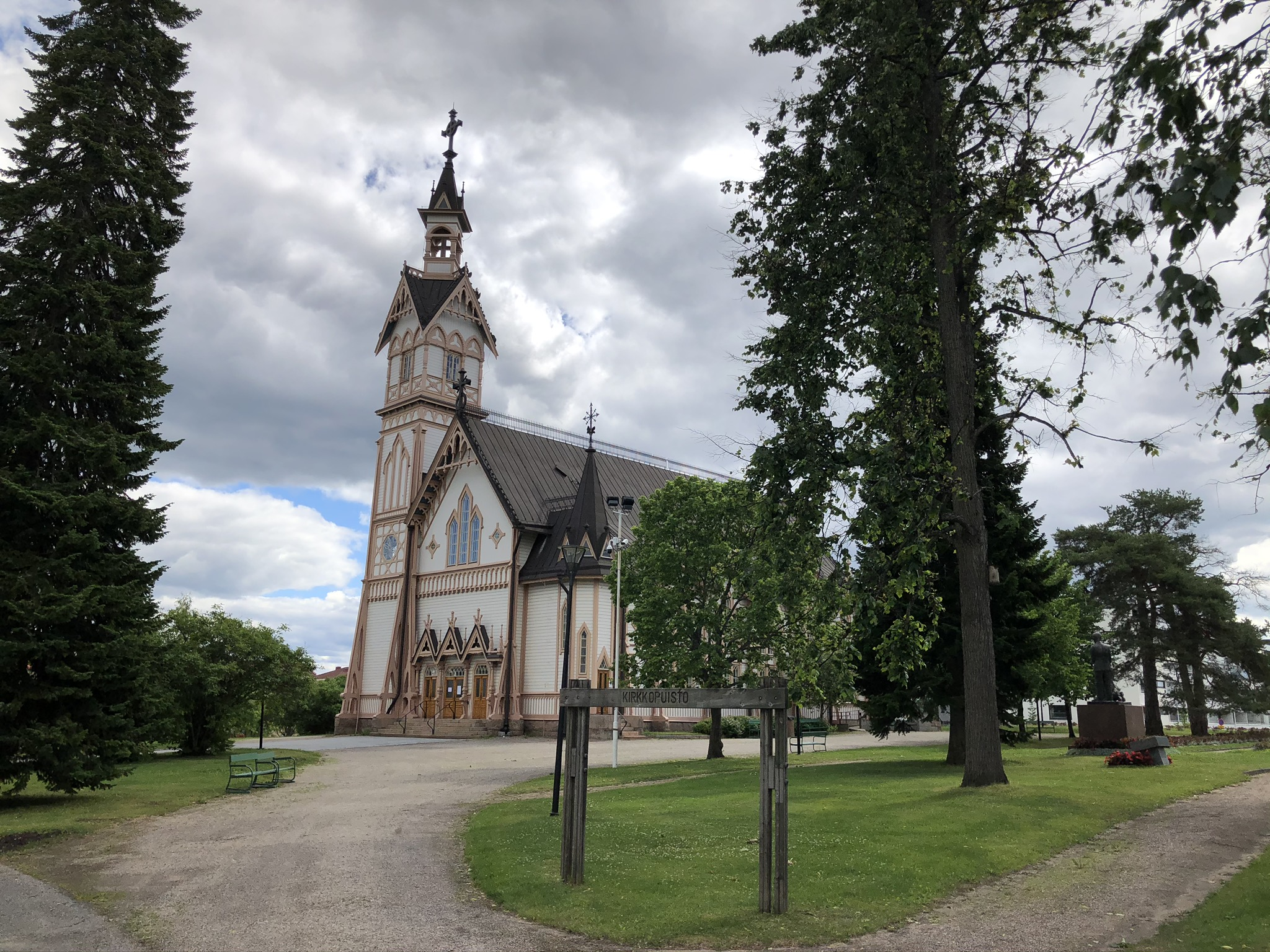
Kajaani Church, an Evangelical-Lutheran parish church located in the Kainuu region of Finland

In Christianity, a parish church or parochial church is a church which acts as the religious centre of a parish. In many parts of the world, especially in rural areas, the parish church may play a significant role in community activities, often allowing its premises to be used for non-religious community events. The church building reflects this status, and there is considerable variety in the size and style of parish churches. Many villages in Europe have churches that date back to the Middle Ages, but all periods of architecture are represented.

Toward the end of the 20th century, a new resurgence in interest in parish churches emerged across the United States. This has given rise to efforts like the Slow Church Movement and The Parish Collective which focus heavily on localized involvement across work, home, and church life.

== Catholic Church ==
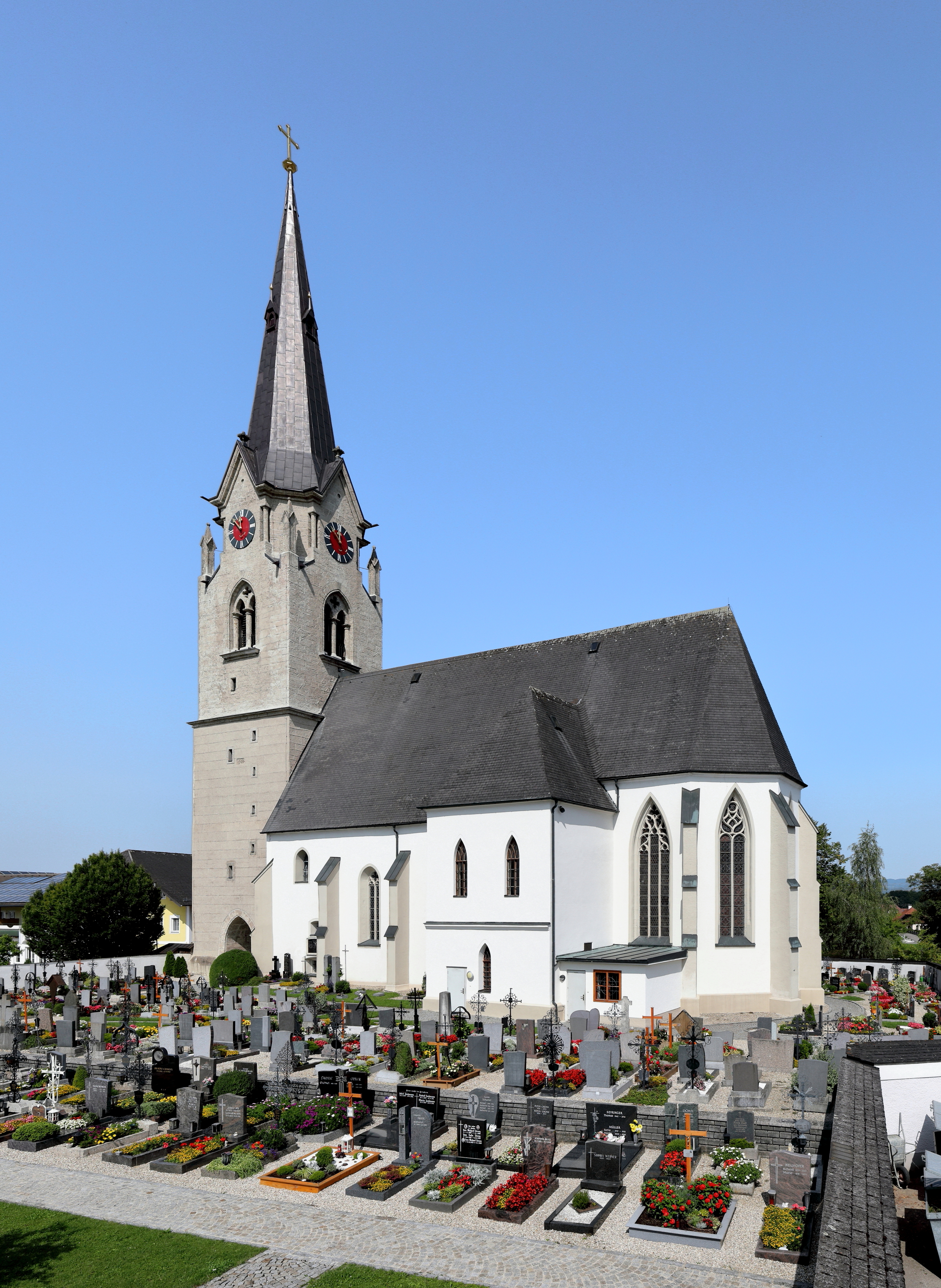
The Catholic parish church of Gampern, Upper Austria

Each diocese (administrative unit, headed by a bishop) is divided into parishes. Normally, a parish consists of all Catholics living within its geographically defined area. Within a diocese, there can also be overlapping parishes for Catholics belonging to a particular rite, language, nationality, or community.

Each parish has its own central church called the parish church, where religious services take place. The parish church is the center of most Catholics' spiritual life since it is there that they receive the sacraments. On Sundays and perhaps also daily, Mass is celebrated by a priest resident in the parish. Confession is made available and perhaps Vespers in the larger or more progressive parishes. There are also laity-led activities and social events in accordance with local culture and circumstances.

Roman Catholics are not obliged to worship only at the parish church to which they belong, but they may for convenience or taste, attend services at any Roman Catholic church. However, their parish church is the one, where members of the parish must go to, for baptisms and weddings, unless they are permitted by the parish priest for celebrating those sacraments elsewhere. One sign of that is the parish church being the only one to have a baptismal font.

Some larger parishes or parishes that have been combined under one parish priest, may have two or more such churches, or the parish may be responsible for chapels (or chapels of ease) located at some distance from the mother church for the convenience of distant parishioners.

In Massachusetts, towns elected publicly funded parish churches from 1780 until 1834, under the Constitution of Massachusetts.

== Lutheran Churches ==
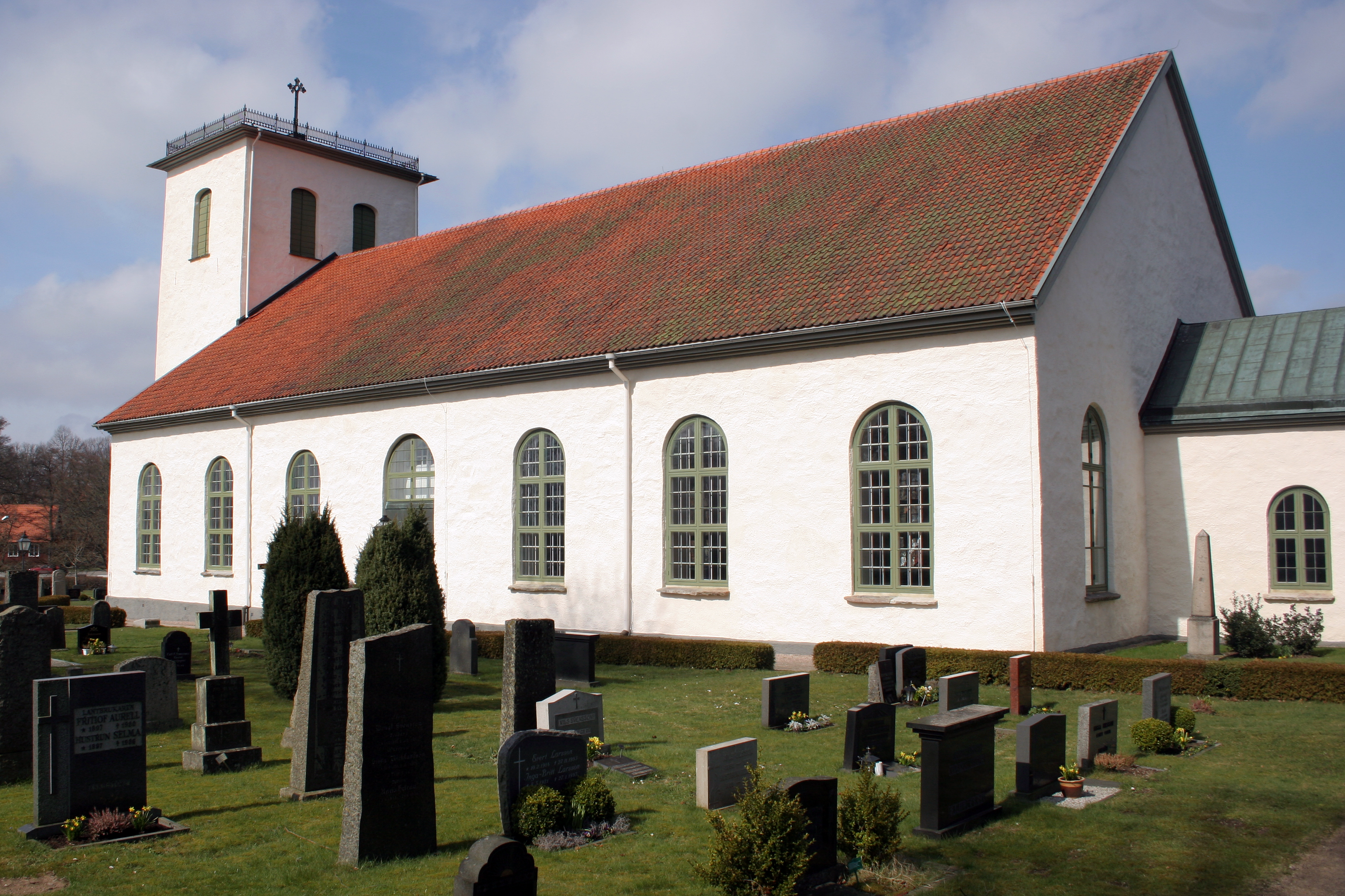
Parish church of Glimåkra in Scania, Sweden

In the Lutheran Churches, parishes (Swedish: socken or församling) are territorial, meaning that they include the people living within its boundaries.

At the end of the 19th century, the Church of Sweden possessed 2,000 parishes.

== Anglicanism and Presbyterianism ==
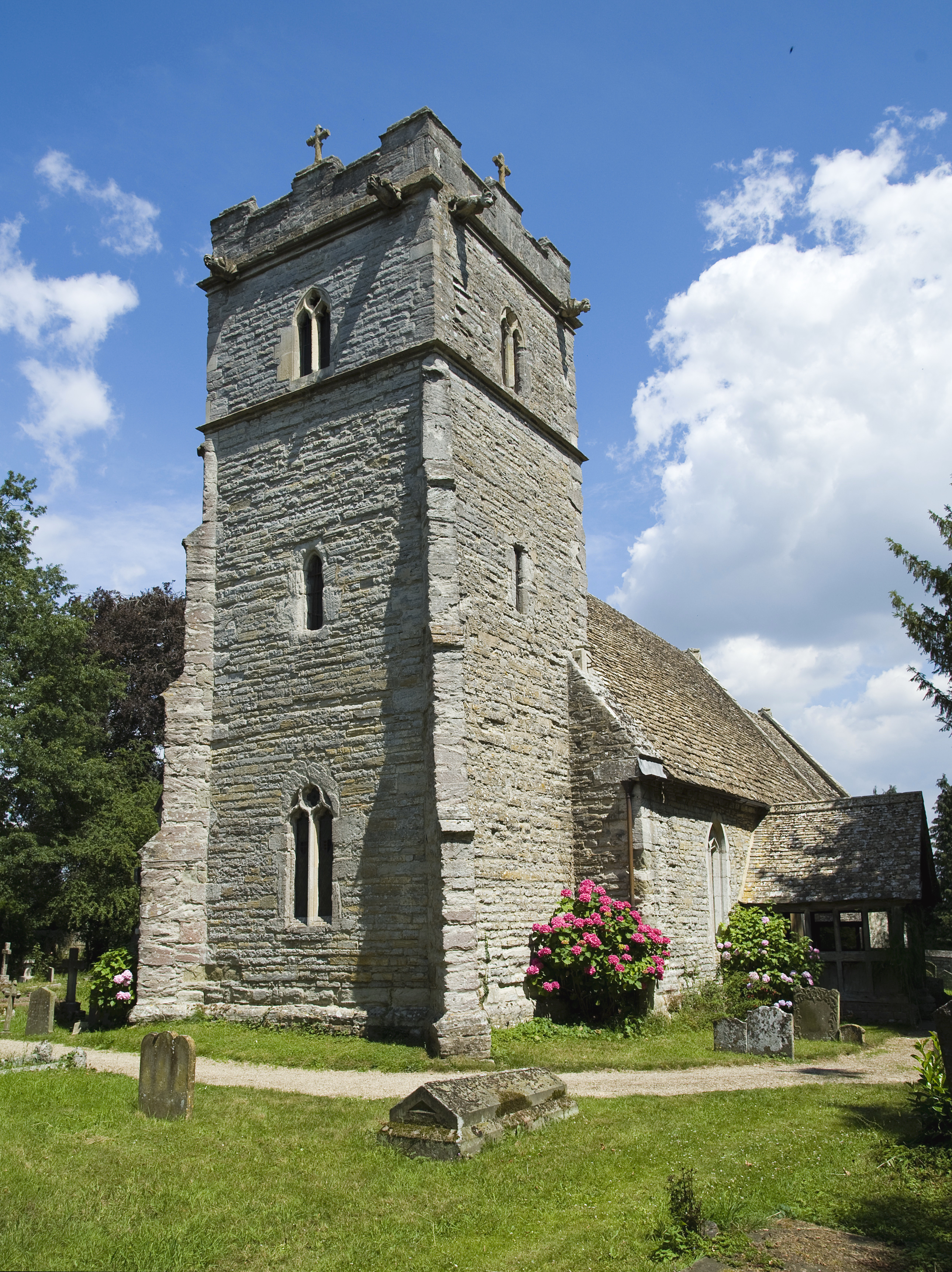
A parish church in Gloucestershire, England

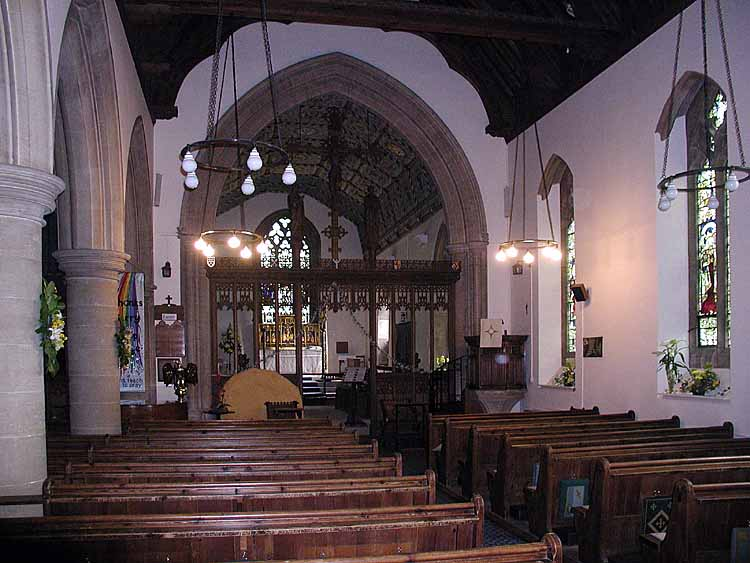
The interior of the Anglican parish church of Saint Lawrence in Bourton-on-the-Water in Gloucestershire, England

In England and many British Overseas Territories as well as former British territories, the Church of England parish church is the basic administrative unit of episcopal churches. Parishes cover almost the whole area of England. In addition to ecclesiastic parishes, with which this article is concerned, there is also a system of civil parishes, which represent the smallest tier of administrative units. However since the 19th century these have not shared the same boundaries, or often the same names. (In other territories arrangements may differ, e.g. in Bermuda civil and church parishes still share the same boundaries, see Anglican Church of Bermuda). Most ecclesiastical parishes have an Anglican parish church, which is consecrated. If there is no parish church, the bishop licenses another building for worship, and may designate it as a parish centre of worship. This building is not consecrated, but is dedicated, and for most legal purposes it is deemed to be a parish church. In areas of increasing secularisation or shifts in religious belief, centres of worship are becoming more common, and many larger churches have been sold due to their upkeep costs. Instead the church may use community centres or the facilities of a local church of another denomination.

While villages and small towns may have a single parish church, larger towns may have a parish church and other smaller churches in various districts. These other churches do not have the legal or religious status of a parish church, and may be described by a variety of terms, such as chapel of ease (this term more often refers to an additional church in a geographically extensive rural parish) or mission church. Often the parish church will be the only one to have a full-time minister, who will also serve any smaller churches within the parish. (For example, St. Peter's Church in St. George's Parish, Bermuda, is located on St. George's Island; hence, a chapel-of-ease, named simply Chapel-of-Ease, was erected on neighbouring St. David's Island so that the island's residents need not cross St. George's Harbour.)

In cities without an Anglican cathedral, the parish church may have administrative functions similar to that of a cathedral. However, the diocese will still have a cathedral.

The Church of Scotland, the established Presbyterian church, also uses a system of parish churches, covering the whole of Scotland - this commitment to serve the whole people of Scotland is set down in the third of its Declaratory Articles. At the end of 2024, there were 924 congregations - some utilising more than one parish church building.

== See also ==
- Saint-Sauveur Abbey Church of Redon
