= St Gabriel's, Cricklewood =

Coordinates: 51°33′8.683″N 0°13′4.818″W

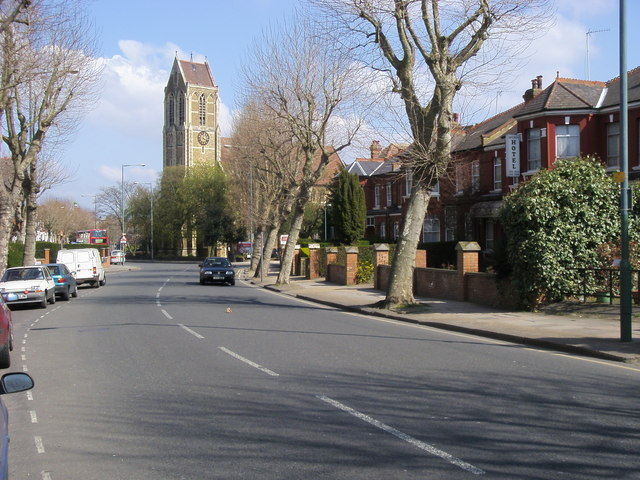
- St Gabriel's Church and Walm Lane in 2009
- St Gabriel's, Cricklewood
- Location: St Gabriel's Church, Walm Lane, Cricklewood, Brent, London, NW2 4RX
- Country: England
- Denomination: Church of England
- Website: http://www.st-gabriels.org

History
- Dedicated: 1829

Architecture
- Years built: 1897–1906

Administration
- Diocese: Diocese of London
- Deanery: London Borough of Brent

Clergy
- Vicar: James Yeates

St Gabriel's, Cricklewood, is an Anglican church in Cricklewood, Brent, London, United Kingdom.

St Gabriel's has links to New Wine and Holy Trinity Brompton Church. The church has been positively reviewed by the ecumenical Ship of Fools website.

== History ==
The first Church of England service in the Cricklewood area was held in 1891, led by Rev George Marsh Clibborn. It took place in a milliner's shop in Oaklands Road. Later meetings took place in a local school room. In 1891, a building known as the ‘Iron Church’ was erected on the area where St Gabriel's now stands, and which opened for worship in that same year. A further church was constructed alongside the Iron Church, which opened in 1897. Further building works were completed in 1906.

A large church hall was later built on Anson Road, and after the second world war sold to the local council for community use. The local council then sold the building to the Dar Al-Islam Foundation. The present church hall is located in a smaller building, next to the former hall, on Chichele Road.

The St Gabriel's church organ was a post-war neo-classical Walker organ. The organ was used by a number of organists, including Brian Bromley, Organist Emeritus and Alan Harverson, Professor of the Royal Academy of Music; and many choirs, including the Linden Singers. The organ has since been relocated, to create additional storage space.

The church area is located close to Willesden Green tube station, in a now predominantly residential and ethnically diverse area.

The current vicar is James Yeates, who has been at St Gabriel's since January 2020.

His predecessor, Jane Morris announced her plans to retire in 2018. In autumn 2010, Morris stood for election to serve the Diocese of London at the General Synod of the Church of England. Morris was proposed by the Revd John Coles, the leader of New Wine and was elected to the General Synod. Morris also recently backed a unity statement against plans by the English Defence League to protest at an event held by a Muslim charity in Wembley.

== Ministry areas ==
Sunday services at St Gabriel's include a morning worship service at 10:30 am and an evening worship service at 6:30 pm.

St Gabriel's offers a number of community activities, including: Gabriel's Café; activities for young children, such as Little Angels, Boogie Babies and The Ark; classes for learning English; and a Christians Against Poverty centre. St Gabriel's also runs a number of courses, including Alpha, Alpha Youth, and the CAP Money Course.

== Christians Against Poverty ==
St Gabriel's runs a debt centre, overseen by Christians Against Poverty. It aims to provide debt and counselling to local members of the local community, regardless of their own faith.

Brent Council highlighted this work in its January 2011 edition of 'Brent Magazine'. The project offers to manage a person's debt by organising their repayments, as well as offering advice and work to reduce any payments. The Council observed that people do not need to be Christians to receive any help.

The project is led by Debbie Thomas, St Gabriel's CAP centre manager.

== See also ==
- Church of England
- New Wine
- Holy Trinity Brompton Church
- Christians against Poverty
