= Stiff-leaf =

Form of carved foliage

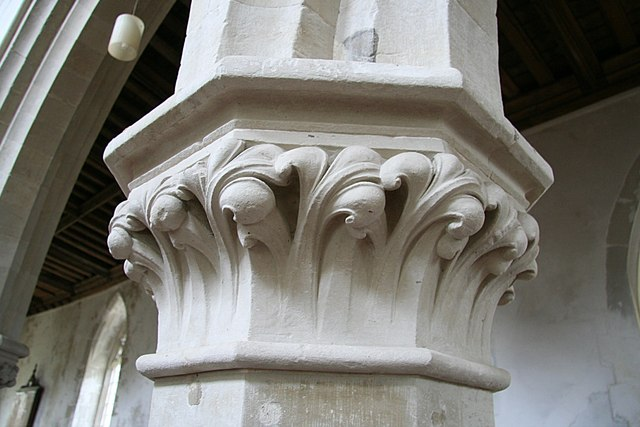
Example of a stiff-leaf capital

Stiff-leaf (also stiff leaf or stiffleaf) is a form of stylised foliage carving used in Early English Gothic architecture in the late 12th and 13th centuries. It evolved out of crocket foliage used in French Early Gothic architecture, and was in turn superseded by naturalistic foliage, which depicted recognisable plant species, in the later 13th century. The basic ornament comprises a thin stem rising to three (or occasionally five) bulbous leaves, generally deeply undercut. Such leaves are grouped on capitals, corbels, vaulting bosses and similar areas where ornament was desired. Stiff-leaf is a form unique to English Gothic architecture, and some of the earliest developed examples can be seen at Wells Cathedral (1170s or '80s). Stiff-leaf could either be bunched in the corners of a capital, in the manner of French-style crockets or volutes, or could spread across it. Variants of stiff-leaf include wind-blown, where the stems are carved in a swaying pattern, and inhabited, where the foliage is combined with people, animals and narrative scenes. The best-known inhabited stiff-leaf is also at Wells, including gurning men (possibly depicting toothache), a scene of fruit-stealers being apprehended and beaten, and a fine lizard. Lincoln Cathedral also has a fine collection of stiff-leaf, from early work in St Hugh's Choir (1190s) to late work in the Angel Choir (1256-80), where it is used in combination with naturalistic foliage, the latest French import. Stiff-leaf was also used in Scotland, which adopted English architectural forms in this period, with the most extensive example being at Glasgow Cathedral. Although it fell out of fashion in the Decorated Gothic period, stiff-leaf was revived in the 19th century as part of the Gothic Revival.

== Gallery ==
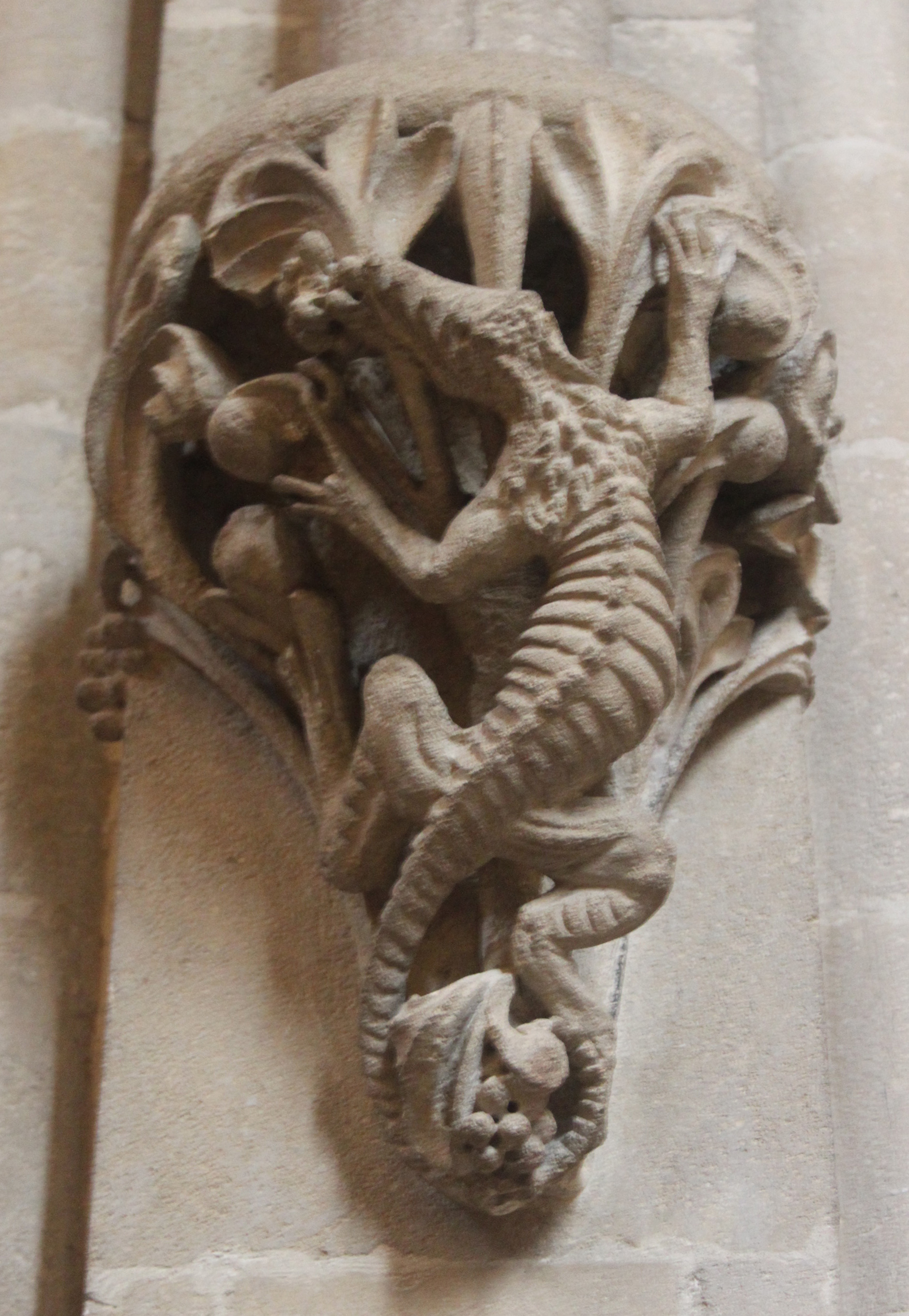
Stiff-leaf corbel inhabited with a lizard, Wells Cathedral

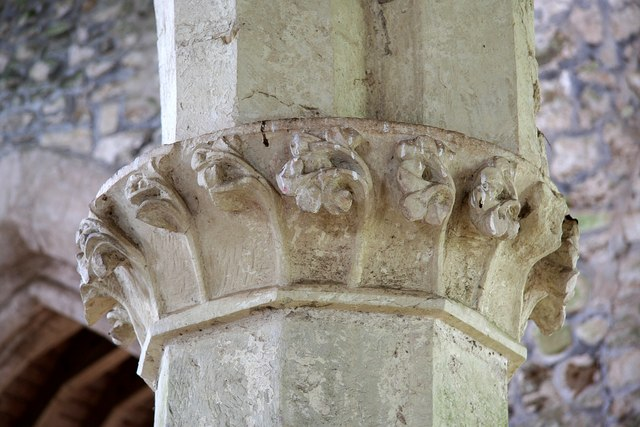
Crude parochial stiff leaf

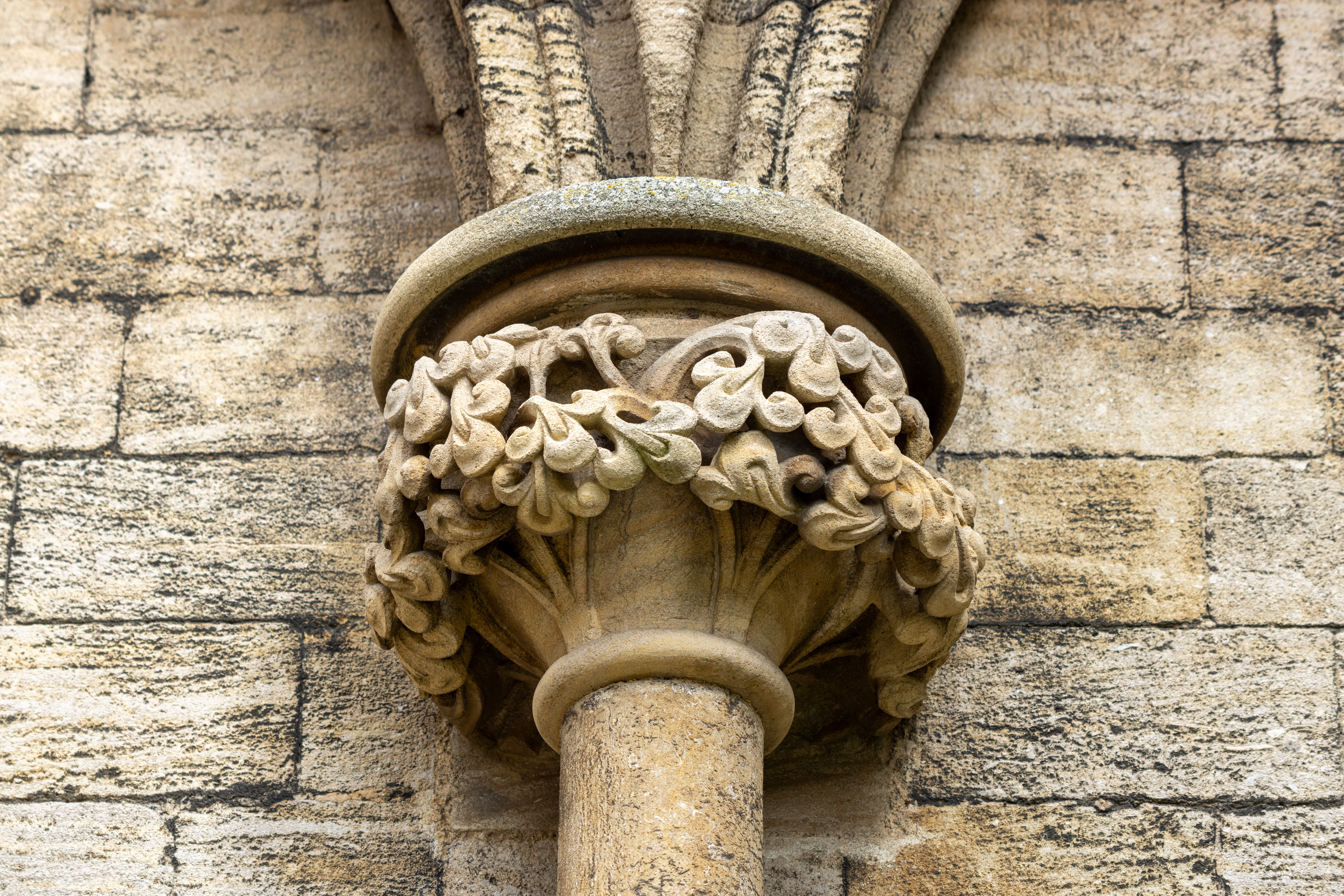
Dense stiff-leaf at Ely Cathedral

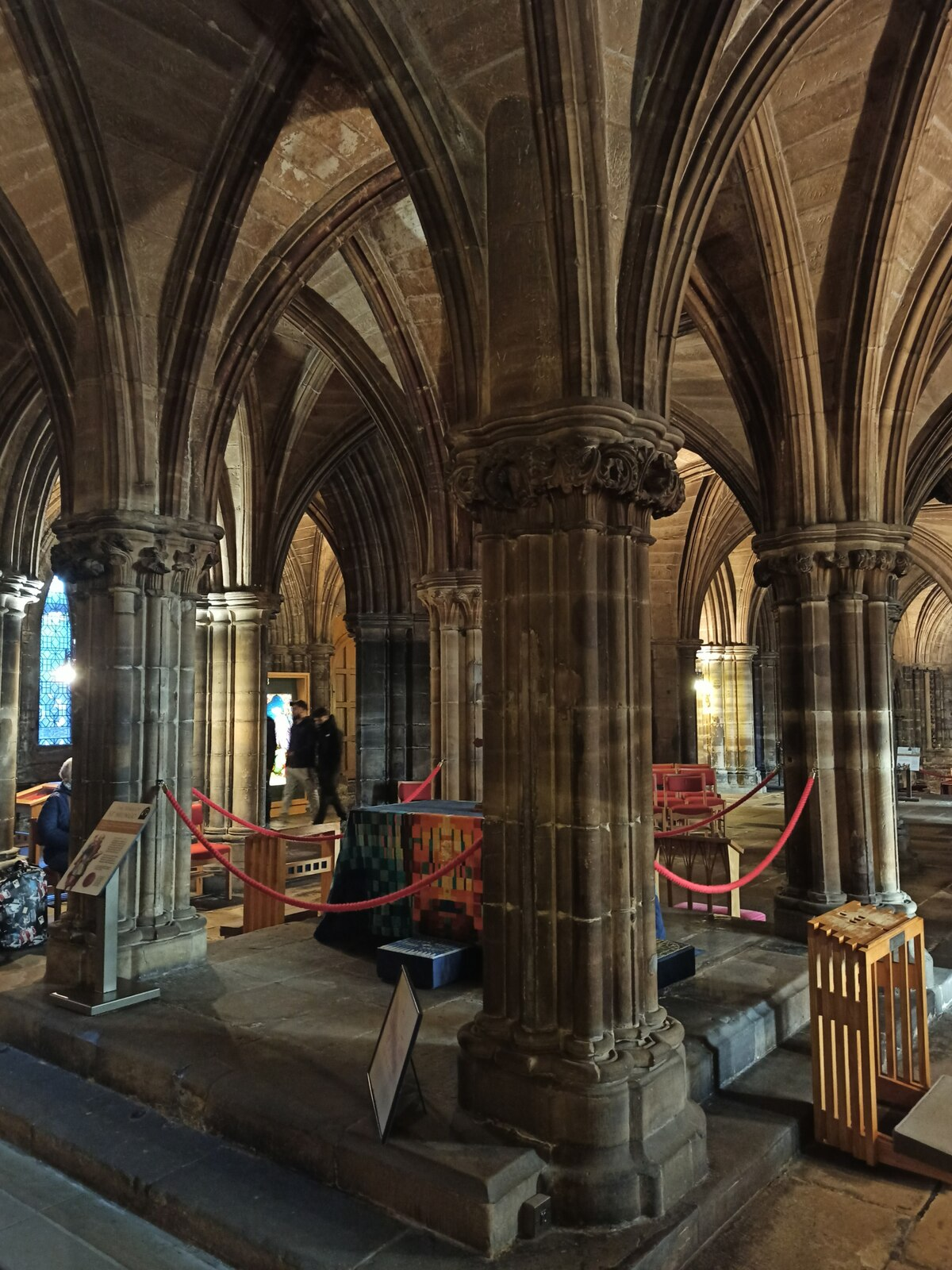
Stiff-leaf capitals used to emphasise the site of St Mungo's tomb, Glasgow Cathedral crypt

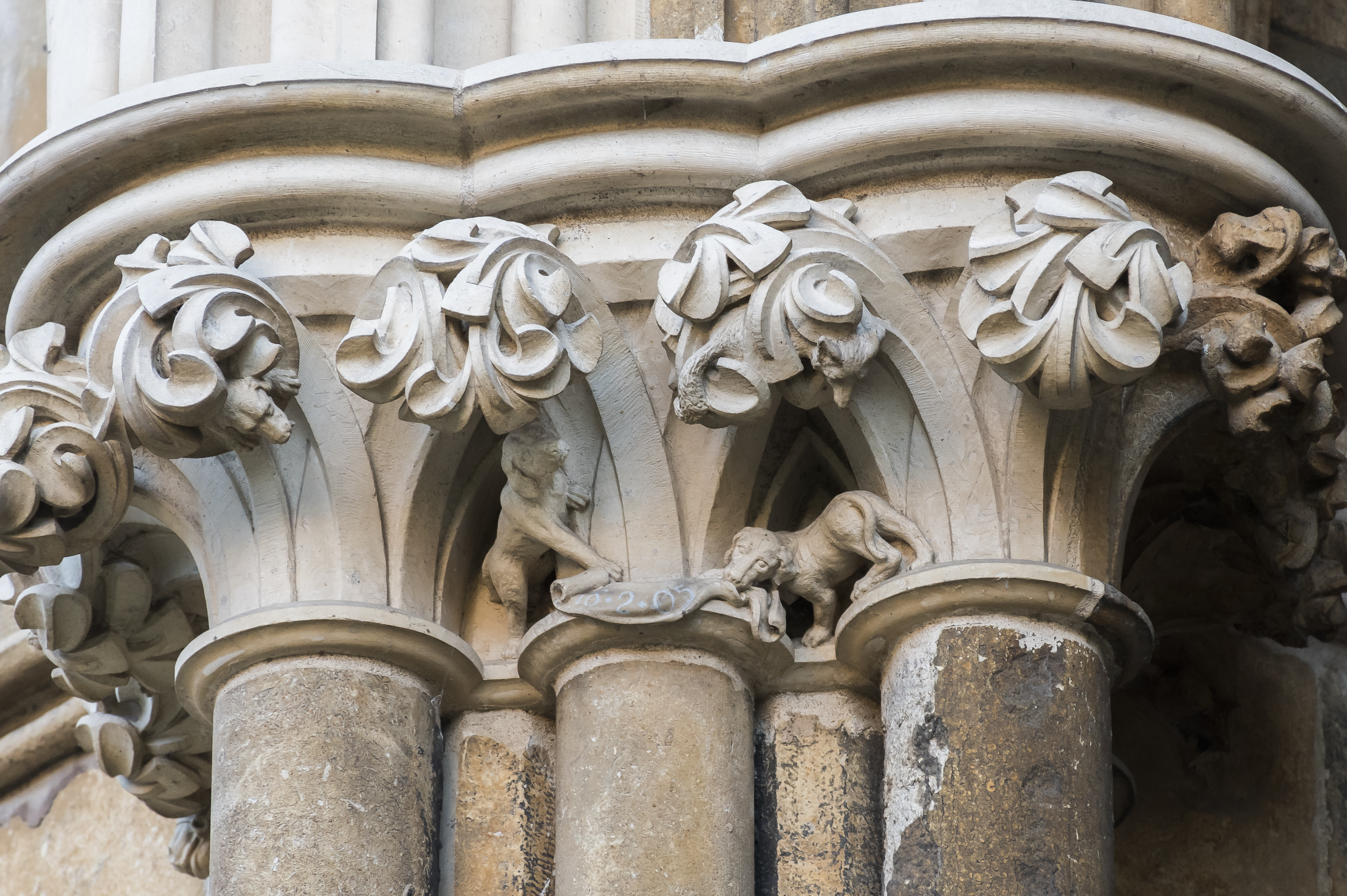
Bunched stiff-leaf, Lincoln Cathedral

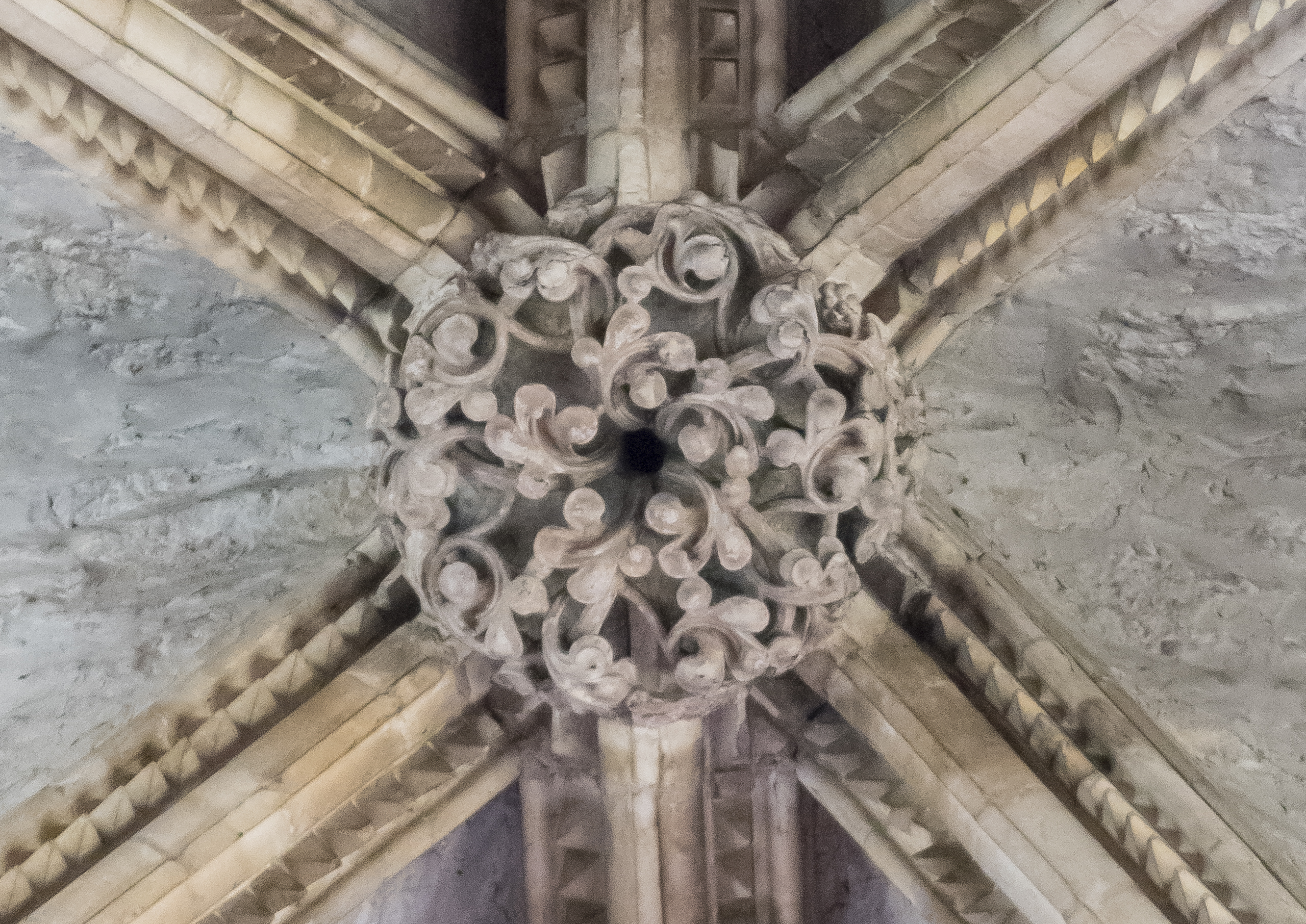
Stiff-leaf vaulting boss, Lincoln Cathedral

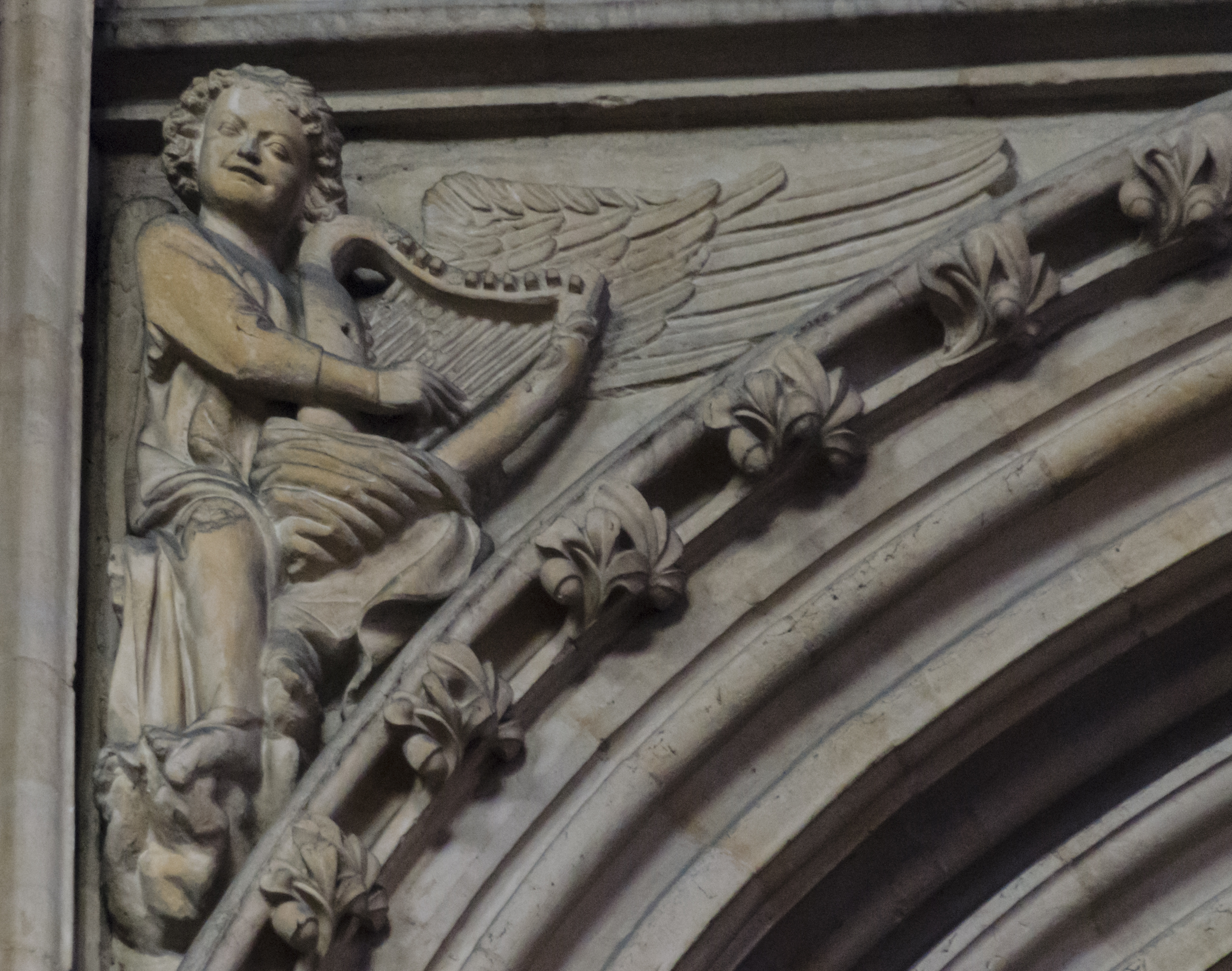
Stiff-leaf crockets decorating an arch, Lincoln Cathedral Angel Choir

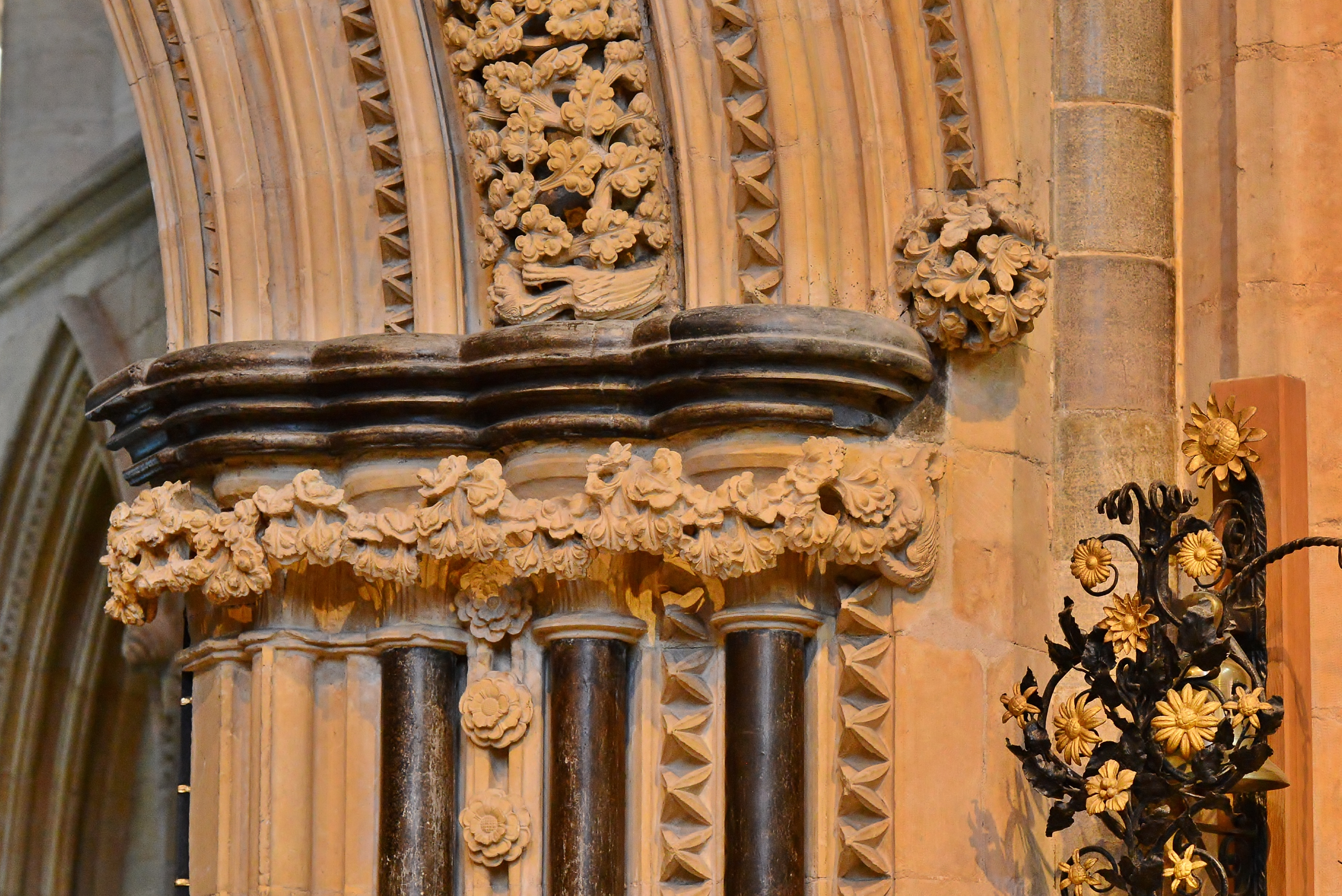
Late stiff-leaf, Lincoln Cathedral
