= Parish Centre of Worship =

A Parish Centre of Worship is a church or other building licensed as such by the diocesan bishop in the Church of England, usually where there is no parish church. For most purposes it is deemed to be a parish church but it is dedicated, not consecrated, and parishioners have a right to be married in any neighbouring parish.
