= Alan Harverson =

Alan Harverson (Alan Hooper) (16 August 1922 – 31 January 2006) was an English organist, pianist and teacher, born and raised in southern Ireland.

He won a scholarship to the Royal Academy of Music in 1939, taking six prizes for piano and organ playing and the coveted Certificate of Merit. He was eventually elected to a professorship in 1973 after having taught there since 1942. He was an organist at number of London churches in succession, including St Mary's Bryanston Square and the London Oratory. He was appointed to the influential churches of St Gabriels, Cricklewood and the Servite Priory, Fulham, where he presided over a new instrument by Grant, Degens & Bradbeer. It is typical of him that, having been appointed, he refused to take up the position in Fulham until the new organ had been completed. Latterly, he was one of the organists at Holy Trinity Sloane Street, where his colourfully expansive playing could be heard in central London each week in the years after 1987.

He found a permanent niche as organist to the BBC Symphony Orchestra and consequently played the organ for twenty-nine Last Nights of the Proms. Alan Harverson worked with many of the leading orchestras and conductors of his time and was a valued chamber musician.

His organ recital work enabled him to tour Europe. He honed his interpretation of leading Baroque composers in the Netherlands in a series of visits as a young man. Harverson conducted his own original research into the styles of organ construction, using instruments dating from the seventeenth and eighteenth centuries. Consequently, he is a pioneer of Baroque performance revival in modern English organ playing.
