= W. D. Harverson =

Walter Douglas Harverson OBE ARSM MIMM (1903 – 1992) was Commissioner of Mines and Geology in Kenya from 1949 to 1958 and Commissioner of Mines in Tanganyika between 1958 and 1962.

== Life ==
Walter Douglas Harverson was born in Wellington, New Zealand in 1903 and educated at Wellington College in New Zealand, Bedford Modern School in England and at the Royal School of Mines in London, England.

In 1934, Harverson was engaged as a geologist in Kenya where he made safaris through the South Kitui District and made notes on the rocks forming the road east of the road at Mutomo and on the marble at Kanziku. He served in World War II between 1939 and 1943 in the East African Engineers when he left as Major.

After World War II Harverson returned to Kenya where, as Assistant Commissioner of Mines, he doubted the ability to exploit limestone deposits at Keben, South of Lessos. He became Commissioner of Mines and Geology for Kenya from 1949 until 1958 when he was appointed Commissioner of Mines in Tanganyika, a position he held until 1962. He was later appointed mining legislation adviser in Liberia in 1967.

Harverson was invested as an Officer of the Order of the British Empire in 1958. He died in 1992.
