= Christians Against Poverty =

UK charitable organisation

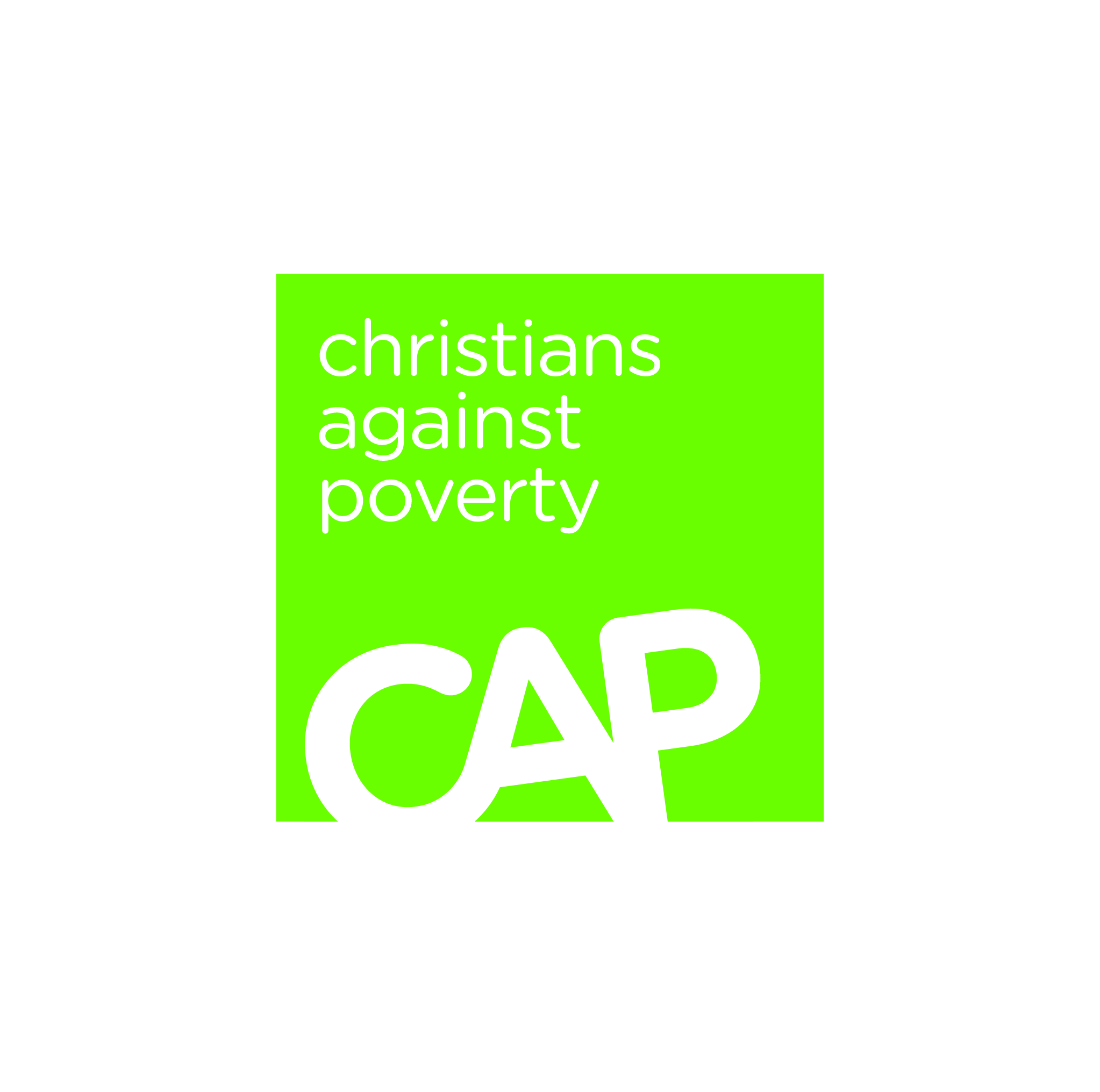
- Founded: 1996
- Founder: John Kirkby
- Type: Christian Charity
- Purpose: Debt counselling
- Origins: United Kingdom
- Website: capuk.org

Christians Against Poverty (CAP) is a Christian charitable company in the United Kingdom founded in Bradford, West Yorkshire by John Kirkby in 1996. It is a national organisation specialising in debt counselling for people in financial difficulty. It also provides job clubs for those seeking employment, life skills groups to help people live well on a low income, and money coaching workshops to equip people with essential budgeting skills.

In December 2011, Christians Against Poverty were granted their own Group Licence by the Office of Fair Trading alongside other leading debt counselling bodies, such as Citizens Advice and Advice UK. The Financial Conduct Authority, which replaced the Office of Fair Trading in 2014, gave Christians Against Poverty full authorisation in 2017. Stewart McCulloch is the current Chief Executive Officer, and joined CAP in January 2024.

In March 2026, CAP announced that it was coming alongside the charity Community Money Advice (CMA) under the umbrella of a newly formed CAP Group. This forms the UK’s largest specialist community-based debt advice charity. The CAP Group offers free, regulated and compassionate debt advice through an expansive network of 380 dedicated centres hosted in local churches and community organisations across the UK. Both remain as their own independent charity, led by CAP Group CEO, Stewart McCulloch.

CAP also has independently operated affiliates in Australia, New Zealand, Canada, and the United States.

== Services ==
Christians Against Poverty offers several different services. Since the organisation was founded in 1996, it has been best known for offering free FCA-authorised debt help. The organisation works through a network of thousands of local churches across the UK. This regional model means that people are offered holistic support from local debt coaches in their community, alongside the central debt advice in the Bradford support hub. Individuals seeking the debt help from CAP give authority to the charity to negotiate with creditors, and CAP will then organise the individual's finances with the goal of making them debt free. CAP's debt advisors based in the Bradford support hub create a personal budget for clients, prioritising basic living needs and offering creditors fair and affordable pro-rata payments whenever possible.

CAP’s debt advisors will also work with their clients to explore the different routes out of debt, helping clients understand all their options – examples include Debt Management Plans, Debt Relief Orders, Bankruptcy and more – and find the best route to become debt free for their circumstances.

In 2013, CAP launched job clubs, a service targeted at people looking for employment, giving them the tools to find work such as CV writing and interview skills. In 2015, CAP launched life skills groups, teaching practical skills to survive life on a low income.

CAP also runs money coaching workshops, previously known as the 'CAP Money Course' to teach budgeting skills, knowledge on using credit wisely and navigating debt. Money coaching participants also get access to free online budgeting tools.

In 2024, CAP created free budgeting resources for kids and youth to help teach children money management skills.

== Policy work ==
As well as providing debt advice and money coaching services, CAP’s Policy and Research team gathers evidence and research, undertakes consultations and publishes reports to help decision-makers develop and shape policy. The team also campaigns and petitions, attends events and roundtables, and advocates for people in debt and on low incomes. CAP advocates for structural changes to legislation, impacting on the quality of life of those living on a low income.

In February 2026, CAP published its latest 'Barriers to Work' report, highlighting how factors such as mental health issues, a lack of accessible training, and the rising cost of living are making it increasingly difficult for vulnerable individuals to secure and maintain stable work.

== Impact ==
In 2026, CAP is celebrating its 30th anniversary since it was founded in 1996. Based on available records, CAP estimates that between 1996 and 2026:

- Over 35,000 people have become debt free.
- Church teams working in partnership with CAP have visited around 100,000 homes for the first time.
- Around 80,000 people have received expert debt advice.
- More than 4,000 churches have partnered with CAP to deliver help in their community.
- More than 100,000 people have taken part in a money coaching session.

== Recognition ==
The charity has won a number of awards, including "Debt Advice Provider of the Year" at the 2015 Collections and Customer Service Awards, the "Martin Williams Award for Contribution to the Credit Industry" at the 2014 Credit Today Awards, as well as Charity Times Awards' "Best Charity to Work For" in 2006 and 2007. CAP came top in "the UK's Best Small Company to Work For" in the Sunday Times' Best Companies list on its debut in 2008, and topped the list again in 2009. CAP's founder, John Kirkby, received a CBE in 2018 for his services.

In October 2018, CAP was featured in the BBC Two documentary The Debt Saviours.

== Funding ==
CAP is funded by donations from individuals, churches, charities and trusts. CAP also operates a Fair Share scheme, whereby banks and other financial organisations donate to CAP an average of 10% of the value of repayments made to them by CAP clients.

== Mission and values ==
CAP mission is to equip local churches, so that when someone who needs face-to-face help is in financial crisis or vulnerability, there will be a church in their community available to help them. CAP operates under five core values:

Their values include:

- Christ-centred. CAP’s work is guided by Christian teachings and includes sharing the gospel alongside its services.
- Collaborative. CAP emphasises working in partnership with the UK Church and other groups of people to deliver its services.
- Compassionate. CAP defines this as a drive for ‘justice and mercy’ while providing empathy and care for clients and supporters.
- Joyful. CAP describes this value as maintaining a focus on ‘God's goodness’ even when dealing with the challenging circumstances of poverty.
- Bold. This involves advocating for structural changes to poverty-related legislation (described as ‘speaking truth to power’) and offering prayer to those they serve.

== International ==
CAP expanded into Australia in 2000, New Zealand in 2008, and Canada in 2013. CAP America, based in the Chicago area, was launched in 2019. The international affiliates are each separate and independent charities, but work on the same principles. In March 2026, CAP Australia rebranded as Hope Economy.
