= Benjaman Kyle =

American man claiming to have severe amnesia (born 1948)

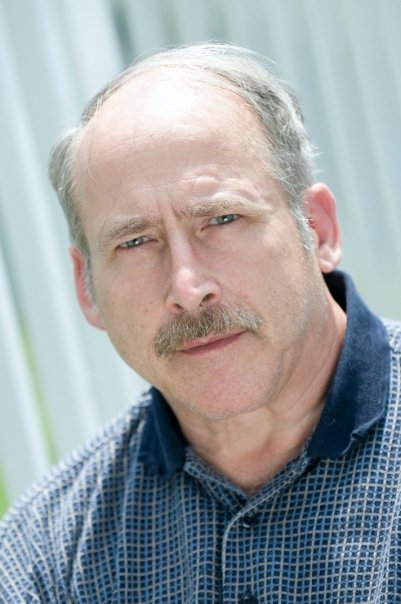
- Kyle in 2010
- Born: William Burgess Powell; August 29, 1948 (age 78); Lafayette, Indiana, U.S.
- Known for: Alleged Identity loss due to dissociative amnesia (Disputed claim)

Benjaman Kyle is the alias chosen by William Burgess Powell (born August 29, 1948), an American man who has claimed to have severe amnesia.

On August 31, 2004, he was found naked, wounded, and without any possessions, next to a dumpster behind a Burger King restaurant in Richmond Hill, Georgia. Between 2004 and 2015, his real identity was unknown despite an intensive search that included television publicity and various other methods. In late 2015, genetic detective work led to the discovery of his identity as Powell. With the rediscovery of his Social Security number, he again became eligible for employment and has received public assistance.

== Early life ==
William Burgess Powell was born August 29, 1948. He has claimed to remember things placing him in Indianapolis between around 1954 and 1963. He grew up in Indiana and worked at Purdue University as a janitor.

Powell also has memories of being in the Denver Metropolitan Area. He had detailed memories of the subscription the University of Colorado Boulder's Norlin Library had to Restaurants & Institutions. He also remembered the Round the Corner Restaurant on The Hill, and the Flatirons and The Fox Theater near the Boulder campus. This placed Powell in Colorado in the late 1970s to early 1980s. Powell reported having memories of the controversy surrounding the construction of mass transit in Denver, at a time when the city still had no financing to proceed. Although the RTD Bus & Light Rail system in Denver went into operation in 1994, public debate over the construction of the system dates back to about 1980, consistent with the time period of the other memories that Powell has of Denver and Boulder. More specific memories of Boulder suggested Powell to have been there between 1976 and 1983.

== Incident and post-amnesia ==
On August 31, 2004, at 5:00 a.m., a Burger King employee in Richmond Hill, Georgia, found Powell unconscious, naked, and sunburned behind a dumpster of the restaurant. Employees called emergency services, who took him to St. Joseph's/Candler Hospital in Savannah. He had no identity document and was recorded in hospital records as "Burger King Doe" or "B.K. Doe." There were no reports of stolen vehicles in the area, and local restaurants and hotels had not encountered any individuals matching Powell's description. Two weeks later, he was transferred to Memorial Health University Medical Center, where records state he was semiconscious.

He eventually said that he remembered his name was "Benjaman" – spelled unusually – but said he could not recall his last name. He chose the surname "Kyle" based on his placeholder initials "B.K." He had cataracts in both eyes, and had corrective surgery nine months after he was found, when a charity raised enough money to pay for the operation. Upon seeing himself clearly in the mirror for the first time, Kyle claimed to realize that he was around 20 years older than he had thought he was.

Kyle said that he believed that he had been passing through Richmond Hill, either on U.S. Route 17 or Interstate 95, in late August 2004. If so, he may also have been on the road because of Hurricane Charley, which had hit earlier that month.

After being released from the hospital, Kyle spent several years between the Grace House men's shelter and hospitals. In 2007, while at The J.C. Lewis Health Care Center, he met a nurse who inquired about his past. The nurse helped support Powell financially, while he earned money mowing the lawns of neighbors. He was diagnosed with dissociative amnesia in 2007 by Atlanta psychologist Jason A. King. Georgia Legal Services was unable to obtain Powell's medical records, as Memorial Health requested an $800 fee. A friend contacted Georgia Congressman Jack Kingston for help with the case. To help with Kyle's identification, Kingston's office sent DNA samples to the FBI's National Criminal Justice Information Services Division in West Virginia.

In March 2011, Kyle was approached by Florida State University's College of Motion Picture Arts graduate student John Wikstrom. Kyle moved to Jacksonville, Florida, traveling on foot, in order to be filmed for a documentary. In 2011, with help from Florida State Representative Mike Weinstein, Kyle obtained a legal, government-issued Florida Legacy ID. Kyle's story appeared in a report on News4Jax, which caught the attention of a local restaurateur, who subsequently employed Kyle as a dishwasher. As of January 2015, he lived in Jacksonville Beach, Florida, in a 5-by-8-foot, air-conditioned shack provided by a benefactor.

For many years after his purported amnesia, Kyle was homeless; further, he had been unable to obtain employment as he could not remember his full Social Security number. Several online petitions were created asking lawmakers to grant Kyle a new Social Security number. In 2012, an online petition was created on the We the People petitioning system on whitehouse.gov, but when its deadline expired on December 25, it had received only two-thirds of the number of signatures required to receive an official response. In February 2015, forensic genealogist Colleen Fitzpatrick reported that Kyle had cut off all contact with her just as she felt she was nearing a breakthrough. A DNA test revealed that Kyle shared significant amount of DNA with members of a family named Powell in the western Carolinas – descendants of a 19th-century man named Abraham Lovely Powell.

== Identification ==
On September 16, 2015, Kyle announced on his Facebook page that his identity had been established by a team of adoption researchers led by CeCe Moore.

The Orlando Sentinel reported on September 22 that Kyle had received a Florida identification card with the help of IDignity, an Orlando-based organization that helps the homeless and others obtain identification documents. IDignity also assisted in establishing Kyle's identification.

On November 21, 2016, Benjaman Kyle's true identity was revealed to be William Burgess Powell. He was born on August 29, 1948, in Lafayette, Indiana, and was raised there. In 1976, he had cut ties with his family and abandoned his possessions including his car and the trailer where he had been living. His family filed a missing persons report at the time, and police found he had moved to Boulder, Colorado, on a whim with a coworker. His birth date turned out to be one of the details about his previous life that he had related correctly. A reporter found some Social Security records of him working in various jobs until 1983, after which no records could be found for the remaining period of more than 20 years before his discovery in 2004.

== Media coverage ==
Kyle appeared on the Dr. Phil show on the October 16, 2008, episode "Who am I". Dr. Phil McGraw paid for Kyle to seek a professional hypnotist in an effort to help him recover lost memories. Kyle also appeared on local television networks across the country. He says he has been met with skepticism about the case.

The news of Kyle's identification received widespread coverage, including stories by the Orlando Sentinel, ABC News and New York's Daily News.

In 2026, his story was covered in the docuseries The Many Lives of Benjaman Kyle, which alleged his amnesia was faked to escape past ties to organized crime. Carla Hay of Culture Mix criticized the docuseries' tabloid-like quality, finding that most of its story "consists of second-hand gossip that hasn't been proven, [and] vague and contradictory interviews".

== See also ==
- List of solved missing person cases (2000s)
- Anthelme Mangin
- Elba Soccarras, formerly unidentified woman found in 1994
