= Arthur Charles Rothery Nutt =

British Army officer

Lieutenant-Colonel Arthur Charles Rothery Nutt DSO
- Born: 19 March 1873; Kensington, London
- Died: 21 June 1946 (aged 73); Parkstone, Dorset
- Military career
- Allegiance: United Kingdom
- Branch: British Army
- Rank: Lieutenant-Colonel
- Commands: 52nd Battery, Royal Field Artillery, Royal Artillery; 43rd (Wessex) Infantry Division
- Conflicts: North-West Frontier; First World War
- Awards: Distinguished Service Order; Mentioned in Despatches

Lieutenant-Colonel Arthur Charles Rothery Nutt DSO (19 March 1873 – 21 June 1946) was an officer in the Royal Artillery who invented the artillery miniature range.

== Early life ==
Nutt was born in London in 1873, the son of William Henry Rothery Nutt, an official of the Bank of England, and his wife Kathleen Laura (née Bloxham). He was educated at Bedford Modern School and the Royal Military Academy, Woolwich, being commissioned as a second lieutenant on 16 March 1893.

== Military service ==
Nutt served on the North-West Frontier of India 1897–98 (medal with two clasps for the Punjab Frontier and the Tirah Campaign).

During World War I, then Major Nutt was the Officer Commanding 52nd Battery, Royal Field Artillery. At the Battle of Le Cateau it was reported that 'The Officer in the OP of 52 Battery (Major Nutt) was still controlling the fire of his battery although shot through the throat; he was only able to whisper his fire orders. His battery by the end of the day achieved the highest expenditure of ammunition in the whole division, at 183 rounds per gun, a remarkable feet of resupply'. In his book, 'Challenge of Battle:the real story of the British Army in 1914', Adrian Gilbert states that 'A suggestion that the battery should retire was categorically rebuffed'. Nutt was taken as a prisoner of war on 27 August 1914, was moved into internment in Switzerland on 27 December 1917 eventually repatriated on 23 December 1918. Nutt was mentioned in despatches and made a Companion of the Distinguished Service Order.

== Artillery miniature range ==
Nutt invented his artillery range as a prisoner of war '..whose whirring and complicated machinery reproduced exactly the result of the fire orders given in the form of tiny puffs of cigarette smoke or shrapnel air-bursts of cotton wool let down on strings'. It is known that a Nutt Range was installed at Okehampton Artillery Camp.

== Military life after World War I ==
Nutt later commanded the Royal Artillery, 43rd (Wessex) Infantry Division (Territorial Army).

== Family life ==
In 1896 Nutt married Constance Helen Burness. They had two children. He married secondly, Isabel, the widow at the time of his death in Parkstone, Dorset on 21 June 1946.
