= Artillery miniature range =

The artillery miniature range or Nutt range was invented by Lieutenant-Colonel Arthur Charles Rothery Nutt DSO as a method of training for the Royal Artillery. Nutt invented his range as a prisoner of war. In his book, History of the Royal Regiment of Artillery:Between the wars, 1919–39, Sir Martin Farndale writes about the Nutt Range '..whose whirring and complicated machinery reproduced exactly the result of the fire orders given in the form of tiny puffs of cigarette smoke or shrapnel air-bursts of cotton wool let down on strings’.

It is known that a Nutt Range was installed at Okehampton Artillery Camp, but was removed some time between 1924 and 1933. Okehampton also had a similar Newton range, housed in a building 16 by 60 feet (4.9 m × 18.3 m), demolished in 1939.
