= Antecedent (genealogy) =

Concept in genealogy

In genealogy and in phylogenetic studies of evolutionary biology, antecedents or antecessors are predecessors in a family line. For example, one is the descendant of their grandparents, who are one's antecedents. This term has particular utility in evolutionary coalescent theory, which models the process of genetic drift in reverse time.

The antonym of antecedent is descendant.

== In culture ==
An adoption detective is any licensed or unlicensed person who looks into historic records to locate persons of interest. Clients are children suffering from genealogical bewilderment with a desire to learn something about their genetic antecedents by tracing family lineages to become enlightened about their ancestral social and cultural heritage; discover the geographical niche from which their ancestral population originated; and meet biological descendants.
