= Elba Soccarras =

Formerly unidentified woman

The case of Elba Soccarras, unidentified woman in Woodbridge
- Date: November 4, 1994
- Duration: 14 years
- Venue: Woodbridge Center
- Location: Woodbridge Township, New Jersey
- Motive: Suspected adult abandonment by a relative
- Outcome: Identified in March 2009

Elba Leonor Diaz Soccarras (born March 28, 1934) is a Colombian-born American amnesiac whose origins and identity were unknown to New Jersey authorities for 14 years from 1994 to 2009. Suffering from advanced Alzheimer's disease, Soccarras was unable to disclose information on her identity after she was abandoned at a New Jersey shopping mall.

== Background ==
=== Discovery ===
On November 4, 1994, Soccarras was found at the Woodbridge Center in Woodbridge Township, New Jersey. She spoke Spanish, had no memory of her identity, and did not carry any identification. She was well groomed and wearing an engraved wedding ring. She was unable to speak. She recalled her name as "Elba."

Elba was placed in the Garrett Hagedorn Psychiatric Hospital in Hunterdon County, New Jersey where she was diagnosed with Alzheimer's disease.

In 2008, New Jersey officials renewed a canvassing campaign across the state, as well as in Colombia and Venezuela, in an effort to discover her true identity. At the time, officials believed that she had been abandoned by a family member.

=== Identification ===
In March 2009, through tips from the public and aid from the Colombian consulate, authorities were able to identify her as 74-year-old Elba Leonor Diaz Soccarras, who had immigrated from Colombia to the United States in 1969. She was born on March 28, 1934, in Villanueva, La Guajira. As a single mother, she had worked for years in a factory. Officials learned that she had a daughter living in New Jersey the entire time she was unidentified. The daughter said they had a disagreement and she had thought that Elba had returned to Colombia years ago. By establishing her citizenship, authorities were able to transfer her from Garrett Hagedorn Psychiatric Hospital to a nursing home.

== See also ==
- Anthelme Mangin
- Benjaman Kyle
- List of solved missing person cases: 1950–1969
- Unidentified decedent
