= Adoption detective =

An adoption detective is an individual who researches biological and genetic connections between individuals. They conduct searches of public and private records, research historical documents, and interview persons of interest for the purpose of uncovering genealogical information linking biologically related individuals, persons related by marriage, foster parents, or other key contacts. Informally, a detective is any licensed or unlicensed person who solves crimes, including historical crimes, or looks into records. Also known as private investigators, police detectives must pass written tests after completion of the requirements for being a police officer.

== Investigations ==
Investigations conducted by adoption detectives have potential to result in lengthy arduous or convoluted worldwide investigations across international borders and geographic regions. They may create unexpected adventures reminiscent of classic mystery novels leading to the discovery of previously hidden information, sometimes leading in directions not originally anticipated, or what the genealogist, detective, mystery writer, or client originally had in mind. Exposure of information intentionally concealed may lead to unintended consequences or produce negative emotional outcomes. Adoption detectives need to retain a perspicacious mind to master the elegant art of detection, and remain ever vigilant to the potential for psychological trauma that may be caused by exposing unwilling individuals. This type of information is often difficult to obtain, especially in cases where birth certificates and baptismal certificates were intentionally falsified; legal documents are filed as concealed records not readily available to the public without a search warrant; or when persons of interest are deceased, uncooperative, or desire not to be found.

== Clients ==
The majority of clients are children who were orphaned, fostered, or adopted seeking to learn about, contact even reunite with their biological relatives. Others include parents separated from their biological children; doctors benefiting from family medical histories; attorneys dealing with inheritance or other legal matters; police detectives researching crimes, requesting DNA, or other confidential personal information; historians, genealogists, and social researchers; and other individuals requesting information about ancestral antecedents. Children who suffer from genealogical bewilderment have an inherent desire to learn something about their biological antecedents. They possess a desire to trace their family lineage to be enlightened about their ancestral social and cultural heritage, meet biological parents, and discover the geographical niche from which their ancestral population originated. Knowing that the birth parents discarded the child leaves many adoptees feeling psychologically disturbed, anonymous, and unheralded. The absence of ancestral information is often an unsolvable mystery for many because they do not possess the skills or knowledge needed to produce a positive outcome. These individuals may benefit from the assistance of an adoption detective, or the professional skills and advice of a qualified private investigator.

== Medical family history ==
To help focus attention on the importance of medical family history, the Surgeon General, in cooperation with other agencies with the U.S. Department of Health and Human Services, has launched a national public health campaign, called the Surgeon General's Family History Initiative, to encourage all American families to learn more about their family health history. The fact that all living things inherit traits from their parents is information that has been used since prehistoric times to improve crop plants and animals through selective breeding. The biological science of genetics, which began with the work of Gregor Mendel in the mid-nineteenth century, seeks to understand the process of inheritance and the physical basis for heredity in our DNA.

What is known about human traits inherited through patients' families can save their lives—that is why gathering a person's complete and accurate medical family history is extremely important even as genetic medicine continues to explain more diseases. Many advances in biological medical science are anticipated in the future now that the human genome has been discovered.

Despite the increasing emphasis on diagnostic technology, many physicians perceive the medical family history as the preeminent source of information with a much higher value in diagnosis than either the physical examination or laboratory and radiography information because it is well known that many medical conditions, including heart disease, breast cancer, prostate cancer, diabetes, alcoholism, Huntington's disease, Alzheimer's disease, hemophilia, cystic fibrosis, sickle cell anemia, and high blood pressure all have been shown to have links to our past.

Children who are orphaned, fostered or adopted, who do not have access to medical records because their parents are unknown, deceased or uncooperative, may benefit from the comprehensive investigative skills of an adoption detective. The profession's skill set can uncover medical information recorded in death certificates, obituaries, interviews, DNA, genealogy and ancestor websites, and old family letters. Even old family photos can provide visual clues to diseases such as obesity, skin conditions, and osteoporosis.
