= Lineal descendant =

Blood relative in the direct line of descent

A lineal or direct descendant, in legal usage, is a blood relative in a person's direct line of descent – the children, grandchildren, great-grandchildren, etc. In a legal procedure sense, lineal descent refers to the acquisition of estate by inheritance by parent from grandparent and by child from parent, whereas collateral descent refers to the acquisition of estate or real property by inheritance by sibling from sibling, and cousin from cousin.

Adopted children, for whom adoption statutes create the same rights of heirship as children of the body, come within the meaning of the term "lineal descendants," as used in a statute providing for the non-lapse of a devise where the devisee predeceases the testator but leaves lineal descendants.

Among some Native American tribes in the United States, tribal enrollment can be determined by lineal descent, as opposed to a minimum blood quantum. Lineal descent means that anyone directly descended from original tribal enrollees could be eligible for tribal enrollment, regardless of how much native blood they have.

The antonym of descendant is antecedent.

== Collateral descendant ==
A collateral or indirect descendant is a term for a relative descended from a person's sibling or the sibling of an ancestor, and thus a niece, nephew, aunt, uncle, or cousin, of any order.

== See also ==
- Family tree – Chart representing family relationships
- Genealogy – Study of family lineage and history
- Issue (genealogy) – In genealogy and wills, one's lineal descendants
- Primogeniture – Inheritance by the eldest, usually male, child
- Trust (law) – Three-party fiduciary relationship
- Will contest – Formal objection to the validity of a will
