= World War I prisoners of war in Germany =

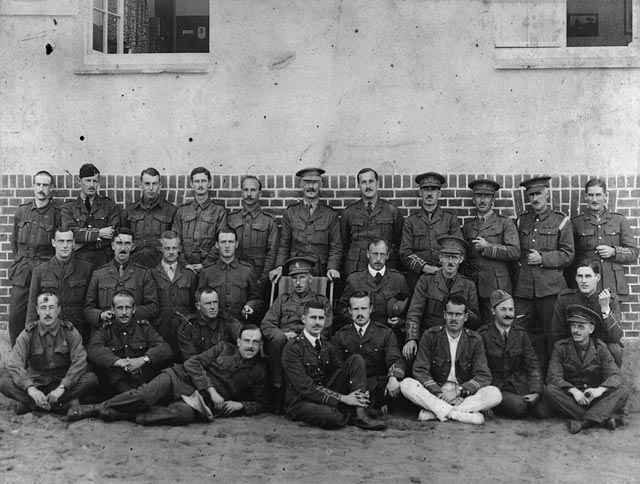
Canadian prisoners of war in Germany in 1917

The situation of Prisoners of war in World War I in Germany is an aspect of the conflict little covered by historical research. However, the number of soldiers imprisoned reached a little over seven million for all the belligerents, of whom around 2,400,000 were held by Germany.

Starting in 1915, the German authorities put in place a system of camps, nearly three hundred in all, and did not hesitate to resort to denutrition, punishments and psychological mobbing; incarceration was also combined with methodical exploitation of the prisoners. This prefigured the systematic use of prison camps on a grand scale during the 20th century.

However, the captivity organised by the German military authorities also contributed to creating exchanges among peoples and led a number of prisoners to reflect on their involvement in the war and relation with their homeland.

== The Hague Conventions ==
At the end of the 19th century, Western nations reflected on the legal aspect of war and of captive soldiers, particularly following the Crimean and Austro-Prussian wars. Tsar Nicholas II initiated the two conferences that fixed the terms of the laws and customs of war at The Hague in 1899 and 1907.

Chapter II of the convention signed in October 1907 is entirely devoted to prisoners of war and begins thus: "Prisoners of war are in the power of the hostile Government, but not of the individuals or corps who capture them. They must be humanely treated. All their personal belongings, except arms, horses, and military papers, remain their property."

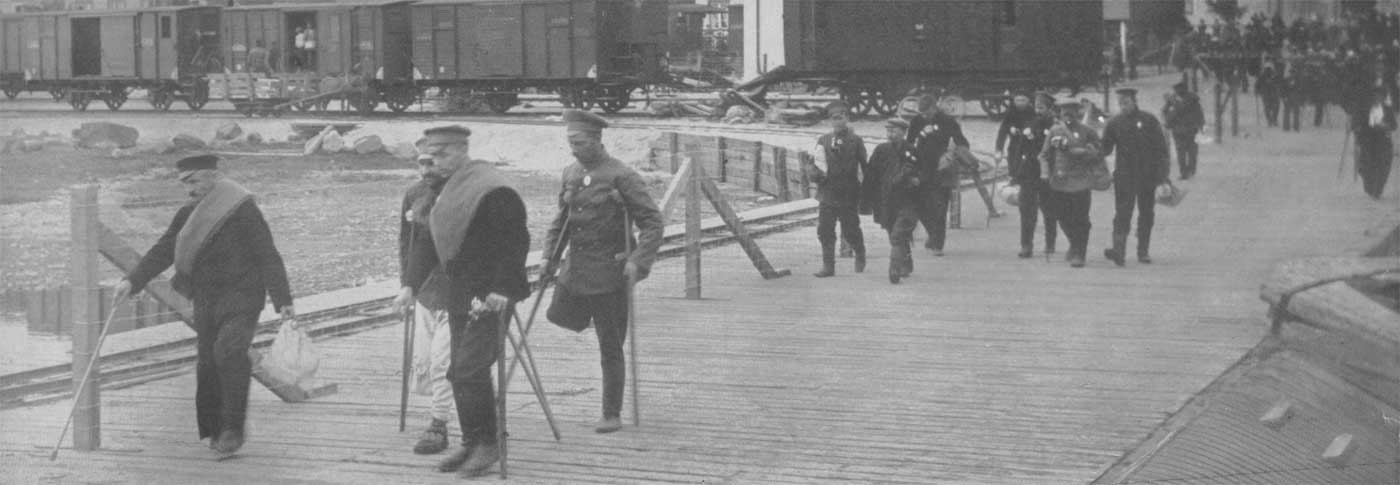
Russian POWs who were wounded for life take part in a 1915 prisoner exchange

The twenty articles comprising this chapter regulate various aspects of life in captivity such as lodging, work, religion, nourishment, dress, and mail. However, this international accord is imbued with 19th-century conceptions of war. Thus, prisoners "may be set at liberty on parole if the laws of their country allow", for example.

The principal nations of the Triple Entente and the Triple Alliance signed the convention, with the exception of the Ottoman Empire, not among the 44 signatories in 1907. The Hague Conventions’ dispositions entered into force in the German Empire and France on 26 January 1910, but these agreements turned out to be unsuitable in the tumult of World War I. In October 1918, the number of prisoners held in Germany reached 2,415,043, and such a mass of men made it harder for a country at war to respect the conventions fully. During the conflict, the belligerent parties concluded special accords in order to mitigate these difficulties and in 1929, a new text was produced, amending the applicable regulatory dispositions.

== Conditions of detention ==
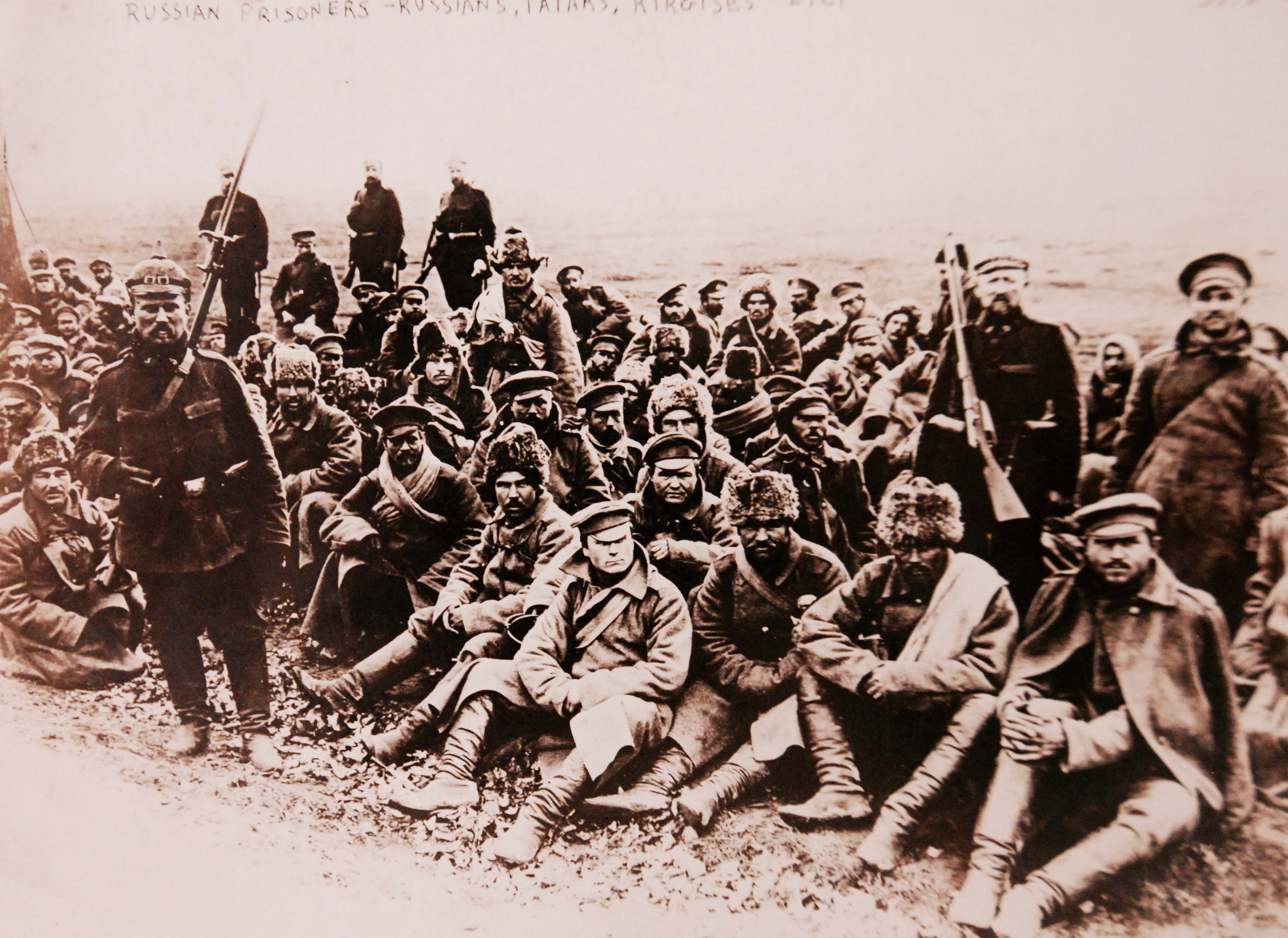
Russian prisoners of war under German guard

From the beginning of the war, the German authorities found themselves confronted with an unexpected influx of prisoners. In September 1914, 125,050 French soldiers and 94,000 Russian soldiers were held captive. Before 1915, conditions of detention in Germany were very harsh and marked by temporary lodging and the absence of infrastructure. The prisoners slept in hangars or tents, where they dug holes to keep warm. The humid forts requisitioned to serve as places of detention led to numerous cases of pulmonary illness. The German authorities also commandeered schools, barns and various other types of shelters. Camps were established in the countryside as well as near the towns, which had consequences when epidemics of cholera or typhus threatened to spread to the civilian population.

Not all the camps were situated on German territory; a certain number were built in occupied territories, notably in northern and eastern France. They began to be developed starting in 1915 when the number of prisoners being held captive in Germany reached 652,000. According to official directives, each prisoner had to have use of 2.5 m^{2}. The camps mixed a large number of nationalities sharing the same quarters: French, Russian, British, American, Canadian, Belgian, Italian, Romanian, Serbian, Montenegrin, Portuguese and Japanese prisoners were found there, as well as Greeks and Brazilians. Equally, soldiers of various social origins rubbed elbows: workers, peasants, bureaucrats and intellectuals were among those held. The number of prisoners rose very quickly. From February to August 1915, it went from 652,000 to 1,045,232. In August 1916, it reached 1,625,000, jumping to 2,415,000 by October 1918.

=== The camps ===
==== The types of camps ====
Map showing the locations of the principal soldiers' camps

===== The Mannschaftslager =====
These were the basic soldiers' camps, made up of wooden barrack huts 10m wide and 50m long, covered with tar on the outside. Each hut held around 250 prisoners. A central corridor provided access on each side to bunk beds, with straw- or sawdust-filled palliasses. Furniture was kept to a minimum, and generally limited to a table, chairs or benches and a stove. The camps also included barracks for guards, a Kantine (cafeteria) where prisoners could sometimes buy small luxuries and supplementary food, a parcels office, a guardhouse, and kitchens. Some camps had additional amenities, including sanitary facilities, or cultural facilities such as a library, a theatre/concert hall, or a space for worship.

All around the camp, there was barbed wire three metres high; the wires were spaced fifteen centimetres apart, a wooden post every three metres, and across other barbed wires every fifty centimetres, forming a mesh.

Prisoners on work details often spent longer or shorter periods of time away from their parent camp: those engaged in agriculture, for example, might be housed in village assembly halls.

===== Officers’ camps (Offizierslager) =====
Map showing the locations of the principal officers' camps

From 1915, imprisoned officers were held in camps reserved for them. By October 1918, the number of officers’ camps had reached 73.

Living conditions for officers were usually less harsh than those endured by troops. The "camps" themselves were usually located in requisitioned buildings (castles, barracks or hotels), rather than in compounds of tents and huts. Officers had a higher allocation of space per man than other ranks, they had beds instead of straw-filled palliasses, specific rooms were fitted out for their meals, and they were exempt from labour. In addition, there were no officers’ camps in East Prussia (see map), where weather conditions were often far worse than in the rest of Germany. One of the main burdens of camp life for officers was tedium. Their daily lives tended to revolve around sport, amateur concerts and plays, lectures, debates, and reading. As the result of an agreement reached in 1916 between the British and German governments, British officers were even allowed to go for walks in groups outside the camp, provided they signed a document giving their word of honour not to attempt escape.

Officers' camps accommodated, in addition to their officer-prisoners, a smaller number of other ranks prisoners known as orderlies, whose role was to act as servants to the officers and to perform menial tasks around the camp. Orderlies appreciated that their situation was safer and more comfortable than that of their counterparts in soldiers' camps, and so, even when offered the opportunity, they generally did not try to escape, knowing that if recaptured they would be sent to far worse conditions.

===== The Durchgangslager =====
The rapid progression of the German offensive in the early part of the war led to a massive influx of prisoners. From 1915, transit camps, the Durchgangslager, were built to manage and redirect this wave toward detention camps. There was a special transit camp for Allied prisoners of war at the former Europäischer Hof at 39, Ettlinger Strasse, in Karlsruhe. This was known as the "Listening Hotel" by the inmates, who recognized that it was a camp devoted to intelligence collection. This "Listening Hotel" was similar in organization and purpose to the Dulag Luft camp at Frankfurt in the Second World War.

===== Reprisal camps =====
These camps were often located in regions where the climate or the terrain made life difficult, but also near the front, where the prisoners might be taken to rebuild trenches or cart away bodies. The goal of the reprisal camps was to put pressure on enemy governments to ameliorate conditions of detention for German prisoners, and to punish prisoners (for instance following an escape). Life for prisoners sent to reprisal camps was so harsh that many of them died. Robert d'Harcourt describes the arrival of a prisoners' convoy coming from such a camp: "These men – these soldiers – marched, but they were dead; beneath each blue greatcoat was the head of a dead man: their eyes hollow, their cheekbones jutting out, their emaciated grimaces those of graveyard skulls". Often kept in tents resting in mud, these prisoners were forced into exhausting work with their entire diet consisting of soup or perhaps stewed acorns. At certain camps, for instance at Sedan, some prisoners were executed. Reprisal camps for officers existed, too: the fortress at Ingolstadt held Charles de Gaulle, Georges Catroux, Roland Garros, the journalist and World War II Resistance member Rémy Roure, the editor Berger-Levrault and the future Soviet Marshal Mikhail Tukhachevsky.

==== Guard personnel ====
The camp guard personnel were divided into two categories: the officers and sub-officers who directed the camps, and the sentinels who kept watch. This division was also found in the perception the prisoners had for these people, the second group receiving greater sympathy or indulgence. A German adjutant was responsible for prisoners' companies and was tasked with all the administrative measures.

These German officers were most often unsuited for combat and were thus posted to the camps. In effect, they were either too old: "Saw the general commanding the camp: old fogey with black red-striped pants […] and a big iron cross, he limps" or unfit due to alcoholism or war wounds. Starting with the camp director, a very strict hierarchy was in place. The director gave orders to the sub-officers, who were often young. The prisoners dreaded the latter: "Finally the fourth German corporal, the youngest, Red Baby, a worthy student who did honour to Savage and Steel Mouth, only sought to do harm, always provoking, having several acts of savagery to his name." For their part, the prisoners had fun giving them nicknames such as Gueule d’Acier ("Steel Mouth" – lit. "Stainless Steel Trap"), Jambes de laine ("Woolen Legs"), Je sais tout ("Know-it-all" – lit. "I know everything"), Rabiot des tripes ("Tripe leftovers"), or even La Galoche ("The Clog") and Sourire d’Avril ("April Smile").

"The deliberate ferocity, when we had to endure it, was above all displayed among the ruling class, the officers, the administrators, and most particularly it came to us through ministerial orders drawn up in Berlin." The guards seem not to have been judged in the same manner as the officers, hated for their zeal. Most often, they were part of the territorial army, the Landsturm, and tended to be family fathers who were there only under obligation. Numerous accounts are found regarding their occasional benevolence.

=== Food ===
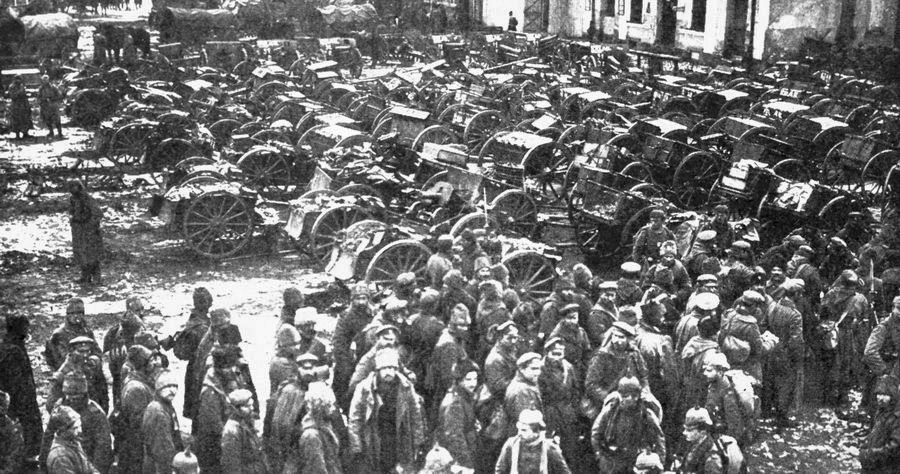
Russian prisoners during the Battle of Tannenberg

According to the Second Hague Convention, "The Government into whose hands prisoners of war have fallen is charged with their maintenance. In the absence of a special agreement between the belligerents, prisoners of war shall be treated as regards board, lodging, and clothing on the same footing as the troops of the Government who captured them." Nevertheless, prisoners frequently suffered from hunger.

As a general rule, breakfast was served between 6:00 and 7:30 am, lunch around 11:00 am and dinner at about 6:30 pm.[32] From the start of their captivity, the food posed a problem for prisoners, who complained of a diet that was too inconsistent to ward off hunger. Soup became the symbol of this regimen: it might be made with beans, oats, prunes, beets, codfish. Bread was replaced by "KK bread" (from the German "Kleie und Kartoffeln": bran and potatoes), the ingredients of which remain unclear: potato flour, sawdust or ox blood. Malnutrition became a daily affair for the prisoner; after the war, many suffered serious digestive problems and adapted with difficulty to a new dietary regimen.

The Allied blockade of Germany played a role in this: from 6 November 1914, Germany was subjected to an economic blockade by the Entente nations. The military administration responsible for supplying the camps had much difficulty in feeding the troops, considered a priority, which partly explains the catastrophic state of supplies in the camps. Prisoners were not the only ones to suffer from the situation; the general population was also affected.

According to official directives concerning nourishment issued at the beginning of 1916, each week the prisoner was to have 600–1,000g of potatoes, 200-300g of vegetables at lunch, meat three times, fish twice and 150g of legumes. The reality could be far from what these menus prescribed. Not only was the food insufficient, it was often quite detrimental to health: "The other day I saw, in our kitchens, quarters of refrigerated beef of which the smell and greenish tint were so pronounced that our cooks refused to prepare them. The German head doctor, called to arbitrate, ordered them soaked in a solution of permanganate and, the day after the morrow, this meat, thus disinfected, decorated the ordinary one".

The food served in the camps, often the cause of illness, weakened the prisoners more than it kept them in shape. Only parcels and shipments from charitable bodies including the Central Prisoners of War Committee (in Britain), the Vetement du Prisonnier (in France), and the Red Cross, allowed them to hang on. By the end of the war, some 9,000,000 food parcels and 800,000 clothing parcels had been despatched to British prisoners abroad. Prisoners' families were also able to send food and other luxuries (although there were restrictions on what these parcels could contain). British prisoners, in particular, received parcels regularly and in abundance: French prisoners received far fewer, and Italians and Russians virtually none.

As the blockade increasingly affected the Germans, and as the system of food parcels became established, prisoners – especially the British, and especially officers – were sometimes better fed than the military personnel guarding them and the local civilian population. This naturally prompted resentment among the Germans, and food, like mail, became a means of pressure and revenge on the part of the camp authorities. Package inspections often gave rise to wasteful scenes:

At the kommandantur everything had been rummaged: the cans had all been punctured or opened, the chocolate broken into little pieces, the sausages cut lengthwise […] I saw them mixing in the same mess kit, or in the same container, meat, fish, vegetables, prunes, biscuits, pastries, jam […] What deplorable waste; it's a crime against humanity. […] Our indignation could be read in our eyes; these sons of dogs, or rather of wolves, sniggered with joy at it.

=== Hygiene and illnesses ===
From the beginning, questions of hygiene posed a problem in the camps, built in haste. The goal was to quickly build a maximum number of installations, which relegated sanitary considerations to the back burner. Camps in Germany featured only a simple faucet in the yard for thousands of people. Very often, latrines consisted of a simple board with a hole in the middle above a pit, which the prisoners were tasked with emptying at regular intervals. Because of their basic construction, the toilets often overflowed during powerful rains, making an unbreathable atmosphere prevail in the camps. Moreover, the clay-like soil turned to muck from the first rains.

Diseases such as typhus or cholera appeared very quickly. The close confinement of the accommodations and the number of prisoners per barrack, on average 250, partly explains the phenomenon, as the foul air circulated very little. An official policy of integration of different nationalities mean that typhus tended to spread rapidly from Russian troops, among whom it was endemic, to the French and British who had little immunity to it. In February 1915, the camp at Chemnitz was placed under quarantine; one prisoner wrote that the only vehicles approaching the camp were those transporting coffins. Serious outbreaks of typhus occurred at the camps at Wittenberg, Gardelegen, Cassel and Cottbus, among others: at Cassel, for example, of 18,300 prisoners, there were 7,218 cases of typhus, with a mortality rate of 11 per cent. In November 1915, a circular from the war ministry was sent to the various camps to put in place rules of hygiene. The fight against lice was at the centre of measures to be taken by using hair-removing creams and disinfecting rooms. Vaccines were also ordered, and a vaccination frenzy ensued. For instance, Charles Gueugnier was vaccinated against typhus on 28 September 1915, only to be re-vaccinated on 2 and 7 October. At Merseburg camp, the blankets were de-loused for the first time on 5 June 1915.

Cemeteries for deceased prisoners were gradually opened near the camps. It was a point of honour for the survivors to take care of their comrades' final resting places. Most often, each nationality had its own reserved patch. In certain camps, such as Gardelegen, veritable monuments were erected. Roger Pelletier motivated his comrades: "Doesn't it fall to us, who have known them, to all of us here who are their great family, to raise, in the cemetery where they rest, a monument of the French soul that, spreading above them like an aegis, will be above our dead, when we have left, as a memory and a goodbye?" Wilhelm Doegen estimates the number of dead in the camps at 118,159 but serious doubts surround this number, notably because Doegen failed to take certain diseases into account. Also according to Doegen, Russia suffered the heaviest losses (perhaps explained by the poorer nutrition of Russians, most of whom did not receive packages from their families) with a little over 70,000 dead, followed by France with 17,069 deaths, Romania with 12,512, and then Italy and the United Kingdom.

==== Psychological illnesses ====
A confinement that was visual as well as physical very quickly led to psychological illnesses among the prisoners, illnesses generally grouped under the heading of "barbed-wire psychosis" or "prisoner’s syndrome", around which the Anthelme Mangin affaire revolved. This psychasthenia was recognised by the Kriegsministerium (German War Ministry) in April 1917.

In addition, cases of epilepsy and of madness were identified due to physical or moral persecutions undergone in the camps. As for suicides (by hanging, throwing oneself onto the barbed-wire fences, etc.), as no formal statistic was drawn up, it is difficult to give a precise figure. However, based on documents from the Prussian War Ministry covering the years 1914 to 1919, Doegen counts 453 suicides by Russian prisoners and 140 by French ones.

=== Mail ===
Every month, a prisoner had the right to write two letters (limited to six pages each for officers, and four pages for other ranks), on paper that he had to buy at the camp, and four postcards. These were the numbers in theory, at least, though very often the practice differed. For the German authorities, mail represented a considerable source of pressure; the right to write and receive mail was regularly denied. In the first half of 1915, French prisoners sent 350,000 letters to France; the figure doubled in the second half of the year. On an average week, French prisoners received 45,000 letters containing money. This number fluctuated significantly: 8,356 such letters between 8 and 24 October 1914, 79,561 between 22 and 28 November 1915. Many prisoners did not know how to write and asked others to write for them. Censorship and package inspections were daily occurrences.

As the rations distributed in the camps were not sufficient to live on, and the prisoners wanted more than biscuits from the Red Cross, they survived thanks to parcels. Although French and British detainees tended to receive enough food in the mail, this was not the case for the Russians, the majority of whom were condemned to eat from rubbish bins or die of hunger.

=== Cultural and religious life ===
In most camps, libraries were opened at the end of October 1915. The books were generally offered by prisoners' aid committees. For example, in 1914, the camp at Münsigen received 220 books from the Stuttgart Red Cross. In 1915, the camp's library featured 2,500 titles in French and a thousand in Russian. Most of the books were gathered by donations from the public and by 1918 they were dispatching 1,000 to 2,000 books every week to various camps. Newspapers were also highly valued as they could bring news from the outside and the discovery of the smallest sheet excited a prisoner's eyes: "Read a fragment of a newspaper from Orléans […] Finally this bit of paper did us some good, for we were sick of all these German victories that they never stopped talking about." Then around January 1918, the CPWC (Central Prisoners of War Committee) started the monthly journal, The British Prisoner of War, which ran until the end of the war. Sometimes, theatrical troupes and orchestras performed, while camp newspapers saw publication in places like Zwickau, Ohrdruf and Stendal.

Religious practice had a place in prisoners' lives. From 1915, prayer rooms were built for Christians, Jews, and Muslims. If no prisoner capable of celebrating services or practicing ceremonies was found, it was prescribed that a German clergyman fill that role on the premises. The churches launched several initiatives and, at the end of August 1914, an inter-confessional aid commission was created, aiming to take care of spiritual life.

=== Detention and sentencings ===
Detention could take three forms. First, the Gelinder Arrest ("mild detention") of up to nine weeks simply involved locking up the prisoner, but theoretically with no further deprivation. Second was the Mittelarrest, lasting up to three weeks. The prisoner could receive nothing from the outside except 10000 g of potato bread and a supplement on the fourth day of captivity. Finally, the Strenger Arrest, lasting two weeks, was similar to the Mittelarrest but included light deprivation. If no detention cell was available in the camp, standing at a post was used as punishment, in which case German military regulations specified that prisoners punished with Strenger Arrest must also stand at a post for two hours a day.

Post punishment would become the symbol of this detention. The principle was simple: the prisoner was attached to a post, a tree or against a wall, hands behind his back, and had to remain in this position, which prevented him from moving, for a certain amount of time, without eating or drinking. Several variations on this punishment were invented, such as one where the prisoner was raised onto bricks while being attached and once he was solidly attached, the bricks were removed, rendering the punishment even more painful. The Hague Convention specified that "Prisoners of war shall be subject to the laws, regulations, and orders in force in the army of the State in whose power they are. Any act of insubordination justifies the adoption towards them of such measures of severity as may be considered necessary." Post punishment was applied in the German Army until its abolition on 18 May 1917; for prisoners, abolition came at the end of 1916 after a complaint by France.

Sabotage, espionage, sexual crimes, and murder were the most serious crimes, consequently judged by military tribunals. These could impose the death penalty, which, however, was never used except in the case of four British prisoners shot on 24 June 1918 upon the order of two German military tribunals for having killed a German guard during an escape attempt. From 1915 to 1918, the high court martial of Württemberg handed down 655 sentences. Prison terms might be for one year for aggravated insubordination or one to three years for bodily harm to a superior. Harsher penalties could reach up to 15 years; for instance, this was the term given to two French prisoners who murdered a guard in 1916.

=== Work ===
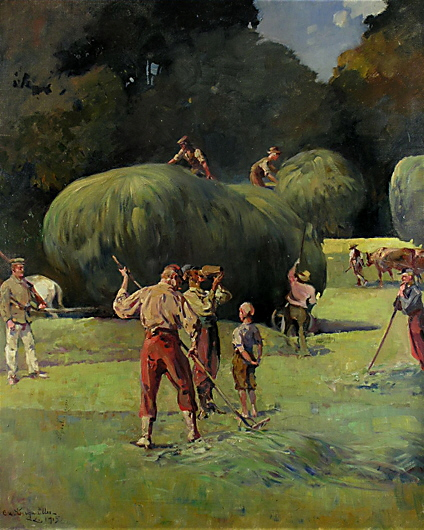
Prisoners during the harvest in 1915

"The State may utilize the labour of prisoners of war according to their rank and aptitude, officers excepted. The tasks shall not be excessive and shall have no connection with the operations of the war." A huge number of prisoners were used to work for the German Reich. Of 1,450,000 prisoners, 750,000 were employed in agricultural labour and 330,000 in industry. As able-bodied men were at the front, the lack of manpower was felt in all European belligerents and especially in Germany. The armaments industry, agriculture and mines were the three branches concerned. Prisoners of war represented an indispensable segment of the workforce. This is strikingly apparent, for instance, with regard to farm labour. In April 1915, 27,409 prisoners were working in agriculture in Prussia. Eight months later, their number had risen to 343,020 and in December 1916, 577,183.

While prisoners' labour was voluntary at the beginning, it very quickly became mandatory, organised into kommandos. The Ministry of War even set daily work quotas. Work in mines and swamps was dreaded as particularly painful; most of the time, agricultural work allowed for slightly better detention conditions. Certain prisoners, when they were employed by individuals, as was the case for Robert d'Harcourt and his comrade-in-arms, might be kept in castles, the city taking care to find them shelter. Food was also better than in the camps. Work was fixed at ten hours daily and guard surveillance was reduced (which allowed some prisoners to escape more easily).

The case of Russian prisoners demonstrates just how crucial the need for manpower was. The Treaty of Brest-Litovsk between Germany and Russia stipulated that prisoners of war "will be released to return to their homeland". However, most of the Russian prisoners were kept in order to sustain the German war effort through the end of the conflict.

Although prisoners were forced to work, some refused, which led to severe penalties, going up to prison terms of a year. Cases of "sabotage" were also reported, principally in factories, but also on farms. In Roger Pelletier's memoirs, there is an account of French prisoners suspected of having placed bits of iron into a crusher (of grains or beets) in order to damage it. Some acts of sabotage were more radical, above all a scheme involving the procurement of foot-and-mouth disease virus in order to decimate German livestock. However, the attitude most often adopted (and also the safest) was to work as little as possible. Since their labour was forced, the detainees did not expend all their effort on the enemy: "We worked with a certain constancy and a minimum of effort." The prisoners, although they contributed significantly to the German war effort, might also be considered as burdens due to their lack of qualifications or their unsuitability as workers on behalf of the enemy. For example, an imprisoned bureaucrat finding himself working in a field gave less results than if a civilian farmer had been given the work.

=== Propaganda ===
==== Among the population ====
When the first prisoners of war were captured, the German Army's superiority was put on display by making them march through towns, which produced scenes of collective hate. In certain train stations, mannequins dressed in Allied uniforms were hung, visible to prisoners passing by in trains: "I noticed that in many stations, the Krauts hung mannequins depicting sometimes a zouave, other times a grunt or an artilleryman." Camp visits were organised for schoolchildren. "Sunday, schoolchildren ordered about by their teachers with drums, fifes and flags toured the camp. We had to tour the cinemas and the…menageries surrounding the city, for the public would not stop flooding in. They were especially curious to see the troops from Africa."

During the war, this curiosity and propaganda underwent a transformation. Most of the German population realised that the fate of the prisoners of war was shared by their own absent detainees, and, from 1915, the prisoners noted that the visitors' vehemence had cooled. Little by little a relationship built on understanding developed, as Charles Gueugnier, a simple zouave, noted in his daily diary: "Beautiful day, many visitors around the camp; among this crowd black dominates: grief has driven away their insolent smugness. All these griefs that pass through, I sympathise with them and salute in them those who have died for their fatherland. Especially, all these little ones hurt me a lot, because it's sad." Work also allowed prisoners to know the population better and better, and the longer the war dragged on, the more relaxed these relationships became. Robert d'Harcourt notes: “The inhabitants seemed rather indifferent to the war. The neighbourhood barber's wife […] told me one day: 'What the f___ do we care about Alsace-Lorraine? Let them give it to the French and let the slaughter cease.' "

==== Inside the camps ====
Newspapers played an essential role in the propaganda effort. Prisoners needed to know their countries' and their families' situation, a fact well understood by the German authorities. Several sets of newspapers intended for prisoners were printed so that rumours would spread, in particular through mail to their families. In order to sap the enemy's morale, each newspaper had its targeted recipient group. For British prisoners, The Continental Times was printed; by 1916, this journal had a circulation of 15,000.

The French and the Belgians had their own analogous newspaper: La Gazette des Ardennes, founded in 1914 at Charleville and described by Charles Gueugnier as "true German poison". The lack of information led the prisoner to believe whatever he read, notably what was written in these newspapers. This was all the more so because expressions reinforcing the appearance of truth were inserted to convince the detainees, as seen in the 1 November 1914 edition of La Gazette des Ardennes, its first issue: "La Gazette des Ardennes will rigorously refrain from inserting any false news […] The sole objective of this newspaper is thus to make known events in all their sincerity and we hope thereby to accomplish a useful endeavour."

== Escapes ==
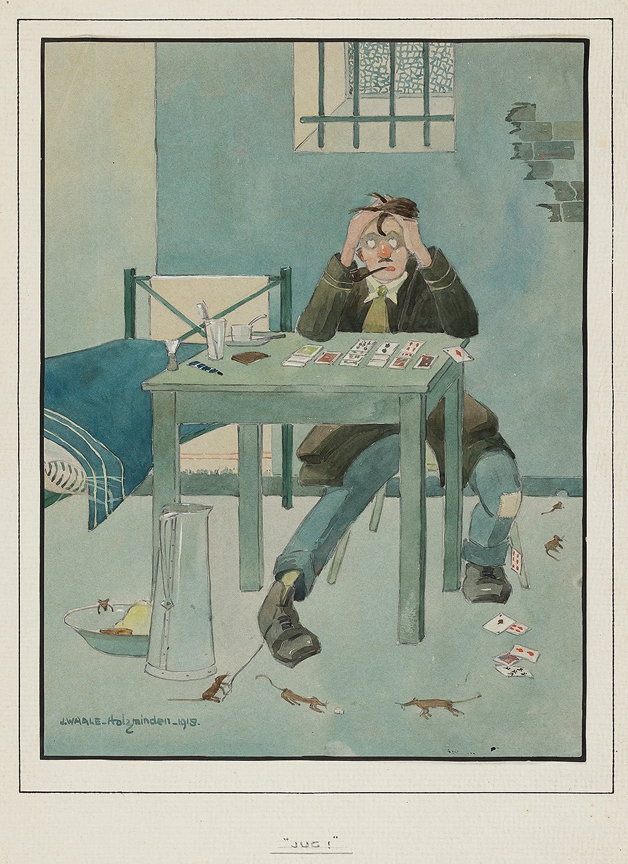
"Jug": cartoon by James Whale of a prisoner in solitary confinement at Holzminden officers' camp

Escapes had been discussed by the Hague Convention: "Escaped prisoners who are retaken before being able to rejoin their own army or before leaving the territory occupied by the army which captured them are liable to disciplinary punishment. Prisoners who, after succeeding in escaping, are again taken prisoners, are not liable to any punishment on account of the previous flight."

"Upon arriving in a camp, a prisoner’s first care is to get to know his enclosure […] I observed right away that there was little hope in this regard." For prisoners, escape signified not only flight from the conditions of detention but also regaining their status as soldiers and being able once again to fight and lead their country to victory. Military honour and patriotism were powerful motivators. Most of the time, escapes occurred from work kommandos, from which it was easier to hide. Escape required great psychological and physical preparation. Going to the nearest town to take a train or walking to the border implied a considerable effort, especially considering that prisoners were underfed. Moreover, they could not use well-travelled roads lest they be found. A prisoner had to blend in, adopt local mannerisms so as not to appear suspicious, know how to speak German and have credible civilian clothing: "The state of an escapee's soul? It's not fear. It's tension of the spirit, a perpetual 'who goes there?' "

Officers were more likely than other ranks to attempt to escape: first, from a sense that it was their duty to return to active military service, or at least to divert German manpower into searching for them; second because, exempt from labour and in more regular receipt of parcels from home (in which escape equipment was often smuggled), officers had more time and opportunity to plan and prepare their escapes; and third because the punishment on recapture was generally limited to a period in solitary confinement, considered by many to be an acceptable risk. One of the best-known escapes of the war was from Holzminden officers' camp on the night of 23/24 July 1918, when 29 British officers escaped through a tunnel which had been under excavation for nine months: of the 29, ten succeeded in making their way to the neutral Netherlands and eventually back to Britain. Other notable Allied escape attempts were from the "Listening Hotel" at Karlsruhe (also British) and from Villingen (primarily US).

Certain Germans helped prisoners in their escape attempts. During his second try, Robert d'Harcourt hid in a warehouse, where a German found him. The latter did not denounce him, instead helping him leave the city that night: "[…] then he guided me across a maze of back-alleys and yards, through which I would never have found my way alone, until the entrance to a street where he left me, not without first vigorously shaking my hand and wishing me good luck." The sympathy of women is equally remarked upon by Riou and d'Harcourt. Once the escape was successful, the prisoner was sent to his regimental barracks to undergo an interrogation. In effect, the home authorities had to make sure the escape was authentic and not a spy trick. If the operation failed, the escapee was taken back to the camp to be punished. The frustration generated by failure very often led the recaptured prisoner to develop plans for the next attempt; this was the case for Charles de Gaulle and Robert d'Harcourt. Of 313,400 escapes counted for the war's duration, 67,565 succeeded.

== The role of humanitarian organizations ==
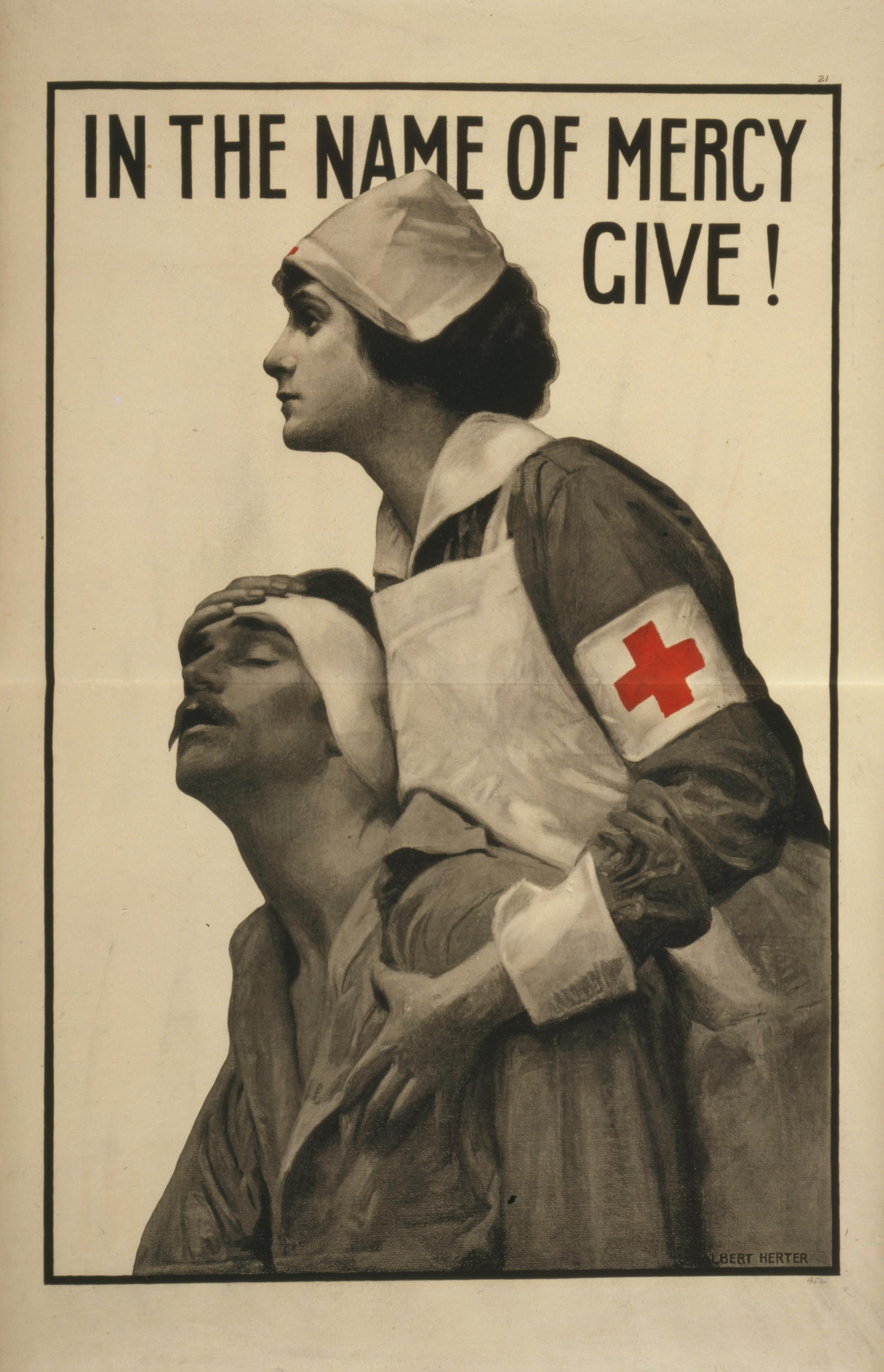
Red Cross poster

Ever since the Red Cross was founded in 1863, humanitarian societies have played an important role in wartime, and World War I, together with its prisoners, was no exception. It was first and foremost responsible for feeding them; the distribution of food packages from the Red Cross, most of the time containing biscuits, was highly anticipated. By December 1915, 15,850,000 individual packages had been distributed and 1,813 railcars chartered for the transport of collective shipments.

The action of the Red Cross and other humanitarian societies was facilitated by their official recognition through the Second Hague Convention: "Relief societies for prisoners of war, which are properly constituted in accordance with the laws of their country and with the object of serving as the channel for charitable effort shall receive from the belligerents, for themselves and their duly accredited agents every facility for the efficient performance of their humane task within the bounds imposed by military necessities and administrative regulations. Agents of these societies may be admitted to the places of internment for the purpose of distributing relief, as also to the halting places of repatriated prisoners, if furnished with a personal permit by the military authorities, and on giving an undertaking in writing to comply with all measures of order and police which the latter may issue."

The Red Cross, not content merely with helping prisoners, also lent assistance to families who did not know where their loved ones were being held, by ensuring that the latter received mail or money intended for them. Its International Prisoners-of-War Agency in Geneva was the largest non-governmental institution to have come to the prisoners' aid. With a daily average of 16,500 letters asking for information on prisoners over the course of the war, this organisation became a sine qua non.

The camps were also inspected by delegations from neutral countries, notably Switzerland, and most often by representatives of the Red Cross. During these visits, most prisoners noticed a perceptible improvement in (for instance) food quality, the German authorities seeing to it that the inspectors were fooled. At the end of the war, the Red Cross took part in prisoners' repatriation, but it also helped initiate prisoner exchanges and internments in Switzerland.

== Civilian prisoners and deportees ==
Ribbon of the Médaille des prisonniers civils, déportés et otages de la Grande Guerre 1914-1918

Soldiers were not the only ones made prisoner during the war; civilian populations were also impacted. Historian Annette Becker has extensively studied this aspect of the war. After the invasion, the German Army started by taking hostages, first of all the towns' leading citizens. Several invaded countries were affected by civilian deportations: France, Belgium, Romania, Russia, etc. 100,000 were deported from France and Belgium.

From 1914, both male and female civilians aged 14 and over from the occupied zones were forced to work, quite often on projects related to the war effort, such as the rebuilding of infrastructure destroyed by fighting (roads, rail tracks, etc.). In short order, the civilians began to be deported to forced labour camps. There, they formed the Zivilarbeiter-Bataillone (civilian workers’ battalions) and wore a distinctive mark: a red armband. Becker indicates that their living conditions resembled those of the prisoners – that is, they were harsh. The hostages were sent to camps in Prussia or Lithuania, and some of them remained prisoners until 1918.

Like the military prisoners, civilians were subject to exchanges, and a bureau for the repatriation of civilian detainees was created at Bern in 1916. At the end of the war, civilian prisoners formed an association, the Union nationale des prisonniers civils de guerre. By 1936, three decorations had been established intending to honour their sacrifices: the Médaille des victimes de l'invasion (1921), Médaille de la Fidélité Française (1922) and the Médaille des prisonniers civils, déportés et otages de la Grande Guerre 1914-1918 (1936).

== Wounded prisoners ==
Wounded prisoners benefited from the 1864 Geneva Convention, article 6 of which stated: "Wounded or sick combatants, to whatever nation they may belong, shall be collected and cared for." Wounded soldiers were transported to a "Lazarett", the most important of which was the Lazarett Saint-Clément of Metz. In his book, Robert d'Harcourt gives a very detailed description of the treatments practiced on prisoners.

Amputation was commonplace, even when unnecessary, and care quite rudimentary.

Charles Hennebois touches on a wrenching aspect concerning the wounded. Some of them, instead of being transported to the hospital, were finished off on the field of battle: "Men wounded the day before were calling them from afar and asking to drink. The Germans finished them off by butting them with their rifles or bayoneting them, then despoiling them. I saw this from several metres away. A group of seven or eight men, felled by machine-gun crossfire, found itself at that point. Several were still alive, as they were begging the soldiers. They were finished off like I just said, shaken down and heaped up in a pile." This claim is refuted in a German propaganda book about what happened in the camps published in 1918.

== Prisoner exchanges, internment in neutral countries, and repatriation ==
In all, 219,000 prisoners were exchanged.

During the war, some prisoners were sent to neutral Switzerland on grounds of ill health. Internment conditions were very strict in Switzerland but softened with time. Only the following illnesses could lead to departure from Germany: diseases of the circulatory system, serious nervous problems, tumours and severe skin diseases, blindness (total or partial), serious face injuries, tuberculosis, one or more missing limbs, paralysis, brain disorders like paraplegia or haemiplegia and serious mental illnesses. From 1917, the criteria were extended to prisoners older than 48 or who had spent over eighteen months in captivity. In 1915, 4,000 French and almost 1,000 German medical staff were exchanged; and in 1916 2,970 French medical staff were exchanged for 1,150 German medical staff. The Allies made similar exchanges with the medical staff of the Austro-Hungarian Empire. The Red Cross helped initiate these internments, which it proposed at the end of 1914 and which were implemented from February 1915 onwards. Approval for departure from a prisoner of war camp did not guarantee freedom, but rather transfer to Konstanz, where a medical commission was located to verify the prisoner's condition and suitability for internment in Switzerland.

== The return from captivity ==
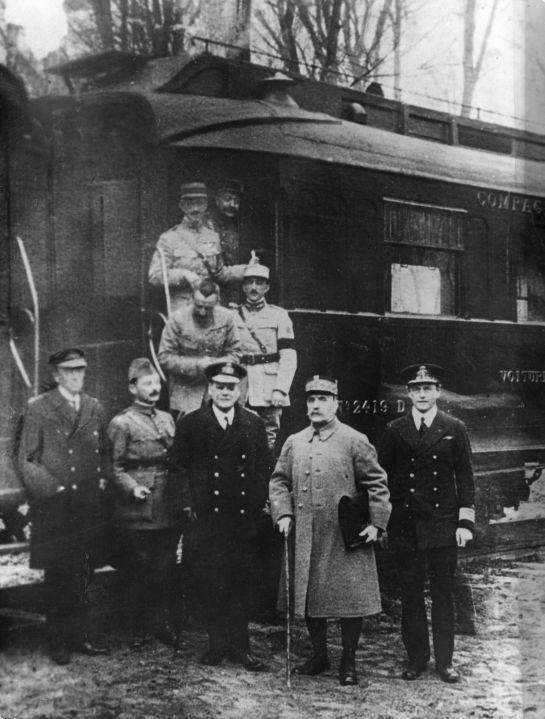
For some, the Armistice meant the end of four years' captivity

One clause of the 11 November 1918 Armistice dealt with the matter of prisoner-of-war repatriation: "The immediate repatriation without reciprocity, according to detailed conditions which shall be fixed, of all allied and United States prisoners of war, including persons under trial or convicted. The allied powers and the United States shall be able to dispose of them as they wish." By 10 October 1918, 1,434,529 Russians had been made prisoner since the start of the war, as had 535,411 Frenchmen, 185,329 Britons, 147,986 Romanians, 133,287 Italians, 46,019 Belgians, 28,746 Serbs, 7,457 Portuguese, 3,847 Canadians, 2,457 Americans, 107 Japanese and 5 Montenegrins. Of the non-Russians, some 576,000 had been repatriated by the end of December 1918, and all by the beginning of February 1919.

=== French prisoners' return ===
Numerous prisoners left Germany however they could: on foot, by wagon, automobile or train. General Dupont was charged with the task of repatriating 520,579 French prisoners. 129,382 of these were returned by sea, 4,158 through Italy, 48,666 through Switzerland and 338,373 through northern France. German soldiers also helped in the operation. There were no scenes of vengeance, the prisoners' sole wish being to return home.

Upon their arrival in France, the former prisoners were brought together to undergo medical examinations. Then they were sent to different barracks to fill out forms and be interrogated. The authorities sought to assemble proof of ill-treatment, which the prisoners tended to deny so as to be reunited more quickly with their families. The poor condition of accommodations in France was noted by a number of men, including Charles Gueugnier: "Entering there, the heart tightened; one was caught by an irrepressible disgust. They dared call this Augean stable American Park! Really, we were better and more properly housed by our Prussian enemies! Poor mothers, what will they do with your children? Those among you who miraculously came back from that ghastly mêlée more or less wounded or sick were treated here worse than dogs or pigs." The return to their homes was chaotic and deeply unorganised (no information on trains, etc.).

The Ministry of War gave instructions meant to lend more warmth to the former prisoners' return: "The people should give them a cordial welcome, to which the sufferings of captivity have given them the right." By mid-January 1919, all French prisoners had returned home.

=== British and American prisoners' return ===
Overall, these prisoners were speedily repatriated. There were fewer to deal with from these countries: some 185,000 Britons and 2,450 Americans, compared to the over half-million France had. The first British ex-captives reached Calais on 15 November, slated to be taken to Dover via Dunkirk.

=== Russian prisoners' return ===
In December 1918, there were still 1.2 million Russian prisoners on German territory. They had been kept as workers following the signature of the German-Russian armistice in 1917. The Russian Revolution had been one of the pretexts allegedly making their repatriation impossible. An inter-allied commission fixed the deadline for their return at 24 January 1919. However, 182,748 Russian prisoners on German soil were counted by the 8 October 1919 census, and some were left as late as 1922.

=== Other prisoners' return ===
Italian prisoners, most of whom were held in Austrian camps, were repatriated in disorganised fashion. In November 1918, some 500,000 prisoners were placed under quarantine in Italian camps; the operations were finished in January 1919.

== The prisoners and historiography ==
Historiography has played a vital role in emphasizing and giving the proper place due to the theme of World War I prisoners of war, though at first it ignored them and they were only gradually rehabilitated. The historiography of the Great War can be divided into three phases. The first is the military and diplomatic phase. Antoine Prost and Jay Winter (2004) speak of preserving the national atmosphere. Captivity was absent from all that was written on the conflict at the time. For instance, in 1929 Jean Norton Cru published a study of writings by former combatants: "The goal of this book is to give an image of the war according to those who saw it up close." None of the 300 collected writings was by a former prisoner of war. The second phase was social, and the third is the social-cultural phase, wherein the prisoners have retaken their place.

The first French book to describe the conditions of prisoners' captivity appeared in 1929. Georges Cahen-Salvador described his book as a "tribute to the truth". However, it was not until the end of the 20th century that historians conducted research on this subject. Annette Becker, Stéphane Audoin-Rouzeau and Odon Abbal are among this group.

In Germany, one of the few complete studies of the phenomenon was written by a university professor, Uta Hinz. As for Italy, Giovanna Procacci's book Soldati e prigionieri italiani nella grande guerra. Con una raccolta di lettere inedite discusses Italian prisoners through their letters. Several studies have been published in other countries but the subject remains little discussed overall.

== Recognition for the prisoners ==
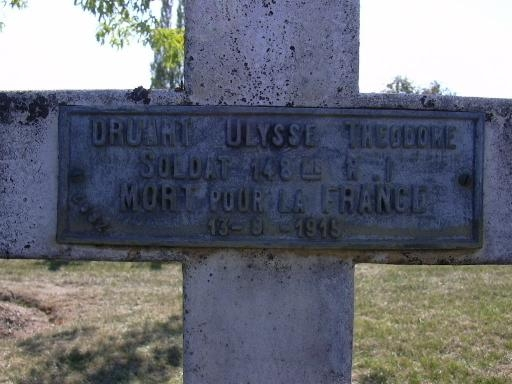
Grave of Ulysse Théodore Druart, a prisoner who died in captivity at Cologne in 1915 and whose body was reburied at the Nécropole de Sarrebourg

Repatriated prisoners were welcomed with various sorts of demonstrations, especially if they returned before the war ended (for instance those interned in Switzerland). British prisoners received a message in the hand of King George V welcoming them.

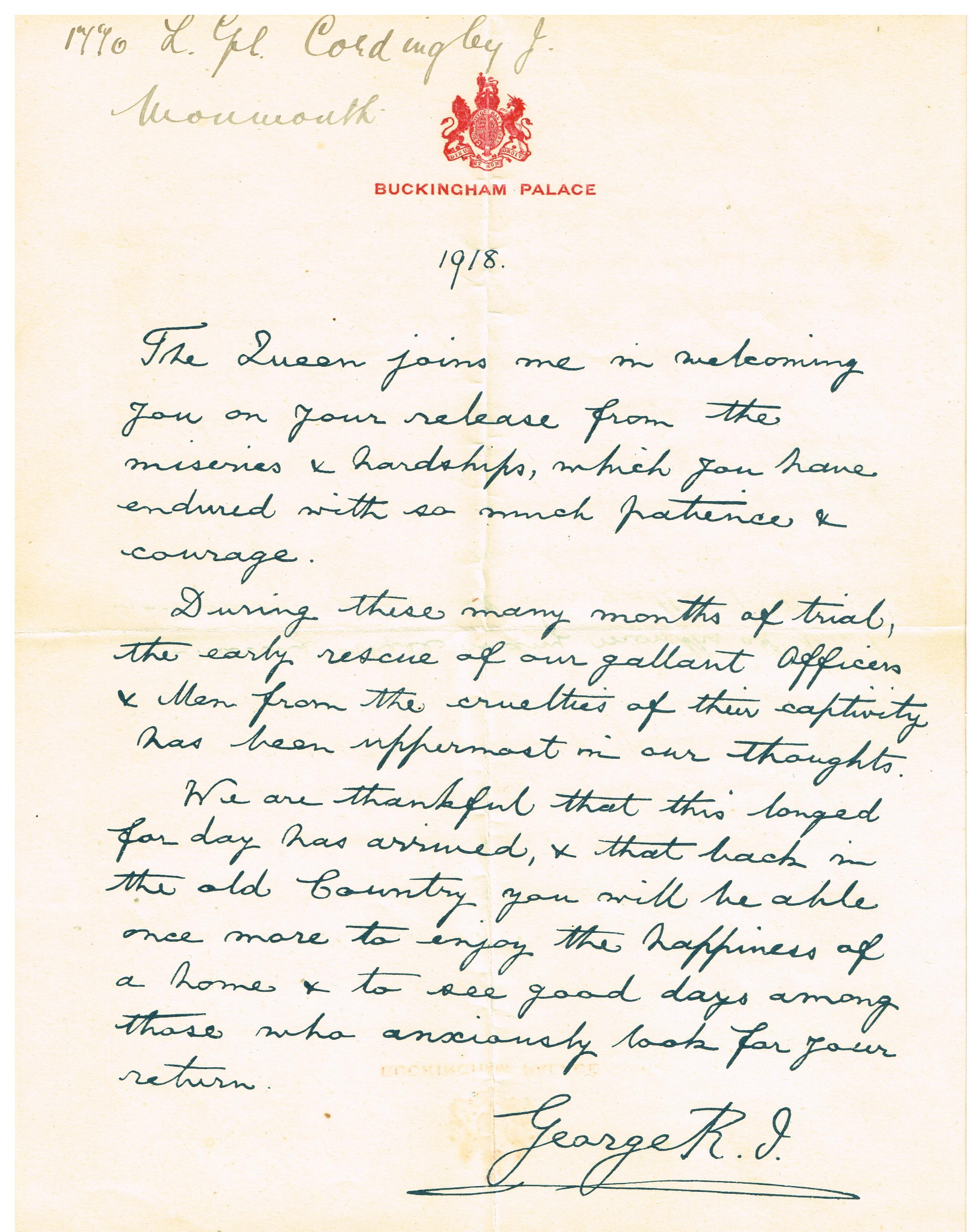
Letter of welcome from King George V to returned prisoner Lance-Corporal James Cordingley, 1918: printed in a facsimile of the King's hand

In France, prisoners were disappointed as they did not receive the honours they had hoped for. Their moral fight in the camps was not recognised: "At Nîmes, they gave me 500 francs from my savings and a costume made from bad sheeting that they called the Clemenceau costume […] A new life was beginning for me but it was no longer the same thing. 25 years old, not a sou in my pocket, my health weakened by poison gas, bronchitis… In sum, I was disgusted by life". Bitterness took root. Prisoners were excluded from the Médaille militaire and the Croix de guerre. Wounded men could receive the Insigne des blessés but prisoners obtained no distinction and were also excluded from war memorials. The fact that one had been a prisoner was perceived as shameful by public opinion.

In addition, war narratives were transformed into literature by (among others) the publishing houses, which distorted the perception and treatment of captivity. Nicolas Beaupré cites the letter of one of Éditions Berger-Levrault's directors in which he insists on giving a direction to the publication of war stories, more for vainglory than a depiction of events: "Currently we, more than any other publishing house, are editing, as much at Nancy as in Paris, with very restrained means. If we can hold on and publish only good publications on the war, the House will emerge from the conflict in more of a starring role than before." Still, sales for war stories quickly dropped as popular demand shifted elsewhere.

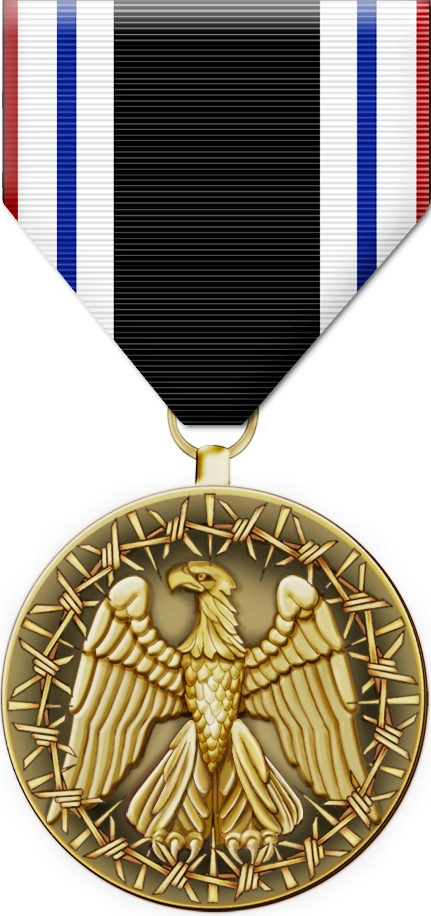
Prisoner of War Medal awarded to former American prisoners

Besides the payment of indemnities to soldiers, former combatants received 20 francs for each month spent on the front. Prisoners received 15 francs and were not recognised as veterans. Thus, prisoners united to try to claim their rights. The Fédération Nationale des Anciens Prisonniers de Guerre included 60,000 former prisoners. One of these wrote, "Our glory is to have had, instead of citations, ribbons and stripes, the honours of the post, the hot room, the cold room, the reprisal prison." Politically, they managed to secure several rights, notably the ability to repatriate the bodies of soldiers who had died in captivity and especially to have them benefit from the distinction Mort pour la France, which they obtained in 1922. The Sarrebourg Necropolis was dedicated to them. However, the ex-prisoners did not manage to lay hold of the 1.26 billion francs in indemnities that they had claimed.

In Italy, the prisoners of war were forgotten, a fate seen in other countries too. In the United States, a Prisoner of War Medal was established, but only in 1986. Prisoners symbolised what the public did not wish to see. For the latter, they were not part of the war, did not defend their country and were living symbols of defeat. Thus, the memory of the prisoners was voluntarily buried, just as they themselves tried to forget in order to continue to live. However, they were the ones best suited to reflect on the Germans with whom they lived. The richness of their memoirs reveals analyses that are sometimes quite advanced, as is for instance the case with Jacques Rivière. For historiography, the prisoner is a hinge between two countries, who can reveal the importance of what was culturally and nationally at stake during the period.

== Leipzig trials ==
Under the terms of the Treaty of Versailles, a series of trials of alleged German war criminals was held in Leipzig, Germany, in May–July 1921. Of the twelve accused, seven, whose rank ranged from a private to a major-general, were charged with mistreating prisoners of war. Four were found guilty, and sentenced to prison terms ranging from a few months to two years. Outside Germany, the trials were regarded as a travesty because of the apparent leniency of the court; while inside Germany they were seen as excessively harsh.

== Memoirs ==
There were prisoners who, from the beginning of the war, began writing down the events they witnessed, usually in diary form. Soldiers could write on the front, but in the camps they were forbidden not only to write but even to possess paper. All writings found during searches were systematically confiscated and their authors punished. Thus attempts began to hide the notes from the enemy, which gave rise to some ingenious discoveries on the prisoners' part. Diaries were most often used, first of all, because they were the simplest format. Thus the journal acquired historic value because the events recorded there had a vivid immediacy to them. The fact that many of them were written every day removed some critical distance, which one must account for when examining these writings.

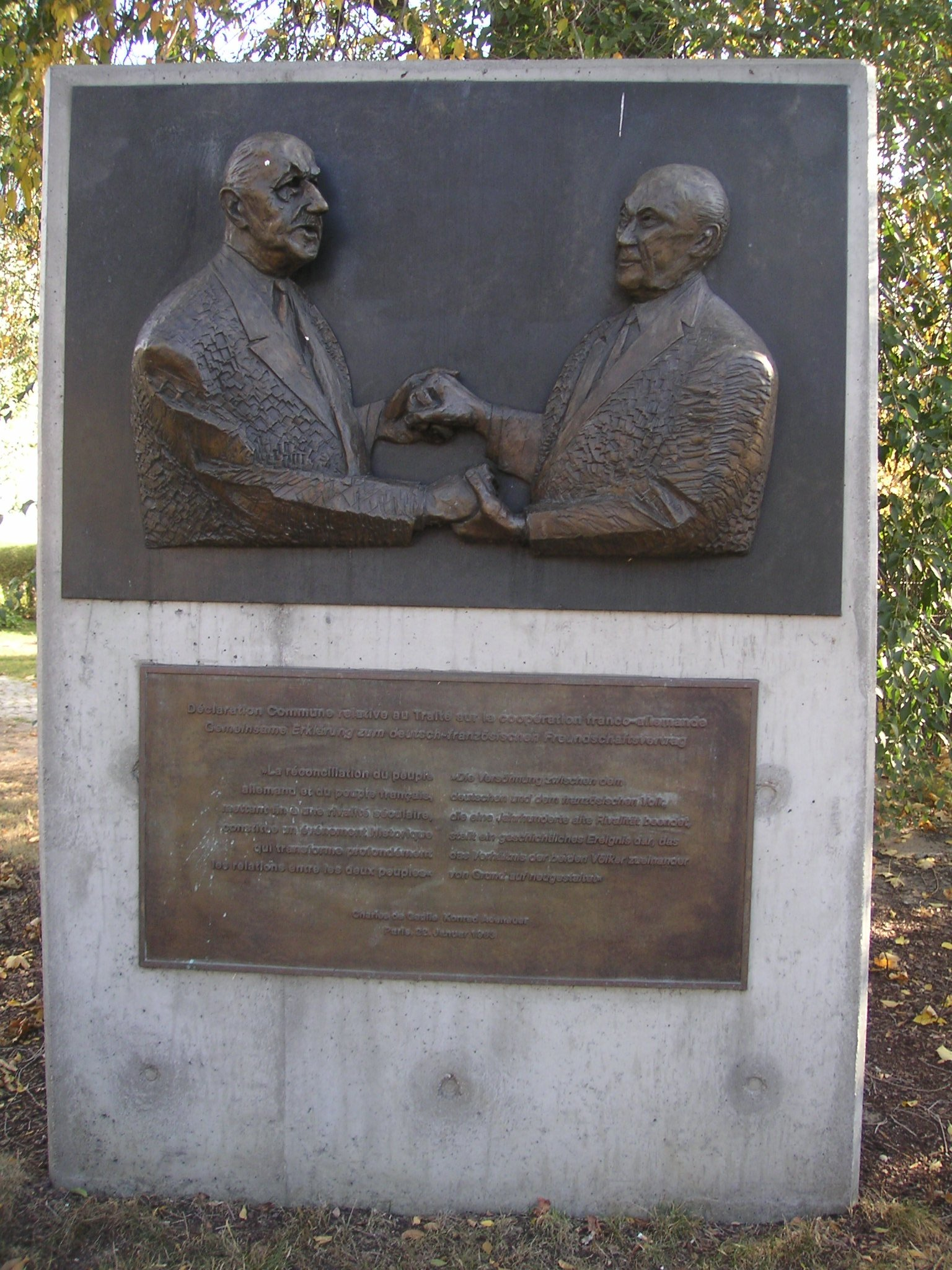
Charles de Gaulle and Konrad Adenauer, who pursued an improvement in Franco-German relations

Memoirs written after the period of captivity are of an entirely different sort. These later writings became the place where a profound reflection on the situation could be made, something less suitable for the daily diaries. Following the example of Gaston Riou in France, some prisoners became writers or resumed their occupation as writers. In 1924, Thierry Sandre won the Prix Goncourt for three volumes, one of which was his captivity narrative, Le Purgatoire. Some of these authors entered the literary tradition: in Le Purgatoire, for instance, Sandre dedicates each chapter to influential members of the era's literary society such as Claude Farrère or Christian-Frogé, secretary of the Association des écrivains combattants. Robert d'Harcourt, who had also been a prisoner, published a memoir that was reprinted several times. Jacques Rivière is one of the authors who thought seriously about the meaning of captivity. In his book L'Allemand ("The German"), reprinted in 1924, the reader finds a thorough psychological and philosophical analysis of the former enemy.

In France, intellectuals, because they had a chance of being published and could call on their "audience" to purchase their books, were able to express themselves on the subject of captivity. Their message, which naturally was not representative of all prisoners' experiences, took several forms. Gaston Riou developed European themes in 1928 in his best-known work, Europe, ma patrie. The rapprochement with Germany that he outlined remained solely cultural, indeed superficial. Jacques Rivière, a prisoner since 24 August 1914, took an entirely different approach, developed in L'Allemand: "I must confess frankly: a relationship is described here, rather than an objective, rather than an appearance […] The subject of my book is Franco-German antagonism." Rivière developed a theory of economic rapprochement that would find fruition after the next world war: "Forgetfulness will develop, in Germany and here, if we know to organise industrial unity in the Rhine basin, if we know to harmoniously regulate trade there […] There is all the same, in our current occupation of the Ruhr, with whatever intensity it has borne the Franco-German crisis, the foreshadowing of an equilibrium and a possible harmony between the two countries."

Robert d'Harcourt fought against prejudice in order to render the most objective image of Germany he could, whether positive or negative. Former prisoner Charles de Gaulle firmly believed that the countries’ populations lay at the base of Franco-German relations. These former prisoners allowed themselves to transcend their captivity and all it had engendered. However, such men were never designated as former prisoners of war per se. Prisoners appeared as men who should indirectly use their experiences in order to be recognised as a result. The status of prisoner was not one that was proclaimed proudly. It forced its owner to leave behind a part of his own story in order to allow another part of history to develop: the history of reconciliation.

== In the arts ==
=== Cinema ===
La Grande Illusion, a 1937 film by Jean Renoir, depicts the story of two French officers of the First World War sent to a PoW camp in Germany. They decide to escape by digging a tunnel in perilous conditions. After several aborted escape attempts and repeated transfers, they are placed in a mountain fortress. The story does not portray negative characters: soldiers or guards, the Germans are good guys, while the Allied prisoners perform their duties conscientiously but without excessive heroism. As shown, the camps of 1914-18 (at least the officers' camps) do not give the impression of a frightening inferno.

Who Goes Next?, a 1938 film directed by Maurice Elvey, was a fictionalised account of the tunnel escape from Holzminden.

=== Theatre ===
Le voyageur sans bagage is a play by Jean Anouilh written in 1937 (reprinted in 1958) and deals with the true story of the Anthelme Mangin (Octave Monjoin) affair. A French soldier and former prisoner of war afflicted with barbed-wire psychosis returns to freedom.
