= First United Methodist Church of Orlando =

Church in Orlando, United States of America

Coordinates: 28.53886°N 81.37698°W

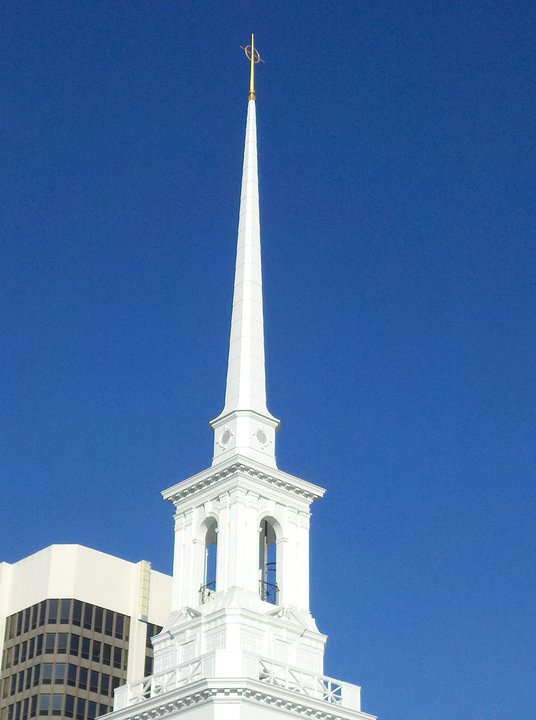
First United Methodist church of Orlando Steeple

First United Methodist Church of Orlando is a church located in Downtown Orlando. Founded in 1882, First United Methodist Church has been a presence in Central Florida for over 125 years. The church has helped found many non-profit and charitable organizations, including the Coalition for the Homeless and IDignity.

After a sale of property to the City of Orlando and the Dr. Phillips Center for the Performing Arts, First United Methodist Church of Orlando undertook a multimillion-dollar building project that revitalized its campus and changed the look of downtown. The new ministry building for First United Methodist Church of Orlando opened in September 2011 and held a special dedication on October 2, 2011.
