= Le Voyageur sans bagage =

1937 play written by Jean Anouilh

Le Voyageur sans bagage (The Traveller Without Luggage) is a 1937 play in five scenes by Jean Anouilh. Incidental music for the original production was written by Darius Milhaud and for the play's first Paris revivals by Francis Poulenc.

== Plot ==
Gaston, a veteran of World War I, suffers from amnesia and has spent the last 18 years in a hospital trying to regain his memories. Although he's claimed as a son by various families, a rich Duchess believes the true family Gaston belongs to is the Renauds. Gaston travels to the Renauds' estate alongside his lawyer, Huspar. A docile character, Gaston discovers his former identity of Jacques Renaud: a cruel and violent young man who used to kill animals for sport. He learns that immediately prior to the war he pushed his best friend, Marcel, down a flight of stairs, breaking his back, shortly after seeing him kiss the maid Juliette, with whom Jacques had been intimate. Gaston has difficulty reconciling his current personality with that of his past. His brother's wife, Valentine (with whom he had an affair during adolescence), tells him about a tiny scar on his shoulder, sustained when Valentine attacked him with a hat pin in a fit of jealousy. Gaston sees this scar in a mirror but doesn't tell Valentine about it. Soon thereafter, numerous families arrive at the Renaud estate, searching for their lost loved one from the war. Gaston spots a young boy. This boy, who is the only surviving member of the Madensales, a family who died in a boating accident when he was an infant, is searching for his long-lost nephew who happens to be much older than himself. Gaston tells the young boy about the scar on his shoulder and fabricates a story about the scar belonging to the boy's long-lost nephew. Gaston leaves the Renauds to become a member of the boy's family, later writing a letter to Jacques' brother Georges, stating that their Jacques is dead and they need not search for him any longer.

== Inspiration and reception ==
Inspired by the story of an amnesiac soldier, Anthelme Mangin, who was claimed by over a dozen families, the play was first presented on 16 February 1937 and was Anouilh's first major hit with critics and audiences alike. According to biographer Edward Owen Marsh, the playwright enjoyed "his first financial success in the theatre, when perhaps the poorest theatre-director in Paris, Georges Pitoëff, produced what is generally considered to be one of Anouilh's finest plays, Le Voyageur sans bagage. This production put the seal on his reputation and marked him as one of the most interesting younger dramatists."

The play first appeared in English as Identity Unknown in an adaptation by Alice Wagstaffe, presented at the Duke of York's Theatre, London on three consecutive Sundays in December 1937. As The Traveller Without Luggage, the play was next presented in the UK at the Bristol Old Vic on 3 September 1951, in a translation by Lewis Galantière. Subsequent translators of the play included the playwright John Whiting and actress Lucienne Hill.

== Original productions ==
Paris – premiere – Théâtre des Mathurins, 16 February 1937

- Gaston – Georges Pitoëff
- Georges Renaud – Louis Salou
- Mme Renaud – Marthe Mellot
- Valentine Renaud – Nadine Picard
- La duchesse Dupont-Dufort – Nora Sylvère
- Maître Huspar – Raymond Dagand
- Le petit garçon – Ludmilla Pitoëff
- Maître Picwick – Henri Grall
- Le maître d’hôtel – Henri Gaultier
- Le chauffeur – Léon Larive
- Le valet de chambre – Gabriel Gobin
- La cuisinière – Andrée Tainsy
- Juliette – Madeleine Milhaud

Directed by Georges Pitoëff

Bristol – UK postwar premiere, as The Traveller Without Luggage – Bristol Old Vic, 3 September 1951

- Gaston – Laurence Payne
- Georges Renaud – Michael Aldridge
- Mme Renaud – Helen Haye
- Valerie [ie, Valentine] Renaud – Pamela Alan
- Duchess Dupont-Dufort – Elaine Wodson
- Mr Huspar – Anthony Jacobs
- A small boy – David Preston
- Mr Pickwick [sic] – David Edwards
- A butler – Newton Blick
- A chauffeur – Christopher Burgess
- A valet – John Neville
- A maid – Prunella Scales
- Juliette – Sheila Burrell

Directed by Denis Carey Translated by Lewis Galantière

London – as Traveller Without Luggage – Arts Theatre, 29 January 1959

- Gaston – Denholm Elliott
- Georges Renaud – Geoffrey Keen
- Mme Renaud – Irene Browne
- Valentine Renaud – Elizabeth Sellars
- The Duchesse Dupont-Dufort – Joyce Carey
- Maître Huspar – Douglas Wilmer
- A small boy – Hugh James
- Mr Picwick – Norman Pitt
- A butler – Anthony Blake
- A chauffeur – James Wellman
- A valet – John Warner
- A cook – Peggy Ann Clifford
- Juliette – Violetta

Directed by Peter Hall Translated by John Whiting

New York – premiere, as Traveller Without Luggage – ANTA Playhouse, 17 September 1964

- Gaston – Ben Gazzara
- Georges Renaud – Stephen Elliott
- Mme Renaud – Mildred Dunnock
- Valentine Renaud – Nancy Wickwire
- The Duchess – Margaret Braidwood
- Monsieur Huspar – Boris Tumarin
- A small boy – Jeffrey Neal
- Mr Truggle [ie, Maître Picwick] – Ronald Dawson
- A butler – William Cottrell
- A valet – Anthony Palmer
- Juliette – Rae Allen

Directed by Robert Lewis Translated by Lucienne Hill

== Revivals and adaptations ==
Le Voyageur sans bagage was given its first Paris revival at the Théâtre de la Michodière on 1 April 1944, with Pierre Fresnay playing Gaston. As director, Fresnay modelled the production on the original by the since-deceased Pitoëff, but Francis Poulenc was engaged to replace the original's incidental music, which had been composed by Darius Milhaud. This revival opened shortly after the premiere of a film version, also starring Fresnay and directed by Anouilh himself.

Further Paris revivals followed at the Théâtre Montparnasse on 6 April 1950 (directed by André Barsacq, with the Poulenc score again and Michel Vitold as Gaston) and back at the play's original home, the Théâtre des Mathurins, on 15 September 1973, directed by Nicole Anouilh (the playwright's wife), with Daniel Ivernel and, later, Pierre Vaneck as Gaston. For this revival the Milhaud music was restored and Anouilh made some changes to the text, claiming that some of the original expressions were "franchement démodés" (frankly outmoded).

In addition to the 1944 film version, the play has been adapted several times for television - in the UK (October 1959, February 1965), Australia (August 1961), Canada (January 1962), Spain (February 1964, February 1968), and France (September 2004, directed by Pierre Boutron). The play has also been adapted for BBC Radio, first in March 1953 and subsequently in June 1980. A new stage adaptation by Anthony Weigh, transposed to 1950s America and titled Welcome Home, Captain Fox!, was produced at London's Donmar Warehouse in March 2016.

In India, on Mumbai (Bombay) Doordarshan TV the play was directed in Marathi by celebrated Marathi director Chandrakant Kulkarni and performed by Bhakti Barve Inamdar, Tushar Dalvi (title role), Aardra Athalye (small boy), Prasad Athalye and others. The play's Marathi name was Ozyawina Pravashi.
