= IDignity =

U.S. nonprofit organization

- Formation: May 1, 2008; 18 years ago
- Registration no.: CH33167
- Headquarters: Orlando, FL
- Key people: Michael Dippy
- Website: https://idignity.org/

IDignity is a non-profit organization based in Downtown Orlando that assists U.S. citizens and legal residents in acquiring the necessary legal documentation required by the Real ID Act to obtain an identification card. The organization helps individuals obtain their Florida State ID (or Driver's License), Birth Certificates (from any U.S. state or territory), Social Security Card, and other supporting documents for free.

IDignity operates a central location in Orlando, FL, and has additional chapters in Volusia County, Seminole County, and Osceola County.

== History ==
IDignity was founded and is supported by five churches in downtown Orlando: The Cathedral Church of St. Luke, First Presbyterian Church of Orlando, First United Methodist Church of Orlando, St. James Cathedral in Orlando, and Trinity Lutheran Church. This initiative emerged when Project Homeless Connect identified the lack of affordability of identification documents as a prevalent issue among the homeless population.

Michael Dippy, IDignity's Executive Director, was honored as the 2011 Central Floridian of the Year for his dedication to the organization.

In 2019, IDignity's first legal counsel, Jacqueline "Jackie" Dowd, received The Florida Bar Foundation's Jane Elizabeth Curran Distinguished Service Award for her contributions to improving access to civil justice for underserved communities.
