= Genealogical bewilderment =

Identity crisis over unknown biological ancestry

Genealogical bewilderment is a term referring to potential identity problems that could be experienced by a child who was either fostered, adopted, or conceived via an assisted reproductive technology procedure such as surrogacy or gamete donation (egg or sperm donation).

The concept was first introduced in a 1952 letter to the Journal of Mental Health by psychiatrist E. Wellisch. The term "genealogical bewilderment" was coined in 1964 by psychologist H. J. Sants, a colleague of Wellisch, referring to the plight of children who have uncertain, little, or no knowledge of one or both of their natural parents. Sants argued that genealogical bewilderment constituted a large part of the additional stress that adoptees experienced that is not experienced by children being raised by their natural parents.

In the 1970s, researchers Sorosky, Pannor and Baran drew upon the work of Sants to explore the concept in a number of publications, including a book titled The Adoption Triangle, thus bringing "genealogical bewilderment" to a larger audience.

== Supporting Arguments ==
1. Genealogy or genetic ancestry provides us with knowledge about ourselves, i.e., our heredity;
2. The knowledge about ourselves that a genealogy or genetic ancestry provides is knowledge of who we really are, i.e., our identity;
3. Normal psychological development requires knowledge of identity;
4. Normal psychological development requires knowledge of heredity.

Each of these arguments is supported by E. Wellisch in his 1952 letter to the Journal of Mental Health:

Knowledge of and definite relationship to his genealogy is ... necessary for a child to build up his complete body image and world picture. It is an inalienable and entitled right of every person. There is an urge, a call, in everybody to follow and fulfill the tradition of his family, race, nation, and the religious community into which he was born. The loss of this tradition is a deprivation which may result in the stunting of emotional development.

These arguments are further supported by adoptee's experience of abandonment, separation, and loss. They are no longer attached to their birth families, and so have lost a connection to their biological heritage. This loss can be considered as critical in infant adoptees, but is also seen more prominently in older adoptees. However, according to the "primal wound theory", separation from the mother results in a lack of mother-child bond and separation trauma.

== Family formation ==
There are three different styles of adoptive families that affect the development of adopted individuals. First, families that deny any differences between the biological family members and the adoptee. Second, families that insist on the differences between biological family members and the adoptee, going so far as to blame the adoptee's genetics, or life before adoption for any problems. These two families experience the most difficulties across the lifespan, including grappling with feelings of genealogical bewilderment. Finally, there are families who are open about the adoptive nature of their family, openly embracing differences. This type of family is most often the most successful in raising happy, well-adjusted children who do not experience feelings of genealogical bewilderment.

In older adoptees, as opposed to children who are adopted as infants or very young children, they have knowledge of their previous family system and their preadoptive history. These children often have the most trouble with family integration. If placed in the third type of family structure, these issues will often take care of themselves without outside intervention. If placed in either of the other two systems, integration is much more difficult; sometimes resulting in the adoption being disrupted or ended entirely.

There are researchers who disagree. If the quality of adoptive family relationships is sufficient to meet the child's emotional needs, knowledge of biological background should not equate good mental health; this in direct contrast to the concept of genealogical bewilderment. Adoptees with a need to search for their biological parents are often stigmatized as suffering from emotional deprivation as a result of poor relationships with their adoptive families. However, adoption reunion searches may stem from a variety of needs unrelated to the mental and emotional health and development of the adoptee. Among these may be the desire to reassert international citizenship rights as asserted and protected in the United Nations Charter on Human Rights; long-term health planning with respect to the advisability and utility of obtaining long-term biological family health histories; curiosity; and a sense of the personal and inalienable right to one's own identity, which begins with life.

== Identity conflicts ==
Some adoptees are concerned with a feeling of isolation and alienation from past generations; their adoption disrupts the continuity of generations that natural families have. This wall between the past and the present can create the perception that there is a wall between the present and the future as well. The feeling of genealogical bewilderment in these individuals is often seen as stronger during the adoptee's marriage, birth of children, and the deaths of the adoptive parents.

Adoptee identity formation is described as "ongoing resentment and immobilization stemming from a sense of powerlessness and disadvantage in relation to "regular" people; anxiety and ambivalence related to body-image, sexual relationships, and reproduction; and a driven need to experience human connectedness, described as a sense of not being really human or feeling real" as a result of not knowing their biological history.

If these children express feelings of grief as a result of their adoption or non-traditional conception, they fear they will be labeled as "ungrateful". They often feel estranged from their identities by not bearing a familial resemblance to their parents, further contributing to any feelings of genealogical bewilderment.

In older adoptees, they may have been a part of multiple family systems with vastly different dynamics and occupying different roles in each of those systems. In the biological family they may have been the oldest and the caregiver child; in the foster family they may have been the youngest and the foster child, in the adoptive family they might be in the middle and are also the adopted child. This constant change may also be compounded if the race or culture of the families they are placed with differ from their own. This upheaval contributes to the child's genealogical bewilderment by not allowing them to establish a concrete self-concept.

== Behavior problems ==
In infant adoptees, behavior problems can be seen as the child comes to fully understand what adoption means- that to be chosen by their adoptive parents, their biological parents had to relinquish them. This realization can result in acting out, a common coping mechanism for grief in young children. This grief continues to be significant as the child realizes that they have no access to their biological parents; this realization can grow into feelings of genealogical bewilderment.

A direct correlation has been established between the severity of behavioral problems with the age at which adoption occurs; adoptions that occur in later life with more extensive maternal deprivation have more difficulties growing up than other children. Researchers consider this maternal deprivation to disrupt the child's object relations, causing the difficulties.

Later childhood adoptees exhibiting behavioral problems are often expressions of unresolved internal emotional issues like the "fear of becoming attached, unresolved grief, a poor sense of identity, depression, and strong underlying feelings such as anger and fear related to past trauma."

== Adoptees and search/reunion issues ==
According to Jones (1997), identity development presents a challenge for adoptees, especially those in closed adoptions, and describes this "genetic bewilderment" as a logical consequence of a lack of immediate knowledge of their origins:

"[An issue] that surfaces repeatedly in an adoptee's life is that of identity. The development of an identity is a crucial building block for self-esteem, and an adoptee's struggle to achieve a coherent story is often a daunting task. The sense of continuity, of a past and present that is necessary for identity formation (Glen, 1985/1986) is defied in mandates governing closed adoption" (p. 66).

Levy-Shiff (2001, p. 102) elaborated based on findings from a study on adult adoptees:

"Whereas previous studies have documented adoption during childhood and adolescence, the findings of the present study suggest that during adulthood as well, adoptees are at a higher risk for psychological maladjustment. Thus they were found, on average, to have a less coherent and positive self-concept and to manifest more pathological symptomatology than did nonadoptees. ... It has been suggested (Sorosky et al., 1975; Verrier, 1987) that the difficulties in resolving a sense of coherent and positive self-identity is tied to four fundamental psychological issues: ... (4) confusion and uncertainty regarding genealogical continuity, tied to the lack of knowledge about one’s ancestors. Accordingly, the lack of ‘‘biological mutuality’’ among adoptive family members, such as shared biologically based characteristics regarding appearance, intellectual skills, personality traits, and so forth, impedes the adoptee’s ability to identify with adoptive parents. Moreover, the lack of information about one’s biological background is likely to create a ‘‘hereditary ghost’’ which may contribute to a confused, unstable, and distorted sense of self. It is possible that self development does not have closure in adolescence, especially among adoptees, but continues to evolve over the lifespan through reconciliation and integration of many complex perceptions, cognitive systems, and self-object representations. (p. 102)."

There is some debate about the contribution of genealogical bewilderment to adoption searches. On other hand, Storm (1988) in the Psychoanalytic Quarterly, summarizes Humphrey and Humphrey (1986) who state that:

The term genealogical bewilderment refers to a group of psychological problems stemming from lack of knowledge of one's ancestors. Adopted children and children conceived by artificial insemination from an anonymous donor are two examples of groups who may suffer from this problem. The literature is reviewed. Early papers suggested that not knowing about one's ancestors keeps one from developing a secure self-image. More recent work suggests that good surrogate family relationships lead to good development, regardless of the lack of information about biological ancestors, and that the drive to search out biological ancestors usually reflects poor relationships with the surrogate parents.

On the other hand, in a more recent article, Affleck and Steed (2001) state:

Dissatisfaction with adoptive parents was originally thought to be a motivating factor related to adoptees' searching (Sorosky, et al., 1975; Triseliotis, 1973). However, more recent research has found that the vast majority of adoptees who search have positive relationships with adoptive parents (Pacheco & Eme, 1993) or that the quality of adoptive relationships (either positive or negative) is not associated with a decision to search (Sachdev, 1993). ... In fact, the most common reasons for searching given by adoptees are related to four themes: "genealogical bewilderment" (adoptees' need for historical connection to resolve identity issues); a need for information, a need to reduce stigma, and a desire to assure the [natural parents] of the adoptees' wellbeing" (p. 38).

Genealogical bewilderment has mass social relevance based on the general acceptance of the term and its meaning.

Judith and Martin Land (2011) address genealogical bewilderment as an important psychological motive for doing an adoption search, Adoption Detective: Memoir of an Adopted Child, pages 270 and 275. The uncertain state of genealogical bewilderment is a source of stress, perhaps leaving adoptees more prone to rebellion because they have no roots or foundation from which to judge their potential. Discovery of genealogical roots is a path to understanding the true inner being and potential source of psychological grounding. Exposure of this topic to a wider audience is encouraged. "Genealogical bewilderment evokes a nefarious air of uncertainty and befuddles a child’s ability to establish their true self-identity." —Judith Land
