= Anthelme Mangin =

French soldier (1891–1942)

Anthelme Mangin (19 March 1891 – 10 September 1942), real name Octave Félicien Monjoin, was an amnesiac French veteran of the First World War who was the subject of a long judicial process involving dozens of families who claimed him as their missing relative. In 1938 he was determined to be the son of Pierre Monjoin and Joséphine Virly.

== After the war ==
On 1 February 1918, a French soldier was repatriated from Germany and arrived at the Gare des Brotteaux in Lyon, suffering from amnesia and lacking military or civil identification documents. When questioned, he gave a name that sounded something like Anthelme Mangin, and this became the name by which he is known to history. He was diagnosed with dementia praecox and placed in an asylum in Clermont-Ferrand.

In January 1920 Le Petit Parisien published a front-page feature with photos of several asylum patients, including Mangin, in the hope that their families would recognize them. The Mazenc family of Rodez claimed that he was their son and brother Albert, who disappeared in Tahure in 1915. He was therefore transferred to the asylum in Rodez and confronted with various pre-war friends and acquaintances, none of whom recognized him. Anthropological records revealed several differences between Albert Mazenc and Mangin, including a difference of 10 cm in height.

In 1922 the Ministry of Pensions published Mangin's photo in the hope of identifying him. Several dozen families responded to the photo. After a lengthy investigation by the psychiatrists at the Rodez asylum, only two claimants seemed plausible: Lucie Lemay, who claimed the man as her missing husband, and Pierre Monjoin, who claimed him as his son.

In 1934 Anthelme was taken on a visit to Saint-Maur, Indre, the home of Pierre Monjoin, and permitted to walk around the village. Starting at the railway station, Mangin walked unaccompanied to the Monjoin family home, though he did not acknowledge the old man. He noted the changed appearance of the village church, whose steeple had been struck by lightning during his absence. The authorities determined that he was Monjoin's son, but an appeal lodged by the Lemay family prolonged the case for some time.

The asylum tribunal ruled on the man's identity in 1938, and remanded him to the custody of his father and brother. However, by this time both had died. He therefore spent the rest of his life in the Sainte-Anne psychiatric hospital in Paris, where he died on 19 September 1942, apparently of malnutrition. He was buried in a common grave. In 1948 his remains were transferred to the cemetery of Saint-Maur-en-Indre and buried under the name Octave Monjoin.

== In popular culture ==
The story of Anthelme Mangin/Octave Monjoin inspired at least three works of fiction: Jean Giraudoux's Siegfried et le Limousin (1922), Jean Anouilh's Le Voyageur sans bagage (1937), and Anjet Daanje's The Remembered Soldier.

In 2004 Mangin was the subject of a TV documentary by Joël Calmettes titled Le Soldat inconnu vivant ("The Living Unknown Soldier").

Mangin was the subject of a 2016 episode of the Futility Closet Podcast.

== See also ==
- Elba Soccarras, unidentified woman found in 1994
- Unidentified decedent
