= Kenneth Alexander =

Ken, Kenny or Kenneth Alexander may refer to:

- Kenneth Alexander (photographer) (1887–1975), London-born American celebrity portraitist for film studios
- Sir Kenneth Alexander (economist) (1922–2001), Scottish academic and university administrator
- Ken Alexander (born 1953), American NASCAR driver
- Kenny Alexander (born 1966), American state legislator and mayor in Virginia
- Kenny Alexander (businessman) (born 1969), Scottish chief executive of GVC Holdings
