= Henry Pierce =

Henry Pierce may refer to:

- Henry L. Pierce (1825–1896), United States representative from Massachusetts
- Henry B. Pierce (1841–1898), Massachusetts insurance executive and politician
- Henry Niles Pierce (1820–1899), diocesan bishop of Arkansas in the Episcopal Church
- Henry Havelock Pierce (1864–1943), American portrait photographer
- Harry Pierce (1913–1975), Australian rugby league footballer

== See also ==
- Harry Pearce, a fictional character in the British television series Spooks
- Harry Pearce (baseball) (1889–1942), Major League Baseball second baseman
- Henry Pearce (disambiguation)
