= Kenneth Alexander (photographer) =

American photographer

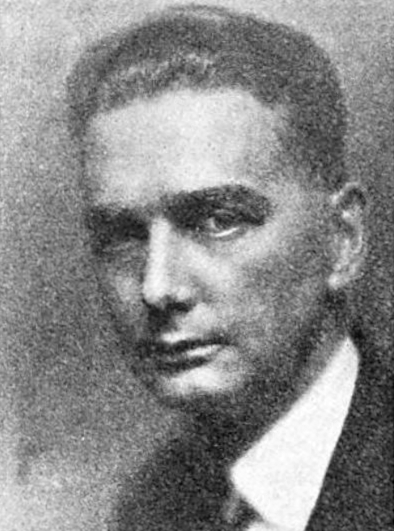
- Born: Alexander Kenneth Alexander; March 3, 1887; London, England
- Died: January 24, 1975 (aged 87)
- Occupation: Photographer

Kenneth Alexander (March 3, 1887 – January 24, 1975) was a photographer for United Artists, 20th Century Studios and Samuel Goldwyn Productions. He was known for his celebrity portraiture, photographing such stars as Marlene Dietrich, Lillian Gish, Betty Blythe, and Vilma Bánky.

== Early years ==
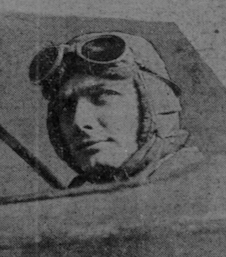
Alexander in the aero-photo service of the United States Navy, 1918

Kenneth Alexander (born Alexander Kenneth Alexander) was born in London on March 3, 1887, the son of Alexander Fyfe and Alice (née Austin). He was educated in England at Bedford Modern School. His family emigrated to New York in 1903 after which he studied art at the London Polytechnic and later at the New York School of Art.

== Career ==
Alexander was a student of photography with Vandyke as a London Court photographer after which he joined H. H. Pierce of Boston (1905–07). In America, Alexander's work became known nationally in 1907 when his photograph of the painter Arthur Wesley Dow won an award in the Third American Salon at the Toledo Museum of Art and was later included in The American Amateur Photographer.

In 1908 he joined Ernest Walter Histed in New York who specialised in low light dramatic portraiture. In 1910 he left Histed and operated a studio alone in Seattle, Washington, between 1910 and 1914, specialising in home portraiture. He became a US citizen in 1914 when he established a freelance studio in Honolulu, Hawaii, and became more widely known for celebrity portraiture.

During World War I he served in the aero-photo service of the United States Navy operating from a warship, taking close-ups and panoramas. Alexander later established himself as a photographer in New York with a tagline, "Photographer of Women Exclusively", a gender reversal of Pirie MacDonald's motto. He gained particular acclaim with United Artists during his time in New York assisting them and other film companies with offices in the city.

After New York, Alexander moved to Los Angeles at the behest of Lillian Gish, who wanted him as a photographer on her film La Bohème. Alexander eventually settled in Hollywood, where he was employed by Sam Goldwyn Productions throughout the 1930s.

== Filmography ==
- 1931 – Street Scene (still photographer)
- 1932 – The Greeks Had a Word for Them (still photographer)
- 1933 – The Bowery (still photographer)
- 1933 – Roman Scandals (still photographer)
- 1934 – Bulldog Drummond Strikes Back (still photographer)
- 1934 – The Mighty Barnum (still photographer)
- 1935 – The Call of the Wild (still photographer)
- 1935 – Clive of India (still photographer)

== Gallery ==
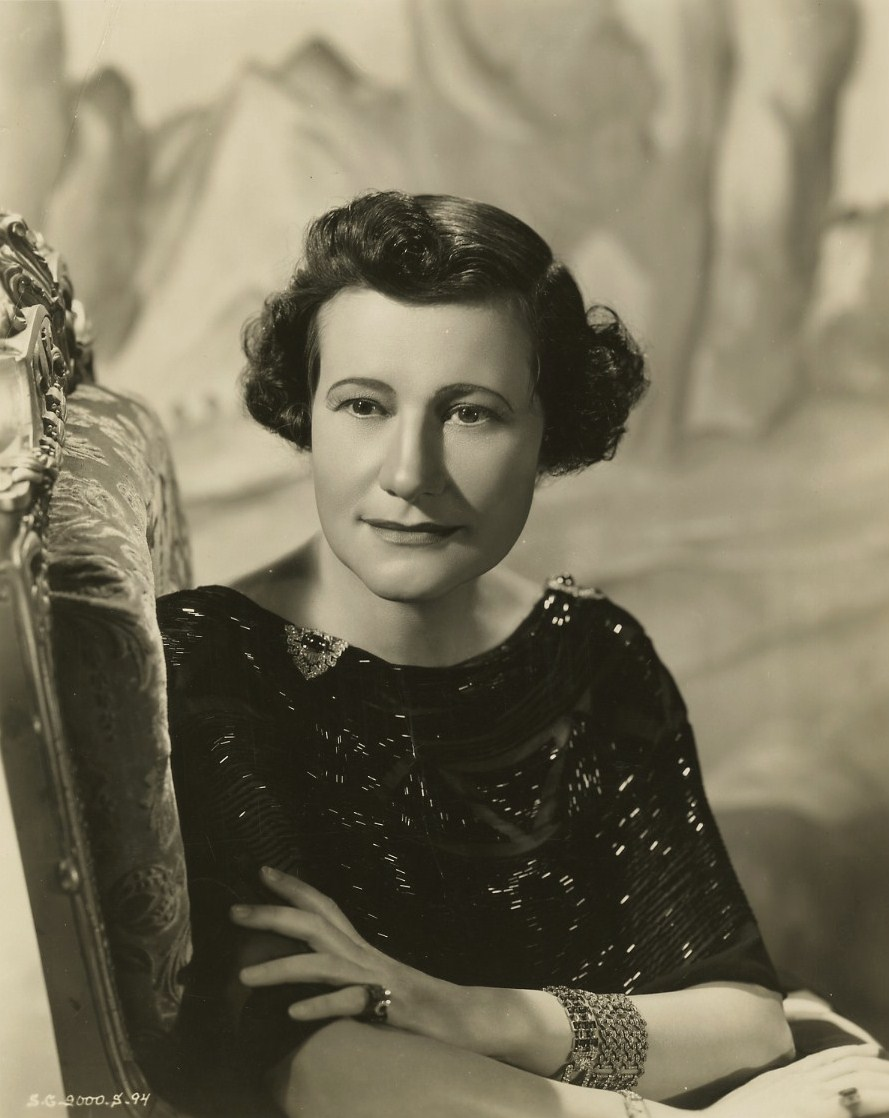
Odette Myrtil, 1943

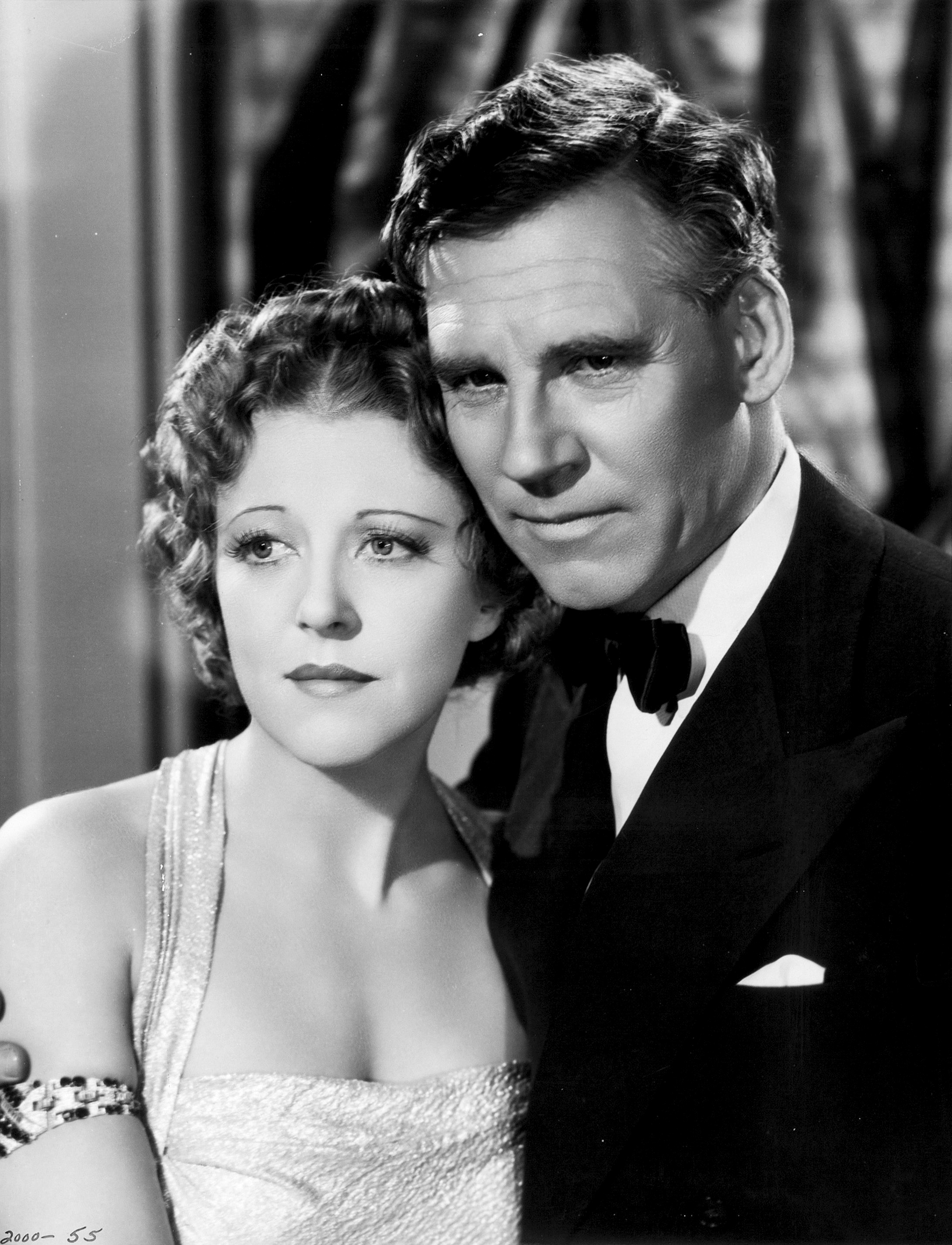
Walter Huston and Ruth Chatterton, 1935

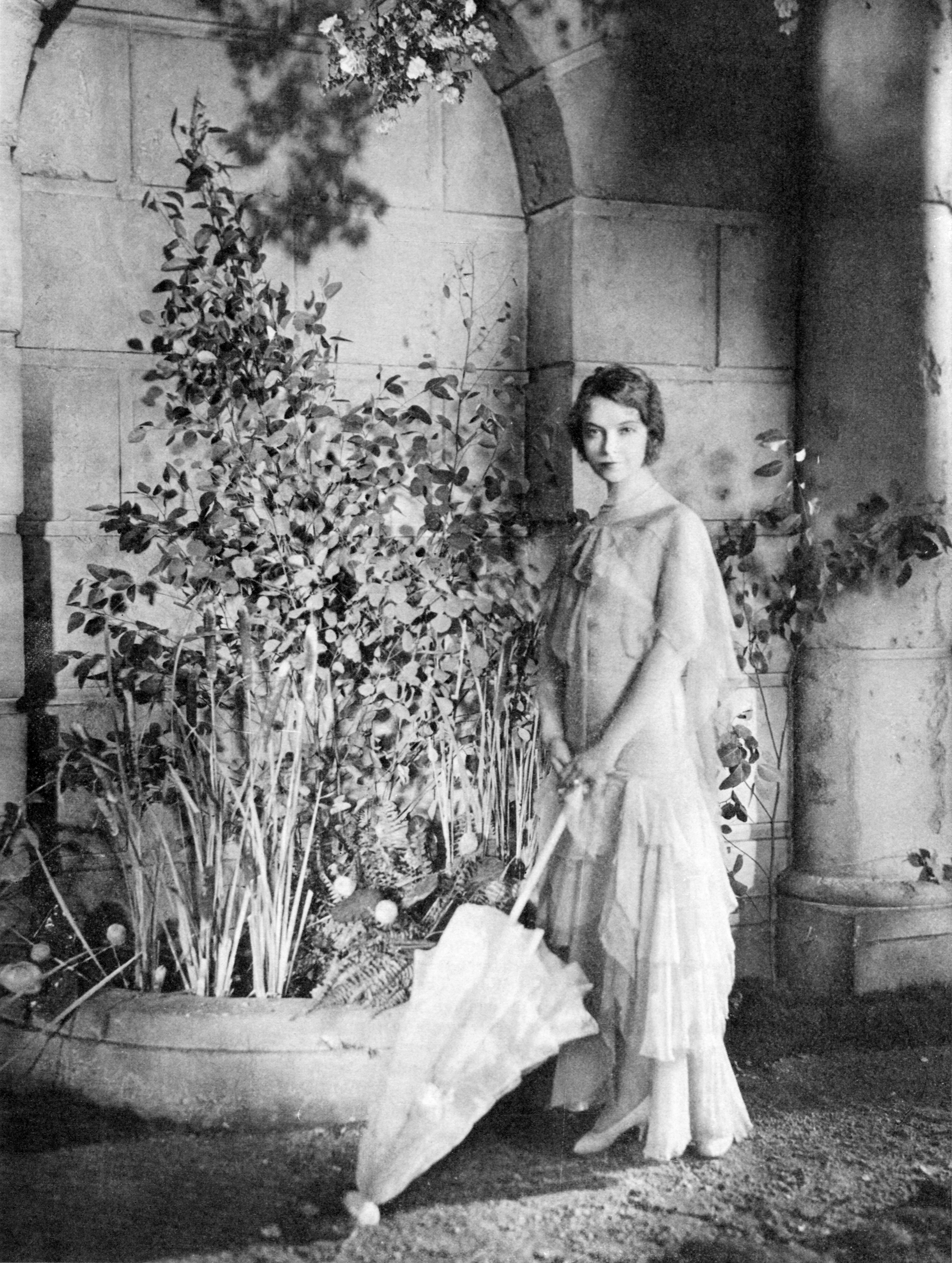
Lillian Gish, 1930

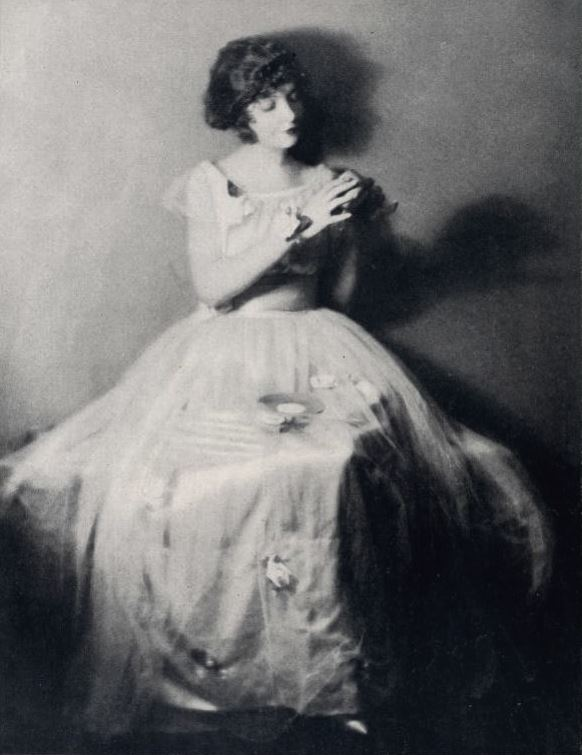
Lillian Gish, 1923

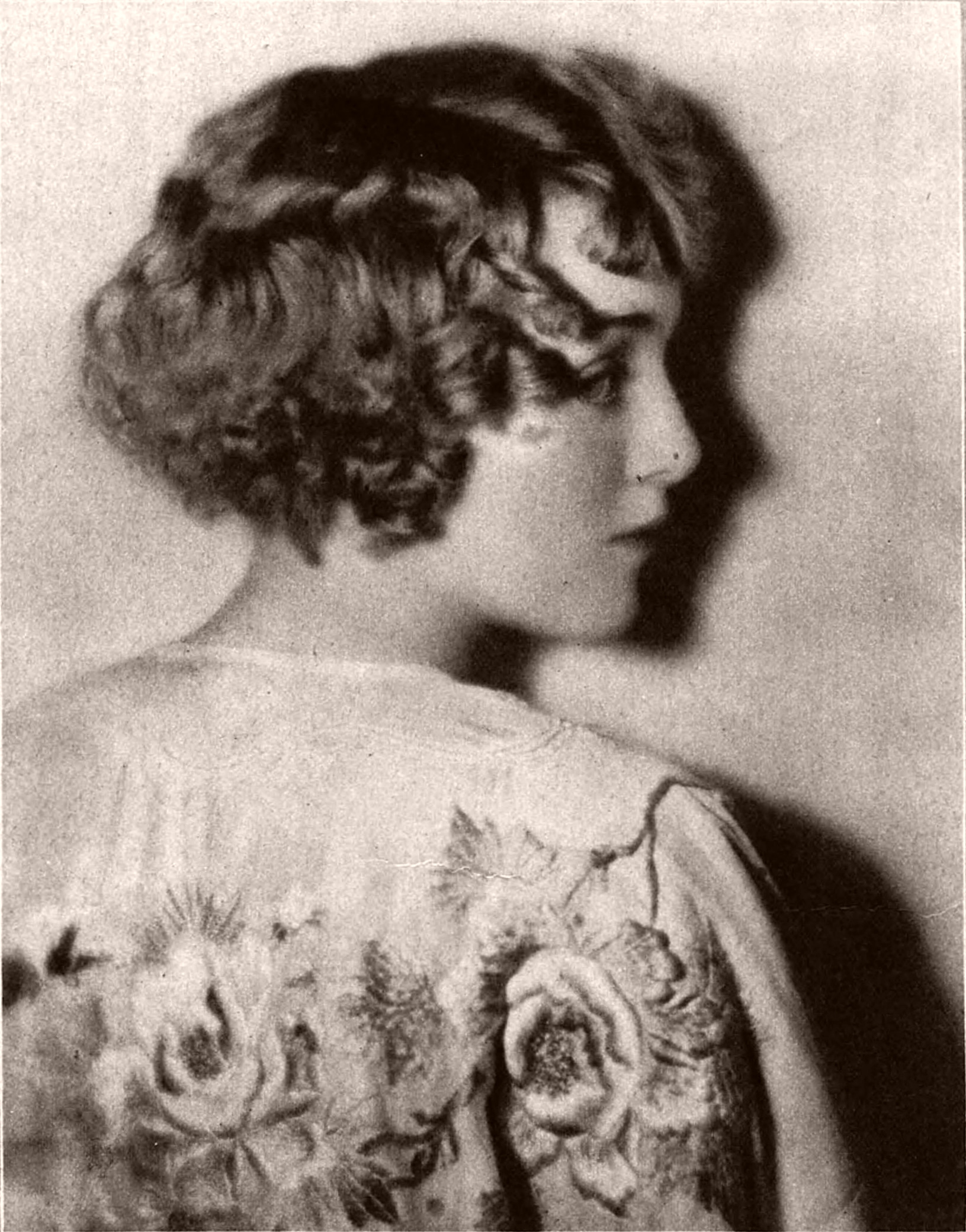
Mildred Davis, 1922

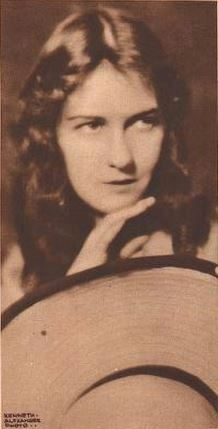
Dorothy Gish, 1922
