= Henry Pearce =

Henry Pearce may refer to:

- Henry Pearce (cricketer) (1886–1936), American cricketer
- George Pearce (Queensland politician) (Henry George Pearce, 1917–1992), Australian politician
- Bobby Pearce (rower) (Henry Robert Pearce, 1905–1976), Australian Olympic gold medalist rower
- Hen Pearce (1777–1809), boxer

== See also ==
- Henry Pierce (disambiguation)
