= Henry Havelock Pierce =

American photographer (1864–1943)

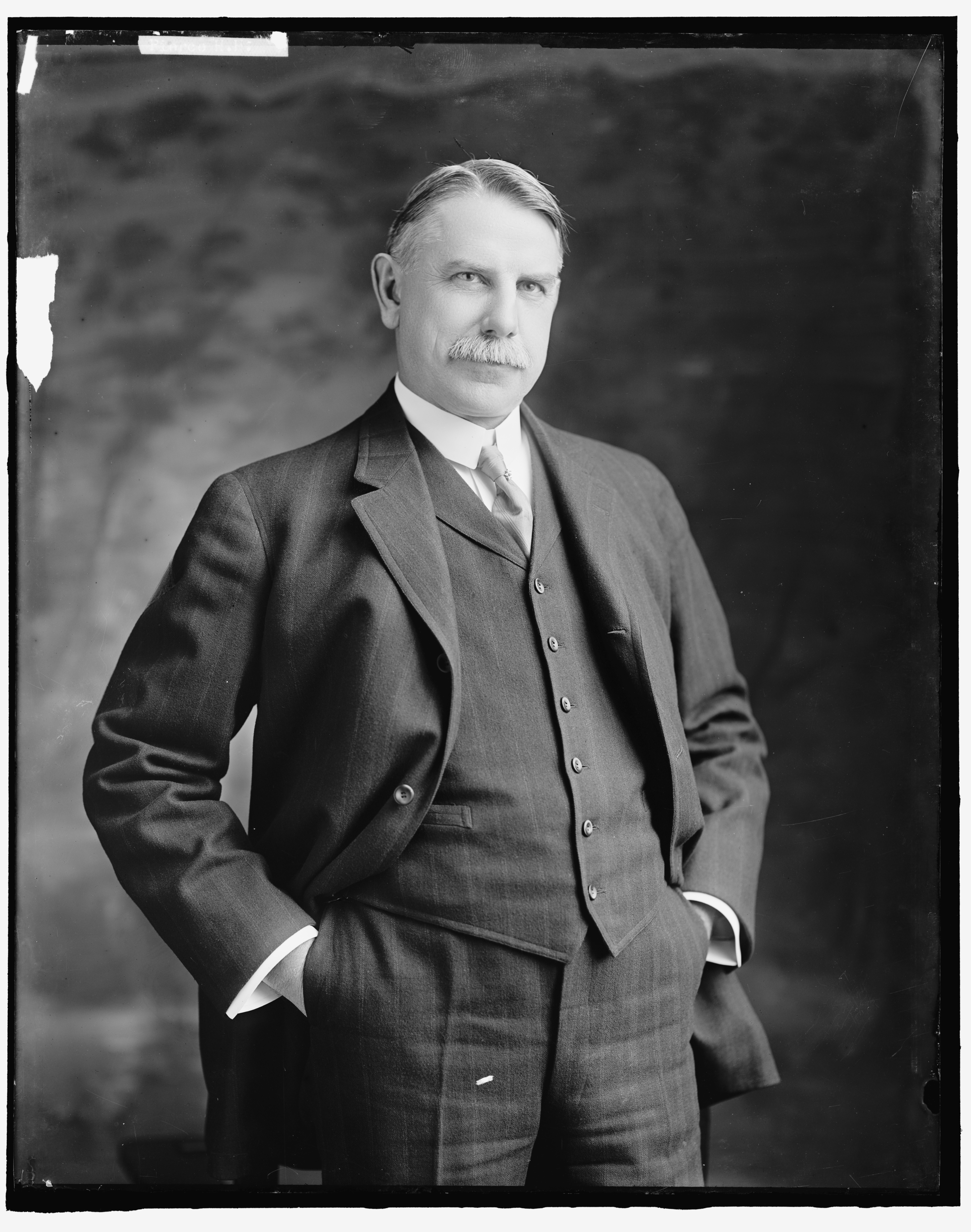
H. H. Pierce by Harris & Ewing, between 1905 and 1945

Henry Havelock Pierce (May 7, 1864 - November 20, 1943), also known as H. H. Pierce, was a noted American portrait photographer once celebrated for his society portraits.

Pierce was born in Margaretsville, Nova Scotia. After his family moved to Cambridge, Massachusetts, at the age of 17 he apprenticed at William Notman's Harvard studio, then worked at Boston's McCormick & Heald gallery located at 22 Winter Street. In September 1886 he became manager of the Heald studio in Providence, Rhode Island, where he opened his own studio a few years later. Later he had studios in Boston, Manchester-by-the-Sea, and New York City, but in addition travelled extensively to make his portraits.

Pierce was an innovator in portrait lighting, using both direct sunlight and stand-alone lights, screens, and reflectors to disperse lighting and bring out subtle shadows. In 1900 he served as president of the Photographic Club of New England, and in 1904 was the only American photographer to receive a medal at the Royal Photographic Society's London exhibition.

Pierce's portraits range from Calvin Coolidge and Alice Roosevelt Longworth to John Singer Sargent and Henry Clay Frick.

== Books ==
- At Home Portraits, by Henry Havelock Pierce, 1905
