= Ernest Walter Histed =

English-American photographer (1863–1947)

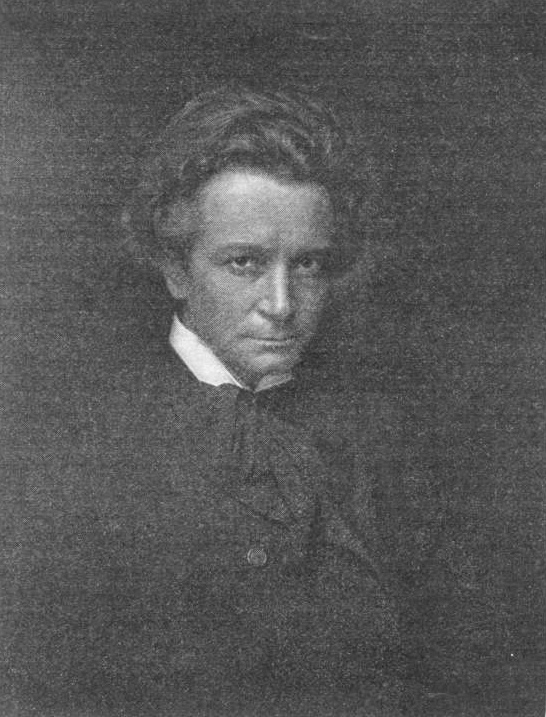
- Born: December 1863; Brighton, England
- Died: 27 May 1947 (aged 83); Jupiter, Florida, United States
- Known for: Portrait photography
- Notable work: Portraits of notable figures including H. Rider Haggard, Clara Butt, Pope Pius X
- Spouse: Lena Belle Simpson (m. 1908)
- Children: 2
- Patrons: Queen Victoria

Ernest Walter Histed (December 1863 – 27 May 1947) was an English-American photographer.

== Early life ==
Histed was born in Brighton in December 1863.

== Career ==
Histed went to United States and created a successful business in Chicago, and then in Pittsburgh. He returned to England to set up a studio first in New Bond Street and then in Baker Street, London. In 1898 he made portraits of H. Rider Haggard, Clara Butt and the Empress of Germany, the last by command of Queen Victoria at Windsor Castle. He also photographed Royal Academicians, leading actors for The Candid Friend and Pope Pius X. Then he returned to New York, and operated a studio on Fifth Avenue. He moved to Palm Beach, Florida and continued to work until 1934. The largest collection of his work is held by the Museum of the City of New York.

== Personal life and death ==
In 1906, he married Lena Belle Simpson. They had two children.

After the 1933 social season, Histed retired and relocated to a 200-acre farm in Jupiter, Florida, situated on the Loxahatchee River.

Histed died there on 27 May 1947.
