= John Nichols (Worcestershire cricketer) =

English cricketer

Personal information
- Full name: John Ernest Nichols
- Born: 20 April 1878; Acle, Norfolk
- Died: 29 February 1952 (aged 73); Thorpe Hamlet, Norwich, Norfolk

Domestic team information
- Years: Team
- 1898: Norfolk
- 1902–1904: Worcestershire
- 1907–1914: Staffordshire
- 1921–1931: Norfolk
- FC debut: 21 July 1902 Worcestershire v Sussex
- Last FC: 29 July 1912 Minor Counties v South Africans

Career statistics
Competition	First-class
Matches	6
Runs scored	45
Batting average	5.00
100s/50s	0/0
Top score	13
Balls bowled	48
Wickets	0
Bowling average	–
5 wickets in innings	–
10 wickets in match	–
Best bowling	–
Catches/stumpings	3/–
- Source: Cricinfo, 8 November 2022

John Ernest Nichols (20 April 1878 – 29 February 1952), sometimes known as Jack Nichols, was an English professional sportsman who played cricket and association football. As a first-class cricketer he played five matches for Worcestershire County Cricket Club between 1902 and 1904, as well as making one first-class appearance for a Minor Counties representative team in 1912. He also played Minor Counties Championship cricket for Norfolk and Staffordshire County Cricket Clubs and was an influential cricket coach.

As a footballer, Nichols spent time contracted by Bolton Wanderers and Bury and played professionally at Football League Second Division level for Loughborough F.C. He served in the British Army during World War I.

== Early life ==
Nichols was born at Acle in Norfolk in 1878 and was brought up at Wymondham, where his father, also John, was a publican and the groundsman of the town's sports ground, Kings Head Meadow. He played cricket for the town's cricket club and is first known to have played for Norfolk in 1898, appearing in two Minor Counties Championship matches as well as a match against Yorkshire's Second XI.

== Football career ==
Nichols played football for the amateur Norfolk County F.A. team before joining Bolton Wanderers in 1896, although he did not play a first-team match for the team. He played for Loughborough in 1898–99, making his debut in an FA Cup tie against Mansfield Town in October 1898 and his league debut later in the same month in a Second Division fixture against Blackpool. He played a total of 13 matches for the team, scoring three goals, before joining amateur team Loughborough Corinthians in January 1899.

Nichols spent the following season contracted at Bury but did not play a competitive match for the team. It is possible that his football career was curtailed after breaking his leg.

== Pre-war cricket ==
After spending time on the playing staff at Lancashire in 1898, Nichols made his first-class debut for Worcestershire in a County Championship match against Sussex at New Road, Worcester in July 1902, scoring seven runs and not taking a wicket in his four overs.

Before making his Worcestershire debut, Nichols had played at Stourbridge Cricket Club since 1900 and for Worcestershire Club and Ground from 1901. (Note: Club and Ground teams consisted of players who were on the playing staff for the county team, so Nichols would likely have held a professional contract as early as 1901.) He had also played for the county's Second XI earlier in 1902. Three first-class appearances in 1903, including opening the batting in two matches, saw him score a total of 19 runs during the season. He made his final appearance for Worcestershire the following season, making his highest first-class score of 13 against Yorkshire at Sheffield.

By 1907 Nichols was playing Minor Counties cricket for Staffordshire where he "had considerable success" in the years before World War I. He appeared regularly for the team from 1909 until the war, playing in 69 Minor Counties Championship matches, scoring two centuries and taking wickets each season. In 1912 he was selected for the Minor Counties representative team to play against the touring South Africans in a first-class match at County Ground, Stoke-on-Trent, scoring six runs―his final first-class appearance. (Note: This was the first time a Minor Counties representative team had played a first-class match. The team played a total of 45 first-class matches, generally against touring international teams, with the final match taking place in 1994.) In his six first-class appearances he scored a total of 45 runs and did not take a wicket.

== Military service ==
Nichols enlisted in November 1914 and served in the 2/8th (Liverpool Irish) Battalion of the King's (Liverpool Regiment). He rose to the rank of Company Sergeant Major and was discharged in April 1918, invalided out of the service.

== Later cricket career ==
Following the war he became a cricket coach. Michael Falcon, Norfolk's captain and dominant player of the era, identified Nichols whilst he was coaching at Bishop's Stortford College. Nichols was recruited by Falcon, and from 1921 until 1931 he played regular Minor Counties cricket for Norfolk, becoming the county's professional. (Note: Norfolk normally employed a professional cricket on a paid contract to play for and coach the team. Nichols was not always the only professional employed by the team at the time.) The Norfolk team of the time was considered strong enough by The Cricketer to be close to first-class standard, (Note: Discussions were held about elevating Norfolk to the County Championship―the major first-class cricket competition in England. The county club decided not to pursue first-class status, although opinions were divided about whether to do so. During the 1920s, Pelham Warner, an influential figure in the organisation of cricket in the country, suggested a plan whereby either Norfolk or Buckinghamshire might be added to the Championship.) and Nichols was an important element of the team: in 1922 he took 39 wickets and scored 433 runs as Norfolk finished runners-up in the Minor Counties Championship, narrowly losing the final challenge match of the season to Buckinghamshire at the County Ground, Lakenham in Norwich. (Note: Because not every team played each other, the two teams which finished top of the Minor Counties Championship table played a single challenge match to determine the Minor Counties Champion. Norfolk headed the table, but lost the challenge match by eight runs.) As one of the Norfolk team's most talented cricketers he had to play as a wicket-keeper at times as none of the county's other players were capable of keeping wickets effectively to the bowling of Falcon, an extremely fast bowler at Minor County level, even at this stage in his career.

Nichols remained a mainstay of the county team throughout the 1920s. He scored 533 runs and took 28 wickets in 1925, including his only century for the team―a score of 127 against Staffordshire, made at the age of 47. He played into his fifties, making his final Minor Counties appearances for the team in 1931 before retiring as a player. He continued to coach the team until 1938, and in 1932 took a Norfolk team to play a match against Wymondham, his first club team. In 100 Minor Counties Championship matches for Norfolk he scored 3,263 runs at a batting average of 24.35 runs per innings and took 224 wickets at a bowling average of 19.55 runs per wicket. (Note: The figures given by CricketArchive vary slightly from those provided by Hounsome who used Norfolk's own records in determining statistical figures.) In 1927 he returned a bowling analysis of seven wickets for 14 runs from 12.2 overs against Leicestershire Second XI. Nichols also played for Norfolk in tour matches against the West Indies in 1923 and 1928, the New Zealanders in 1927―scoring a half-century at the age of 49―and the South Africans in 1929.

As well as coaching the Norfolk team, Nichols worked as a cricket coach at Bracondale School, a small private school in Norwich. The Edrich brothers attended the school, (Note: Five of the contemporary Edrich family played cricket at first-class level: brothers Brian, Eric, Geoff and Bill as well as their slightly younger cousin John. All were educated at Bracondale. Bill and John played Test cricket for England.) and Nichols was involved in their coaching. He was described in Geoff Edrich's obituary as an "exceptional cricket coach" and was considered influential, along with Michael Falcon, in developing the career of Bill Edrich. (Note: Bill Edrich made his Norfolk debut in 1932 aged only 16. He went on to play 39 Test matches for the England cricket team and 571 first-class matches, most of them for Middlesex.)

Nichols stood in one first-class match as an umpire, the 1924 fixture between Minor Counties―although the team was selected by Norfolk and included seven of the county's players―and the touring South Africans played at Lakenham. He also umpired in Norfolk matches during the period after his retirement.

Nichols died at the age of 73 at Thorpe Hamlet in Norwich in February 1952. (Note: Both CricInfo and CricketArchive give Thorpe, Norwich as Nichols' place of death. This could be Thorpe Hamlet or Thorpe St Andrew. At the time Thrope St Andrew was separated from Norwich and considered a village, so Thorpe Hamlet has been considered the more likely location. The two places border each other.)
