= Edrich =

Edrich is a surname. Notable people with the surname include:

- Bill Edrich (1916–1986), English cricketer, Middlesex and England batsman
- Brian Edrich (1922–2009), English cricketer, Kent and Glamorgan batsman
- Eric Edrich (1914–1993), English cricketer, Lancashire wicket-keeper
- Geoff Edrich (1918–2004), English cricketer, Lancashire batsman
- John Edrich (1937–2020), English cricketer, Surrey and England batsman
- Justin Edrich (born 1961), English cricketer, Suffolk batsman
