= Erdrich =

Erdrich is a surname. Notable people with the surname include:

- Heid E. Erdrich (born 1963), Native American poet
- Louise Erdrich (born 1954), American author

== See also ==
- Edrich
