= Lingwood and Burlingham =

Civil parish in the English county of Norfolk

Coordinates: 52.625°N 1.491°E

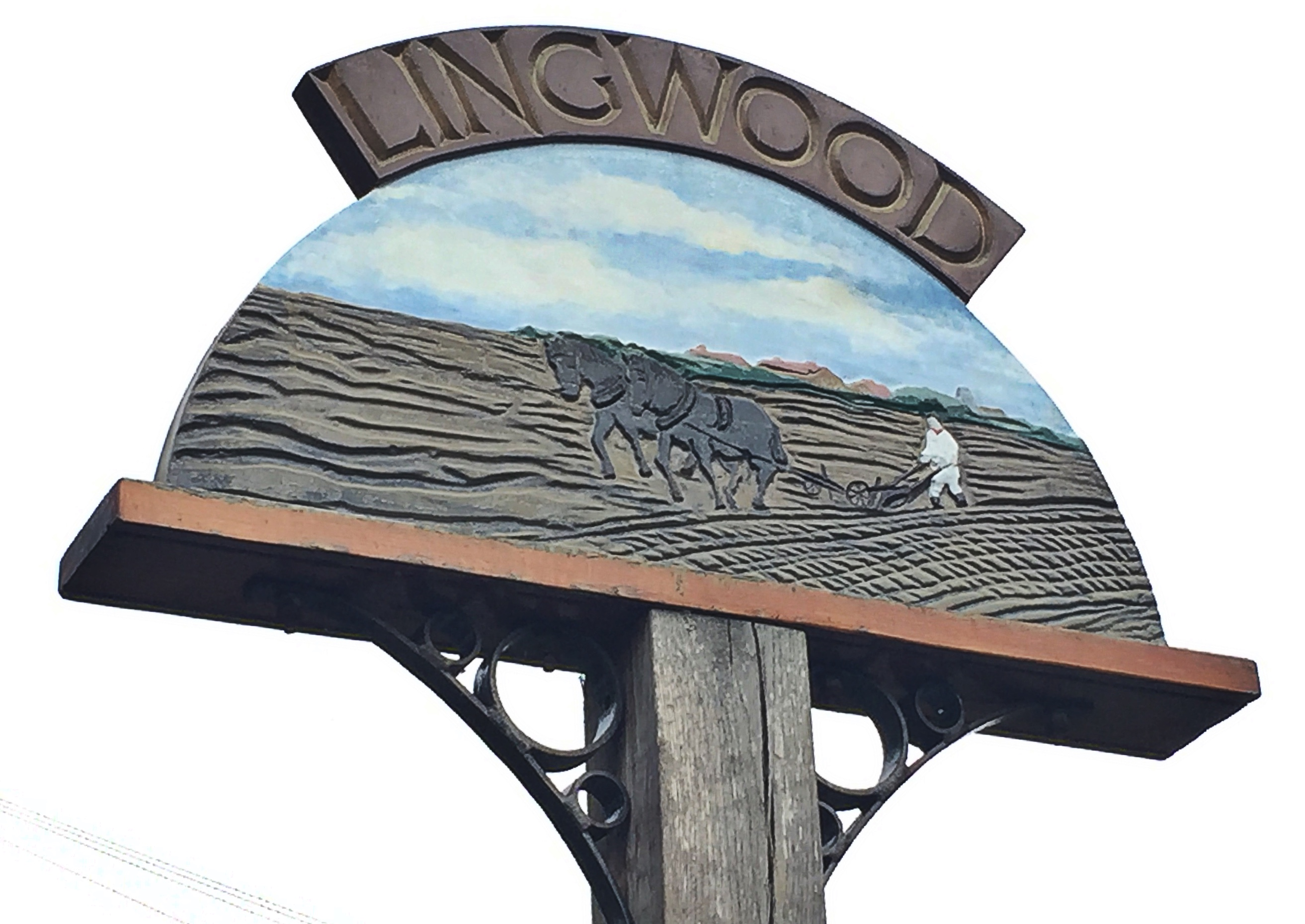

- Location within Norfolk
- Area: 9.39 km^{2} (3.63 sq mi)
- Population: 2,643 (2011)
  - Density: 281/km^{2} (730/sq mi)
- OS grid reference: TG 363 087
- Civil parish: Lingwood and Burlingham
- District: Broadland
- Shire county: Norfolk
- Region: East
- Country: England
- Sovereign state: United Kingdom
- Post town: NORWICH
- Postcode district: NR13
- Dialling code: 01603
- Police: Norfolk
- Fire: Norfolk
- Ambulance: East of England
- UK Parliament: Broadland and Fakenham

Lingwood and Burlingham is a civil parish in the English county of Norfolk, comprising the village of Lingwood and the smaller settlements of Burlingham Green, North Burlingham, and South Burlingham. The settlements are within 4 kilometres (2.5 mi) of each other, about 15 kilometres (9.3 mi) west of Great Yarmouth and the same distance east of Norwich. The A47 road runs through the parish.

The civil parish was created in 1935, by the merger of the parishes of Lingwood, Burlingham St Andrew, Burlingham St Edmond and Burlingham St Peter. It has an area of 9.39 square kilometres (3.63 sq mi) and in the 2001 census had a population of 2,504 in 1,047 households, increasing to a population of 2,643 in 1,131 households at the 2011 Census. For the purposes of local government, the parish falls within the district of Broadland.

Lingwood is served by Lingwood railway station on the Norwich-Great Yarmouth Wherry Line.

Burlingham House is a Georgian Grade II listed manor house, the former seat of the Jary family, and is now a care home. Burlingham Hall (now demolished) was the seat of the Burroughes family, bought with 3500 acres in 1919 by Norfolk County Council as part of its farming estate.

== Notable residents ==
- Catherine Blaiklock, founder of the Brexit Party, and former UKIP Economic Spokesperson
