= Lerski =

Lerski is a surname. Notable people with the surname include:

- Helmar Lerski (1871–1956), Swiss photographer
- Holly Lerski (born 1969), English singer-songwriter
- Jerzy Jan Lerski (1917-1992), Polish lawyer, soldier, historian, and politician
