= Bill Edrich =

English cricketer

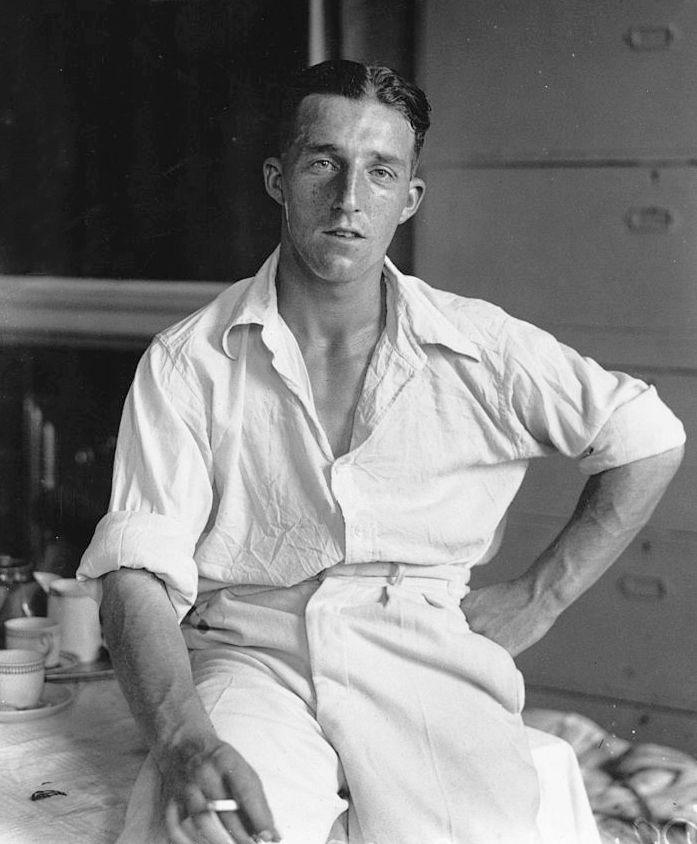
- Edrich in 1937

Personal information
- Full name: William John Edrich
- Born: 26 March 1916; Lingwood, Norfolk, England
- Died: 24 April 1986 (aged 70); Whitehill Court, Chesham, Buckinghamshire, England
- Height: 5 ft 6 in (168 cm)
- Batting: Right-handed
- Bowling: Right-arm off-break Right-arm fast-medium
- Role: Batsman
- Relatives: Brian Edrich (brother); Eric Edrich (brother); Geoff Edrich (brother); John Edrich (cousin); Justin Edrich (son)

International information
- National side: England
- Test debut (cap 300): 10 June 1938 v Australia
- Last Test: 28 January 1955 v Australia

Domestic team information
- Years: Team
- 1932–1936: Norfolk
- 1934–1936: Minor Counties
- 1934–1958: MCC
- 1937–1958: Middlesex
- 1959–1971: Norfolk

Career statistics
Competition	Test	FC	LA
Matches	39	571	4
Runs scored	2,440	36,965	48
Batting average	40.00	42.39	12.00
100s/50s	6/13	86/199	0/0
Top score	219*	267*	36
Balls bowled	3,234	32,950	70
Wickets	41	479	2
Bowling average	41.29	33.31	38.00
5 wickets in innings	0	11	0
10 wickets in match	0	3	0
Best bowling	4/68	7/48	2/76
Catches/stumpings	39/–	527/1	1/–
- Source: CricketArchive, 17 September 2009

William John Edrich DFC (26 March 1916 – 24 April 1986) was a first-class cricketer who played for Middlesex, Marylebone Cricket Club (MCC), Norfolk and England.

Edrich's three brothers, Brian, Eric and Geoff, and also his cousin, John, all played first-class cricket. Locally in Norfolk the Edriches were able to raise a full team of eleven. In 1938 a team composed entirely of Edriches beat Norfolk in a one-day match.

== Life and career ==
Born in Lingwood, Norfolk, Bill Edrich was an attacking right-handed batsman and right-arm fast bowler. Playing first for Norfolk in the Minor Counties at the age of 16, he qualified for Middlesex in 1937 and was an instant success, scoring more than 2,000 runs in his first full season. The following year, 1938, he scored 1,000 runs before the end of May and made the first of 39 Test match appearances, though with little success. In fact, Edrich achieved almost nothing in Tests until the final "Timeless Test" of the 1938–39 tour to South Africa at Durban, where his 219 enabled England to reach 654 for five wickets, at which point the Test was left drawn to enable the tourists to catch their ship home.

Having finally achieved Test match success, Edrich was promptly dropped for the 1939 series against the West Indians. Even so, he was a Wisden Cricketer of the Year in the 1940 edition of Wisden. Edrich played association football as an amateur for Norwich City and Tottenham Hotspur during the 1930s.

At the outbreak of war Edrich joined the Royal Air Force, in which he attained the rank of Squadron Leader, operating as a pilot for RAF Bomber Command. On 12 August 1941 he participated in a low-level daylight attack by Bristol Blenheim bombers against power stations in the Cologne area, described by The Daily Telegraph as "the RAF's most audacious and dangerous low-level bombing raid". Of the 54 Blenheims sent on the mission, twelve were shot down. For his part in the war he was awarded the DFC. He had "an immense relief that he survived" the war and as a result loved to party and lived for the day.

When cricket resumed after the Second World War, he quickly became a regular in the England team, batting at No. 3 and sometimes opening the bowling. He scored centuries against Australia in the 1946–47 Ashes series, two against the South Africans in 1947, another against Australia in 1948 and a final one against New Zealand in 1949. A gutsy batsman he was "almost indifferent to his own safety. No bowler is too fast to hook; no score too large to defy challenge" and was badly bruised standing up to the bouncers of Lindwall and Miller in 1946–47 and 1948.

The postwar years were Edrich's heyday and in 1947 he broke Tom Hayward's record, scoring 3,539 runs in the season and not being much overshadowed by Denis Compton, who scored 3,816. Compton's and Edrich's aggregates remain the highest ever in an English cricket season, and with the reduction in the number of first-class matches seem likely never to be overtaken. In addition to his runs, Edrich also took 67 wickets in the same season.

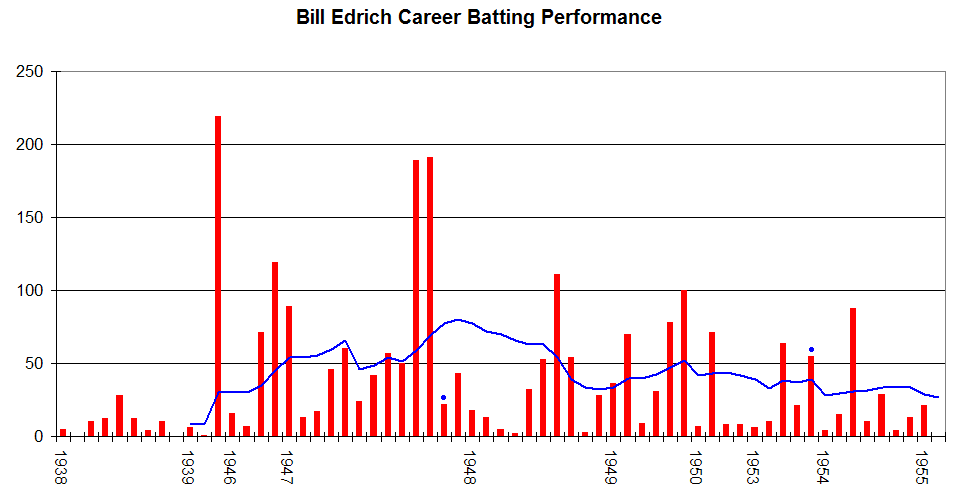
Bill Edrich's career performance graph.

Edrich's Test career continued until The Ashes tour of 1954–55, but he played less regularly after 1950, when he appeared to have little answer to the West Indian spinners Sonny Ramadhin and Alf Valentine. When England retained the Ashes at Adelaide in 1954–55 the team consumed over 56 bottles of champagne and Edrich – the life and soul of any party – climbed the marble pillar in the lounge of Glenelg's Pier Hotel and sang "Ginger".

All told, Edrich played in 571 first-class matches between 1934 and 1958, scoring 36,985 runs, with a highest score of 267 not out. His run total puts him 29th on the all-time lists. He scored 2,440 runs for England in his 39 Test matches, with the 219 not out at Durban his best. A professional before the Second World War, he turned amateur afterwards and captained Middlesex jointly with Compton in 1951 and 1952, continuing in sole charge from 1953 to 1957. After retiring from Middlesex, he returned to Norfolk and played Minor County cricket until he was 56, captaining the county until 1971.

A famously convivial man, Edrich was married five times and had two sons, Jasper and Justin. He died following a fall at his Chesham, Buckinghamshire home on 24 April 1986, aged 70. The MCC named the twin stands at the Nursery End at Lord's Cricket Ground, in his and Denis Compton's honour. Cricket writer, Colin Bateman, noted, "it is a dull, practical structure which does little justice to their mercurial talents and indomitable spirits". The twin stands were completely rebuilt to a much more attractive and fitting design and were opened in 2021.

== Bibliography ==
=== Books by Bill Edrich ===
- Cricket Heritage, Stanley Paul, 1948
- Cricketing Days, Stanley Paul, 1950
- Round the Wicket, Muller, 1959
- Cricket and All That, Pelham, 1978 (with Denis Compton)

=== Books about Bill Edrich ===
- Ralph Barker, The Cricketing Family Edrich, Pelham, 1976
- Alan Hill, Bill Edrich: A Biography, Andre Deutsch, 1994
- Jerry Lodge, Bill Edrich, Association of Cricket Statisticians and Historians, 2003
- Leo McKinstry, Bill Edrich: The Many Lives Of England's Cricketing Great, Bloomsbury, 2024

Sporting positions
Preceded by Walter Robins	Middlesex County Cricket Captain; 1951–1957 (jointly with Denis Compton 1951–2)	Succeeded by John Warr
