= County Ground, Lakenham =

Former cricket ground in Norwich, England

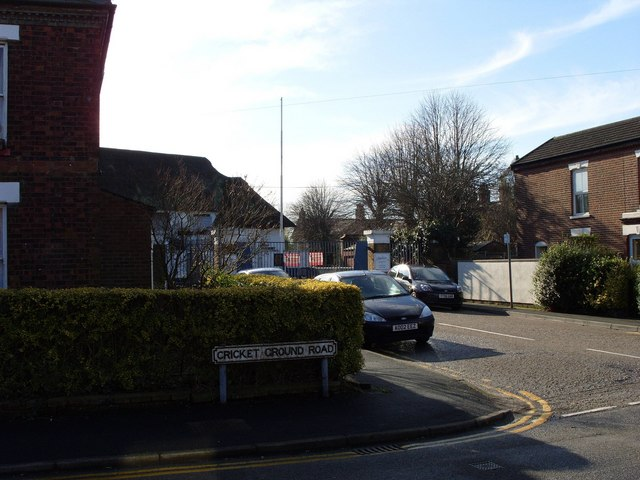
- Entrance to the former County Ground, with the thatched pavilion beyond the gates
- Interactive map of County Ground, Lakenham

Ground information
- Location: Norwich, Norfolk
- Country: England
- Coordinates: 52.616°N 1.302°E
- Establishment: 1827
- Demolished: 2015
- Last used: 2000

Team information
Norfolk County Cricket Club	(1879–2000)
- As of 10 April 2025; Source: CricketArchive

The County Ground at Lakenham in Norwich was a cricket ground for almost two hundred years, hosting both first-class and List A cricket. It was established in 1827 on land owned by Colman's, and was initially leased by the Norwich club.

Five first-class games, all involving touring international teams, were played on the ground between 1912 and 1986, and 13 List A matches were staged between 1969 and 1998. The County Ground's most regular users were Norfolk County Cricket Club, who played over 400 Minor Counties Championship games at the venue. In the early 21st century the ground was redeveloped for a variety of other uses.

== Records ==
=== First-class ===
- Highest team total: 425/5 declared by West Indians v Minor Counties, 1950
- Lowest team total: 79 by England XI v Australians, 1912
- Highest individual innings: 117 by Gerry Gomez for West Indians v Minor Counties, 1950
- Best bowling in an innings: 7/33 by Sonny Ramadhin for West Indians v Minor Counties, 1950
- Best bowling in a match: 9/106 by Evan Gray for New Zealanders v Minor Counties, 1986

=== List A ===
- Highest team total: 309 by Worcestershire v Norfolk, 1994
- Lowest team total: 52 (26.5 overs) by Minor Counties v Lancashire, 1998
- Highest individual innings: 138 by Chris Adams for Derbyshire v Minor Counties, 1997
- Best bowling in an innings: 6/48 by Tracey Moore for Norfolk v Yorkshire, 1969

== Bibliography ==
- Hounsome K (2015) A Game Well Played: a history of cricket in Norfolk. Norwich: Hounsome. ISBN 978-0-9932296-0-2
