= Brian Edrich =

English cricketer

Personal information
- Full name: Brian Robert Edrich
- Born: 18 August 1922; Cantley, Norfolk
- Died: 31 May 2009 (aged 86); Padstow, Cornwall
- Batting: Left-handed
- Bowling: Right-arm off break
- Role: Batsman
- Relatives: Bill Edrich (brother); Eric Edrich (brother); Geoff Edrich (brother); John Edrich (cousin); Justin Edrich (nephew)

Domestic team information
- Years: Team
- 1947–1953: Kent
- 1954–1956: Glamorgan
- 1966–1971: Oxfordshire
- FC debut: 10 May 1947 Kent v Lancashire
- Last FC: 19 July 1967 Minor Counties v Pakistanis
- LA debut: 3 May 1967 Oxfordshire v Cambridgeshire
- Last LA: 25 April 1970 Oxfordshire v Worcestershire

Career statistics
Competition	First-class	List A
Matches	181	2
Runs scored	5,529	34
Batting average	19.96	17.00
100s/50s	4/17	0/0
Top score	193*	34
Balls bowled	9,347	0
Wickets	137	–
Bowling average	33.18	–
5 wickets in innings	4	–
10 wickets in match	0	–
Best bowling	7/41	–
Catches/stumpings	130/–	0/–
- Source: CricInfo, 4 June 2017

Brian Robert Edrich (18 August 1922 – 31 May 2009) was an English cricketer who played first-class cricket for Kent and Glamorgan between 1947 and 1956. He was a member of the Edrich cricketing family from Norfolk. His three brothers, Eric, Geoff and Bill, and his cousin, John, all played first-class cricket.

== Early life ==
Edrich was born in Cantley, Norfolk in 1922. He grew up on the family farm near Lingwood and in East Yorkshire when the family moved north in 1932, returning to live near Heacham. He played cricket for Heacham, playing for the First XI by 1938, aged 16. He was playing for an Edrich family team in 1938 when he was recommended as a promising youngster to Kent County Cricket Club who offered him a contract for the 1939 season without seeing him play.

== Cricket career ==
Edrich signed for Kent in 1939 and played for the Second XI during his first season. The Second World War intervened and Edrich was not able to make his first-class cricket debut until the 1947 season. During the war he served in the Royal Air Force in Canada, India and Ceylon.

After making his debut against Lancashire in May 1947, he went on to play 181 first-class matches for Kent and Glamorgan between 1947 and 1956, scoring 5,529 runs. He broke into the Kent First XI as a regular in 1949, scoring 893 runs and taking 37 wickets, including both his career high score (193 scored against Sussex) and best bowling figures (7/41 taken against Hampshire). His innings against Sussex set a new Kent record partnership of 161 for the ninth wicket, made with Fred Ridgway at Tunbridge Wells.

He was awarded his county cap by Kent in 1949 and his most prolific season was 1951 in which he passed 1,000 runs for the only time in his career, finishing with 1,267, including two centuries, and took 49 wickets. After this season he bowled rarely and his form became "patchy" and he was released by Kent after making 128 appearances at the end of the 1953 season. He joined Glamorgan for three seasons as a player, becoming an assistant coach in 1956 and playing in the Second XI to help develop young players. Financial cutbacks led to his coaching role being lost in the early 1960s and he moved to coach cricket at St Edward's School, Oxford in 1964.

Whilst working in Oxford he played for Oxfordshire between 1966 and 1971, making 28 appearances in the Minor Counties Championship and playing twice in the Gillette Cup. He made one appearance for the Minor Counties representative team against the touring Pakistanis in 1967, his final first-class match.

== Later life ==
Edrich died at Padstow in Cornwall in 2009 aged 86.
