= Norfolk County Cricket Club =

English cricket club

Personnel
- Captain: Sam Arthurton

Team information
- Founded: 1876
- Home ground: Barker's Lane, Sprowston

History
- Minor Counties wins: 5 (including 2 shared)
- MCCA Trophy wins: 6
- NC Twenty20 wins: 1
- Official website: Norfolk CCC

Norfolk County Cricket Club is one of twenty National County Cricket Clubs within the domestic cricket structure of England and Wales. It represents the historic county of Norfolk.

The club is a member of the National Counties Championship Eastern Division and plays in the NCCA Championship, the NCCA Knockout Trophy and, since 2018, in the NCCA Twenty20 competition. Norfolk took part in limited overs competitions which included first-class counties between 1965 and 2004. The club's main home venue is Barker's Lane in Sprowston, on the northern edge of Norwich, although it has used other locations throughout the county.

== History ==
The earliest reference to cricket in Norfolk is from 1745, although the game was known in the county before that date. FS Ashley-Cooper, writing in 1910 recounted a "tradition" of a club playing at Swaffham as early as 1700, and games played in London and South-East England featured in press reports in the Norwich press during the 1720s and 30s.

=== Early county teams ===
The first matches played by Norfolk were against Suffolk at Bury St Edmunds, Diss and Scole in 1764. An 1820 match at Lord's against MCC is considered to have first-class status, although the Norfolk team was weak and made up primarily of players from Holt Cricket Club.

The first Norfolk County Club was organised in 1827 by Lord Suffield and by 1831 the Norfolk County Club was considered one of the strongest clubs in the country by The Sporting Magazine. Five matches played between 1833 and 1836 against Yorkshire teams have been given first-class status, although the matches were played by professional cricketers rather than the amateurs who made up Suffield's County Club.

The County Club had largely ceased to operate by 1848, although it was "revived" in 1862 for a time, and matches continued to be played by teams using the name Norfolk.

=== Formation of the club ===
The current county club was founded in October 1876, with the fifth Lord Suffield as president, and played its first matches in 1877. The county joined the Minor Counties Championship when it was formed in 1895. It did not play enough matches to qualify for the tournament in 1896, (Note: At the time, teams needed to play at least eight matches against other members the Minor Counties Association to qualify for the final table. Norfolk played only six fixtures against MCCA teams during the 1896 season.) and, after failing to win a Championship match in either 1900 and 1901, withdrew from the Championship in 1902 and 1903, before returning the in 1904. It has continued to compete in the Minor Counties Championship in every season since.

== Grounds ==
From the 2025 season, Norfolk's main ground will be Barker's Lane in Sprowston on the northern edge of Norwich. The club moved to the ground having used Manor Park in Horsford between 2001 and 2024. Prior to this, the County Ground in Lakenham, close to the centre of the city, had been used. The ground had been used for cricket since 1827 and was redeveloped for housing in the early 21st century. The cricket pitch and historic pavilion were destroyed during the redevelopment. The club has played home matches on ten other grounds within the county.

== Notable players ==
Players who represented Norfolk and who have subsequently gone on to play over 100 first-class matches or Test cricket include:

- Bill Edrich – 39 Test matches for England between 1938 and 1954–55
- John Edrich – 77 Test matches and seven One Day Internationals (ODIs) for England between 1963 and 1976
- Geoff Edrich – 339 first-class appearances for Lancashire between 1946 and 1958
- Michael Barton – Surrey captain from 1949 to 1951. 147 first-class matches played
- Peter Parfitt – 37 Test matches for England between 1961 and 1972
- Clive Radley – eight Test matches and four ODIs for England in 1978. 559 first-class matches played
- Martin Saggers – three Test matches for England in 2003–04. 119 first-class matches played
- Olly Stone – five Test matches and 10 ODIs for England between 2018 and 2024

Former Test Match Special commentator Henry Blofeld played one List A match and 44 times in minor counties competitions for Norfolk between 1956 and 1965.

== Honours ==
Norfolk has won the Minor Counties Championship five times, two of them shared. It won the first Championship in 1895, sharing with Durham and Worcestershire. It won outright in 1905, 1910 and 1913. Its most recent success was a shared title with Herefordshire in 2002. Norfolk has won the MCCA Knockout Trophy six times since its inception in 1983, winning in 1986, 1997, 2001, 2005, 2009 and 2024, and the Twenty20 trophy once, in 2025.

- Minor Counties Championship (3) – 1905, 1910, 1913; shared (2) – 1895, 2002
- MCCA Knockout Trophy (6) – 1986, 1997, 2001, 2005, 2009, 2024
- MCCA Twenty20 (1) – 2025

== See also ==
- Norfolk Women cricket team

== Bibliography ==
- Hounsome, Keir (2015). A Game Well Played: a history of cricket in Norfolk. Norwich: Hounsome. ISBN 978-0-9932296-0-2
