= Geoff Edrich =

English cricketer (1918–2004)

Personal information
- Full name: Geoffrey Arthur Edrich
- Born: 13 July 1918; Lingwood, Norfolk
- Died: 2 January 2004 (aged 85); Cheltenham, Gloucestershire
- Batting: Right-handed
- Bowling: Right-arm medium

Domestic team information
- Years: Team
- 1937–1939: Norfolk
- 1946–1958: Lancashire
- 1960–1962: Cumberland

Career statistics
Competition	First-class
Matches	339
Runs scored	15,600
Batting average	34.82
100s/50s	26/80
Top score	167*
Balls bowled	786
Wickets	5
Bowling average	79.80
5 wickets in innings	0
10 wickets in match	0
Best bowling	1/8
Catches/stumpings	332/–
- Source: Cricinfo, 19 January 2014

Geoffrey Arthur Edrich (13 July 1918 – 2 January 2004) was an English first-class cricketer born in Lingwood, Norfolk, who played in 339 matches for Lancashire between 1946 and 1958 as a right-handed batsman. Before his first-class career, he had played Minor Counties cricket for Norfolk (1937–1939), and after his first-class retirement he returned to the Minor Counties, this time playing for Cumberland (1960–1962). Whilst at Cumberland, he was also professional for Workington Cricket Club.

He captained Lancashire to a win over Leicestershire at Old Trafford in 1956 in a match in which his team did not lose a single wicket, the first time this had happened in a first-class match. Leicestershire were bowled out for 108 and 122, and Lancashire (166 for 0 declared and 66 for 0) won by ten wickets. His highest score was 167 not out (followed by 84 in the second innings) for Lancashire against Nottinghamshire in 1954.

Edrich's three brothers, Brian, Eric and Bill and also his cousin, John Edrich, all played first-class cricket. Though, unlike his brother Bill and cousin John, Geoff Edrich never played for England, he toured India in 1953/54 with a Commonwealth XI, scoring 641 runs at an average of 40.06 and playing in three of the "Unofficial Tests".

Edrich joined the Royal Norfolk Regiment and was taken prisoner at the Battle of Singapore. He survived three years' captivity in a Japanese prisoner of war camp, during the Second World War, including a stint on the infamous Burma Railway. After his playing career he became the groundsman and coach at Cheltenham College.

He died on 2 January 2004, aged 85.
