= Angelou (band) =

English folk rock band

Angelou was an English folk rock band formed in 1996 by singer-songwriter Holly Lerski with guitarist Jo Baker, the duo taking the band's name from the author Maya Angelou or also known as Marguerite Annie Johnson .

Angelou debuted on Boo Hewerdine's independent record label Haven Records in 1997 with the "Hallelujah" EP. Joined by Phil Di Palma and Chris Evans, they followed this up with two critically acclaimed albums, Automiracles (1998) and While You Were Sleeping (2000).

Angelou toured Spain extensively in 2001, promoting their Spanish 'best of' release, Midnight Witcheries, with new members Cath Evans and Ann Richardson. The band returned a second time for the Benicàssim festival 2001 tour, promoting their "Summertime" EP.

After their return to England they signed to Sanctuary Records and recorded their third album, Life Is Beautiful, releasing it under Holly Lerski's name. The album finally broke Lerski and her band into the mainstream through heavy radio support for their two singles. Lerski left Sanctuary Records in 2005 through lack of support for the record. The company dissolved soon after, to eventually be bought out by the Universal Music Group.

== Discography ==
Hallelujah EP (1997)

Automiracles (1998)

1. She Stays
2. Flesh and Blood
3. Honeysuckle Again
4. Automatic Miracles
5. Humble
6. Thank You
7. Let's Go Home
8. The Mermaid Girl
9. Elysian Fields
10. Lullaby

While You Were Sleeping (2000)

1. Sainte Genevieve
2. The Shipping News
3. Rise Up
4. Glittering Creatures
5. Fall
6. Bitter Honey
7. While You Were Sleeping
8. Coat
9. Summer Homecoming
10. This is Not a Lovesong
11. Little Sister
