= History of cricket in South Africa from 1918–19 to 1945 =

This article describes the history of South African cricket from the aftermath of the First World War in 1919 to the end of the Second World War in 1945.

== Domestic cricket from 1919 to 1945 ==
Domestic first-class matches focused on the Currie Cup competition which, although it was the national championship, was not always contested because of travel constraints and other reasons. The Currie Cup was not held in seasons when there was a Test tour of South Africa, though it was held in 1931–32 when the South African Test side traveled to Australia and New Zealand.

Until 1926 all cricket in South Africa was played on matting pitches. The first Currie Cup match to be played on a turf pitch was held at the Kingsmead ground in Durban in December 1926, between Natal and Border. The first Test matches on turf pitches were held during the English tour of 1930–31. By the end of the 1930s, all first-class matches in South Africa were played on turf pitches.

=== Currie Cup winners from 1919–20 to 1944–45 ===
1. Not contested: 1919–20, 1922–23, 1924–25, 1927–28, 1928–29, 1930–31, 1932–33, 1935–36, 1938–39, 1939–40, 1940–41, 1941–42, 1942–43, 1943–44, 1944–45.
2. 1920–21: Western Province
3. 1921–22: undecided
4. 1923–24: Transvaal
5. 1925–26: Transvaal
6. 1926–27: Transvaal
7. 1929–30: Transvaal
8. 1931–32: Western Province
9. 1933–34: Natal
10. 1934–35: Transvaal
11. 1936–37: Natal
12. 1937–38: Natal and Transvaal (shared)

=== Second World War ===
From the outset of the war, South Africa was actively involved as a member of the Allies. The war brought austerity and cricket was considered by many to be frivolous in such circumstances. Only one first-class game was played in South Africa during the wartime seasons.

This match took place during the 1942 New Year period at Newlands in Cape Town between Western Province and Transvaal. It ended in a draw. Western Province batted first and scored 237 in 79.1 overs. In reply, James Pickerill's 71 was the top score, and Reginald Lofthouse's 4–63 was the best return as Transvaal made 251 for 8 declared. Sidney Kiel top-scored in the match with 128 not out as Western Province declared on 236 for 8. This didn't quite leave enough time for a result and Transvaal had made 166–6 when stumps were drawn.

== International tours of South Africa from 1919–20 to 1944–45 ==
=== Australian Imperial Forces (AIF) 1919–20 ===
- Western Province v AIF – AIF won by 2 wickets
- Transvaal v AIF – match drawn
- Natal v AIF – AIF won by 310 runs
- Natal v AIF – AIF won by an innings and 42 runs
- Transvaal v AIF – AIF won by an innings and 14 runs
- South Africa v AIF – AIF won by 8 wickets
- South Africa v AIF – AIF won by an innings and 129 runs
- Western Province v AIF – match drawn

The AIF team had players of the caliber of Jack Gregory, Herbie Collins, Bert Oldfield, and Nip Pellew.

=== Australia 1921–22 ===
- 1st Test at Lord's, Durban – match drawn
- 2nd Test at Old Wanderers, Johannesburg – match drawn
- 3rd Test at Newlands Cricket Ground, Cape Town – Australia won by 10 wickets

=== England 1922–23 ===
- 1st Test at Old Wanderers, Johannesburg – South Africa won by 168 runs
- 2nd Test at Newlands Cricket Ground, Cape Town – England won by 1 wicket
- 3rd Test at Kingsmead, Durban – match drawn
- 4th Test at Old Wanderers, Johannesburg – match drawn
- 5th Test at Kingsmead, Durban – England won by 109 runs

=== England 1924–25 ===
A team captained by Lionel Tennyson and including 12 past or future England Test players toured South Africa between November 1924 and February 1925.

=== England 1927–28 ===
- 1st Test at Old Wanderers, Johannesburg – England won by 10 wickets
- 2nd Test at Newlands Cricket Ground, Cape Town – England won by 87 runs
- 3rd Test at Kingsmead, Durban – match drawn
- 4th Test at Old Wanderers, Johannesburg – South Africa won by 4 wickets
- 5th Test at Kingsmead, Durban – South Africa won by 8 wickets

=== England 1930–31 ===
- 1st Test at Old Wanderers, Johannesburg – South Africa won by 28 runs
- 2nd Test at Newlands Cricket Ground, Cape Town – match drawn
- 3rd Test at Kingsmead, Durban – match drawn
- 4th Test at Old Wanderers, Johannesburg – match drawn
- 5th Test at Kingsmead, Durban – match drawn

=== Australia 1935–36 ===
- 1st Test at Kingsmead, Durban – Australia won by 9 wickets
- 2nd Test at Old Wanderers, Johannesburg – match drawn
- 3rd Test at Newlands Cricket Ground, Cape Town – Australia won by an innings and 78 runs
- 4th Test at Old Wanderers, Johannesburg – Australia won by an innings and 184 runs
- 5th Test at Kingsmead, Durban – Australia won by an innings and 6 runs

=== England 1938–39 ===
- 1st Test at Old Wanderers, Johannesburg – match drawn
- 2nd Test at Newlands Cricket Ground, Cape Town – match drawn
- 3rd Test at Kingsmead, Durban – England won by an innings and 13 runs
- 4th Test at Old Wanderers, Johannesburg – match drawn
- 5th Test at Kingsmead, Durban – match drawn
