= Eric Edrich =

English cricketer

Eric Harry Edrich (27 March 1914 – 9 July 1993) was an English first-class cricketer. Born in Lingwood, Norfolk, Edrich played in 36 first-class matches for Lancashire as a wicketkeeper between 1946 and 1948, before becoming a farmer. His three brothers, Brian, Geoff and Bill, and also his cousin, John Edrich, all played first-class cricket.

He died in Wistow, Cambridgeshire aged 79.
