= John Edrich =

English cricketer (1937–2020)

John Edrich MBE
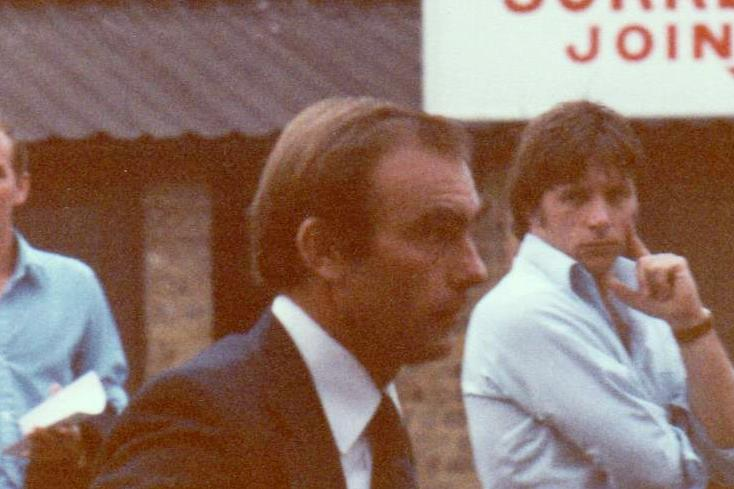
- Edrich at an England vs Australia veterans match at The Oval in 1980

Personal information
- Full name: John Hugh Edrich
- Born: 21 June 1937; Blofield, Norfolk, England
- Died: 23 December 2020 (aged 83); Scotland
- Batting: Left-handed
- Bowling: Right-arm medium

International information
- National side: England
- Test debut (cap 415): 6 June 1963 v West Indies
- Last Test: 8 July 1976 v West Indies
- ODI debut (cap 4): 5 January 1971 v Australia
- Last ODI: 9 March 1975 v New Zealand

Domestic team information
- Years: Team
- 1954: Norfolk
- 1958–1978: Surrey
- 1979: Norfolk

Career statistics
Competition	Test	ODI	FC	LA
Matches	77	7	564	160
Runs scored	5,138	223	39,790	4,792
Batting average	43.54	37.16	45.47	35.23
100s/50s	12/24	0/2	103/188	1/39
Top score	310*	90	310*	108*
Balls bowled	30	–	91	–
Wickets	0	–	0	–
Bowling average	–	–	–	–
5 wickets in innings	–	–	–	–
10 wickets in match	–	–	–	–
Best bowling	–	–	–	–
Catches/stumpings	43/–	0/–	310/–	44/–
- Source: CricInfo, 10 December 2013

John Hugh Edrich, MBE (21 June 1937 – 23 December 2020) was an English first-class cricketer who, during a career that ran from 1956 to 1978, was considered one of the best batsmen of his generation. Born in Blofield, Norfolk, Edrich came from a cricketing family, his four cousins, Eric Edrich, Bill Edrich, Geoff Edrich and Brian Edrich, all having played first-class cricket. He was educated at the private Bracondale School between the ages of eight and seventeen, during which time he played cricket at weekends and was coached by former cricketer C. S. R. Boswell.

Edrich played for Surrey and England. He was renowned for playing the cut, the cover drive and scoring off his legs, earning over the years a reputation for dogged fearlessness. His statistical achievements show that he was amongst the best players of his generation, playing a total of seventy-seven Test matches for England between 1963 and 1976, and scoring a triple-century in 1965 that is the sixth highest Test score for England. It contained 57 boundaries, which is still a record for any Test innings.

A player during the time when One Day International cricket was in its infancy, he played, and top scored, in the first ever ODI match. The cricket writer Colin Bateman described him as "unflinching, unselfish, and often unsmiling while going about his business in the middle, he was a fiercely formidable opener who knew his limitations and worked wonderfully within them".

== Life and career ==
Having played four first-class matches for Combined Services in 1956 and 1957, whilst doing his national service in the British Army, Edrich made his first-class debut for Surrey in their final fixture of the 1958 season. The following year, he came to the fore, scoring 1,799 runs at an average of 52.91. Over the next four years he and Micky Stewart became an effective opening partnership for the county, to the extent that both were called up for England for the Test series against the West Indies, who were dominating the sport at this time. Despite Edrich's strong performances for his county, he managed a total of only 108 Test runs in six innings facing bowlers including Hall, Sobers and Griffith.

However, an opportunity to break back into the international side arose when Geoffrey Boycott was injured during Australia's tour of England in 1964. Edrich was called up to the side for the Second Test, at Lord's, and did not disappoint, scoring 120. The match ended in a draw due to rain. However, he was not selected for the 1964–65 tour of South Africa.

Injuries to other players resulted in another recall to the England side for the Third Test against New Zealand at Headingley in July 1965, where he scored 310 not out. This innings spanned over eight hours, and included 52 fours and five sixes – 238 runs or 77% of his innings. Commentators at the time said that he might have broken the existing Test record of 365 within another 90 minutes or so if his captain, Mike Smith, had not felt it necessary to declare the innings closed. However, a week later during the First Test against South Africa, he suffered a blow to the head from a short-pitched delivery by Peter Pollock. This was before helmets came into use, and he was forced to retire hurt on 7 not out. Wisden named Edrich as Cricketer of the Year in 1966 for his achievements in 1965, alongside Colin Bland, Dick Motz, Graeme Pollock and brother Peter Pollock. As well as his Test triple century, he had scored a total of 2,319 runs at an average of 62.67 during the season, including eight hundreds. At one stage, in nine successive innings he scored 139, 121*, 205*, 55, 96, 188, 92, 105 and 310*. Not previously known as a big hitter, he struck forty-nine sixes during the course of the season.

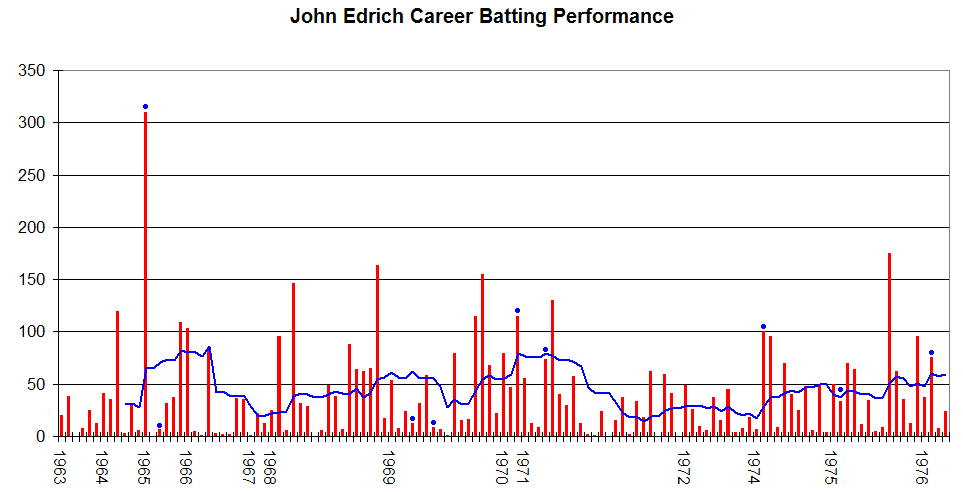
John Edrich's Test career performance graph

He had by now become an established member of the England batting line-up, rarely omitted unless injured. Beginning with the 1965–66 Ashes series, he sometimes batted at number three rather than, as hitherto, opening the innings. In the 1970–71 Ashes series his 687 runs (52.85) kept him at the crease for 33 hours and 26 minutes, a record for a Test series until broken by Glenn Turner against West Indies the next season. His form at this time helped England play 27 consecutive Tests without defeat in 1968–71, and lose only one Test out of 40 in 1966–71.

Edrich played in the first-ever One Day International (ODI), on 5 January 1971 against Australia. After the Third Test had been called off due to rain, the umpires called for an unscheduled match, consisting of 40 eight-ball overs per side. Edrich top-scored with 82 runs, thus scoring the first half-century in an ODI, and won the first Man of the Match award in ODI history.

The following summer, Surrey won the County Championship for the first time since 1958, with Edrich's batting being an important factor in the county's success. By now, Stewart had dropped down the order to number three, and Edrich had formed another successful opening partnership with Mike Edwards. Stewart retired after the 1972 season, and from 1973 to 1977 Edrich succeeded him as Surrey's captain.

On the tour of Australia in 1974–75, his fortune regarding injuries did not improve. In the first Test a ball from aggressive pace bowler Dennis Lillee struck his hand and broke it, although he was able to continue batting. In the Fourth Test, the then captain Mike Denness dropped himself and Edrich was subsequently named as captain. He had little luck in that game when Lillee broke his ribs with the first ball of his second innings, although he did recover to bat later on, scoring 33 runs. England lost the test, and it was to be his only appearance as captain.

During the 1977 county cricket season, Edrich scored his 100th first-class century, playing for Surrey against Derbyshire. In the same year he was appointed an MBE for services to cricket. Edrich finished his first-class career in 1978, having scored 39,790 runs. He became a Test selector in 1981.

In 1995 he was named as England's batting coach. In the summer of 2000, it was announced that he had been diagnosed with a rare form of incurable leukaemia known as Waldenstrom's, and he was told that he had seven years to live. In an interview with The Independent, following his diagnosis, Edrich said:

I hadn't seen a doctor for about 10 years, but I'd been feeling tired for a while. Having taken blood tests they discovered leukaemia. It was quite a shock. You can't fight it. You have to have faith in your consultant and the treatment. I asked how it was going to affect my lifestyle. They said I would feel tired from time to time and would have to live with it. I think we've got to be grateful for what we've had. I did something which I loved and had the ability to play cricket at the highest level.

In 2006–07 he served as President of Surrey County Cricket Club. In 2012 he said he had been cured of cancer by a course of injections of mistletoe extract, and was fit and active again. He lived in Aberdeenshire.

Edrich died on 23 December 2020 at his home in north Scotland, aged 83.

Preceded by Mike Denness	England ODI Captain; 1974–75	Succeeded by Alan Knott
