= Norfolk =

County of England

- Non-metropolitan and ceremonial county
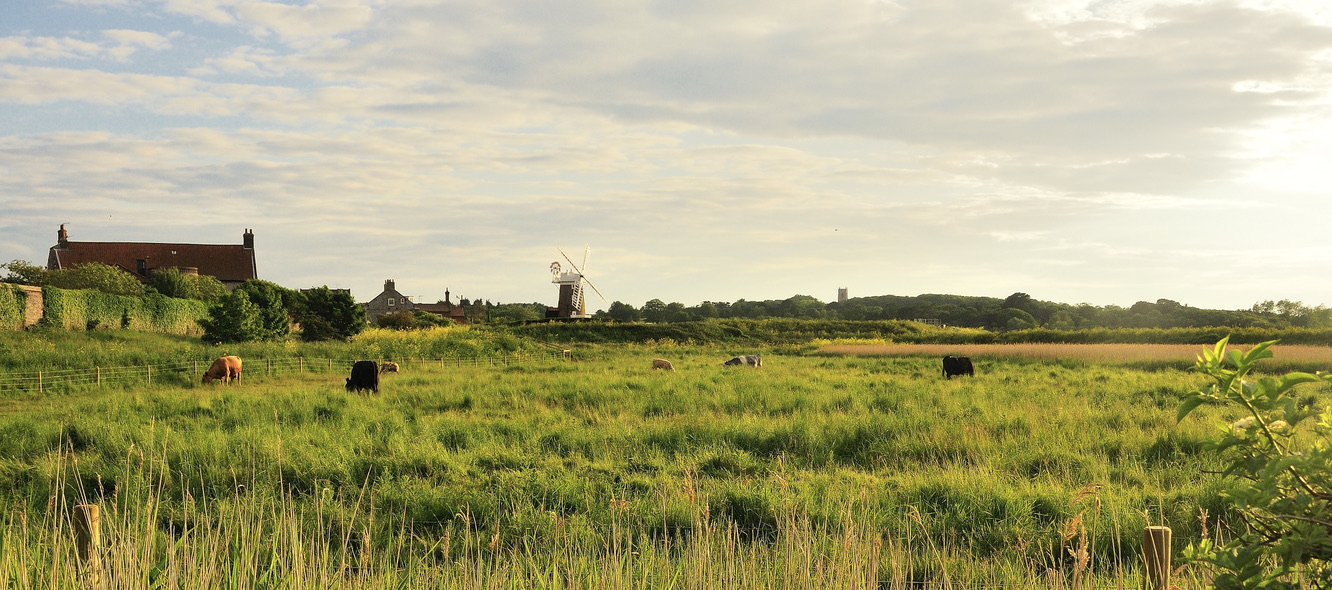
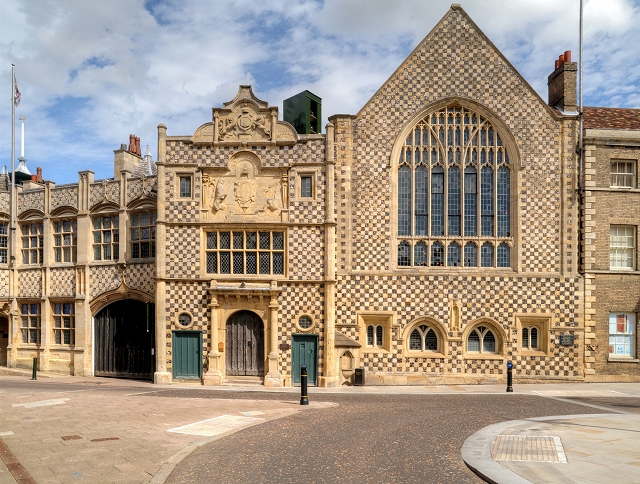
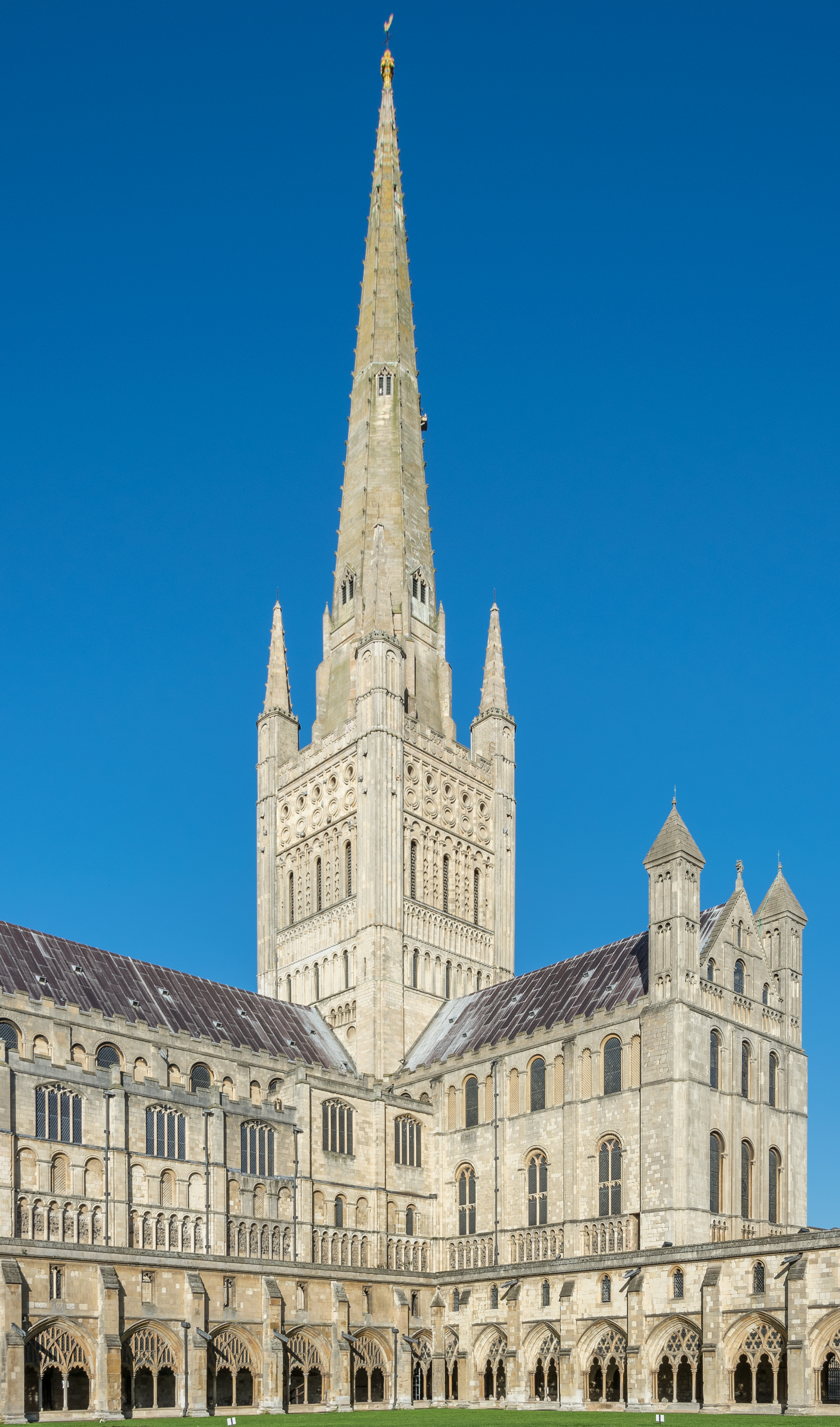
- Clockwise from top: Cley next the Sea and its windmill; Norwich Cathedral; and King's Lynn Guildhall, showing Norfolk flint flushwork

- Coordinates: 52°40′21″N 00°57′00″E
- Sovereign state: United Kingdom
- Constituent country: England
- Region: East of England
- Established: Anglo-Saxon period
- Time zone: UTC+0 (GMT)
  - Summer (DST): UTC+1 (BST)
- UK Parliament: 10 MPs
- Police: Norfolk Constabulary
- Ceremonial county
- Lord Lieutenant: The Lady Dannatt
- High Sheriff: Jonathan Charles Pearson
- Area: 5,384 km^{2} (2,079 sq mi)
  - Rank: 5th of 48
- Population (2024): 940,359
  - Rank: 25th of 48
  - Density: 175/km^{2} (450/sq mi)
- Non-metropolitan county
- County council: Norfolk County Council
- Control: No overall control
- Admin HQ: Norwich
- Area: 5,384 km^{2} (2,079 sq mi)
  - Rank: 3rd of 21
- Population (2025): 945,427
  - Rank: 7th of 21
  - Density: 176/km^{2} (460/sq mi)
- ISO 3166-2: GB-NFK
- GSS code: E10000020
- ITL: TLH13
- Website: norfolk.gov.uk
- Districts
- Districts of Norfolk
- Districts: List: Norwich; South Norfolk; Great Yarmouth; Broadland; North Norfolk; King's Lynn and West Norfolk; Breckland

Norfolk (/ˈnɔːrfək, -fʊk/ NOR-fək, -fuuk) is a ceremonial county in England, located in the East of England and East Anglia. It borders Lincolnshire and The Wash to the north-west, the North Sea to the north and east, Cambridgeshire to the west, and Suffolk to the south. The largest settlement is the city of Norwich.

The county has an area of 2,074 mi^{2} (5,370 km^{2}) and had an estimated population of 940,359 in 2024. It is predominantly rural. Norwich is in the centre-east of the county, and its other principal settlements include Great Yarmouth on the east coast, Thetford in the south, and King's Lynn in the north-west. For local government purposes Norfolk is a non-metropolitan county with seven districts.

The centre of Norfolk is gently undulating lowland. To the east are the northern half of the Broads, a network of rivers and lakes which extend into Suffolk and have a similar status to a national park. The west of the county contains part of the Fens, and to the south is part of Thetford Forest. The geology of the county includes clay and chalk deposits, which make its coast susceptible to erosion; the northern coast has been designated a national landscape.

There is evidence of Prehistoric settlement in Norfolk. In the Roman era the region was home to the Iceni, whose leader Boudica led a major revolt in AD60. The Angles settled the area in the 5th century, after which it became part of the Kingdom of East Anglia. During the later Middle Ages the county was prosperous and heavily involved in the wool trade; this allowed the construction of many large churches. In 1549 Norfolk was the scene of Kett's Rebellion, which unsuccessfully protested the enclosure of land. The county was not heavily industrialised during the Industrial Revolution, and Norwich lost its status as one of England's largest cities. The contemporary economy is largely based on agriculture and tourism.

== History ==
The area that was to become Norfolk was settled in pre-Roman times (there were Palaeolithic settlers as early as 950,000 years ago), with camps along the higher land in the west, where flints could be quarried. A Brittonic tribe, the Iceni, emerged in the 1st century BC. The Iceni revolted against the Roman invasion in AD 47, and again in 60 led by Boudica. The crushing of the second rebellion opened the area to the Romans. During the Roman era roads and ports were constructed throughout the area and farming was widespread.

Situated on the east coast, the homelands of the Iceni were vulnerable to attacks from continental Europe and other parts of Britain, and forts were built to defend against raids by the Saxons and the Picts. A period of depopulation, which may have been due to these threats, seems to have followed the departure of the Romans. Soon afterward, Germanic peoples from the North Sea area settled in the region. Though they became known as Angles, they were likely not affiliated to any tribe in particular at the time of their migration. It is thought that the settlement here was early (possibly beginning at the start of the fifth century, thereby preceding the alleged date of Hengist and Horsa's arrival in Kent) and that it occurred on a large scale.

By the 5th century, the Angles had established control over the region. They later became known as the "north folk" and the "south folk," giving rise to the names "Norfolk" and "Suffolk." Norfolk, Suffolk, and nearby territories formed the Kingdom of East Anglia, one of the Anglo-Saxon heptarchy, which was later incorporated into Mercia and subsequently into Wessex. The influence of the early English settlers is evident in numerous place names ending in "-ham," "-ingham," and "-ton." Place-name endings such as "-by" and "-thorpe" are also common and indicate Danish origins; during the 9th century, the region was subject to Danish attacks, during which King Edmund the Martyr was killed. Additionally, several place names in the Fenland area contain Celtic elements, which some scholars interpret as evidence of a significant Brittonic population in the region.

In the centuries before the Norman Conquest the wetlands of the east of the county began to be converted to farmland, and settlements grew in these areas. Migration into East Anglia must have been high: by the time of the Domesday Book survey it was one of the most densely populated parts of the British Isles. During the high and late Middle Ages the county developed arable agriculture and woollen industries. Norfolk's prosperity at that time is evident from the county's large number of medieval churches: out of an original total of over one thousand some 659 have survived, more than in any other county in Britain and the greatest concentration in the world. The economy was in decline by the time of the Black Death, which dramatically reduced the population in 1349.

Kett's Rebellion occurred in Norfolk during the reign of Edward VI, largely in response to the enclosure of land by landlords, leaving peasants with nowhere to graze their animals, and to the general abuses of power by the nobility. It was led by Robert Kett, a yeoman farmer, who was joined by recruits from Norwich and the surrounding countryside. His group numbered some 16,000 by the time the rebels stormed Norwich on 29 July 1549 and took the city. Kett's rebellion ended on 27 August when the rebels were defeated by an army under the leadership of John Dudley, 1st Duke of Northumberland at the Battle of Dussindale. Some 3,000 rebels were killed. Kett was captured, held in the Tower of London, tried for treason, and hanged from the walls of Norwich Castle.

By the late 16th century Norwich had grown to become the second-largest city in England, but over one-third of its population died in the plague epidemic of 1579, and in 1665 the Great Plague again killed around one-third of the population. During the English Civil War Norfolk was largely Parliamentarian. The economy and agriculture of the region declined somewhat. During the Industrial Revolution Norfolk developed little industry, except in Norwich, which was a late addition to the railway network.

Early military units included the Norfolk Militia. The local British Army regiments included the Royal Norfolk Regiment (now the Royal Anglian Regiment) and the Norfolk Yeomanry. In the 20th century the county developed a role in aviation. The first development in airfields came with the First World War; there was then a massive expansion during the Second World War with the growth of the Royal Air Force and the influx of the American USAAF 8th Air Force which operated from many Norfolk airfields.

During the Second World War agriculture rapidly intensified, and it has remained very intensive since, with the establishment of large fields for growing cereals and oilseed rape.

== Economy and industry ==
As of 1998 Norfolk had a gross domestic product (GDP) of £9,319 million, which represents 1.5% of England's economy and 1.25% of the United Kingdom's economy. The GDP per head was £11,825, compared to £13,635 for East Anglia, £12,845 for England and £12,438 for the United Kingdom. In 1999–2000 the county had an unemployment rate of 5.6%, compared to 5.8% for England and 6.0% for the UK.

Data from 2017 gave the median hourly gross pay as £12.17 and the median weekly pay as £496.80; on a per year basis, the median gross income was £25,458. The employment rate among persons aged 16 to 64 was 74.2% while the unemployment rate was 4.6%. The Norfolk economy was "treading water with manufacturing sales and recruitment remaining static in the first quarter of the year" according to research published in April 2018. A spokesperson for the Norfolk Chamber of Commerce commented: "At a time when Norfolk firms face steep up-front costs, the apprenticeship system is in crisis, roads are being allowed to crumble, mobile phone and broadband 'not-spots' are multiplying, it's obvious that the key to improved productivity and competitiveness lies in getting the basics right". The solution was seen as a need for the UK government to provide "a far stronger domestic economic agenda ... to fix the fundamentals needed for business to thrive here..."

As of 2017, tourism was adding £3.25 billion to the economy per year and supported some 65,000 jobs, being the fifth most important employment in Norfolk. The visitor economy had increased in value by more than £500 million since 2012.

Important business sectors also include energy (oil, gas and renewables), advanced engineering and manufacturing, and food and farming.

Much of Norfolk's fairly flat and fertile land has been drained for use as arable land. The principal arable crops are sugar beet, wheat, barley (for brewing) and oil seed rape. The county also boasts a saffron grower. As of 2006, over 20% of employment in the county was in the agricultural and food industries.

Well-known companies in Norfolk are Aviva (formerly Norwich Union), Colman's (part of Unilever), Lotus Cars and Bernard Matthews Farms. The Construction Industry Training Board is based on the former airfield of RAF Bircham Newton. Brewer Greene King, food producer Cranswick and feed supplier ForFarmers were seeing growth in 2016–2017.

A local enterprise partnership was being established by business leaders to help grow jobs across Norfolk and Suffolk. They secured an enterprise zone to help grow businesses in the energy sector, and established the two counties as a centre for growing services and products for the green economy.

To help local industry in Norwich, the local council offered a wireless internet service, but this was subsequently withdrawn as funding had ceased.

The fishery business still continued in 2018, with individuals such as John Lee, a fifth generation crabman, who sells Cromer Crabs to eateries such as M Restaurants and the Blueprint Café. The problem that he has found is attracting young people to this small industry which calls for working many hours per week during the season. Lobster trapping also continued in North Norfolk, around Sheringham and Cromer, for example.

=== Management of the shoreline ===
Norfolk's low-lying land and easily eroded cliffs, many of which are composed of chalk and clay, make it vulnerable to weathering by the sea. The most recent major erosion event occurred during the North Sea flood of 1953.

The low-lying section of coast between Kelling and Lowestoft Ness in Suffolk is currently managed by the Environment Agency to protect the Broads from sea flooding. Management policy for the North Norfolk coastline is described in the "North Norfolk Shoreline Management Plan" published in 2006, but has yet to be accepted by local authorities. The Shoreline Management Plan states that the stretch of coast will be protected for at least another 50 years, but that in the event of sea level rise and post-glacial lowering of land levels in the South East, there may a need for further research to inform future management decisions, including the possibility that the sea defences may have to be realigned to a more sustainable position. Natural England have contributed some research into the impacts on the environment of various realignment options. The draft report of their research was leaked to the press, who created great anxiety by reporting that Natural England plan to abandon a large section of the Norfolk Broads, villages and farmland to the sea to save the rest of the Norfolk coastline from the impact of any adverse climate change.

== Media ==
=== Television ===
Most of the county is covered by BBC East and ITV Anglia, which both broadcast from Norwich. Television signals for the majority of this area are received from the Tacolneston transmitting station. The far western parts of the county, including Downham Market is covered by the Sandy Heath transmitting station. Some of the northern parts of Norfolk including Hunstanton and Blakeney are covered by BBC Yorkshire and Lincolnshire transmissions from the Belmont transmitting station, broadcasting from Hull, and ITV Yorkshire, which broadcast from Leeds.

=== Radio ===
BBC Local Radio for the county is served by BBC Radio Norfolk. County-wide commercial radio stations are Heart East, Greatest Hits Radio East and Amber Radio. Community based stations are Future Radio (serving Norwich), Harbour Radio (for Great Yarmouth), KL1 Radio (covering North West Norfolk), Park Radio (covering Diss) and Poppyland Community Radio (serving North Norfolk).

=== Newspapers ===
Norfolk is served by these local newspapers:

- Eastern Daily Press (county-wide)
- Norwich Evening News (Norwich)
- Great Yarmouth Mercury (Great Yarmouth)
- Lynn News (King's Lynn and Hunstanton)
- Diss Express (Diss)
- North Norfolk News (North Norfolk)

== Education ==
=== Primary and secondary education ===
Before 2011, Norfolk had a completely comprehensive state education or "maintained" system managed by Norfolk County Council, with secondary school age from 11 to 16 or in some schools with sixth forms, 18 years old. Since then, a number of schools formerly in the maintained system have left it to become academies, or members of academy groups. Others have become free schools. Both academies and free schools are still publicly funded by the Department of Education but are not with county council management.

In many of the rural areas, there is no nearby sixth form, and so sixth form colleges are found in larger towns. There are twelve private schools, including Gresham's School in Holt in the north of the county, Thetford Grammar School in Thetford, which is Britain's fifth oldest extant school, Langley School in Loddon, and several in the city of Norwich, including Norwich School and Norwich High School for Girls. The King's Lynn district has the largest school population. Norfolk is also home to Wymondham College, the UK's largest remaining state boarding school.

=== Tertiary education ===
The University of East Anglia is located on the outskirts of Norwich, and Norwich University of the Arts is based in seven buildings in and around St George's Street in the city centre, next to the River Wensum.

The City College Norwich and the College of West Anglia are colleges covering Norwich and King's Lynn as well as Norfolk as a whole. Easton & Otley College, 7 mi (11 km) west of Norwich, provides agriculture-based courses for the county, parts of Suffolk, and nationally.

The University of Suffolk also runs higher education courses in Norfolk, from multiple locations including Great Yarmouth College.

== Politics ==
=== Local ===
The coat of arms of Norfolk County Council

Norfolk County Council provides county-level local government functions across Norfolk. District-level functions are performed by the councils of Norfolk's seven districts: Breckland, Broadland, Great Yarmouth, King's Lynn and West Norfolk, North Norfolk, Norwich and South Norfolk.

Below the district councils, the majority of the county is divided into parish and town councils, the lowest tier of local government (the only exceptions being parts of Norwich and King's Lynn urban areas).

=== National ===
The county is divided into ten parliamentary constituencies, with Waveney Valley straddling the border with Suffolk:

Constituency	Elected in 2024	Party
Broadland and Fakenham	Jerome Mayhew	Conservative
Great Yarmouth	Rupert Lowe	Restore
Norwich North	Alice Macdonald	Labour
Norwich South	Clive Lewis	Labour
North Norfolk	Steffan Aquarone	Liberal Democrats
South Norfolk	Ben Goldsborough	Labour
Mid Norfolk	George Freeman	Conservative
North West Norfolk	James Wild	Conservative
South West Norfolk	Terry Jermy	Labour
Waveney Valley	Adrian Ramsay	Green

In the 1945 United Kingdom general election, all seats in Norfolk were won by the Labour Party and the National Liberal Party.

In the 2010 general election seven seats were held by the Conservatives and two by the Liberal Democrats. The Labour Party no longer held the urban constituencies they once held in Norwich North and Great Yarmouth, leaving them with no MPs in the whole of East Anglia; the former Labour Home Secretary Charles Clarke was a high level casualty of that election.

In the 2015 general election seven seats were won by the Conservative Party, with Labour winning Norwich South and the Liberal Democrats winning North Norfolk.

In the 2017 general election the 2015 result was repeated.

In the 2024 general election, Norfolk became the only county in the United Kingdom to be represented by MPs from five different parties.

=== Norwich unitary authority dispute (2006–2010) ===
In October 2006, the Department for Communities and Local Government produced a local government White Paper inviting councils to submit proposals for unitary restructuring. In January 2007 Norwich submitted its proposal, but this was rejected in December 2007 as it did not meet the criteria for acceptance. In February 2008, the Boundary Committee for England (from 1 April 2010 incorporated in the Local Government Boundary Commission for England) was asked to consider alternative proposals for the whole or part of Norfolk, including whether Norwich should become a unitary authority, separate from Norfolk County Council. In December 2009, the Boundary Committee recommended a single unitary authority covering all of Norfolk, including Norwich.

However, on 10 February 2010, it was announced that, contrary to the December 2009 recommendation of the Boundary Committee, Norwich would be given separate unitary status. The proposed change was strongly resisted, principally by Norfolk County Council and the Conservative opposition in Parliament. Reacting to the announcement, Norfolk County Council issued a statement that it would seek leave to challenge the decision in the courts. A letter was leaked to the local media in which the Permanent Secretary for the Department for Communities and Local Government noted that the decision did not meet all the criteria and that the risk of it "being successfully challenged in judicial review proceedings is very high". The Shadow Local Government and Planning Minister, Bob Neill, stated that should the Conservative Party win the 2010 general election, they would reverse the decision.

Following the 2010 general election, Eric Pickles was appointed Secretary of State for Communities and Local Government on 12 May 2010 in a Conservative–Liberal Democrat coalition government. According to press reports, he instructed his department to take urgent steps to reverse the decision and maintain the status quo in line with the Conservative Party manifesto. However, the unitary plans were supported by the Liberal Democrat group on the city council, and by Simon Wright, Lib Dem MP for Norwich South, who intended to lobby the party leadership to allow the changes to go ahead.

The Local Government Act 2010 to reverse the unitary decision for Norwich (and Exeter and Suffolk) received royal assent on 16 December 2010. The disputed award of unitary status had meanwhile been referred to the High Court, and on 21 June 2010 the court (Mr. Justice Ouseley, judge) ruled it unlawful, and revoked it. The city has therefore failed to attain unitary status, and the two-tier arrangement of county and district councils (with Norwich City Council counted among the latter) remains as of 2017.

=== Upcoming local government reorganisation ===
In March 2026, the government announced local government reorganisation plans, which would have seen local government across Norfolk reorganised in 2028 into three unitary authorities. These proposals were withdrawn in September 2026.

Separate proposals for a new Norfolk and Suffolk Combined County Authority covering Norfolk and Suffolk remain under consideration.

== Emergency services ==
- Norfolk Fire and Rescue Service
- East of England Ambulance Service
- East Anglian Air Ambulance
- Norfolk Constabulary
- British Transport Police
- HM Coastguard

== Settlements ==
Flag of Norwich

Norfolk's county town and only city is Norwich, one of the largest settlements in England during the Norman era. Norwich is home to the University of East Anglia, and is the county's main business and culture centre. Other principal towns include the port town of King's Lynn and the seaside resort and Broads gateway town of Great Yarmouth.

Based on the 2011 census the county's largest centres of population are: Norwich (213,166), Great Yarmouth (63,434), King's Lynn (46,093), Thetford (24,883), Dereham (20,651), Wymondham (13,587), North Walsham (12,463), Attleborough (10,549), Downham Market (9,994), Diss (9,829), Fakenham (8,285), Cromer (7,749), Sheringham (7,367) and Swaffham (7,258). There are also several smaller market towns: Aylsham (6,016), Harleston (4,458) and Holt (3,810).

Much of the county remains rural in nature and Norfolk is believed to have around 200 lost settlements which have been largely or totally depopulated since the medieval period. These include places lost to coastal erosion, agricultural enclosure, depopulation and the establishment of the Stanford Training Area in 1940.

== Transport ==
=== Roads ===
Norfolk is one of the few counties in England that does not have a motorway. The A11 connects Norfolk to Cambridge and London, via the M11. From the west, there are only two routes from Norfolk that provide a direct link with the A1: the A47 to the East Midlands and Birmingham, via Peterborough, and the A17 to the East Midlands, via Lincolnshire. These two routes both meet at King's Lynn, which is also the starting point of the A10, providing West Norfolk with a direct link with London, via Ely, Cambridge and Hertford.

=== Railways ===
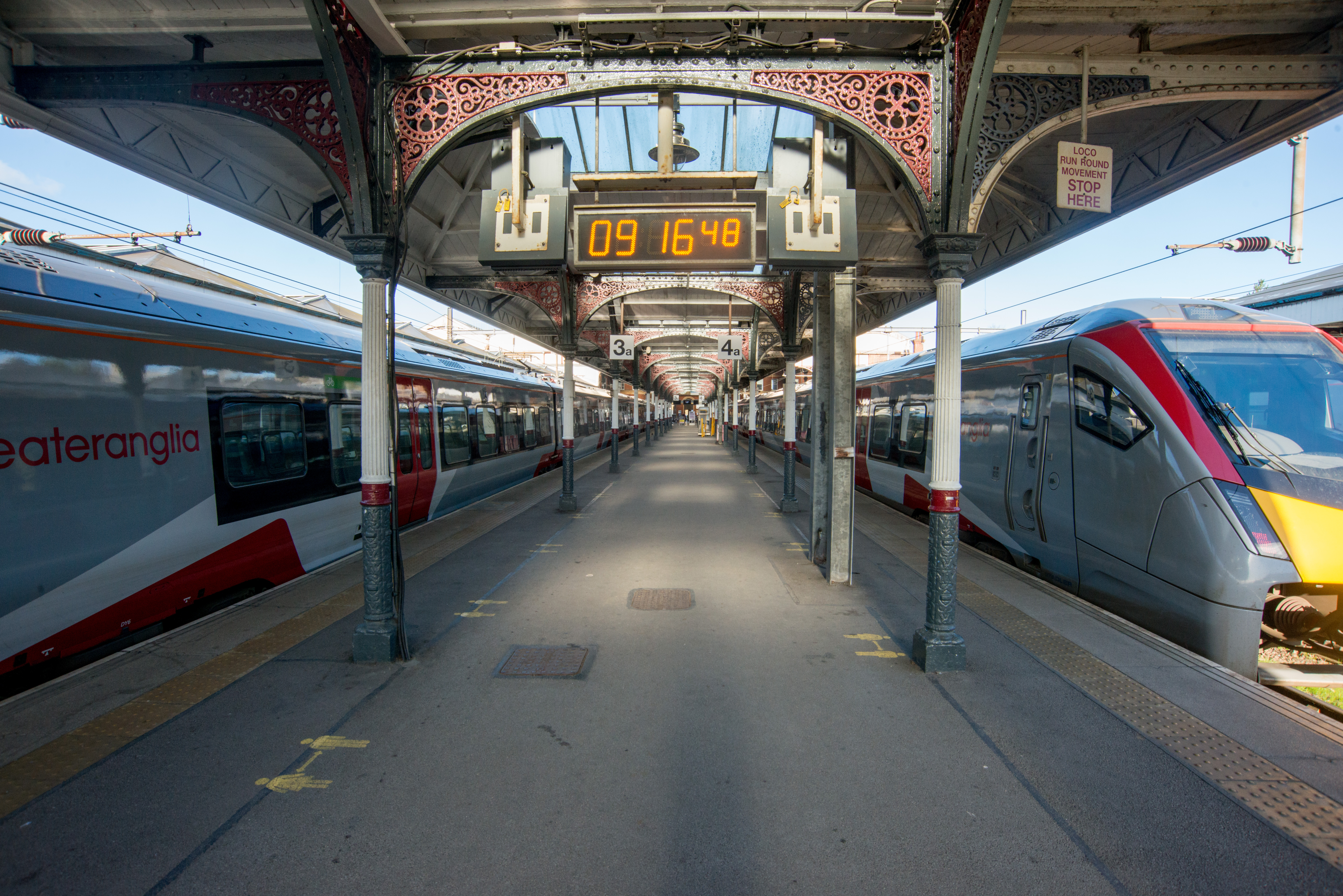
Norwich railway station

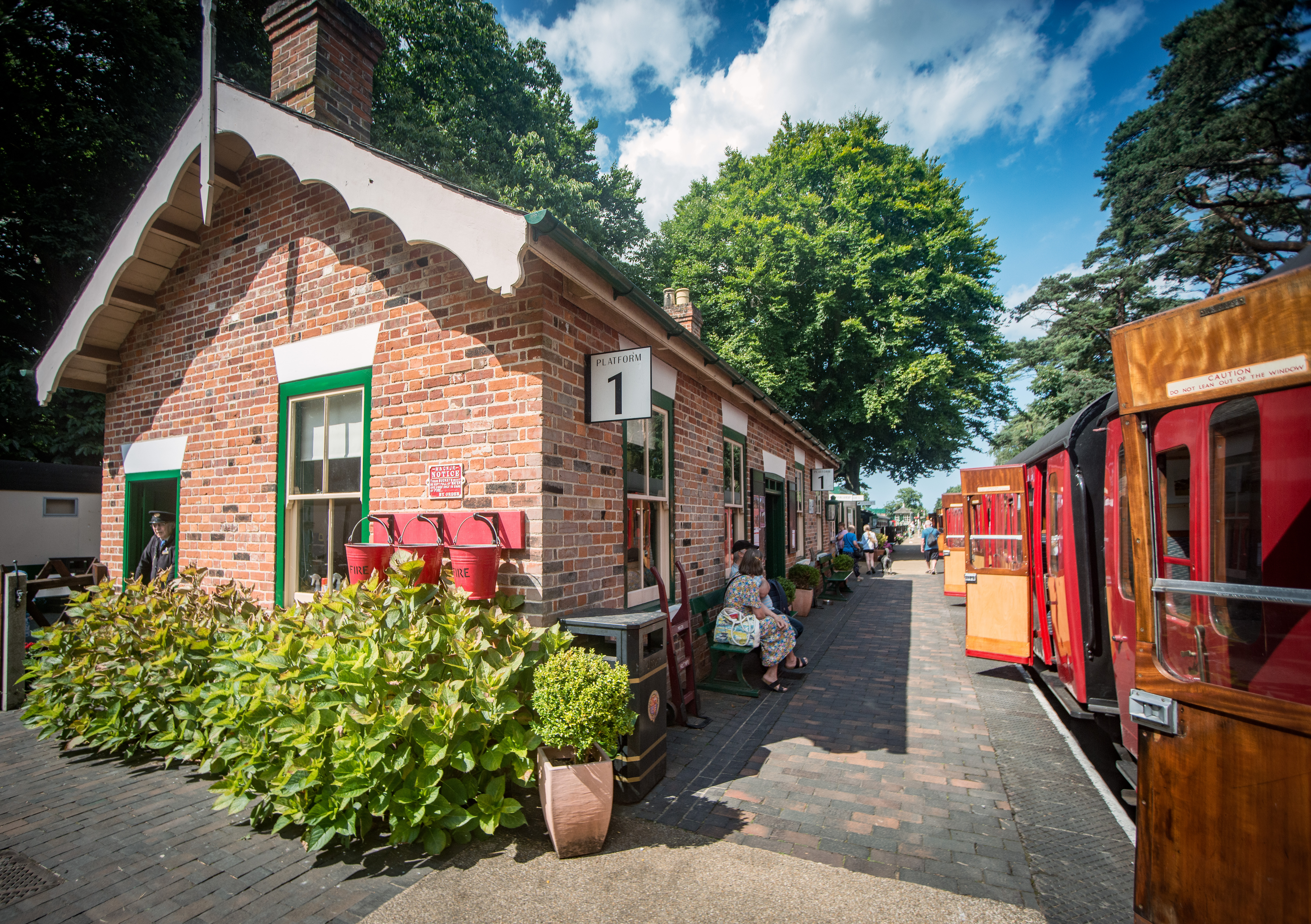
Holt railway station

There are two main railway lines that link Norfolk with London. The Great Eastern Main Line hosts inter-city services from Norwich to London Liverpool Street, via Ipswich and Colchester. The Fen line provides regular services between King's Lynn and London King's Cross, via Ely and Cambridge.

In addition, the Breckland line provides access from Norwich and Thetford to destinations to the west including Peterborough, Nottingham, Sheffield, Manchester Piccadilly and Liverpool Lime Street.

=== Air ===
Norwich Airport provides flights to various European destinations, including a link to Amsterdam Airport Schiphol which offers onward flights throughout the world.

== Dialect, accent and nickname ==
The Norfolk dialect, sometimes referred to as "Broad Norfolk," has gradually declined over the modern era. Much of its distinctive vocabulary and many traditional phrases have disappeared due to factors such as the influence of radio, television, and migration from other parts of the country. Today, Norfolk speech is often regarded more as a regional accent than a separate dialect, although it retains some distinctive grammatical features.

People from Norfolk are sometimes known as Norfolk Dumplings, an allusion to the flour dumplings that were traditionally a significant part of the local diet.

More cutting, perhaps, was the alleged pejorative medical slang term "normal for Norfolk", alluding to the county's perceived status as a quirky rustic backwater due to a high level of inbreeding among residents.

== Tourism ==
Norfolk is a popular tourist destination and has several major holiday attractions. There are many seaside resorts, including some of the finest British beaches, such as those at Great Yarmouth, Cromer and Holkham. Norfolk contains the Broads and other areas of outstanding natural beauty and many areas of the coast are wild bird sanctuaries and reserves with some areas designated as protected landscapes such as the Norfolk Coast AONB.

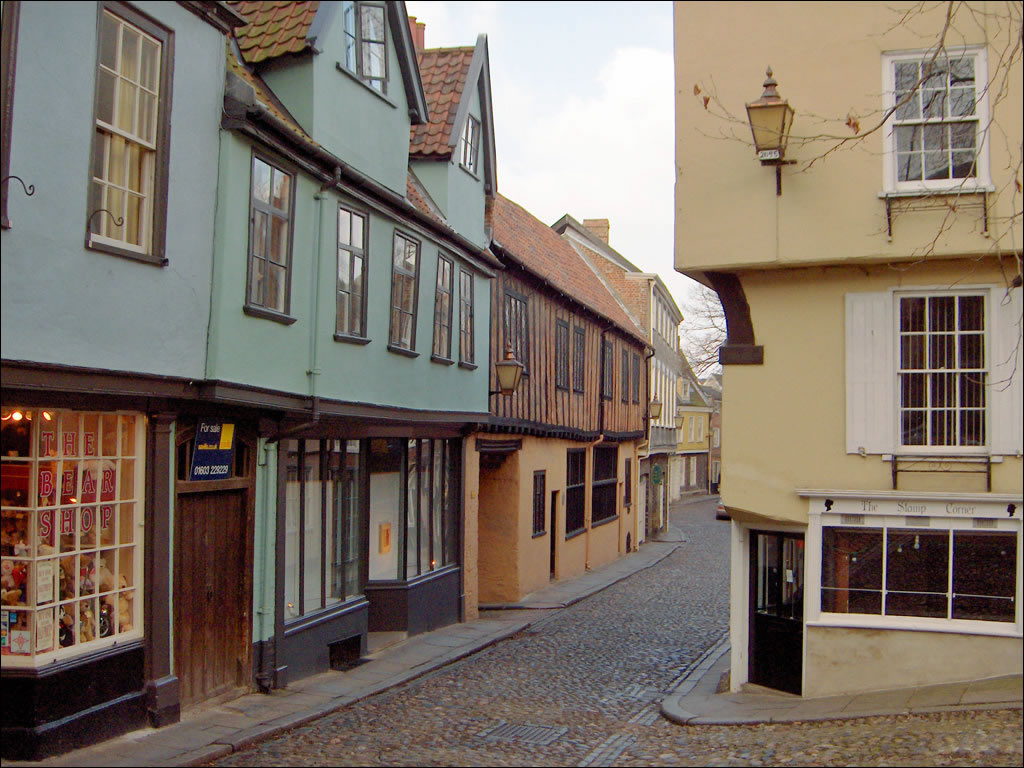
Elm Hill in the historic city of Norwich

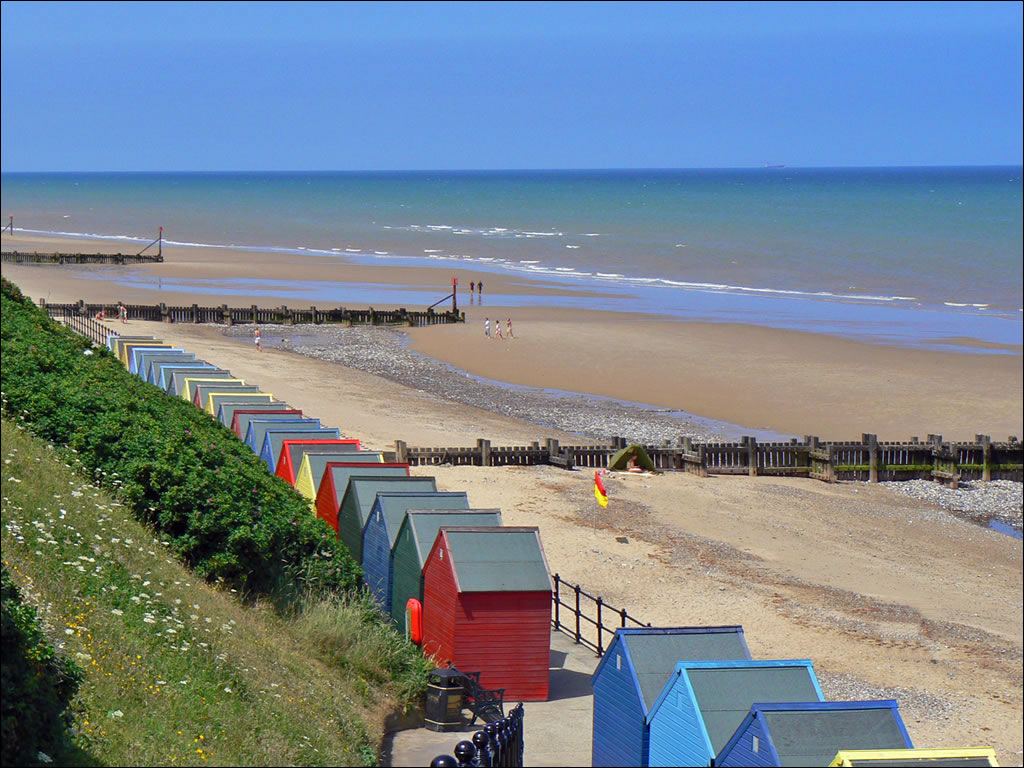
The Norfolk Coast in the little village of Mundesley near Cromer

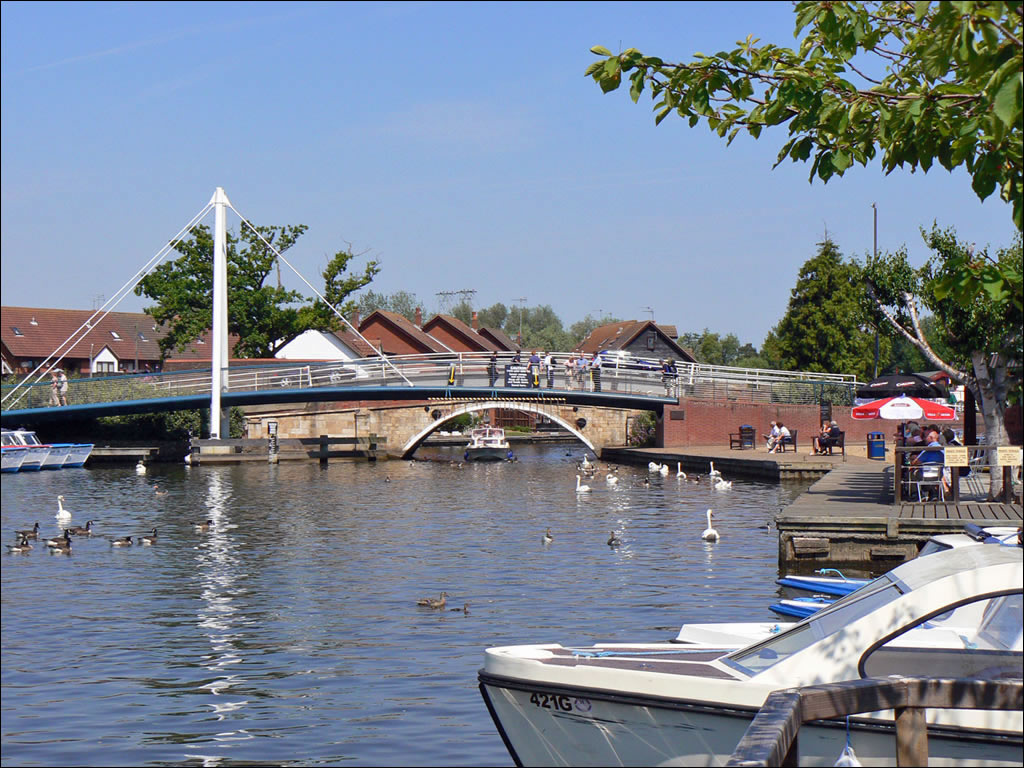
The bridge at Wroxham

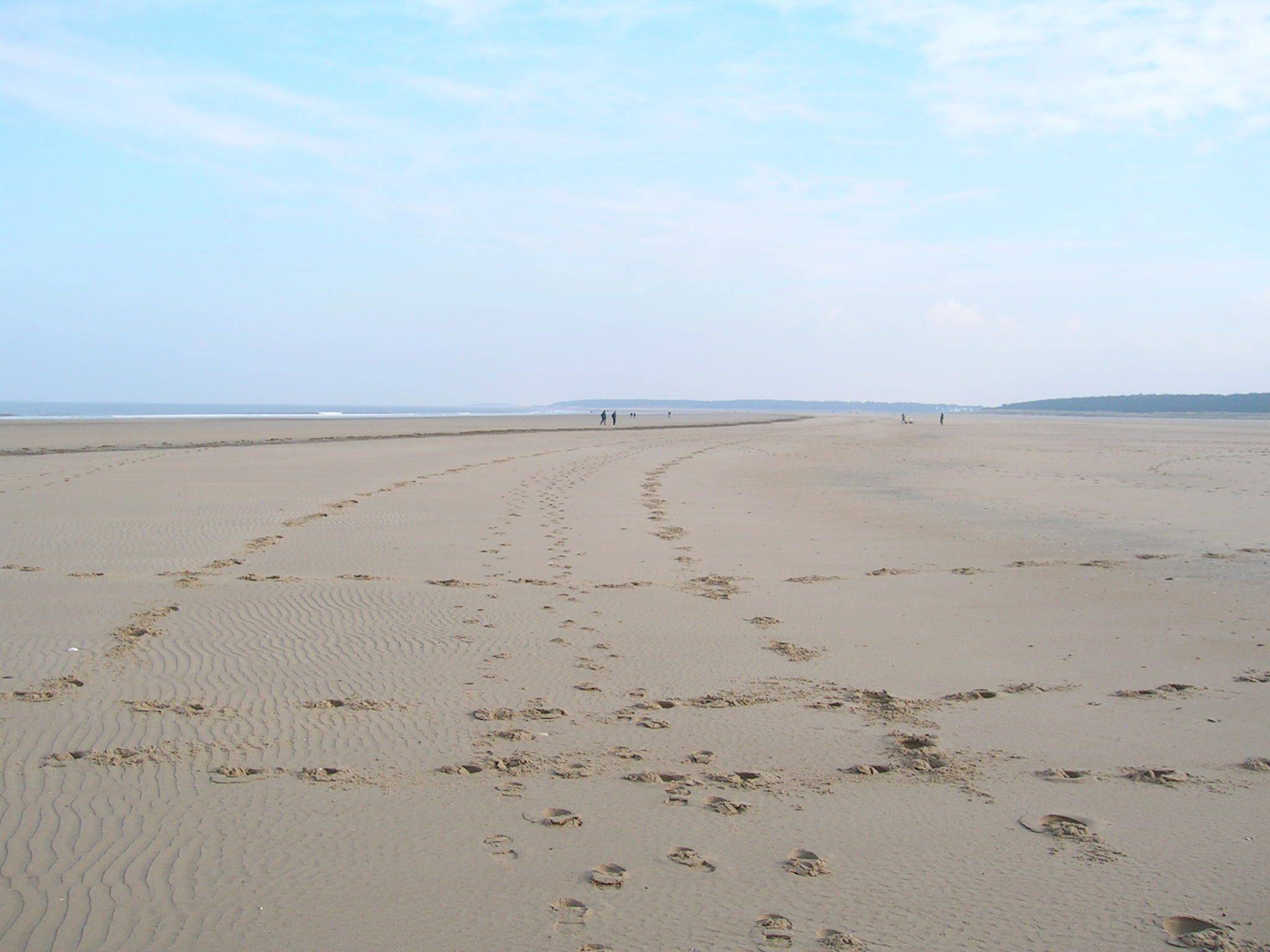
The beach at Holkham National Nature Reserve

Charles III's residence at Sandringham House in Sandringham provides a year-round tourist attraction whilst the coast and some rural areas are popular locations for people from the conurbations to purchase weekend holiday homes. Arthur Conan Doyle first conceived the idea for The Hound of the Baskervilles whilst holidaying in Cromer with Bertram Fletcher Robinson, after hearing local folklore tales regarding the mysterious hound known as Black Shuck.

=== Amusement parks and zoos ===
Norfolk has several amusement parks and zoos.

- Thrigby Hall near Great Yarmouth was built in 1736 by Joshua Smith Esquire and features a zoo which houses a large tiger enclosure, primate enclosures and the swamp house which has many crocodiles and alligators.
- Holkham Hall is an 18th-century stately home and visitor attraction, constructed in the Palladian style and at the centre of a 3,000-acre deer park on the North Norfolk coast with a woodland play area, walled garden and farming exhibition.
- Roarr! Dinosaur Adventure (formerly Dinosaur Adventure) is a dinosaur themed adventure park in Lenwade. It is set in 85 acres of parkland and has a dinosaur trail, indoor play area, high ropes course and outdoor water play area.
- Great Yarmouth Pleasure Beach is a free-entry theme park, hosting over twenty large rides as well as a crazy golf course, water attractions, children's rides and the UK's oldest scenic wooden roller coaster.
- BeWILDerwood is an adventure park situated in the Norfolk Broads and is the setting for the book A Boggle at BeWILDerwood by local children's author Tom Blofeld.
- Britannia Pier on the coast of Great Yarmouth has rides which include a ghost train. Also on the pier is the famous Britannia Pier Theatre.
- Banham Zoo is set amongst 35 acres (14 ha) of parkland and gardens with enclosures for animals including big cats, birds of prey, siamangs and shire horses. Its annual visitor attendance is in excess of 200,000 people.
- Pensthorpe Nature Reserve, near the town of Fakenham in north Norfolk, is a nature reserve with many captive birds and animals. Such species include native birds such as lapwing and Eurasian crane, to much more exotic examples like Marabou stork, Greater flamingo, and Manchurian crane. The site played host to the BBC's Springwatch from 2008 until 2010. A number of human-made lakes are home to a range of wild birds, and provide stop-off points for many wintering ducks and geese.
- The Sea Life Centre in Great Yarmouth is one of the biggest sea life centres in the country. The Great Yarmouth centre is home to a tropical shark display, one resident of which is Britain's biggest shark 'Nobby' the Nurse Shark. The same display, with its walk-through underwater tunnel, also features the wreckage of a World War II aircraft. The centre also includes over 50 native species including shrimps, starfish, sharks, stingrays and conger eels.
- The Sea Life Sanctuary in Hunstanton is Norfolk's leading marine rescue centre and works both as a visitor attraction as well as a location for rescuing and rehabilitating sick and injured sea creatures found in the nearby Wash and North Sea. The attraction's main features are similar to those of the Sea Life Centre in Great Yarmouth, albeit on a slightly smaller scale.

=== Theatres ===
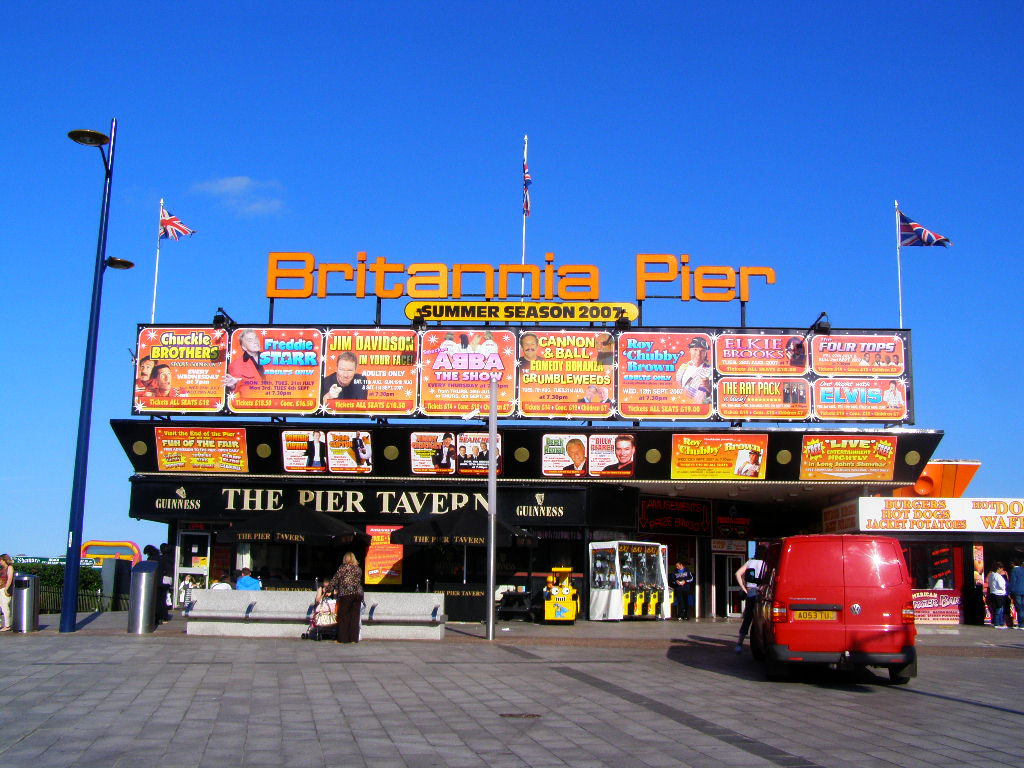
Britannia Pier

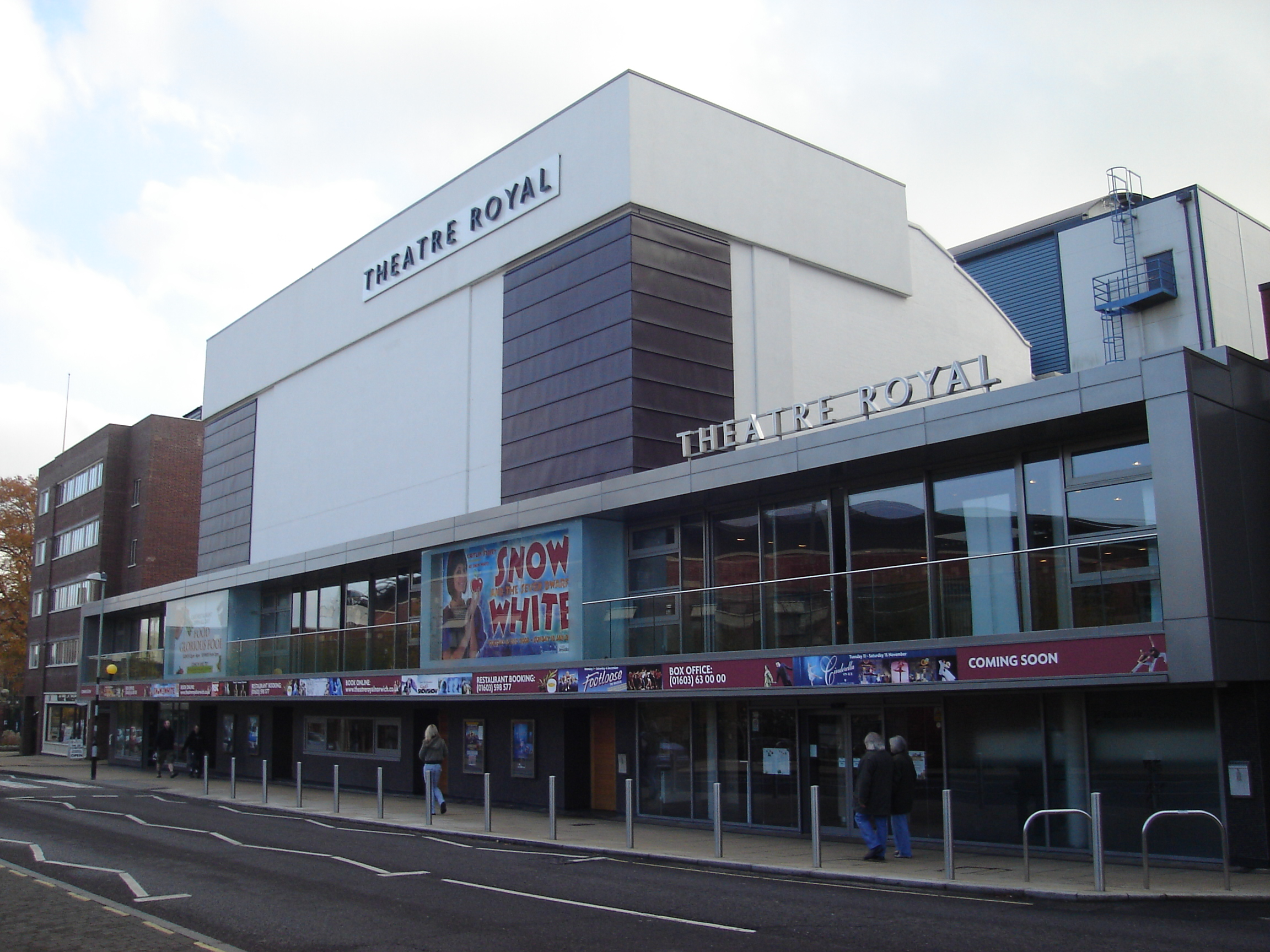
Theatre Royal

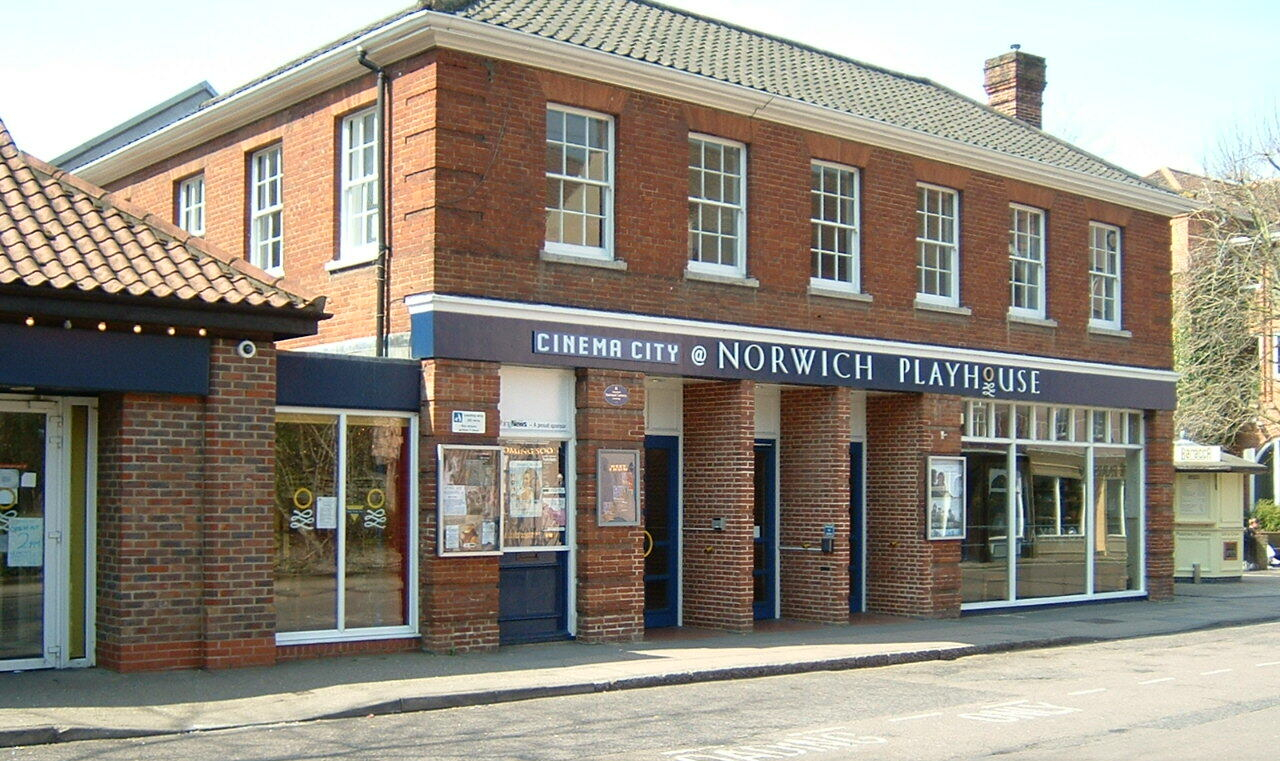
Norwich Playhouse

The Pavilion Theatre is a 510-seater venue on the end of Cromer Pier, best known for hosting the 'end-of-the-pier' show, the Seaside Special. The theatre also presents comedy, music, dance, opera, musicals and community shows.

The Britannia Pier Theatre (Great Yarmouth) mainly hosts popular comedy acts such as the Chuckle Brothers and Jim Davidson. The theatre has 1,200 seats and is one of the largest in Norfolk.

The Theatre Royal in Norwich has been on its present site for over 250 years, having been authorised by the Norwich Theatre Act 1768 (8 Geo. 3. c. 28). The 1,300-seat theatre, the largest in the city, hosts a mix of national touring productions including musicals, dance, drama, family shows, stand-up comedians, opera and pop.

The Norwich Playhouse hosts theatre, comedy, music and other performing arts. It has a seating capacity of 300.

The Maddermarket Theatre in Norwich opened in 1921 and was the first permanent recreation of an Elizabethan theatre. The founder was Nugent Monck who had worked with William Poel. The theatre has a seating capacity of 312.

The Norwich Puppet Theatre was founded in 1979 by Ray and Joan DaSilva as a permanent base for their touring company and opened to the public in 1980, following the conversion of the medieval church of St James in central Norwich. Under subsequent artistic directors, Barry Smith and Luis Z. Boy, the theatre developed its current programme of performances and activities. It is one of the few British theatres dedicated solely to puppetry and houses a 185-seat raked auditorium, a 50-seat Octagon Studio, workshops, an exhibition gallery, shop, and licensed bar. It remains the only venue in the East of England offering a year-round programme of family-oriented puppet performances.

The Garage studio theatre (Norwich) can seat up to 110 people in a range of different layouts. It can also be used for standing events and can accommodate up to 180 people.

The Platform Theatre (Norwich) is in the grounds of City College Norwich (CCN), and has a large stage with raked seating for an audience of around 200. The theatre plays host to performances by both student and professional companies.

The Sewell Barn Theatre (Norwich) is the smallest theatre in Norwich and has a seating capacity of 100. The auditorium features raked seating on three sides of an open acting space.

The Norwich Arts Centre (Norwich) theatre opened in 1977 in St. Benedict's Street, and has a capacity of 290.

The Princess Theatre (Hunstanton) stands overlooking the Wash and the green in the East Coast resort of Hunstanton. It is a 472-seat venue. Open all year round, the theatre plays host to a wide variety of shows from comedy to drama, celebrity shows to music for all tastes and children's productions. It has a six-week summer season plus an annual Christmas pantomime.

Sheringham Little Theatre has seating for 180. The theatre programmes a variety of plays, musicals and music, and also shows films.

The Gorleston Pavilion is an original Edwardian building with a seating capacity of 300, situated on the Norfolk coast. The theatre stages plays, pantomimes, musicals and concerts as well as a 26-week summer season.

== Demography ==
According to estimates by the Office for National Statistics, the population of Norfolk in 2018 was 903,680, split almost evenly between males and females. Roughly 24.3% of the population was aged 65 or older, compared to 18.2% for the whole of England.

Population of Norfolk by ethnic category
Ethnic category	Norfolk		East of England		England (total)	
Asian/Asian British	13,017	1.5%	278,372	4.8%	4,143,403	7.8%
Black/African/Caribbean/Black British	4,609	0.5%	117,442	2%	1,846,614	3.5%
Mixed/multiple ethnic groups	10,027	1.2%	112,116	1.9%	1,192,879	2.3%
Other ethnic group	2,217	0.3%	28,841	0.5%	548,418	1.0%
English	828,018	96.5%	5,310,194	90.8%	45,281,142	85.4%

== Notable people ==
=== From Norfolk ===
- George VI, King/Emperor of the United Kingdom. Born and died on the Sandringham estate
- Joseph Ames, naval commander. Born and lived in Great Yarmouth
- Joseph Ames, bibliographer and antiquary. Born in Great Yarmouth
- Hannah Amond, pop singer from Norwich.
- Diana Athill, literary editor and author, South Norfolk and Ditchingham
- Alexander Baker (Jesuit), missionary to India
- Peter Bellamy, folk singer and musician, who was brought up in North Norfolk
- Henry Blofeld, Cricket commentator
- Henry Blogg, the UK's most decorated lifeboatman, who was from Cromer
- Francis Blomefield, Anglican rector, early topographical historian of Norfolk
- James Blunt, English acoustic folk rock singer-songwriter who was raised in Norfolk during his childhood
- Boudica, scourge of the occupying Roman Army in first century Britain and queen of the Iceni, British tribe occupying an area slightly larger than modern Norfolk
- Martin Brundle, former motor racing driver and now a commentator was born in King's Lynn
- Edward Bulwer-Lytton, 1st Baron Lytton, writer, born at Heydon
- George Russell (racing driver), Formula 1 driver, born in Kings Lynn, and educated at Wisbech grammar school.
- Dave Bussey, former BBC Radio 2 and former BBC Radio Lincolnshire presenter
- Caroline Butler, English TikToker
- Michael Carroll (29 March 1983–) lottery winner
- Howard Carter, archaeologist who discovered Tutankhamun's tomb; his childhood was spent primarily in Swaffham
- Edith Cavell, a nurse executed by the Germans for aiding the escape of prisoners in World War I
- Sam Claflin, actor, grew up in Norwich and studied at Costessey High School
- Sam Clemmett, actor, from Brundall known for starring in West End stage play Harry Potter and the Cursed Child, Haribo Tangfastics television advert and the BBC documentary Murder Games: The Life and Death of Breck Bednar where he played Breck Bednar the teen murdered by Lewis Daynes
- Edward Coke, 17th-century jurist and author of the Petition of Right was born in Mileham and educated at Norwich School
- Olivia Colman, actress, born and educated in Norfolk
- Jamie Cutter, co-founder of Cutter & Buck, America's largest golf apparel providers, born in Norwich
- Cathy Dennis, singer and songwriter, from Norwich
- Diana, Princess of Wales, first wife of King Charles III, was born and grew up in Park House near the Sandringham estate
- Charles Spencer, 9th Earl Spencer brother of Diana, Princess of Wales and maternal uncle to William, Prince of Wales and Prince Harry, Duke of Sussex
- Anthony Duckworth-Chad, landowner and Deputy Lord Lieutenant of Norfolk
- Sir James Dyson, inventor and entrepreneur, was born at Cromer, grew up at Holt and was educated at Gresham's School
- Bill (1916–1986), Brian (1922–2009), Eric (1914–1993), Geoff (1918–2004), John (1937–2020), and Justin Edrich (1961–), cricketers
- Nathan Fake, electronic dance music producer/DJ
- Pablo Fanque, equestrian and popular Victorian circus proprietor, whose 1843 poster advertisement inspired The Beatles song, Being for the Benefit of Mr. Kite!, born in Norwich
- Natasha and Ralph Firman, racing drivers, were both born and brought up in Norfolk and educated at Gresham's School
- Caroline Flack, television presenter, who grew up in East Wretham and went to school in Watton
- Margaret Fountaine, butterfly collector, was born in Norfolk, and her collection is housed in Norwich Castle Museum
- Elizabeth Fry, prominent 19th century Quaker prison reformer pictured on the Bank of England £5 note, born and raised in Norwich
- Stephen Fry, actor, comedian, writer, producer, director and author who was brought up in the village of Booton near Reepham. He now has a second home near King's Lynn
- Samuel Fuller, signed the Mayflower Compact
- William Gooderham Sr. (29 August 1790 – 20 August 1881) was an English distiller, businessman, and banker. He was a founder of the Gooderham and Worts distillery in Toronto, Canada.
- Claire Goose, actress who starred in Casualty, was raised in Norfolk
- Ed Graham, drummer of Lowestoft band The Darkness, was born in Great Yarmouth
- Sienna Guillory, actress, from north Norfolk, who was educated at Gresham's School
- Henry Rider Haggard, novelist, author of She, King Solomon's Mines, born Bradenham 1856 and lived after his marriage at Ditchingham
- Lilias Rider Haggard, daughter of Henry Rider Haggard and author of books about Norfolk
- Lauren Hemp, footballer for England, part of the squad that won the UEFA Women's Euro 2022, was born in North Walsham and played for Norwich City Women FC
- Jake Humphrey, BBC presenter, spent most of his childhood in Norwich
- Andy Hunt, footballer, grew up in Ashill.
- Julian of Norwich, mediaeval mystic, born probably in Norwich in 1342; lived much of her life as a recluse in Norwich
- Margery Kempe, mediaeval mystic, born in King's Lynn
- Robert Kett, leader of Kett's Rebellion in East Anglia 1549, from Wymondham
- R. W. Ketton-Cremer, Norfolk historian and former owner of Felbrigg Hall
- Sid Kipper, Norfolk humourist, author, songwriter and singer
- Myleene Klass, former Hear'Say singer, comes from the Gorleston-on-Sea area of Great Yarmouth
- Holly Lerski, singer and songwriter, former member of the band Angelou, grew up and resides in Norfolk
- Henry Leslie, actor and playwright, born 1830 at Walsoken
- Samuel Lincoln, ancestor of US president Abraham Lincoln
- Matthew Macfadyen, actor who starred in Spooks, was born in Great Yarmouth
- Kenneth McKee, surgeon who pioneered hip replacement surgery techniques, lived in Tacolneston
- Danny Mills, footballer, born in Norwich
- Sir John Mills, actor, born in North Elmham
- R. H. Mottram, author and former Lord Mayor of Norwich
- Horatio, Lord Nelson, Admiral and British hero who played a major role in the Battle of Trafalgar, born and schooled in Norfolk
- Nimmo Twins, sketch comedy duo well known in Norfolk
- King Olav V of Norway, born at Flitcham on the Sandringham estate
- Beth Orton, singer-songwriter, was born in Dereham and raised in Norwich
- Thomas Paine, philosopher, born in Thetford
- Ronan Parke, Britain's Got Talent 2011 finalist and runner up
- Margaret Paston, author of many of the Paston Letters, born 1423, lived at Gresham
- Barry Pinches, snooker player who comes from Norwich
- Matthew Pinsent, Olympic champion rower, was born in Holt
- Prasutagus, 1st-century king of the Iceni, who occupied roughly the area which is now Norfolk
- Philip Pullman, author, born in Norwich
- Miranda Raison, actress, from north Norfolk, who was educated at Gresham's School
- Anna Sewell, writer, author of Black Beauty, born at Great Yarmouth, lived part of her life at Old Catton near Norwich and buried at Lamas, near Buxton
- Thomas Shadwell, playwright, satirist and Poet Laureate
- Allan Smethurst, 'The Singing Postman' who sang songs in his Norfolk dialect, was from Sheringham
- Hannah Spearritt, actress and former S Club 7 singer, who is from the Gorleston-on-Sea area of Great Yarmouth
- Roger Taylor, drummer of the rock band Queen was born in King's Lynn and spent the early part of his childhood in Norfolk
- Adam Thoroughgood, colonial leader in Virginia, namer of New Norfolk County, which later became Norfolk, Virginia
- Peter Trudgill, sociolinguist specialising in accents and dialects including his own native Norfolk dialect, was born and bred in Norwich
- George Vancouver, born King's Lynn. Captain and explorer in the Royal Navy
- Stella Vine, English artist, spent many of her early years in Norwich
- Sir Robert Walpole, first Earl of Orford, regarded as the first British prime minister
- Tim Westwood, rap DJ and BBC Radio presenter, grew up in and around Norwich
- Parson Woodforde, 18th century clergyman and diarist
- Nick Youngs (1959–) and his two sons, Ben (1989–) and Tom (1987–) were both raised close to the town of Aylsham on their father's farm. Youngs is a former rugby union player for Leicester Tigers and England. Both sons went on to represent the national rugby union team.

=== Associated with Norfolk ===
The following people were not born or brought up in Norfolk but are long-term residents of Norfolk, are well known for living in Norfolk at some point in their lives, or have contributed in some significant way to the county.

- Verily Anderson (1915–2010), writer, lived in North Norfolk
- Stuart Ashen, comedian, animator, actor and online reviewer, born and lives in Norfolk
- Julian Assange, Australian publisher, journalist, writer, computer programmer, Internet activist and editor in chief of WikiLeaks, lived in Ellingham Hall, the mansion of Vaughan Smith, under house arrest whilst fighting extradition to Sweden from December 2010 to December 2011
- Peter Baker (1921–1966), British Conservative MP for South Norfolk
- Mary Bristow (1781–1805), landscape gardener, owner of Quidenham Hall
- Bill Bryson, writer, has lived in the county since 2003
- Adam Buxton, comedian and one half of Adam and Joe, moved to Norfolk in 2008
- Richard Condon (1937–1991), Theatre Royal, Norwich and Pavilion Theatre, Cromer Pier manager
- Revd Richard Enraght (1837–1898), 19th century clergyman, religious controversialist, Rector of St Swithun, Bintree
- Liza Goddard TV and stage actress, lives in the village of Syderstone
- Trisha Goddard, TV personality, lives in Norwich and writes a column in the local newspaper the Eastern Daily Press
- Roderick Gordon, writer of Tunnels series, lives in North Norfolk
- Adriana Hunter, translator of French novels, lives in Norfolk
- John Major, British prime minister from 1990 to 1997, has a holiday home in Weybourne
- Alan Partridge, fictional tongue-in-cheek media personality portrayed by Steve Coogan. His feature film Alan Partridge: Alpha Papa was set, filmed and had its world premiere in Norwich in 2013
- Pocahontas (c. 1596–1617), who lived at Heacham Hall for part of her life when she was married to John Rolfe
- Martin Shaw, stage, television and film actor, is based in Norfolk
- Delia Smith, cookery writer and major Norwich City Football Club shareholder
- Liz Truss, who was MP for South West Norfolk 2010-2024 and prime minister for 49 days in 2022, had home in Thetford during that time
- John Wilson (1943–2018), angler, writer and broadcaster

== Gallery ==
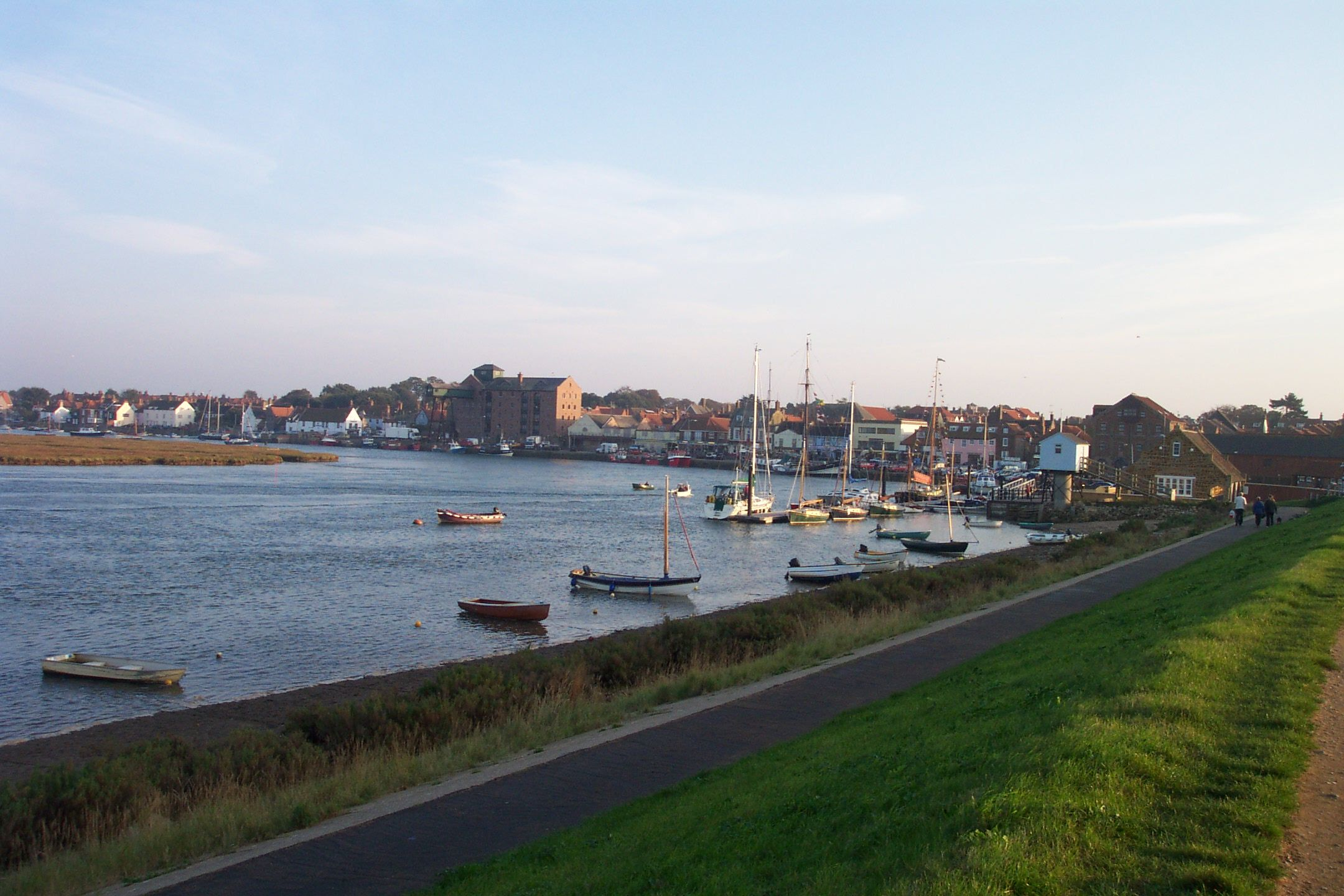
Wells-next-the-Sea

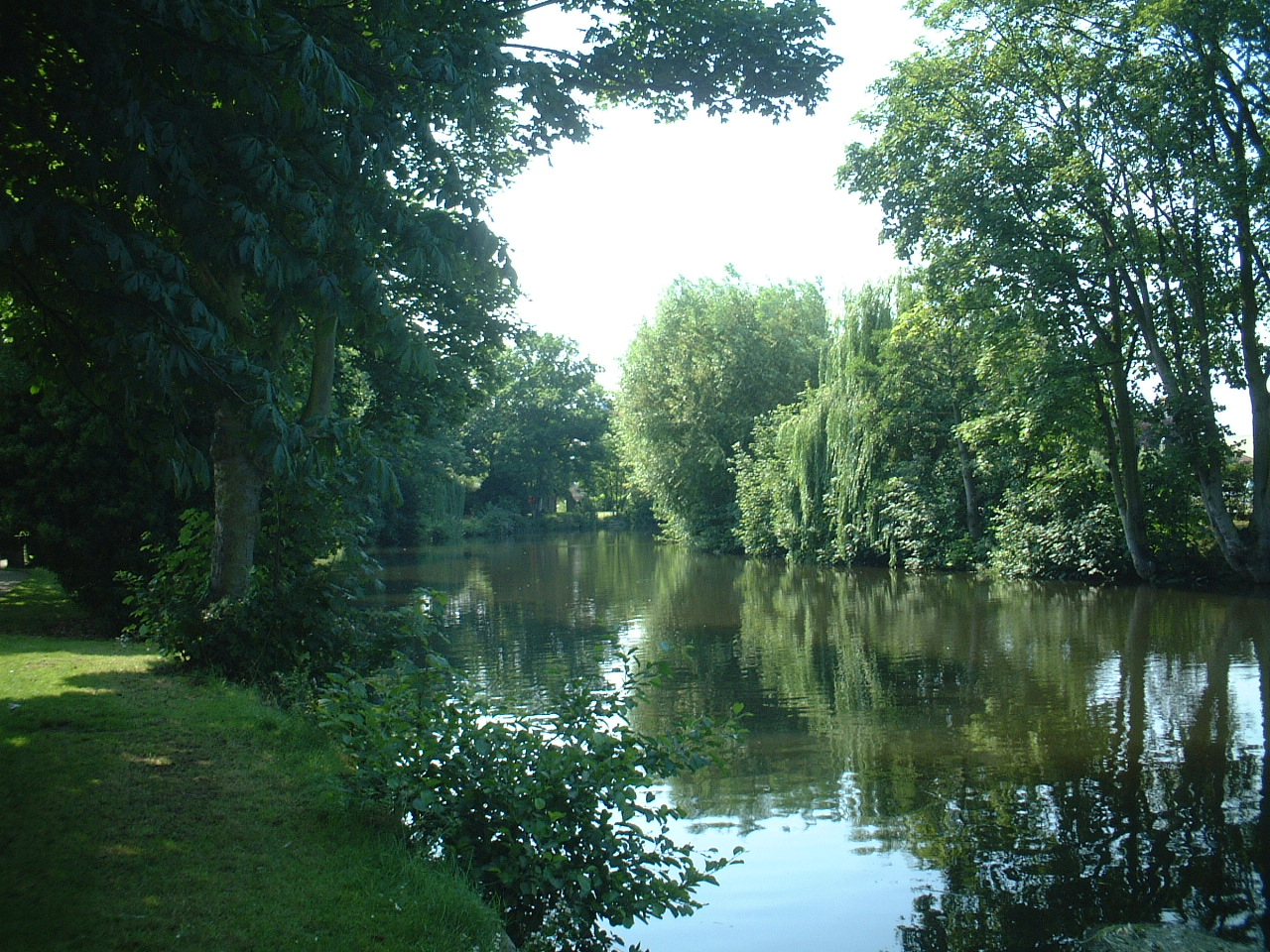
River Wensum, Norwich

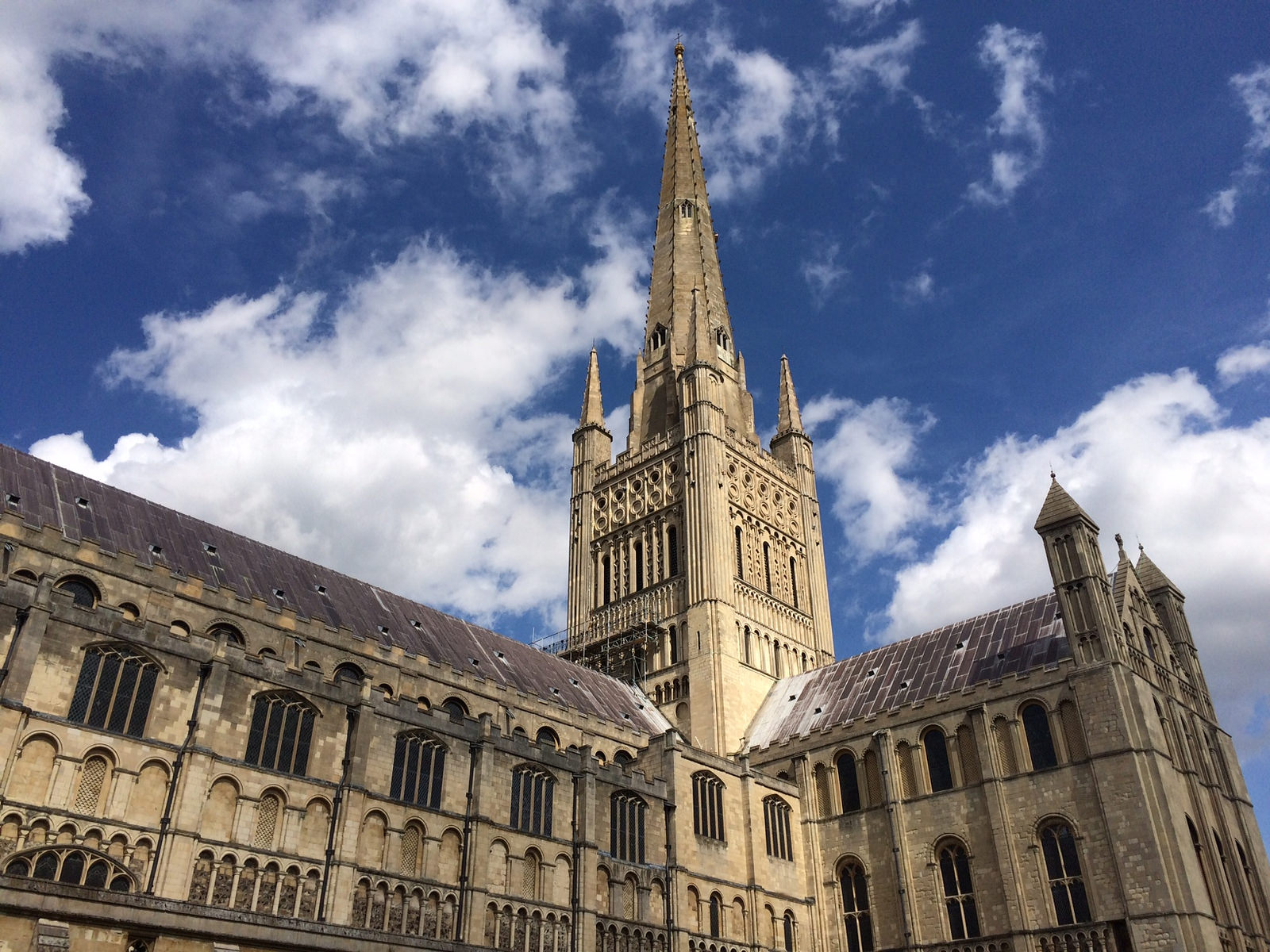
Norwich Cathedral: spire and south transept

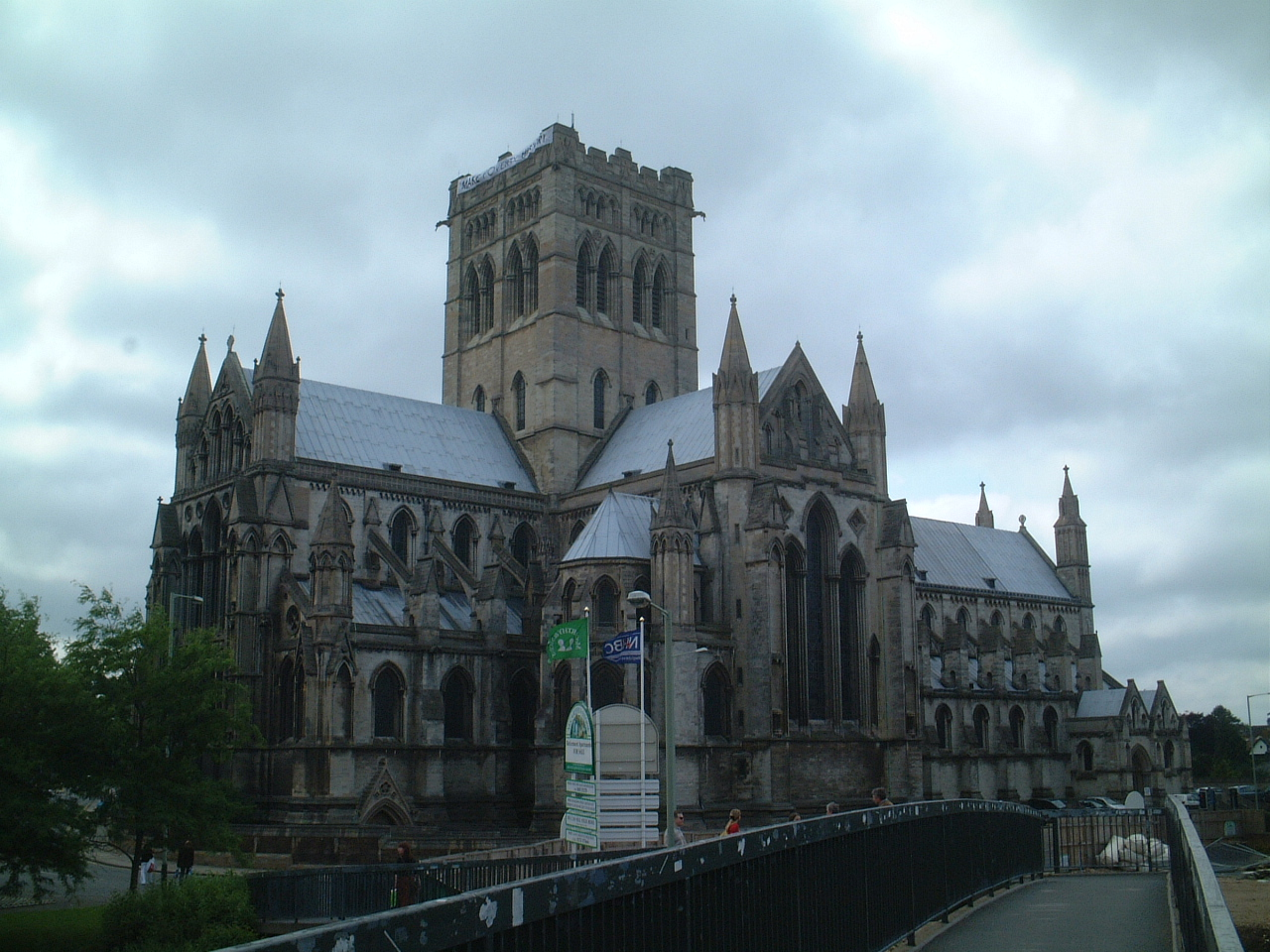
St John the Baptist Cathedral, Norwich

== See also ==
- Custos Rotulorum of Norfolk – List of Keepers of the Rolls
- Duke of Norfolk
- Earl of Norfolk
- Healthcare in Norfolk
- High Sheriff of Norfolk
- List of English and Welsh endowed schools (19th century)#Norfolk
- List of future transport developments in the East of England
- Norfolk (UK Parliament constituency) – List of MPs for the Norfolk constituency
- Norfolk Police and Crime Commissioner
- Norfolk Terrier
- Norwich Terrier
- Recreational walks in Norfolk
