= Holly Lerski =

English singer-songwriter

Holly Lerski (born Holly Elmhirst, 13 November 1969) is an English singer and songwriter known both for her work with Angelou and for her solo career.

== Biography ==
Coming to public attention in the late 1990s with folk rock band Angelou this UK based singer-songwriter has earned comparisons to Jeff Buckley. Her music was featured in the American TV show Close to Home and the indie film Fish Without a Bicycle, starring Jenna Mattison, Brian Austin Green and Jennifer Blanc.

Lerski was born in London, daughter of a sound engineer and ex-St Martins School of Art student. She grew up around music, and began playing guitar at the age of six.

When she was nine her family relocated to Norfolk. It was in this transitional period Lerski first began to write songs. Lerski played bass and guitar in bands throughout her teens and whilst studying at Art School. Upon graduation she joined folk rock band The Rainbyrds, and began songwriting and performing.

== Music career ==
Lerski formed Angelou with guitarist Jo Baker in 1996. They recorded their first demo in the winter of that year, which included a cover of the Leonard Cohen song "Hallelujah". Inspired by Jeff Buckley's version, Lerski had been a fan of Buckley's, corresponding with the artist. Local Norwich label Haven Records heard the demo and signed Angelou in the beginning of 1997, scheduling the release of the Hallelujah EP to coincide with a UK summer tour supporting Eddi Reader and Boo Hewerdine. "Hallelujah" came out a week after Jeff Buckley's untimely death.

In 1998, Angelou released their first album Automiracles. Now including drummer Phil Di Palma, the album was written by Lerski, and recorded in 10 days by producer Calum MacColl. The album featured guest vocals from Eddi Reader and Boo Hewerdine and received comparisons to The Sundays' debut Reading, Writing and Arithmetic.

Their second album While You Were Sleeping, released in 2000, received further acclaim and established Lerski as one of the new crop of up and coming female folk artists. Written and produced by Lerski, and recorded in studio down-time, the album finished with a moving tribute to Jeff Buckley. Lerski went on to contribute this to the Buckley documentary 'Amazing Grace'.

In 2001, Spanish label El Diablo released an Angelou compilation called Midnight Witcheries. Now joined by new drummer Cath Evans and bassist Anne Richardson, this record allowed the band to be heard for the first time throughout Europe. They completed two extensive tours of Spain, appearing on national TV and radio. They also went on to release a further EP and two videos.

On hearing of their success abroad, UK music independent giant Sanctuary Records offered Lerski a recording and publishing agreement and at the end of 2001 Lerski finally signed a major deal. Angelou were soon off on the road again, this time as a duo touring Scandinavia and Europe with John Hiatt & The Goners.

On their return from Europe the band went into rehearsals for the third album, staying in a wooden hunting lodge in Derbyshire. Recorded both in Denmark and Manchester throughout 2002, Life Is Beautiful was a much poppier record. It was finally released in 2003 under Lerski's own name. With the launch of the album came live dates with The Cranberries, Jason Mraz and Josh Rouse, and support from BBC Radio 2 and most notably Wake Up To Wogan producer Paul Walters. In 2004, after disagreements with Sanctuary over lack of promotion for the record, Lerski was forced to leave the label and her songs behind.

In the summer of 2004, tired of the music industry and following a break up, Lerski relocated to Manchester where she began to write new material with the intention of releasing on her own imprint Laundry Label. Greetings From N.Y. was Laundry's first release. Featuring on the cover a hand written postcard to Lerski from Jeff Buckley, 'Greetings' was a 'best of' CD showcasing Lerski and the band's music to date. BBC Radio 2's Wake Up To Wogan once again championed the record and "More Than A Storm" featured weekly on his show. Starbucks at the time was also featuring tracks from Life Is Beautiful on their in-store compilation.

By 2006, following the news that Sanctuary had been bought out by Universal Music Group, Lerski returned to Norwich to begin a new chapter.

== Solo career ==
Going it alone now, Lerski played her first solo date in New York's The Living Room in 2007. That same week "Hallelujah!" was featured in the finale episode of CBS TV drama Close to Home.

In September 2009, Lerski announced the launch of her own label, Laundry Label. From 2012 until 2014, she recorded a new album in her garden shed. The Wooden House was released on 1 June 2015.

The Daily Telegraph named The Wooden House as one of the best folk albums of 2015.

Lerski went on a US road trip writing songs in 2019. She recorded a selection of these at Johnny Lee Schell's Ultratone Studio with Bonnie Raitt bassist James 'Hutch' Hutchinson', Tony Braunagel and Diego 'El Twanguero' Garcia later that year.

'Home Is Your Shoulder' was the first single released in November 2020. In 2021 she released a double A side single with James 'Hutch' Hutchinson entitled 'Carmel/Mighty Big Sur'.

In 2022 she recorded her fifth album 'Sweet Decline'in Nashville with producer Matthew 'Truck' Roley and musicians Josh Hunt (drums), Alex McCollough (pedal steel), Abby Dees, Scott Roley, Kate Urmy, and Milwaukee SistaStrings Chauntee and Monique Ross.

'Chicago', the first single from the album, was released on January 26th, 2024.

'Tall Trees' was released February 23rd.

'Oh Cassy Run' was released March 29th.

'Sweet Decline', the single, was released 19th April.

'Sweet Decline', the album, was released 26th April.

== Discography ==
=== Albums ===
- Sweet Decline (2024)
- The Wooden House (2015)
- Greetings From N.Y.: Holly Lerski & Angelou 1997 – 2004 (2004)
- Life Is Beautiful (2003)
- Sweet Dreams Tonight (Best of Angelou) (2001)
- Midnight Witcheries (2001)
- While You Were Sleeping (2000)
- Automiracles (1998)

=== Singles and EPs ===
- Girl In A High Castle LA (2024)
- Sweet Decline (2024)
- Oh Cassy Run (2024)
- Tall Trees (2024)
- Chicago (2024)
- Carmel / Mighty Big Sur (2021)
- Home Is Your Shoulder (2020)
- Oh Atoms, Oh Molecules (2015)
- My Love (2003)
- Everyone's Lonely (2003)
- Summertime (2001)
- Hallelujah (1997)

=== Official Videos ===
- Tall Trees (2024)
- Chicago (2024)
- Mighty Big Sur (2021)
- Carmel (2021)
- Home Is Your Shoulder (2020)
- Oh Atoms, Oh Molecules (2015)
- Come Sit Down (2015)
- My Love (2003)
- Everyone's Lonely (2003)
- Summer Homecoming (2001)
- This Is Not A Love Song (2001)
