= Justin Edrich =

English cricketer (born 1961)

Justin Wells Edrich (born 17 January 1961) is a former English cricketer who played in five List A matches for Suffolk County Cricket Club. He is the son of Bill Edrich and was a right-handed batsman who captained his school cricket team at Wymondham College in 1978, and then he went on to represent Suffolk (1981–1992), Middlesex 2nd XI (1980–1988), Norfolk & Suffolk (1984) and Past Suffolk (2004).

== Family ==
Justin Edrich has a daughter named Alix and a son named Tom (who has captained Southgate Cricket Club in the Middlesex Premier League) .
