= Lingwood =

Village in Norfolk, England

Coordinates: 52.62°N 1.49°E

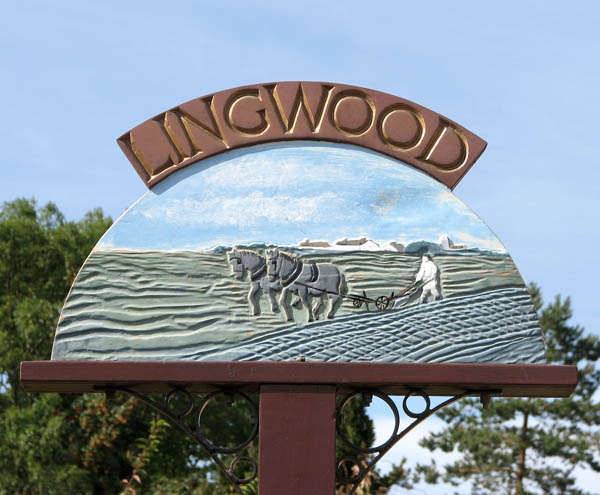
- Lingwood Village Sign

- Location within Norfolk
- Area: 1.08 km^{2} (0.42 sq mi)
- Population: 2,719 (2011 census)
  - Density: 2,518/km^{2} (6,520/sq mi)
- OS grid reference: TG3608
- Civil parish: Lingwood and Burlingham
- District: Broadland
- Shire county: Norfolk
- Region: East
- Country: England
- Sovereign state: United Kingdom
- Post town: NORWICH
- Postcode district: NR13
- Dialling code: 01603
- Police: Norfolk
- Fire: Norfolk
- Ambulance: East of England
- UK Parliament: Broadland and Fakenham

Lingwood is a village and former civil parish, now in the parish of Lingwood and Burlingham, in the Broadland district, in the English county of Norfolk. In 2011 the built-up area had a population of 2,719 and the built-up area sub division had a population of 2,493.

Lingwood is located 2.3 miles (3.7 km) south-west of Acle and 8 miles (13 km) east of Norwich.

== History ==
Lingwood's name is of Anglo-Saxon origin and derives from the Old English for bank wood.

Lingwood is not listed in the Domesday Book.

In 1931 the parish had a population of 568. On 1 April 1935 the parish was abolished and merged with Burlingham.

Lingwood Railway Station opened in 1882 on the Great Eastern Railway and remains open as a stop on the Wherry Line for services between Norwich and Great Yarmouth.

During a heatwave on 26 June 2026, a temperature of 38.0 °C (100.4 °F) was recorded at a Met Office station in Lingwood, breaking the all-time United Kingdom temperature record for the month of June. This comprehensively beat the previous record of 35.6 °C (96.1 °F), set in the 1976 heatwave.

== St. Peter's Church ==
Lingwood's former parish church is dedicated to Saint Peter and dates from the Fourteenth Century. St. Peter's is located on Church Road and has been Grade I listed since 1962. The church is open for Sunday service three times a month.

St. Peter's holds a set of royal arms from the reign of King George IV as well as a medieval wall painting of Saint Christopher which was uncovered in 1965.

== Governance ==
Lingwood is part of the electoral ward of Burlingham for local elections and is part of the district of Broadland.

The village's national constituency is Broadland and Fakenham which has been represented by the Conservative Party's Jerome Mayhew MP since 2019.
