= List of Berkshire County Cricket Club List A players =

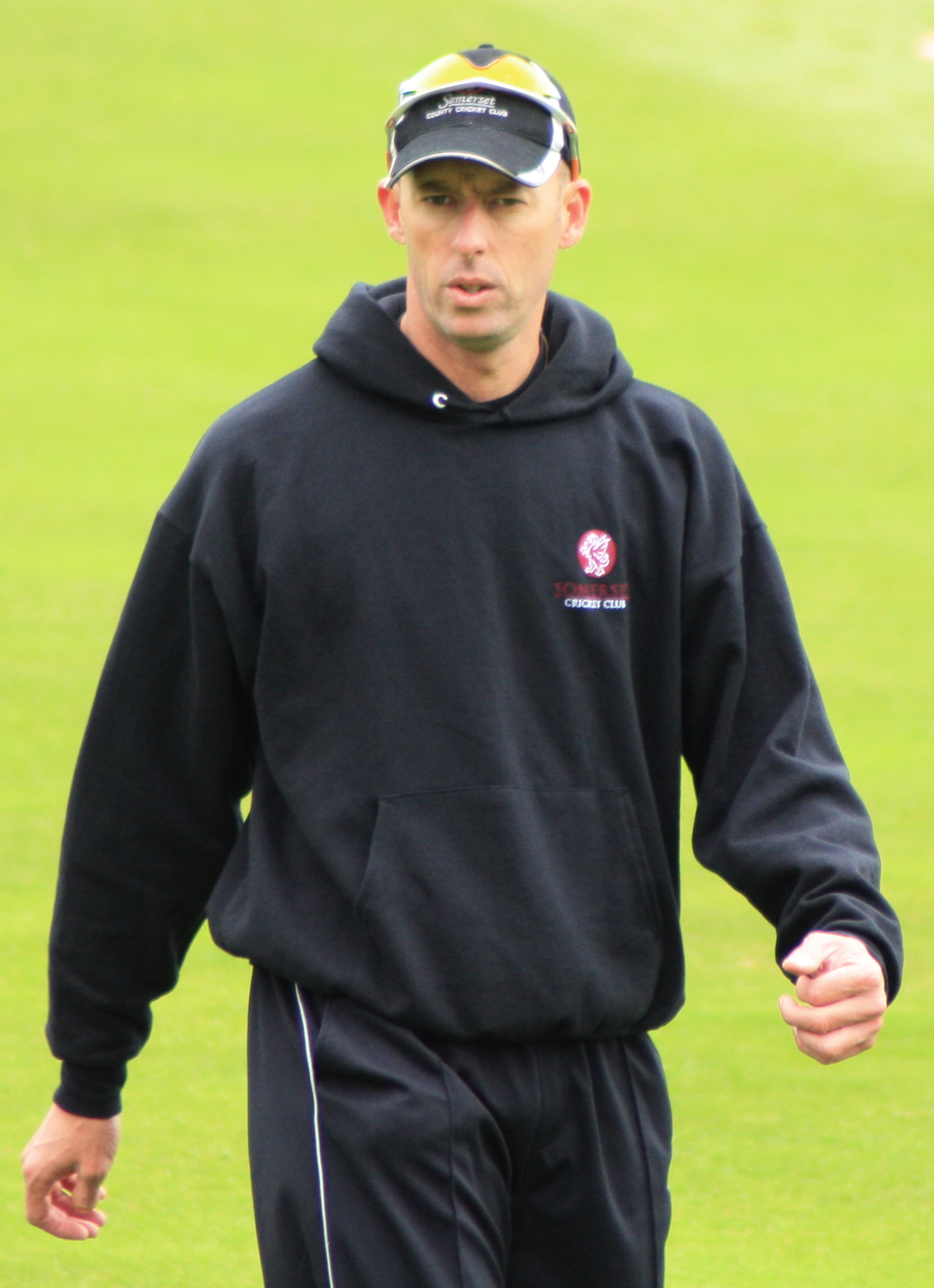
Charl Willoughby played two matches for Berkshire in 2000, taking 2 wickets

Berkshire County Cricket Club was formed in 1895, and first competed in the Minor Counties Championship in 1896. They have appeared in thirty List A matches, making five Gillette Cup, seventeen NatWest Trophy and eight Cheltenham & Gloucester Trophy appearances. The players in this list have all played at least one List A match. Berkshire cricketers who have not represented the county in List A cricket are excluded from the list.

Players are listed in order of appearance, where players made their debut in the same match, they are ordered by batting order. Players in bold have played first-class cricket.

== Key ==
**General**

- ♠ – Captain
- † – Wicket-keeper
- **First** – Year of debut for Berkshire
- **Last** – Year of latest match played for Berkshire
- **Mat** – Number of matches played for Berkshire
- **Win%** – Winning percentage

**Batting**

- **Inn** – Number of innings batted
- **NO** – Number of innings not out
- **Runs** – Runs scored in career
- **HS** – Highest score
- **100** – Centuries scored
- **50** – Half-centuries scored
- **Avg** – Runs scored per dismissal
- * – Batsman remained not out

**Bowling**

- **Balls** – Balls bowled in career
- **Wkt** – Wickets taken in career
- **BBI** – Best bowling in an innings
- **BBM** – Best bowling in a match
- **Ave** – Average runs per wicket

**Fielding**

- **Ca** – Catches taken
- **St** – Stumpings effected

== List of players ==
No.	Name	Nationality	First	Last	Mat	Batting			Bowling				Fielding	
No.	Name	Nationality	First	Last	Mat	Runs	HS	Avg	Balls	Wkt	BBI	Ave	Ca	St
1	Brian Cheesman	England	1965	1966	3	60	31	20.00	96	1	1/37	71.00	1	0
2	**Anthony Davis** ♠	England	1965	1966	3	68	47	22.66	0	0	–	–	0	0
3	John Drewett †	England	1965	1965	1	1	1	1.00	0	0	–	–	0	0
4	**David Mordaunt**	England	1965	1976	4	144	60	36.00	219	3	3/24	44.00	2	0
5	Joe Mence	England	1965	1965	1	22	22	22.00	0	0	–	–	0	0
6	**Francis Neate**	England	1965	1979	4	57	38	14.25		0	–	–	3	0
7	**Alan Revill**	England	1965	1965	1	0	0	0.00	12	1	1/6	6.00	0	0
8	Charles Brooks	England	1965	1966	3	43	37*	21.50	12	0	0	–	2	0
9	John Flower	England	1965	1965	1	1	1	1.00	0	0	–	–	0	0
10	Anthony Denness	England	1965	1966	3	35	18	17.50	216	7	4/56	15.28	1	0
11	Frederick Baines	England	1965	1966	3	8	4*	–	221	2	2/43	58.00	1	0
12	**Richard Fortin** †	England	1966	1966	2	19	18	9.50	0	0	–	–	1	0
13	Peter Baker	England	1966	1966	2	14	9	17.00	0	0	–	–	0	0
14	Peter Watts	England	1966	1966	2	9	5	4.50	66	2	1/17	41.00	0	0
15	**Peter Simpkins**	England	1966	1966	2	0	0	–	144	3	2/54	29.00	0	0
16	David Johnston	England	1976	1979	2	105	68	52.50	0	0	–	–	1	0
17	**Eric Russell**	England	1976	1976	1	4	4	4.00	0	0	–	–	0	0
18	Colin Casemore	Wales	1976	1976	1	6	6	6.00	0	0	–	–	0	0
19	Danny Hall	England	1976	1976	1	0	0	0.00	0	0	–	–	0	0
20	**Michael Mence** ♠	England	1976	1979	2	46	44	23.00	144	0	–	–	0	0
21	Richard van der Knaap	South Africa	1976	1976	1	12	12*	–	61	1	1/20	20.00	0	0
22	Gordon Child ♠†	Wales	1976	1985	5	33	12*	8.25	0	0	–	–	6	1
23	Alexander Mahoney	New Zealand	1976	1976	1	0	0	0.00	72	4	4/32	8.00	0	0
24	William Burgoyne	England	1976	1976	1	0	0*	0.00	66	0	–	–	2	0
25	Jefferson Jones	England	1976	1992	11	20	12*	6.66	678	15	4/35	35.60	1	0
26	**John Harvey** ♠	England	1979	1986	5	17	8	3.40	0	0	–	–	3	0
27	**Richard Davies**	England	1979	1979	1	7	7	7.00	12	0	–	–	1	0
28	Mark Simmons ♠	England	1979	1995	12	154	34	15.40	60	2	2/43	21.50	2	0
29	Nevada Phillips	England	1979	1979	1	21	21	21.00	0	0	–	–	0	0
30	Roger Cruttenden	England	1979	1979	1	26	26*	–	72	1	1/52	52.00	0	0
31	**Peter Lewington**	England	1979	1991	6	12	9*	12.00	342	5	3/23	34.40	0	0
32	**Andy Dindar**	England	1983	1983	1	0	0	0.00	6	0	–	–	0	0
33	Martin Lickley	England	1983	1992	9	165	44	18.33	54	1	1/15	41.00	1	0
34	**John Claughton**	England	1983	1985	3	29	19	9.66	0	0	–	–	0	0
35	**Graham Roope**	England	1983	1988	5	128	40	25.60	216	2	1/32	77.00	1	0
36	Stephen Burrow	England	1983	1983	1	14	14	14.00	72	0	–	–	1	0
37	Paul New	England	1983	1986	4	25	13	6.25	280	6	3/58	25.33	1	0
38	David Gorman	England	1984	1988	4	44	28	11.00	0	0	–	–	0	0
39	Eddison Roberts	England	1984	1985	2	10	7	5.00	138	2	2/42	56.00	0	0
40	Lloyd Sluman	England	1985	1985	1	12	12*	–	72	1	1/53	53.00	0	0
41	Kevin Murray	England	1986	1992	2	1	1	0.50	0	0	–	–	0	0
42	Barry Jackson	England	1986	1994	4	29	14	9.66	276	5	3/38	34.40	2	0
43	Mark Stevens †	England	1986	1991	5	34	23	17.00	0	0	–	–	2	1
44	Gary Loveday ♠	England	1988	2000	13	249	56	19.15	0	0	–	–	3	0
45	Mark Stear	England	1988	1992	5	46	23	46.00	252	2	1/39	77.50	0	0
46	David Hartley	England	1988	1997	7	8	8	2.66	368	4	2/35	75.25	0	0
47	Timothy Dodd	England	1988	1989	2	19	15	19.00	90	2	2/37	23.00	0	0
48	**Phillip Heseltine**	England	1989	1989	1	30	30	30.00	0	0	–	–	1	0
49	David Mercer	England	1989	1994	4	70	45	17.50	0	0	–	–	3	0
50	Gary Headley	England	1990	1994	3	35	13	11.66	168	1	1/35	124.00	0	0
51	David Shaw	England	1990	1995	4	103	57	34.33	26	0	–	–	0	0
52	Philip Oxley	England	1990	1996	6	111	49	37.00	246	7	5/87	37.42	0	0
53	Neil Cartmel †	England	1992	1994	2	27	27	27.00	0	0	–	–	2	0
54	**Neil Fusedale**	England	1992	1993	4	33	33*	16.50	264	3	2/19	66.00	3	0
55	**Julian Wood** ♠	England	1994	2005	13	339	88	28.25	89	4	2/14	16.50	2	0
56	James Barrow	England	1994	2001	9	21	16	7.00	492	11	4/31	31.18	1	0
57	**Aftab Habib**	England	1995	1995	1	3	3	3.00	0	0	–	–	0	0
58	**Simon Myles**	England	1995	2002	6	143	81	35.75	264	10	4/8	19.20	1	0
59	Robert Horner †	England	1995	1995	1	1	1	1.00	0	0	–	–	0	0
60	Robert Pitcher	England	1995	1995	1	16	16*	–	38	0	–	–	0	0
61	**Daren Foster**	England	1995	1995	1	21	21	21.00	24	0	–	–	0	0
62	Rukshan Soza	Sri Lanka	1996	1996	1	10	10	10.00	0	0	–	–	0	0
63	Thomas Hall	England	1996	2002	2	8	8	4.00	0	0	–	–	1	0
64	Harry Hall	England	1996	2000	6	189	108	31.50	42	0	–	–	2	0
65	**Alex Barnett**	England	1996	1996	1	22	22	22.00	72	0	–	–	0	0
66	Mark Lane †	England	1996	2001	8	74	24*	37.00	0	0	–	–	10	3
67	Jonathan Govett	England	1996	1996	1	0	0	–	72	3	3/103	34.33	0	0
68	Jamie Sylvester ♠	Wales	1997	1997	1	22	22	22.00	54	2	2/59	29.50	0	0
69	Stewart Seymour	England	1997	2001	6	90	30	18.00	0	0	–	–	2	0
70	James Hodgson	England	1997	1997	1	53	53*	–	0	0	–	–	1	0
71	**Neil Kendrick**	England	1997	1997	1	0	0	–	72	1	1/46	46.00	0	0
72	**Kervin Marc**	England	1997	1997	1	0	0	–	54	1	1/61	61.00	0	0
73	Tom Fray	England	1999	2005	6	128	87*	25.60	0	0	–	–	4	0
74	Billy Stelling	Netherlands	1999	1999	2	79	76*	–	102	3	3/18	14.00	0	0
75	Sameer Patel	England	1999	2005	11	104	53*	14.85	345	7	2/28	36.71	7	0
76	Peter Lamsdale	England	1999	1999	2	10	10	10.00	90	2	1/35	43.00	0	0
77	Michael O'Sullivan	England	1999	2001	2	20	20	20.00	96	1	1/12	48.00	3	0
78	**Toby Radford**	Wales	1999	1999	1	4	4	4.00	0	0	–	–	0	0
79	Gareth Edwards	England	1999	1999	1	5	5	5.00	36	0	–	–	0	0
80	Lee Nurse	England	2000	2003	7	182	81	26.00	0	0	–	–	3	0
81	**John Emburey**	England	2000	2000	1	2	2	2.00	116	6	4/15	9.66	0	0
82	**Charl Willoughby**	South Africa	2000	2000	2	0	0	0.00	120	2	2/27	27.00	1	0
83	**Jonathan Moss**	Australia	2001	2001	2	28	28	14.00	120	5	3/52	17.60	0	0
84	Tom Lambert	England	2001	2005	7	24	18*	12.00	336	9	2/19	23.00	1	0
85	**Christopher Batt**	England	2001	2001	2	7	7	7.00	102	4	2/31	17.00	0	0
86	**Richard Davis**	England	2001	2001	3	57	56	25.80	162	4	2/27	24.75	2	0
87	Nick Harvey †	England	2001	2001	1	7	7	7.00	0	0	–	–	2	1
88	Neil Gunter	England	2001	2005	2	6	5	3.00	66	1	1/51	76.00	0	0
89	Jonathan Perkins	England	2001	2005	4	36	22	9.00	0	0	–	–	2	0
90	Steve Wyatt	England	2001	2001	1	8	8	8.00	0	0	–	–	0	0
91	Nicholas Denning	England	2001	2005	5	3	2	3.00	237	7	3/22	26.00	2	0
92	**Paul Prichard**	England	2002	2005	5	119	51*	39.66	0	0	–	–	0	0
93	**Nicholas Wilton** †	England	2002	2002	2	5	5	5.00	0	0	–	–	0	0
94	**Tyron Henderson**	South Africa	2002	2003	2	15	12	7.50	84	3	3/30	17.66	0	0
95	Steven Naylor	England	2002	2005	4	42	23	21.00	174	4	3/28	26.00	1	0
96	**James Morris**	England	2002	2003	2	17	17	17.00	24	0	–	–	0	0
97	**Richard Howitt**	England	2003	2004	2	9	7	4.50	0	0	–	–	0	0
98	**Jimmy Adams**	Jamaica	2003	2003	1	8	8	8.00	36	0	–	–	0	0
99	James Theunissen	England	2003	2003	1	16	16	16.00	30	1	1/41	41.00	0	0
100	Bjorn Mordt †	Zimbabwe	2004	2005	1	44	43	22.00	0	0	–	–	0	0
101	**David Taylor**	England	2004	2004	1	2	2	2.00	12	0	–	–	0	0
102	**Carl Crowe**	England	2004	2005	2	3	2	1.50	60	1	1/47	47.00	2	0
103	James Kingstone †	England	2004	2004	1	17	17*	–	0	0	–	–	0	0
104	Stephen Bloyce	England	2004	2005	1	0	0	0.00	36	1	1/66	66.00	0	0

== List A captains ==
No.	Name	First	Last	Mat	Won	Lost	Tied	Win%
1	Anthony Davis	1965	1966	3	1	2	0	33.33%
2	Michael Mence	1976	1976	1	0	1	0	0%
3	Gordon Child	1979	1979	1	0	1	0	0%
4	John Harvey	1983	1986	4	0	4	0	0%
5	Mark Simmons	1988	1995	7	0	7	0	0%
6	Gary Loveday	1996	2000	5	2	3	0	40%
7	Jamie Sylvester	1997	1997	1	0	1	0	0%
8	Julian Wood	2001	2005	8	3	5	0	37.50%
**Total**		1965	2005	**30**	**6**	**24**	**0**	**20.00%**
