= Peter Baker =

Peter Baker may refer to:

== Politics ==
- Peter William Baker (1756–1815), English politician
- Peter Baker (Canadian politician) (1887–1973), Lebanese-born Canadian trader, politician, and author
- Peter Baker (British politician) (1921–1966), British Conservative MP

== Sports ==
- Peter Baker (footballer, born 1931) (1931–2016), English footballer who played for Tottenham Hotspur in the 1950s and 1960s
- Peter Baker (footballer, born 1934) (1934–2021), English footballer who played for Sheffield Wednesday in the 1950s and Queens Park Rangers in the 1960s
- Peter Baker (Australian footballer) (born 1940), Australian rules footballer
- Peter Baker (cricketer) (1945–2000), English cricketer
- Peter Baker (golfer) (born 1967), British golfer

== Others ==
- Peter Baker (slave trader) (1731–1796), English slave trader
- Peter E. Baker (geologist) (1937–2008), British geologist
- Ginger Baker (Peter Edward Baker, 1939–2019), English drummer
- Peter Baker (journalist) (born 1967), American political journalist and author
- Peter S. Baker, designer of the typeface Junicode
- Peter Baker (Home and Away), character from Australian soap opera Home and Away
