= Hardstaff =

Hardstaff is an English surname. Notable people with the surname include:

- Gerry Hardstaff (1940–2015), English cricketer
- Joe Hardstaff (disambiguation), multiple people
- Richard Hardstaff (1863–1932), English cricketer
- Veronica Hardstaff (born 1941), British politician
