= Mence =

Mence is both a given name and surname. Notable people with the name include:

- Joe Mence (1921–2014), English cricket player
- Mence Dros-Canters (1900–1934), Dutch hockey, badminton, and tennis player
- Michael Mence (1944–2014), English cricket player

== See also ==
- Bence
