= Richard Fortin (cricketer) =

English cricketer

Personal information
- Full name: Richard Chalmers Gordon Fortin
- Born: 12 April 1941 (age 85); Singapore
- Height: 5 ft 6 in (1.68 m)
- Batting: Right-handed
- Role: Wicketkeeper
- Relatives: Derek Bridge (uncle)

Domestic team information
- Years: Team
- 1965-1970: Berkshire
- 1963: Oxford University

Career statistics
Competition	FC	LA
Matches	2	2
Runs scored	52	19
Batting average	13.00	9.50
100s/50s	–/–	–/–
Top score	25	18
Balls bowled	–	–
Wickets	–	–
Bowling average	–	–
5 wickets in innings	–	–
10 wickets in match	–	–
Best bowling	–	–
Catches/stumpings	–/–	1/–
- Source: Cricinfo, 22 September 2010

Richard Chalmers Gordon Fortin (born 12 April 1941) is an English former cricketer. Fortin was a right-handed batsman who played primarily as a wicketkeeper. He was born in Singapore.

Fortin played 2 first-class matches for Oxford University in 1963 against Worcestershire and Lancashire. In his 2 first-class matches he scored 52 runs at a batting average of 13.00, with a high score of 25.

Fortin made his Minor Counties Championship debut for Berkshire in 1965 against Buckinghamshire. From 1965 to 1970, he represented the county in 19 Minor Counties Championship matches, the last of which came in the 1970 Championship when Berkshire played Buckinghamshire.

Additionally, he also played 2 List-A matches for Berkshire. His List-A debut for the county came against Hertfordshire in the 1st round of the 1966 Gillette Cup. His second and final List-A match came in the 2nd round of the same competition when Berkshire played Gloucestershire at Church Road Cricket Ground, Reading. In his 2 matches, he scored 19 runs at a batting average of 9.50, with a high score of 18. Behind the stumps he took a single catch.

== Family ==
His uncle Derek Bridge played first-class cricket for Oxford University and Northamptonshire and Minor counties cricket for Dorset, as well as rugby union for a number of teams.
