= Van der Knaap =

Van der Knaap is a surname. Notable people with the surname include:

- Astrid van der Knaap (born 1964), Dutch badminton player
- Cees van der Knaap (born 1951), Dutch politician
- David van der Knaap (born 1948), South African cricketer
- Marjo van der Knaap (born 1958), Dutch neurologist
- Richard van der Knaap (born 1947), South African cricketer
