= Cartmell =

Cartmell is a surname. Notable people with the surname include:

- Fraser Cartmell (born 1982), Scottish triathlete
- Harry Cartmell (1857–1923), British politician and lawyer
- Jack Cartmell (1890–1979), English footballer
- James Cartmell (academic) (1810–1887), Master of Christ's College, Cambridge
- James Cartmell (actor), English actor
- Martha Cartmell, Canadian Methodist/United Church missionary and educator
- Nathaniel Cartmell (1883–1967), American athlete
- Nicholas Cartmell, Canadian politician
- Sarah Cartmell, British bioengineer
- Selina Cartmell, British theatre director
- Tim Cartmell, American martial artist

== See also ==
- Cartmel (disambiguation)
