= Mark Simmons =

Mark Simmons may refer to:

- Mark Simmons (American football) (born 1984), American football wide receiver
- Mark Simmons (comedian) (born 1984 or 1985), British comedian
- Mark Simmons (cricketer) (born 1955), former English cricketer
- Mark Simmons (boxer) (born 1974), Canadian heavyweight boxer
- Mark Simmons (police officer), British senior police officer
- Mark Simmons (politician), former Oregon house of representatives member
- Mark Simmons (discus thrower) (born 1978), American discus thrower, All-American for the SMU Mustangs track and field team

== See also ==
- Marc Simmons, American historian
- Marcus Simmons (disambiguation)
