= 1966 Gillette Cup =

- Administrator: Marylebone Cricket Club
- Cricket format: Limited overs cricket (60 overs per innings)
- Tournament format: Knockout
- Champions: Warwickshire (1st title)
- Participants: 22
- Matches: 21
- Most runs: 299 – Dennis Amiss (Warwickshire)
- Most wickets: 10 – Bill Alley (Somerset); 10 – David Brown (Warwickshire); 10 – Roy Palmer (Somerset)

The 1966 Gillette Cup was the fourth Gillette Cup, an English limited overs county cricket tournament. It was held between 28 April and 3 September 1966. The tournament was won by Warwickshire County Cricket Club in the final at Lord's.

== Format ==
The 17 first-class counties, were joined by five Minor Counties: Berkshire, Cheshire, Hertfordshire, Lincolnshire and Suffolk. Teams who won in the first round progressed to the second round. The winners in the second round then progressed to the quarter-final stage. Winners from the quarter-finals then progressed to the semi-finals from which the winners then went on to the final at Lord's which was held on 3 September 1966.

== First round ==
28 April 1966
Scorecard

Lancashire; 104/9 (60 overs)	v	Cheshire; 62 (45.3 overs)
Robert Entwistle 43*; Gerry Hardstaff 4/31 (12 overs)		Frederick Millett 24; Ken Higgs 4/10 (10.3 overs)

Lancashire won by 42 runs
Macclesfield Cricket Club Ground, Macclesfield
Umpires: Freddie Jakeman and Dusty Rhodes
Player of the match: Robert Entwistle (Lancs)

30 April 1966
Scorecard

Hertfordshire; 167 (58.3 overs)	v	Berkshire; 171/8 (46.2 overs)
Alan Bell 105; David Mordaunt 3/24 (11.3 overs)		David Mordaunt 53; John Iberson 3/37 (11 overs)

Berkshire won by 2 wickets
Hitchin Town Cricket Club Ground, Hitchin
Umpires: Laurie Gray and Lofty Herman
Player of the match: Alan Bell (Herts)

30 April 1966
Scorecard

Northamptonshire; 67 (37 overs)	v	Glamorgan; 70/1 (24 overs)
Brian Reynolds 23; Jeff Jones 4/12 (11 overs)		Alan Jones 37*; Brian Crump 1/5 (7 overs)

Glamorgan won by 9 wickets
County Ground, Northampton
Umpires: Ron Aspinall and Hugo Yarnold
Player of the match: Jeff Jones (Glam)

30 April 1966
Scorecard

Sussex; 175/8 (60 overs)	v	Somerset; 179/6 (54.3 overs)
Nawab of Pataudi 42; Bill Alley 4/14 (12 overs)		Mervyn Kitchen 41; Tony Buss 3/28 (11 overs)

Somerset won by 4 wickets
County Ground, Taunton
Umpires: Jack Crapp and Eddie Phillipson
Player of the match: Bill Alley (Somst)

30 April 1966
Scorecard

Kent; 284/5 (60 overs)	v	Suffolk; 171/8 (60 overs)
Colin Cowdrey 116; John Hargreaves 2/44 (11 overs)		Robert Flack 46; David Sayer 3/24 (11 overs)

Kent won by 113 runs
Ipswich School Ground, Ipswich
Umpires: Ron Lay and Fred Price
Player of the match: Colin Cowdrey (Kent)

4, 5 May 1966
Scorecard

Hampshire; 226/9 (60 overs)	v	Lincolnshire; 195 (56.4 overs)
Danny Livingstone 92; George Camplin 3/38 (12 overs)		Ivan Madray 58; Butch White 4/36 (10 overs)

Hampshire won by 31 runs
County Ground, Southampton
Umpires: Arthur Fagg and John Langridge
Player of the match: Danny Livingstone (Hants)

- Reserve day used

== Second round ==
21 May 1966
Scorecard

Gloucestershire; 327/7 (60 overs)	v	Berkshire; 192/8 (60 overs)
Ron Nicholls 127; Tony Denness 4/56 (11 overs)		Anthony Davis 47; John Mortimore 2/36 (10 overs)

Gloucestershire won by 135 runs
Church Road, Reading
Umpires: Peter Wight and Hugo Yarnold
Player of the match: Ron Nicholls (Glos)

21 May 1966
Scorecard

Derbyshire; 199 (59.5 overs)	v	Essex; 200/8 (57.4 overs)
Derek Morgan 42; Brian Edmeades 3/32 (12 overs)		Michael Bear 71; Alan Ward 3/36 (12 overs)

Essex won by 2 wickets
Queen's Park, Chesterfield
Umpires: Freddie Jakeman and Eddie Phillipson
Player of the match: Michael Bear (Essex)

21 May 1966
Scorecard

Warwickshire; 266/8 (60 overs)	v	Glamorgan; 101 (34.3 overs)
Dennis Amiss 113; Jeff Jones 3/51 (12 overs)		Bernard Hedges 32; David Brown 5/18 (7.3 overs)

Warwickshire won by 165 runs
St Helen's, Swansea
Umpires: John Arnold and Bill Copson
Player of the match: David Brown (Warks)

21 May 1966
Scorecard

Hampshire; 199 (59.5 overs)	v	Kent; 145 (49.4 overs)
Colin Ingleby-Mackenzie 59*; David Sayer 3/38 (11.5 overs)		Brian Luckhurst 65; Derek Shackleton 3/12 (10 overs)

Hampshire won by 54 runs
County Ground, Southampton
Umpires: Jack Crapp and George Pope
Player of the match: Colin Ingleby-Mackenzie (Hants)

21 May 1966
Scorecard

Surrey; 231/8 (60 overs)	v	Leicestershire; 185/9 (60 overs)
John Edrich 77; Graham Cross 3/36 (11 overs)		Graham Cross 53*; Geoff Arnold 4/28 (12 overs)

Surrey won by 46 runs
Grace Road, Leicester
Umpires: Charlie Elliott and Arthur Jepson
Player of the match: Ken Barrington (Surrey)

21 May 1966
Scorecard

Lancashire; 243/9 (60 overs)	v	Middlesex; 180 (51 overs)
David Green 81; Bob Herman 3/63 (11 overs)		John Murray 54; Brian Statham 3/28 (12 overs)

Lancashire won by 63 runs
Lord's, London
Umpires: Paul Gibb and Tom Spencer
Player of the match: David Green (Lancs)

21 May 1966
Scorecard

Somerset; 190/7 (60 overs)	v	Yorkshire; 150 (50.1 overs)
Bill Alley 58*; Don Wilson 2/38 (9 overs)		Richard Illingworth 29*; Roy Palmer 4/33 (12 overs)

Somerset won by 40 runs
County Ground, Taunton
Umpires: Lofty Herman and Dusty Rhodes
Player of the match: Roy Palmer (Somst)

21 May 1966
Scorecard

Worcestershire; 179 (57.4 overs)	v	Nottinghamshire; 160 (56 overs)
Ron Headley 64; Alec Johnson 4/37 (11 overs)		Bob White 39; Norman Gifford 3/28 (12 overs)

Worcestershire won by 19 runs
New Road, Worcester
Umpires: Ron Aspinall and Cec Pepper
Player of the match: Ron Headley (Worcs)

== Quarter-finals ==
22 June 1966
Scorecard

Surrey; 173 (57.1 overs)	v	Hampshire; 174/3 (43 overs)
Ken Barrington 46; Jimmy Gray 3/28 (12 overs)		Roy Marshall 85; Pat Pocock 1/18 (10 overs)

Hampshire won by 7 wickets
Dean Park Cricket Ground, Bournemouth
Umpires: Albert Alderman and Laurie Gray
Player of the match: Roy Marshall (Hants)

22 June 1966
Scorecard

Lancashire; 103 (49.5 overs)	v	Somerset; 104/6 (50.1 overs)
Jack Bond 29; Roy Palmer 5/18 (12 overs)		Mervyn Kitchen 32; Brian Statham 2/10 (10.1 overs)

Somerset won by 4 wickets
County Ground, Taunton
Umpires: Paul Gibb and John Langridge
Player of the match: Roy Palmer (Somst)

22 June 1966
Scorecard

Gloucestershire; 193 (57.1 overs)	v	Warwickshire; 197/4 (38.2 overs)
Sid Russell 47; David Brown 3/33 (12 overs)		Bob Barber 113; Jim Andrew 2/41 (9 overs)

Warwickshire won by 6 wickets
Edgbaston, Birmingham
Umpires: John Arnold and Harry Mellows
Player of the match: Bob Barber (Warks)

22 June 1966
Scorecard

Worcestershire; 211 (60 overs)	v	Essex; 129 (47.1 overs)
Martin Horton 51; Tony Jorden 3/46 (12 overs)		Barry Knight 52; Len Coldwell 4/42 (12 overs)

Worcestershire won by 82 runs
New Road, Worcester
Umpires: Dusty Rhodes and William Simpson
Player of the match: Martin Horton (Worcs)

== Semi-finals ==
10 August 1966
Scorecard

Somerset; 189 (59.4 overs)	v	Warwickshire; 190/5 (51.4 overs)
Graham Atkinson 72; Jack Bannister 3/47 (11.4 overs)		Dennis Amiss 80*; Bill Alley 2/15 (12 overs)

Warwickshire won by 5 wickets
Edgbaston, Birmingham
Umpires: Syd Buller and Tom Spencer
Player of the match: Dennis Amiss (Warks)

10 August 1966
Scorecard

Worcestershire; 253/4 (60 overs)	v	Hampshire; 154 (48.2 overs)
Martin Horton 114; Bob Cottam 2/45 (12 overs)		Roy Marshall 37; Len Coldwell 4/39 (12 overs)

Worcestershire won by 99 runs
New Road, Worcester
Umpires: Bill Copson and Ron Lay
Player of the match: Martin Horton (Worcs)

== Final ==
3 September 1966
Scorecard

Worcestershire; 155/8 (60 overs)	v	Warwickshire; 159/5 (56.4 overs)
Norman Gifford 38; Tom Cartwright 3/16 (12 overs)		Bob Barber 66; Basil D'Oliveira 1/26 (10 overs)

Warwickshire won by 5 wickets
Lord's, London
Umpires: Syd Buller and Charlie Elliott
Player of the match: Bob Barber (Warks)
