= Drewitt =

Drewitt is a surname. Notable people with the surname include:

- Brett Drewitt (born 1990), Australian professional golfer
- Herbert Drewitt (1895–1927), New Zealand World War I flying ace

== See also ==
- DeWitt (name)
- Drewett, surname
- Druitt, surname
