= Alan Bell =

Alan Bell may refer to:

- Alan J. W. Bell (1937–2023), British television producer and director
- Alan Bell (cricketer) (1929–2011), English cricketer
- Alan E. Bell (1949–2016), American technologist
- Alan Bell (sprinter) (born 1957), British athlete
- Alan P. Bell (1932–2002), American psychologist
- Alan Edward Bell, American film editor
- Alan Bell (resident magistrate), Irish assassinated government official

== See also ==
- Allan Bell (born 1947), Manx politician
- Allan Bell (sociolinguist) (born 1947), researcher in New Zealand
- Allan Gordon Bell (born 1953), Canadian composer
- Allen Bell (1870–1936), New Zealand MP
- Allen Bell (cyclist) (1933–2026), American Olympic cyclist
- Al Bell (born 1940), American record producer
