= Eddison =

Eddison is a given name and a surname. Notable people with the name include:

- Alfred Eddison Hutton (1865–1947), British Liberal politician and manufacturer

Surname Eddison:

- E. R. Eddison (1882–1945), English author
- Nicole Eddison character in Robert Muchamore's CHERUB series of books
- Robert Eddison, OBE (1908–1991), British actor, played the Grail Knight in Indiana Jones and the Last Crusade
- Roger Eddison (1916–2000), Operations Researcher
- William Eddison Dawson (1829–1902), English-born businessman and political figure on Prince Edward Island

First name Eddison:

- Eddison Roberts (born 1959), Antiguan born former English cricketer
- Eddison Zvobgo or Edson Zvobgo (1935–2004), founder of Zimbabwe's ruling party Zanu-PF

== See also ==
- Edison (disambiguation)
- Edson (disambiguation)
