= Freei =

Internet service provider

Freei Networks, Inc.
- Type: Public
- Traded as: Nasdaq: FREI
- Industry: Online Internet service provider
- Founded: December 1998; 27 years ago
- Founder: Robert McCausland
- Defunct: October 2000
- Fate: Bankruptcy
- Headquarters: Federal Way, Washington United States
- Area served: United States
- Key people: Bob McCausland (CEO); Mark Stevens (director; Sequoia Capital); Naveen Jain (director); Ron Erickson (director)
- Services: Free Internet access
- Number of employees: 365
- Parent: United Online
- Subsidiaries: Freei Asia, led by Chris Beer (GM/ Asia Director), Ross Knudson (Singapore ), Alex Wong (Malaysia), Kobsak Chinawongwatana (Thailand), Kuok Khoon Ean (SCMP China).

Freei Networks, Inc. (also known as Freei.net, FreeInternet.com) was a free Internet service provider from 1998-2001. In 2000, FreeInternet.com was acquired by United Online, Inc. (owner of NetZero, Juno, Classmates.com and others). In 2008, United Online re-launched FreeInternet.com as a website dedicated to free and discounted retail offers.

== Services ==
Freei provided a free alternative ISP, allowing users to anonymously log on to the internet using the Freei software and dialer. It reached over 2 million registered users nationally by 1999, and 3.2 million by the summer of 2000. In lieu of a subscription fee, the software displayed ads on the user's computer.

== IPO filing ==
Freei filed for an IPO on March 31, 2000. It went public on the Nasdaq under ticker symbol FREI.

== Bankruptcy ==
On October 9, 2000, Freei filed for bankruptcy after laying off 30% of its workforce. One week later, on October 16, 2000, the rest of the workforce was laid off and the corporate headquarters in Federal Way, Washington was permanently closed. In early November 2000, Freei's remaining assets were sold at auction.
