= Denness =

Denness is a surname. Notable people with the surname include:

- Anthony Denness (1936–2008), English cricketer
- Archer Denness (1914–1997), Australian Army officer
- Mary Denness (1927–2017), British safety campaigner
- Mike Denness (1940–2013), Scottish cricketer
