= Peter Watts (cricketer, born 1947) =

English cricketer

Personal information
- Full name: Peter Willett Watts
- Born: 17 July 1947 (age 79); Penang, Malayan Union
- Bowling: Slow left-arm orthodox

Domestic team information
- Years: Team
- 1964-1978: Berkshire

Career statistics
Competition	LA
Matches	2
Runs scored	9
Batting average	4.50
100s/50s	–/–
Top score	5
Balls bowled	66
Wickets	2
Bowling average	41.00
5 wickets in innings	–
10 wickets in match	–
Best bowling	1/17
Catches/stumpings	–/–
- Source: Cricinfo, 24 September 2010

Peter Willett Watts (born 17 July 1947) is a former Malaysian born English cricketer. Watts batting style is unknown, although he was a slow left-arm orthodox bowler. He was born at Penang, in the then Malayan Union.

Watts made his Minor Counties Championship debut for Berkshire in 1964 against Wiltshire. From 1964 to 1978, he represented the county in 22 Minor Counties Championship matches, the last of which came in the 1978 Championship when Berkshire played Devon.

Additionally, he also played 2 List-A matches for Berkshire. His List-A debut for the county came against Hertfordshire in the 1st round of the 1966 Gillette Cup. His second and final List-A match came in the 2nd round of the same competition when Berkshire played Gloucestershire at Church Road Cricket Ground, Reading. In his 2 matches, he scored 9 runs at a batting average of 4.50, with a high score of 5. With the ball he took 2 wickets at a bowling average of 41.00, with best figures of 1/17.
