= Cartmel (disambiguation) =

Cartmel is a village in Cumbria, England.

Cartmel may also refer to:

- Cartmel College, a college of The University of Lancaster
- Cartmel Fell, a hill, hamlet and civil parish in Cumbria, England
- Cartmel Priory, a former monastery and current church in the village of Cartmel
- Cartmel Priory School, a secondary school in the village of Cartmel
- Cartmel Racecourse, a small racecourse in the village of Cartmel

== People with the surname ==
- Andrew Cartmel (21st century), British science-fiction writer and journalist
- Hilary Cartmel (born 1958), English sculptor
- Neil Cartmel (born 1968), English cricketer

== See also ==
- Cartmell
