= Charles Brooks (cricketer) =

English cricketer (1927–2002)

Personal information
- Full name: Charles Edward William Brooks
- Born: 17 February 1927; Epsom, Surrey, England
- Died: 18 May 2002 (aged 75); Abingdon, Oxfordshire, England
- Batting: Right-handed
- Bowling: Leg break

Domestic team information
- Years: Team
- 1951–1966: Berkshire

Career statistics
Competition	LA
Matches	3
Runs scored	43
Batting average	21.50
100s/50s	–/–
Top score	37*
Balls bowled	12
Wickets	–
Bowling average	–
5 wickets in innings	–
10 wickets in match	–
Best bowling	–
Catches/stumpings	2/–
- Source: Cricinfo, 20 September 2010

Charles Edward William Brooks (17 February 1927 – 18 May 2002) was an English cricketer. Brooks was a right-handed batsman who bowled leg break. He was born at Epsom, Surrey.

Brooks made his Minor Counties Championship debut for Berkshire in 1951 against Cornwall. From 1951 to 1966, he represented the county in 99 Minor Counties Championship matches, the last of which came in the 1966 Championship when Berkshire played Devon.

Additionally, he also played List-A matches for Berkshire. His List-A debut for the county came against Somerset in the 1965 Gillette Cup. From 1965 to 1966, he represented the county in 3 List-A matches, with his final List-A match coming in the 2nd round of the 1966 Gillette Cup when Berkshire played Gloucestershire at Church Road Cricket Ground in Reading. In his 3 matches, he scored 43 runs at a batting average of 21.50, with a high score of 37*.

Brooks died at Abingdon, Oxfordshire on 18 May 2002.
