= Mark Stevens =

Mark or Marc Stevens may refer to:

== Performers ==
- Mark Stevens (actor) (1916–1994), American star of TV series Martin Kane
- Marc Stevens (actor) (1943–1989), American pioneering erotic performer
- Mark Stevens, British keyboard player with Mankind since 1978
- Mark Stevens (singer), Australian songwriter and worship leader since 1985

== Sportsmen ==
- Mark Stevens (cricketer) (born 1959), English right-handed batsman and wicketkeeper
- Mark Stevens (gridiron football) (born 1962), American quarterback in NFL and CFL
- Mark Stevens (swimmer) (born 1975), English Olympian and medalist
- Mark Stevens (footballer) (born 1975), Australian rules player in AFL
- Marc Stevens, American mixed martial arts fighter in 2010's The Ultimate Fighter: Team GSP vs. Team Koscheck

== Writers ==
- Mark Stevens (art critic) (born 1951), American winner of 2005 Pulitzer Prize
- Mark Stevens (attorney), American criminal defense lawyer and writer since 1975
- Marc Stevens (cryptology) (born 1981), Dutch technological researcher, author of HashClash

== Others ==
- Mark Stevens (film editor), American collaborator since 1990s with Joel Schumacher
- Mark Stevens (venture capitalist) (born 1960), American billionaire technology investor

== See also ==
- Mark Stephens (technology journalist) (born 1953), American writer, pen name Robert X. Cringely
- Mark Stephens (solicitor) (born 1957), English media and human rights counsel, mediator and broadcaster
