= Marylebone Cricket Club in Bangladesh in 1980–81 =

The tour started immediately after Christmas and ended in mid-January. Michael Mence, a member of the 1976–77 MCC team, was the captain of the side, which included three former Test players, John Jameson, John Hampshire, and Richard Hutton.

== The MCC team ==
- Michael Mence (captain)
- Asif Din
- John Hampshire
- Richard Hutton
- John Jameson
- Richard Lewis
- Dermott Monteith
- Andrew Needham
- Mark Nicholas
- Steve Plumb
- Nick Stewart
- Stuart Surridge
- Hugh Wilson

Lt. Col. J. R. Stephenson was the manager.

== Matches ==
=== Match 1 ===
29–30 December 1980

MCC	v	Central Zone
136 (overs unknown); Mark Nicholas 39; Yousuf Rahman Babu 3/21		73 (overs unknown); Manjur Ahmed Manju 30; Hugh Wilson 4/22
89/4d (overs unknown); Steve Plumb 33; Dipu Chowdhury 2/21		120/9 (overs unknown); Ashraful Haque 21; Hugh Wilson 4/18

Match drawn
District Stadium, Mymensingh

- Unknown
- Central Zone narrowly avoided defeat as they were 9 wickets down at the close of play.

=== Match 2 ===
2–3 January 1981

MCC	v	BCCB Combined XI
79 (overs unknown); Unknown; Obaidul Haq Azam 7/18		187/4d (overs unknown); Mujibul Haq 45; Unknown
199/5 (overs unknown); Asif Din 46; Obaidul Haq Azam 2/46

Match drawn
Faridpur Stadium, Faridpur

- Unknown
- Obaidul Haq Azam's 7/18 was the best bowling performance by a Bangladeshi at the time. This match marked the debut of Gazi Ashraf Lipu.

=== Match 3 ===
5–7 January 1981

Bangladesh	v	MCC
281/6 (overs unknown); Raquibul Hasan 78*; Nick Stewart 3/48		DNB

Match drawn
District Stadium, Chittagong

- Unknown
- The match was abandoned early on the second day due to bad weather.

=== Match 4 ===
9–11 January 1981

Bangladesh	v	MCC
216/8 (overs unknown); Mujibul Haq 38; Dermott Monteith 7/64		255 (overs unknown); John Jameson 73; Anwarul Amin Azhar 6/58
132 (overs unknown); Mujibul Haq 30*; Andrew Needham 4/26		37/2 (overs unknown); Unknown; Unknown

Match drawn
Rajshahi Divisional Stadium, Rajshahi

- Unknown

=== Match 5 ===
13–15 January 1981

Bangladesh	v	MCC
143 (overs unknown); Raquibul Hasan 51; Unknown		290/6d (overs unknown); Mark Nicholas 148*; Unknown
198/6 (overs unknown); Raquibul Hasan 51; Unknown

Match drawn
National Stadium, Dhaka

- Unknown
- Mark Nicholas scored the first ever century by an MCC player against Bangladesh.

=== Match 6 (One-Day Match) ===
17 January 1981

Bangladesh	v	MCC
141/8 (40 overs); Rafiqul Alam 27; Unknown		142/4 (overs unknown); Richard Lewis 38*; Unknown

MCC won by 6 wickets
National Stadium, Dhaka

- Unknown
- This was the only match of the tour to produce a definitive result.
