= Peter Simpkins =

English cricketer

Personal information
- Full name: Peter Anthony Simpkins
- Born: 27 November 1928; Dover, Kent, England
- Died: 4 January 2011 (aged 82); Torquay, England
- Batting: Right-handed
- Bowling: Slow left-arm orthodox

Domestic team information
- Years: Team
- 1962: Free Foresters
- 1958–1976: Berkshire

Career statistics
Competition	FC	LA
Matches	1	2
Runs scored	–	–
Batting average	–	–
100s/50s	–/–	–/–
Top score	–	–
Balls bowled	246	144
Wickets	3	3
Bowling average	38.00	29.00
5 wickets in innings	–	–
10 wickets in match	–	–
Best bowling	3/69	2/54
Catches/stumpings	2/–	–/–
- Source: Cricinfo, 20 September 2010

Peter Anthony Simpkins (27 November 1928 – 4 January 2011) was an English cricketer. He was a right-handed batsman who bowled slow left-arm orthodox. He was born in Dover, Kent.

Simpkins made his Minor Counties Championship debut for Berkshire in 1958 against Dorset. From 1958 to 1976, he represented the county in 121 Minor Counties Championship matches, the last of which came in the 1976 Championship when Berkshire played Oxfordshire.

He also played two List-A matches for Berkshire. His first for the county was against Hertfordshire in the 1966 Gillette Cup. His second and final List-A match came in the second round of the same tournament when Berkshire played Gloucestershire at the Church Road Cricket Ground in Reading. In his two matches, he took three wickets at a bowling average of 29.00, with best figures of 2/54.

Simpkins also played a single first-class match during his career, for the Free Foresters when they played Oxford University in 1962. He took three wickets at an average of 38.00, with best figures of 3/69.
