= Anthony Davis (cricketer) =

English cricketer (1931–1978)

Personal information
- Full name: Anthony Tilton Davis
- Born: 14 August 1931; Reading, Berkshire, England
- Died: 20 November 1978 (aged 47); Reading, Berkshire, England
- Batting: Right-handed
- Bowling: Slow left-arm orthodox

Domestic team information
- Years: Team
- 1967: Minor Counties
- 1967: Marylebone Cricket Club
- 1950-1974: Berkshire

Career statistics
| Competition | FC | LA |
|---|---|---|
| Matches | 2 | 3 |
| Runs scored | 57 | 68 |
| Batting average | 19.00 | 22.66 |
| 100s/50s | –/– | –/– |
| Top score | 37 | 47 |
| Balls bowled | – | – |
| Wickets | – | – |
| Bowling average | – | – |
| 5 wickets in innings | – | – |
| 10 wickets in match | – | – |
| Best bowling | – | – |
| Catches/stumpings | 2/– | –/– |
- Source: Cricinfo, 20 September 2010

Anthony Tilton Davis (14 August 1931 – 20 November 1978) was an English first-class cricketer. Davis was a right-handed batsman who bowled slow left-arm orthodox. He was born at Reading, Berkshire.

Davis made his Minor Counties Championship debut for Berkshire in 1950 against Cornwall. From 1950 to 1974, he represented the county in 179 Minor Counties Championship matches, the last of which came in the 1974 Championship when Berkshire played Buckinghamshire. He was the Berkshire captain from 1960 to 1970.

Additionally, he also played List-A matches for Berkshire. His List-A debut for the county came against Somerset in the 1965 Gillette Cup. From 1965 to 1966, he represented the county in 3 List-A matches, with his final List-A match coming in the 2nd round of the 1966 Gillette Cup when Berkshire played Gloucestershire at Church Road Cricket Ground in Reading. In his 3 matches, he scored 68 runs at a batting average of 22.66, with a high score of 47.

Davis also played 2 first-class matches during his career. His first came for the Marylebone Cricket Club against Oxford University in 1967, with his second first-class appearance coming in the same year, although this time for a combined Minor Counties team against the touring Pakistanis.

Davis died at Reading, Berkshire on 20 November 1978. He committed suicide by shooting himself. .
