= Druitt =

Druitt is a British surname. It originates from the old French words and names dru (lover), Drue and/or Druet, and is related to the name Drew. Notable people with the surname include:

- Cecil Druitt (1874–1921), Bishop of Grafton in Australia
- George Druitt (1775–1842), Australian pioneer and soldier
- Montague Druitt (1857–1888), one of the suspects in the Jack the Ripper murders
- Robert Druitt (1814–1883), British medical writer
- Tobias Druitt, British author of fantasy novels

== See also ==
- Mount Druitt, suburb of Sydney, New South Wales, Australia
