= Steven Naylor =

English cricketer (born 1977)

Personal information
- Full name: Steven Paul Naylor
- Born: 14 March 1977 (age 49); Billingham, County Durham, England
- Batting: Right-handed
- Bowling: Right-arm fast-medium

Domestic team information
- Years: Team
- 2002-present: Berkshire
- 2000-2001: Buckinghamshire
- 1999: Huntingdonshire

Career statistics
Competition	List A
Matches	6
Runs scored	51
Batting average	12.75
100s/50s	–/–
Top score	23
Balls bowled	288
Wickets	5
Bowling average	42.40
5 wickets in innings	–
10 wickets in match	–
Best bowling	3/28
Catches/stumpings	3/–
- Source: Cricinfo, 25 September 2010

Steven Paul Naylor (born 14 March 1977) is an English cricketer. Naylor is a right-handed chopper batsman who bowls right-arm fast-medium. He was born at Billingham, County Durham.

In 1999, Naylor played for Huntingdonshire in three MCCA Knockout Trophy matches against Oxfordshire, the Leicestershire Cricket Board, and the Nottinghamshire Cricket Board. In 2000, he joined Buckinghamshire where he made his Minor Counties Championship debut against Staffordshire. From 2000 to 2001, he represented the county in fifteen Minor Counties Championship matches, the last of which came against Suffolk in 2001. He also played in the MCCA Knockout Trophy for Buckinghamshire, making his debut in the competition for the county against the Kent Cricket Board. From 2000 to 2001, he represented the county in seven matches, the last of which came against Oxfordshire. Naylor also played two List A matches for the county. His first List-A match for Buckinghamshire came against Wales Minor Counties in the 2000 NatWest Trophy, with his second match coming against the Kent Cricket Board in the 2001 Cheltenham & Gloucester Trophy.

In 2002, he joined Berkshire, making his Minor Counties Championship debut for the county against Cornwall. From 2002 to present, he has represented the county in 47 Minor Counties Championship matches. Naylor also plays in the MCCA Knockout Trophy for Berkshire. His debut in that competition for the county came when Berkshire played the Middlesex Cricket Board in 2002. From 2 to present, he has represented the county in 26 Trophy matches.

Additionally, he also played List A matches for Berkshire. His List A debut for the county came against Ireland in the 1st round of the 2003 Cheltenham & Gloucester Trophy which was played in 2002. From 2002 to 2005, he represented the county in four List A matches, with his final List A match coming when Berkshire played Gloucestershire in the 2005 Cheltenham & Gloucester Trophy at Sonning Lane, Reading. In his combined List A career, he scored 51 runs at a batting average of 12.75, with a high score of 23. With the ball he took 5 wickets at a bowling average of 42.40, with best figures of 3/28.
