= John Iberson =

English cricketer

John Iberson (10 December 1923 – October 1989) was an English cricketer. He was a right-handed batsman and leg-break bowler who played for Hertfordshire. He was born in Barrow-in-Furness and died in Bromley.

Iberson, who debuted in the Minor Counties Championship in 1951 for Kent Second XI, played his first Minor Counties Championship game for Hertfordshire in 1960.

Iberson's debut List A appearance for the team came in the 1964 Gillette Cup, against Durham. From the tailend, he scored 0 not out, and took figures of 1–20 from 4.3 overs.

Iberson played in the competition again in 1966, scoring a duck in a game dominated by Alan Bell, who, in his only one-day appearance, scored 105 runs.
