= Peter Baker (cricketer) =

English cricketer

Personal information
- Full name: Peter Anthony Baker
- Born: 18 September 1945; Crowthorne, Berkshire, England
- Died: 3 October 2000 (aged 55); Stourton, Warwickshire, England
- Batting: Right-handed
- Bowling: Right-arm off break
- Role: Wicketkeeper

Domestic team information
- Years: Team
- 1979 & 1985: Oxfordshire
- 1962–1978: Berkshire

Career statistics
Competition	LA
Matches	2
Runs scored	14
Batting average	7.00
100s/50s	–/–
Top score	9
Balls bowled	–
Wickets	–
Bowling average	–
5 wickets in innings	–
10 wickets in match	–
Best bowling	–
Catches/stumpings	–/–
- Source: Cricinfo, 22 September 2010

Peter Anthony Baker (born 18 September 1945 – 3 October 2000) was an English cricketer. Baker was a right-handed batsman who bowled right-arm off break, although he primarily played as a wicketkeeper. He was born at Crowthorne, Berkshire and educated at Cheltenham College.

Baker made his Minor Counties Championship debut for Berkshire in 1962 against Dorset. From 1962 to 1978, he represented the county in 40 Minor Counties Championship matches, the last of which came in the 1978 Championship when Berkshire played Buckinghamshire.

Additionally, he also played 2 List-A matches for Berkshire. His List-A debut for the county came against Hertfordshire in the 1st round of the 1966 Gillette Cup. His second and final List-A match came in the 2nd round of the same competition when Berkshire played Gloucestershire at Church Road Cricket Ground, Reading. In his 2 matches, he scored 14 runs at a batting average of 7.00, with a high score of 9.

Baker represented Oxfordshire in a single Minor Counties Championship match in 1981 against Devon. In 1985, Baker played his only career MCCA Knockout Trophy match for Oxfordshire against Shropshire.

Baker died at Stourton, Warwickshire on 3 October 2000.
