= Gary Loveday =

English cricketer

Personal information
- Full name: Gary Edward Loveday
- Born: 15 April 1964 (age 62); Eton Wick, Buckinghamshire, England
- Batting: Right-handed
- Bowling: Right-arm medium

Domestic team information
- Years: Team
- 1985-2000: Berkshire

Career statistics
Competition	LA
Matches	13
Runs scored	249
Batting average	19.15
100s/50s	–/1
Top score	56
Balls bowled	–
Wickets	–
Bowling average	–
5 wickets in innings	–
10 wickets in match	–
Best bowling	–
Catches/stumpings	3/–
- Source: Cricinfo, 15 September 2010

Gary Edward Loveday (born 15 April 1964) is a former English cricketer. Loveday was a right-handed batsman who bowled right-arm medium pace. He was born at Eton Wick, Buckinghamshire (now Berkshire).

Loveday made his Minor Counties Championship debut for Berkshire in 1985 against Shropshire. From 1985 to 2000, he represented the county in 134 Minor Counties Championship matches, the last of which came in the 2000 Championship when Berkshire played Oxfordshire at Sonning Lane in Reading. Loveday also played in the MCCA Knockout Trophy for Berkshire. His debut in that competition came in 1987 when Berkshire played Oxfordshire. From 1987 to 2000, he represented the county in 29 Trophy matches, the last of which came when Berkshire played Herefordshire in the 2000 MCCA Knockout Trophy.

Additionally, he also played List-A matches for Berkshire. His List-A debut for the county came against Yorkshire in the 1988 NatWest Trophy. From 1988 to 2000, he represented the county in 13 List-A matches, with his final List-A match coming in the 2000 NatWest Trophy when Berkshire played Durham. In his 13 matches, he scored 249 runs at a batting average of 19.15, with a single half century score of 56. Loveday was the Berkshire captain from 1996 until his retirement in 2000.

In February 2020, he was named in England's squad for the Over-50s Cricket World Cup in South Africa. However, the tournament was cancelled during the third round of matches due to the coronavirus pandemic.
