= Dermott Monteith =

Irish cricketer

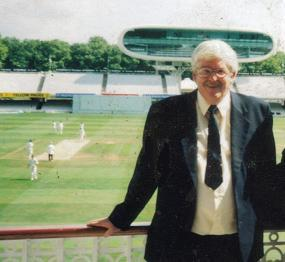

Personal information
- Full name: James Dermott Monteith
- Born: 2 June 1943; Lisburn, County Antrim, Northern Ireland
- Died: 6 December 2009 (aged 66); Bangor, County Down, Northern Ireland
- Nickname: Monty, JD
- Batting: Right-handed
- Bowling: Slow left-arm orthodox

Domestic team information
- Years: Team
- 1965–1984: Ireland
- 1981–1982: Middlesex

Career statistics
Competition	FC	LA
Matches	28	7
Runs scored	530	40
Batting average	15.58	10.00
100s/50s	–/2	–/–
Top score	95	22
Balls bowled	5,543	217
Wickets	94	5
Bowling average	20.64	43.40
5 wickets in innings	7	–
10 wickets in match	1	–
Best bowling	7/38	1/21
Catches/stumpings	23/–	–/–
- Source: Cricinfo, 6 December 2009

James Dermott Monteith (2 June 1943 – 6 December 2009) was an Irish international cricketer. Monteith was a right-handed batsman who bowled slow left-arm orthodox. Monteith was educated at the Royal Belfast Academical Institution and Queen's University Belfast.

== Career ==
Monteith played the majority of his club cricket for Lisburn Cricket Club and also had spells at Queen's University and Middlesex County Cricket Club. He also toured with the Marylebone Cricket Club to Bangladesh and East Africa.

Monteith captained Ireland on 38 occasions, winning 11 times, passing James Boucher's record number of wickets in 1984 and ended his playing career with Ireland with 326 wickets in 76 matches. It remains an Irish record. While a bowling all-rounder, who rarely went in above No 8, on his international debut in 1965 against MCC at Lord's, he scored a half century batting at 4 and didn’t bowl. In his last match he made his highest score of 95.

Monteith took 100 club wickets in a season twice for Lisburn Cricket Club in 1971 and 1973 with his slow left-arm orthodox spin. His maiden century for Lisburn came in 1971.

Monteith was a 38-year-old veteran when he was called upon by Middlesex as cover for John Emburey and Phil Edmonds for the 1981 and 1983 seasons. He proved more than capable at county level, taking 24 wickets in eight County Championship appearances with a best of 5 for 60 against Essex.

Monteith was also an enthusiastic rugby player and played for Bangor Rugby Club. His sporting career ended when he became the victim of a serious hit and run accident in early 1985. Monteith finished his first class cricket career with 94 wickets at 20.64 and 530 runs at 15.58.

== After cricket ==
Monteith later went on to coach cricket at both Bangor Rugby Football and Cricket Club and Donaghadee Cricket Club, even attempting a short lived playing comeback while at Donaghadee. Subsequently, he became a national selector from 1989 to 2001 except in 1999 when he was President of the Irish Cricket Union.

From 2000-2002 he wrote At The Crease: The Dermott Monteith Column for CricketEurope. He published his autobiography, A Stone in the Glasshouse, in 2003. On 6 December 2009 Monteith died in Bangor, County Down, aged 66.
