= Bence =

Bence is a Hungarian male given name, derived from the Latin verb vincere, meaning "to conquer" or "to win". Bence is also used as a surname in several cultures. The name may refer to:

== Given name ==
- Bence Balogh (born 1991), Hungarian football player
- Bence Bárkányi, Hungarian politician
- Bence Batik (born 1993), Hungarian football player
- Bence Biczó (born 1993), Hungarian swimmer
- Bence Bíró (born 1998), Hungarian football player
- Bence Bánhidi (born 1995), Hungarian handball player
- Bence Bátor (born 1977), Hungarian musician
- Bence Deutsch (born 1992), Hungarian football player
- Bence Fodor (born 2002), Hungarian canoeist
- Bence Gyurján (born 1992), Hungarian football player
- Bence Halász (born 1997), Hungarian hammer thrower
- Bence Horváth (canoeist) (born 1992), Hungarian sprint canoeist
- Bence Horváth (footballer) (born 1986), Hungarian football player
- Bence Iszlai (born 1989), Hungarian football player
- Bence Jagodics (born 1994), Hungarian football player
- Bence Lenzsér (born 1996), Hungarian football player
- Bence Ludánszki (born 1990), Hungarian football player
- Bence Mervó (born 1995), Hungarian football player
- Bence Nanay (born 1977), Hungarian philosopher
- Bence Nógrádi (born 2002), Hungarian short-track speed skater
- Bence Penke (born 1994), Hungarian actor
- Bence Pulai (born 1991), Hungarian swimmer
- Bence Pásztor (born 1995), Hungarian hammer thrower
- Bence Rakaczki (1993–2014), Hungarian football player
- Bence Rétvári (born 1979), Hungarian politician
- Bence Somodi (born 1988), Hungarian football
- Bence Szabó (fencer) (born 1962), Hungarian fencer
- Bence Szabó (footballer, born 1990) (born 1990), Hungarian football player
- Bence Szabolcsi (1899–1973), Hungarian music historian
- Bence Zámbó (born 1989), Hungarian football player

== Surname ==
- Bence (surname)
