= Alec Johnson =

English cricketer (1944–2026)

Personal information
- Full name: Anthony Alexander Johnson
- Born: 30 April 1944; Loughborough, Leicestershire, England
- Died: 29 July 2026 (aged 82); Whickham, County Durham, England
- Batting: Right-handed
- Bowling: Right-arm fast-medium

Domestic team information
- Years: Team
- 1974: Minor Counties
- 1974–1977: Northumberland
- 1973: Durham
- 1970–1971: Northumberland
- 1963–1966: Nottinghamshire

Career statistics
Competition	First-class	List A
Matches	27	7
Runs scored	289	31
Batting average	8.75	6.20
100s/50s	–/–	–/–
Top score	45	21
Balls bowled	3,443	437
Wickets	49	13
Bowling average	35.04	16.38
5 wickets in innings	–	–
10 wickets in match	–	–
Best bowling	4/13	4/37
Catches/stumpings	24/–	1/–
- Source: Cricinfo, 2 August 2011

Anthony Alexander Johnson (30 March 1944 – 29 July 2026) was an English cricketer. He was a right-handed batsman who bowled right-arm fast-medium.

== Biography ==
Johnson was born in Loughborough, Leicestershire on 30 March 1944. He made his first-class debut for Nottinghamshire against Surrey in the 1963 County Championship. He made 25 further first-class appearances for the county, the last of which came against Kent in the 1966 County Championship. An infrequent player for Nottinghamshire, he took 49 wickets at an average of 32.28, with best figures of 4/13. With the bat, he scored 273 runs at a batting average of 8.80, with a high score of 45. His List A debut came against Wiltshire in the 1965 Gillette Cup, with Johnson making 2 further appearances in that format for Nottinghamshire, against Somerset in the 2nd round of the same competition and Worcestershire in the 1966 Gillette Cup. In these 3 matches, he took 9 wickets at an average of 12.33, with best figures of 4/37. He left Nottinghamshire at the end of the 1967 season.

He later joined Northumberland, who he made his debut for in the 1970 Minor Counties Championship against Cumberland. He also played his first List A match for the county against Lincolnshire in the 1971 Gillette Cup. He played Minor counties cricket for Northumberland until 1971. In 1973 he played for Durham, making 2 Minor Counties Championship appearances, as well as making a single List A appearance against Essex in the Gillette Cup, a match in which he was dismissed for a single run by Robin Hobbs, while with the ball he bowled 9 wicket-less overs. He rejoined Northumberland in 1974, with Johnson playing Minor counties cricket for the county until 1977, having made a total of 52 Minor Counties Championship appearances. In his second spell with the county, he also made 2 further List A appearances, both coming in the 1977 Gillette Cup against Bedfordshire and Somerset. In his 3 List A appearances for Northumberland, he took 3 wickets at an average of 20.25, with best figures of 2/35. During his second spell with Northumberland, he made his final first-class appearance representing the Minor Counties against the touring Pakistanis at Northumberland's home ground, Osborne Avenue. In this match, he was dismissed for 4 runs by Asif Masood in the Minor Counties first-innings, while in their second he was dismissed by Wasim Raja for 12 runs. With the ball in hand, he conceded 98 runs in the Pakistanis first-innings from 27 overs, but did not take a wicket. In their second-innings he again failed to take a wicket, this time conceding 37 runs from 8 overs.

Johnson died in his sleep in Whickham, County Durham, on 29 July 2026, aged 82.
