= Stewart Seymour =

English cricketer

Personal information
- Full name: Stewart Anthony Seymour
- Born: 3 March 1974 (age 52); Ascot, Berkshire, England
- Batting: Right-handed
- Bowling: Right-arm off break

Domestic team information
- Years: Team
- 1997–2001: Berkshire

Career statistics
Competition	LA
Matches	6
Runs scored	90
Batting average	18.00
100s/50s	–/–
Top score	30
Balls bowled	–
Wickets	–
Bowling average	–
5 wickets in innings	–
10 wickets in match	–
Best bowling	–
Catches/stumpings	2/–
- Source: Cricinfo, 20 September 2010

Stewart Anthony Seymour (born 3 March 1974) is a former English cricketer. Seymour was a right-handed batsman who bowled right-arm off break. He was born at Ascot, Berkshire.

Seymour made his Minor Counties Championship debut for Berkshire in 1997 against Oxfordshire. From 1997 to 2001, he represented the county in 34 Minor Counties Championship matches, the last of which came in the 2001 Championship when Berkshire played Wales Minor Counties. Seymour also played in the MCCA Knockout Trophy for Berkshire. His debut in that competition came in 1997 when Berkshire played Shropshire. From 1997 to 2001, he represented the county in 16 Trophy matches, the last of which came when Berkshire played the Channel Islands in the 2001 MCCA Knockout Trophy.

Additionally, he also played List-A matches for Berkshire. His List-A debut for the county came against Lancashire in the 1997 NatWest Trophy. From 1997 to 2001, he represented the county in 6 List-A matches, with his final List-A match coming in the 2001 Cheltenham & Gloucester Trophy when Berkshire played Essex at Sonning Lane in Reading. In his 6 matches, he scored 90 runs at a batting average of 18.00, with a high score of 30.
