= Drewett =

Drewett is a surname. Notable people with the surname include:

- Brad Drewett (1958–2013), Australian tennis player and ATP official
- Ed Drewett (born 1988), British singer and songwriter
- Hannah Drewett, English triathlete
- John Drewett (1932-2022), English cricketer
- Peter Drewett (1947–2013), English archaeologist and academic
