= Nicholas Wilton =

English cricketer (born 1978)

Personal information
- Full name: Nicholas James Wilton
- Born: 23 September 1978 (age 48); Pembury, Kent, England
- Batting: Right-handed
- Role: Wicketkeeper

Domestic team information
- Years: Team
- 2002: Berkshire
- 1998-2001: Sussex

Career statistics
Competition	FC	LA
Matches	17	19
Runs scored	353	50
Batting average	16.04	4.54
100s/50s	–/1	–/–
Top score	55	17
Balls bowled	–	–
Wickets	–	–
Bowling average	–	–
5 wickets in innings	–	–
10 wickets in match	–	–
Best bowling	–	–
Catches/stumpings	37/3	17/3
- Source: Cricinfo, 25 September 2010

Nicholas James Wilton (born 23 September 1978) is a former English cricketer. Wilton was a right-handed batsman who played primarily as a wicketkeeper. He was born at Pembury, Kent.

Wilton made his first-class debut for Sussex in the 1998 County Championship against Hampshire. From 1998 to 2001, he represented the county in 17 first-class matches, the last of which came against the Australians during their Ashes tour. In his 17 first-class matches, he scored 353 runs at a batting average of 16.04, with a single half century high score of 55. Behind the stumps he took 37 catches and made 3 stumpings.

He made his List-A debut for Sussex in the 1998 AXA League against Glamorgan. From 1998 to 2000, he represented Sussex in 17 List-A matches, the last of which came against Lancashire. Following the 2001 season, Wilton was released by Sussex.

In 2002, he joined Berkshire, making his debut for the county in the 2003 Minor Counties Championship against Cornwall. During the 2002 season, he represented the county in 5 Minor Counties Championship matches, the last of which came against Devon. He also played MCCA Knockout Trophy matches for Berkshire. His debut in that competition for Berkshire came against the Middlesex Cricket Board. He played 2 further Trophy matches for the county against Oxfordshire and Buckinghamshire.

Wilton also represented Berkshire in 2 List-A matches. His first List-A match for the county came against Ireland in the 1st round of the 2003 Cheltenham & Gloucester Trophy, with his second match for the county coming in the 2nd round of the competition against Norfolk at Sonning Lane, Reading. Despite being the 2003 version of the competition, both matches were played in 2002. In his combined List-A career of 19 matches, he scored 50 runs at an average of 4.54, with a high score of 17. Behind the stumps he took 17 catches and made 3 stumpings.

As of 2026, he is the wicketkeeping and fielding coach of the England women's cricket team.
