= William Simpson (cricket umpire) =

English cricket umpire

Personal information
- Full name: William Frederick Simpson
- Born: 1915; Croydon, Surrey, England
- Died: 18 April 1967 (aged 52); Wandsworth, London, England

Umpiring information
- FC umpired: 26 (1949–1966)
- LA umpired: 1 (1966)
- Source: CricketArchive, 14 March 2021

William Frederick Simpson (1915 – 18 April 1967) was an English cricket umpire.

Simpson began officiating in first-class cricket in 1949, when he stood twice in matches involving the Marylebone Cricket Club (MCC) against Essex and Cambridge University at Lord's. He was at the time employed on the staff of the MCC. Shortly thereafter, he began coaching on cricket at RAF Cranwell in Lincolnshire. While engaged at Cranwell, Simpson played minor counties cricket for Lincolnshire in 1951. He stood as an umpire in nearly 50 matches in the Minor Counties Championship between 1954 and 1963, before being appointed to the first-class list of umpires in 1966. Nearly twenty years after he last officiated in first-class cricket, Simpson stood in 25 first-class matches in 1966, in addition to umpiring a single List A one-day match in the quarter-final of the Gillette Cup between Worcestershire and Essex. However, a year after his appointment to the first-class list, Simpson died at Wandsworth in April 1967, at the age of 52.
