= Jonathan Perkins =

English cricketer

Personal information
- Full name: Jonathan Roy Perkins
- Born: 9 October 1978 (age 48); Reading, Berkshire, England
- Batting: Right-handed

Domestic team information
- Years: Team
- 2008: Buckinghamshire
- 1998–2006: Berkshire

Career statistics
Competition	LA
Matches	4
Runs scored	36
Batting average	9.00
100s/50s	–/–
Top score	22
Balls bowled	–
Wickets	–
Bowling average	–
5 wickets in innings	–
10 wickets in match	–
Best bowling	–
Catches/stumpings	2/–
- Source: Cricinfo, 26 September 2010

Jonathan Roy Perkins (born 9 October 1976) is a former English cricketer. Perkins was a right-handed batsman. He was born at Reading, Berkshire.

Perkins made his Minor Counties Championship debut for Berkshire in 1998 against Cheshire. From 1998 to 2005, he represented the county in 22 Minor Counties Championship matches, the last of which came in the 2005 Championship when Berkshire played Oxfordshire. Perkins also played in the MCCA Knockout Trophy for Berkshire. His debut in that competition came in 2001 when Berkshire played Dorset. From 2001 to 2006, he represented the county in 10 Trophy matches, the last of which came when Berkshire played Dorset in the 2006 MCCA Knockout Trophy.

Additionally, he also played List-A matches for Berkshire. His List-A debut for the county came against Lincolnshire in the 1st round of the 2002 Cheltenham & Gloucester Trophy which was played in 2001. From 2001 to 2005, he represented the county in 4 matches, with his final List-A match coming when Berkshire played Gloucestershire in 2005 Cheltenham & Gloucester Trophy at Sonning Lane, Reading. In his 4 matches, he scored 36 runs at a batting average of 9.00, with a high score of 22.

In 2008, he represented Buckinghamshire in 3 MCCA Knockout Trophy matches against Lincolnshire, Cambridgeshire and Dorset.
