= Gary Headley =

English cricketer (born 1966)

Personal information
- Full name: Gary Tyrone Headley
- Born: 5 September 1966 (age 60); Reading, Berkshire, England
- Batting: Right-handed
- Bowling: Right-arm medium

Domestic team information
- Years: Team
- 1988–1994: Berkshire

Career statistics
Competition	LA
Matches	3
Runs scored	35
Batting average	11.66
100s/50s	–/–
Top score	13
Balls bowled	168
Wickets	1
Bowling average	124.00
5 wickets in innings	–
10 wickets in match	–
Best bowling	1/35
Catches/stumpings	–/–
- Source: Cricinfo, 26 September 2010

Gary Tyrone Headley (born 5 September 1966) is a former English List A cricketer. Headley was a right-handed batsman who bowled right-arm medium pace. He was born at Reading, Berkshire.

Headley made his Minor Counties Championship debut for Berkshire in 1988 against Wiltshire. From 1988 to 1994, he represented the county in 30 Minor Counties Championship matches, the last of which came in the 1994 Championship when Berkshire played Cornwall. Headley also played in the MCCA Knockout Trophy for Berkshire. His debut in that competition came in 1990 when Berkshire played Buckinghamshire. From 1990 to 1994, he represented the county in 4 Trophy matches, the last of which came when Berkshire played Buckinghamshire in the 1994 MCCA Knockout Trophy.

Additionally, he also played List-A matches for Berkshire. His List-A debut for the county came against Middlesex in the 1990 NatWest Trophy. From 1990 to 2004, he represented the county in 3 matches, with his final List-A match coming when Berkshire played Kent in 1994 NatWest Trophy at Memorial Ground, Finchampstead. In his 3 matches, he scored 35 runs at a batting average of 11.66, with a high score of 13. With the ball he took a single wicket at a bowling average of 124.00, with best figures of 1/35.

Headley also played Second XI Championship and Second XI Trophy matches for the Glamorgan Second XI, the Middlesex Second XI and the Derbyshire Second XI.
