= Robert Druitt =

British medical writer

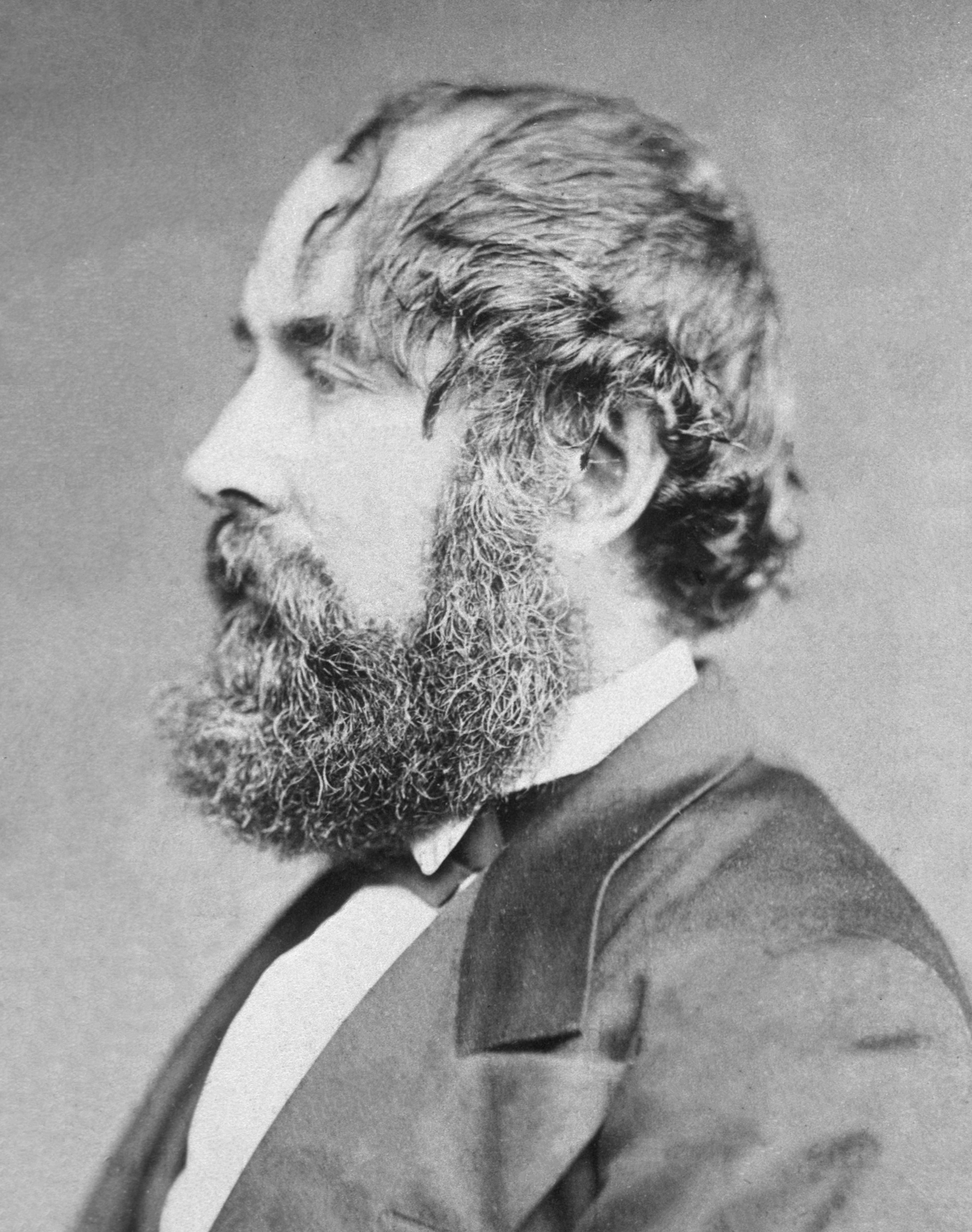
Robert Druitt

Robert Druitt (December 1814 – 15 May 1883), was an English medical writer.

== Biography ==
Druitt, the son of a medical practitioner at Wimborne, Dorset, was born in December 1814. After four years' pupillage by his uncle, Charles Mayo, surgeon to the Winchester Hospital, he entered in 1834 as a medical student at King's College and the Middlesex Hospital in London. He became L.S.A. in 1836, and M.R.C.S. in 1837, and settled in general practice in Bruton Street, Berkeley Square.

In 1839 he published the Surgeon's Vade-Mecum, for which he is best known. Written in a very clear and simple style, it became a great favourite with students, and the production of successive editions occupied much of the author's time. The eleventh edition appeared in 1878, and in all more than forty thousand copies were sold. It was reprinted in America, and translated into several European languages.

In 1845 Druitt became F.R.C.S. by examination, and in 1874 F.R.C.P., later receiving the Lambeth degree of M.D. He practised successfully for many years, and also engaged in much literary work, having for ten years (1862–72) edited the Medical Times and Gazette. He was an earnest advocate of improved sanitation, and from 1856 to 1867 was one of the medical officers of health for St. George's, Hanover Square. From 1864 to 1872 he was president of the Metropolitan Association of Medical Officers of Health, before which he delivered numerous valuable addresses.

In 1872 his health broke down, and he for some time lived in Madras, whence he wrote some interesting "Letters from Madras" to the Medical Times and Gazette. On his retirement 370 medical men and other friends presented him with a cheque for 1,215l. in a silver cup, "in evidence of their sympathy with him in a prolonged illness, induced by years of generous and unwearied labours in the cause of humanity, and as a proof of their appreciation of the services rendered by him as an author and sanitary reformer to both the public and the profession." After an exhausting illness he died at Kensington on 15 May 1883. In 1845 he had married a Miss Hopkinson, who with three sons and four daughters survived him.

Druitt was a man of wide culture, being well versed in languages, as well as in science and theology. Church music was one of his special studies, and as early as 1845 he wrote a Popular Tract on Church Music. Besides his principal work, Druitt wrote a small work on Cheap Wines, their use in Diet and Medicine, which appeared first in the Medical Times and Gazette in 1863 and 1864, and was twice reprinted in an enlarged form in 1865 and 1873. In 1872 he contributed an important article on "Inflammation" to Cooper's Dictionary of Practical Surgery. Among his minor writings may also be mentioned his paper on the "Construction and Management of Human Habitations, considered in relation to the Public Health" (Transactions of the Royal Institute of British Architects, 1859–60).
