= Derek Bridge =

English cricketer

Derek James Wilson Bridge (1921–2012) was an English cricketer who played for Northamptonshire and Oxford University in 1947. He was born in Manchester on 30 November 1921 and died in Builth Wells on 13 March 2012. He appeared in four first-class matches as a righthanded batsman who bowled off spin. He scored 55 runs with a highest score of 25 not out and took five wickets with a best performance of two for 14.
