= Michael Bear =

English cricketer (1934–2000)

Personal information
- Full name: Michael John Bear
- Born: 23 February 1934; Brentwood, Essex, England
- Died: 7 April 2000 (aged 66); Torquay, Devon, England
- Batting: Left-handed
- Role: Opening batsman

Domestic team information
- Years: Team
- 1954–1968: Essex
- FC debut: 22 May 1954 Essex v Derbyshire
- Last FC: 16 August 1968 Essex v Lancashire

Career statistics
Competition	First-class	List A
Matches	322	8
Runs scored	12,564	177
Batting average	24.25	22.12
100s/50s	9/57	0/1
Top score	137	71
Catches/stumpings	113/–	2/–
- Source: CricketArchive, 7 October 2009

Michael John Bear (23 February 1934 – 7 April 2000) played first-class cricket as a left-handed batsman for Essex between 1954 and 1968. As a player, he was generally referred to as "Micky" or "Mickey" Bear.

== Cricket style ==
Bear was a pugnacious left-handed batsman who enjoyed his best cricket years as an opening batsman for Essex, though for the first half of his cricket career he batted further down the order. He was also known as an exceptional fielder: he was, his obituary in Wisden noted, "a pioneer of modern fielding techniques". It went on: "In an era when great athletes were still rare in English cricket, he was a stunningly good outfielder, able to move fast and throw flat, hard returns on the full from the furthest boundaries."

== Cricket career ==
Having played for Essex's second eleven from 1951 and appeared in minor matches for the Royal Air Force while on National Service, Bear made his first-class debut in 1954 against Derbyshire, scoring just one run in an Essex victory in a rain-affected match. He played a few more matches that season and the next for Essex's first team, and then appeared in more than half the side's matches in the 1956 season, making 98 in the match against Kent, but averaging only 17 runs per innings for the season as a whole. Wisden noted in its 1957 edition that Bear's "splendid fielding did much to help Essex reach a high standard in this department".

Bear was a regular member of the Essex team in 1957, missing just four games through the season, but he scored less than 700 runs and his batting average was still just 17. He did, however, make his maiden first-class century, an innings of 123 in the match against Gloucestershire at Romford, in a game where, according to Wisden, "seam bowlers held the upper hand most of the time on a rather green pitch"; no other batsman on either side reached 40 in either innings, and Bear, batting in what was at this stage in his career his accustomed position of No 6 in the order, was the leading contributor enabling Essex to recover from 58 for five to reach a match-winning total of 306 in the first innings.

There was progress in terms of both aggregate (913 first-class runs) and average (26 runs per innings) for Bear in 1958, though no further centuries. His figures were similar in 1959, when he dropped to the second team for some matches.

Bear was appointed provincial coach by the Canterbury Cricket Association for the 1959–60 New Zealand season. His duties included coaching at all levels, from primary school up to Plunket Shield. He also played senior club cricket for East Christchurch. Praising his "enthusiasm and dash", the Association reappointed him for a second season in 1960–61. When the touring MCC team lost several players to injury in January 1961, Bear played in their non-first-class match against the New Zealand Colts team in Ashburton.

In 1960 and the first half of 1961, Bear was out of the Essex first eleven as often as he was in it. However, recalled to the side in July 1961 and used as an opener in the match against Kent at Maidstone in the absence of the regular opener Geoff Smith, he hit 95. When Smith was injured for the first month of the 1962 season, Bear took his place as Gordon Barker's regular opening partner, and remained as an opening batsman for most of the rest of his first-class career, Smith moving down to No 3 on his return to the side. 1962 was by some distance Bear's most successful so far as a batsman. He made 1613 runs in all matches, and was Essex's leading scorer in County Championship games; his batting average rose to nearly 30 runs per innings. He made two centuries to add to his single previous effort five years earlier. Against Middlesex at Lord's in May he scored 117; and with Smith back in the team, Bear made 107 as an opener against Kent at Romford in early June.

The 1962 season set the pattern for Bear for the next few years. In 1963, his season was truncated when he chipped a bone in his ankle while fielding in the match against Worcestershire at Leyton. But he had by then completed his 1000 runs for the season at an average of exactly 30. And in the match against Worcestershire at Worcester earlier in the season, he had improved his highest score, making 132 before he became Jack Flavell's 1000th first-class wicket. In 1964, he improved his highest score again, making 135 against Warwickshire at Ilford with three sixes and 17 fours. He played in every Essex match and hit 1567 runs at an average of 29.56. The following season, though, there was a reversion to Bear's pre-1962 form: he failed to score a century, fell short of 1000 runs and lost his place in the side for a month late in the season.

The downturn was temporary. The 1966 season proved to be Bear's best in first-class cricket with 1833 runs and an average of more than 32. He topped the Essex batting averages in what was, admittedly, a lean year for the side, and scored the higher of only two centuries made by Essex batsmen in Championship matches all summer, 105 out of 190 in an unsuccessful run chase in a rain-affected match against Warwickshire at Birmingham.

The 1967 season was another poor year for Essex, and though Bear hit his career-highest score, 137 against Glamorgan at Cardiff and another fast century, 124 out of an Essex total of 189 against Warwickshire at Westcliff, he was injured from late July and failed to complete 1000 runs. He returned to the team in 1968, when Essex awarded him a benefit, but lost form across the season and at the end of the year retired from first-class cricket to "take up a business appointment".

== After cricket ==
Bear died in Torquay at the age of 66 "after many years of heart trouble".
