= Marcus Simmons =

Marcus Simmons may refer to:

- Marcus Simmons (basketball) (born 1988) American basketball player
- Marcus Simmons (footballer) (born 2000), Guyanese footballer
