= Jim Andrew =

English cricketer

Personal information
- Full name: Frederick James Andrew
- Born: 29 May 1937; Southmead, Bristol, England
- Died: 14 July 1996 (aged 59); Barbados
- Batting: Right-handed
- Bowling: Right-arm fast-medium
- Role: Bowler

Domestic team information
- Years: Team
- 1959–1966: Gloucestershire
- FC debut: 12 August 1959 Gloucestershire v Middlesex
- Last FC: 5 June 1963 Gloucestershire v Surrey
- LA debut: 21 May 1966 Gloucestershire v Berkshire
- Last LA: 22 June 1966 Gloucestershire v Warwickshire

Career statistics
Competition	First-class	List A
Matches	21	2
Runs scored	53	6
Batting average	2.78	–
100s/50s	0/0	0/0
Top score	6	6*
Balls bowled	3,559	126
Wickets	57	4
Bowling average	23.96	19.50
5 wickets in innings	2	0
10 wickets in match	1	0
Best bowling	5/8	2/37
Catches/stumpings	13/–	1/–
- Source: CricketArchive, 8 September 2008

Frederick James Andrew (29 May 1937 – 14 July 1996) was an English cricketer who played for Gloucestershire. He made his first-class debut against Middlesex, and also played two List A matches. A fast-medium bowler, he made his first-class debut against Middlesex in 1959. He also played two List A matches in the Gillette Cup in 1966.

Andrew was always regarded as a bowler; in both forms of the game, he failed to score more than six runs in an innings. However, he did score 29 against Worcestershire Second XI for Gloucestershire Second XI, for whom he took 111 wickets in 55 matches.

His finest first-class appearance was against Kent in May 1962, when he took 5 wickets for just 8 runs in the Kent first innings. Andrew played his last first-class match in 1963, but was a regular of the Second XI until 1965, played in the 1966 Gillette Cup, and played three further Second XI matches in 1968, 1969 and 1972. He ended his career having taken 57 first-class wickets at a respectable average of 23.96.

When he left Gloucestershire he took over from ex England and Gloucestershire player Reg Sinfield as the cricket professional at Clifton College. He mentored both Matthew Windows and James Kirtley.
