= Richard Hardstaff =

English cricketer (1863–1932)

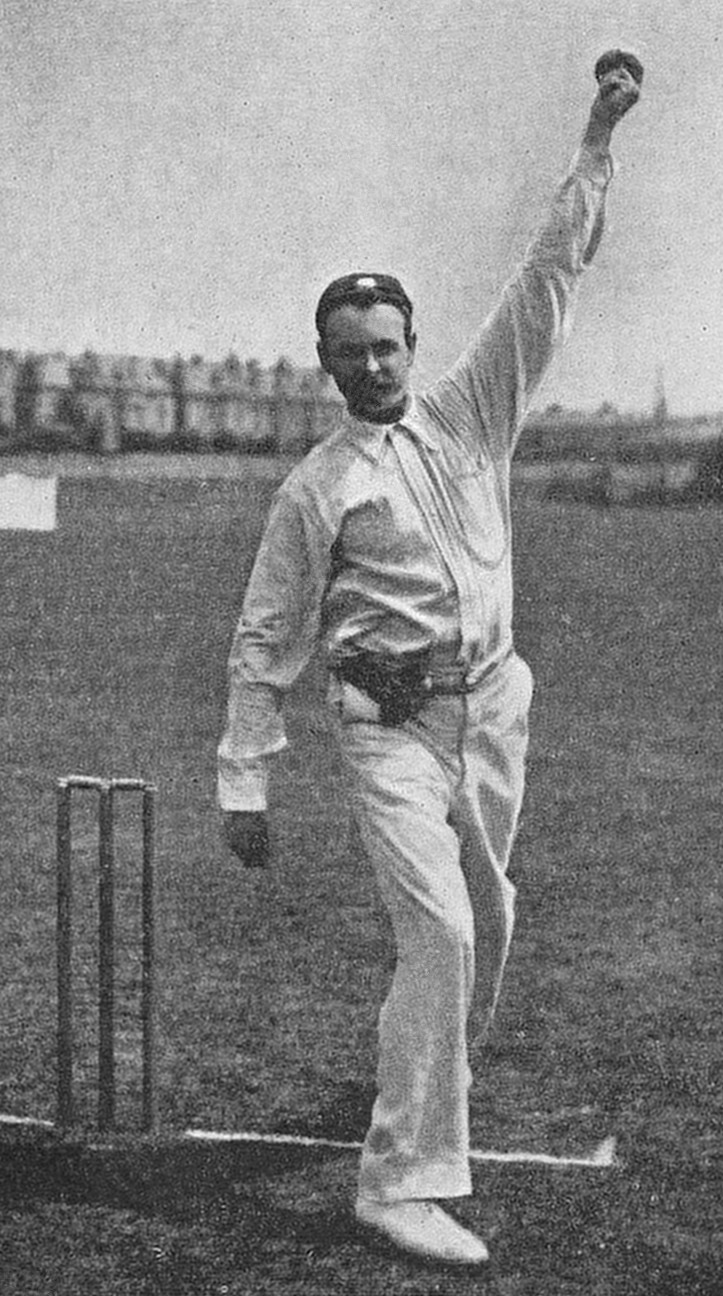

Personal information
- Full name: Richard Green Hardstaff
- Born: 12 January 1863; Selston, Nottinghamshire, England
- Died: 18 April 1932 (aged 69); Selston, Nottinghamshire, England
- Batting: Left-handed
- Bowling: Left-arm medium

Domestic team information
- Years: Team
- 1887–1899: Nottinghamshire

Career statistics
Competition	First-class
Matches	30
Runs scored	252
Batting average	8.12
100s/50s	0/1
Top score	60
Balls bowled	4,752
Wickets	100
Bowling average	19.88
5 wickets in innings	8
10 wickets in match	3
Best bowling	8/53
Catches/stumpings	17/–
- Source: CricketArchive, 8 November 2012

Richard Hardstaff (12 January 1863 – 18 April 1932) was an English cricketer who played first-class cricket for Nottinghamshire from 1887 to 1899 and played as a professional in the Lancashire League for Rawtenstall.

== Cricket career ==
Hardstaff made his first-class debut for Nottinghamshire against Marylebone Cricket Club (MCC) in June 1887. Batting at number 10, he made his highest score of 60 in a County Championship match versus Derbyshire in June 1896. In the same match Hardstaff recorded his best bowling of 8-53. Hardstaff played in 40 matches as professional for Lancashire League club Rawtenstall from 1893 to 1900.
