= Richard Lewis (cricketer, born 1947) =

English cricketer

Personal information
- Full name: Richard Victor Lewis
- Born: 6 August 1947 (age 79); Winchester, Hampshire, England
- Batting: Right-handed
- Bowling: Leg break

Domestic team information
- Years: Team
- 1967–1976: Hampshire
- 1977–1986: Dorset
- 1979–1983: Minor Counties

Career statistics
Competition	First-class	List A
Matches	105	97
Runs scored	3,741	1,365
Batting average	19.72	17.27
100s/50s	2/15	–/6
Top score	136	79
Balls bowled	132	0
Wickets	1	–
Bowling average	104.00	–
5 wickets in innings	–	–
10 wickets in match	–	–
Best bowling	1/59	–
Catches/stumpings	65/–	22/–
- Source: Cricinfo, 4 January 2010

Richard Victor Lewis (born 6 August 1947) is an English former cricketer who played first-class cricket for Hampshire and minor counties cricket for Dorset.

== Biography ==
Lewis was born in Winchester in August 1947 where his Father was an amateur sportsman. Lewis was educated at Peter Symonds College. Lewis signed for Hampshire in 1967, making his first-class debut against Oxford University that year. In 1968 he became a regular player in the Hampshire team after making his County Championship debut against Somerset. He played in twelve first-class matches in 1968, scoring 349 runs at an average of average of 17.45, including a single century, 114 against Oxford University. In the 1969 season he made his List A debut against Yorkshire.

Lewis spent nine years with Hampshire, during which he played 103 first-class matches and was a member of Hampshire's 1973 County Championship winning squad. He scored 3282 runs for Hampshire at an average of 18.97, with a highest score of 136. He made two centuries and thirteen fifties, and took 65 catches. In List A cricket Lewis played 82 matches, scoring 1,173 runs at an average of 18.04, including five fifties and a highest score of 79. At the end of the 1976 County Championship he left Hampshire.

In 1977 Lewis began playing Minor Counties cricket for Dorset. He played 82 Minor Counties Championship matches between 1977 and 1989. He represented Minor Counties West three times in the Benson and Hedges Cup. In the 1979 season he played a first-class match for a Minor Counties team against the touring Indians. Also in 1979 he made three List-A appearances for the Minor Counties South in the Benson and Hedges Cup. From 1980 to 1983 Lewis represented the Minor Counties in Benson and Hedges Cup matches. In 1981 he represented the team in his final first-class match against the touring Sri Lankans.

Lewis toured Bangladesh with the MCC in 1980–81.

In 1983 Lewis made his Dorset List A debut in the 1983 NatWest Trophy against Essex. His final List A match came in the same competition in 1986 against Somerset. At the end of the 1986 Minor Counties Championship season he retired from representative cricket.
