= Colin Casemore =

Welsh cricketer

Personal information
- Full name: Colin Casemore
- Born: 21 February 1940 (age 86); Cardiff, Glamorgan, Wales
- Batting: Right-handed
- Bowling: Leg break

Domestic team information
- Years: Team
- 1970–1977: Berkshire

Career statistics
Competition	List A
Matches	1
Runs scored	6
Batting average	6.00
100s/50s	–/–
Top score	6
Balls bowled	–
Wickets	–
Bowling average	–
5 wickets in innings	–
10 wickets in match	–
Best bowling	–
Catches/stumpings	–/–
- Source: Cricinfo, 7 August 2012

Colin Casemore (born 21 February 1940) was an English cricketer. He was a right-handed batsman and a leg-break bowler who played for Berkshire. He was born in St Mellons.

Casemore, who made three appearances for Sussex Second XI between 1960 and 1961, made his Minor Counties Championship debut for Berkshire in 1970, and played in the competition until 1977. He made a single List A appearance for the team, in the 1976 Gillette Cup, against Hertfordshire. Casemore scored 6 runs from the upper-middle order.
