= Harry Hall (cricketer) =

English cricketer

Personal information
- Full name: Harry Mark Hall
- Born: 19 November 1970 (age 55); Wokingham, Berkshire, England
- Batting: Right-handed
- Bowling: Slow left-arm orthodox
- Relatives: Thomas Hall (brother)

Domestic team information
- Years: Team
- 1994–2000: Berkshire

Career statistics
Competition	LA
Matches	6
Runs scored	189
Batting average	31.50
100s/50s	1/–
Top score	108
Balls bowled	42
Wickets	–
Bowling average	–
5 wickets in innings	–
10 wickets in match	–
Best bowling	–
Catches/stumpings	4/–
- Source: Cricinfo, 7 August 2010

Harry Mark Hall (born 19 November 1970) is a former English cricketer. Hall was a right-handed batsman who bowled slow left-arm orthodox. He was born at Wokingham, Berkshire.

Hall made his debut for Berkshire in the 1994 Minor Counties Championship against Cornwall. From 1994 to 2000, he represented the county in 10 Minor Counties Championships matches, with his final appearance for the county in that competition coming against Cornwall. He also represented Berkshire in 10 MCCA Knockout Trophy matches from 1993 to 2000.

Hall also represented Berkshire in List-A cricket, with his debut List-A game coming against Leicestershire in the 1996 NatWest Trophy. He represented the county in 5 further List-A matches, with his final List-A appearance for the county coming against Durham in 2000 NatWest Trophy. In his 6 matches, he scored 189 runs at a batting average of 31.50 and a single century high score of 108.

== Family ==
His brother Thomas also represented Berkshire in Minor Counties and List-A cricket.
