= Martin Horton =

English cricketer and coach (1934–2011)

Personal information
- Full name: Martin John Horton
- Born: 21 April 1934; Worcester, England
- Died: 3 April 2011 (aged 76); Worcester, England
- Batting: Right-handed
- Bowling: Right-arm offbreak

International information
- National side: England
- Test debut: 4 June 1959 v India
- Last Test: 18 June 1959 v India

Domestic team information
- Years: Team
- 1952–1966: Worcestershire
- 1967/68–1970/71: Northern Districts

Career statistics
Competition	Test	FC	LA
Matches	2	410	9
Runs scored	60	19,945	278
Batting average	30.00	29.54	34.75
100s/50s	0/1	23/112	1/1
Top score	58	233	114
Balls bowled	238	54,352	340
Wickets	2	825	7
Bowling average	29.50	26.94	20.28
5 wickets in innings	0	40	0
10 wickets in match	0	7	–
Best bowling	2/24	9/56	2/20
Catches/stumpings	2/–	166/–	3/–
- Source: Cricinfo, 7 November 2022

Martin John Horton (21 April 1934 – 3 April 2011) was an English cricketer, who played in two Tests in 1959. He was born in Worcester, England, and played the bulk of his first-class cricket for his native county. After his career in England, he became New Zealand's first national cricket coach.

The cricket writer Colin Bateman described Horton as "a versatile all-rounder who could bat anywhere in the top six and who twice took more than 100 wickets in a season with his off-spin".

== Life and career ==
Horton made his debut for Worcestershire in 1952, and was an integral part of the side which won the County Championship in 1964 (for the first time in the county's history) and 1965. He passed 1,000 runs in a season on 11 occasions, scoring 2,468 runs in 1959, the year he won his two Test caps. He scored a half-century against India in his first Test and took 2 for 24 in his second, but those were his only Tests. He achieved the double in 1955 and 1961, and he took 9 for 56 against the 1955 South Africans. In nearly two decades of cricket, he took 825 first-class wickets in all and scored 23 centuries with the bat. His highest first-class score was 233 against Somerset in 1962, when he took part in a third-wicket stand of 314 with Tom Graveney.

In December 1966, Horton arrived in New Zealand to begin a five-year contract as the national coach, his duties including "a stock-taking of New Zealand cricket; the organisation of the instruction of coaches in various centres; and the coaching of national Test and colts teams". He eventually held the position for seventeen seasons. He also played four seasons in the Plunket Shield with Northern Districts from 1967–68 to 1970–71. He returned to England in 1983 to become cricket coach at the Royal Grammar School, a post he held until 1996. He also became chairman of Worcestershire County Cricket Club. In 2010 he received the Bert Sutcliffe Award for services to New Zealand cricket.

Horton died in Worcester following a long illness in April 2011. He and his wife Margaret had one daughter.
