= Gordon Child =

Welsh cricketer

Personal information
- Full name: Gordon Edward James Child
- Born: 7 November 1939 (age 87); Mumbles, Glamorgan, Wales
- Batting: Right-handed
- Role: Wicketkeeper

Domestic team information
- Years: Team
- 1967-1985: Berkshire

Career statistics
Competition	LA
Matches	5
Runs scored	33
Batting average	8.25
100s/50s	–/–
Top score	12*
Balls bowled	–
Wickets	–
Bowling average	–
5 wickets in innings	–
10 wickets in match	–
Best bowling	–
Catches/stumpings	6/1
- Source: Cricinfo, 21 September 2010

Gordon Edward James Child (born 7 November 1939) is a former Welsh cricketer. Child was a right-handed batsman who played primarily as a wicketkeeper. He was born at Mumbles, Glamorgan.

Child made his Minor Counties Championship debut for Berkshire in 1967 against Wiltshire. From 1967 to 1985, he represented the county in 167 Minor Counties Championship matches, the last of which came in the 1985 Championship when Berkshire played Dorset. Child also played in the MCCA Knockout Trophy for Berkshire. His debut in that competition came in 1983 when Berkshire played Norfolk. From 1983 to 1985, he represented the county in 5 Trophy matches, the last of which came when Berkshire played Shropshire in the 1985 MCCA Knockout Trophy. Child captained Berkshire from 1979 to 1981.

Additionally, he also played List-A matches for Berkshire. His List-A debut for the county came against Hertfordshire in the 1976 Gillette Cup. From 1976 to 1985, he represented the county in 5 matches, with his final List-A match coming when Berkshire played Hampshire in the 1985 NatWest Trophy at the County Ground, Southampton. In his 5 matches, he scored 33 runs at a batting average of 8.25, with a high score of 12*. Behind the stumps he took 6 catches and made a single stumping.
