= Thomas Hall (cricketer, born 1969) =

English cricketer

Personal information
- Full name: Thomas Leonard Hall
- Born: 14 June 1969 (age 57); Wokingham, Berkshire, England
- Batting: Right-handed
- Relatives: Harry Hall (brother)

Domestic team information
- Years: Team
- 1995–1997 & 2002: Berkshire

Career statistics
Competition	LA
Matches	2
Runs scored	8
Batting average	4.00
100s/50s	–/–
Top score	8
Balls bowled	–
Wickets	–
Bowling average	–
5 wickets in innings	–
10 wickets in match	–
Best bowling	–
Catches/stumpings	1/–
- Source: Cricinfo, 7 August 2010

Thomas Leonard Hall (born 14 June 1969) is a former English cricketer. Hall was a right-handed batsman. He was born at Wokingham, Berkshire.

Hall made his debut for Berkshire in the 1995 Minor Counties Championship against Dorset. From 1995 to 1997, he represented the county in 10 Minor Counties Championship matches. In 2002, he represented the county again in two Minor County Championship matches, with his final appearance for the county coming against Devon. He also represented Berkshire in four MCCA Knockout Trophy matches, one in 1996 and three in 2002.

Hall also represented Berkshire in List A cricket, with his debut List A game coming against Leicestershire in the 1996 NatWest Trophy. He represented the county in a further List A match against Ireland in 1st round of the 2003 Cheltenham & Gloucester Trophy which was played in 2002. In his two matches, he scored 8 runs at a batting average of 4.00 and a highest score of 8.

== Family ==
His brother Harry also represented Berkshire in Minor Counties and List-A cricket.
