= Bence Penke =

Hungarian voice actor

- Born: November 9, 1994 (age 31); Budapest, Hungary
- Occupation: Voice actor

Bence Penke (born November 9, 1994) is a Hungarian voice actor from Budapest, the capital of Hungary.

== Career ==
Penke contributes to voicing characters that appears in movies, cartoons, anime, and live action shows. He is best known as the Hungarian voice of Phineas Flynn in the Hungarian version of Disney Channel animated series Phineas and Ferb. He also voices Konohamaru, a supporting character in the Animax Hungarian version of popular anime series Naruto. He also voices Konohamaru in the Jetix Hungarian version.

== Dubbing Contributions ==
=== Anime and animation ===
- Konohamaru in Naruto (Jetix and Animax editions)
- Mitsuhiko Tsuburaya in Detective Conan
- Baron Leltoy in Bakugan Battle Brawlers: New Vestroia
- Gorganzola in Chowder
- Phineas Flynn in Phineas and Ferb
- Phineas Flynn/Phineas-2 in Phineas and Ferb the Movie: Across the 2nd Dimension
- Mac (Second voice) in Foster's Home for Imaginary Friends
- Pantalaimon in The Golden Compass
- Dashiell "Dash" Robert Parr in The Incredibles
- Pazu in Castle in the Sky
- Adam Lyon in My Gym Partner's a Monkey
- Sam Kincaid in Inazuma Eleven
- Son Gohan in Dragon Ball Super

=== Live action shows ===
- Stevie in Malcolm in the Middle
- Sam Camden in 7th Heaven
- Sam Camden in 7th Heaven
- Tom Marvolo Riddle (teenager) in Harry Potter and the Half-Blood Prince
- Jared Grace and Simon Grace in The Spiderwick Chronicles
- Nicky Daley in Night at the Museum
- Jake Harper in Two and a Half Men
- Joey Naylor in Thank You for Smoking
- Jacob Black in Twilight
- George Llewelyn Davies in Finding Neverland
- PJ Duncan in Good Luck Charlie
- Elliot Gilbert (Second voice) in H_{2}O: Just Add Water (Second dub)
- Rico Suave (First voice) in Hannah Montana
- Preston in Super 8
- Budderball in Air Buddies
- Buddha in Snow Buddies
- Paul Blaine in The Canterville Ghost
- Jake in Single Santa seeks Mrs Claus'
- Tom in Malabar Princess
- Conor in Gamer's Guide to Pretty Much Everything
- Young Sportacus in Lazy Town
