= Richard van der Knaap =

South African cricketer

Personal information
- Full name: Richard Saunders van der Knaap
- Born: 20 April 1947 (age 79); Johannesburg, Transvaal Province, South Africa
- Batting: Right-handed
- Bowling: Right-arm medium
- Relatives: David van der Knaap (brother)

Domestic team information
- Years: Team
- 1975–1976: Berkshire

Career statistics
| Competition | LA |
|---|---|
| Matches | 1 |
| Runs scored | 12 |
| Batting average | – |
| 100s/50s | –/– |
| Top score | 12* |
| Balls bowled | 61 |
| Wickets | 1 |
| Bowling average | 20.00 |
| 5 wickets in innings | – |
| 10 wickets in match | – |
| Best bowling | 1/20 |
| Catches/stumpings | –/– |
- Source: Cricinfo, 17 July 2010

Richard Saunders van der Knaap (born 20 April 1947) is a former South African cricketer. Van der Knaap was a right-handed batsman who bowled right-arm medium pace. He was born in Johannesburg, Transvaal Province.

Van der Knaap made his debut for Berkshire in the 1975 Minor Counties Championship against Buckinghamshire. Van der Knaap represented the county in 4 Minor Counties matches, with his final Minor Counties appearance coming against Hertfordshire.

In 1976, Van der Knaap also represented Berkshire in a single List-A match against Hertfordshire in the Gillette Cup. In his only List-A match, he scored 12* with the bat, while with the ball he took a single wicket, although with a good economy rate of 1.96 runs per over from his 10.1 overs.

== Family ==
His brother David represented Lancashire and Transvaal in first-class cricket.
