= Peter Johnson (Nottinghamshire cricketer) =

English cricketer (born 1949)

Peter David Johnson (born 12 November 1949 in Sherwood) is an English former first-class cricketer active 1972–82 who played for Nottinghamshire.
