= Peter Baker (Australian footballer) =

Australian rules footballer

Personal information
- Full name: Peter Baker
- Born: 21 October 1940
- Original team: Surrey Hills
- Height: 177 cm (5 ft 10 in)
- Weight: 75 kg (165 lb)

Playing career^{1}
Years	Club	Games (Goals)
1960	Melbourne	1 (0)
- ^{1} Playing statistics correct to the end of 1960.

Peter Baker (born 21 October 1940) is a former Australian rules footballer who played with Melbourne in the Victorian Football League (VFL).
