= Tim Cartmell =

American martial artist

Tim Cartmell is a martial artist best known as an author and translator of martial arts books. He is an Eighth Degree Black Belt (Master) in Kung-Fu San Soo, and a Fourth Degree Black Belt in Brazilian jiu-jitsu. Tim is an expert in Sun-style tai chi, including all three martial arts under the Sun system originally taught by founder Sun Lutang. They are tai chi, xingyiquan, and bagua. He started his martial arts career winning full-contact tournaments in Taiwan using xingyiquan. He placed first at the 2003 IBJJF Pan Championship as a brown belt (Senior 2), and first at the 2004 IBJJF Pan Championship as a black belt (Senior 2).

== Publications ==
- Principles, Analysis, and Application of Effortless Combat Throws Publisher: Unique Publications (August 1998) ISBN 1-883175-06-2 or 0865681767
- Xing Yi Nei Gong: Xing Yi Health Maintenance and Internal Strength Development by Dan Miller, Tim Cartmell; Publisher: Unique Publications (October 1998) ISBN 0-86568-174-0
- A Study of Taijiquan by Sun Lutang, Tim Cartmell (Translator), Publisher: North Atlantic Books (June 2003), ISBN 1-55643-462-6
- A Detailed Analysis of the Art of Seizing and Locking by Zhao Da Yuan, Translated by Tim Cartmell
- The Method of Chinese Wrestling by Tong Zhongyi, Tim Cartmell (Translator), Publisher: North Atlantic Books (November 9, 2005) ISBN 1-55643-609-2
- "Standing Grappling: Escapes and Counters" DVD December 2006
- "Traditional Sun Style Taijiquan" by Tim Cartmell, Troyce Thome, Publisher: Learning Solutions; 1 edition (September 17, 2010) ISBN 978-0-07-803914-0
