= Mark Stevens (attorney) =

American lawyer

Mark Stevens (born in Lynn, Massachusetts) is a criminal defense lawyer in Salem, New Hampshire. He graduated from the University of New Hampshire and the Massachusetts School of Law. His publications include, A Practical Guide to Trying DWI Cases in New Hampshire (2010) and the Pocket Guide to Juror Voir Dire in Massachusetts: Criminal Practice (2015). His clients have included Jeffrey Dingman, who was paroled in 2014 after a double murder conviction for killing his parents. Stevens also represented Pamela Smart co-conspirators Patrick Randall in 2015, and Vance Lattime, Jr. in 2005. In 2011, he represented John Coughlin in a widely covered speeding case. Coughlin was cited by state police for driving 102 miles per hour because his wife was delivering a baby as he rushed to the hospital; his speeding charge was dismissed after trial. In 2016, Stevens successfully obtained a court order forcing the State of New Hampshire to return the handgun used as the murder weapon in the case of State v. Pamela Smart.

== Solicitor ==
Stevens began his legal career as a freelancer in 1975 before becoming a defence lawyer.
