= Frederick Millett =

English cricketer

Cricket information
- Batting: Right-handed
- Bowling: Right-arm off-break

Career statistics
Competition	First-class	List A
Matches	7	12
Runs scored	312	180
Batting average	31.20	18.00
100s/50s	1/1	0/0
Top score	102*	35
Balls bowled	193	551
Wickets	2	8
Bowling average	53.00	40.87
5 wickets in innings	0	0
10 wickets in match	0	0
Best bowling	1/4	2/26
Catches/stumpings	2/–	4/–
- Source: CricketArchive, 30 December 2021

Frederick William Millett MBE (30 March 1928 – 30 April 1991) was an English cricketer.

== Playing career ==
A right-handed batsman and right-arm off-break bowler, Millett played for Cheshire from 1949 to 1972, captaining them from 1960 to 1970. In 210 Minor Counties Championship matches, he scored 8432 runs and took 300 wickets.

He also played seven first-class matches for the Minor Counties combined side against various touring Test teams. His best score in these matches was an unbeaten innings of 102 against the West Indies in 1969, a match in which he was also captain.

He played twelve List A matches, four of which were for Cheshire in the Gillette Cup, the remainder for a Minor Counties North team in the Benson & Hedges Cup.

After he finished playing for Cheshire, Millett served on the Marylebone Cricket Club's cricket committee, serving as player manager on a tour to the U.S. in 1982. He also played for the MCC in several minor matches against Ireland and Scotland.

== Death ==
Millett died in hospital in his native Macclesfield on 30 April 1991 from a heart attack following a car accident.
