= Sarah Cartmell =

British bioengineer

- Born: Sarah Harriet Cartmell
- Education: University of Liverpool (PhD)
- Scientific career
- Fields: Bioengineering; CT imaging Bioreactor design Orthopaedics
- Workplaces: The University of Manchester; Keele University; Georgia Institute of Technology
- Thesis: A degradable bioactive glass : an in vitro and in vivo study (1999)
- Website: www.research.manchester.ac.uk/portal/sarah.cartmell.html

Sarah Harriet Cartmell is a British biomaterials scientist and Professor of Bioengineering at the University of Manchester. She specializes on the potential use of electrical regimes to influence cellular activity for orthopaedic tissue engineering applications.

== Early life and education ==
Cartmell studied Materials Science with Clinical Engineering at the University of Liverpool and graduated in 1996. Continuing her studies at Liverpool, she earned a PhD in Clinical Engineering in 2000.

== Research and career ==
Cartmell's research interests are in bioengineering, CT imaging, bioreactor design and orthopaedics.

After completing her doctorate, she furthered her studies at Georgia Tech. After two years in Atlanta, Cartmell came back to the UK and joined Keele University as a postdoctoral research fellow, gaining her lectureship in 2004 and senior lectureship in 2008 in orthopaedic tissue engineering.

Cartmell joined the Department of Materials, Faculty of Science and Engineering at The University of Manchester in 2010 as a Reader in biomaterials, and was promoted to full Professor in 2014. She continues to investigate the use of bioreactors, X-ray imaging, and the response of orthopaedic cells to a variety of stimuli such as mechanical forces, electrical stimulus, statins and a variety of different novel materials to support their growth into the correct tissue type/shape.

Cartmell serves as head of the department of materials at the school of natural sciences at the University of Manchester, and the UK Biomedical Materials champion for the Henry Royce Institute of a £235 million UK government investment for advanced materials. She is co-director of the Engineering and Physical Sciences Research Council Centre for Doctoral Training in Advanced Biomedical Materials, combining the strength and track record in biomaterials innovation, translation and industrial engagement at the University of Manchester and the University of Sheffield.
