= Robert Pitcher =

English cricketer

Robert Pitcher (born 29 April 1964) was an English cricketer. He was a right-handed batsman and a left-arm slow bowler who played for Berkshire. He was born in Welwyn Garden City.

Pitcher, who represented Berkshire in the Minor Counties Championship from 1993 to 1995, made a single List A appearance for the team, during the 1995 NatWest Trophy, against Surrey. From the lower order, he scored 16 not out, though he was unable to save the team from a nine-wicket defeat.
