= Mark Stevens (cricketer) =

English cricketer

Personal information
- Full name: Mark Edward Stevens
- Born: 16 March 1959 (age 67); Taunton, Somerset, England
- Batting: Right-handed
- Role: Wicketkeeper

Domestic team information
- Years: Team
- 1981–1982: Devon
- 1983–1993: Berkshire

Career statistics
Competition	LA
Matches	5
Runs scored	34
Batting average	17.00
100s/50s	–/–
Top score	23
Balls bowled	–
Wickets	–
Bowling average	–
5 wickets in innings	–
10 wickets in match	–
Best bowling	–
Catches/stumpings	2/1
- Source: Cricinfo, 21 September 2010

Mark Edward Stevens (born 16 March 1959) is a former English cricketer. Stevens was a right-handed batsman who played primarily as a wicketkeeper.

Stevens made his Minor Counties Championship debut for Devon in 1981 against the Somerset Second XI. From 1981 to 1982, he represented Devon in 9 Minor Counties Championship matches. In 1983, he joined Berkshire, making his Minor Counties Championship debut for the county in 1983 against Shropshire. From 1983 to 1993, he represented the county in 58 Minor Counties Championship matches, the last of which came in the 1993 Championship when Berkshire played Wales Minor Counties. Stevens also played in the MCCA Knockout Trophy for Berkshire. His debut in that competition came in 1986 when Berkshire played Buckinghamshire. From 1986 to 1993, he represented the county in 11 Trophy matches, the last of which came when Berkshire played Hertfordshire in the 1993 MCCA Knockout Trophy.

Additionally, he also played List-A matches for Berkshire. His List-A debut for the county came against Gloucestershire in the 1986 NatWest Trophy. From 1986 to 1991, he represented the county in 5 matches, with his final List-A match coming when Berkshire played Hampshire in the 1991 NatWest Trophy at Sonning Lane, Reading. In his 5 matches, he scored 34 runs at a batting average of 17.00, with a high score of 23. Behind the stumps he took 2 catches and made a single stumping.
