= Peter E. Baker (geologist) =

- Born: 1937
- Died: 2008 (aged 70–71)
- Education: Oxford University
- Scientific career
- Workplaces: University of Leeds (1969–1978), University of Nottingham (1978–1989), University of Leeds (1989–1998)

Peter Edward Baker (1937–2008) was a notable British volcanologist, professor emeritus of Igneous Petrology in the School of Earth Sciences (now Earth & Environment), University of Leeds.

== Life ==
Baker graduated in Geology from University of Sheffield in 1960. He then became a PhD research student and later a research fellow at Oxford University. Baker was appointed to a lectureship at the University of Leeds (1969) and later reader (1976). He was appointed Professor of Geology at the University of Nottingham from 1978 to 1989. Following the Oxburgh review of Earth Science departments, Baker returned to Leeds. He retired in 1998.

Baker's work was mainly on volcanoes and volcanic rocks of island arcs and oceanic islands. His work began with Mount Misery volcano on the West Indian island of Saint Kitts; continuing with the volcanoes on the islands of Saint Vincent, Montserrat and Saba, Lesser Antilles. When the volcano Tristan da Cunha, in the South Atlantic, erupted in 1961, Baker joined a Royal Society expedition led by Ian G. Gass to investigate.

A lava specimen from Cook Island, South Sandwich Islands was the nearest terrestrial equivalent to some of the boulders analysed during the Mars Pathfinder mission of the late 1990s. The South Sandwich Islands are the type example of a primitive oceanic island-arc. Baker worked there and at Deception Island, off the Antarctic Peninsula, as it had a series of volcanic eruptions (1968–70).

Baker worked on Ojos del Salado, on the Argentina–Chile border, the highest active volcano in the world. He made a geological map of Easter Island and worked on the Juan Fernandez Islands, which lie between Easter Island and Chile. Peter Baker was secretary general of the International Association of Volcanology and Chemistry of the Earth's Interior (IAVCEI, 1975–1983) and he was on the editorial board of the Journal of Volcanology and Geothermal Research since 1976.

== Selected publications ==
- Mount Liamuiga (former Misery) volcano on the West Indian island of Saint Kitts, West Indies:
  - Baker, P. E. (1963). The geology of Mt. Misery volcano, St. Kitts. Unpublished D. Phil thesis, Oxford University.
  - Baker, P. E. (1968). Petrology of Mt. Misery volcano, St. Kitts, West Indies. Lithos, 1(2): 124-150.
  - Baker, P. E. (1969). The geological history of Mt Misery volcano, St Kitts, West Indies. HM Stationery Office.
  - Baker, P. E., & Holland, J. G. (1973). Geochemical variations in a pyroclastic succession on St. Kitts, West Indies. Bulletin Volcanologique, 37(4): 472-490.
  - Baker, P.E. (1980). The Geological history of Mt. Misery Volcano, St. Kitts, West Indies. Overseas Geology and Mineral Resources, 10(3): 207-230.
  - Baker, P. E. (1985). Volcanic hazards on St Kitts and Montserrat, West Indies. Journal of the Geological Society, 142(2): 279-295.
- South Sandwich Islands, eastern margin of the Scotia Sea:
  - Baker, P. E., Holdgate, M. W., Longton, R. E., Tilbrook, P. J., Tomblin, J. F., Vaughan, R. W., & Wynne-Edwards, C. J. C. (1964). A survey of the South Sandwich Islands.
  - Baker, P. E. (1990). E. South Sandwich Islands. Volcanoes of the Antarctic Plate and Southern Oceans, 360-395.
  - Pearce, J. A., Baker, P. E., Harvey, P. K., & Luff, I. W. (1995). Geochemical evidence for subduction fluxes, mantle melting and fractional crystallization beneath the South Sandwich island arc. Journal of Petrology, 36(4): 1073-1109.
- Deception Island, South Shetland Islands archipelago off the Antarctic Peninsula:
  - Baker, P. E. (1969). Investigations of the 1967 and 1969 volcanic eruptions on Deception Island, South Shetland Islands. Polar Record, 14(93): 823-827.
  - Baker, P. E., & McReath, I. (1971). 1970 volcanic eruption at Deception Island. Nature, 231(18): 5-9.
  - Baker, Peter Edward. The geology of the South Shetland Islands: V. Volcanic evolution of Deception Island. Vol. 5. British Antarctic Survey, 1975.
  - Baker, P. (1990). Deception Island. Volcanoes of the Antarctic Plate and Southern Oceans. Antarctic Research Series, 48: 316-321.
- Baker, P. E., Gass, I. G., Harris, P. G., & Le Maitre, R. W. (1964). The volcanological report of the Royal Society Expedition to Tristan da Cunha, 1962. Philosophical Transactions of the Royal Society of London. Series A, Mathematical and Physical Sciences, 256(1075): 439-575.
- Baker, P. E., Buckley, F., & Holland, J. G. (1974). Petrology and geochemistry of Easter Island. Contributions to Mineralogy and Petrology, 44(2): 85-100.
- Rea, W. J., & Baker, P. E. (1980). The geochemical characteristics and conditions of petrogenesis of the volcanic rocks of the northern Lesser Antilles—a review. Bulletin Volcanologique, 43(2): 325-336.
- Baker, P. E., González-Ferrán, O., & Rex, D. C. (1987). Geology and geochemistry of the Ojos del Salado volcanic region, Chile. Journal of the Geological Society, 144(1): 85-96.
- Baker, P. E., Gledhill, A., Harvey, P. K., & Hawkesworth, C. J. (1987). Geochemical evolution of the Juan Fernandez islands, SE Pacific. Journal of the Geological Society, 144(6): 933-944.
