= David Sayer (Kent cricketer) =

English cricketer (1936–2017)

Personal information
- Full name: David Michael Sayer
- Born: 19 September 1936; Romford, Essex
- Died: 23 January 2017 (aged 80); Kent
- Height: 6’2”
- Batting: Right-handed
- Bowling: Right-arm fast
- Role: Bowler

Domestic team information
- Years: Team
- 1955−1976: Kent
- 1958−1960: Oxford University

Career statistics
Competition	First-class	List A
Matches	204	8
Runs scored	1,252	0
Batting average	8.29	0.00
100s/50s	0/1	0/0
Top score	62	0
Balls bowled	33,482	465
Wickets	613	14
Bowling average	23.48	19.35
5 wickets in innings	19	0
10 wickets in match	2	0
Best bowling	7/37	3/24
Catches/stumpings	76/−	4/−
- Source: Cricinfo, 1 April 2025

David Michael Sayer (19 September 1936 – 23 January 2017) was an English professional cricketer. He played for Kent County Cricket Club between 1955 and 1976.

He was one of the founding members of the Professional Cricketers' Association in 1967. He died on 23 January 2017, aged 80.
