= Joe Hardstaff =

Joe Hardstaff may refer to:

- Joe Hardstaff Sr (1882–1947), Nottinghamshire and England cricketer
- Joe Hardstaff Jr (1911–1990), Nottinghamshire and England cricketer, son of Joe Hardstaff senior
- Joe Hardstaff (RAF officer) (1935–2022), English Air Commodore and first-class cricketer, son of Joe Hardstaff junior
