= Steve Wyatt =

English cricketer (born 1971)

Steve Wyatt (born 10 March 1971) was an English cricketer. He was a left-handed batsman who played for Berkshire. He was born in Newbury.

Wyatt made his debut in the Minor Counties Championship in 2001. He played in a single List A match, in the C&G Trophy, against Lincolnshire in August 2001.

From the upper-middle order, Wyatt scored 8 runs. Wyatt continued to play for Berkshire until the end of the 2002 season.
