= Michael O'Sullivan (cricketer) =

English cricketer

Michael O'Sullivan (born 16 November 1973) is a former English cricketer. He was a left-handed batsman, left-arm fast medium and slow left-arm orthodox bowler who played for Berkshire. He was born in Reading.

== Career ==
O'Sullivan, made his Second XI Championship debut for Gloucestershire in 1994, and his Berkshire debut in the 1990 Minor Counties Championship. He has also played Second XI representative cricket for Sussex and Hampshire.

O'Sullivan did not bat in his debut, but took figures of 1–12 with the ball. In his second appearance, two years later, he scored 20 runs from the lower order, though it was not enough to save Berkshire from defeat.

He was second in the Berkshire bowling averages for the 1998 season with figures of 15 wickets for 319 runs, with an average of 21.27 (bb 3–24).

His best bowling figures of 5/59 off 20 overs for Berkshire against Cornwall in July 2004 at Camborne saw Berkshire to a 96 run victory.
