= Richard Davies (cricketer) =

English cricketer

Personal information
- Full name: Richard John Davies
- Born: 11 February 1954 (age 72); Birmingham, Warwickshire, England
- Batting: Right-handed
- Bowling: Right-arm medium

Domestic team information
- Years: Team
- 1976: Warwickshire
- 1979: Berkshire

Career statistics
Competition	FC	LA
Matches	1	1
Runs scored	18	7
Batting average	9.00	7.00
100s/50s	–/–	–/–
Top score	18	7
Balls bowled	–	–
Wickets	–	–
Bowling average	–	–
5 wickets in innings	–	–
10 wickets in match	–	–
Best bowling	–	–
Catches/stumpings	1/–	1/–
- Source: Cricinfo, 21 September 2010

Richard John Davies (born 11 February 1954) is a former English cricketer. Davies was a right-handed batsman who bowled right-arm medium pace. He was born at Birmingham, Warwickshire.

Davies played a single first-class match for Warwickshire in 1976 against Oxford University, in what was his only appearance for Warwickshire.

Davies made his Minor Counties Championship debut for Berkshire in 1979 against Buckinghamshire. During 1979, he represented the county in 6 Minor Counties Championship matches, the last of which came against Wiltshire.

Additionally, he also played a single List-A match for Berkshire in the 1979 Gillette Cup against Durham at Green Lane Cricket Ground, Durham.
