= Timothy Dodd =

English cricketer

Personal information
- Full name: Timothy Patrick Johnstone Dodd
- Born: 21 April 1961 (age 65); Hammersmith, Berkshire, England
- Batting: Right-handed
- Bowling: Right-arm medium-fast

Domestic team information
- Years: Team
- 1987–1992 & 1996: Berkshire

Career statistics
Competition	LA
Matches	2
Runs scored	19
Batting average	19.00
100s/50s	–/–
Top score	15
Balls bowled	90
Wickets	2
Bowling average	23.00
5 wickets in innings	–
10 wickets in match	–
Best bowling	2/37
Catches/stumpings	–/–
- Source: Cricinfo, 8 August 2010

Timothy Patrick Johnstone Dodd (born 21 April 1961) is a former English cricketer. Dodd was a right-handed batsman who bowled right-arm medium-fast. He was born at Hammersmith, London.

Dodd made his debut for Berkshire in the 1987 Minor Counties Championship against Oxfordshire. From 1987 to 1992, he represented the county in 29 Minor Counties Championships matches. In 1996, he made his final appearance for the county against Devon in the Minor Counties Championship. He also represented Berkshire in 4 MCCA Knockout Trophy matches, the last of which came against Buckinghamshire in 1992.

Dodd also represented the county in 2 List-A matches, making his List-A debut against Yorkshire in the 1988 NatWest Trophy. He represented the county in a further List-A match against Sussex in the 1989 NatWest Trophy. In his 2 List-A matches, he scored 19 runs at a batting average of 19.00, with high score of 15. With the ball he took 2 wickets at a bowling average of 23.00, with best figures of 2/37.
