= Neil Cartmel =

English cricketer (born 1968)

Neil Cartmel (born 15 July 1968) was an English cricketer. He was a right-handed batsman and a wicket-keeper who played for Berkshire. He was born in Harrow.

Cartmel played for Essex and Derbyshire's Second XI teams prior to entering Minor counties cricket. Cartmel played his first Minor Counties Championship game in the 1991 season and picked up his first List A appearance a year later, in a NatWest Trophy match against Derbyshire. Cartmel scored 27 runs in this match, his sole contribution with the bat in List A cricket.

Although he played less frequently in 1993, he picked up his second and final List A appearance during the following season, against Kent, though he did not bat or bowl during this match. He played Second XI cricket for Middlesex in 1996.
