= Gerry Hardstaff =

English cricketer

Personal information
- Full name: Gerald Charles Hardstaff
- Born: 4 February 1940; Crewe, Cheshire, England
- Died: 28 March 2015 (aged 75); Winsford, Cheshire, England
- Batting: Right-handed
- Bowling: Right-arm medium

Domestic team information
- Years: Team
- 1972: Minor Counties North
- 1960–1978: Cheshire

Career statistics
Competition	List A
Matches	6
Runs scored	64
Batting average	10.66
100s/50s	–/–
Top score	45
Balls bowled	304
Wickets	9
Bowling average	19.44
5 wickets in innings	–
10 wickets in match	–
Best bowling	4/31
Catches/stumpings	2/–
- Source: Cricinfo, 4 April 2011

Gerald 'Gerry' Charles Hardstaff (4 February 1940 – 28 March 2015) was an English cricketer. Hardstaff was a right-handed batsman who bowled right-arm medium pace. He was born at Crewe, Cheshire.

Hardstaff made his debut for Cheshire in the 1960 Minor Counties Championship against the Warwickshire Second XI. Fisher played Minor counties cricket for Cheshire from 1960 to 1978, including 89 Minor Counties Championship matches In 1964, he made his List A debut against Surrey in the 1964 Gillette Cup. He played three further List A matches for Cheshire, the last of which came against Northamptonshire in the 1968 Gillette Cup. In his four List A matches for Cheshire, he scored 45 runs at a batting average of 11.25, with a high score of 45. With the ball he took 5 wickets at a bowling average of 24.40, with best figures of 4/31.

Hardstaff also played two List A matches for Minor Counties North in the 1972 Benson & Hedges Cup against Nottinghamshire and Lancashire. In his two matches for the team he scored 19 runs and took 4 wickets at an average of 13.25, with best figures of 3/39.

He died on 28 March 2015 at St Luke's Hospice in Winsford, Cheshire, following a battle with cancer.
