= Mark Simmons (cricketer) =

English cricketer

Personal information
- Full name: Mark Lawrence Simmons
- Born: 2 June 1955 (age 71); Windsor, Berkshire, England
- Batting: Left-handed
- Bowling: Slow left-arm orthodox

Domestic team information
- Years: Team
- 1976–1996: Berkshire

Career statistics
Competition	List A
Matches	12
Runs scored	154
Batting average	15.40
100s/50s	0/0
Top score	34
Balls bowled	60
Wickets	2
Bowling average	21.50
5 wickets in innings	0
10 wickets in match	0
Best bowling	2/43
Catches/stumpings	2/–
- Source: Cricinfo, 21 September 2010

Mark Lawrence Simmons (born 2 June 1955) is a former English cricketer. Simmons was a left-handed batsman who bowled slow left-arm orthodox. He was born at Windsor, Berkshire.

Simmons made his Minor Counties Championship debut for Berkshire in 1976 against Oxfordshire. From 1976 to 1996, he represented the county in 148 Minor Counties Championship matches, the last of which came in the 1996 Championship when Berkshire played Cornwall. Simmons also played in the MCCA Knockout Trophy for Berkshire. His debut in that competition came in 1983 when Berkshire played Norfolk.

From 1983 to 1995, he represented the county in 21 Trophy matches, the last of which occurred when Berkshire played Cambridgeshire in the 1995 MCCA Knockout Trophy. Simmons captained Berkshire from 1987 to 1995.

He also played List-A matches for Berkshire. His List-A debut for the county came against Durham in the 1979 Gillette Cup. From 1979 to 1995, he represented the county in 12 matches, with his final List-A match coming when Berkshire played Surrey in the 1995 NatWest Trophy at The Oval, London. In his 12 matches, he scored 154 runs at a batting average of 15.40, with a high score of 34. With the ball he took 2 wickets at a bowling average of 21.50, with best figures of 2/43.

He has taught at Leighton Park School since 1980 and is currently Assistant Head, Senior Master and Head of Year 9 there.
