= Eddison Roberts =

English cricketer (born 1959)

Personal information
- Full name: Theophile Eddison Roberts
- Born: 23 January 1959 (age 67); Antigua
- Batting: Right-handed
- Bowling: Right-arm fast-medium

Domestic team information
- Years: Team
- 1984-1985: Berkshire

Career statistics
Competition	LA
Matches	2
Runs scored	10
Batting average	5.00
100s/50s	–/–
Top score	7
Balls bowled	138
Wickets	2
Bowling average	56.00
5 wickets in innings	–
10 wickets in match	–
Best bowling	2/42
Catches/stumpings	–/–
- Source: Cricinfo, 21 September 2010

Theophile Eddison Roberts (born 23 January 1959) is an Antiguan born former English cricketer. Roberts was a right-handed batsman who bowled right-arm fast-medium.

Roberts made his Minor Counties Championship debut for Berkshire in 1984 against Buckinghamshire. From 1984 to 1985, he represented the county in 12 Minor Counties Championship matches, the last of which came in the 1985 Championship when Berkshire played Buckinghamshire. Roberts also played in the MCCA Knockout Trophy for Berkshire. His debut in that competition came in 1984 when Berkshire played Buckinghamshire. From 1984 to 1985, he represented the county in 4 Trophy matches, the last of which came when Berkshire played Shropshire in the 1985 MCCA Knockout Trophy.

Additionally, he also played 2 List-A matches for Berkshire. His List-A debut for the county came against Kent in the 1984 NatWest Trophy. The following season he played his second and final List-A match, when Berkshire played Hampshire in the 1985 NatWest Trophy at the County Ground, Southampton. In his 2 matches, he took 2 wickets at a bowling average of 56.00, with best figures of 2/42.
