= Joe Mence =

English cricketer

Joseph Alan Mence (21 April 1921 – 12 May 2014) was an English cricketer who played for Berkshire.

Having represented Berkshire in the Minor Counties Championship since 1946, Mence received his county cap in 1947. He was the team's captain in the 1954 and 1955 seasons.

Mence's only List A cricket appearance came in his final year in the team, in the 1965 Gillette Cup. Batting in the upper-middle order, he scored 22 runs. His son Michael also represented Berkshire, including playing alongside his father during the 1961 season; Michael also played first-class cricket for Warwickshire and Gloucestershire.
