= Alan Bell (cricketer) =

English cricketer

T Alan Bell (13 April 1929 – 27 August 2011) was an English cricketer who played for Hertfordshire County Cricket Club. He represented Hertfordshire in the Minor Counties Championship between 1957 and 1967 and made a single List A appearance for the side, in the 1966 Gillette Cup.

Opening the batting, Bell scored 105 runs in the only innings in which he batted in List A cricket – though this century was not enough to save the team from defeat in the competition.
