= John Drewett =

English cricketer (1932–2022)

John Stephen Drewett (23 October 1932 – 3 April 2022) was an English cricketer. He was a wicket-keeper who played for Berkshire.

Drewett was born in Windsor, Berkshire on 23 October 1932. He represented the Berkshire team in the Minor Counties Championship between 1961 and 1965, made his only List A appearance in his final year at the club, in the 1965 Gillette Cup against Somerset. From the upper-middle order, Drewett scored a single run. Drewett died in Herefordshire on 3 April 2022, at the age of 89.
