= Anthony Denness =

English cricketer

Personal information
- Full name: Anthony Charles Denness
- Born: 23 September 1936; Hampton, Middlesex, England
- Died: 15 May 2008 (aged 71); Grainville, Eure, France
- Batting: Right-handed
- Bowling: Right-arm fast-medium

Domestic team information
- Years: Team
- 1961–1971: Berkshire

Career statistics
Competition	LA
Matches	3
Runs scored	35
Batting average	17.50
100s/50s	–/ –
Top score	18
Balls bowled	216
Wickets	7
Bowling average	15.28
5 wickets in innings	–
10 wickets in match	–
Best bowling	4/56
Catches/stumpings	1/ –
- Source: Cricinfo, 31 May 2010

Anthony Charles Denness (23 September 1936 – 15 May 2008) was an English cricketer. Denness was a right-handed batsman who bowled right-arm fast-medium.

In 1961, Denness made his debut for Berkshire in the 1961 Minor Counties Championship against Oxfordshire. From 1961 to 1971, Denness played 65 Minor County matches for Dorset, with his final match for the county coming against Devon in the 1971 Minor Counties Championship.

Denness made his List-A debut for Berkshire against Somerset in the 1st round of the 1965 Gillette Cup. Denness played 2 further one-day matches for the county, against Hertfordshire in the 1st round of the 1966 Gillette Cup and Gloucestershire in the 2nd round of the same tournament. During the match against Gloucestershire, he took his career best one-day figures of 4/56.

In his 3 List-A matches for the county he scored 35 runs at a batting average of 17.50 and took 7 wickets at a bowling average of 15.28.
