= David van der Knaap =

South African cricketer (born 1948)

David Saunders van der Knaap (born 7 September 1948) is a former South African cricketer active from 1967 to 1979 who played for Lancashire and Transvaal. He was born in Johannesburg. He appeared in 43 first-class matches as a righthanded batsman who bowled right arm off break. He scored 289 runs with a highest score of 44 and held 39 catches. He took 121 wickets with a best analysis of six for 61.
