= Michael Mence =

English cricketer (1944–2014)

Personal information
- Full name: Michael David Mence
- Born: 13 April 1944; Newbury, Berkshire, England
- Died: 15 May 2014 (aged 70); Newport, Isle of Wight, England
- Batting: Left-handed
- Bowling: Right-arm medium
- Relatives: Joe Mence (father)

Domestic team information
- Years: Team
- 1968–1982: Berkshire
- 1973–1975: Minor Counties South
- 1966–1967: Gloucestershire
- 1966: Marylebone Cricket Club
- 1962–1965: Warwickshire
- 1961: Berkshire

Career statistics
Competition	FC	LA
Matches	54	9
Runs scored	949	149
Batting average	15.06	18.62
100s/50s	–/4	–/1
Top score	78	50
Balls bowled	6,130	427
Wickets	86	–
Bowling average	35.46	–
5 wickets in innings	2	–
10 wickets in match	–	–
Best bowling	5/26	–
Catches/stumpings	23/–	–/–
- Source: Cricinfo, 2 October 2010

Michael David Mence (13 April 1944 – 15 May 2014) was an English cricketer. Mence was a left-handed batsman who bowled right-arm medium pace. He was born at Newbury, Berkshire.

A highly regarded schoolboy cricketer at Bradfield College, Mence made his debut for Berkshire in the Minor Counties Championship in 1961 against Devon. During the season he played all 10 Championship matches for the county. In 1962 he was selected for the Public Schools XI at Lords, taking 8 for 34 against the Combined Services. Writing in Wisden, E.M. Wellings said, "For a schoolboy he was an all-rounder quite out of the ordinary, as were his school figures – 846 runs, average 70.5, and 84 wickets, average 10.62, both being records for the School. Of his three centuries one was hit before lunch."

He was signed by Warwickshire and made his first-class debut in the 1962 County Championship against Middlesex. From 1962 to 1965, he represented Warwickshire in 31 first-class matches, the last of which came against Lancashire. In his 31 first-class matches for Warwickshire he scored 467 runs at a batting average of 13.34. With the ball he took 61 wickets for the county at a bowling average of 32.50, with best figures of 5 for 26 against Derbyshire in 1964. He also played a single List-A match for the county against Northamptonshire in the 1963 Gillette Cup.

In 1966, he appeared for the Marylebone Cricket Club against Surrey at Lord's, having joined Gloucestershire. He made his first-class debut for the county against Hampshire. In 1966 and 1967, he represented the county in 22 first-class matches, the last of which came against Middlesex. In his 22 first-class matches for the county, he scored 482 runs at an average of 17.21, making his career-high score of 78 against Sussex in 1967. With the ball he took 25 wickets at a bowling average of 42.68, with best figures of 4 for 27. He resigned from the county staff after the 1968 season, which brought an end to his first-class career. In his 54 first-class matches he had scored 949 runs at an average of 15.06, with four half centuries and a highest score of 78. With the ball he had taken 86 wickets at an average of 35.46, with two five-wicket hauls and best figures of 5 for 26.

In 1968, he rejoined Berkshire, where between 1968 and 1982, he represented the county in 49 matches, the last of which came against Oxfordshire in 1982. He also represented Berkshire in List-A cricket during this period. His debut List-A match for the county came against Hertfordshire in the 1976 Gillette Cup, with his second and final List-A appearance for the county coming against Durham in the 1979 Gillette Cup. Mence captained Berkshire from 1976 to 1978. Mence also represented Minor Counties South in six List-A matches in the Benson and Hedges Cup from 1973 to 1975.

In the 1976–77 season, Mence was a member of the MCC team that was the first international cricket team to tour Bangladesh.

== Family ==
His father Joe also played Minor counties cricket for Berkshire, including playing alongside his son in the 1961 season. He also played a single List-A match for Berkshire, as well as captaining the county from 1954 to 1955.
