= Church Road Cricket Ground =

Cricket ground in Earley, Berkshire, England

Church Road
- Interactive map of Church Road

Ground information
- Location: Earley, Berkshire
- Country: England
- Coordinates: 51.4474°N 0.9260°W
- Establishment: c. 1931

Team information
Berkshire	(1948–1983)
- As of 26 July 2010; Source: Ground profile

Church Road was a cricket ground located along Church Road in Earley, Berkshire, England. The ground was bordered to the east by woodland and to the north, south and west by residential housing. It contained one pavilion, located in the north western corner of the ground.

== History ==
The ground appears on maps of Reading as early as 1931, with the first recorded match a fixture in 1936 between London Club Cricket Conference and South of England Club Cricket Conference. Berkshire are first recorded as playing there in 1938 against the touring Rajputana cricket team. During the Second World War, Reading Cricket Club played several exhibition matches against London Counties and a British Empire XI. Berkshire first played Minor Counties Championship matches at the ground in 1948, playing Hertfordshire. Starting in 1952, the ground played host to one Minor Counties Championship match annually. The ground was the host venue for Berkshire's inaugural List A match against Somerset in the 1965 Gillette Cup. It held a further List A match for Berkshire in the 1966 Gillette Cup, with Gloucestershire as the visitors. Berkshire lost both these matches.

A single first-class match was played at the ground in 1981 between a combined Minor Counties team and the touring Sri Lankans. The match ended in a draw, with Peter Johnson and Richard Lewis making half centuries for the Minor Counties, while Sidath Wettimuny and Yohan Goonasekera both passed the same landmark for the Sri Lankans. The ground hosted its third List A match two years later when Berkshire played Yorkshire in the 1983 NatWest Trophy, while two years it hosted its fourth List A match when a combined Minor Counties team played Hampshire in the 1985 Benson & Hedges Cup. Two years previous to that fixture, the ground held its forty-first and last Minor Counties Championship match when Berkshire played Cheshire.

The ground was sold for development shortly after 1985 with Reading Cricket Club having moved to Sonning Lane. The site of the ground is today occupied by residential housing including Barrington Close, named after the Reading-born cricketer Ken Barrington.

== Records ==
=== List A ===
- Highest team total: 327/7 (60 overs) by Gloucestershire v Berkshire, 1967
- Lowest team total: 128/9 (60 overs) by Berkshire v Yorkshire, 1983
- Highest individual innings: 127 by Ron Nicholls for Gloucestershire v Berkshire, 1967
- Best bowling in an innings: 5/27 by Graham Stevenson for Yorkshire v Berkshire, 1983

== See also ==
- List of cricket grounds in England and Wales
