= Sonning Lane =

Sports venue in Sonning, England

Coordinates: 51°27′56″N 0°54′41″W

- Interactive map of Sonning Lane

Ground information
- Location: Sonning, Berkshire
- Country: England

International information
- Only women's ODI: 24 July 1993: England v Ireland

Team information
Berkshire	(1988–present)
Reading Cricket Club
Reading Hockey Club
- As of 6 September 2020; Source: Ground profile

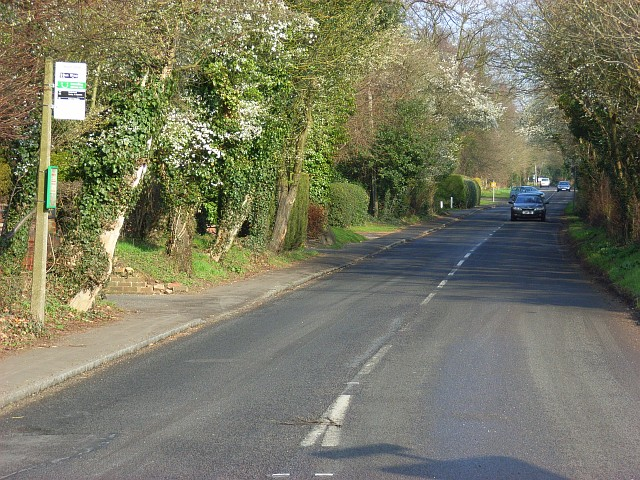
Sonning Lane between the A4 road and the village of Sonning

Sonning Lane is a cricket and hockey ground in Sonning near Reading, Berkshire, England. It is located on a road called Sonning Lane between the A4 road and the village of Sonning, hence the name.

Sonny Lane is the home of Reading Cricket Club. In 1988 Berkshire played Cornwall in the grounds' first Minor Counties Championship match, and the county side has continued to play there regularly since. This has also brought List-A cricket to the ground, starting with Berkshire's participation in the 1991 NatWest Trophy. There have been no further List-A games since 2005.

The ground is also the home of Reading Hockey Club who enter teams in both the Men's and Women's England Hockey Leagues. The ground has also hosted several men's and women's international matches.

== Cricket ==
In local domestic cricket, Sonning Lane is the home ground of Reading Cricket Club who play in the Home Counties Premier Cricket League. From 1988 to the present day, the ground has played host to 21 Minor Counties Championship matches, starting with Berkshire playing Cornwall on 31 July 1988.

The first List-A match played on the ground came in the 1991 NatWest Trophy between Berkshire and Hampshire. From 1991 to 2005, the ground hosted 6 List-A matches, with the final List-A match played at the ground between Berkshire and Gloucestershire in the 2005 Cheltenham & Gloucester Trophy.

In 1993, the ground played host to a match between the England women's cricket team and the Ireland women's cricket team in 1993 Women's Cricket World Cup.

Reading Cricket Club has seen several of its players progress into professional and international cricket. Martin Andersson is the most recent, having started as a colt at Reading, and now having signed a two-year professional contract with Middlesex County Cricket Club, which will take him to 2020. Gareth Harte, Dan Housego, and Aftab Habib have all played professional cricket having played for Reading, the later playing two tests for England.

== Hockey ==
Reading Hockey Club is also based on the ground, with matches now generally played on an artificial turf pitch. The club maintains a number of men's, women's and junior sides with both the men's and women's first teams competing in the Men's and Women's England Hockey Leagues. The hockey pitch has also hosted a number of international matches, with England men, England women and Great Britain men all having played there.
