= List of Bedfordshire County Cricket Club List A players =

This is a list of cricketers who have played for Bedfordshire County Cricket Club in List A matches. Bedfordshire, one of the Minor Counties, played 27 List A cricket matches – a one-day, limited overs form of cricket – between 1967 and 2005. After making their List A debut in the 1967 Gillette Cup the county played six matches in the competition up to 1973 and then once in 1977. Minor counties were not a regular feature of List A competitions and Bedfordshire played ten matches in the NatWest Trophy between 1982 and 2000 before playing ten matches in the Cheltenham & Gloucester Trophy between 2001 and 2005.

The knock-out nature of the Gillette Cup means that in most competitions Bedfordshire only played one match, most often against a first-class county. They won eight matches during the time they competed in List A competitions: the first win coming in their second match in 1968. On three occasions the county reached the third round of a List A competition in 1999, 2001 and 2003, beating other Minor Counties or Cricket Boards, as well as the Netherlands in 2002.

Players are listed alphabetically with the number of matches played and the calendar years in which they made their first and last appearances in List A cricket for Bedfordshire. Most players also made appearances for Bedfordshire in the Minor Counties Championship and some will have represented other teams in top-class cricket. Only their appearances for Bedfordshire are included below.

== A ==
| Name | Seasons (Note: The range of seasons the player represented Bedfordshire in List A cricket.) | Matches | Comments | Ref |
|---|---|---|---|---|
| Ranil Abeynaike | 1982 | 1 | Sri Lankan who played for Bedfordshire between 1978 and 1982. Played 14 first-class matches, including for Sri Lankan representative teams before the country had Full Member status. | |
| Richard Ashton | 1991 | 1 | Played one season for Bedfordshire, making three Minor Counties Championship appearances for the county. Played two other List A matches for Northamptonshire Cricket Board. | |
| Philip August | 1982–1985 | 2 | Played in 71 Minor Counties Championship matches for Bedfordshire between 1975 and 1986. August's father, George, had played 125 times for the county between 1935 and 1960. | |

== B ==
| Name | Seasons | Matches | Comments | Ref |
|---|---|---|---|---|
| Benjamin Banks | 1991 | 1 | Played Minor Counties cricket between 1990 and 1995. | |
| Thomas Beck | 1970 | 1 | Had previously played in seven Minor Counties Championship matches for Bedfordshire between 1965 and 1968. | |
| Peter Bichener | 1971 | 1 | Took two wickets in against Essex in the 1971 Gillette Cup. Played in 12 Minor Counties Championship matches between 1968 and 1971. | |
| Richard Blair | 1994 | 1 | Played Minor Counties cricket between 1989 and 1995. | |
| Patrick Briggs | 1970–1971 | 2 | Played first-class cricket for Cambridge University in 1963 and 1964 and Minor Counties cricket for Cheshire between 1960 and 1968, for whom he also made two List A appearances for. Played for Bedfordshire between 1969 and 1973. | |
| Tony Bristow | 2001–2002 | 3 | Australian who played for Bedfordshire for two seasons, making eight Minor Counties Championship appearances for the team. | |
| Chris Bullen | 1994–1997 | 2 | Former Surrey player who played for Bedfordshire between 1992 and 1997. Also played List A matches for Surrey Cricket Board between 1999 and 2001 and a first-class match for Minor Counties in 1994. Cousin of David Roberts who also played List A cricket for Bedfordshire. | |
| Bill Bushby | 1967–1973 | 6 | Played in Bedfordshire's first six List A matches and in 87 Minor Counties Championship matches between 1961 and 1975. | |

== C ==
| Name | Seasons | Matches | Comments | Ref |
|---|---|---|---|---|
| David Clarke | 1994–2003 | 14 | Played for Bedfordshire between 1992 and 2003, making more than 60 Minor Counties appearances for the team. | |
| Douglas Clarke | 1977 | 1 | Played for the county between 1972 and 1980. | |
| Oliver Clayson | 2000–2001 | 5 | Made more than 50 Minor Counties Championship appearances for Bedfordshire as well as playing for Cumberland. | |
| Nick Coles | 2001 | 1 | Played for Bedfordshire in 2001 and 2002, making six Minor Counties appearances for the team. | |
| Norman Cooley | 1967–1973 | 5 | Played in Bedfordshire's earliest List A matches and in 61 Minor Counties Championship matches between 1962 and 1975. | |
| Roger Cox | 1968–1973 | 5 | Played 50 Minor Counties Championship appearances for Bedfordshire between 1967 and 1975. Played one first-class match for Minor Counties. | |

== D ==
| Name | Seasons | Matches | Comments | Ref |
|---|---|---|---|---|
| Richard Dalton | 1994–1999 | 4 | Also played seven List A matches for Minor Counties in the 1997 and 1998 Benson & Hedges Cup. | |
| David Daniels | 1977–1982 | 2 | Had previously played first-class cricket for Cambridge University and List A matches for Dorset and for Minor Counties representative teams. Played in 160 Minor Counties Championship matches. | |
| Dean Dass | 2001 | 1 | Wicket-keeper. Played in one match against Derbyshire Cricket Board in the first round of the 2002 Cheltenham & Gloucester Trophy in August 2001. Made three Minor Counties Championship appearances the same season. | |
| Simon Davis | 1991 | 1 | Played Minor Counties matches for the county between 1987 and 1996. | |
| Ian Davison | 1967–1968 | 3 | Played in Bedfordshire's first three List A matches, having previously had a first-class career with Nottinghamshire, playing in 178 first-class matches between 1959 and 1966. | |
| Geoffrey Dawson | 1967 | 1 | Played for the county between 1957 and 1969, making 50 Minor Counties Championship appearances for the team. | |
| Alan Dean | 1991 | 1 | Played Minor Counties cricket for the county between 1987 and 1991. | |
| Robert Demming | 1973–1977 | 2 | Made 38 Minor Counties appearances for the county between 1972 and 1977. | |
| Rodney Dethridge | 1982 | 1 | Played 11 Minor Counties Championship matches for the team in 1982 and 1983 as well as twice for the Kent Second XI. | |
| Tony Durley | 1967–1973 | 6 | Played in all six of Bedfordshire's first List A matches and in 101 Minor Counties Championship matches for the team between 1960 and 1976. Had a ref first-class career at Essex County Cricket Club in the late 1950s. | |

== F ==
| Name | Seasons | Matches | Comments | Ref |
|---|---|---|---|---|
| Ian Fantham | 1998–2000 | 3 | Played for the county between 1996 and 2000, having previously played Minor Counties cricket for Hertfordshire. | |
| Neil Folland | 1991 | 1 | Played for Bedfordshire between 1990 and 1994, having previously played for Devon, including in one other List A match. | |

== G ==
| Name | Seasons | Matches | Comments | Ref |
|---|---|---|---|---|
| Michael Gear | 1970–1982 | 5 | Played in over 100 Minor Counties Championship matches between 1970 and 1988, including 9 for Buckinghamshire who he also made a single List A appearance for in 1984. Played three List A matches for Minor Counties South in the 1973 Benson & Hedges Cup. | |
| Kevin Gentle | 1985 | 1 | Played more than 80 times for the county in Minor Counties matches. | |
| Mark Gouldstone | 1991 | 1 | Played for the county between 1989 and 1992 after having played first-class cricket for Northants from 1986 to 1988. Also played List A and Minor Counties cricket for Hertfordshire and Lincolnshire. | |
| Jon Green | 2002 | 2 | Played in 13 matches for Bedfordshire in a two-season career. | |

== H ==
| Name | Seasons | Matches | Comments | Ref |
|---|---|---|---|---|
| Paul Harris | 1977 | 1 | Played Minor Counties cricket between 1976 and 1980, making 30 Minor Counties Championship appearances for the team. | |
| David Hoare | 1967–1970 | 4 | Played in Bedfordshire's first four List A matches and made 81 Minor Counties Championship appearances between 1955 and 1971. Father of Philip Hoare. | |
| Philip Hoare | 1985–1999 | 7 | Made over 100 Minor Counties Championship appearances for the team. Son of David Hoare. | |
| John Hughes | 1998–2001 | 10 | Had played for Northants between 1990 and 1997 as well as making a List A appearance for Combined Universities in 1994. | |

== I ==
| Name | Seasons | Matches | Comments | Ref |
|---|---|---|---|---|
| Kevin Innes | 2005 | 1 | Played only one match for Bedfordshire, the county's final List A fixture against Sussex in the 2005 Cheltenham & Gloucester Trophy. Had previously played first-class cricket for Northants and Sussex. | |

== J ==
| Name | Seasons | Matches | Comments | Ref |
|---|---|---|---|---|
| Graham Jarrett | 1967–1977 | 7 | Played in over 100 Minor Counties Championship matches for Bedfordshire between 1954 and 1977 as well as in three first-class matches for Minor Counties and | |
| Keith Jones | 1977–1982 | 2 | Played in more than 100 Minor Counties Championship matches for Bedfordshire between 1975 and 1989 following a first-class career with Middlesex. | |
| Tony Jorden | 1977 | 1 | Played for Bedfordshire between 1975 and 1977 following a first-class career with Essex from 1966 to 1970 and a rugby union career which saw him capped seven times by England between 1970 and 1975. | |

== K ==
| Name | Seasons | Matches | Comments | Ref |
|---|---|---|---|---|
| James Knott | 2001–2005 | 9 | Had previously played first-class cricket for Surrey and had one season with Cambridgeshire before joining Bedfordshire. Played more than 75 Minor Counties matches for the county. | |

== L ==
| Name | Seasons | Matches | Comments | Ref |
|---|---|---|---|---|
| Derek Lane | 2003 | 1 | Had previously made two List A appearances for Herefordshire in 1999. | |
| Wayne Larkins | 1997–2000 | 6 | Former England international who played in 45 Minor Counties Championship matches for his native Bedfordshire between 1995 and 2000 after his first-class career with Northants and Durham was over. Played a further three List A matches in 2001 for Huntingdonshire. | |
| Steven Lines | 1982–1985 | 2 | Played more than 50 times for Bedfordshire in the Minor Counties Championship between 1980 and 1990 as well as for Northants Second XI. Made a single first-class appearance for Northants in 1983. | |

== M ==
| Name | Seasons | Matches | Comments | Ref |
|---|---|---|---|---|
| Timothy Machin | 1977 | 1 | Played for Bedfordshire between 1973 and 1978, making 47 Minor Counties Championship appearances for the team. | |
| Brian Marvin | 1985 | 1 | Made 20 Minor Counties Championship appearances between 1984 and 1994, having previously played once for Buckinghamshire in the same competition. | |
| David Mercer | 1998–2001 | 10 | Had previously played List A and Minor Counties matches for Wiltshire and Berkshire. Played more than 200 Minor Counties matches in total in a career which lasted from 1983 to 2005. | |
| Geoff Millman | 1967–1968 | 3 | Former England international who played almost 300 first-class matches, including in six Test matches. Began his career with Bedfordshire and returned to the county after retiring from the first-class game, playing in the county's first three List A matches. | |
| Michael Morgan | 1977–1985 | 3 | Played in over 100 Minor Counties matches for Bedfordshire. | |
| Trevor Morley | 1970–1973 | 3 | Played Minor Counties cricket for Bedfordshire between 1961 and 1975, having previously played for Hertfordshire. Made more than 150 Minor Counties Championship appearances in a career which lasted from 1953 to 1975. | |
| Simon Murray | 2000 | 1 | Played a total of seven matches for Bedfordshire, six in the Minor Counties Championship between 1996 and 1999. | |

== P ==
| Name | Seasons | Matches | Comments | Ref |
|---|---|---|---|---|
| Robert Pack | 2002 | 2 | Also played List A matches for Northamptonshire Cricket Board, having played some matches for Northants Second XI in the early 1990s. | |
| Jeremy Page | 2000 | 1 | Played a total of five matches for the county, including four in the Minor Counties Championship between 1995 and 2003. | |
| Andrew Patterson | 2003 | 1 | Made nine Minor Counties Championship appearances for Bedfordshire between 2002 and 2004, having previously played first-class cricket for Ireland and Sussex. Brother of Mark Patterson. | |
| Mark Patterson | 2002–2005 | 3 | Played for Bedfordshire between 2002 and 2005, making a total of 22 Minor Counties Championship appearances. Had previously played briefly for Surrey and made other List A appearances for Ireland in ICC Trophy matches. Brother of Andrew Patterson. | |
| Roger Pearman | 1973 | 1 | Played for Bedfordshire in 1973 and 1974 before moving to play for Cheshire. Had previously played first-class cricket for Middlesex between 1962 and 1964. Played other List A matches for both Minor Counties South and Minor Counties North in the Benson & Hedges Cup from 1973 to 1975. | |
| Andrew Pearson | 1982–1985 | 2 | Played Minor Counties cricket for Bedfordshire between 1981 and 1987 having played for Northants Second XI between 1974 and 1980. | |
| Ian Peck | 1977–1985 | 2 | Played Minor Counties Cricket for Bedfordshire between 1976 and 1985. Also played first-class cricket for Cambridge University and, briefly, for Northants. Played a further seven List A matches for the Combined Universities team. | |
| Lee Pollard | 2003 | 2 | Played twice in List A matches in 2003, once in Bedfordshire's third round match in the 2003 Cheltenham & Gloucester Trophy and once in the county's first round match in the following year's competition. Had previously played three List A matches for Leicestershire Cricket Board and Second XI cricket for Leicestershire. | |
| Christopher Proudman | 1985 | 1 | Played Minor Counties cricket for Bedfordshire between 1984 and 1987. | |

== R ==
| Name | Seasons | Matches | Comments | Ref |
|---|---|---|---|---|
| Shaun Rashid | 2001–2005 | 7 | Also played Minor Counties cricket for Staffordshire and Lancashire Cricket Board. | |
| Andrew Roberts | 1997–2005 | 16 | Holds the record for the most List A appearances for Bedfordshire. Played first-class cricket for Northants between 1989 and 1996 and made over 130 Minor Counties appearances for Bedfordshire as well as playing two List A matches for a Minor Counties team in the 1998 Benson & Hedges Cup. Brother of Timothy Roberts | |
| David Roberts | 2002 | 2 | Played for Bedfordshire for only one season, having played first-class cricket for Northants between 1996 and 1999 and playing two List A matches for Northamptonshire Cricket Board in 2001. Moved to his native Cornwall from 2003, making a further List A appearance for that county. Roberts' cousin, Chris Bullen, also played List A cricket for Bedfordshire. | |
| Timothy Roberts | 2003 | 1 | Played in four Minor Counties Championship matches for Bedfordshire in 2000 before a first-class cricket career with Lancashire and Northants between 2000 and 2005. Made his only List A appearance for Bedfordshire between being released by Lancashire and joining Northants. Brother of Andrew Roberts. | |
| Barry Robinson | 1968 | 2 | Played in both of the county's matches in the 1968 Gillette Cup, including their first List A victory against Dorset in the first round. Played 87 times for the county in the Minor Counties Championship between 1957 and 1973. | |
| Jonathan Robinson | 1994 | 1 | Played for Bedfordshire for two seasons, having had a first-class career with Surrey from 1988 to 1992. | |
| Trevor Rosier | 1968–1973 | 3 | Played Minor Counties cricket for Bedfordshire between 1968 and 1973 and appeared in three List A matches, including the county's first victory in List A matches against Dorset in 1968 in which he took three wickets. Also played twice for Minor Counties South in the 1973 Benson & Hedges Cup. | |

== S ==
| Name | Seasons | Matches | Comments | Ref |
|---|---|---|---|---|
| Gary Sandford | 1991–2000 | 8 | Played for Bedfordshire between 1990 and 2000, making 66 Minor Counties Championship appearances, before moving to play for Huntingdonshire where he made another four List A appearances in 2000 and 2001. | |
| Adrian Shankar | 2005 | 1 | Played for Bedfordshire between 2000 and 2006 as well as for Cambridge University and Cambridge UCCE and, briefly in 2011 for Worcestershire, making a total of 11 first-class and two List A appearances. | |
| Zaheer Sher | 1997–1999 | 5 | Also played in List A competitions for Buckinghamshire and Minor Counties. | |
| Jack Smith | 1967–1973 | 6 | Made six List A appearances for Bedfordshire as well as four for Minor Counties South in the 1973 Benson & Hedges Cup and a single first-class appearance for Minor Counties South against the touring South Africans in 1965. Played in 146 Minor Counties Championship matches for Bedfordshire between 1959 and 1975. | |
| William Sneath | 1999–2003 | 10 | Played more than 50 matches for Bedfordshire in Minor Counties competitions as well as making Second XI Championship appearances for Northants in 2000. | |
| Keith Standring | 1994 | 1 | Played Minor County cricket between 1984 and 1995. | |
| Neil Stanley | 1994–2003 | 13 | Had played for Northants between 1988 and 1993 and made 40 appearances for Bedfordshire in the Minor Counties Championship between 1987 and 2002. | |
| James Steadman | 2002–2003 | 4 | Played for the county between 2001 and 2003, making five appearances in Minor Counties matches as well as his four in List A matches. | |
| Malcolm Stedman | 1982 | 1 | Played 40 times for the county in the Minor Counties Championship between 1974 and 1986. | |
| Marcus Steed | 2003–2005 | 3 | Played more than 50 Minor Counties matched for Bedfordshire between 2003 and 2009. Had previously made four List A appearances for Northamptonshire Cricket Board between 2001 and 2002. | |
| David Steele | 1985 | 1 | Former England international who played one season for Bedfordshire after his retirement from first-class cricket. Made 500 first-class and 260 List A appearances in his career. | |
| Raymond Swann | 1991 | 1 | Swann had also made a List A appearance for Northumberland in 1971 and went on to make another for Northamptonshire Cricket Board in 1999. Having played Minor Counties cricket for Northumberland between 1969 and 1972, he played 43 Minor Counties Championship matches for Bedfordshire between 1989 and 1995 and made occasional appearances for Northants Second XI in the Second XI Championship between 1973 and 1981. Both of his sons, Alec and Graeme Swann, played for Bedfordshire before joining first-class counties. Graeme went on to play for the England cricket team. | |

== T ==
| Name | Seasons | Matches | Comments | Ref |
|---|---|---|---|---|
| Peter Taylor | 1967 | 1 | Played in Bedfordshire's first List A match, a defeat by Northants in the 1967 Gillette Cup. Played in 50 Minor Counties Championship matches between 1962 and 1982 as well as for Northants Second XI in the Second XI Championship in the early 1960s. | |
| Peter Thomas | 1991–1994 | 2 | Played in two List A matches as well as 15 Minor Counties Championship matches and six MCCA Knockout Trophy matches between 1990 and 1995. | |
| Andrew Trott | 1997–2005 | 11 | Played more than 80 Minor Counties matches for the county between 1995 and 2008. | |

== W ==
| Name | Seasons | Matches | Comments | Ref |
|---|---|---|---|---|
| John Wake | 1985–1991 | 2 | Played in 69 Minor Counties Championship matches for Bedfordshire between 1983 and 1992. Wake's son, Cameron also played for the county. | |
| Alex Wakely | 2005 | 1 | Played in Bedfordshire's final List A match in the 2005 Cheltenham & Gloucester Trophy against Sussex. Joined Northants in 2007 and has played over 140 first-class matches for the county. | |
| Jonathan Walford | 2005 | 1 | Played in Bedfordshire's final List A match in the 2005 Cheltenham & Gloucester Trophy against Sussex. Played in 19 Minor Counties Championship matches for Bedfordshire between 2004 and 2009. | |
| Stephen Watts | 2003–2005 | 2 | Played in Bedfordshire's final two List A matches and made 22 Minor Counties Championship appearances between 2001 and 2006. | |
| Peter Webley | 1971 | 1 | Opened the batting against Essex in the 1971 Gillette Cup. Played 36 Minor Counties Championship matches for the county between 1967 and 1975. | |
| Bryn West | 2000 | 1 | Played in Bedfordshire's loss to Northumberland in 2000 as well as in one Minor Counties Championship match in 1998. | |
| Matthew White | 1994–1998 | 3 | Played in three List A matches as well as 45 Minor Counties Championship matches for Bedfordshire between 1989 and 1998. Son of Richard White | |
| Richard White | 1967 | 1 | Played in the county's loss to Northants as well as in 20 Minor Counties Championship matches between 1959 and 1975. Father of Matthew White | |
| Christopher Williams | 1982 | 1 | Australian who played in a total of four matches for Bedfordshire, two in the Minor Counties Championship, a friendly against Norfolk and the county's match in the NatWest Trophy against Somerset – all in 1982. | |
| Malcolm Wynn | 1970 | 1 | Played for the county against Buckinghamshire in the 1970 Gillette Cup as well as in 13 Minor Counties matches between 1968 and 1970. | |

== Y ==
| Name | Seasons | Matches | Comments | Ref |
|---|---|---|---|---|
| Barry Young | 1997 | 1 | Top scored with 30 runs as Bedfordshire lost to Glamorgan. Made five Minor Counties Championship appearances for the team between 1996 and 1998. | |
| Shaun Young | 2001–2003 | 7 | Australian who played in one Test match in 1997 and in 138 first-class matches. Did not play for Bedfordshire in any other matches. | |
