= List of Minor Counties South List A players =

Minor Counties South played in List A cricket matches between 1972 and 1979. This is a list of the players who appeared in those matches.

- Andrew Barker (1972–1973): AH Barker
- Terry Barwell (1972): TI Barwell
- Raymond Bond (1973–1974): RE Bond
- Alan Burridge (1975): AJ Burridge
- Brian Collins (1973–1979): BG Collins
- Francis Collyer (1972–1979): FE Collyer
- Richard Cooper (1975): RC Cooper
- David Daniels (1972): DM Daniels
- Micky Dunn (1973): MT Dunn
- Malcolm Dunstan (1979): MST Dunstan
- Keith Edwards (1973–1974): JKS Edwards
- Alan Garofall (1972–1974): AR Garofall
- Michael Gear (1973): ME Gear
- Peter Gooch (1979): PA Gooch
- Richard Gulliver (1979): RJ Gulliver
- Richard Hayward (1979): RE Hayward
- Bob Herman (1979): RS Herman
- Basil Hollington (1972–1974): HB Hollington
- Geoff Hunter (1972): CMG Hunter
- Ray Hutchison (1974–1975): RW Hutchison
- Brian Jeffries (1974–1975): BR Jeffries
- Robin Johns (1979): RL Johns
- David Johnston (1975): D Johnston
- Gwynne Jones (1975): GA Jones
- Keith Jones (1975): KV Jones
- David Laitt (1972–1973): DJ Laitt
- Richard Lewis (1979): RV Lewis
- David Light (1974): DG Light
- David Mackintosh (1973): DS Mackintosh
- Barrie Matthews (1974): BL Matthews
- Michael Mence (1973–1975): MD Mence
- James Merryweather (1972): JH Merryweather
- Timothy Murrills (1979): TJ Murrills
- Mike Nurton (1974–1979): MD Nurton
- Wayne Osman (1979): WM Osman
- David Ottley (1979): DG Ottley
- Christopher Payne (1975): CJ Payne
- Roger Pearman (1973): R Pearman
- Brian Poll (1972): BW Poll
- Bob Pomphrey (1979): RH Pomphrey
- Giles Ridley (1972): GNS Ridley
- Brian Roe (1973): B Roe
- Trevor Rosier (1973): TK Rosier
- Jack Smith (1973): J Smith
- Bill Smith (1972): WA Smith
- Jim Standen (1972): JA Standen
- Colin Tibbett (1979): CJ Tibbett
- Ray Tolchard (1979): RC Tolchard
- John Turner (1972–1975): JB Turner
- Michael Wagstaffe (1974): MC Wagstaffe
- Tony Warrington (1973–1975): AG Warrington
- Brian White (1972–1974): BH White
- Doug Yeabsley (1972–1979): DI Yeabsley
