= Peter Taylor =

Peter Taylor may refer to:

== Arts ==
- Peter Taylor (writer) (1917–1994), American author, winner of the Pulitzer Prize for Fiction
- Peter Taylor (film editor) (1922–1997), English film editor, winner of an Academy Award for Film Editing

== Politics and government ==
- Peter Taylor (paymaster) (1714–1777), British politician, MP for Wells and MP for Portsmouth
- Peter Alfred Taylor (1819–1891), British politician and radical
- Peter Taylor, Baron Taylor of Gosforth (1930–1997), Lord Chief Justice of England and Wales, 1992–1997
- Peter Taylor alias Perce, member of parliament (MP) for Marlborough in 1554
- Peter Taylor (mayor) (born 1980), mayor of Watford

== Sport ==
- Pete Taylor (sportscaster) (1945–2003), American sports broadcaster
- Pete Taylor (baseball) (1927–2003), American baseball pitcher
- Peter Taylor (Australian footballer) (born 1954), Australian rules footballer
- Peter Taylor (Australian cricketer) (born 1956), Australian cricketer
- Peter Taylor (English cricketer) (born 1942), former cricketer for Bedfordshire
- Peter Taylor (South African cricketer) (born 1934), South African cricketer
- Peter Taylor (footballer, born 1928) (1928–1990), English football goalkeeper and manager, associated with Brian Clough
- Peter Taylor (footballer, born 1953) (born 1953), English football manager and former player
- Peter Taylor (rower) (born 1984), New Zealand Olympic rower
- Pete Taylor (boxing coach), former boxer turned boxing coach
- Peter Taylor (rugby league) (born 1985), Australian rugby league player

== Other fields ==
- Peter Taylor (botanist) (1926–2011), British botanist at Royal Botanic Gardens, Kew
- Peter Taylor (journalist) (born 1942), British journalist and author of non-fiction books, especially about Northern Ireland and Al-Qaeda
- Peter J. Taylor (born 1944), British geographer
- Peter Taylor (environmentalist) (born 1948), British environmentalist
- Peter Taylor (priest) (born 1944), archdeacon of Harlow

== Characters ==
- Peter Taylor (General Hospital), a character from the soap opera General Hospital
