= Barry Robinson =

Barry Robinson may refer to:

- Barry Robinson (cricketer) (born 1932), English cricketer
- Barry Robinson (sprinter) (born 1937), New Zealand athlete and architect
- Barry Robinson (hurdler) (born 1963), American hurdler, 1985 indoor All-American for the Penn State Nittany Lions track and field team
- Barry Robinson (American Dad!), a character in American Dad!
