= Stephen Watt =

Stephen Watt may refer to:

- Stephen Watt (politician) (born 1956), American politician
- Stephen Huntley Watt (born 1984), computer consultant and ex-hacker
- Stephen M. Watt, computer scientist and mathematician
- Stephen Watt (curler), English curler

== See also ==
- Stephen Watts (disambiguation)
