= Proudman =

Proudman is an English surname. Notable people with the name include:

- Charlotte Proudman (born 1988), British barrister and writer
- Christopher Proudman (born 1952), English cricketer
- Joseph Proudman (1888–1975), British mathematician and oceanographer
- Maureen Patey (Eyre) Proudman (1906–1989), English designer and painter
- Sonia Proudman (1949–2023), judge of the High Court of England and Wales
