= Thomas Beck =

Thomas Beck may refer to:

- Thomas Beck (actor) (1909–1995), American film and stage actor
- Thomas Beck (politician) (1819–?), politician in the Texas House of Representatives
- Thomas Alcock Beck (1795–1846), English historian
- Thomas Snow Beck (1814–1877), British doctor
- Thomas Beck (footballer) (born 1981), Liechtenstein football striker
- Thomas Beck (cricketer) (1936–2008), English cricketer
- Thomas Beck (engineer) (1900–1948), New Zealand irrigation engineer

== See also ==
- Thomas Bek (disambiguation)
- Tom Beck (disambiguation)
