= David Light =

David Light may refer to:

- David Light (boxer) (born 1991), New Zealand professional boxer
- David Light (cricketer) (born 1944), English former cricketer
