= Tony Warrington =

English cricketer

Personal information
- Full name: Anthony George Warrington
- Born: 28 March 1947 (age 79); Ipswich, Suffolk, England
- Batting: Right-handed

Domestic team information
- Years: Team
- 1973–1975: Minor Counties South
- 1973–1974: Minor Counties
- 1966–1989: Suffolk

Career statistics
Competition	First-class	List A
Matches	2	12
Runs scored	152	147
Batting average	38.00	12.25
100s/50s	–/1	–/–
Top score	92	44
Balls bowled	–	–
Wickets	–	–
Bowling average	–	–
5 wickets in innings	–	–
10 wickets in match	–	–
Best bowling	–	–
Catches/stumpings	–/–	3/–
- Source: Cricinfo, 26 July 2011

Anthony George Warrington (born 28 March 1947) is a former English cricketer. Warrington was a right-handed batsman. He was born in Ipswich, Suffolk.

Warrington made his debut for Suffolk in the 1966 Minor Counties Championship against Buckinghamshire. He played Minor counties cricket for Suffolk from 1966 to 1989, making 120 Minor Counties Championship appearances. His first List A appearance for Suffolk came against Sussex. He would make a further 4 List A appearances for the county, the last of which came against Derbyshire in the 1981 NatWest Trophy. In his 5 List A matches for Suffolk, he scored 44 runs at an average of 8.80, with a high score of 18.

It was however for Minor Counties South that he had made his List A debut for, back in the 1973 Benson & Hedges Cup against Hampshire. He would make a further 6 List A appearances for the team, the last of which came against Middlesex in the 1975 Benson & Hedges Cup. In his 7 List A matches for Minor Counties South, he scored 103 runs at an average of 14.71, with a high score of 44. He also played 2 first-class matches for the Minor Counties cricket team, the first of which came against the touring West Indians in 1973. He scored his maiden and only first-class half century in the Minor Counties first-innings, compiling 92 runs before being dismissed by VanBurn Holder. He scored 25 runs in their second-innings, before being dismissed by the same bowler. His second first-class match came the following year against the touring Pakistanis. This match saw Warrington make 25 runs in the Minor Counties first-innings, before being dismissed by Imran Khan, while in their second-innings he scored 15 runs before being dismissed by Asif Masood.
