= Harry Baker (footballer, born 1990) =

English footballer

Personal information
- Full name: Harry Kenneth Baker
- Date of birth: 20 September 1990 (age 36)
- Place of birth: Bexleyheath, England
- Height: 1.80 m (5 ft 11 in)
- Position: Midfielder

Team information
- Current team: Grays Athletic

Youth career
- ?–2008: Leyton Orient

Senior career*
Years	Team	Apps	(Gls)
2008–2010	Leyton Orient	7	(0)
2010	→ Grays Athletic (loan)	4	(0)
2010–2012	Dover Athletic	57	(12)
2012	Welling United	21	(3)
2012–2014	Bishop's Stortford	63	(1)
2014–20??	Billericay Town		
2020–	Grays Athletic		
- * Club domestic league appearances and goals

Harry Kenneth Baker (born 20 September 1990) is an English footballer, who plays for Grays Athletic in the Isthmian League.

== Career ==
Baker made his professional debut on 7 October 2008 in Leyton Orient's Football League Trophy defeat against Brighton & Hove Albion, which was concluded in a penalty shootout.

On 12 January 2010, he joined Grays Athletic on loan, and stayed with the Essex club until 11 February. He was unable to secure a regular place in the first team on his return to Orient, and was released by manager Russell Slade on 9 May 2010.

Baker joined Dover Athletic on 6 August. He made his debut in the 2–2 draw with Welling United on 17 August, and scored his first goal for Dover in the 6–3 victory over Farnborough on 18 September.

Baker signed for Welling United in January 2012, scoring on his debut in the 3–1 league win over Havant & Waterlooville on 21 February.

He signed for then Conference North club Bishop's Stortford in November 2012, where he has played in a variety of positions. In 2014, he signed for Isthmian League Premier Division side Billericay Town.
