= Bexleyheath =

Coordinates: 51°27′32″N 0°08′17″E

- Town
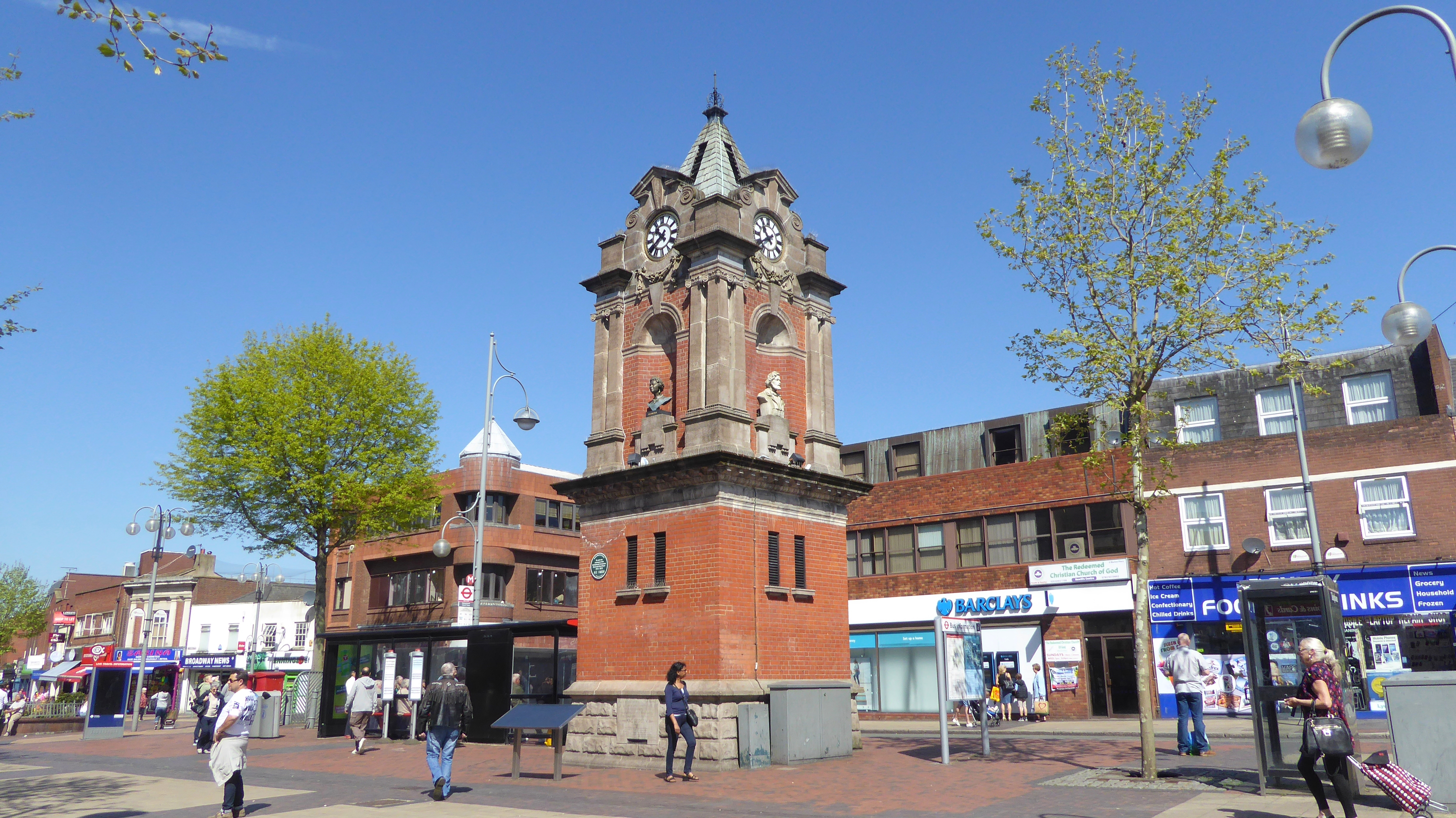
- The Clocktower in Bexleyheath

- Location within Greater London
- Population: 15,600 (2021 Census)
- OS grid reference: TQ485755
  - Charing Cross: 12 mi (19 km) WNW
- London borough: Bexley
- Ceremonial county: Greater London
- Region: London
- Country: England
- Sovereign state: United Kingdom
- Post town: BEXLEYHEATH
- Postcode district: DA6, DA7
- Dialling code: 020; 01322 (eastern parts)
- Police: Metropolitan
- Fire: London
- Ambulance: London
- UK Parliament: Bexleyheath and Crayford
- London Assembly: Bexley and Bromley

Bexleyheath is a town in southeast London, England, in the London Borough of Bexley. It had a population of approximately 15,600 in 2021 and is 12 miles (19 kilometres) southeast of Charing Cross. It is identified in the London Plan as one of 35 major centres in London. Its post town takes in other surrounding neighbourhoods, including Barnehurst, West Heath and Upton. (Note: Competing definitions are, for instance, the sum of the separate parishes of Christ Church and St Peter, Bexleyheath, or wards which change to ensure minimal malapportionment i.e. a fair level of councillor representation)

== History ==
For most of its history, Bexley heath was heath land. The Romans built a road through the heath, Watling Street, which connected Londinium (London) to Dubris (Dover). This Roman road still marks the spine of Bexley new town.

=== 18th and 19th centuries ===
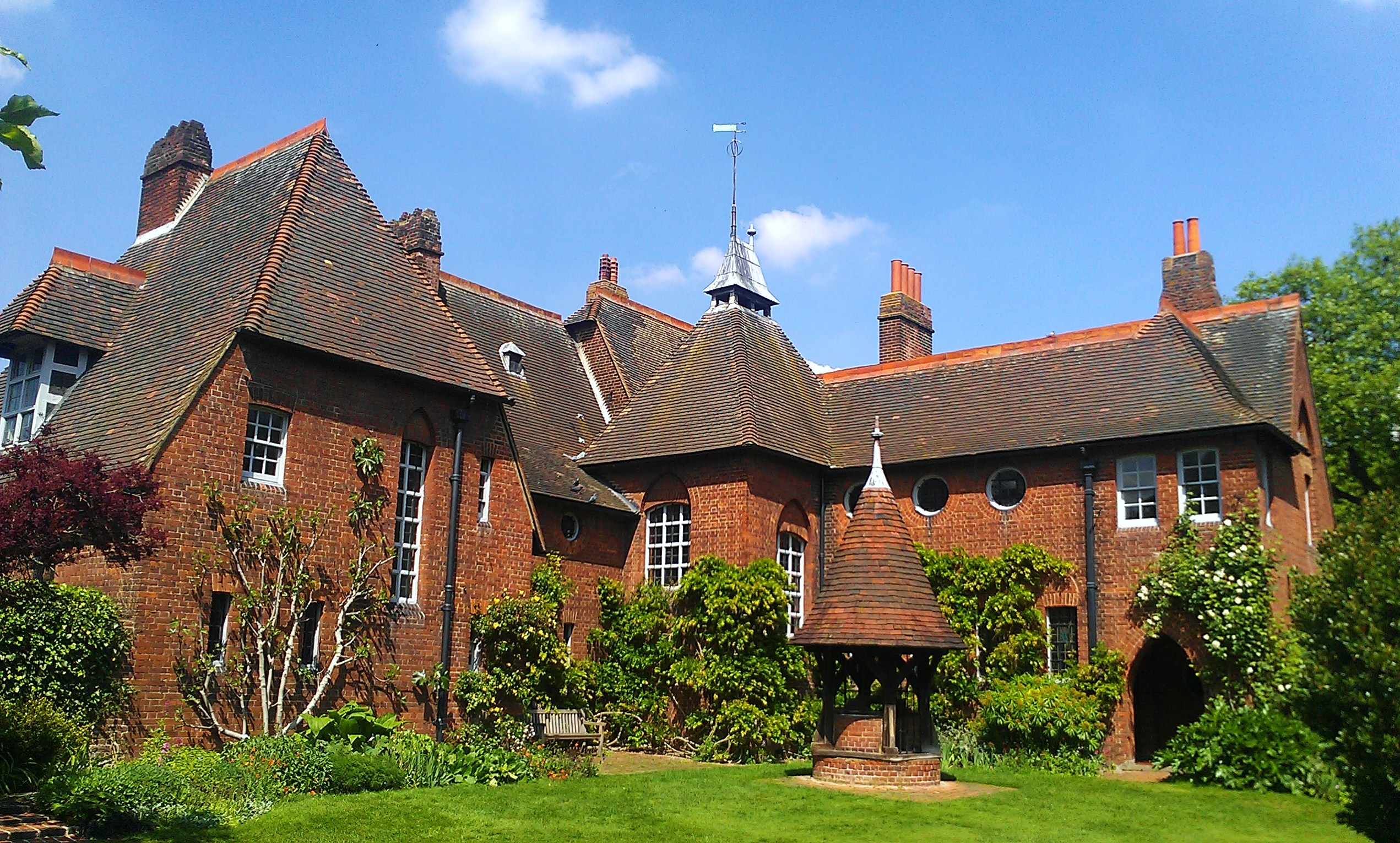
Rear of Red House, Bexleyheath

In the early 19th century, Bexley heath was a broad rough pasture and scrubland with few buildings. Its windmill stood to the north east, where Erith and Mayplace Roads now meet. In 1766 Sir John Boyd had Danson House built in his enclosed land ("park"). The core of this remains as Danson Park between the southern halves of Bexleyheath and Welling. In 1814 most of the rest of what was Bexley heath, north of Bexley, became enclosed (privatised) with a fund of money given in compensation to trustees for the poor of the parish.

In 1859 architect Philip Webb designed Red House for artist, reforming designer and socialist William Morris on the western edge of the heath, in the hamlet of Upton—before Upton became a suburb. The National Trust acquired the house in 2003. Morris wanted to have a "Palace of Art" in which he and his friends could enjoy producing works of art. The house is of red brick with a steep tiled roof and an emphasis on natural materials. It is in a brick-and-tile style to resemble cumulative generational additions. Its layout and geometrics are non-uniform and it is recognised and protected with highest category (Grade I) listed building status as it is avant-garde to influential Arts and Crafts architecture. Morris lived with wife Jane in the house for five years, during which time their two daughters, Jenny and May, were born. Needing to sell the house in 1865 to economise, Morris vowed never to return to it; he said that to see the house again would be more than he could bear.

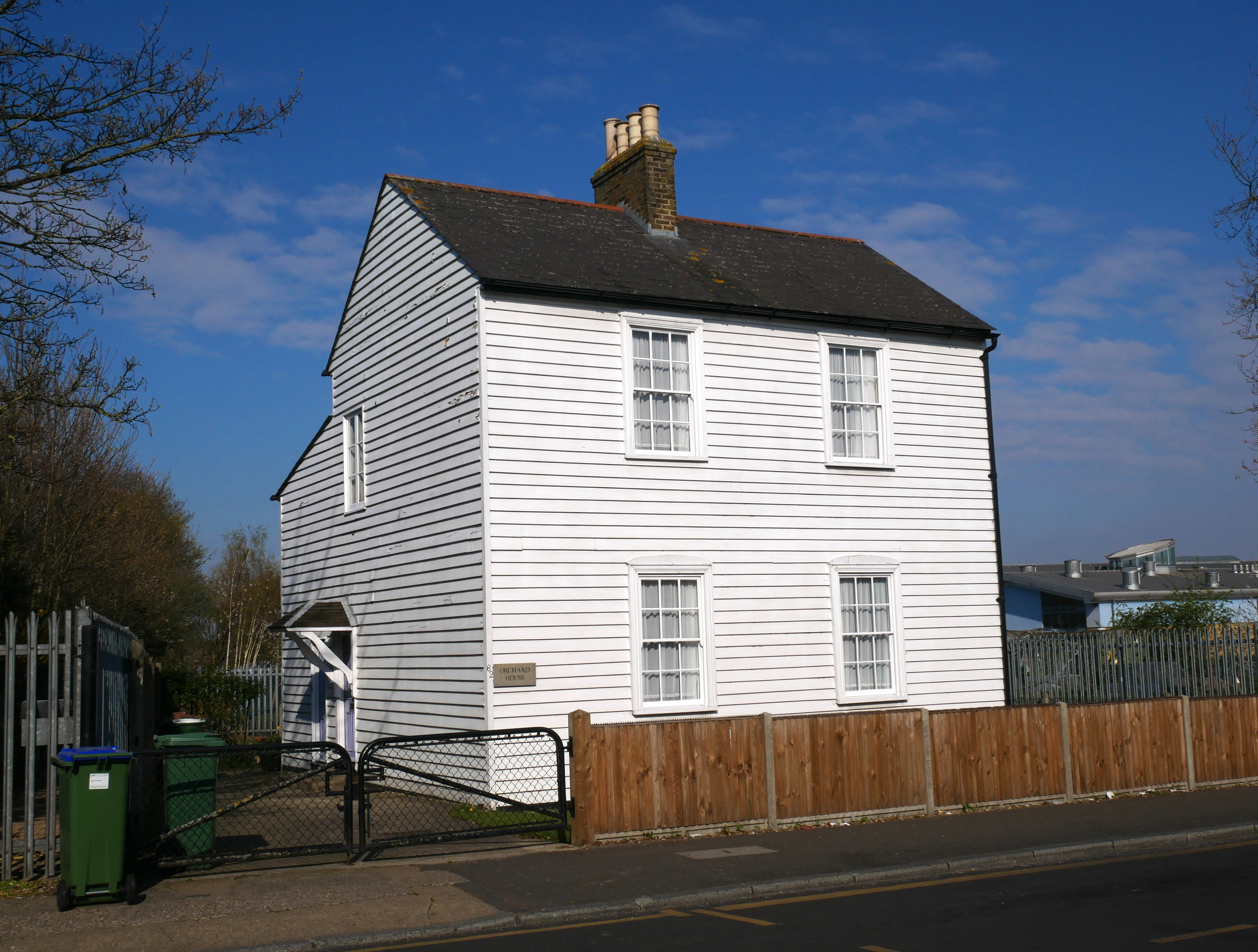
The early to mid 19th century, Grade II listed Orchard House in Bexleyheath

Bexleyheath's parish church, Christ Church, dates from 1841; and the ecclesiastical parish from 1866; the building of the current church finished in 1877. Alfred Bean, railway engineer and one-time owner of Danson House, furthered the development of Bexleyheath as a London suburb by championing the Bexleyheath Line in the 1880s to support the growth of estates around Danson Park.

=== 20th century ===
The clock tower at the centre of the modern shopping area, built in 1912, commemorates the coronation of King George V and the Diamond Jubilee of Queen Elizabeth II in 2012 when a bust of the Queen was installed.

The area was part of the historic county of Kent until the creation of Greater London in 1965, at which point Bexleyheath became the administrative base of the newly established London Borough of Bexley. The town centre shops and road layout were redeveloped in the 1980s and 1990s. The latter decade saw the pedestrianisation of the road adjacent to the shopping centre having built two minor bypass roads, Arnsburg Way and Albion Way.

== Demographics ==
According to the 2021 census from the ONS, Bexleyheath has a population of roughly 15,600, 21.8% of which are aged 65+, above the borough average of 16.5%. The largest ethnic group is White at 78.2%, higher than the borough average of 71.9%, with the second largest being Asian/Asian British at 10.7%. The largest religious group is Christianity at 49.7% of the population, followed by No religion at 33.8%, roughly the same as the borough average.

== Town centre ==
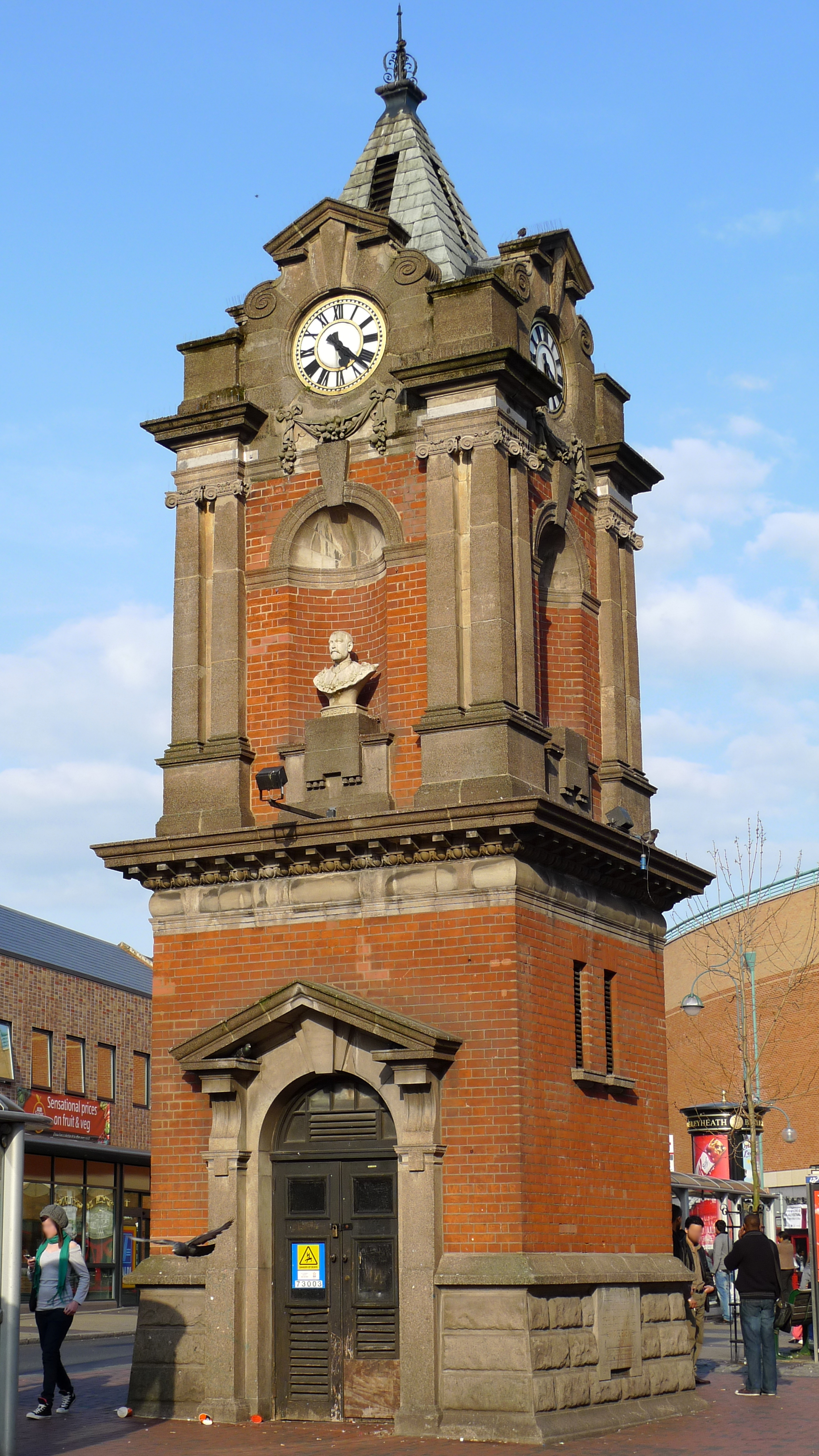
The Clocktower in the main shopping street

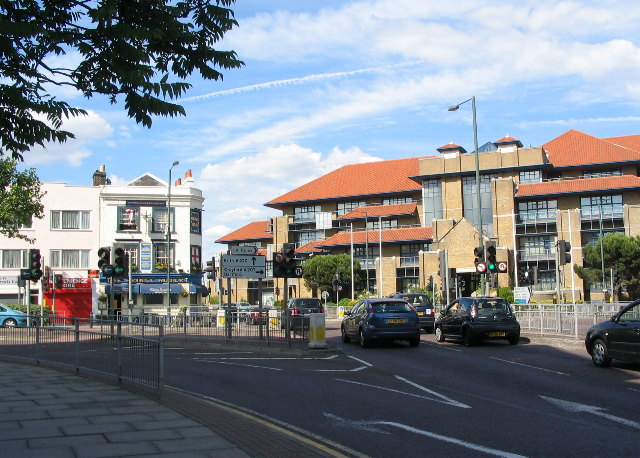
Bexley Civic Offices

The vast majority of restaurants and eateries are on Broadway. The south side of the central, pedestrianised section of Broadway hosts Broadway Shopping Centre, a covered example completed in 1984, and a substantial supermarket four years later, (Note: Asda, opened 28 November 1988) as in other urban places including New Towns. A cinema stands to the east facing a medium-sized supermarket.

A renovation in 2008 on "The Mall" gave the centre a more modern interior. The appending of "Bexleyheath Square" took place in the early 2000s, more retail units. Much of this investment provides local competition to Bluewater Shopping Centre, 5 1/2 miles (9 kilometres) east in Greenhithe, Kent.

The statue outside the Broadway Centre is "Family Outing" by local artist John Ravera; it was commissioned by Norwich Union and unveiled in 1985.

In May 2009 a major redevelopment scheme was approved by the local council following public consultation. This involved the redevelopment of the Bexley council buildings. The magistrates' court was to move to a new building where the library stands, which would be incorporated into the new development of 300 new homes. The work did not proceed as the shopping centre was sold.

In work commencing 2012, the Borough's Civic Offices were converted from the former main office of The Woolwich, which had been vacant seven years. For the resultant vacant site in June 2018, housebuilder Bellway was approved to build 518 homes, of which 110 affordable. The development will include Bexleyheath's tallest building (13 storeys), public realm improvements and offices/retail.

Given cumulative retail investment, Bexleyheath draws many customers particularly from Erith, Thamesmead, Plumstead and Woolwich which adjoin the River Thames.

== Politics and government ==
Bexleyheath is part of the Bexleyheath and Crayford constituency for elections to the House of Commons of the United Kingdom, currently represented by Daniel Francis from the Labour Party.

Bexleyheath is part of the Bexleyheath ward for elections to London Borough of Bexley.

== Leisure and culture ==
Bexleyheath has leisure facilities including the Edward Alderton Theatre, Cineworld cinema, hotel, the Central Library, Bexley Local Studies and Archive Centre, five-a-side football centre, bingo hall and ten-pin bowling alley (Ten Pin).

Bexleyheath and Belvedere Hockey Club are based in Welling, but play some home matches at Erith School.

Cultural events include regular concerts by the Sidcup Symphony Orchestra held in the hall of Townley Grammar School. The town's theatre, founded in 1976, produces many amateur productions.

== Education ==
Bexleyheath has eight primary schools and four secondary schools.

Primary schools
Name	Type	Mix	Status	Enrollment
Barrington	Primary	Mixed	Academy	210
Brampton Primary	Primary	Mixed	Academy	420
Bursted Wood	Primary	Mixed	Academy	630
Crook Log	Primary	Mixed	Community School	413
Gravel Hill	Primary	Mixed	Academy	420
Pelham	Primary	Mixed	Academy	420
St Thomas More RC	Primary	Mixed	Voluntary Aided	420
Upland	Primary	Mixed	Academy	420

Secondary schools
Name	Type	Mix	Status	Enrollment
Bexleyheath Academy	Secondary	Mixed	Academy	1144
St Catherine's Catholic School for Girls	Secondary	Girls	Voluntary Aided	1015
St Columba's Catholic Boys' School	Secondary	Boys	Voluntary Aided	815
Townley Grammar School	Secondary	Girls	Grammar	1631

== Places of worship ==
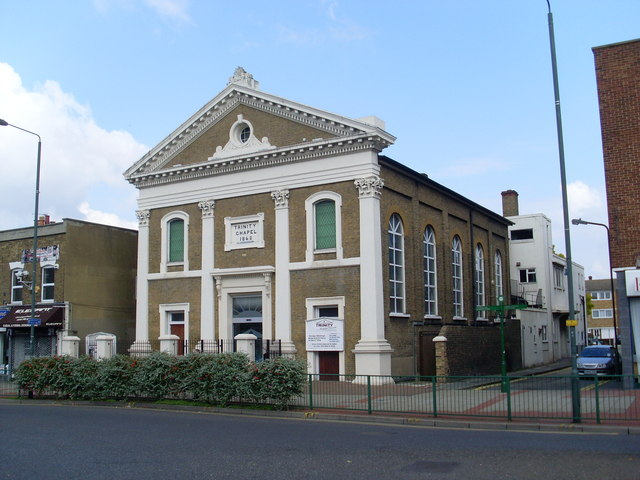
Trinity Baptist Church, Bexleyheath

There are 15 churches in Bexleyheath:

- Bethany Hall, Chapel Road, Bexleyheath
- Bexleyheath Community Church, Lyndhurst Chapel, Lyndhurst Road
- Bexleyheath United Reformed Church, Geddes Place
- Christ Church (Church of England), Broadway
- Bexleyheath Methodist Church, Broadway
- Trinity Baptist Church, Broadway
- St John Vianney Roman Catholic Church, Heathfield Road
- St Peters (Church of England), Pickford Lane
- St Thomas More Roman Catholic Church, Long Lane
- The Salvation Army, Lion Road
- Bexley Christian Life Centre (Pentecostal), Rowan Road
- Pantiles Methodist Church, Hurlingham Road
- Grace Baptist Church, Albion Road
- Christ Apostolic Church, Welling (CAC) Dove House
- Kingdom Hall of Jehovah's Witnesses, Upland Road

== Transport ==
=== Rail ===
The town is served by Bexleyheath railway station, 750 metres (820 yards) northwest of the centre on Station Road. The station is on the Bexleyheath Line, the middle of three lines connecting London and Dartford. Rail services connect the station to London Victoria via Peckham Rye, London Charing Cross, London Cannon Street, Barnehurst, Gravesend and Dartford.

=== Buses ===
Bexleyheath is an important hub for Transport for London bus services. There are services connecting it with Bromley, Crayford, Dartford, Eltham, Erith, Lewisham, North Greenwich, Orpington, Sidcup, Thamesmead, Welling and Woolwich.

== Notable residents ==
- Marjory Allen, Lady Allen of Hurtwood (1897–1976), landscape architect and child welfare campaigner
- Harry Baker (1990–), footballer, born in Bexleyheath
- Stephanie Brind (1977–), professional squash player, born in Bexleyheath and lived on Chieveley Road
- Jimmy Bullard (1978–), Premiership football player
- Kate Bush (1958–), singer-songwriter, born in Bexleyheath
- Hall Caine (1853–1931), author, lived in Aberleigh Lodge, Bexleyheath from 1884 to 1889 next door to Red House. Aberleigh Lodge was demolished in the 1970s.
- David Daniels (1942–), cricketer, born in Bexleyheath
- Bernie Ecclestone (1930–), Formula 1 magnate, grew up in Danson Road
- Frank Farmer (1912–2004), physicist, pioneer in developing medical applications for physics, born in Bexleyheath
- Colin Gill (1892–1940), artist, born in Bexleyheath
- Jake Goodman (1993–), footballer, lives in Bexleyheath
- Sheila Hancock (1933–), actress, lived in Latham Road
- Mary Kingsley (1862–1900), ethnographer, scientific writer, and explorer, lived as a young woman with her mother and brother in Southwood or Southwark House, Main Road (Crook Log).
- Neal Lawson (1963–), politician and commentator, grew up and went to school in Bexleyheath
- Lenny McLean (1949–98), actor, bouncer, bare-knuckle boxer and 'hardest man in Britain', lived in Bexleyheath in later life
- Jo Malone (1963–), perfumer and businesswoman.
- William Morris (1834–96) lived in Red House for much of his life, when Bexleyheath was mostly countryside
- Melita Norwood (1912–2005), Cold War Soviet spy
- Kenneth Noye (1947–), gangster and convicted murderer, born on Lavernock Road
- Tom Raworth (1938–2017), poet and visual artist, born in Bexleyheath and grew up in Welling
- Liam Ridgewell (1984–), Portland Timbers footballer, born in Bexleyheath, attended Bexleyheath School
- Delia Smith (1941–), television-chef, grew up in Bexleyheath, attended Bexleyheath School
- Eric Stephenson (1914–44), footballer (Leeds United), born in Bexleyheath
- Andy Townsend (1963–), professional footballer, grew up in Bexleyheath, attended Bexleyheath School
- Charles Tupper (1821–1915), Canada's sixth Prime Minister lived his retirement years in Bexleyheath
