= St Columba's Catholic Boys' School =

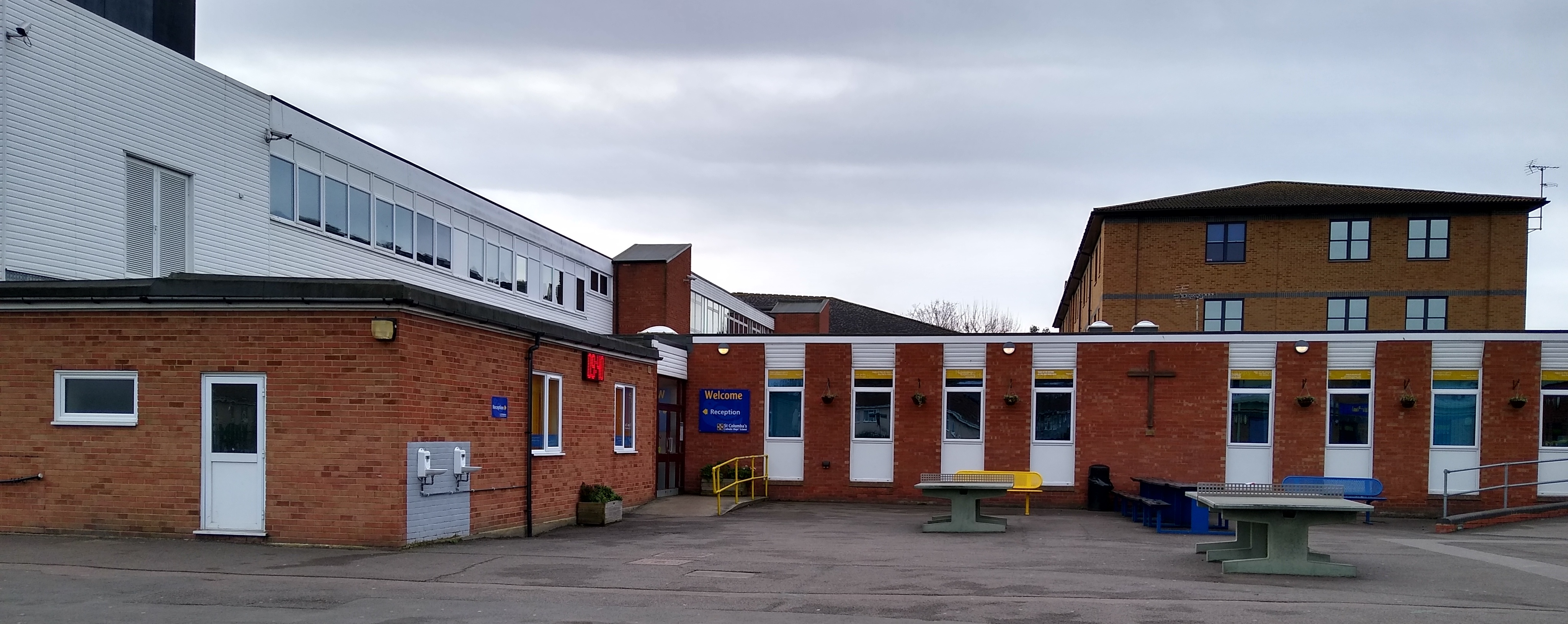

Location
- Halcot Avenue; Bexleyheath, Greater London, DA6 7QB; England; 51.45184°N 0.15558°E

Information
- Type: Academy
- Motto: Latin: Tenui Nec Dimittam "I have taken hold and will not let go"
- Religious affiliation: Roman Catholic
- Established: 1973
- Department for Education URN: 138650 Tables
- Ofsted: Reports
- Head Teacher: D Evans
- Gender: Boys
- Age: 11 to 16
- Houses: Becket Campion Fisher . More . Xavier Loyola
- Website: http://www.st-columbas.bexley.sch.uk/

St Columba's Catholic Boys' School is a Roman Catholic boys' secondary school with academy status, located in the Bexleyheath area of the London Borough of Bexley, England. The school is part of the St Oscar Romero Catholic Academy Trust situated in the Archdiocese of Southwark.

== Description ==
St. Columba's Catholic Boys' School was opened by the then Conservative Prime Minister Edward Heath on 7 May 1973. The lower and upper sections of the school were amalgamated on the present site in June 1990 in an extended building. A£5 million new build project on the site which included a new teaching block, new sports hall, and refurbished theatre was opened in 2005.

The school converted to academy status in September 2012, and it was previously under the direct control of Bexley London Borough Council. The school continues to coordinate with Bexley London Borough Council for admissions.

St. Columba's Catholic Boys' School serves the same community as St. Catherine's Catholic School for Girls, which is on a separate site nearby.

St Columba's Catholic Boys' School was inspected by Ofsted on 26 and 27 November 2024. Inspectors concluded that the school had taken effective action to maintain the standards identified at its previous inspection, retaining its existing Good judgement.

The report described St Columba's as a "happy, inclusive school" with high expectations for learning, behaviour and attendance. Inspectors praised the school's ambitious curriculum, positive pupil attitudes and provision for pupils with special educational needs and disabilities (SEND). They also highlighted the school's strong extracurricular opportunities, careers guidance and pastoral support, noting that pupils "behave with courtesy and respect".

== Alumni ==
- Tayo Adamarola (b.2005) - footballer
- Joseph Blackmore (b. 2003) - cyclist
- Finn O'Mara (b. 1999) – footballer
