= Steve Watts =

Steve or Stephen Watts may refer to:

- Steve Watts (footballer), English footballer
- Steve Watts (musician), British jazz bass player
- Stephen Watts (cricketer), English cricketer
- Stephen G. Watts, Scottish author, film and drama critic
