= Thomas Bek =

Thomas Bek (also spelled Beck) may refer to:

- Thomas Bek (bishop of St David's) (died 1293)
- Thomas Bek (bishop of Lincoln) (1282–1347)

== See also ==
- Thomas Beck (disambiguation)
