= Townley Grammar School =

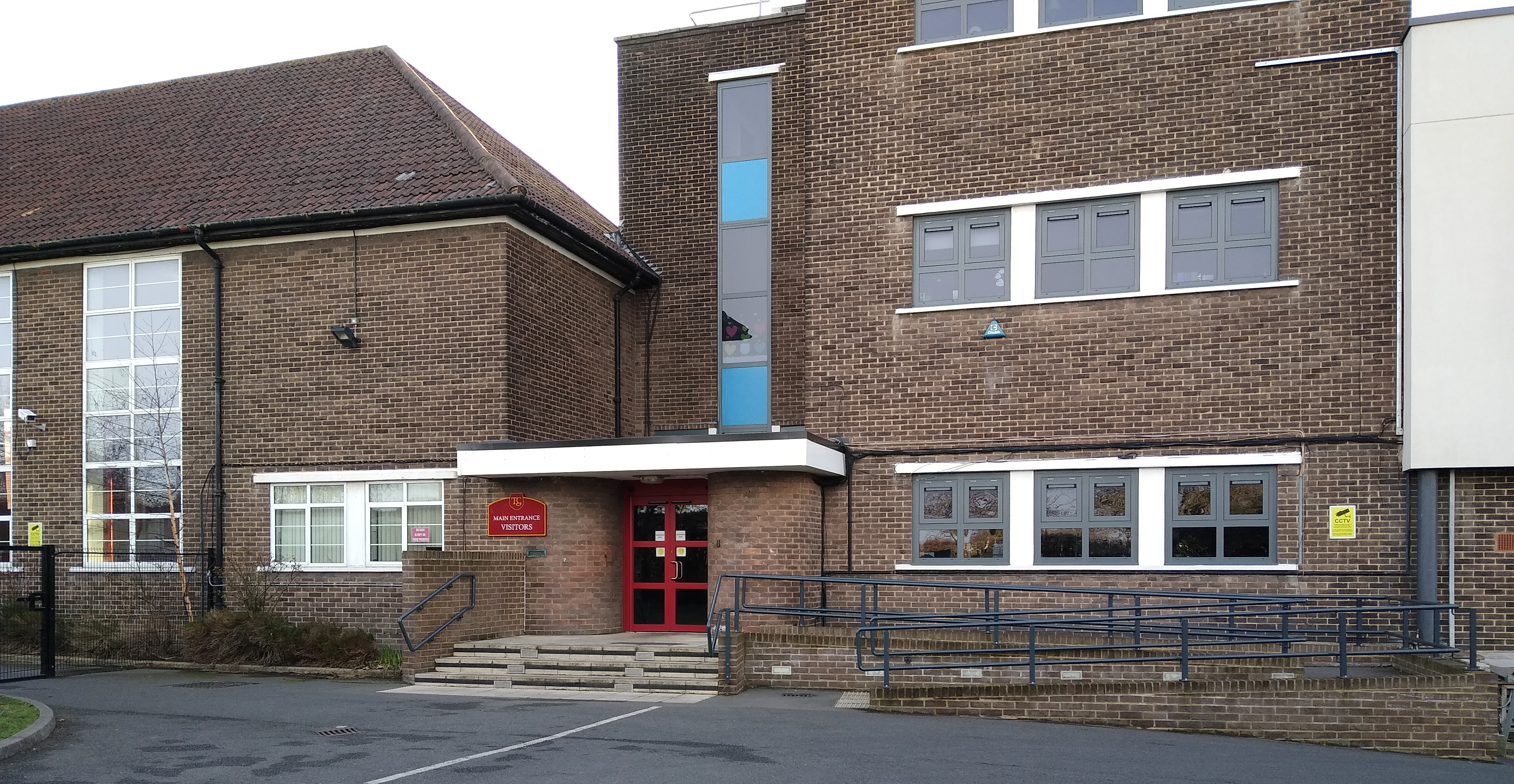

Location
- Townley Road; Bexleyheath, Greater London, DA6 7AB; England; 51°27′01″N 0°08′23″E

Information
- Type: Academy Grammar School
- Established: 1937; 89 years ago
- Status: Open
- Department for Education URN: 137769 Tables
- Ofsted: Reports
- Gender: Female (Mixed-sex sixth form)
- Age: 11 to 18
- Enrolment: c. 1,602
- Houses: Hestia, Hera, Aphrodite, Athene, Demeter, Artemis and Persephone
- Interim Headteacher: Sarina Totty
- Website: http://www.townleygrammar.org.uk/

Townley Grammar School is a grammar school with academy status for girls on Townley Road, Bexleyheath, in the London Borough of Bexley, England. It was previously known as Bexley Technical High School for Girls. The school consists of Years 7–11, single sex (girls), and a mixed-sex sixth form.

The school specialises in STEM (science, technology, engineering, and maths) subjects as a core for its GCSE. In June 2018, the school was featured in the BBC Two documentary Grammar Schools: Who Will Get In?.

== Academics ==
The Sixth Form returns excellent exam results; in excess of 98% of students enter higher education at 18, and the school regularly appears in the Sunday Times Good Schools Guide.

In 2008 the school had 4 students going onto courses of study at Oxbridge, the highest number for a state school in Bexley.

At GCSE, students perform well, consistently achieving a 100% pass rate.

The only way to gain entry to the school is through the 11-plus.

== Curriculum ==
The school was awarded Specialist Status for the performing and visual arts in September 2004. The school converted to academy status in 2012 but continues to specialise in performing and visual arts, maths, and computing.

All girls take ten or eleven GCSEs. However, certain exceptional students can be entered early for subjects such as Art, Mathematics or Modern Foreign Languages if they have a special aptitude for the subject, and Mandarin used to be a part of the extracurricular programme.

Townley has a large mixed sixth form; students choose from some thirty five Advanced Level (AS and A2) courses.

== Accommodation ==
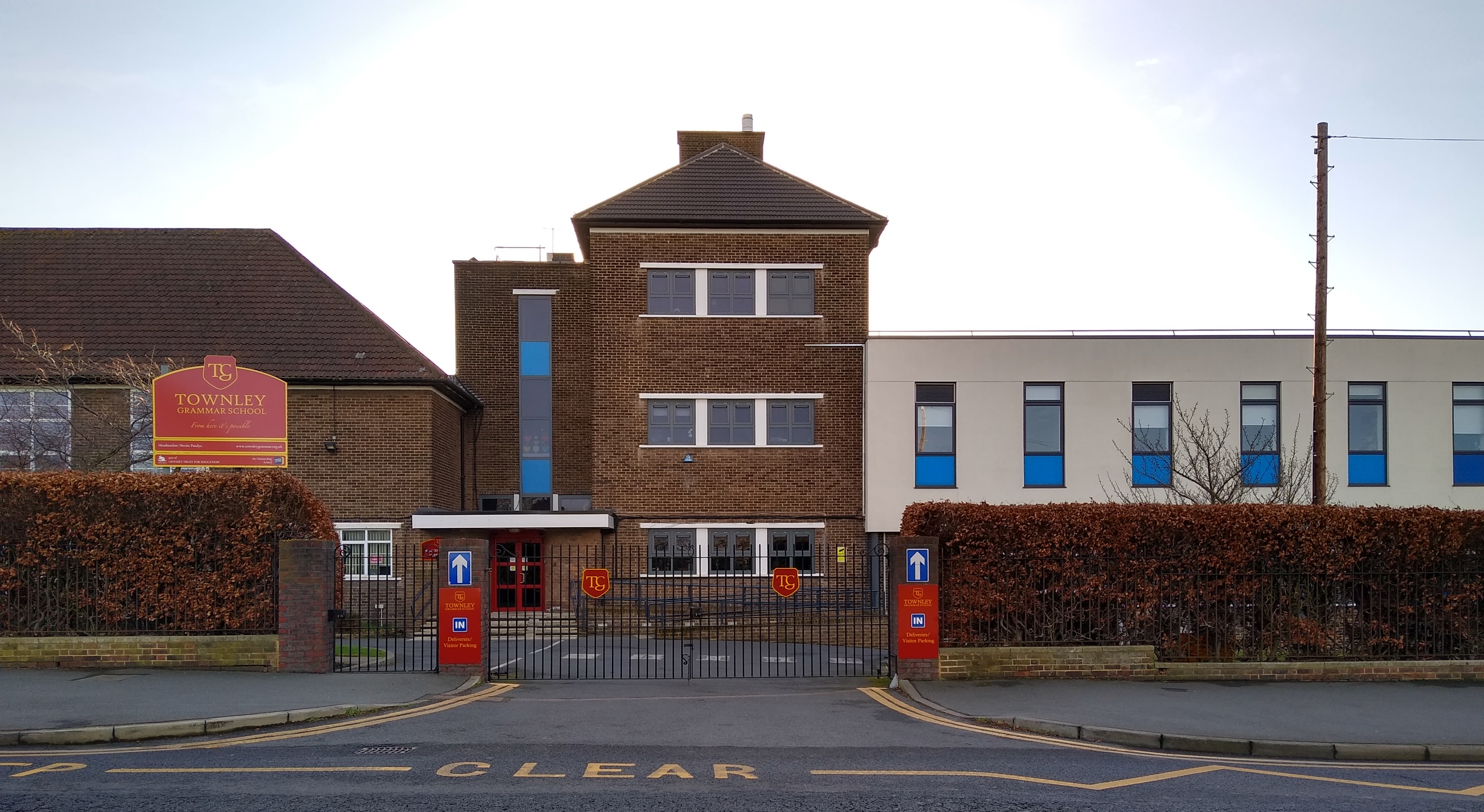
Townley Grammar School

The school is constructed on a 17-acre (6.9 ha) site and has sporting facilities. A new building was completed in 2006 which provides a theatre, recording studio, a large Sports Hall, five additional science laboratories, and a further ICT suite.

== Extra-curricular activities ==
Ofsted observed that the School's extra-curricular activities covered "an impressively wide range" and demonstrated "high standards of achievement".

The School has a long tradition for excellence in the Arts and was recently awarded the Gold Arts Mark. The school has three choirs, two orchestras, a concert band, string and woodwind ensembles.

Full-scale music, drama and dance productions have included Scarlatti's Stabat Mater, Benjamin Britten's Missa Brevis, Holst's Ave Maria, Dido and Aeneas, Vivaldi's Gloria, Oklahoma!, Sweet Charity, The Visit, Cabaret, 42nd Street, Rainbow's Ending, The Boy Friend, Cats, The Sound of Music, Bugsy Malone, Tales Untold, Jesus Christ Superstar Variations, A Midsummer Night's Dream, Oliver!, Hairspray, Annie, Matilda and SIX. In December 2017, there was a musical production of School of Rock.

Townley works with Rose Bruford College, Trinity College of Music, Laban, The Royal Ballet and Tate Modern.

Regular exchanges take place with The Shri Ram School in Delhi, India and the Franz Stock Gymnasium in Arnsberg, Germany. Adventure holidays for lower school take place in the UK. The school also visits Silicon Valley, San Francisco, as well as New York City.

== Notable former pupils and staff ==
- Baroness Valerie Amos, Labour politician and diplomat, British High Commissioner to Australia. Member of Tony Blair's cabinet as Secretary of State for International Development, Leader of the House of Lords and Lord President of the Council. Amos is the first black head of an Oxford University college, was also the school's first black Deputy Head Girl.
- Zoe Smith, Olympic weightlifter, Commonwealth champion, finished at Townley in 2012
- Nadine Ijewere, British photographer.
