= Central Library (Bexleyheath) =

Library in London, England

Coordinates: 51.4556°N 0.1436°E

Bexleyheath Central Library
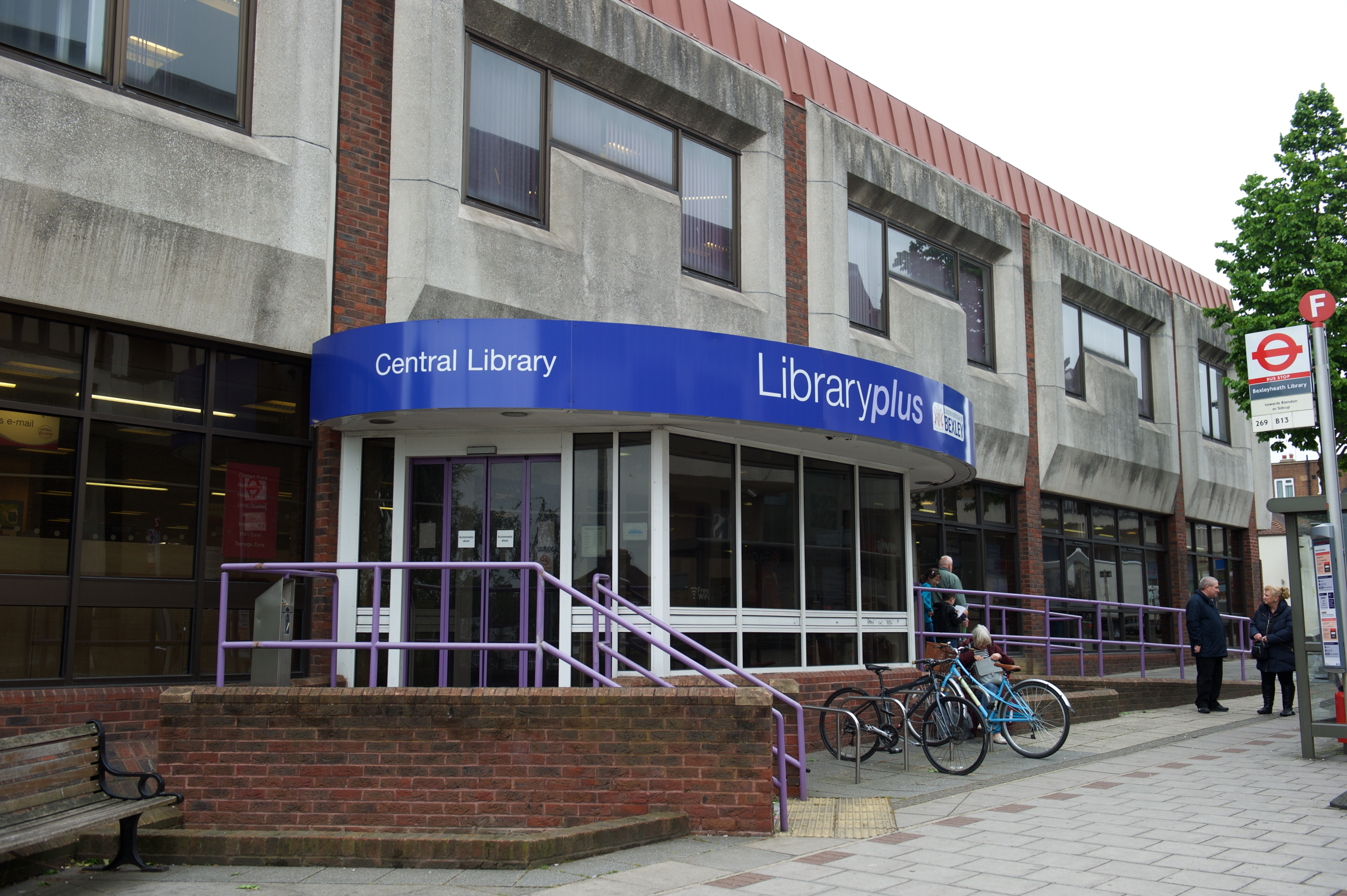
- Scope: Public Library, Reference Library
- Branch of: Bexley Libraries

The Central Library is the main library for the London Borough of Bexley, now located on Townley Road in Bexleyheath. It also houses the borough's Local Studies and Archive Centre.

The first Bexleyheath Central Library was opened in 1934, on Bexleyheath Broadway, it was known as "the wooden hut" and is now a cocktail bar.

The building that now houses the library was first opened in 1980 with the final phase of its development in 1989. It has since had more redevelopments and refurbishments, the most recent in 2005 when the library had a new entrance built.
