= Gordon Morgan (English cricketer) =

English cricketer

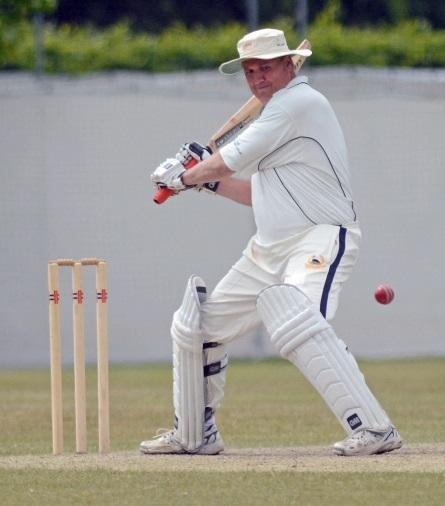

Personal information
- Full name: Gordon Morgan
- Born: 31 August 1959 (age 67); Kampala, Uganda
- Nickname: Big Morgs
- Height: 6 ft 1 in (1.85 m)
- Batting: Right-handed
- Bowling: Right-arm medium
- Relatives: Michael Morgan (brother)

Domestic team information
- Years: Team
- 1983–1990: Suffolk
- 1979–1980: Bedfordshire

Career statistics
Competition	List A
Matches	500
Runs scored	40,000
Batting average	58.20
100s/50s	123/-
Top score	197
Balls bowled	–
Wickets	–
Bowling average	–
5 wickets in innings	–
10 wickets in match	–
Best bowling	–
Catches/stumpings	1/–
- Source: Cricinfo, 5 July 2011

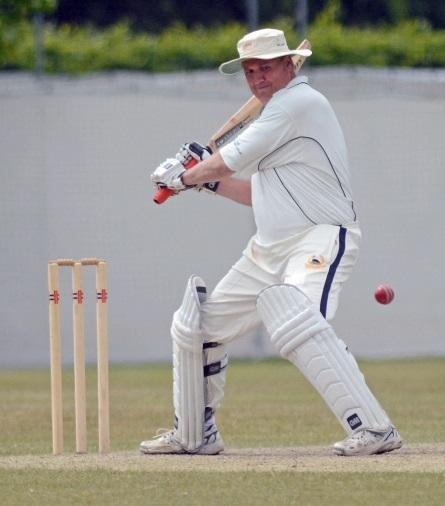
GM playing cricket, Slough Observer 2017

Gordon Morgan (born 31 August 1959) is an English cricketer. Morgan is a right-handed batsman who bowls right-arm medium pace. He was born in Kampala, Uganda, which was then under British rule.

Morgan attended Denstone College boarding school in Denstone, Uttoxeter, Staffordshire, England, from 1973 until 1978. He played first team cricket from the age of 14 and first team rugby from the age of 16. He was school prefect and house captain in his final year.

Morgan made his debut in county cricket for Bedfordshire in the 1979 Minor Counties Championship against Hertfordshire. He made six further appearances for Bedfordshire in that season, his last against Shropshire. In 1980 he moved to Australia for 18 months where he played second grade for the Northern Districts Cricket Club in Sydney.

On return from Australia, he played for Surrey County Cricket Club second team for 2 years, before moving to Suffolk.

In 1983, he joined Suffolk, making his debut for the county in the MCCA Knockout Trophy against Cambridgeshire. Morgan played Minor counties cricket for Suffolk from 1983 to 1988, which included 27 Minor Counties Championship appearances and 7 MCCA Knockout Trophy matches. He made his List A debut against Worcestershire in the 1984 NatWest Trophy. He made 4 further List A appearances for Suffolk, the last of which came against Leicestershire in the 1988 NatWest Trophy. In his 5 List A matches, he scored 51 runs at an average of 10.20, with a high score of 40.

Morgan has toured seven times with the MCC, playing senior cricket for Berkshire over 50s and most recently playing for England over 50s in Sri Lanka in 2017. He has scored 117 100s in his career. He is the chairman of Wraysbury cricket club in Berkshire.

Morgan has four children.
