= Tom Beck =

Tom Beck may refer to:

- Tom Beck (American football, born 1940), American football player and coach
- Tom Beck (American football, born 1974), American football player
- Tom Beck (actor) (born 1978), German entertainer
- Tom Beck, fictional president of the United States in the film Deep Impact

== See also ==
- Thomas Beck (disambiguation)
