= Matthew White (cricketer) =

English cricketer

Personal information
- Full name: Matthew Richard White
- Born: 26 September 1969 (age 57); Bedford, Bedfordshire
- Batting: Right-handed
- Bowling: Right-arm fast
- Relatives: Richard White (father)

Domestic team information
- Years: Team
- 1989–1998: Bedfordshire

Career statistics
| Competition | List A |
|---|---|
| Matches | 3 |
| Runs scored | 8 |
| Batting average | 4.00 |
| 100s/50s | 0/0 |
| Top score | 6* |
| Balls bowled | 182 |
| Wickets | 2 |
| Bowling average | 66.00 |
| 5 wickets in innings | 0 |
| 10 wickets in match | – |
| Best bowling | 1/35 |
| Catches/stumpings | 0/– |
- Source: Cricinfo, 28 May 2011

Matthew Richard White (born 26 September 1969) is a former English cricketer. White was a right-handed batsman who bowled right-arm fast. Born in Bedford and educated at Bedford Modern School, he is the son of Richard White, who also played cricket for Bedfordshire.

White made his debut for Bedfordshire in the 1989 MCCA Knockout Trophy against Norfolk. He played Minor counties cricket for Bedfordshire from 1989 to 1998, which included 18 Minor Counties Championship matches and 19 MCCA Knockout Trophy matches. He made his List A debut against Warwickshire in the 1994 NatWest Trophy. He played 2 further List A matches, against Glamorgan in the 1997 NatWest Trophy and against the same opposition in the 1998 NatWest Trophy. In his 3 matches, he scored 8 runs at a batting average of 4.00, with a high score of 6*. With the ball, he took 3 wickets at a bowling average of 66.00, with best figures of 1/35. Of those wickets, the most prominent was that of Brian Lara, bowled for 23 in the match against Warwicks.
