= Jonathan Walford =

English cricketer

Personal information
- Full name: Jonathan Edwin Peter Walford
- Born: 24 January 1982 (age 44); Hornchurch, Greater London
- Batting: Left-handed
- Bowling: Right-arm medium

Domestic team information
- Years: Team
- 2004–2009: Bedfordshire

Career statistics
Competition	List A
Matches	1
Runs scored	27
Batting average	27.00
100s/50s	0/0
Top score	27
Catches/stumpings	0/–
- Source: Cricinfo, 28 May 2011

Jonathan Edwin Peter Walford (born 24 January 1982) is an English cricketer. Walford is a left-handed batsman who bowled right-arm medium. He was born in Hornchurch in the London Borough of Havering.

Walford made his debut for Bedfordshire in the 2004 Minor Counties Championship against Staffordshire. Walford played Minor counties cricket for Bedfordshire from 2004 to 2009, which included 11 Minor Counties Championship matches and 11 MCCA Knockout Trophy matches. He made his only List A appearance against Sussex in the 2005 Cheltenham & Gloucester Trophy. In this match, he scored 27 runs before being dismissed by James Kirtley.

He has also played Second XI cricket for the Essex, Kent, Nottinghamshire, Worcestershire and Leicestershire Second XI's.
