= Geoffrey Dawson (cricketer) =

English cricketer (born 1940)

Geoffrey Dawson (born 24 February 1940) was an English cricketer who played for Bedfordshire. He was born in Dunstable, Bedfordshire.

Dawson's first recorded Second XI matches came during the 1958 season, and he continued to play in the Second XI until 1969. His sole List A appearance came during the 1967 Gillette Cup, against Northamptonshire. Batting from the upper-middle order, he scored 14 runs in the match.
