= Harry Pilling =

English cricketer

Personal information
- Born: 23 February 1943; Ashton-under-Lyne, Lancashire
- Died: 22 September 2012 (aged 69); Little Lever, Lancashire
- Height: 5 ft 3 in (1.60 m)
- Batting: Right-handed
- Bowling: Right-arm off break
- Relatives: George Harry Pilling

Domestic team information
- Years: Team
- 1969–1974: Marylebone Cricket Club
- 1962–1982: Lancashire

Career statistics
Competition	First-class	List A
Matches	333	173
Runs scored	15,279	3,807
Batting average	32.23	26.07
100s/50s	25/81	1/22
Top score	149*	109*
Balls bowled	336	13
Wickets	1	2
Bowling average	195.00	8.00
5 wickets in innings	0	0
10 wickets in match	0	0
Best bowling	1/42	1/0
Catches/stumpings	89/–	26/–
- Source: Cricinfo, 24 September 2012

Harry Pilling (23 February 1943 – 22 September 2012) was an English cricketer. Standing just 5 feet 3 inches (1.60 m) tall he had the distinction of being the shortest English professional cricketer of modern times. A right-handed batsman, Pilling scored over 15,000 first-class runs for Lancashire, for whom he played county cricket from 1962 to 1982.

One of his most memorable innings for Lancashire was an unbeaten 70 against Sussex, which helped secure his county's first Gillette Cup success in 1970.
