= Philip August =

English cricketer (born 1949)

Personal information
- Full name: Philip George Michael August
- Born: 8 May 1949 (age 77); Enfield, Middlesex
- Batting: Left-handed
- Role: Wicket-keeper
- Relatives: George August (father)

Domestic team information
- Years: Team
- 1975–1986: Bedfordshire

Career statistics
Competition	List A
Matches	2
Runs scored	16
Batting average	16.00
100s/50s	0/0
Top score	16
Catches/stumpings	2/–
- Source: Cricinfo, 4 August 2011

Philip George Michael August (born 8 May 1949) is a former English cricketer. August was a left-handed batsman who fielded as a wicket-keeper. He was born in Enfield, Middlesex.

August made his debut for Bedfordshire against Shropshire in the 1975 Minor Counties Championship. He played Minor counties cricket for Bedfordshire from 1975 to 1986, making 71 Minor Counties Championship appearances and 5 MCCA Knockout Trophy appearances. He made his List A debut against Somerset in the 1982 NatWest Trophy. In this match, he was not required to bat, with Somerset winning by 4 wickets. He made a further List A appearance against Gloucestershire in the 1985 NatWest Trophy. He scored 16 runs in this match, before being dismissed by Courtney Walsh.

His father, George, also played Minor counties cricket for Bedfordshire, as well as first-class cricket for the Minor Counties cricket team.
