= Ian Fantham =

English cricketer

Personal information
- Full name: Ian James Fantham
- Born: 13 October 1964 (age 62); Hemel Hempstead, Hertfordshire
- Batting: Left-handed
- Bowling: Right-arm medium

Domestic team information
- Years: Team
- 1993–1995: Hertfordshire
- 1996–2000: Bedfordshire

Career statistics
| Competition | List A |
|---|---|
| Matches | 3 |
| Runs scored | 32 |
| Batting average | 16.00 |
| 100s/50s | 0/0 |
| Top score | 32 |
| Balls bowled | 162 |
| Wickets | 0 |
| Bowling average | – |
| 5 wickets in innings | – |
| 10 wickets in match | – |
| Best bowling | – |
| Catches/stumpings | 0/– |
- Source: Cricinfo, 28 May 2011

Ian James Fantham (born 13 October 1964) is a former English cricketer. Fantham was a left-handed batsman who bowled right-arm medium pace. He was born in Hemel Hempstead, Hertfordshire.

Fantham played two Minor Counties Championship matches and one MCCA Knockout Trophy match for Hertfordshire from 1993 to 1995. He later joined Bedfordshire in the 1996 Minor Counties Championship against Staffordshire. Fantham played Minor counties cricket for Bedfordshire from 1996 to 2000, which included 18 Minor Counties Championship matches and 9 MCCA Knockout Trophy matches. He made his List A debut for Bedfordshire against Glamorgan in the 1998 NatWest Trophy. He played two further List-A matches, against Huntingdonshire in the 1999 NatWest Trophy, and Northumberland in the 2000 NatWest Trophy. In his three matches, he scored 32 runs at an average of 16.00, with a high score of 32. With the ball he failed to take a wicket, bowling 27 overs without success.
