= Michael Gear (cricketer) =

English cricketer

Personal information
- Full name: Michael Eric Gear
- Born: 7 December 1945 (age 80); Bath, Somerset
- Batting: Right-handed
- Bowling: Leg break

Domestic team information
- Years: Team
- 1970–1982: Bedfordshire
- 1973: Minor Counties South
- 1983–1984: Buckinghamshire
- 1988: Bedfordshire

Career statistics
Competition	List A
Matches	9
Runs scored	90
Batting average	10.00
100s/50s	0/0
Top score	22
Catches/stumpings	1/0
- Source: Cricinfo, 4 May 2011

Michael Eric Gear (born 7 December 1945) is a former English cricketer. Gear was a right-handed batsman who bowled leg break. He was born in Bath, Somerset.

Gear first played for Bedfordshire in the Minor Counties Championship in 1970 against Cambridgeshire. His List A debut for the county came in the 1970 Gillette Cup against Buckinghamshire. He played 5 further List A matches for Bedfordshire, the last coming against Somerset in the 1982 NatWest Trophy. While representing Bedfordshire, he played 3 List A matches for Minor Counties South in the 1973 Benson & Hedges Cup. He played Minor counties cricket for Bedfordshire until 1982, before joining Buckinghamshire for the 1984 season. He played Minor Counties cricket for the county until 1984, which also included 2 MCCA Knockout Trophy matches in 1983 against Devon and Bedfordshire. Gear also played a single List A match for Buckinghamshire in the 1984 NatWest Trophy against Lancashire, before ending his career four years later with Bedfordshire.

He also played Second XI cricket for the Surrey Second XI from 1965 to 1967.
