= Malcolm Stedman =

English cricketer

Malcolm Stedman (born 28 April 1948) was an English cricketer. He was a right-handed batsman who played for Bedfordshire. He was born in West Ham, Essex.

Having made his debut cricketing appearance at the age of just 18 for Essex Young Amateurs, Stedman turned out in the Minor Counties Championship for the first time in 1974, he had to wait until 1982 for his only List A appearance, in the NatWest Bank Trophy competition. Batting in the opening order, Stedman scored seven runs in the match.

Between 2003 and 2006, Stedman played for Bedfordshire in the Over-50s County Championship.
