= Tony Bristow =

English cricketer

Tony Robert Bristow (born 23 June 1965) is an English former cricketer. He was a left-handed batsman who played for Bedfordshire.

Born in Newcastle, New South Wales, Bristow made his first grade debut for Charlestown at the age of 17. In his mid-20s, he travelled to England as an overseas player.

Bristow made three List A appearances for Bedfordshire between 2001 and 2002, his debut coming against Dorset. In spite of his position in the lower-middle order, Bristow never batted in his one-day career. He also played a total of 13 Minor Counties games for the team.

Bristow represented an England over-50s side against Australia in 2017. He returned to Australia following the death of his wife in 2020, he was continuing to play first grade cricket at the age of 57.
