= Keith Standring =

English cricketer

Personal information
- Full name: Keith Standring
- Born: 17 May 1965 (age 61); Luton, Bedfordshire
- Batting: Left-handed
- Bowling: Left-arm medium-fast

Domestic team information
- Years: Team
- 1984–1995: Bedfordshire

Career statistics
Competition	List A
Matches	1
Runs scored	14
Batting average	–
100s/50s	0/0
Top score	14*
Balls bowled	66
Wickets	1
Bowling average	67.00
5 wickets in innings	0
10 wickets in match	–
Best bowling	1/67
Catches/stumpings	0/–
- Source: Cricinfo, 28 May 2011

Keith Standring (born 17 May 1965) is a former English cricketer. Standring was a left-handed batsman who bowled left-arm medium-fast. He was born in Luton, Bedfordshire.

Standring made his debut for Bedfordshire in the 1984 Minor Counties Championship against Staffordshire. He played Minor counties cricket for Bedfordshire from 1984 to 1995, which included 19 Minor Counties Championship matches and 5 MCCA Knockout Trophy matches. He made his only List A appearance against Warwickshire in the 1994 NatWest Trophy. In this match he scored an unbeaten 14 runs, while with the ball he took the wicket of Trevor Penney for the cost of 67 runs from 11 overs.
