= Timothy Roberts (cricketer) =

English cricketer

Tim Roberts
Personal information
- Full name: Timothy William Roberts
- Born: 4 March 1978 (age 48); Kettering, Northamptonshire
- Batting: Right-handed
- Bowling: Right-arm off break
- Role: Batsman
- Relatives: Andrew Roberts (brother)

Domestic team information
- Years: Team
- 2001–2002: Lancashire
- 2003–2005: Northamptonshire

Career statistics
Competition	FC	LA	T20
Matches	32	46	12
Runs scored	1,235	1,129	167
Batting average	25.20	26.25	18.55
100s/50s	0/9	2/5	0/0
Top score	89	131	43
Balls bowled	114	36	–
Wickets	1	0	–
Bowling average	20.00	–	–
5 wickets in innings	0	–	–
10 wickets in match	0	–	–
Best bowling	1/10	–	–
Catches/stumpings	21/–	10/–	1/–
- Source: CricketArchive, 15 June 2010

Timothy William Roberts (born 4 March 1978) is an English former cricketer who represented Lancashire and Northamptonshire. Roberts was a right-handed batsman who bowled right-arm off break.

== Personal ==
Roberts studied at Durham University, where he played for the cricket team and was also selected for British Universities.

== Career ==
After a brief spell at Lancashire playing only four first-class games, he moved to Northamptonshire for two years scoring over 1000 first-class runs and scoring a best one day score of 131 against Nottinghamshire. While at Northamptonshire, he played regularly for Finedon Dolben and continued until the end of the 2009 season.
