= Andrew Roberts (Northamptonshire cricketer) =

English cricketer (born 1971)

Personal information
- Full name: Andrew Richard Roberts
- Born: 16 April 1971 (age 55); Kettering, Northamptonshire, England
- Batting: Right-handed
- Bowling: Leg break
- Relatives: Timothy Roberts (brother)

Domestic team information
- Years: Team
- 1989–1996: Northamptonshire
- 1993/94: Wellington
- 1997–2010: Bedfordshire

Career statistics
Competition	First-class	List A
Matches	61	32
Runs scored	1,173	462
Batting average	18.04	24.31
100s/50s	0/2	1/1
Top score	62	113
Balls bowled	9,203	1,157
Wickets	107	38
Bowling average	45.13	22.92
5 wickets in innings	1	2
10 wickets in match	0	0
Best bowling	6/72	5/28
Catches/stumpings	23/–	11/–
- Source: Cricinfo, 24 September 2011

Andrew Richard Roberts (born 16 April 1971) is a former English cricketer. Roberts was a right-handed batsman who bowled leg break. He was born in Kettering, Northamptonshire and is the brother of cricketer Timothy Roberts.

== Northamptonshire ==
Roberts made his first-class debut for Northamptonshire against Glamorgan in the 1989 County Championship. The following season he made three Youth Test appearances for England Young Cricketers against Pakistan Young Cricketers. These were to be his only international honours. Roberts' first-class career with Northamptonshire continued until the 1996 season, when he made his final first-class appearance against Worcestershire in the 1996 County Championship. He made 59 first-class appearances for Northamptonshire, scoring 1,119 runs at an average of 18.04, with a high score of 62. This score, which was one of two fifties he made, came against Nottinghamshire in 1992. As a leg spin bowler (a rarity in modern first-class cricket in England), Roberts took 107 wickets at a bowling average of 44.60, with best figures of 6/72. These figures, his only five wicket haul, came against Lancashire in 1988. His List A debut came against Worcestershire in the 1991 Refuge Assurance League. He made thirteen further List A appearances for Northamptonshire, the last of which came against Sussex in the 1995 AXA Equity & Law League. In his thirteen List A matches for the county, he took 13 wickets at an average of 26.30, with best figures of 3/26. With the bat, he scored 42 runs at an average of 8.40, with a high score of 20. He left Northamptonshire at the end of the 1996 season.

While at Northamptonshire and following the 1993 English cricket season, Roberts played two first-class matches for Wellington in New Zealand, both against Auckland.

== Bedfordshire ==
Roberts joined Bedfordshire in 1997, making his debut for the county against Cumberland in the Minor Counties Championship. He played Minor counties cricket for Bedfordshire 1997 to 2010, making 85 Minor Counties Championship and 48 MCCA Knockout Trophy appearances. He made his first List A appearance representing Bedfordshire against Glamorgan in the 1997 NatWest Trophy. The following season he made two List A appearances for the Minor Counties against Northamptonshire and Nottinghamshire. Roberts made fifteen further List A appearances for Bedfordshire, the last of which came against Sussex in the 2005 Cheltenham & Gloucester Trophy. In his sixteen List A matches for Bedfordshire, he scored 379 runs at an average of 31.58, which included his only century in that format. This score came against the Derbyshire Cricket Board in the 2002 Cheltenham & Gloucester Trophy. With the ball, he took 25 wickets at an average of 19.92, with best figures of 5/28. These figures, which were one of two five wicket hauls he took in that format for Bedfordshire, came against Huntingdonshire in the 1999 NatWest Trophy.
