= Philip Hoare (cricketer) =

English cricketer

Phillip Hoare
Personal information
- Full name: Phillip David Baxter Hoare
- Born: 29 November 1962 (age 63); Bedford, Bedfordshire
- Batting: Right-handed
- Bowling: Right-arm medium
- Relatives: David Hoare (father)

Domestic team information
- Years: Team
- 1985–1999: Bedfordshire

Career statistics
Competition	List A
Matches	7
Runs scored	52
Batting average	10.40
100s/50s	0/0
Top score	17
Balls bowled	72
Wickets	2
Bowling average	32.00
5 wickets in innings	0
10 wickets in match	–
Best bowling	2/64
Catches/stumpings	5/–
- Source: Cricinfo, 3 August 2011

Phillip David Baxter Hoare (born 29 November 1962) is a former English cricketer. Hoare was a right-handed batsman who bowled right-arm medium pace. He was born in Bedford, Bedfordshire.

Hoare made his debut for Bedfordshire against Hertfordshire in the 1985 Minor Counties Championship. He played Minor counties cricket for Bedfordshire from 1985 to 1999, making 106 Minor Counties Championship appearances and 30 MCCA Knockout Trophy appearances. He made his List A debut against Gloucestershire in the 1985 NatWest Trophy. He made 6 further List A appearances, the last of which came against Derbyshire in the 1999 NatWest Trophy. In his 7 List A matches, he scored 52 runs at an average of 10.40, with a high score of 17. With the ball, he took 2 wickets at a bowling average of 32.00, with best figures of 2/64.

His father, David, also played for Bedfordshire.
