= Andrew Patterson (cricketer) =

Irish cricketer (born 1975)

Personal information
- Full name: Andrew David Patterson
- Born: 4 September 1975 (age 51); Belfast, Northern Ireland
- Batting: Right-handed
- Role: Wicket-keeper

Domestic team information
- Years: Team
- 1996–2002: Ireland
- 2000: Sussex
- 2002–2004: Bedfordshire
- 2000: Sussex

Career statistics
Competition	First-class	List A
Matches	10	26
Runs scored	155	308
Batting average	11.07	14.66
100s/50s	0/0	0/1
Top score	31	50
Catches/stumpings	18/–	21/6
- Source: Cricinfo, 20 April 2021

Andrew David Patterson (born 4 September 1975) is a former Northern Irish cricketer who played for Sussex County Cricket Club.

== Cricket career ==
He was a right-handed batsman and a wicket-keeper. He made his debut for Ireland against Wales in 1996, and went on to play for them in 61 matches, including two ICC Trophy tournaments. He also played for Northern Ireland in the cricket tournament at the 1998 Commonwealth Games, county cricket for Sussex and minor counties cricket for Bedfordshire.

== Post cricket career ==
After retirement from professional cricket, Patterson became a PE teacher at Caterham School in Surrey.

== Personal and family life ==
His brother Mark also played for Ireland and Bedfordshire.

In 2013, Patterson was diagnosed with spastic paraplegia and in 2020 was given the prognosis that he will require a wheelchair.
