= Chris Bullen =

English cricketer (born 1962)

Personal information
- Full name: Christopher Keith Bullen
- Born: 5 November 1962 (age 64); Clapham, London, England
- Batting: Right-handed
- Bowling: Right-arm off break
- Relatives: David Roberts (cousin)

Domestic team information
- Years: Team
- 1982–1991: Surrey
- 1992–1997: Bedfordshire
- 1994: Minor Counties
- 1998–2002: Surrey Cricket Board

Career statistics
| Competition | First-class | List A |
|---|---|---|
| Matches | 31 | 112 |
| Runs scored | 665 | 789 |
| Batting average | 22.93 | 22.54 |
| 100s/50s | 0/4 | 0/1 |
| Top score | 65 | 93* |
| Balls bowled | 2,469 | 4,826 |
| Wickets | 40 | 102 |
| Bowling average | 28.75 | 33.69 |
| 5 wickets in innings | 1 | 1 |
| 10 wickets in match | 0 | 0 |
| Best bowling | 6/119 | 5/31 |
| Catches/stumpings | 31/– | 65/– |
- Source: Cricinfo, 9 June 2011

Christopher Keith Bullen (born 5 November 1962) is a former English cricketer. Bullen was a right-handed batsman who bowled right-arm off break. He was born in Clapham, London and educated at Rutlish School which he attended from 1976 to 1982. An all-rounder, Bullen played for Surrey County Cricket Club, Bedfordshire County Cricket Club and the Surrey Cricket Board in a career which spanned from 1982 to 2002.

== Surrey ==
Bullen made his first-class debut for Surrey against Oxford University in 1982. He didn't play another first-class match for Surrey until 1985, when he appeared against Cambridge University. Bullen played two Youth Test matches in 1982 for England Under-19s against West Indies Under-19s, with both Tests coming in August 1982, after his June debut for Surrey. His List A debut for Surrey also came in 1985, against Sussex in the 1985 John Player Special League. During the course of his career with Surrey, Bullen was viewed by the county as predominantly a limited-overs player: he made 104 List A appearances, as opposed to just 30 first-class appearances. Playing for Surrey until the end of the 1991 season, Bullen scored 667 runs in limited-overs cricket, at a batting average of 23.00. He made a single half century, which was to be the highest score of his List A career, scoring an unbeaten 93 against Wiltshire in the 1990 NatWest Trophy. He took 92 wickets at a bowling average of 34.22, with best figures of 5/31; his only five wicket haul in limited-overs cricket, which came against Yorkshire in the 1989 Refuge Assurance League. Bullen had his best seasons with the ball in List A cricket in the 1987, 1988 and 1989 season's, taking 20 more wickets in each. Despite not being a regular in first-class cricket for Surrey, Bullen nonetheless had some success when he did play. A competent all-rounder, he scored 663 runs in his 30 first-class matches for the county, coming at an average of 23.67. He made 4 half centuries, with a high score of 65 against the touring Pakistanis in 1987. He took 38 wickets in first-class cricket, at an average of 28.36, which was a better average than his List A wickets came at. He took just one five wicket haul in first-class matches, which came against Middlesex, with figures of 6/119.

However, 1989 saw Bullen play just two County Championship fixtures. In the following season he didn't make any first-class appearances, while in List A cricket he made 22 appearances, but struggled to make an impact. His 14 wickets that season came at an expensive average of 52.64. He made limited appearances in the 1991 English cricket season, with Surrey releasing him at the end of that season.

== Later career ==
Bullen joined Bedfordshire for the 1992 season, making his debut for the county in the Minor Counties Championship against Lincolnshire. Bullen played Minor counties cricket for Bedfordshire from 1992 to 1997, making 51 Minor Counties Championship appearances and 14 MCCA Knockout Trophy appearances. He made his first appearance for Bedfordshire in List A cricket against Warwickshire in the 1994 NatWest Trophy. He made one further appearance for the county in limited-overs cricket, against Glamorgan in the 1997 NatWest Trophy. He took 3 wickets for Bedfordshire in these 2 games, although all 3 wickets came against Warwickshire, with Bullen claiming figures of 3/58 from 10 overs. While playing for Bedfordshire, he made one final first-class appearance for the Minor Counties cricket team against the touring South Africans. In this match, he bowled 4 wicket-less overs in the South Africans first-innings, while in their second innings he took the wickets of Daryll Cullinan and Gerhardus Liebenberg for the cost of 42 runs from 8.4 overs. With the bat, he didn't bat in the Minor Counties first-innings, while in their second-innings he was dismissed for 2 runs by Pat Symcox. Bullen left Bedfordshire at the end of the 1997 season. He played for the Surrey Cricket Board in the 1998 MCCA Knockout Trophy, while in the 1999 season he made his first appearance in List A cricket for the Board in the 1999 NatWest Trophy against Norfolk. Bullen appeared in a further 5 List A matches for the Board, the last coming against Lincolnshire in the 2nd round of the 2002 Cheltenham & Gloucester Trophy, which was played in 2001. He scored 103 runs for the Board in the 6 matches, coming at an average of 25.75, with a high score of 36. With the ball, he took 7 wickets at 31.57 a piece, with best figures of 2/16. Bullen was an able fielder during his career, taking a total of 65 catches in limited-overs cricket.

Bullen currently works for Surrey County Cricket Club as a Cricket Development Manager. His cousin, David Roberts, played first-class and List A cricket.
