= David Roberts (cricketer, born 1976) =

Cornish cricketer

Personal information
- Full name: David James Roberts
- Born: 29 December 1976 (age 49); Truro, Cornwall
- Batting: Right-handed
- Bowling: Right-arm medium
- Relatives: Chris Bullen (cousin)

Domestic team information
- Years: Team
- 1996–1999: Northamptonshire
- 2001: Northamptonshire Cricket Board
- 2002: Bedfordshire
- 2003–2008: Cornwall

Career statistics
Competition	First-class	List A
Matches	17	5
Runs scored	751	97
Batting average	25.89	24.25
100s/50s	1/2	0/0
Top score	117	40
Catches/stumpings	8/–	4/–
- Source: Cricinfo, 17 October 2010

David James Roberts (born 29 December 1976) is a Cornish cricketer. Roberts is a right-handed batsman who bowls right-arm medium pace. He was born at Truro, Cornwall.

Roberts made his first-class debut for Northamptonshire against Oxford University in 1996. His County Championship debut came in the same season against Essex. From 1996 to 1999, he represented the county in 17 first-class matches, the last of which came against Somerset. In his 17 first-class matches, he scored 751 runs at a batting average of 25.89, with 2 half centuries and a single century high score of 117. In the field he took 8 catches.

In 2001, he made his debut in List A cricket for the Northamptonshire Cricket Board against the Yorkshire Cricket Board in the 2001 Cheltenham & Gloucester Trophy. His second and final List A match for the Board came against Northamptonshire in the same competition. In 2002, Roberts joined Bedfordshire, making made his Minor Counties Championship against Cambridgeshire. During the 2002, he represented the county in 5 Championship matches, the last of which came against Suffolk, and 4 MCCA Knockout Trophy matches. He also represented Bedfordshire in 2 List A matches against Hertfordshire and the Netherlands in the 1st and 2nd rounds of the 2003 Cheltenham & Gloucester Trophy which were played in 2002.

The following season he joined Cornwall, where he made his Minor Counties Championship debut for the county against Devon. From 2003 to present, he represented the county in 20 Minor Counties Championship matches. Roberts has also represented Cornwall in the MCCA Knockout Trophy. His debut in that competition for the county came against Bedfordshire in 2004. From 2004 to present, he has represented the county in 13 Trophy matches. He has also played a single List A match for Cornwall against the Netherlands in the 1st round of the 2004 Cheltenham & Gloucester Trophy which was played in 2003. In his 5 total List A matches, he scored 97 runs at a batting average of 24.25, with a high score 40.

His cousin, Chris Bullen, has played first-class cricket for Surrey and a combined Minor Counties team, as well as List A cricket for Bedfordshire and the Surrey Cricket Board.
