= Peter Webley =

English cricketer

Personal information
- Full name: Peter John Webley
- Born: 18 July 1942; Luton, Bedfordshire, England
- Died: 26 November 2023 (aged 81); Luton, Bedfordshire, England
- Batting: Left-handed
- Bowling: Leg break, googly

Domestic team information
- Years: Team
- 1967–1975: Bedfordshire

Career statistics
| Competition | List A |
|---|---|
| Matches | 1 |
| Runs scored | 4 |
| Batting average | 4.00 |
| 100s/50s | 0/0 |
| Top score | 4 |
| Catches/stumpings | 2/– |
- Source: Cricinfo, 5 August 2011

Peter John Webley (18 July 1942 – 26 November 2023) was an English cricketer. Webley was a left-handed batsman who bowled leg breaks and the googly. He was born in Luton, Bedfordshire.

Webley made his debut for Bedfordshire against Cambridgeshire in the 1967 Minor Counties Championship. He played Minor counties cricket for Bedfordshire from 1967 to 1975, making 36 Minor Counties Championship appearances. He made his only List A appearance against Essex in the 1971 Gillette Cup. In this match, he scored 4 runs before being dismissed by John Lever, with Essex winning by 97 runs.
