= Jack Smith (sportsman) =

English cricketer & rugby union player (1936–2020)

Personal information
- Full name: Jack Smith
- Born: 7 March 1936; Stotfold, Bedfordshire, England
- Died: 7 May 2020 (aged 84)
- Batting: Right-handed
- Bowling: Right-arm off break

Domestic team information
- Years: Team
- 1959–1975: Bedfordshire
- 1965: Minor Counties
- 1973: Minor Counties South

Career statistics
| Competition | First-class | List A |
|---|---|---|
| Matches | 1 | 10 |
| Runs scored | 17 | 91 |
| Batting average | 8.50 | 15.16 |
| 100s/50s | 0/0 | 0/1 |
| Top score | 17 | 50 |
| Balls bowled | 210 | 552 |
| Wickets | 4 | 6 |
| Bowling average | 24.75 | 62.16 |
| 5 wickets in innings | 0 | 0 |
| 10 wickets in match | 0 | 0 |
| Best bowling | 2/47 | 2/41 |
| Catches/stumpings | 0/– | 1/– |
- Source: Cricinfo, 24 April 2021

Jack Smith (7 March 1936 – 7 May 2020) was an English cricketer. He was a right-handed batsman who bowled right-arm off break. He was born in Stotfold, Bedfordshire.

Smith made his debut for Bedfordshire against Cambridgeshire in the 1959 Minor Counties Championship. He played Minor Counties cricket for Bedfordshire from 1959 to 1975, making 128 Minor Counties Championship appearances. He captained Bedfordshire from 1962 to 1973, which included the only two outright titles in their history (1970 and 1972).

He made his List A debut against Northamptonshire in the 1967 Gillette Cup. He made five further List A appearances, the last of which came against Lancashire in the 1973 Gillette Cup. In his six List A matches for Bedfordshire, he scored 21 runs at an average of 7.00, with a high score of 8. With the ball, he took 5 wickets at a bowling average of 50.00, with best figures of 2/41.

He made a single first-class appearance for the Minor Counties against the touring South Africans in 1965. In this match, he took the wickets of Tiger Lance and Denis Lindsay in the South Africans first-innings, for the cost of 52 runs from 22 overs. In the South Africans second-innings he took the wickets of Lindsay and Colin Bland for the cost of 47 runs from 13 overs. The match did not yield success for him with the bat, with Smith being dismissed for a duck by Norman Crookes in the Minor Counties first-innings, while in their second-innings he was dismissed for 17 runs by Atholl McKinnon. He also made List A appearances for Minor Counties South, making his debut for the team against Hampshire in the 1973 Benson & Hedges Cup. He made three further appearances for the team in that competition, the last of which came against Glamorgan. He scored 70 runs in his four matches for the team, which came at an average of 23.33, with a high score of 50. This score came on debut against Hampshire. With the ball, he took just a single wicket in his 4 matches, which came at an overall cost of 123 runs.

Smith also played rugby for Bedford as a full-back, making 343 appearances for the club. In 1981, Smith was jailed for four years for insurance fraud.
