= George August =

English cricketer (1917–1991)

Personal information
- Full name: George Lawrence Bagley August
- Born: 16 September 1917; Mymensingh, Bengal Presidency, British Raj
- Died: 13 October 1991 (aged 74); Bedford, Bedfordshire, England
- Batting: Right-handed
- Relatives: Philip August (son)

Domestic team information
- Years: Team
- 1935–1960: Bedfordshire
- 1950–1953: Minor Counties

Career statistics
Competition	First-class
Matches	2
Runs scored	41
Batting average	10.50
100s/50s	0/0
Top score	27
Catches/stumpings	0/–
- Source: Cricinfo, 4 August 2011

George Lawrence Bagley August (16 September 1917 – 13 October 1991) was an English cricketer. August was a right-handed batsman. He was born in Mymensingh, then in the British Raj and was educated at Bedford School in England, where he played for the school cricket team.

August made his debut for Bedfordshire against Cambridgeshire in the 1935 Minor Counties Championship, playing for the county until 1939. When World War II ended county cricket, he went on to serve in the war. He left the Officers' Training Corps with the rank of 2nd Lieutenant in November 1940, with the Royal Artillery.

Following the war, he continued to play Minor counties cricket for Bedfordshire from 1946 to 1960, making a total of 92 Minor Counties Championship appearances. With Brian Disbury he set the county's record for the first-wicket twice in six days in 1947, scoring 235 against Cambridgeshire and then 246 against Buckinghamshire.

He made his first-class cricket debut for the Minor Counties against the Marylebone Cricket Club in the 1950. In this match, he scored 27 runs in the Minor Counties first-innings before being dismissed by Fred Titmus, while in their second-innings he was dismissed by Victor Ransom for 11 runs. He made a further first-class appearance for the team in 1953 against the touring Australians. He scored 3 runs in the Minor Counties first-innings, before being dismissed by Bill Johnston, while in the second-innings he was run out for a duck.

In later life, August worked as a secretary at J. Gent & Son Limited, by October 1967 he was the chairman of the company, which was by then in the process of being wound up. He also served as secretary of Bedfordshire County Cricket Club from 1969 to 1984 and as chairman of the Minor Counties Cricket Association from 1982 until 1989. He died at Bedford in Bedfordshire in October 1991. His son, Philip, also played Minor counties cricket for Bedfordshire.
