= Simon Murray (cricketer) =

English cricketer (born 1963)

Simon Murray (born 7 December 1963) was an English cricketer. He was a right-handed batsman and right-arm off-break bowler who played for Bedfordshire. He was born in Luton, Bedfordshire.

Murray, who represented Bedfordshire in the Minor Counties Championship between 1996 and 1999, made a single List A appearance for the team, in the 2000 NatWest Trophy, against Northumberland. From the lower-middle order, he scored 6 runs.
