= David Hoare =

English cricketer

Personal information
- Full name: David John Frank Hoare
- Born: 14 January 1934; West Malling, Kent
- Died: 26 February 2002 (aged 68); Bedford, Bedfordshire
- Batting: Left-handed
- Relatives: Philip Hoare (son)

Domestic team information
- Years: Team
- 1955–1971: Bedfordshire

Career statistics
Competition	List A
Matches	4
Runs scored	43
Batting average	14.33
100s/50s	0/0
Top score	34
Catches/stumpings	1/–
- Source: Cricinfo, 3 August 2011

David John Frank Hoare (14 February 1934 – 26 February 2002) was an English cricketer. Hoare was a left-handed batsman. He was born in West Malling, Kent.

Hoare made his debut for Bedfordshire against Cambridgeshire in the 1955 Minor Counties Championship. He played Minor counties cricket for Bedfordshire from 1955 to 1971, making 68 Minor Counties Championship appearances. He made his List A debut against Northamptonshire in the 1967 Gillette Cup. He made 3 further List A appearances, the last of which came against Buckinghamshire in the 1970 Gillette Cup. In his 4 List A matches, he scored 43 runs at an average of 14.33, with a high score of 34.

He died in Bedford, Bedfordshire on 26 February 2002. His son, Philip, also played for Bedfordshire.
