= Michael Morgan (Bedfordshire cricketer) =

Scottish cricket

Personal information
- Full name: Michael Morgan
- Born: 30 September 1952 (age 74); Edinburgh, Scotland
- Batting: Right-handed
- Bowling: Right-arm off break
- Relatives: Gordon Morgan (brother)

Domestic team information
- Years: Team
- 1974–1987: Bedfordshire

Career statistics
| Competition | List A |
|---|---|
| Matches | 3 |
| Runs scored | 32 |
| Batting average | 10.66 |
| 100s/50s | 0/0 |
| Top score | 13 |
| Balls bowled | 18 |
| Wickets | 0 |
| Bowling average | – |
| 5 wickets in innings | – |
| 10 wickets in match | – |
| Best bowling | – |
| Catches/stumpings | 0/– |
- Source: Cricinfo, 11 August 2011

Michael Morgan (born 30 September 1952) is a Scottish former cricketer. Morgan was a right-handed batsman who bowled right-arm off break. He was born in Edinburgh, Midlothian.

Morgan made his debut for Bedfordshire in the 1974 Minor Counties Championship against Cambridgeshire. He played Minor counties cricket for Bedfordshire from 1974 to 1987, which included 101 Minor Counties Championship appearances and 8 MCCA Knockout Trophy matches. He made his List A debut against Northumberland in the 1977 Gillette Cup. He made 2 further List A appearances, against Somerset in the 1982 NatWest Trophy and Gloucestershire in the 1985 NatWest Trophy. In his 3 List A matches, he scored 32 runs at an average of 10.66, with a high score of 13.

His brother, Gordon, played List A and Minor counties cricket for Suffolk.
