= Paul Harris (Bedfordshire cricketer) =

English cricketer (born 1955)

Paul Harris (born 21 February 1955) was an English cricketer. He was a right-handed batsman who played for Bedfordshire. He was born in Dagenham.

Harris debuted in the Minor Counties Championship in 1976, and made his sole List A appearance in the Gillette Cup competition of 1977, in a match which Bedfordshire lost by nine wickets.

Harris continued to represent Bedfordshire in the Minor Counties Championship until 1980.
