= Colin Tibbett =

English cricketer (born 1951)

Personal information
- Full name: Colin John Tibbett
- Born: 18 March 1951 (age 75); Luton, Bedfordshire, England
- Batting: Right-handed

Domestic team information
- Years: Team
- 1979: Minor Counties South
- 1971–1979: Bedfordshire

Career statistics
Competition	List A
Matches	1
Runs scored	1
Batting average	1.00
100s/50s	–/–
Top score	1
Balls bowled	–
Wickets	–
Bowling average	–
5 wickets in innings	–
10 wickets in match	–
Best bowling	–
Catches/stumpings	–/–
- Source: Cricinfo, 9 July 2012

Colin John Tibbett (born 18 March 1951) is a former English cricketer. Tibbett was a right-handed batsman. He was born at Luton, Bedfordshire.

Tibbett made his debut for Bedfordshire against Shropshire in the 1971 Minor Counties Championship. He played minor counties cricket for Bedfordshire from 1971 to 1979, making eighteen appearances, the last of which came against Suffolk in the 1979 Minor Counties Championship. In 1979, he was selected to play for Minor Counties South in the Benson & Hedges Cup, making a single List A appearance against Worcestershire at London Road, High Wycombe. Worcestershire won the toss and elected to bat, making 197/9 in their 55 overs. Minor Counties South were then dismissed for just 94 in their innings, with Rudd making a single run before he was dismissed by Norman Gifford.
