= Mark Patterson (Irish cricketer) =

Irish cricketer

Personal information
- Full name: Mark William Patterson
- Born: 2 February 1974 (age 52); Belfast, Northern Ireland
- Batting: Right-handed
- Bowling: Right-arm fast-medium
- Relatives: Andrew Patterson (brother)

International information
- National side: Ireland

Domestic team information
- Years: Team
- 1995—1996: Ireland
- 1996—1999: Surrey
- 2002—2005: Bedfordshire

Career statistics
Competition	First-class	List A
Matches	2	13
Runs scored	6	25
Batting average	2.00	3.57
100s/50s	0/0	0/0
Top score	4	9
Balls bowled	243	663
Wickets	10	20
Bowling average	16.30	33.05
5 wickets in innings	1	0
10 wickets in match	0	0
Best bowling	6/80	3/39
Catches/stumpings	0/—	4/—
- Source: Cricinfo, 29 September 2011

Mark William Patterson (born 2 February 1974) is a former Northern Irish cricketer. Patterson was a right-handed batsman who bowls right-arm fast-medium. He was born in Belfast, Northern Ireland.

Patterson made his List A debut for Ireland against Sussex in the 1995 Benson & Hedges Cup. He made eight further List A appearances for Ireland, the last of which came against Sussex in the 1996 NatWest Trophy. Patterson took 14 wickets in List A cricket for Ireland, which came at an average of 34.57, with best figures of 3/48. While playing against Surrey in the 1996 Benson & Hedges Cup at Woodvale Road, he impressed enough for Surrey to invite him over to England for a trial. He made his debut for Surrey in August 1996 in a first-class match against South Africa A. On debut he took figures of 6/80, which were at the time the best bowling figures for a Surrey player on debut. He spent much of the next couple of seasons playing for the Surrey Second XI, as well as playing in the MCCA Knockout Trophy for the Surrey Cricket Board.

During this time he played for Northern Ireland in the cricket tournament at the 1998 Commonwealth Games, making a single List A appearance during it against Barbados, claiming the wicket of Adrian Griffith as Barbados ran out winners by 176 runs. He later made his second and final first-class appearance for Surrey in the 1999 County Championship against Nottinghamshire. In his two first-class matches, he claimed a total of 10 wickets at an average of 16.30. Patterson also made fifteen ICC Trophy matches for Ireland between 1997 and 2001. In 2002, he joined Bedfordshire, making his debut for the county in the MCCA Knockout Trophy against Cambridgeshire. He played Minor counties cricket for Bedfordshire from 2002 to 2005, making 22 Minor Counties Championship and nine MCCA Knockout Trophy appearances. He played his first List A match for the county in the 1st round of the 2003 Cheltenham & Gloucester Trophy against Hertfordshire, which Bedfordshire won, with Patterson following this up by playing in the 2nd round against the Netherlands, which Bedfordshire also won. Both matches were played in 2002. His final List A appearance for Bedfordshire came against Sussex in the 2005 Cheltenham & Gloucester Trophy. In his three List A appearances for the county, he took 5 wickets at an average of 22.00, with best figures of 3/39.

His brother, Andrew, was also a first-class cricketer and played for Ireland.
