= James Steadman =

English cricketer (born 1983)

James Malcolm Steadman (born 15 February 1983) is an English cricketer who played for Bedfordshire County Cricket Club in four List A games.
