= Peter Bichener =

English cricketer

Peter Bichener (born 22 February 1941) is an English former cricketer. He was a right-handed batsman and a right-arm medium-pace bowler who played for Bedfordshire. He was born in Bedford.

Having represented the team in the Minor Counties Championship between 1968 and 1971, Bichener made a single List A appearance for the team, during the 1971 Gillette Cup, against Essex, in a match which Bedfordshire lost by a 97-run margin. Bichener took two wickets in the match, including that of Brian Ward.

== See also ==
- Minor Counties Cricket Championship
