= Peter Thomas (cricketer, born 1964) =

English cricketer (born 1964)

Personal information
- Full name: Peter Dylan Thomas
- Born: 22 August 1964 (age 62); Willesden, Middlesex, England
- Batting: Right-handed
- Bowling: Right-arm off break

Domestic team information
- Years: Team
- 1990–1995: Bedfordshire

Career statistics
Competition	List A
Matches	2
Runs scored	8
Batting average	4.00
100s/50s	0/0
Top score	4
Balls bowled	72
Wickets	1
Bowling average	71.00
5 wickets in innings	0
10 wickets in match	0
Best bowling	1/71
Catches/stumpings	0/–
- Source: Cricinfo, 29 May 2011

Peter Dylan Thomas (born 22 August 1964) is a former English cricketer. Thomas was a right-handed batsman who bowled right-arm off break. He was born in Willesden, Middlesex.

Thomas made his debut for Bedfordshire in the 1990 Minor Counties Championship against Cambridgeshire. He played Minor counties cricket for Bedfordshire from 1990 to 1995, which included 15 Minor Counties Championship matches and 6 MCCA Knockout Trophy matches. He made his List A debut against Worcestershire in the 1991 NatWest Trophy. In this match, he scored 4 runs before being dismissed by Richard Illingworth. He played a further List A match against Warwickshire in the 1994 NatWest Trophy. In this match, he scored 4 runs before being dismissed by Roger Twose. With the ball, he took the wicket of Dominic Ostler, for the cost of 71 runs from 12 overs.
