= Stephen Watts (cricketer) =

English cricketer (born 1979)

Personal information
- Full name: Stephen John Watts
- Born: 1 May 1979 (age 47); Luton, Bedfordshire
- Batting: Right-handed
- Bowling: Right-arm off break

Domestic team information
- Years: Team
- 2001–2006: Bedfordshire

Career statistics
Competition	List A
Matches	2
Runs scored	7
Batting average	–
100s/50s	0/0
Top score	4*
Balls bowled	54
Wickets	0
Bowling average	–
5 wickets in innings	–
10 wickets in match	–
Best bowling	–
Catches/stumpings	0/–
- Source: Cricinfo, 28 May 2011

Stephen John Watts (born 1 May 1979) is a former English cricketer. Watts was a right-handed batsman who bowled right-arm off break. He was born in Luton, Bedfordshire.

Watts made his debut for Bedfordshire in the 2001 Minor Counties Championship against Staffordshire. Watts played Minor counties cricket for Bedfordshire from 2001 to 2006, which included 22 Minor Counties Championship matches and 7 MCCA Knockout Trophy matches. He made his List A debut against Cheshire in the 1st round of the 2004 Cheltenham & Gloucester Trophy which was held in 2003. In this match, he scored an unbeaten 4 runs and bowled 4 wicket-less overs. He played a further List A match for Bedfordshire, in the 2005 Cheltenham & Gloucester Trophy against Sussex. In this match, he scored an unbeaten 3 runs. With the ball, he bowled 5 wicket-less overs.
