= Christopher Proudman =

English cricketer

Christopher Proudman (born 30 June 1952 (age 72)) was an English cricketer. He was a right-handed batsman and a left-arm medium-pace bowler who played for Bedfordshire. He was born in Oakham, Rutland.

Proudman made his debut for Bedfordshire in 1984, and played in the first round of the English Estates Trophy competition in the same year.

Appearing steadily in the Minor Counties Championship for the team between 1984 and 1986, Proudman's only List A appearance came in the NatWest Trophy competition of 1985. Batting in the tailend, he scored 14 not out, though it was not enough to save Bedfordshire from a heavy defeat. He bowled twelve overs in the match, conceding 40 runs.
