= Peter Taylor (English cricketer) =

English cricketer

Peter Michael Taylor (born 11 December 1942) was an English cricketer. He was a left-handed batsman who played for Bedfordshire. He was born in Cranfield, Bedfordshire.

Taylor made a single List A appearance for the team, during the 1967 Gillette Cup, against Northamptonshire. Alongside former England Test player Geoff Millman in the opening order, Taylor scored 25 runs, as Bedfordshire exited the competition in the first round.
