= Thomas Beck (cricketer) =

English cricketer

Tom William Hamilton Beck (1936 – 8 August 2008) was an English cricketer who played for Bedfordshire.

Beck made a single List A appearance for the side, during the 1970 season, against Buckinghamshire. From the tailend, he scored 0 not out. He bowled 6 overs in the match, conceding 23 runs.
