= David Light (cricketer) =

English cricketer

Personal information
- Full name: David Graham Light
- Born: 2 March 1944 (age 82); Luton, Bedfordshire, England
- Batting: Right-handed

Domestic team information
- Years: Team
- 1974: Minor Counties South
- 1968–1976: Bedfordshire

Career statistics
Competition	List A
Matches	1
Runs scored	6
Batting average	6.00
100s/50s	–/–
Top score	6
Balls bowled	–
Wickets	–
Bowling average	–
5 wickets in innings	–
10 wickets in match	–
Best bowling	–
Catches/stumpings	–/–
- Source: Cricinfo, 26 May 2012

David Graham Light (born 2 March 1944) is a former English cricketer. Light was a right-handed batsman. He was born at Luton, Bedfordshire.

Light made his debut for Bedfordshire against Hertfordshire in the 1968 Minor Counties Championship. He played minor counties cricket for Bedfordshire from 1968 to 1976, making a total of 32 appearances, the last of which came against Cambridgeshire. In 1974, he made a single List A appearance for Minor Counties South against Glamorgan at Shardeloes, Amersham, in the Benson & Hedges Cup. Glamorgan batted first, making 123 all out from 53.2 overs. Chasing that total, Minor Counties South were dismissed for 89, with Light being dismissed for 6 runs by Malcolm Nash.
