= David Daniels (cricketer) =

English cricketer (born 1942)

Personal information
- Full name: David Michael Daniels
- Born: 29 March 1942 (age 84); Bexleyheath, Kent, England
- Batting: Right-handed

Domestic team information
- Years: Team
- 1964–1965: Cambridge University
- 1966–1975: Dorset
- 1972: Minor Counties South
- 1976–1983: Bedfordshire
- 1977: Minor Counties West

Career statistics
Competition	FC	LA
Matches	18	11
Runs scored	562	126
Batting average	17.56	11.45
100s/50s	0/3	0/0
Top score	82	26
Balls bowled	6	3
Wickets	0	0
Bowling average	–	–
5 wickets in innings	–	–
10 wickets in match	–	–
Best bowling	–	–
Catches/stumpings	7/–	4/–
- Source: Cricinfo, 22 March 2010

David Michael Daniels (born 29 March 1942) is a former English first-class cricketer. A right-handed batsman, he made his first-class debut for Cambridge University in 1964 against the touring Australians. From 1964 to 1965, he represented Cambridge University in 18 first-class matches, with his final match for the university coming against Oxford University. In his 18 first-class matches for the university he scored 562 runs at a batting average of 17.56, with 3 half centuries and a high score of 82 against Worcestershire in 1964.

Daniels made his debut for Dorset in the 1966 Minor Counties Championship against Cornwall. He represented Dorset in 77 Minor Counties Championship matches from 1966 to 1975, with his final Minor Counties match for the county coming against Shropshire. In 1968, he played his only List-A match for Dorset against Bedfordshire in the 1968 Gillette Cup.

In 1972, Daniels made his List-A debut for the Minor Counties South against Somerset in the 1972 Benson and Hedges Cup, where he played 4 matches for the team during that competition, with his final match for the team coming against Gloucestershire.

Daniels made his debut for Bedfordshire in the Minor Counties Championship against Cambridgeshire in 1976. He represented Bedfordshire in 102 Minor County matches from 1976 to 1983, with his final Minor Counties match for Bedfordshire coming against Suffolk. In 1977 he made his List-A debut for the county in the 1st round of the 1977 Gillette Cup against Northumberland.

Daniels also represented the Minor Counties West in the 1977 Benson and Hedges Cup, where he made his debut for the team against Derbyshire. Daniels played 4 matches for the team in the competition, with his final match coming against Worcestershire.

In 1982, Daniels played his final List-A match for Bedfordshire against Somerset in the 1st round of the 1982 NatWest Trophy.
