= Richard White (cricketer) =

English cricketer (1934–2006)

Richard Howard White (27 April 1934 – 29 August 2006) was an English cricketer. He was a right-handed batsman and a right-arm medium-fast bowler who played for Bedfordshire. He was born in Carlton.

White made a single List A appearance for the team, against Northamptonshire during the 1967 Gillette Cup competition. From the tailend, White scored a duck in the only innings in which he batted. Bowling twelve overs in the match, he took figures of 1/41.
