= Barry Robinson (cricketer) =

English cricketer (1932–2019)

Personal information
- Full name: Barry David Robinson
- Born: 22 February 1932; Luton, Bedfordshire
- Died: 16 January 2019 (aged 86)
- Batting: Right-handed

Domestic team information
- Years: Team
- 1957–1973: Bedfordshire

Career statistics
Competition	List A
Matches	2
Runs scored	8
Batting average	8.00
100s/50s	0/0
Top score	8
Catches/stumpings	0/–
- Source: Cricinfo, 2 August 2011

Barry David Robinson (22 February 1932 – 16 January 2019) was an English cricketer. Robinson was a right-handed batsman. He was born in Luton, Bedfordshire.

Robinson made his debut for Bedfordshire against Cambridgeshire in the 1957 Minor Counties Championship. He played Minor counties cricket for Bedfordshire from 1957 to 1973, making 72 Minor Counties Championship appearances. He made his List A debut against Dorset in the 1968 Gillette Cup. In this match he wasn't required to bat, with Dorset winning by 8 wickets. He made a further List A appearance in the 2nd round of the same competition against Hampshire. He scored 8 runs in this match, before being dismissed by Butch White. Bedfordshire lost by 124 runs.
