= 1973 Benson & Hedges Cup =

- Administrator(s): Test and County Cricket Board
- Cricket format: Limited overs cricket (55 overs per innings)
- Champions: Kent (1st title)
- Participants: 20
- Matches: 47
- Most runs: 335 Ron Headley (Worcestershire)
- Most wickets: 18 Norman Gifford (Worcestershire)

The 1973 Benson & Hedges Cup was the second edition of cricket's Benson & Hedges Cup. The competition was won by Kent County Cricket Club.

== Fixtures and results ==
=== Group stage ===
==== Midlands Group ====
Team	Pld	W	L	Pts	BowSR
Leicestershire	4	3	1	9	34.158
Worcestershire	4	3	1	9	38.182
Warwickshire	4	2	2	6	37.636
Oxford University	4	1	3	3	42.607
Northamptonshire	4	1	3	3	43.375

==== Northern Group ====
Team	Pld	W	L	Pts	BowSR
Lancashire	4	3	1	9	38.515
Nottinghamshire	4	3	1	9	43.276
Yorkshire	4	3	1	9	52.625
Derbyshire	4	1	3	3	39.800
Minor Counties North	4	0	4	0	73.812

==== Southern Group ====
Team	Pld	W	L	Pts	BowSR
Kent	4	3	1	9	35.833
Essex	4	2	2	6	34.459
Surrey	4	2	2	6	41.094
Sussex	4	2	2	6	46.958
Middlesex	4	1	3	3	60.263

==== Western Group ====
Team	Pld	W	L	Pts	BowSR
Glamorgan	4	3	1	9	33.588
Hampshire	4	3	1	9	34.703
Somerset	4	2	2	6	38.706
Gloucestershire	4	2	2	6	41.200
Minor Counties South	4	0	4	0	104.100

=== Quarter-finals ===
13 June 1973
(scorecard)

Leicestershire; 177/8 (55 overs)	v	Essex; 180/4 (45.5 overs)
Chris Balderstone 58; Brian Edmeades 5/22 (11 overs)		Bob Cooke 50 * Ken Higgs 2/21 (11 overs)

Essex won by 6 wickets
Valentines Park, Ilford
Umpires: Bill Alley & Dickie Bird
Player of the match: Brian Edmeades (Essex)

13 June 1973
(scorecard)

Kent; 206 all out (55 overs)	v	Hampshire; 195 all out (53.4 overs)
Asif Iqbal 54; Bob Herman 2/33 (11 overs)		Richard Gilliat 55; Norman Graham 3/45 (10.4 overs)

Kent won by 11 runs
County Ground, Southampton
Umpires: Barry Meyer & Eddie Phillipson
Player of the match: Richard Gilliat (Hampshire)

13 June 1973
(scorecard)

Lancashire; 227/5 (55 overs)	v	Glamorgan; 68 all out (36.5 overs)
Harry Pilling 109*; Lawrence Williams 2/63 (11 overs)		Tony Lewis 13; Jack Simmons 3/5 (3.5 overs)

Lancashire won by 159 runs
Old Trafford, Manchester
Umpires: Ray Julian & Cec Pepper
Player of the match: Harry Pilling (Lancashire)

13 June 1973
(scorecard)

Worcestershire; 234/8 (55 overs)	v	Nottinghamshire; 145/8 (55 overs)
Ron Headley 84; Barry Stead 3/49 (11 overs)		Bob White 52*; Vanburn Holder 2/9 (9 overs)

Worcestershire won by 89 runs
New Road, Worcester
Umpires: David Evans & Arthur Fagg
Player of the match: Ron Headley (Worcestershire)

=== Semi-finals ===
27 June 1973
(scorecard)

Kent; 169/9 (55 overs)	v	Essex; 123 all out (44 overs)
Alan Ealham 48; Ray East 4/26 (11 overs)		Bruce Francis 33; John Shepherd 3/21 (7 overs)

Kent won by 46 runs
St Lawrence Ground, Canterbury
Umpires: Dickie Bird & Peter Wight
Player of the match: Alan Ealham (Kent)

27 June 1973
(scorecard)

Lancashire; 159 all out (55 overs)	v	Worcestershire; 159/9 (55 overs)
Harry Pilling 40; Norman Gifford 5/42 (11 overs)		Basil D'Oliveira 29; Peter Lee 4/32 (11 overs)

Worcestershire won by losing fewer wickets
Old Trafford, Manchester
Umpires: David Constant & Arthur Jepson
Player of the match: Norman Gifford (Worcestershire)

=== Final ===
21 July 1973
(scorecard)

Kent; 225/7 (55 overs)	v	Worcestershire; 186 all out (51.4 overs)
Brian Luckhurst 79; Brian Brain 1/26 (11 overs)		Basil D'Oliveira 47; Asif Iqbal 4/43 (11 overs)

Kent won by 39 runs
Lord's, London
Umpires: Charlie Elliott & Dusty Rhodes
Player of the match: Asif Iqbal (Kent)

== See also ==
Benson & Hedges Cup
