= List of Minor Counties cricketers =

The Minor Counties played in First-class cricket matches between 1912 and 1994 and List A cricket matches between 1980 and 1998. This is a list of the players who appeared in those matches.

== A ==
- John Abrahams (1974): J Abrahams
- Nick Adams (1993): NJ Adams
- Charles Adamson (1934): CL Adamson
- Jonathan Addison (1988): JP Addison
- Tony Allin (1980–1981): AW Allin
- Francis Appleyard (1939): F Appleyard
- Keith Arnold (1985–1995): KA Arnold
- Derek Ashley (1986): DJ Ashley
- Colin Atkinson (1959): CRM Atkinson
- Steve Atkinson (1985–1989): SR Atkinson
- John Aubrey-Fletcher (1933): JHL Aubrey-Fletcher
- George August (1950–1953): GLB August
- Charles Awdry (1937): CE Awdry

== B ==
- David Bailey (1973–1984): D Bailey
- Frederick Bailey (1950–1960): FR Bailey
- John Bailey (1967–1969): HJ Bailey
- Leslie Baker (1939): LG Baker
- Jack Bannister (1950): JD Bannister
- Andy Barnard (1985): AS Barnard
- Sydney Barnes (1929): SF Barnes
- Ben Barnett (1953): BA Barnett
- Terry Barwell (1973): TI Barwell
- Jonathan Batty (1996): JN Batty
- Walter Beadsmoore (1924): WA Beadsmoore
- Fred Beattie (1930–1933): FD Beattie
- Brian Belle (1949–1950): BH Belle
- Herbert Benka (1937): HF Benka
- Montague Bennett (1935): MV Bennett
- Fred Berry (1938): F Berry
- Bob Berry (1949): R Berry
- Gilbert Betts (1951): GF Betts
- Jack Birkenshaw (1959–1960): J Birkenshaw
- Raymond Bond (1973): RE Bond
- Arthur Booth (1936–1938): A Booth
- Edmund Bourne (1912): EH Bourne
- Peter Bradley (1973–1974): P Bradley
- Brian Brain (1982): BM Brain
- Alan Brazier (1950): AF Brazier
- Horace Brearley (1937): H Brearley
- William Brindley (1930–1935): WT Brindley
- Richard Brooke (1933–1935): RHJ Brooke
- Henry Brougham (1912): H Brougham
- Gary Brown (1989–1991): GK Brown
- Chris Bullen (1994): CK Bullen
- Rodney Bunting (1987): RA Bunting
- Graham Burgess (1981–1982): GI Burgess
- Paul Burn (1990): P Burn
- Alan Burridge (1973): AJ Burridge
- Stephen Burrow (1988): S Burrow
- Frederick Burton (1924): FA Burton
- Roger Busby (1987–1988): RN Busby
- George Butler (1930–1939): GS Butler
- Henry Butterworth (1935–1937): HRW Butterworth

== C ==
- Lance Cairns (1980–1981): BL Cairns
- Graeme Calway (1992): GS Calway
- George Carnegie-Brown (1937): G Carnegie-Brown
- Percy Chapman (1924): APF Chapman
- Raleigh Chichester-Constable (1935): RCJ Chichester-Constable
- Arthur Childs-Clarke (1936–1937): AW Childs-Clarke
- Tom Clark (1949): TH Clark
- John Alan Claughton (1983): JA Claughton
- Simon Clements (1983): SM Clements
- Ian Cockbain (1993–1997): I Cockbain
- John Cockett (1953): JA Cockett
- John Coldham (1924): JM Coldham
- Derek Cole (1959–1967): DH Cole
- Brian Collins (1979–1981): BG Collins
- Roy Collins (1960): R Collins
- Francis Collyer (1973–1984): FE Collyer
- Geoffrey Colman (1924): GRR Colman
- Ian Conn (1989–1992): IE Conn
- William Cook (1928–1931): WT Cook
- Bob Cooke (1972–1976): RMO Cooke
- Arthur Coomb (1951–1953): AG Coomb
- Howard Cooper (1972): HP Cooper
- Cyril Coote (1935–1936): CE Coote
- Geof Courtenay (1953): GWL Courtenay
- Reginald Covill (1933): RJ Covill
- Roger Cox (1971): R Cox
- Ian Craig (1959): IT Craig
- Henry Crouch (1935): HR Crouch
- Maurice Crouch (1951): MA Crouch

== D ==
- Richard Dalton (1997–1998): RN Dalton
- Tony Davis (1967): AT Davis
- Simon Davis (1982–1983): SP Davis
- Steven Dean (1992–1998): SJ Dean
- Frank Dennis (1936–1939): F Dennis
- John Derrick (1993): J Derrick
- Fredrick de Saram (1936): FC de Saram
- Buck Divecha (1950): RV Divecha
- Tom Dobson (1929–1934): TK Dobson
- Harold Dods (1936–1938): HW Dods
- Graham Doggart (1924): AG Doggart
- Tom Dollery (1933): HE Dollery
- Richard Downend (1972): RH Downend
- Paul Dunkels (1971): PR Dunkels
- Ronald Dutton (1936–1937): RM Dutton
- Ernest Dynes (1928–1930): ED Dynes

== E ==
- Ken Earl (1950): KJ Earl
- Giles Ecclestone (1997): GW Ecclestone
- Cyril Edge (1939): CA Edge
- Brian Edrich (1967): BR Edrich
- Eric Edrich (1938): EH Edrich
- Bill Edrich (1934–1936): WJ Edrich
- Frank Edwards (1924–1933): F Edwards
- Stephen Edwards (1988): SJ Edwards
- Richard Eglington (1939): R Eglington
- Merrick Elderton (1931): MB Elderton
- Harold Elsdon (1949): H Elsdon
- Robert Entwistle (1976): R Entwistle
- Brian Evans (1969): JB Evans
- Rupert Evans (1988–1995): RA Evans
- Russell Evans (1994–1996): RJ Evans

== F ==
- Michael Falcon (1924): M Falcon
- Bill Farrimond (1929–1934): W Farrimond
- Mark Fell (1986–1998): MA Fell
- Robert Felton (1937): R Felton
- Jonathan Fielding (1997–1998): JM Fielding
- Jack Firth (1950): J Firth
- Russell Flower (1982): RW Flower
- Nick Folland (1989–1992): NA Folland
- Cecil Ford (1936): CW Ford
- Cyril Fordham (1931–1937): CB Fordham
- Andrew Fothergill (1989–1991): AR Fothergill
- Walter Franklin (1924–1937): WB Franklin
- Ray Frearson (1929–1931): RE Frearson

== G ==
- Phillip Garner (1985): PJ Garner
- Mike Garnham (1987–1988): MA Garnham
- Nick Gaywood (1993–1998): NR Gaywood
- Ian Gemmell (1981–1982): IJ Gemmell
- Paul Gibb (1935–1936): PA Gibb
- Humphrey Gilbert (1912): HA Gilbert
- Peter Gill (1976–1979): PN Gill
- Steve Goldsmith (1995–1998): SC Goldsmith
- Peter Graham (1985–1994): PC Graham
- Russell Green (1987–1991): RC Green
- Stephen Greensword (1973–1992): S Greensword
- Alan Griffiths (1981–1985): A Griffiths

== H ==
- Nigel Hackett (1992): NP Hackett
- Robert Hailey (1982): RJ Hailey
- David Hale (1989): DA Hale
- Terry Hale (1965): TS Hale
- John Halliday (1934): JG Halliday
- Quorn Handley (1985): FLQ Handley
- Don Hardy (1965): DW Hardy
- Herbert Hargreaves (1937): HS Hargreaves
- Dick Harrison (1912): R Harrison
- Frank Hartley (1930): F Hartley
- Jim Hastie (1951): JH Hastie
- Richard Hayward (1979–1984): RE Hayward
- Wyndham Hazelton (1924–1929): EW Hazelton
- Jack Amory (1928): J Heathcoat-Amory
- Leonard Hemming (1951): LEG Hemming
- Steve Henderson (1987–1988): SP Henderson
- David Henley-Welch (1949): DF Henley-Welch
- Reuben Herbert (1985–1987): R Herbert
- George Hickman (1935): G Hickman
- Edward Highton (1950): EFW Highton
- Richard Hignett (1995–1998): RG Hignett
- Peter Higson (1933): P Higson
- Harold Hinde (1924): HM Hinde
- John Hitchmough (1985–1986): JS Hitchmough
- Herbert Hodgson (1924–1929): HW Hodgson
- Vanburn Holder (1981): VA Holder
- Basil Hollington (1972): HB Hollington
- Herbert Homer (1928–1931): HWF Homer
- Leonard Horridge (1928–1930): L Horridge
- Roger Hosen (1965): RW Hosen
- Barry Howard (1950): BJ Howard
- Albert Howell (1929): AL Howell
- Reginald Hudson (1933): REH Hudson
- Mark Humphries (1992–1995): MI Humphries
- Geoff Hunter (1971): CMG Hunter

== I ==
- Jack Ikin (1938–1960): JT Ikin
- Michael Ikin (1972–1979): MJ Ikin
- Will Inge (1930): WW Inge
- Russell Inglis (1965–1969): R Inglis
- Philip Irwin (1924): PH Irwin

== J ==
- Michael James (1959): RM James
- Graham Jarrett (1971–1974): GM Jarrett
- Richard Jefferson (1969): RI Jefferson
- David Johns (1953): DFV Johns
- Alec Johnson (1974): AA Johnson
- Steve Johnson (1979–1980): JS Johnson
- Peter Johnson (1979–1982): PD Johnson
- Andrew Jones (1998): AJ Jones
- Keith Jones (1976): KV Jones
- Leslie Jones (1937): LN Jones

== K ==
- Kafeel Jahangir (1995): Kafeel Jahangir
- Jackie Keeler (1953): JG Keeler
- Geoffrey Keighley (1950–1951): WG Keighley
- Andrew Kennedy (1983): A Kennedy
- Roy Kerslake (1974–1976): RC Kerslake
- Patrick Kingsley (1931): PGT Kingsley
- Roger Knight (1988): RDV Knight

== L ==
- Bill Laidlaw (1950): WK Laidlaw
- David Laitt (1959–1960): DJ Laitt
- Robert Lanchbury (1985): RJ Lanchbury
- George Langdale (1953): GR Langdale
- Wayne Larkins (1997): W Larkins
- Stewart Laudat (1996–1997): SV Laudat
- William Lawry (1965–1969): WJ Lawry
- Charles Lee (1953): C Lee
- Horace Lee (1936–1937): HC Lee
- Philip Le Gros (1924): PW Le Gros
- Timothy Lester (1990): TA Lester
- Colin Lever (1965): C Lever
- Peter Lever (1965): P Lever
- Hopper Levett (1933–1938): WHV Levett
- Richard Lewis (1979–1983): RV Lewis
- Bert Lock (1931–1935): HC Lock
- Aaron Lockett (1928–1929): A Lockett
- Ian Lomax (1960): IR Lomax
- Jim Love (1991–1992): JD Love
- William Lovell-Hewitt (1938–1939): W Lovell-Hewitt
- Vic Lund (1937): EV Lund

== M ==
- Andy Mack (1990–1991): AJ Mack
- Billy Mackay (1929): WG MacKay
- Steve Malone (1986): SJ Malone
- Tony Marshall (1967): AG Marshall
- Marcus Marvell (1996): MJ Marvell
- Martin Maslin (1967–1974): M Maslin
- Doug Mattocks (1985): DE Mattocks
- Thomas Maxwell (1937–1938): TSACJ Maxwell
- Barney McCall (1937): BEW McCall
- Norman McVicker (1965–1967): NM McVicker
- Bernard Meakin (1912): B Meakin
- Jack Mendl (1949): JF Mendl
- Ian Mercer (1965): IP Mercer
- John Merrall (1934): JE Merrall
- Bill Merry (1984–1987): WG Merry
- Jack Meyer (1924–1929): RJO Meyer
- Harold Miles (1928): HP Miles
- Geoff Miller (1993): G Miller
- Frederick Millett (1960–1973): FW Millett
- George Milne (1912): GT Milne
- Gerald Mobey (1937–1939): GS Mobey
- Timur Mohamed (1980): T Mohamed
- Ian Moore (1973): HI Moore
- Nigel Moore (1960): NH Moore
- Alf Morris (1912): A Morris
- Mudassar Nazar (1985): Mudassar Nazar
- Tony Murphy (1986–1997): AJ Murphy
- Simon Myles (1994–1996): SD Myles

== N ==
- Ted Nash (1936–1937): EM Nash
- Nasim-ul-Ghani (1972): Nasim-ul-Ghani
- Paul Newman (1992–1998): PG Newman
- Derek Nicholls (1982): DG Nicholls
- John Nichols (1912): JE Nichols
- Philip Nicholson (1997–1998): PJ Nicholson
- Mike Nurton (1982): MD Nurton
- Albert Nutter (1937): AE Nutter

== O ==
- Simon Oakes (1997–1998): S Oakes
- Neil O'Brien (1979–1989): NT O'Brien
- Steve Ogrizovic (1984): S Ogrizovic
- John Oliver (1951): JAR Oliver
- Philip Oliver (1988–1989): PR Oliver
- Jack Ord (1934): JD Ord
- Wayne Osman (1982–1985): WM Osman
- David Ottley (1985): DG Ottley
- Joseph Owen (1950–1951): JG Owen
- Norman Owen (1951): NW Owen

== P ==
- Edgar Page (1924): EW Page
- Reginald Parkin (1939): RH Parkin
- Alan Parnaby (1939): AH Parnaby
- David Parsons (1981): DJ Parsons
- Ashok Patel (1986): AS Patel
- Kenneth Pearson (1976): K Pearson
- Guy Pedder (1924): GR Pedder
- David Pennett (1998): DB Pennett
- Cyril Perkins (1951): GC Perkins
- Christopher Pickett (1953): CA Pickett
- Harry Pitchford (1928): H Pitchford
- Stephen Plumb (1980–1992): SG Plumb
- Ian Pont (1983): IL Pont
- Arthur Poole (1936): AB Poole
- Hugh Porter (1935): HL Porter
- Laurie Potter (1995–1998): L Potter
- Adam Powell (1949–1951): AG Powell
- Mark Powell (1996): MG Powell
- Charles Poynder (1937): CEH Poynder
- Neil Priestley (1986–1989): N Priestley
- Ian Prior (1967): ID Prior
- Bill Proud (1950): RB Proud
- Frank Putner (1935): FW Putner

== R ==
- Neal Radford (1997): NV Radford
- Vezey Raffety (1931): CV Raffety
- Alan Ramage (1984): A Ramage
- Frederick Rawlins (1930–1934): F Rawlins
- Bob Relf (1928–1933): RR Relf
- Peter Remnant (1929): PF Remnant
- Lord Remnant (1931–1936): RJF Remnant
- Alan Richardson (1998): A Richardson
- Norman Riches (1912): NVH Riches
- Giles Ridley (1971–1972): GNS Ridley
- Andrew Roberts (1998): AR Roberts
- Edward Allen Roberts (1936–1939): EA Roberts
- Malcolm Roberts (1990–1995): MJ Roberts
- Geoff Robinson (1971–1972): G Robinson
- Matthew Robinson (1996): MFD Robinson
- Harry Robson (1939): H Robson
- Carl Rogers (1998): CJ Rogers
- George Rogers (1939): GH Rogers
- Graham Roope (1985–1988): GRJ Roope
- Basil Rought-Rought (1937–1938): BW Rought-Rought
- Desmond Rought-Rought (1935–1939): DC Rought-Rought
- Ronald Rutter (1929–1936): RH Rutter

== S ==
- Martin Saggers (1996): MJ Saggers
- Graham Saville (1969): GJ Saville
- Michael Scothern (1995): MG Scothern
- Edward Scott (1949): EK Scott
- Tim Scriven (1994): TJA Scriven
- Bertie Shardlow (1949–1950): B Shardlow
- Kevin Sharp (1994–1996): K Sharp
- Marcus Sharp (1995–1998): MA Sharp
- Steven Sharp (1990): S Sharp
- Philip Sharpe (1959–1960): PJ Sharpe
- Zaheer Sher (1996): ZA Sher
- Tony Shippey (1969–1971): PA Shippey
- William Sime (1929–1934): WA Sime
- Robert Simons (1959): RG Simons
- Graham Skinner (1933): AG Skinner
- Tony Smith (1993–1994): AC Smith
- Tony Smith (1965): AM Smith
- Jim Smith (1930): CIJ Smith
- Clifford Smith (1937): CJ Smith
- Jack Smith (1965): J Smith
- Joseph Smith (1982): JA Smith
- Neil Smith (1972): N Smith
- Roy Smith (1949): R Smith
- Tim Smith (1984–1985): TS Smith
- Bill Smith (1935–1936): WA Smith
- Ken Snellgrove (1969): KL Snellgrove
- Stan Squires (1930): HS Squires
- Geoffrey Stevens (1912–1924): GA Stevens
- Christopher Stockdale (1988–1989): CJ Stockdale
- Dennis Stokes (1937–1938): DW Stokes
- Eric Stroud (1930): EG Stroud
- Leonard Summers (1933): LSH Summers
- David Surridge (1983–1986): D Surridge
- Stuart Surridge (1939): WS Surridge
- Billy Sutcliffe (1950): WHH Sutcliffe
- Arthur Sutton (1969–1972): JA Sutton
- Jamie Sylvester (1996–1997): JPJ Sylvester

== T ==
- Frederick Taylor (1953): F Taylor
- Harold Taylor (1939): HWF Taylor
- Malcolm Taylor (1929): ML Taylor
- Neil Taylor (1989–1992): NR Taylor
- Bob Taylor (1960): RW Taylor
- Timothy Taylor (1981): TJ Taylor
- Harold Theobald (1938): HE Theobald
- David Thomas (1990–1995): DR Thomas
- Henry Tilly (1967): HW Tilly
- Peter Timmis (1971): PJ Timmis
- Charles Titchmarsh (1924): CH Titchmarsh
- Paul Todd (1986–1987): PA Todd
- Jeffrey Tolchard (1980–1983): JG Tolchard
- David Townsend (1935–1937): DCH Townsend
- Gareth Townsend (1996): GTJ Townsend
- Cyril Turner (1935): C Turner
- David Turner (1991): DR Turner
- John Turner (1974): JB Turner
- Stuart Turner (1988): S Turner

== V ==
- David Varey (1988): DW Varey

== W ==
- Charlie Walters (1930–1934): C Walters
- David Ward (1998): DM Ward
- Reginald Ward (1931): RV Ward
- Tony Warrington (1973–1974): AG Warrington
- Stuart Waterton (1990–1992): SNV Waterton
- David Watson (1939): DJF Watson
- George Watson (1930): GS Watson
- Harold Watson (1924): H Watson
- Hubert Waugh (1937): HP Waugh
- Herbert Webb (1936): HG Webb
- Andrew Webster (1986–1988): AJ Webster
- Stuart Westley (1976): SA Westley
- Tony Wheeler (1949): JA Wheeler
- Tom Whittington (1912): TAL Whittington
- Jonathan Wileman (1994): JR Wileman
- Frank Wilkinson (1939): F Wilkinson
- Derek Wing (1969–1980): DC Wing
- Andrew Wingfield Digby (1989): AR Wingfield Digby
- Ashley Winlaw (1936): AWE Winlaw
- Henry Witchell (1935): HG Witchell
- Randal Woollatt (1930): RJ Woollatt

== Y ==
- Doug Yeabsley (1974–1981): DI Yeabsley
- Stuart Young (1959–1969): SH Young
