= George Rogers =

George Rogers may refer to:

== Politics ==
- George Rogers (Alberta politician) (born 1958), former mayor of Leduc, Alberta, MLA for the riding of Leduc-Beaumont-Devon
- George Rogers (British politician) (1906–1983), British member of Parliament
- George Rogers (Manitoba politician) (1856–1901), politician in Manitoba, Canada
- George Rogers (Massachusetts politician) (1933-2018), Massachusetts General Court
- George F. Rogers (1887–1948), American congressman from New York
- George H. Rogers (1825–1915), politician from California
- George W. Rogers Jr. (1927–2017), American politician

== Sports ==
- George Rogers (American football) (born 1958), American football player
- George Rogers (cricketer, born 1815) (1815–1870), English cricketer
- George Rogers (cricketer, born 1905) (1905–1958), English cricketer
- George Rogers (Surrey cricketer) (1847–1905), English cricketer
- George C. Rogers (1889–1964), American college sports coach
- George Lyttleton Rogers (1906–1962), Irish tennis player, promoter and coach

== Other ==
- George Herbert Rogers (1820–1872), Australian stage actor
- George Bigelow Rogers (1869–1945), American architect
- George B. Rogers, president of German Wallace College
- George Lawley Rogers, writer of 1936 book Studies in Paul's Epistle to the Romans, using the Concordant Version
- George White Rogers, Chief Radio Operator of the SS Morro Castle who was later convicted of the murder of 2 and attempted murder of 1.

== See also ==
- George Rodgers (disambiguation)
- George Rodger (1908–1995), British photojournalist noted for his work in Africa
- George Rogers Clark (1752–1818), soldier from Virginia
