= Thomas Maxwell (disambiguation) =

Thomas Maxwell (1792–1864) was an American attorney and politician who served as U.S. Representative from New York.

Thomas, Tom or Tommy Maxwell is also the name of:

- Thomas Maxwell (cricketer) (1903–1970)
- Thomas Maxwell (Jacobite) (died 1693), Scottish soldier
- Tom Maxwell (guitarist) (born 1968), American guitarist for the bands Knives Out! and Hellyeah
- Tom Maxwell (singer) (born 1965), American songwriter, musician, vocalist, and writer, former lead singer of the Squirrel Nut Zippers
- Tom Maxwell (officer), officer in the Royal Air Force
- Sturdy Maxwell (Thomas Maxwell, fl. 1920s), Scottish footballer
- Tommy Maxwell (born 1947), American football player
- Tommy Maxwell (ice hockey) (born 1985), American ice hockey right winger
