= George Milne (disambiguation) =

George Milne, 1st Baron Milne (1866–1948) was a British military commander.

George Milne may also refer to:

- George Milne (cricketer) (1877–1968), English cricketer
- George Heron Milne (1887–1948), American librarian
- George Lawson Milne (1850–1933), Scottish-born physician and political figure in British Columbia
