= Leslie Baker =

Leslie Baker may refer to:

- Leslie M. Baker Jr., president and chief executive officer of Wachovia Corporation
- Leslie David Baker (born 1958), American film and television actor
- Leslie Forsyth Baker (1903–1981), British film executive
- Leslie Gromis-Baker, Republican fundraiser and political aide in Pennsylvania
- Leslie Baker (cricketer) (1904–1976), English cricketer

== See also ==
- Lesley Baker (born 1944), Australian actress, singer, dancer and comedian
