= She Knew All the Answers =

1941 film by Richard Wallace

- Directed by: Richard Wallace
- Written by: Kenneth Earl; Curtis Kenyon; Harry Segall
- Based on: A Girl's Best Friend is Wall Street by Jane Allen
- Produced by: Charles R. Rogers
- Starring: Joan Bennett; Franchot Tone; Eve Arden
- Cinematography: Henry Freulich
- Edited by: Gene Havlick
- Music by: Morris Stoloff
- Production company: Columbia Pictures
- Distributed by: Columbia Pictures
- Release date: May 14, 1941
- Running time: 85 minutes
- Country: United States
- Language: English

She Knew All the Answers is a 1941 American romantic comedy film directed by Richard Wallace, and starring by Joan Bennett, Franchot Tone and Eve Arden. It was produced and distributed by Columbia Pictures. The film tells a story about a chorus girl who wants to marry a rich playboy, but first has to prove herself to his financial advisor. The screenplay was written by Kenneth Earl, Curtis Kenyon, and Harry Segall, adapted from a short story written by Jane Allen entitled "A Girl's Best Friend Is Wall Street," published in 1938 in Cosmopolitan Magazine.

== Plot ==
A chorus girl, Gloria Winters (Joan Bennett), is overjoyed that wealthy young Randy Bradford (John Hubbard) is so eager to marry her, he's asked her to elope. Before they can leave, Randy is contacted by Mark Willows (Franchot Tone), a partner with the Wall Street financial organization that Randy's father founded, as well as Randy's financial advisor. Willows stipulates that Randy will be disinherited should he elope with this girl.

Gloria is naturally upset. She comes up with a plan to gain Willows' approval through work and receive a letter of recommendation, which can then be used as their marriage license. When she goes to see Willows, she expects an older man and is thrown off-balance by his youth and charm. Without revealing her true identity, Gloria lands a job at Willows' firm as a switchboard operator. A slip of the tongue on her part, however, costs Willows a great deal of money and she is fired.

Willows calms down and tries to make it up to her, visiting the apartment Gloria shares with Sally Long, another chorus girl. While there, Willows offers Gloria her job back, which she accepts. Gloria and Willow continue to advance both their professional and personal relationships, both in and out of the office. Randy starts to see the chemistry forming between the two and gets jealous. He goes to Willows and demands a job as well. Willows learns Gloria's true identity and agrees to allow Randy and Gloria to get married, in an attempt to mask his feelings for Gloria.

While walking down the aisle at the wedding, a ghost like figure of each character acts as a personification of their inner thoughts and the viewer learns that Randy no longer wants to get married and Gloria and Willows have both fallen for each other. Randy pretends to faint in hopes of ending the wedding, and Gloria and Willows take this opportunity to run away together.

== Cast ==
- Joan Bennett as Gloria Winters
- Franchot Tone as Mark Willows
- John Hubbard as Randy Bradford
- Eve Arden as Sally Long
- William Tracy as Benny
- Pierre Watkin as George Wharton
- Almira Sessions as Elaine Wingate
- Thurston Hall as J.D. Sutton
- Grady Sutton as Ogleby
- Luis Alberni as Inventor
- Francis Compton as Tompkins
- Dick Elliott as Broker
- Selmer Jackson as Broker
- Forbes Murray as Broker
- Roscoe Ates as Gas Station Attendant
- Chester Clute as Butter and Egg Man
- George Lloyd as Cop
- Frank Sully as Cop
- Eddie Conrad as Waiter
- Patti McCarty as Hat Check Girl
- William 'Billy' Benedict as Singing Telegraph Boy
- Fern Emmett as Woman Applicant
- Walter Soderling as Building Utility Man
- Don Beddoe as Barber
- Patricia Hill as Manicurist
- Onest Conley as Shoeshine Boy
- George Hickman as Elevator Operator
- Don Marion as Elevator Operator
- Alice Keating as Telephone Operator
- Dave Willock as Messenger Boy
- Thom Metzetti as Milkman
- George Beranger as Head Waiter
- Byron Foulger as Man in the Elevator
- Charles Lane as Coney Island Bus Driver

== Adaptions ==
She Knew All The Answers was adapted from a short story by Jane Allen entitled "A Girls Best Friend Is Wall Street". This story was printed in Cosmopolitan Magazine in December, 1938. On January 11, 1943, Lux Radio Theater ran a 56-minute adaption of the movie, starring Joan Bennett and Preston Foster.

== Bibliography ==
- Tucker, David C. Eve Arden: A Chronicle of All Film, Television, Radio and Stage Performances. McFarland, 2014.
