= Clifford Smith =

Clifford Smith may refer to:

- Clifford Smith (director) (1894–1937), American film director
- Clifford V. Smith Jr. (born 1931), chancellor of University of Wisconsin–Milwaukee, 1986–1990
- Clifford Smith (cricketer) (1902–1959), English cricketer
- Method Man, rapper Clifford Smith Jr. (born 1971)
- Mr. Vegas, Jamaican dancehall star Clifford Smith (born 1974)

== See also ==
- Cliff Smith (disambiguation)
- Clifford Smyth (born 1934), historian and politician
