= Alan Parnaby =

Alan Parnaby may refer to:

- Alan Parnaby (cricketer), English cricketer and British Army officer
- Alan Parnaby (actor), British actor

== See also ==
- Alana Parnaby, Australian tennis player
