= James Wheeler =

James Wheeler may refer to:

- James Wheeler (cricketer) (1913–1977), English cricketer
- James Atkin Wheeler (c. 1800?–1861), Australian politician, member of the Victorian Legislative Council
- James Talboys Wheeler (1824–1897), bureaucrat-historian of the British Raj
- James Wheeler (American politician) (1793–1854), American politician in Michigan
- James Wheeler (Australian politician) (1826–1904), member of the Victorian Legislative Assembly
- James Wheeler (musician) (1937–2014), American Chicago blues guitarist, singer and songwriter

== See also ==
- Jimmy Wheeler (disambiguation)
- Jim Wheeler (born 1953), Nevada politician
- James E. Wheeler House, located in Portland, Oregon
