= Thomas Dobson =

Thomas Dobson may refer to:

- Thomas Dobson (printer) (1751–1823), master printer most famous for having published the earliest American version of the Encyclopædia Britannica
- Thomas Dobson (rugby) (1872–1902), rugby union footballer who played for Bradford F.C. and England
- Thomas Dobson (politician) (1853–1935), British Member of Parliament for Plymouth, 1906–1910
- Tom Dobson (rugby union) (1871–1937), Scottish-born rugby union forward who played for Cardiff and Wales
- Tom Dobson (cricketer) (1901–1940), English cricketer
- Tom Dobson (golfer) (1903–1968), Scottish golfer
