= USS Shark =

USS Shark has been the name of more than one United States Navy ship, and may refer to:

- USS Shark (1821), a schooner commissioned in 1821 and wrecked in 1846
- Shark, a schooner captured in 1861, acquired by the Navy in 1863, and in commission as USS George W. Rodgers (1861) from January 1865 to August 1865
- USS Shark (SS-8), a submarine in commission from 1903 to 1919, renamed USS A-7 in 1911
- USS Shark (SP-534), a patrol vessel in commission from 1917 to 1919
- USS Shark (SS-174), a submarine commissioned in 1936 and sunk in 1942
- USS Shark (SS-314), a submarine commissioned in February 1944 and sunk in October 1944
- USS Shark (SSN-591), a submarine in commission from 1961 to 1990
