= Parnaby =

Parnaby is a surname. Notable people with the surname include:

- Alan Parnaby (cricketer) (1916–1974), English cricketer and British Army officer
- Alan Parnaby (actor), British television and film actor
- Bert Parnaby (1924–1992), British actor
- Kaia Parnaby (born 1990), Australian softball player
- Stuart Parnaby (born 1982), English footballer
