= George Rodgers =

George Rodgers may refer to:

- George Rodgers (VC) (1829–1870), Scottish recipient of the Victoria Cross
- George Rodgers (footballer) (1899–1982), Scottish footballer (Chelsea)
- George Rodgers (politician) (1925–2000), British Labour Party politician
- George Washington Rodgers (1822–1863), officer of the United States Navy
  - USS George W. Rodgers
- George Washington Rodgers (1787–1832), his father, naval officer

== See also ==
- George Rodger (1908–1995), British photojournalist
- George Rogers (disambiguation)
