= Cliff Smith =

Cliff Smith may refer to:

- Cliff Smith, guitarist in Ultimate Beatles and The Forgers
- Cliff Smith (golfer), see NCAA Division III Men's Golf Championships
- Cliff Smith (musician) in Basic Radio
- Cliff Smith (filmmaker) see The Return of Draw Egan

== See also ==
- Clifford Smith (disambiguation)
