= Jimmy Wheeler (disambiguation) =

Jimmy Wheeler (1910–1973) was a British comedian.

Jimmy or Jim Wheeler may also refer to:

- Jimmy Wheeler (footballer) (1933–2020), English footballer, active 1946 to 1964
- Jim Wheeler (born 1953), Nevada politician
- Jim Wheeler, subject of the documentary Jim in Bold

== See also ==
- James Wheeler (disambiguation)
