= Thomas Maxwell (cricketer) =

English cricketer

Personal information
- Full name: Thomas Stanislaus Alfred Charles Joseph Maxwell
- Born: 15 March 1903; Westminster, London, England
- Died: 27 March 1970 (aged 67); Camberwell, London, England
- Batting: Right-handed
- Bowling: Right-arm medium-fast

Domestic team information
- Years: Team
- 1937–1938: Minor Counties

Career statistics
Competition	First-class
Matches	2
Runs scored	79
Batting average	39.50
100s/50s	–/1
Top score	78*
Balls bowled	270
Wickets	2
Bowling average	54.00
5 wickets in innings	–
10 wickets in match	–
Best bowling	1/11
Catches/stumpings	–/–
- Source: Cricinfo, 9 July 2012

Thomas Stanislaus Alfred Charles Joseph Maxwell (15 March 1903 – 27 March 1970) was an English cricketer. Maxwell was a right-handed batsman who bowled right-arm medium-fast. He was born at Westminster, London.

Having played infrequently in the Minor Counties Championship for the Surrey Second XI since 1927, Maxwell was selected to play for the combined Minor Counties cricket team in a first-class match against the touring New Zealanders in 1937 at the Rose Brothers Ground, Gainsborough. The Minor Counties won the toss and elected to bat first, making 310 all out in their first-innings, with Maxwell ending the innings not out on 78. In response, the New Zealanders made 337 all out in their first-innings, to which the Minor Counties responded in their second-innings by making just 76 all out, with Maxwell being dismissed for a duck by Norman Gallichan. Set 49 for victory, the New Zealanders reached their target with 7 wickets in hand, despite Maxwell taking the wicket of Gallichan. He made a second first-class appearance for the team in 1938 against Oxford University at the University Parks. Oxford University won the toss and elected to bat first, making 217 all out. The Minor Counties responded in their first-innings by making 175 all out, with being dismissed for a duck by Michael Magill. Oxford University then made 319 all out in their second-innings, with Maxwell taking the wicket of Desmond Eagar to finish with figures of 1/49. Set a target of 362, the Minor Counties could only manage to make 131 all out, with Maxwell ending the innings not out on a single run. His final appearance for the Surrey Second XI came in the 1938 Minor Counties Championship against Wiltshire. His appearances for the team were infrequent, with him making 27 appearances.

He died at Camberwell, London, on 27 March 1970.
