= Puckeridge =

Village in Hertfordshire, England

Coordinates: 51°54′N 0°00′E

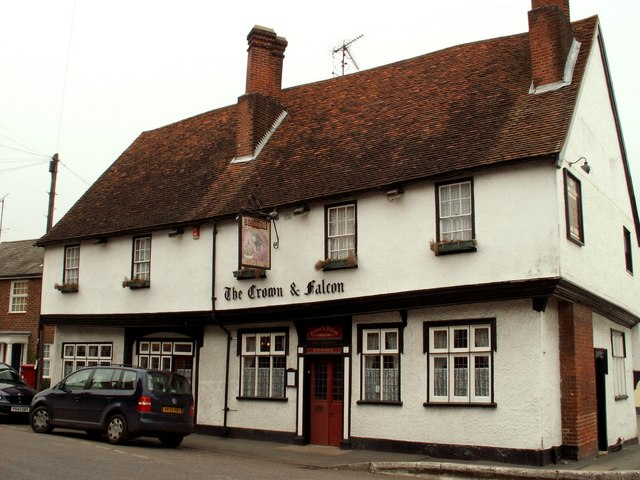
- The Crown and Falcon, Puckeridge

- Location within Hertfordshire
- Population: 3,561
- OS grid reference: TL 3861 2327
- Civil parish: Standon
- Shire county: Hertfordshire
- Region: East
- Country: England
- Sovereign state: United Kingdom
- Post town: WARE
- Postcode district: SG11
- Dialling code: 01920
- Police: Hertfordshire
- Fire: Hertfordshire
- Ambulance: East of England
- UK Parliament: North East Hertfordshire

Puckeridge is a village in East Hertfordshire, England with a population of 3,561 (2011 Census). It is in the civil parish of Standon.

== History ==
The earliest known settlement was founded by the Catuvellauni, Celts from northeastern France. The Celts began to arrive around 250 BC. The Belgae arrived around 180 BC. A Roman town existed just to the north of the existing village and the village is at the crossroads of two major Roman roads, Ermine Street and Stane Street. By 200AD the Romans had built a town, at the north of the current village, called Ad Fines. It was a regional capital and was also the start point for the roads to St Albans and Baldock – all-important pre-Roman Celtic centres. Ad Fines had a large temple dedicated to Minerva. It also had at least two bath houses on the banks of the River Rib. The town survived until the end of the 5th century.

The neighbouring villages of Standon and Braughing are recorded in the Domesday Book of 1086, but Puckeridge is not although it was probably in existence. It survived the Black Death in the 14th century. A number of charities were established in Puckeridge in the 17th century, which gave grants of land that enabled the expansion of the village. The village developed and thrived because it was on the coaching route between London and Cambridge; Samuel Pepys records that he stopped at the Falcon (now the Crown and Falcon). Eventually, the coming of the railway in the 19th century led to a decline in the fortune of the many Taverns and Inns in the village. The village is now a popular place to live, being close to good road networks leading into and around London.

Near Puckeridge, there was Puckeridge DECCA tower, a free-standing tower radiator used for DECCA.

== Today ==
The village houses three schools, small convenience stores and two pubs with a mixture of old and relatively new houses.

== HMS Puckeridge ==
The village shares its name with HMS Puckeridge, a Hunt class destroyer which was lost to enemy action during World War II. On 8 September 2003, a 60th Anniversary Commemoration Service was held in the village to honour members of the ship's company who lost their lives while serving aboard. This was attended by five survivors, members of the Royal Naval Association, British Legion and the Puckeridge and Standon community.

== Notable people ==
- Arturo Barea and Ilse Barea-Kulcsar, lived in Puckeridge while in exile
- Cyril Fordham (1906–1988), cricketer

== Trivia ==
Puckeridge is the name of a third-string theatre critic in Tom Stoppard's drama The Real Inspector Hound.

The village is mentioned in the novel Colonel Jaques from Daniel Defoe and Rose Tremain's Restoration.

== See also ==
- The Hundred Parishes
