= Cyril Fordham =

English cricketer (1906–1988)

Personal information
- Full name: Cyril Bernard Fordham
- Born: 22 September 1906; Puckeridge, Hertfordshire, England
- Died: 22 April 1988 (aged 81); Bath, Somerset, England
- Batting: Right-handed
- Bowling: Right-arm off break

Domestic team information
- Years: Team
- 1931–1937: Minor Counties
- 1924–1939: Hertfordshire

Career statistics
| Competition | First-class |
|---|---|
| Matches | 5 |
| Runs scored | 414 |
| Batting average | 51.75 |
| 100s/50s | 2/– |
| Top score | 140 |
| Balls bowled | 204 |
| Wickets | 2 |
| Bowling average | 45.50 |
| 5 wickets in innings | – |
| 10 wickets in match | – |
| Best bowling | 2/34 |
| Catches/stumpings | 2/– |
- Source: Cricinfo, 20 May 2012

Cyril Bernard Fordham (22 September 1906 – 22 April 1988) was an English cricketer. Fordham was a right-handed batsman who bowled right-arm off break. He was born at Puckeridge, Hertfordshire.

Fordham made his debut in county cricket for Hertfordshire against Buckinghamshire in the 1924 Minor Counties Championship. He played Minor counties cricket for Hertfordshire from 1924 to 1939, making 121 appearances, the last of which came against Buckinghamshire. During his career with the county, he scored nearly 6,000 runs at an average of close to 33, and took nearly 200 wickets with the ball, at 17 apiece. In 1931, he was selected to play for a combined Minor Counties team, making his first-class debut for the team against the touring New Zealanders at the Rose Brothers Ground, Gainsborough. He made four further first-class appearances for the team during the thirties, the last of which came against Oxford University in 1937. In his five first-class appearances for the team, he scored a total of 414 runs at an average of 51.75, with a high score of 140. This score was one of two centuries he made, both of which came against Oxford University in 1933, with his score of 140 in the Minor Counties first-innings accompanied by 100 not out in their second-innings. He also took 2 wickets with the ball overall, which came at an average of 45.50, with best figures of 2/34.

He died at Bath, Somerset, on 22 April 1988.
