= Michael Farebrother =

English cricketer

Personal information
- Full name: Michael Humphrey Farebrother
- Born: 28 February 1920; Chelsea, London, England
- Died: 27 September 1987 (aged 67); Seaford, Sussex, England
- Batting: Right-handed
- Bowling: Left-arm fast-medium

Domestic team information
- Years: Team
- 1939: Oxford University

Career statistics
Competition	First-class
Matches	1
Runs scored	1
Batting average	0.50
100s/50s	–/–
Top score	1
Balls bowled	224
Wickets	4
Bowling average	32.00
5 wickets in innings	–
10 wickets in match	–
Best bowling	2/49
Catches/stumpings	2/–
- Source: Cricinfo, 2 May 2020

Michael Humphrey Farebrother (28 February 1920 – 27 September 1987) was an English first-class cricketer and educator.

Farebrother was born at Chelsea in February 1920. He was educated at Eton College, before going up to Trinity College, Oxford. While studying at Oxford, he made a single appearance in first-class cricket for Oxford University against a combined Minor Counties cricket team at Oxford in 1939. Playing as a left-arm fast-medium bowler, he took the wickets of Frank Dennis and David Watson in the Minor Counties first innings, while in their second innings he dismissed Alan Parnaby and Watson, finishing with match figures of 4 for 128. With the declaration of war on Germany in September 1939, Farebrother's first-class career came to a premature end, though he did complete his studies.

After graduating from Oxford, Farebrother served in the Second World War with the Grenadier Guards, being commissioned as a second lieutenant in December 1940. He served in the Italian campaign and was erroneously reported as killed in action in Italy in the 1945 edition of the Wisden Cricketers' Almanack. He continued to serve with the Grenadier Guards after the war, gaining the rank of lieutenant in January 1949. By the 1950s, Farebrother was working as a schoolmaster and in 1956 he was appointed to the post of headmaster at St Peter's School, Seaford. During the 1956–57 Christmas holidays, he was the personal tutor to Charles, Prince of Wales at Windsor Castle. Farebrother was the headmaster at Seaford until his retirement in 1982, which resulted in the closure of the school in the same year. He died at Seaford in September 1987.
