= Herbert Hodgson =

English cricketer

Personal information
- Full name: Herbert William Hodgson
- Born: 23 May 1891; Liverpool, Lancashire, England
- Died: 30 April 1964 (aged 72); Sewardstone, Essex, England
- Batting: Right-handed

Domestic team information
- Years: Team
- 1914–1932: Cheshire
- 1924–1929: Minor Counties

Career statistics
| Competition | First-class |
|---|---|
| Matches | 2 |
| Runs scored | 79 |
| Batting average | 19.75 |
| 100s/50s | 0/0 |
| Top score | 45 |
| Catches/stumpings | 1/– |
- Source: Cricinfo, 20 May 2012

Herbert William Hodgson (23 May 1891 – 30 April 1964) was an English cricketer. Hodgson was a right-handed batsman. He was born at Liverpool, Lancashire.

Hodgson made his debut in county cricket for Cheshire against the Essex Second XI in 1914. He returned to playing Minor counties cricket for Cheshire following the end of World War I, playing a further 48 matches for the county from 1920 to 1932, with his final appearance coming against the Yorkshire Second XI. He captained Cheshire in 1929. He was later selected to represent a combined Minor Counties cricket team in 1924, making his first-class debut against HDG Leveson Gower's XI at The Saffrons, Eastbourne. In this match, Hodgson scored 1 in the Minor Counties first-innings, before being dismissed by Francis Browne, while in their second-innings he scored 45 runs, before being dismissed by Gerry Crutchley. He later made a second first-class appearance for the team in 1929 against the touring South Africans at the County Ground, Stoke-on-Trent. In this match, Hodgson scored 25 in the Minor Counties first-innings, before being dismissed by Neville Quinn, while in their second-innings he scored 8 runs, before being dismissed by Sandy Bell.

He died at Sewardstone, Essex, on 30 April 1964.
