= Edmund Bourne (cricketer) =

English cricketer

Personal information
- Full name: Edmund Horace Bourne
- Born: 14 February 1885; Stoke-on-Trent, Staffordshire, England
- Died: 7 August 1962 (aged 77); Earlswood, Surrey, England
- Batting: Right-handed
- Bowling: Right-arm slow

Domestic team information
- Years: Team
- 1912: Minor Counties
- 1904–1922: Staffordshire

Career statistics
Competition	First-class
Matches	1
Runs scored	16
Batting average	16.00
100s/50s	–/–
Top score	16
Balls bowled	–
Wickets	–
Bowling average	–
5 wickets in innings	–
10 wickets in match	–
Best bowling	–
Catches/stumpings	–/–
- Source: Cricinfo, 29 April 2012

Edmund Horace Bourne (14 February 1885 – 7 August 1962) was an English cricketer. Bourne was a right-handed batsman who bowled right-arm slow. He was born at Stoke-on-Trent, Staffordshire.

Bourne made his debut in county cricket for Staffordshire in the 1904 Minor Counties Championship against Dorset. Between 1904 and the start of World War I in 1914, Bourne made 49 appearances for Staffordshire in the Minor Counties Championship. In 1912, he was selected to play in a combined Minor Counties cricket team for its inaugural appearance in first-class cricket against the touring South Africans at the County Ground, Stoke-on-Trent, in 1912. In what was Bourne's only first-class appearance, he batted once in the match, scoring 16 runs in the Minor Counties first-innings as an opening batsman, before being dismissed by Aubrey Faulkner. Following World War I, he made five further appearances in the Minor Counties Championship for Staffordshire, with his final appearance coming against the Surrey Second XI in 1912.

Bourne had three brothers, all of whom played Minor counties cricket for Staffordshire. Bourne died at Earlswood, Surrey, on 7 August 1962. He was buried at St Mary's Church, Reigate, next to his wife, Elsie.
