= David Watson (cricketer) =

English cricketer

Personal information
- Full name: David James Falshaw Watson
- Born: 18 November 1919; St Pancras, London, England
- Died: 3 October 1943 (aged 23) near New Gloucester, Maine, United States
- Batting: Right-handed

Domestic team information
- Years: Team
- 1939: Oxford University
- 1939: Minor Counties

Career statistics
Competition	First-class
Matches	2
Runs scored	83
Batting average	27.66
100s/50s	–/–
Top score	35
Catches/stumpings	–/–
- Source: Cricinfo, 1 December 2013

David James Falshaw Watson (18 November 1919 – 3 October 1943) was an English cricketer – a right-handed batsman. He was born at St Pancras, London.

Educated at Sedbergh School, Watson later studied at the University of Oxford. Watson made his first-class debut in unusual circumstances during a match between Oxford University and a combined Minor counties team in 1939. Having bowled nine overs in Oxford University's first-innings, the Minor Counties Francis Wilkinson was injured and took no further part in the match. The spectating Watson was allowed by the agreement of Oxford University to take to the field for the Minor Counties as a substitute player. Batting in the Minor Counties first-innings, Watson scored 33 runs before he was dismissed by Michael Farebrother, while in their second-innings he was dismissed by the same bowler for 35 runs.

Following this match he made a second first-class appearance, this time for Oxford University against Leicestershire. In a match which ended as a draw he was dismissed for 7 runs in the university's first-innings by Vic Jackson, while in their second-innings he remained unbeaten with 8 runs.

== Military career and death ==
Watson served in the Royal Naval Volunteer Reserve, reaching the rank of sub-lieutenant by 1943. Serving as part of the Fleet Air Arm stationed at HMS Saker in the United States, Watson was undertaking a training flight on 3 October 1943 with a F4U Corsair when his plane was involved in a mid-air collision with fellow Fleet Air Arm pilot and fighter ace Alfred Jack Sewell close to the Maine town of New Gloucester, killing both pilots. Watson was buried with full military honours at the Portsmouth Naval Shipyard cemetery.
