= Derek Ashley =

English cricketer

Personal information
- Full name: Derek John Ashley
- Born: 22 January 1956 (age 70); Whitchurch, Shropshire, England
- Batting: Right-handed
- Role: Wicket-keeper

Domestic team information
- Years: Team
- 1986: Minor Counties
- 1982–1992: Shropshire

Career statistics
Competition	First-class	List A
Matches	1	6
Runs scored	4	36
Batting average	2.00	9.00
100s/50s	–/–	–/–
Top score	4	13
Balls bowled	–	–
Wickets	–	–
Bowling average	–	–
5 wickets in innings	–	–
10 wickets in match	–	–
Best bowling	–	–
Catches/stumpings	–/1	6/1
- Source: Cricinfo, 4 July 2011

Derek John Ashley (born 22 January 1956) is a former English first-class cricketer. Ashley was a right-handed batsman who fielded as a wicket-keeper. He was born in Whitchurch, Shropshire, educated at Whitchurch Secondary Modern School and played club level for Whitchurch and Shrewsbury Cricket Clubs.

Ashley made his debut for Shropshire in the 1982 Minor Counties Championship against Staffordshire. Ashley played Minor counties cricket for Shropshire from 1982 to 1991, which included 74 Minor Counties Championship appearances and 15 MCCA Knockout Trophy appearances. He made his List A debut against Somerset in the 1983 NatWest Trophy. He made 5 further List A appearances, the last of which came against Leicestershire in the 1989 NatWest Trophy. In his 6 List A matches, he scored 36 runs at an average of 9.00, with a high score of 13. Behind the stumps he took 6 catches and made a single stumping.

He made a single first-class appearance for the Minor Counties cricket team against the touring New Zealanders. He scored 4 runs in the Minor Counties first-innings, before being dismissed by Evan Gray. In their second-innings, Ashley was dismissed for a duck by Brian Barrett. Although he did not take any catches in the match, he did make a single stumping, stumping Jeff Crowe off the bowling of Steve Plumb.
