= Dennis Stokes =

English cricketer

Personal information
- Full name: Dennis Wilfrid Stokes
- Born: 26 January 1911; Reading, Berkshire, England
- Died: 14 November 1998 (aged 87); Reading, Berkshire, England
- Batting: Right-handed
- Role: Wicket-keeper

Domestic team information
- Years: Team
- 1928–1966: Berkshire
- 1937–1938: Minor Counties

Career statistics
Competition	First-class
Matches	2
Runs scored	47
Batting average	11.75
100s/50s	0/0
Top score	39
Catches/stumpings	1/–
- Source: Cricinfo, 22 November 2011

Dennis Wilfrid Stokes (26 January 1911 – 14 November 1998) was an English cricketer. Stokes was a wicket-keeper and right handed batsman. He was born in Reading, Berkshire and was educated at Wellingborough School in Northamptonshire.

Stokes made his debut for Berkshire in the 1928 Minor Counties Championship against Wiltshire. Nearly a decade later in 1927 he made his first-class debut for the Minor Counties against Oxford University. In this match, he was dismissed for a duck by David Macindoe, while in their second-innings he was dismissed for 39 by Sandy Singleton. He played a second first-class match for the Minor Counties the following season against the same opposition. In this match, he scored a single run in the Minor Counties first-innings, before being dismissed by Michael Magill, while in their second-innings the same bowler dismissed him for 7. Stokes had been made Berkshire captain in 1937, a position he retained after World War II and held until 1954, when he seemingly played his final match for Berkshire against Buckinghamshire in the Minor Counties Championship. However, twelve years later he returned to play a single match in the 1966 Minor Counties Championship against Dorset. He made a total of 154 appearances for the county in that competition and scored a total of 5,365 runs. As a wicket-keeper he holds the Berkshire record for the most stumpings made with 45.

He died at the town of his birth on 14 November 1998.
