= International Grammar School =

International Grammar School, Sydney
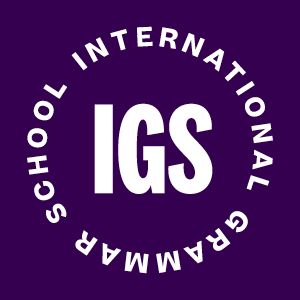

Location
- Ultimo, New South Wales; Australia; 33°52′52″S 151°11′43″E

Information
- Type: Independent coeducational early learning, primary, and secondary day school
- Motto: Latin: Concordia per Diversitatem ("Unity Through Diversity")
- Established: 1984; 42 years ago
- Educational authority: NSW Department of Education
- Principal: Shauna Colnan
- Key people: Reg St. Leon (Founding Principal)
- Years: Early learning and K–12
- Enrolment: ~1,100 (2007)
- Campuses: Ultimo: Kelly Street; Mountain Street
- Campus type: Inner urban
- Colours: Green, blue and gold
- Affiliations: Association of Heads of Independent Schools of Australia; Junior School Heads Association of Australia; Association of Independent Schools of New South Wales
- Website: www.igssyd.nsw.edu.au

International Grammar School (IGS) is a dual campus independent secular coeducational early learning, primary, and secondary day school, located in Ultimo, an inner city suburb of Sydney, New South Wales, Australia.

Established in Randwick in 1984, International Grammar focuses its curriculum on languages, and to a lesser extent music, and currently caters for approximately 1,200 students from early learning to Year 12. The school provides an alternative to a denominational independent school education.

International Grammar School is affiliated with the Association of Heads of Independent Schools of Australia (AHISA), the Junior School Heads Association of Australia (JSHAA), and the Association of Independent Schools of New South Wales (AIS NSW).

== History ==
International Grammar School was established on 3 February 1984 at Stanley Street, Randwick, formerly the premises of the Little Sisters of the Poor. At its foundation the school's educational objective was to provide bilingual education from preschool onwards, and to promote internationalism, music and racial tolerance.

By 1985 the school had an enrolment of around 120 students, however by the following year the school's future was in doubt due to its failure to gain NSW Government recognition, thus making its students ineligible to sit Year 10 and NSW Higher School Certificate (HSC) examinations. IGS was subsequently forced to battle through eight court cases. The school was also facing crippling losses of money and enrolments had fallen by 60 per cent to around 40 students. In May 1986, the school won its registration appeal. By the end of the school year of 1988, enrolments had grown to 130.

As student numbers continued to increase and the need for specialised High School teaching facilities was identified, it was determined that an additional site was required for the school. From 1990 to 1994, new premises in Balmain were utilised as a Senior High School, accommodating Years 11 and 12.

In 1994, leasing arrangements were negotiated with South Sydney Council in terms of which the school was to move progressively to a new site in Ultimo. During this time, temporary accommodation was provided for years 7 to 12 in a refurbished woolstore. This arrangement with Council was for a new school to be constructed on the historical site of the Dalgety Woolstore on Kelly Street, Ultimo. The school was officially established on this, its current site, in July 1997.

== Curriculum ==
The school's main emphasis is on languages and it offers a wide range of language courses for study from Preschool through to the HSC. Students are required to learn a second language from when they start at the school until the end of Year 10, and in Years 7 and 8 are required to learn a third language. Either of these may be continued to HSC level. The school also offers to students in Years 10 and 11 an exchange program to its overseas sister schools in Italy, France, Germany and Japan, as well as exchanges to Spain and China for Years 8 and 9. The creative arts, including music, design and drama, also play an important role in the school's curriculum.

== Campus ==
International Grammar School is situated on two main campuses in Ultimo – one on Kelly St and another nearby on Mountain St. The Kelly St Campus is made up of three buildings, The recently renamed Reg St Leon Building (formally Kelly St), the Wright Building and the Kerrie Murphy Building. Due to increasing demand for space, the roofs of the main campus are opened for playing; one as a basketball court; the other with primary school equipment.

== Principals ==
- Shauna Colnan (2014–present)
- Michael Maniska (2011–2014)
- Kerrie Murphy (2001–2010)
- David Wright (1994–2000)
- Eddie Jones (Acting Principal) (1992–1993)
- Marika McLachlan (1991–1992)
- Rita Fin (1987–1990)
- Reg St Leon (1984–1987)

== Notable alumni ==
- Bertie Blackman – Indie singer songwriter based in Sydney
- Rowan Witt – actor in movies, theatre and television whose notable credits include The Matrix, South Pacific, She Loves Me and The Book of Mormon

== Notable staff ==
- Eddie Jones – former teacher and Acting Principal from 1992 to 1994; World Cup winning assistant coach of the South African national rugby union team, and former head coach of the England national rugby union team
- Timothy Lester – former Stoic and first class cricket player
- Ned Manning - playwright and actor

== See also ==
- List of non-government schools in New South Wales
- Education in Australia
