= Rodney Rought-Rought =

English cricketer

Rodney Charles Rought-Rought (17 February 1908 – 5 May 1979) was an English cricketer who played 34 first-class matches between 1930 and 1937. He was born in Brandon, Suffolk and died in Fulham, London. Most of his appearances came for Cambridge University, but he also played for Free Foresters and HDG Leveson-Gower's XI.

Two of his brothers, Desmond Rought-Rought and Basil Rought-Rought, also played first-class cricket. The three brothers had long careers in Minor Counties cricket for Norfolk, where they encouraged the young Bill Edrich. He later wrote, "many a time they gave me a quiet hint or bit of advice that was invaluable, and which occurred to me many a time afterwards, in the strenuous, hard grind of a Test match".

The unusual surname originated with their father, who was born Albert William Rought Whitta. His maternal grandfather William Rought left him the family hatters and furriers business in Brandon on the condition that he adopted the surname Rought. He became Albert William Rought-Rought.
