= Basil Rought-Rought =

English cricketer

Personal information
- Full name: Basil William Rought-Rought
- Born: 15 September 1904; Brandon, Suffolk, England
- Died: 27 October 1995 (aged 91); Brandon, Suffolk, England
- Batting: Left-handed
- Relatives: Rodney Rought-Rought (brother); Desmond Rought-Rought (brother)

Domestic team information
- Years: Team
- 1937–1938: Minor Counties
- 1926–1948: Norfolk

Career statistics
Competition	First-class
Matches	4
Runs scored	229
Batting average	28.62
100s/50s	–/2
Top score	61
Balls bowled	–
Wickets	–
Bowling average	–
5 wickets in innings	–
10 wickets in match	–
Best bowling	–
Catches/stumpings	3/–
- Source: Cricinfo, 15 August 2012

Basil William Rought-Rought (15 September 1904 – 27 October 1995) was an English cricketer. Rought-Rought was a left-handed batsman. He was born at Brandon, Suffolk.

Rought-Rought made his debut for Norfolk against Hertfordshire in the 1926 Minor Counties Championship. He made 123 appearances in the Minor Counties Championship for Cheshire before World War II. He made his debut in first-class cricket in 1933 for HDG Leveson Gower's XI against Oxford University at The Saffrons, Eastbourne, with him making a further first-class appearance in that season for the team at the same venue against Cambridge University. He scored 129 runs in his two matches, which a high score of 61 against Cambridge University. Playing minor counties cricket for Norfolk allowed Rought-Rought to be selected to play for a combined Minor Counties cricket team, with him making his debut for the team in a first-class match against the touring New Zealanders in 1937 at the Rose Brothers Ground, Gainsborough. He made a further first-class appearance for the team in 1938 against Oxford University at the University Parks. In his two first-class matches for the team, he scored 100 runs, with a high score of 50 against the New Zealanders.

He served during World War II in the Royal Norfolk Regiment, holding the rank of Lieutenant in 1940. He was captured in France in 1940, spending most of the war as a Prisoner of War. He attempted to escape captivity, but was unsuccessful on his first attempt. In 1945, he made a second attempt at escaping captivity, this time succeeding in his escape and returning to England.

Following World War II, Rought-Rought returned to playing minor counties cricket for Norfolk, making sixteen further appearances, the last of which came against Buckinghamshire in 1948. His brothers, Rodney and Desmond, both played first-class cricket. The three brothers all had long careers for Norfolk, where they encouraged the young Bill Edrich. He later wrote, "many a time they gave me a quiet hint or bit of advice that was invaluable, and which occurred to me many a time afterwards, in the strenuous, hard grind of a Test match".

The brothers' unusual surname originated with their father, who was born Albert William Rought Whitta. His maternal grandfather William Rought left him the family hatters and furriers business in Brandon on the condition that he adopted the surname Rought. He became Albert William Rought-Rought.

Basil Rought-Rought died at the place of his birth on 27 October 1995.
