= Timothy Lester =

English cricketer (born 1964)

Timothy Adam Lester (born 25 March 1964) is a former English cricketer born in Hampstead.

He boarded at Stowe School on a cricketing scholarship, and attended Exeter University for his tertiary education.

Lester made his cricketing debut in the Minor Counties Championship for Oxfordshire during the 1984 season and played regularly for the team for eleven seasons, and he made a single first-class appearance, for Minor Counties, during the 1990 season. In the only innings in which he batted, he scored a valiant 4 runs before being caught off the bowling of Anil Kumble

Lester made seven List A appearances for Oxfordshire between 1989 and 1993. He was an upper-middle order batsman.

Currently, he works as an English Teacher at International Grammar School at Ultimo, in Sydney, Australia.

He also enjoys walking his Australian Kelpie x Staffordshire Bull Terrier along scenic routes.
