= Jackie Keeler =

English cricketer (1924–2005)

Personal information
- Full name: John George Keeler
- Born: 2 May 1924; South Moor, County Durham, England
- Died: 9 October 2005 (aged 81); South Stanley, County Durham, England
- Batting: Right-handed
- Bowling: Right-arm medium

Domestic team information
- Years: Team
- 1953: Minor Counties
- 1949–1957: Durham

Career statistics
Competition	First-class
Matches	1
Runs scored	11
Batting average	5.50
100s/50s	–/–
Top score	10
Balls bowled	–
Wickets	–
Bowling average	–
5 wickets in innings	–
10 wickets in match	–
Best bowling	–
Catches/stumpings	–/–
- Source: Cricinfo, 7 September 2011

John George Keeler (2 May 1924 – 9 October 2005) was an English cricketer. Keeler was a right-handed batsman who bowled right-arm medium pace. He was born in South Moor, County Durham.

Keeler made his debut for Durham in the 1949 Minor Counties Championship against the Lancashire Second XI. He played Minor counties cricket for Durham from 1949 to 1957, making 54 appearances. During this period he made a single first-class appearance for the Minor Counties against the touring Australians in 1953. He was dismissed in the Minor Counties first-innings for a single run by Bill Johnston, with the Minor Counties being dismissed for just 56 runs. Following-on ib their second-innings they fared little better, being dismissed for 62, with Keeler scoring 10 runs before being dismissed by Ron Archer. The Australians won the match by an innings and 171 runs.

He died at South Stanley, County Durham on 9 October 2005.
