= Norman Owen =

English cricketer

Personal information
- Full name: Norman William Owen
- Born: 16 March 1915; Shepherd's Bush, London, England
- Died: 9 September 1977 (aged 62); Newton Aycliffe, County Durham, England
- Batting: Right-handed
- Bowling: Right-arm off break Right-arm medium-fast

Domestic team information
- Years: Team
- 1951: Minor Counties
- 1947–1955: Durham

Career statistics
Competition	First-class
Matches	1
Runs scored	26
Batting average	13.00
100s/50s	0/0
Top score	14
Balls bowled	84
Wickets	1
Bowling average	33.00
5 wickets in innings	0
10 wickets in match	0
Best bowling	1/33
Catches/stumpings	0/–
- Source: Cricinfo, 4 October 2011

Norman William Owen (16 March 1915 – 9 September 1977) was an English cricketer. Owen was a right-handed batsman who bowled both right-arm off break and right-arm medium-fast. He was born in Shepherd's Bush, London.

Having played for the Surrey Second XI in 1934 and 1935 in the Minor Counties Championship, Owen joined Durham following World War II. He made his debut for the county in the Minor Counties Championship against the Yorkshire Second XI. He played Minor counties cricket for Durham from 1947 to 1955, making 59 appearances for the county. He made a single first-class appearance for the Minor Counties against Kent in 1951. In this match, he was dismissed in the Minor Counties first-innings by Brian Edrich for 14 runs, while in their second-innings (in which they followed-on) he scored 12 runs before being dismissed by the same bowler. In Kent's only innings, he took the wicket of Dicky Mayes for the cost of 33 runs from 14 overs. Kent went on to win the match by an innings and 10 runs.

He died on 9 September 1977 at Newton Aycliffe, County Durham.
