= Dick Harrison (cricketer) =

English cricketer (born 1881)

Personal information
- Full name: Richard Harrison
- Born: 1881; Clitheroe, Lancashire, England
- Batting: Left-handed
- Bowling: Right-arm fast-medium

Domestic team information
- Years: Team
- 1912: Minor Counties
- 1910–1913: Durham

Career statistics
Competition	First-class
Matches	1
Runs scored	8
Batting average	–
100s/50s	–/–
Top score	8*
Balls bowled	–
Wickets	–
Bowling average	–
5 wickets in innings	–
10 wickets in match	–
Best bowling	–
Catches/stumpings	–/–
- Source: Cricinfo, 7 September 2011

Richard Harrison (born 1881, date of death unknown) was an English cricketer. He was a left-handed batsman who bowled right-arm fast-medium. Harrison was born in Clitheroe, Lancashire.

Harrison played for Lancashire Second XI from 1906 to 1908. He joined Durham in 1910, making his debut for the county in the 1910 Minor Counties Championship against Northumberland. He played Minor counties cricket for Durham from 1910 to 1913, making 23 appearances. During this period he made a single first-class appearance for the Minor Counties against the touring South Africans in 1912. He batted once in this match, scoring 8 unbeaten runs in the Minor Counties first-innings, before retiring hurt.
