= John Merrall =

English cricketer

Personal information
- Full name: John Edwin Merrall
- Born: 7 January 1909; Shipley, Yorkshire, England
- Died: 5 October 1993 (aged 84); Isle of Man
- Batting: Right-handed
- Bowling: Right-arm fast-medium

Domestic team information
- Years: Team
- 1934: Minor Counties
- 1932–1933: Surrey

Career statistics
Competition	First-class
Matches	3
Runs scored	10
Batting average	5.00
100s/50s	–/–
Top score	5
Balls bowled	474
Wickets	6
Bowling average	33.66
5 wickets in innings	–
10 wickets in match	–
Best bowling	3/24
Catches/stumpings	3/–
- Source: Cricinfo, 17 June 2012

John Edwin Merrall (7 January 1909 – 5 October 1993) was an English cricketer. Merrall was a right-handed batsman who bowled right-arm fast-medium. He was born at Shipley, Yorkshire.

Marrall made two first-class appearances for Surrey, both against Essex in 1931 and 1932, with both matches played at The Oval. He took a total of 6 wickets in his two appearances, which came at an average of 25.50, with best figures of 3/24. He played in the Minor Counties Championship for the Surrey Second XI from 1930 to 1933, making thirteen appearances. Playing for the second XI entitled him to be selected for the Minor Counties cricket team, with Merrall making a single first-class appearance for the team in 1934 against Oxford University at the University Parks. Incidentally he made no appearances for the Surrey Second XI in this season.

He died on the Isle of Man on 5 October 1993.
