= Ultimate Beatles =

Ultimate Beatles (UK Beatles tribute band)
- Origin: London, England
- Genres: Rock; Beatles Tribute UK
- Years active: 2001–present
- Members: Grant Van Funkle; Max Wurr; Cliff Smith; Matt McLaughlin
- Website: Ultimate Beatles

Ultimate Beatles is a UK Beatles tribute band/tribute act based in London/greater London.

The band was formed in 2001 and since then has performed over 1,000 shows to audiences across the UK and internationally, including performances in Holland, Ireland, France, Latvia, and Beirut.

The band performs using authentic instruments, equipment, and costumes to represent the Beatles’ key eras, and draws from a large repertoire of hits by the Beatles when tailoring gigs for audiences.

== Show Format ==
For big ticketed events such as Boogie in the Park (at which the band performed in 2005) or large venues like the Emirates, the band performs an original 2 hour theatrical production that consists of two, three, or four sets of Beatles classics, and involves two, three or four costume changes respectively. The band’s striking authenticity was noted following a theatrical performance in 2015:

“Polished as their musical delivery was, it was far from sterile. Their on-stage chemistry was akin to that of the original foursome, with John and Paul bickering, John teasing George and everyone piling in on Ringo.” (emphasis added).

== Members of the Band ==
Grant Van Funkle (John Lennon) - guitar, keyboards, and vocals
Max Wurr (Paul McCartney) - bass, keyboards, and vocals
Cliff Smith (George Harrison) - guitar and vocals
Matt McLaughlin (Ringo Starr) – drums, percussion, and vocals.

== Recent notable performances ==
The band has performed for a large number of celebrities, including: Ian Botham, Denise Lewis, and Tim Rice. Krishnan Guru-Murthy said of the band, after their performance at his wedding in 2005: "[they] blow other Beatles tribute bands out of the water."

"I think my favourite famous person who we’ve entertained is Anna Friel." Van Funkle a.k.a. Lennon said in an interview in 2015, “She took to the stage when we were singing and was doing some very sexy dancing. She was a lot of fun.”.

In 2008 the band headlined at the Box Moor Trust's biennial music festival, 'Music on the Moor', in front of an audience of 3000.

On 25 September 2013, the band performed Beatles hits on an episode of The One Show, which featured two Beatles fans reuniting after 40 years. The band appeared alongside other guests Mel C and Ronnie Corbett.

On 30 January 2014, the band performed live for Iain Lee on BBC Radio Three Counties.
