= Billy MacKay (cricketer) =

English cricketer (1891–1962)

Personal information
- Full name: William Gilfellon Mackay
- Born: 15 August 1891; Shiremoor, Northumberland, England
- Died: 8 August 1962 (aged 70); High Heaton, Northumberland, England
- Batting: Right-handed

Domestic team information
- Years: Team
- 1929: Minor Counties
- 1920–1939: Northumberland

Career statistics
Competition	First-class
Matches	1
Runs scored	–
Batting average	–
100s/50s	–/–
Top score	–
Balls bowled	–
Wickets	–
Bowling average	–
5 wickets in innings	–
10 wickets in match	–
Best bowling	–
Catches/stumpings	–/–
- Source: Cricinfo, 12 August 2012

William Gilfellon Mackay (15 October 1891 – 8 August 1962) was an English cricketer. MacKay was a right-handed batsman. He was born at Shiremoor, Northumberland.

MacKay made his debut for Northumberland against Durham in the 1920 Minor Counties Championship at Osborne Avenue, Jesmond. He played minor counties cricket for Northumberland from 1920 to 1939, making 146 appearances for the county in the Minor Counties Championship, the last of which came against Norfolk. Playing minor counties cricket for Northumberland allowed MacKay to be selected to play for a combined Minor Counties cricket team, with him making a single first-class appearance for the team against Lancashire at Old Trafford in 1929. Only one innings was possible during the match because of rain, with Lancashire making 370/6 declared.

He died at High Heaton, Northumberland, on 8 August 1962.
