= George W. Rogers Jr. =

American politician

Member of the Mississippi House of Representatives
- In office 1948–1952
- In office 1960s, 1970s

Personal details
- Born: April 5, 1927 Vicksburg, Mississippi
- Died: May 9, 2017 (aged 90)
- Party: Democratic
- Occupation: Lawyer

George W. Rogers Jr. (April 5, 1927 – May 9, 2017) was an American politician.

Rogers was born in Vicksburg, Mississippi, he graduated from Carr Central High School in 1944 and entered the Counter-Intelligence Corps of the U.S. Army. He studied engineering and Japanese for two years, and then served in Japan as part of the occupation force. Upon his return to the United States in 1947, Rogers resumed his education at Yale University, graduating in 1949 with a degree in International Relations. Rogers was awarded a Rhodes Scholarship and studied for his master's degree at Balliol College of Oxford University from 1949 to 1951. He then received a Bachelor of Laws degree from the University of Mississippi Law School in 1954.

Rogers had a distinguished career of public service to the people of Mississippi and to the nation. He represented Vicksburg and the surrounding area in the Mississippi House of Representatives from 1952 to 1977. Believing education to be the key to transforming Mississippi, he rose to become Chairman of the House Education Committee. Among his accomplishments, he worked to increase education funding in Mississippi, focusing on 16th section land income, and to ensure equal educational opportunity for all students through the Minimum Foundation Program, which was subsequently mirrored by many states. He was instrumental in the establishment of the first public television station in Mississippi. As an attorney, Rogers also had the distinction of appearing for the people of Mississippi before the United States Supreme Court in November 1965. The legal case dealt with the official boundary between the states of Mississippi and Louisiana as a result of the shifting course of the Mississippi River and its effect on mineral rights.

George Rogers then answered the call of the nation when President Carter's Director of Central Intelligence asked him to serve on his senior staff. Rogers was the Director of Information Systems Management within the Intelligence Community Staff from 1978 to 1992, serving three administrations with distinction. In April 2017, George was honored with the Rabbi Perry Nussbaum Civil Justice Award, which is dedicated to men and women who have stood against racial bigotry and religious prejudice. After being nominated by William Winter, the former governor of Mississippi, Millsaps College of Jackson, Mississippi chose Rogers to receive the award with this statement: "Your brave persistence in challenging the status quo, your refusal to compromise values for political gain, your farsighted approach to legislative policy, and your lifetime of public service has served as a force for progress in the state of Mississippi and the nation at large."

Rogers served as Deacon and then Elder of the Presbyterian Church for over 60 years, teaching Sunday School, playing in the bell choir, and serving on finance committees.
