= George Milne (cricketer) =

English cricketer

Personal information
- Full name: George Taylor Milne
- Born: 18 January 1877; Newcastle upon Tyne, Northumberland, England
- Died: 3 November 1968 (aged 91); Newcastle upon Tyne, Northumberland, England
- Batting: Left-handed
- Bowling: Slow left-arm orthodox

Domestic team information
- Years: Team
- 1912: Minor Counties
- 1901–1928: Northumberland

Career statistics
| Competition | First-class |
|---|---|
| Matches | 1 |
| Runs scored | 9 |
| Batting average | – |
| 100s/50s | –/– |
| Top score | 9* |
| Balls bowled | – |
| Wickets | – |
| Bowling average | – |
| 5 wickets in innings | – |
| 10 wickets in match | – |
| Best bowling | – |
| Catches/stumpings | –/– |
- Source: Cricinfo, 29 April 2012

George Taylor Milne (18 January 1877 – 3 November 1968) was an English cricketer. Milne was a left-handed batsman who bowled slow left-arm orthodox. He was born at Newcastle upon Tyne, Northumberland.

Taylor made his debut in county cricket for Northumberland in the 1901 Minor Counties Championship against the Yorkshire Second XI. Between 1904 and the start of World War I in 1914, Milne made 81 appearances for Northumberland in the Minor Counties Championship. In 1912, he was selected to play in a combined Minor Counties cricket team for its inaugural appearance in first-class cricket against the touring South Africans at the County Ground, Stoke-on-Trent, in 1912. In what was Milne's only first-class appearance, he batted once in the match, scoring an unbeaten 9 runs in the Minor Counties first-innings as a lower-order batsman. Following World War I, he made 65 further appearances in the Minor Counties Championship for Northumberland, with his final appearance coming against Durham in 1928.

He died at the city of his birth on 3 November 1968.
