= Desmond Rought-Rought =

English cricketer

Personal information
- Full name: Desmond Charles Rought-Rought
- Born: 3 May 1912; Brandon, Suffolk, England
- Died: 7 January 1970 (aged 57); Cambridge, Cambridgeshire, England
- Batting: Right-handed
- Bowling: Right-arm fast-medium
- Relatives: Basil Rought-Rought (brother); Rodney Rought-Rought (brother)

Domestic team information
- Years: Team
- 1935–1939: Minor Counties
- 1934–1937: Cambridge University
- 1931–1947: Norfolk

Career statistics
Competition	First-class
Matches	24
Runs scored	739
Batting average	21.73
100s/50s	–/2
Top score	92
Balls bowled	4,492
Wickets	74
Bowling average	28.77
5 wickets in innings	3
10 wickets in match	1
Best bowling	7/100
Catches/stumpings	16/–
- Source: Cricinfo, 11 October 2015

Desmond Charles Rought-Rought (3 May 1912 – 7 January 1970) was an English cricketer active in first-class cricket from 1934–1947, but was mostly associated with minor counties cricket where he played for Norfolk.

Rought-Rought made his debut for Norfolk in the 1931 Minor Counties Championship against Buckinghamshire at Norwich. He gained experience playing at minor counties level with Norfolk throughout the early 1930s, having his best batting season in 1934 with 381 runs at an average of 34.63, and his best bowling season the following year with 42 wickets at an average of 14.16.

He made his debut in first-class cricket while at Cambridge, debuting in 1934 for Cambridge University against Yorkshire at Fenner's. He also played for the Free Foresters in his second first-class match of 1934 against Cambridge University. Five first-class appearances followed in 1935 (including one for the combined Minor Counties cricket team against Cambridge University), however this dropped to just two in 1936 (one match each for the university and the Free Foresters). Rought-Rought played twelve first-class matches for the university in his Blue year of 1937, scoring 472 runs and taking 42 wickets. He played a total of nineteen first-class matches for Cambridge University as an all-rounder, scoring 568 runs at an average of 21.03, top scoring with 92. With the ball in hand, he took 63 wickets, at an average of 27.96. He took a five wicket haul on three occasions, with best figures of 7/100. His continued association with Norfolk in minor counties cricket led to selection for the second time for the combined Minor Counties team for their first-class fixture against Oxford University at Oxford in 1939. Following the Second World War, Rought-Rought continued to play minor counties cricket for Norfolk until 1947, by which point he had appeared 89 times for the county. He made his last appearance in first-class cricket in 1947 when he was selected to play for the Free Foresters against Cambridge University.

He often played alongside his brothers Rodney and Basil for Norfolk, and both also played at first-class level. The three brothers had long careers for Norfolk, where they encouraged the young Bill Edrich. He later wrote, "many a time they gave me a quiet hint or bit of advice that was invaluable, and which occurred to me many a time afterwards, in the strenuous, hard grind of a Test match".

The family's unusual surname originated with their father, who was born Albert William Rought Whitta. His maternal grandfather William Rought left him the family hatters and furriers business in Brandon on the condition that he adopted the surname Rought. He became Albert William Rought-Rought.

Desmond Rought-Rought died in a car accident in Cambridge on 7 January 1970, which also claimed the life of his wife.
