= Randal Woollatt =

English cricketer

Personal information
- Full name: Randal James Woollatt
- Born: 19 July 1909; Claygate, Surrey, England
- Died: 9 April 1984 (aged 74); Cheltenham, Gloucestershire, England
- Batting: Right-handed

Domestic team information
- Years: Team
- 1930: Minor Counties

Career statistics
Competition	First-class
Matches	1
Runs scored	13
Batting average	13.00
100s/50s	0/0
Top score	13
Catches/stumpings	0/–
- Source: Cricinfo, 3 May 2012

Randal James Woollatt (19 July 1909 – 9 April 1984) was an English cricketer who played as a right-handed batsman. He was born at Claygate, Surrey, and was educated at Cheltenham College.

Woollatt made his debut for the Surrey Second XI in the 1929 Minor Counties Championship against Devon. From 1929 to 1932, Woollatt made 22 appearances for the team in the Minor Counties Championship, the last of which came against the Kent Second XI. In 1930, he made his only appearance in first-class cricket for a combined Minor Counties team against Lancashire at Old Trafford. Batting first, the Minor Counties made 216 all out, with Woollatt making 13 runs before he was dismissed by Len Hopwood. Lancashire were then dismissed for 188 in their first-innings, to which the Minor Counties responded in their second-innings by reaching 9 without loss, before the match was declared a draw, with no play possible on the final day. Woollatt never appeared for the Surrey first eleven in first-class cricket.

He died at Cheltenham, Gloucestershire, on 9 April 1984.
