= Jim Smith (cricketer, born 1906) =

English cricketer (1906–1979)

- Smith in 1936

Personal information
- Full name: Cedric Ivan James Smith
- Born: 25 August 1906; Corsham, Wiltshire
- Died: 8 February 1979 (aged 72); Mellor, Lancashire
- Batting: Right-handed
- Bowling: Right-arm fast
- Relatives: William Smith (brother)

International information
- National side: England
- Test debut: 8 January 1935 v West Indies
- Last Test: 24 July 1937 v New Zealand

Career statistics
Competition	Tests	First-class
Matches	5	208
Runs scored	102	4,007
Batting average	10.19	14.67
100s/50s	0/0	1/15
Top score	27	101*
Balls bowled	930	43,058
Wickets	15	845
Bowling average	26.19	19.25
5 wickets in innings	1	47
10 wickets in match	0	8
Best bowling	5/16	8/102
Catches/stumpings	1/–	98/–
- Source: CricketArchive, 30 May 2010

Cedric Ivan James Smith (25 August 1906 – 8 February 1979) was an English cricketer who played in five Test matches for the England cricket team between 1935 and 1937.

== Career ==
Known as "Big Jim", Smith joined the Marylebone Cricket Club (MCC) ground staff in 1926 and played for Wiltshire until 1933. He qualified for Middlesex in 1934 and took 172 wickets at 18.88 to finish 6th in the bowling averages in his debut season. He was selected for the 1934–35 MCC tour of the West Indies on the strength of this performance and played in every Test there. On debut, he took five wickets in the second innings in Bridgetown. He also appeared for England against New Zealand at Old Trafford in 1937. Smith only batted 10 times in Tests, but until his last innings he never batted in the same position in two successive innings. During his brief career he batted at numbers 2, 3, 4, 5, 6, 8, 9 (twice) and 10 (twice).

In 1935, Smith was elected one of the Wisden Cricketers of the Year for his achievements in the 1934 season.

A six-foot four inch fast bowler, Smith's accuracy and appetite for hard work earned him 676 career wickets at 17.75 before the onset of World War II effectively ended his career.

Although primarily a fast bowler, Smith earned a reputation as a big-hitting tail-ender. In 1938, he scored a half-century in just 11 minutes against Gloucestershire at Bristol, the fastest genuine fifty on record. Previously, in 1935, he had scored 50 in 14 minutes against Kent while his sole first-class century, an unbeaten 101, was scored in 81 minutes, also against Kent. Another achievement was being credited by some with the biggest six in history, at Lord's in 1937, when he played a shot that cleared the Old Grandstand on the north side of the ground.

His older brother, William, also played first-class cricket.
