= Nigel Moore (cricketer) =

English cricketer

Personal information
- Full name: Nigel Harold Moore
- Born: 20 April 1930; Norwich, Norfolk, England
- Died: 24 December 2003 (aged 73); Norwich, Norfolk, England
- Batting: Right-handed
- Bowling: Right-arm fast-medium

Domestic team information
- Years: Team
- 1960: Minor Counties
- 1952: Cambridge University
- 1947–1964: Norfolk

Career statistics
Competition	First-class
Matches	4
Runs scored	139
Batting average	23.16
100s/50s	–/2
Top score	59
Balls bowled	–
Wickets	–
Bowling average	–
5 wickets in innings	–
10 wickets in match	–
Best bowling	–
Catches/stumpings	2/–
- Source: Cricinfo, 9 July 2012

Nigel Harold Moore (20 April 1930 – 24 December 2003) was an English cricketer. Moore was a right-handed batsman who bowled right-arm fast-medium. He was born at Norwich, Norfolk.

Moore made his debut for Norfolk against Hertfordshire in the 1947 Minor Counties Championship. He made two further appearances for the county in 1947, before making his next appearance in 1950. While studying at the University of Cambridge in 1952, Moore made his first-class debut against Leicestershire at Fenner's. He made two further first-class appearances in that season for the university, both at Fenner's, against Sussex and Essex. He scored 70 runs in his three matches, which came at an average of 17.50, with a high score of 51. This score came against Sussex. He gained a Blue in golf while studying at Cambridge.

While undertaking his studies he continued to play for minor counties cricket for Norfolk, with him being a regular feature in the Norfolk side of the fifties. Playing for Norfolk allowed him to be selected to represent a combined Minor Counties cricket team in a first-class match against the touring South Africans at Longton Cricket Club Ground, Stoke-on-Trent, in 1960. He was dismissed for 10 runs in the Minor Counties first-innings by Neil Adcock, while in their second-innings he made a half century, scoring 59 runs before he was dismissed by Hugh Tayfield. He continued to play minor counties cricket for Norfolk until 1964, with his final appearance coming against Cambridgeshire. He made a total of 95 Minor Counties Championship appearances. He was described by his Norfolk teammate Henry Blofeld as "a jolly good competitor, an enormously strong man who was a formidable striker of the ball and bowled a sharpish fast-medium."

He died at the city of his birth on 24 December 2003.
