= Ian Mercer (cricketer) =

English cricketer

Personal information
- Full name: Ian Pickford Mercer
- Born: 30 May 1930; Oldham, Lancashire, England
- Died: May 2004 (aged 73); North Walsham, Norfolk, England
- Batting: Right-handed
- Bowling: Right-arm medium

Domestic team information
- Years: Team
- 1964–1972: Norfolk

Career statistics
Competition	First-class	List A
Matches	1	4
Runs scored	1	81
Batting average	0.50	20.25
100s/50s	0/0	0/0
Top score	1	31
Balls bowled	0	12
Wickets	–	0
Bowling average	–	–
5 wickets in innings	–	0
10 wickets in match	–	0
Best bowling	–	–
Catches/stumpings	1/–	1/–
- Source: CricInfo, 30 June 2011

Ian Pickford Mercer (30 May 1930 – May 2004) was an English cricketer. Mercer was a right-handed batsman who bowled right-arm medium pace. He was born in Oldham, Lancashire.

Mercer made his debut for Norfolk in the 1964 Minor Counties Championship against Cambridgeshire. Mercer played Minor counties cricket for Norfolk from 1964 to 1972, which included 74 appearances in the Minor Counties Championship. He made his List A debut against Hampshire in the 1965 Gillette Cup. He made 3 further List A appearances, the last coming against Middlesex in the 1970 Gillette Cup. In his 4 List A matches, he scored 81 runs at a batting average of 20.25, with a high score of 31.

In 1965, he made a single first-class appearance for the Minor Counties cricket team against the touring South Africans. In this match, he was dismissed for a duck by Jackie Botten, while in their second-innings he scored a single run before being dismissed by Atholl McKinnon.

He died in May 2004 in North Walsham, Norfolk.
