= George Rogers (Surrey cricketer) =

English cricketer

Personal information
- Full name: George Russell Rogers
- Born: 20 April 1847; Brixton, Surrey, England
- Died: 14 December 1905 (aged 58); Kensington, London, England
- Batting: Right-handed

Domestic team information
- Years: Team
- 1870: Surrey

Career statistics
| Competition | First-class |
|---|---|
| Matches | 5 |
| Runs scored | 34 |
| Batting average | 3.77 |
| 100s/50s | –/– |
| Top score | 18 |
| Catches/stumpings | 2/– |
- Source: Cricinfo, 14 January 2012

George Russell Rogers (20 April 1847 – 14 December 1905) was an English cricketer. Rogers was a right-handed batsman. He was born at Brixton, Surrey.

Rogers made his first-class debut for Surrey against Yorkshire in 1870. He made four further first-class appearances for Surrey in that season, the last of which came against Middlesex. In his five first-class matches, he scored a total of 34 runs at an average of 3.77, with a high score of 18.

He died at Kensington, London on 14 December 1905.
