= Harry Robson =

English cricketer

Personal information
- Full name: Henry Robson
- Born: 1 August 1904; Perkinsville, County Durham, England
- Died: 31 August 1968 (aged 64); Chester-le-Street, County Durham, England
- Batting: Left-handed
- Bowling: Slow left-arm orthodox

Domestic team information
- Years: Team
- 1939: Minor Counties
- 1932–1949: Northumberland

Career statistics
Competition	First-class
Matches	1
Runs scored	3
Batting average	3.00
100s/50s	–/–
Top score	3
Balls bowled	200
Wickets	4
Bowling average	31.00
5 wickets in innings	–
10 wickets in match	–
Best bowling	4/80
Catches/stumpings	–/–
- Source: Cricinfo, 16 August 2012

Henry 'Harry' Robson (1 August 1904 – 31 August 1968) was an English cricketer. Robson was a left-handed batsman who bowled slow left-arm orthodox. He was born at Perkinsville, County Durham.

Robson qualified to play for Northumberland through his residence in the county, making his debut for it against Durham in the 1932 Minor Counties Championship. Before World War II, Robson made 65 appearances for the county in the Minor Counties Championship. Playing minor counties cricket for Northumberland allowed Robson to be selected to play for a representative Minor Counties cricket team, making a single first-class appearance for the team against the touring West Indians at Lord's in 1939. The West Indians won the toss and elected to bat first, making 370 all out, with Robson taking the wickets of Vic Stollmeyer, Jeff Stollmeyer, Gerry Gomez and Foffie Williams, to finish with figures of 4/80 from sixteen overs, which were also the best bowling figures in the innings. The Minor Counties then made 306 all out in their first-innings, with Robson the last man out when he was dismissed for 3 runs by Rolph Grant. The West Indians then reached 138/4 in their second-innings, in which Robson bowled nine wicketless overs for the cost of 44 runs, with the match declared a draw at this point.

After World War II, Robson returned to playing minor counties cricket for Northumberland, making an additional 24 appearances in the Minor Counties Championship, the last of which came against the Yorkshire Second XI in 1949. Described by Wisden as "one of the best spin bowlers ever produced by the North East of England", he took over 300 wickets for Northumberland, with his most successful season coming in 1939 when he took 48 wickets at an average of 19.31. He also played cricket in the Lancashire League for Haslingden. Outside of cricket, he worked as a plumber. He died at Chester-le-Street, County Durham, on 31 August 1968.
