= George Rogers (cricketer, born 1815) =

English cricketer

Personal information
- Full name: George John Rogers
- Born: 1 May 1815; Hackney, Middlesex, England
- Died: 2 September 1870 (aged 55); Holloway, London, England
- Batting: Right-handed

Domestic team information
- Years: Team
- 1850–1851: Middlesex

Career statistics
Competition	First-class
Matches	9
Runs scored	116
Batting average	8.28
100s/50s	–/–
Top score	36
Balls bowled	0
Wickets	–
Bowling average	–
5 wickets in innings	–
10 wickets in match	–
Best bowling	–
Catches/stumpings	9/-
- Source: Cricinfo, 23 December 2018

George John Rogers (1 May 1815 – 2 September 1870) was an English first-class cricketer.

Born at Hackney, Rogers made his debut in first-class cricket for Middlesex against Surrey County Cricket Club at Lord's in 1850. Rogers played in two further first-class matches in 1850, playing for Middlesex against Surrey in the repeat fixture at The Oval, as well as representing the Over 36s against the Under 36s. The following season he played for a Marylebone Cricket Club and Metropolitan Clubs team against an All England Eleven, alongside playing for Middlesex against the Marylebone Cricket Club (MCC), and for the Over 30s against the Under 30s. In 1852 he played two matches for the Surrey Club, both against the MCC, before playing in a final first-class match in 1854 in a repeat of those fixtures. In nine first-class matches, Rogers scored 116 runs at an average of 8.28, with a highest score of 36. He died at Holloway in September 1870.
