= Roger Busby =

English cricketer

Personal information
- Full name: Roger Neil Busby
- Born: 18 September 1946 (age 80); Oxford, Oxfordshire, England
- Batting: Right-handed
- Bowling: Right-arm fast-medium

Domestic team information
- Years: Team
- 1987–1988: Minor Counties
- 1973–1989: Oxfordshire

Career statistics
Competition	List A
Matches	12
Runs scored	55
Batting average	9.16
100s/50s	–/–
Top score	22
Balls bowled	732
Wickets	7
Bowling average	59.14
5 wickets in innings	–
10 wickets in match	–
Best bowling	1/15
Catches/stumpings	5/–
- Source: Cricinfo, 24 May 2011

Roger Neil Busby (born 18 September 1946) is a former English cricketer. Busby was a right-handed batsman who bowled right-arm fast-medium. He was born in Oxford, Oxfordshire.

Busby made his debut for Oxfordshire in the 1973 Minor Counties Championship against Buckinghamshire. Busby played Minor counties cricket for Oxfordshire from 1973 to 1989, which included 113 Minor Counties Championship matches and 9 MCCA Knockout Trophy matches. He made his List A debut against Cornwall in the 1975 Gillette Cup. He played 9 further List A matches for Oxfordshire, the last coming against Leicestershire in the 1987 NatWest Trophy. In his 9 List A matches for Oxfordshire, he scored 46 runs at a batting average of 9.20, with a high score of 22. With the ball, he took 5 wickets at a bowling average of 63.40, with best figures of 1/15.

Playing for Oxfordshire entitled him to represent the Minor Counties cricket team. He made his debut for the team in a List A match against Glamorgan in the 1987 Benson & Hedges Cup. He played 2 further List A matches for the team, both coming in the 1988 Benson & Hedges Cup against Northamptonshire and Yorkshire. In total, Busby played 12 List A matches. In these he scored 55 runs at an average of 9.16, with a high score of 22. With the ball, he took a total of 7 wickets at an average of 59.14, with best figures of 1/15.
