= William Cook (Surrey cricketer) =

English cricketer

Personal information
- Full name: William Thomas Cook
- Born: 6 December 1891; Walworth, London
- Died: 22 September 1969 (aged 77); Shirley, London
- Batting: Left-handed
- Bowling: Right-arm medium

Domestic team information
- Years: Team
- 1921–1933: Surrey
- Source: Cricinfo, 12 March 2017

William Thomas Cook (6 December 1891 – 22 September 1969) was an English cricketer. He played 39 first-class matches between 1921 and 1933, mainly for Surrey County Cricket Club.

Born at Walworth in 1891, Cook has what Wisden described as "a life-long association with Surrey cricket". Although between 1921 and 1933 he only made 32 first-class appearances for the side, he was awarded his county cap in 1924 and captained the county's Second XI "with distinction for many years".

Considered a "left-handed batsman of no mean skill", Cook played at a time when Surrey's batting was "immensely strong". Professionally he worked in the civil service, and this made it difficult for him to play county cricket regularly. He made seven appearances for Surrey in 1921, ten in 1924, and five in 1926, but otherwise did not play for the First XI more than three times in a season at any point; during 1923 and 1925 he did not play at all for the senior side. He scored 1,441 first-class runs, 1,032 of which were for Surrey, and made six half-centuries.

Cook was, however, able to find time for the shorter Minor Counties Championship matches that the county Second XI played, making 154 appearances in the competition for Surrey between 1920 and 1935. He scored 7,771 Championship runs, making centuries in every season between 1920 and 1933 other than in 1924. He also played club cricket for civil service sides.

As well as his 32 first-class appearances for Surrey, Cook played five first-class matches for Minor Counties sides, including against the touring West Indians in 1928, the South Africans in 1929, and the New Zealanders in 1931. His highest first-class score of 92 came for Minor Counties against the South Africans at Stoke-on-Trent. He played other first-class matches for the Civil Service against the touring New Zealanders in 1927―the only first-class match the Civil Service played―and for the Gentlemen against the Players at The Oval in 1932.

A member of the Surrey committee for most of the period between 1932 and 1968, Wisden considered that Cook's most significant contribution to Surrey was his role in the appointment of Stuart Surridge as captain in 1952. Surrey went on to win five successive County Championships.

Cook died at Shirley in London in 1969. He was aged 77.
