= William Smith (cricketer, born 1900) =

English cricketer

Personal information
- Full name: William Alfred Smith
- Born: 29 September 1900; Corsham, Wiltshire, England
- Died: 6 January 1990 (aged 89); Trowbridge, Wiltshire, England
- Batting: Right-handed
- Bowling: Right-arm fast-medium
- Relatives: Jim Smith (younger brother)

Domestic team information
- Years: Team
- 1935–1936: Minor Counties
- 1929–1939: Wiltshire

Career statistics
Competition	First-class
Matches	2
Runs scored	47
Batting average	15.66
100s/50s	–/–
Top score	35
Balls bowled	438
Wickets	9
Bowling average	23.11
5 wickets in innings	1
10 wickets in match	–
Best bowling	5/95
Catches/stumpings	1/–
- Source: Cricinfo, 4 May 2012

William Alfred Smith (29 September 1900 – 6 January 1990) was an English cricketer and footballer.

== Cricket ==
Smith was a right-handed batsman who bowled right-arm fast-medium. Playing as a defender He was born in Corsham, Wiltshire.

Smith made his debut in county cricket for Wiltshire in the 1929 Minor Counties Championship against the Surrey Second XI. From 1929 to 1939, Smith made 89 appearances for Wiltshire in the Minor Counties Championship, the last of which came against Dorset. In his career with Wiltshire he took 387 wickets at an average of 16.84. In 1935, Smith made his first-class debut for a combined Minor Counties team against the touring South Africans at Richmond Drive, Skegness. Batting first, the South Africans made 394 all out, with Smith taking the wickets of Eric Rowan and Dudley Nourse, finishing with figures of 2/97 from 28 overs. Responding in their first-innings, the Minor Counties made 190 all out, during which Smith, who batted at number eleven, ended the innings not out on 7. Forced to follow-on in their second-innings, the Minor Counties made 224 all out, with Smith the last man out when he was dismissed for a single run by Arthur Langton. The South Africans reached their target in their second-innings for the loss of two wickets, with Smith taking both wickets to fall, those of Langton and Robert Williams, with figures of 2/10 from two overs. The following season he made a second and final first-class appearance for the Minor Counties against Oxford University at the University Parks. Batting first, the Minor Counties made 251 all out, with Smith the last man out when he was dismissed for 35 runs by Tristan Ballance. In response, Oxford University made 288 all out in their first-innings, with Smith playing a major part with the ball, taking five wickets to finish with figures of 5/95 from 35 overs. In their second-innings, the Minor Counties made 294 all out, with Smith again the last man out, this time dismissed for 4 runs, with Ballance again taking his wicket. Oxford University reached 23 without loss in their second-innings, with the match declared a draw.

He died at Trowbridge, Wiltshire, on 6 January 1990. His younger brother, Jim, played Test cricket for England.

== Football ==
Smith also made appearances for Football League clubs Notts County and West Ham United before becoming a cricketer.

William Smith
Senior career*
Years	Team	Apps	(Gls)
1923-1927	Notts County	21	(1)
1927-1929	West Ham United	3	(0)
- * Club domestic league appearances and goals

Playing as a defender, Smith made his top-flight debut for newly-promoted Notts County on 1 March 1924, starting in a 1-1 draw against West Ham at Meadow Lane. His second and final appearance of the 1923-24 season came against the same opposition a week later.

Smith made two further appearances for Notts County in the 1924-25 season, before establishing himself in the side the following campaign with 17 league appearances, the most he would manage in his career.

On 5 April 1926, Smith scored his only league goal from the penalty spot to seal a 0-1 Notts County win over Manchester United at Old Trafford.

Notts County finished the 1926-27 season bottom of the First Division and were relegated to Division Two.

Smith's next top flight appearance did not arrive until almost 18 months later, when he featured for West Ham against Manchester United at the Boleyn Ground.

The defender made one further appearance for the Hammers in January 1928, before playing his final First Division game a year later against Aston Villa in 1929.
