= Tommy Maxwell (ice hockey) =

American ice hockey player

- Born: November 19, 1985 (age 40) Spokane, Washington, U.S.
- Height: 6 ft 2 in (188 cm)
- Weight: 200 lb (91 kg; 14 st 4 lb)
- Position: Right wing
- Shoots: Right
- ECHL team Former teams: Utah Grizzlies; Hershey Bears; Manitoba Moose; St. John's IceCaps
- NHL draft: Undrafted
- Playing career: 2007–present

Tommy Maxwell (born November 19, 1985) is an American ice hockey right winger. He currently plays for the Rapid City Rush of the ECHL.

== Career ==
In the 2011–12 season, Maxwell signed a one-year contract with the St. John's IceCaps on October 26, 2011. He was then reassigned and split the year between the IceCaps and ECHL affiliate the Colorado Eagles. On September 12, 2012, Maxwell signed with ECHL rival the Utah Grizzlies for a one-year deal.

== Career statistics ==
			Regular season					Playoffs
Season	Team	League	GP	G	A	Pts	PIM	GP	G	A	Pts	PIM
2002–03	Medicine Hat Tigers	WHL	54	3	5	8	63	11	0	0	0	18
2003–04	Medicine Hat Tigers	WHL	64	5	5	10	109	20	0	1	1	9
2004–05	Medicine Hat Tigers	WHL	66	10	22	32	147	13	0	1	1	19
2005–06	Medicine Hat Tigers	WHL	60	15	8	23	147	13	1	5	6	17
2006–07	Phoenix RoadRunners	ECHL	53	5	8	13	213	4	1	1	2	4
2007–08	South Carolina Stingrays	ECHL	9	1	2	3	28	—	—	—	—	—
2007–08	Hershey Bears	AHL	9	0	1	1	44	—	—	—	—	—
2008–09	South Carolina Stingrays	ECHL	25	4	5	9	83	—	—	—	—	—
2008–09	Manitoba Moose	AHL	36	1	4	5	72	1	0	0	0	0
2009–10	Manitoba Moose	AHL	67	2	9	11	256	2	0	0	0	0
2010–11	Manitoba Moose	AHL	39	4	0	4	60	—	—	—	—	—
2010–11	Victoria Salmon Kings	ECHL	9	0	0	0	25	11	1	1	2	28
2011–12	Colorado Eagles	ECHL	41	2	9	11	146	—	—	—	—	—
2011–12	St. John's IceCaps	AHL	4	0	0	0	10	—	—	—	—	—
2012–13	Utah Grizzlies	ECHL	50	5	10	15	227	—	—	—	—	—
AHL totals			155	7	14	21	442	3	0	0	0	0
