= Eric Stroud =

English cricketer

Eric Gundry Stroud (11 July 1904 – 14 August 1944) was an English first-class cricketer active 1929–33 who played for Surrey. He was born in Caterham; died in Farnham.
