= Walter Beadsmoore =

English cricketer

Personal information
- Full name: Walter Arthur Beadsmoore
- Born: 15 October 1891; Basford, Nottinghamshire, England
- Died: 13 April 1964 (aged 72); Watford, Hertfordshire, England
- Batting: Left-handed
- Bowling: Slow left-arm orthodox

Domestic team information
- Years: Team
- 1924: Minor Counties
- 1921–1931: Norfolk

Career statistics
Competition	First-class
Matches	1
Runs scored	10
Batting average	10.00
100s/50s	0/0
Top score	7
Balls bowled	124
Wickets	5
Bowling average	11.00
5 wickets in innings	0
10 wickets in match	0
Best bowling	4/53
Catches/stumpings	0/–
- Source: Cricinfo, 1 May 2012

Walter Arthur Beadsmoore (15 October 1891 – 13 April 1964) was an English cricketer. Beadsmoore was a left-handed batsman who bowled slow left-arm orthodox. He was born at Basford, Nottinghamshire.

Beadsmoore made his debut in county cricket for Norfolk in the 1921 Minor Counties Championship against Staffordshire. From 1921 to 1931, Beadsmoore made 74 appearances for the county in the Minor Counties Championship, the last of which came against Lincolnshire. In 1924, he made his only appearance in first-class cricket for a combined Minor Counties team against the touring South Africans at the County Ground, Lakenham. Batting first, the Minor Counties made 196 all out, with Beadsmoore scoring 7 runs at number eleven, before being dismissed by Sid Pegler. The South Africans responded in their first-innings with 149 all out, with Beadsmoore taking the final wicket to fall in that innings, that of Claude Carter, to finish with figures of 1/2 from 0.4 overs. In their second-innings, the Minor Counties made 272 all out, with Beadsmoore ending the innings not out on 3. In their second-innings chase, the South Africans were dismissed for 294, with Beadsmore finishing figures of 4/53 from 20 overs, giving the Minor Counties a famous victory by 25 runs.

He died at Watford, Hertfordshire, on 13 April 1964.
