= Montague Bennett =

English cricketer

Personal information
- Full name: Montague Valentine Bennett
- Born: 19 February 1912; Glentham, Lincolnshire, England
- Died: 17 December 1940 (aged 28); HMS Acheron, off the Isle of Wight, England
- Batting: Unknown
- Bowling: Unknown-arm fast-medium

Domestic team information
- Years: Team
- 1935: Minor Counties
- 1932–1939: Lincolnshire

Career statistics
Competition	First-class
Matches	1
Runs scored	22
Batting average	22.00
100s/50s	–/–
Top score	16*
Balls bowled	138
Wickets	2
Bowling average	27.00
5 wickets in innings	–
10 wickets in match	–
Best bowling	2/27
Catches/stumpings	2/–
- Source: Cricinfo, 5 October 2013

Montague Valentine Bennett (19 February 1912 – 17 December 1940) was an English cricketer. Bennett's batting style is unknown, though it is known he was a fast-medium bowler.

Born at Glentham, Lincolnshire, Bennett made his debut for Lincolnshire against the Warwickshire Second XI in the 1932 Minor Counties Championship, establishing himself as a regular in the Lincolnshire team in the following seasons. He was selected to play for a combined Minor Counties cricket team in 1935 in a first-class match against Cambridge University at Fenner's. In a match which Cambridge University won by 4 wickets, Bennett ended the Minor Counties first-innings unbeaten on 16, while in Cambridge University's first-innings he bowled nine wicketless overs, conceding 27 runs. Batting in the Minor Counties second-innings, he was dismissed for 6 runs by John Cameron, while in the university second-innings he took the wickets of Mark Tindall and Hugh Bartlett, to finish with figures of 2/27 from fourteen overs. He continued to play minor counties cricket for Lincolnshire until 1939, making a total of 59 appearances for the county.

Bennett served as an Ordinary Coder in the Royal Navy during World War II, and was killed aboard HMS Acheron after it struck a mine off of the coast of the Isle of Wight on the night of 17 December 1940.
