= George Heron Milne =

American librarian

- Born: July 3, 1887; Washington, D.C.
- Died: October 25, 1948 (aged 61); Bethesda, Maryland
- Occupation: librarian

George Heron Milne (3 July 1887 – October 25, 1948) was an American librarian. He worked at the Library of Congress for 39 years and was chief of the Congressional Reading Room from 1937 to 1948. He served as librarian for many years at the Cosmos Club in Washington, D.C.

== Early life ==
Milne was born in Washington, D.C., to interior decorator Alexander Milne (1847–1927) and Isabella Metcalf Milne (1854–1922). His father had emigrated from Aberdeen and became a recognized authority on old colony furniture, in charge of decorating the catafalque on which President William McKinley rested while lying in state in 1901. He married Ella Baldwin Lower of Cleveland, Ohio, on May 30, 1917, and they lived in Silver Spring, Maryland.

== Career ==
Milne worked as a messenger for The Evening Star newspaper from 1902 to 1905 and then was employed by the Philip T. Hall haberdashery firm from 1906 to 1909. He was hired as a messenger by the Library of Congress in November 1909, and served in the general reading room and moved on to stack attendant. In 1917, he was transferred to the congressional reading room and became chief there in 1937.

As a boy, Milne would trek through the woodlands near Washington, D.C., in search of species of plants not generally known. In later life, Milne was said to have known the names of all domestic flowers and plants and most wildflowers and could spot them at a glance. Rep. Daniel A. Reed of New York said that Milne, as a child, visited the White House on many occasions with his father and “developed a mutual friendship” with the children of President Theodore Roosevelt.

Milne was appreciated for his work with Congress. Rep. Brooks Hays of Arkansas said, “The number of Members he personally assisted in the 31 years of his service... must almost equal the number who have served in the Congress during that time. His quiet telephone voice has been known to virtually every member of Congress and certainly to every secretary on Capitol Hill.... [U]ntil one week before his death, George Milne, day and night, year in and year out, served the Congress with a devotion, a vigor and a technical skill which has seldom been equaled.”

Late in Milne's career, the Director of Legislative Reference Services (now Congressional Research Service) wrote, "Mr. Milne is almost ideal as custodian of the congressional reading room. He makes the problems of Members of Congress his own and gives them the kind of superservice that they greatly appreciate ... his spirit and devotion to his work are almost too much and are sometimes carried to the detriment of his health."

Milne and Henry Eastman Lower published a series of pamphlets, "The Dramatic Books and Plays in English Published During 1913," and for the three subsequent years which were well-reviewed by H. L. Mencken.

== Death and legacy ==
Milne died in Suburban Hospital after a heart attack. He is buried in Lake View Cemetery in Cleveland, Ohio.
