= Leslie M. Baker Jr. =

American banker

Leslie M. "Bud" Baker Jr. was the president and chief executive officer of Wachovia Corporation, the 4th largest bank in the U.S. He retired from Wachovia after 34 years with the company. He is currently on the board of directors of Marsh & McLennan Companies, Inc. (MMC).

== Background ==
Baker is a former United States Marine Corps captain (1964–1967). He graduated from the University of Richmond in 1964 with a degree in English literature; and received an MBA from the University of Virginia in 1969.
