= Ronald Dutton =

English cricketer

Personal information
- Full name: Ronald Moore Dutton
- Born: 24 November 1902; Tattenhall, Cheshire, England
- Died: 25 March 1999 (aged 96); Jersey
- Batting: Left-handed
- Bowling: Left-arm (unknown style)

Domestic team information
- Years: Team
- 1936–1937: Minor Counties
- 1926–1951: Cheshire

Career statistics
| Competition | First-class |
|---|---|
| Matches | 2 |
| Runs scored | 160 |
| Batting average | 40.00 |
| 100s/50s | –/1 |
| Top score | 56 |
| Balls bowled | 78 |
| Wickets | – |
| Bowling average | – |
| 5 wickets in innings | – |
| 10 wickets in match | – |
| Best bowling | – |
| Catches/stumpings | 1/– |
- Source: Cricinfo, 22 May 2012

Ronald Moore Dutton (24 November 1902 – 25 March 1999) was an English cricketer. Dutton was a left-handed batsman who bowled with his left-arm, though his exact bowling style is unknown. He was born at Tattenhall, Cheshire, and was educated at Oakham School.

Dutton made his debut in county cricket for Cheshire against Staffordshire in the 1926 Minor Counties Championship. Prior to the start of World War II in 1939, Dutton made 73 appearances for the county in the Minor Counties Championship. In 1936, he was selected to play a first-class match for a combined Minor Counties cricket team against Oxford University at the University Parks. Batting first, the Minor Counties made 251 all out, with Dutton scoring 44 runs before he was dismissed by Tristan Ballance. In response, Oxford University made 288 all out, to which the Minor Counties then responded to in their second-innings with 294 all out, with Dutton dismissed by Bill Murray-Wood for 56. The match ended as a draw. He made a second first-class appearance for the team the following year against the same opponents and at the same venue. The Minor Counties once again batted first, making 195 all out, with Dutton being dismissed for 26 by Ballance. Oxford University then made 307 all out in their first-innings, before the Minor Counties responded with 257 all out in their second-innings, with Dutton being dismissed once more by Ballance, this time for 34. Oxford University reached 146/4 in their second-innings, winning by 6 wickets. Following the war, he returned to playing minor counties cricket for Cheshire, making five further appearances for the county in the Minor Counties Championship, the last of which came against the Worcestershire Second XI in 1951.

Outside of cricket he worked as a solicitor in Chester, in partnership at one point with a firm called Mason & Moore Dutton. He died at Jersey, on 25 March 1999.
