= Vic Lund =

English cricketer (1902–1971)

Personal information
- Full name: Edward Victor Lund
- Born: 29 April 1902; Eton, Buckinghamshire, England
- Died: 20 February 1971 (aged 68); Cippenham, Buckinghamshire, England
- Batting: Right-handed
- Bowling: Right-arm medium

Domestic team information
- Years: Team
- 1937: Minor Counties
- 1929–1947: Buckinghamshire

Career statistics
Competition	First-class
Matches	1
Runs scored	5
Batting average	2.50
100s/50s	–/–
Top score	4
Balls bowled	180
Wickets	3
Bowling average	31.33
5 wickets in innings	–
10 wickets in match	–
Best bowling	2/78
Catches/stumpings	–/–
- Source: Cricinfo, 14 May 2011

Edward Victor Lund (28 April 1902 – 20 February 1971) was an English cricketer. Lund was a right-handed batsman who bowled right-arm medium pace. He was born in Eton, Buckinghamshire.

Lund made his debut for Buckinghamshire in the 1929 Minor Counties Championship against the Kent Second XI. He played Minor counties cricket for Buckinghamshire from 1929 to 1939, and after the Second World War from 1946 to 1947, making 42 appearances.

He later made his only first-class appearance for a combined Minor Counties cricket team against the touring New Zealanders in 1937. In the Minor Counties first-innings he was dismissed for 2 by Norman Gallichan. In their second-innings, he scored a single run before being dismissed by Bill Carson. Lund took 2 wickets in the New Zealanders first-innings, those of Walter Hadlee and Merv Wallace. In the New Zealanders second-innings, he took just the wicket of Jack Lamason. His 3 wickets came at a cost 94 runs, leaving him with a bowling average of 31.33.

He died in Cippenham, Buckinghamshire on 20 February 1971.
