= Michael Magill =

English cricketer and British Army officer

Personal information
- Full name: Michael Desmond Ponsonby Magill
- Born: 28 September 1915; Sevenoaks, Kent, England
- Died: 5 September 1940 (aged 24); Filey, Yorkshire, England
- Batting: Right-handed
- Bowling: Right-arm fast-medium

Domestic team information
- Years: Team
- 1938: Oxford University
- 1939: Berkshire

Career statistics
Competition	First-class
Matches	6
Runs scored	160
Batting average	22.85
100s/50s	–/1
Top score	80
Balls bowled	630
Wickets	7
Bowling average	41.57
5 wickets in innings	1
10 wickets in match	–
Best bowling	5/57
Catches/stumpings	3/–
- Source: Cricinfo, 15 January 2019

Michael Desmond Ponsonby Magill (28 September 1915 – 5 September 1940) was an English first-class cricketer and British Army officer. Whilst a student he played for the Oxford University Cricket Club against the Minor Counties and Leicestershire. Magill later played a single game for the Free Foresters and made two appearances for the combined Oxford and Cambridge Universities cricket team in the West Indies.

Magill had been active in the Officers' Training Corps at Oxford and later joined the Royal Berkshire Regiment as an officer. He was killed while training in Yorkshire during the Second World War, having stood on a land mine.

== Early life ==
Magill was born at Sevenoaks on 28 September 1915. He was educated at Eton College, before going up to Brasenose College, Oxford. He made his debut in first-class cricket for Oxford University against the Minor Counties cricket team at Oxford in 1938. Magill took a five wicket haul on debut, with 5/57 in the Minor Counties first-innings, figures which helped to contribute toward an Oxford University victory by 230 runs. He made a further appearance in first-class matches for Oxford University in 1938 against Leicestershire, in which he made a score of 80. Magill also made a first-class appearance for the Free Foresters against Oxford University in June 1938. He toured the West Indies with a combined Oxford and Cambridge Universities cricket team in August 1938, making two first-class appearances against Jamaica.

== Army career ==
While studying at Brasenose College he was a member of the Oxford Contingent of the Officers' Training Corps. Magill served in that unit's cavalry section and was promoted to second lieutenant on 1 March 1937. He resigned his commission on 4 July 1938 but transferred to the main British Army General List of Officers in his previous rank on 26 December 1938.

In June 1939, Magill made his sixth and final appearance in first-class cricket for the British Army cricket team against Cambridge University at Fenner's. In August 1939 he played one minor counties match for Berkshire in the Minor Counties Championship. Also during Summer 1939 he played for the British Army against a West Indies team.

During the Second World War Magill served in the 1st Battalion, the Royal Berkshire Regiment, where he gained the rank of lieutenant. He died in a training accident at Filey in Yorkshire on 5 September 1940, when he stood on a land mine. At the time he was serving as intelligence officer to the 6th Infantry Brigade commander Brigadier Dennis Walter Furlong, who was also killed in the blast.
