= Stephen Plumb =

English cricketer

Personal information
- Full name: Stephen George Plumb
- Born: 17 January 1954 (age 72); Wimbish, Essex, England
- Nickname: Plummy
- Batting: Right-handed
- Bowling: Right-arm off break Right-arm medium

Domestic team information
- Years: Team
- 1997–2002: Lincolnshire
- 1980–1992: Minor Counties
- 1978–1995: Norfolk
- 1975–1977: Essex

Career statistics
Competition	First-class	List A
Matches	5	64
Runs scored	216	1,109
Batting average	30.85	19.80
100s/50s	–/1	–/4
Top score	69	63
Balls bowled	228	2,059
Wickets	3	26
Bowling average	41.33	54.26
5 wickets in innings	–	–
10 wickets in match	–	–
Best bowling	2/47	4/16
Catches/stumpings	2/–	10/–
- Source: Cricinfo, 23 August 2011

Stephen George Plumb (born 17 January 1954) is a former English cricketer. Plumb was a right-handed batsman who bowled both right-arm off break and right-arm medium pace. He was born in Wimbish, Essex.

Plumb made his first-class debut for Essex against Cambridge University in 1975. In that same season he also made his List A debut for the county against Yorkshire in the 1975 John Player League. With opportunities limited at Essex, he would go on to make a further List A appearance against Sussex in the 1976 John Player League, as well as another first-class appearance against Cambridge University in 1977. Leaving Essex at the end of the 1977 season, Plumb proceeded to join Norfolk for the 1978 season, making his debut for the county in the Minor Counties Championship against the Lancashire Second XI. During his time with Norfolk, he made his first List A appearance for the county against Leicestershire in the 1982 NatWest Trophy. He would go on to make another nine List A appearances for the county, the last of which came against Lancashire in the 1995 NatWest Trophy. In his ten List A matches for the county, he scored 153 runs at an average of 15.30, with a high score of 57. With the ball, he took 5 wickets at a bowling average of 71.00, with best figures of 1/36. Plumb played Minor counties cricket for Norfolk from 1978 to 1995, making a total of 146 Minor Counties Championship and 30 MCCA Knockout Trophy appearances.

He left Norfolk at the end of the 1995 season and joined Lincolnshire for the 1996 season, making his debut for the county against Bedfordshire in the Minor Counties Championship. He played Minor counties cricket for Lincolnshire from 1996 to 2002, making 43 Minor Counties Championship and 14 MCCA Knockout Trophy appearances. He played his first List A match for Lincolnshire in the 1997 NatWest Trophy against Derbyshire. He went on to make four further List A appearances for the county, the last of which came against Lancashire in the 2000 NatWest Trophy. In his five List A appearances for the county, he scored 125 runs at an average of 25.00, with a high score of 52. With the ball, he took 4 wickets at an average of 6.50, with a high score of 4/16.

Playing minor counties cricket for the majority of his career allowed him to represent the Minor Counties cricket team. He first appeared in List A cricket for the team while playing for Norfolk, making his debut for the Minor Counties in that format against Glamorgan in the 1980 Benson & Hedges Cup. He would go on to make 46 further List A appearances for the team, the last of which came against Leicestershire in the 1992 Benson & Hedges Cup. In these 47 List A appearances, he scored 827 runs at an average of 20.67, with a high score of 63. This score, which was his highest in limited-overs cricket, came against Somerset in the 1990 Benson & Hedges Cup. Plumb also played first-class cricket for the Minor Counties, making three appearances, one each against the touring Sri Lankans in 1981, the touring Zimbabweans in 1985 and the touring New Zealanders in 1986. In his three first-class matches for the team, he scored 148 runs at an average of 29.60, with a high score of 69. This score, which was his only fifty in first-class cricket, came against the New Zealanders in 1986.
