= James Wheeler (cricketer) =

English cricketer

Personal information
- Full name: James Anthony Wheeler
- Born: 10 April 1913; Lacock, Wiltshire, England
- Died: 30 August 1977 (aged 64); Horwood, Devon, England
- Batting: Right-handed

Domestic team information
- Years: Team
- 1949: Minor Counties
- 1932–1955: Wiltshire

Career statistics
Competition	First-class
Matches	1
Runs scored	75
Batting average	37.50
100s/50s	–/1
Top score	54
Balls bowled	–
Wickets	–
Bowling average	–
5 wickets in innings	–
10 wickets in match	–
Best bowling	–
Catches/stumpings	–/–
- Source: Cricinfo, 30 April 2012

James Anthony Wheeler (10 April 1913 – 30 August 1977) was an English cricketer. Wheeler was a right-handed batsman. He was born at Lacock, Wiltshire.

== Biography ==
He was born on 10 April 1913.

Wheeler made his debut in county cricket for Wiltshire in the 1932 Minor Counties Championship against the Surrey Second XI. From 1932 to the start of World War II in 1939, Wheeler made 22 appearances for the county in the Minor Counties Championship. Following the war, he played Minor counties cricket for Wiltshire from 1947 to 1955, making an additional making 43 further appearances, the last of which came against the Kent Second XI. In 1949, he made his only appearance in first-class cricket for a combined Minor Counties team against Yorkshire at Lord's. Batting first, Yorkshire scored 231 all out in their first-innings, to which the Minor Counties responded with 210 all out in their first-innings, with Wheeler top-scoring with 54, before he was dismissed by Ellis Robinson. Yorkshire then made 250 all out in their second-innings, while in their subsequent chase, the Minor Counties fell short of their target during their second-innings, being dismissed for 135 to lose by 136 runs. Wheeler scored 21 runs in this innings, before he was dismissed by Fred Trueman.

He died at Horwood, Devon, on 30 August 1977.
