= Leslie Baker (cricketer) =

English cricketer

Personal information
- Full name: Leslie George Baker
- Born: 19 May 1904; High Wycombe, Buckinghamshire, England
- Died: 9 August 1976 (aged 72); High Wycombe, Buckinghamshire, England
- Batting: Right-handed

Domestic team information
- Years: Team
- 1939: Minor Counties
- 1924–1947: Buckinghamshire

Career statistics
Competition	First-class
Matches	1
Runs scored	6
Batting average	6.00
100s/50s	–/–
Top score	6
Balls bowled	–
Wickets	–
Bowling average	–
5 wickets in innings	–
10 wickets in match	–
Best bowling	–
Catches/stumpings	1/–
- Source: Cricinfo, 8 May 2011

Leslie George Baker (19 May 1904 – 9 August 1976) was an English cricketer. Baker was a right-handed batsman. He was born in High Wycombe, Buckinghamshire and was educated at Bedford School and London University.

Baker made his debut for Buckinghamshire in the 1924 Minor Counties Championship against the Surrey Second XI. He played Minor counties cricket for Buckinghamshire from 1924 to 1947, which included 113 Minor Counties Championship matches. He made a single first-class appearance for a combined Minor Counties cricket team against the touring West Indians in 1939 at Lord's. In this match he scored 6 runs in the Minor Counties first-innings before being dismissed by Foffie Williams.

He died in his hometown on 9 August 1976.
