= Tom Dobson (cricketer) =

English cricketer

Personal information
- Full name: Thomas Kell Dobson
- Born: 27 January 1901; Whitburn, County Durham, England
- Died: 3 October 1940 (aged 39); Whitburn, County Durham, England
- Batting: Left-handed
- Bowling: Slow left-arm orthodox

Domestic team information
- Years: Team
- 1929–1934: Minor Counties
- 1922–1936: Durham

Career statistics
Competition	First-class
Matches	8
Runs scored	305
Batting average	30.50
100s/50s	1/–
Top score	126
Balls bowled	936
Wickets	6
Bowling average	62.83
5 wickets in innings	–
10 wickets in match	–
Best bowling	4/70
Catches/stumpings	6/–
- Source: Cricinfo, 12 August 2011

Thomas Kell Dobson (12 January 1901 – 3 October 1940) was an English cricketer. Dobson was a left-handed batsman who bowled slow left-arm orthodox. He was born in Whitburn, County Durham.

Dobson made his debut for Durham against the Lancashire Second XI in the 1921 Minor Counties Championship. He played Minor counties cricket for Durham from 1921 to 1936, making 83 Minor Counties Championship appearances. By the time ill health had forced his retirement from cricket, Dobson was considered to be the best all-rounder produced by the county, as well as the most successful player for Durham to that time. He scored 3,040 run at an average of 24.12, as well as 226 wickets at a bowling average of 16.70. No other player at that time had passed 2,000 runs and 200 wickets for the county. He served as Durham captain from 1932 till his retirement.

During his career he also made first-class appearances for the Minor Counties, the first of which came against the touring South Africans in 1929. He made 6 further first-class appearances for the team, the last of which came against Oxford University in 1934. In his 7 first-class matches for the team, he scored 284 runs at an average of 35.50, with a high score of 126. This scored, which was his only first-class century, as well as the only time he passed fifty, came against the touring West Indians in 1933. With the ball, he took 6 wickets for the Minor Counties, which came at an average of 54.50, with best figures of 4/70. He also made a single first-class appearance for HDG Leveson-Gower's XI against the Marylebone Cricket Club Australian Touring Team.

Following his retirement he served on the Durham committee, before succumbing to his ill health in the village of his birth on 3 October 1940.
