= George Hickman =

English cricketer

Personal information
- Full name: George Hickman
- Born: 19 January 1909; Burnopfield, County Durham, England
- Died: 26 August 1978 (aged 69); Stranraer, Wigtownshire, Scotland
- Batting: Right-handed

Domestic team information
- Years: Team
- 1935: Minor Counties
- 1933–1936: Durham
- 1929: Warwickshire

Career statistics
Competition	First-class
Matches	4
Runs scored	26
Batting average	4.33
100s/50s	–/–
Top score	17
Balls bowled	–
Wickets	–
Bowling average	–
5 wickets in innings	–
10 wickets in match	–
Best bowling	–
Catches/stumpings	2/–
- Source: Cricinfo, 30 August 2011

George Hickman (19 January 1909 – 26 August 1978) was an English cricketer. Hickman was a right-handed batsman. He was born in Burnopfield, County Durham.

Hickman made his first-class debut for Warwickshire against Derbyshire in the 1929 County Championship. He made a further first-class appearance in 1929 against Kent. These were his only major appearances for the county. He later joined Durham, who he made his debut for in the 1933 Minor Counties Championship against Northumberland. He played Minor counties cricket for Durham from 1933 to 1936, making 29 appearances. While playing for Durham, he made two first-class appearances for the Minor Counties in 1935, playing against Cambridge University and Oxford University.

He died in Stranraer, Wigtownshire, Scotland on 26 August 1978.
