= Frank Wilkinson (cricketer) =

English cricketer

Frank Wilkinson (23 May 1914 – 26 March 1984) was an English first-class cricketer.

Born in Hull, Yorkshire, England, Wilkinson was a right arm medium fast bowler and right-handed tail end batsman, who played in fourteen matches for Yorkshire County Cricket Club from 1937 to 1939. He took twenty six wickets at 22.69 each, with a best return of 7 for 68 against Hampshire. He averaged 5.61 with the bat in the first-class game, with a highest score of 18 not out. He also appeared for the Yorkshire Second XI from 1935 to 1939.

Wilkinson died in Hull in March 1984, aged 69.
