= George Rogers (cricketer, born 1905) =

English cricketer

Personal information
- Full name: George Howard Rogers
- Born: 4 April 1905; Redruth, Cornwall, England
- Died: 24 February 1958 (aged 52); Camborne, Cornwall, England
- Batting: Right-handed

Domestic team information
- Years: Team
- 1939: Minor Counties
- 1924–1939: Cornwall

Career statistics
Competition	First-class
Matches	1
Runs scored	8
Batting average	4.00
100s/50s	–/–
Top score	8
Balls bowled	–
Wickets	–
Bowling average	–
5 wickets in innings	–
10 wickets in match	–
Best bowling	–
Catches/stumpings	–/–
- Source: Cricinfo, 3 June 2011

George Howard Rogers (4 April 1905 – 24 February 1958) was an English cricketer. Rogers was a right-handed batsman. He was born in Redruth, Cornwall.

Rogers made his debut for Cornwall in the 1924 Minor Counties Championship against Devon. Rogers played Minor counties cricket for Cornwall from 1924 to 1939, making 86 appearances, before his career was abruptly halted by World War II.

He made his only first-class appearance for the Minor Counties cricket team against Oxford University in 1939. In the Minor Counties first-innings, he was dismissed for a duck by Algernon Marsham. In their second-innings, he was dismissed for 8 runs by the same bowler.

He died in Camborne, Cornwall on 24 February 1958.
