= Clifford Smith (cricketer) =

English cricketer

Personal information
- Full name: Clifford John Smith
- Born: 6 October 1902; Shadwell, London, England
- Died: 4 June 1959 (aged 56); Cambridge, Cambridgeshire, England
- Batting: Left-handed
- Bowling: Right-arm medium

Domestic team information
- Years: Team
- 1937: Minor Counties
- 1923–1950: Cambridgeshire

Career statistics
Competition	FC
Matches	1
Runs scored	29
Batting average	14.50
100s/50s	–/–
Top score	21
Balls bowled	132
Wickets	2
Bowling average	19.50
5 wickets in innings	–
10 wickets in match	–
Best bowling	1/18
Catches/stumpings	2/–
- Source: Cricinfo, 20 July 2010

Clifford John Smith (6 October 1902 – 4 June 1959) was an English cricketer. Smith was a left-handed batsman who bowled right-arm medium pace. He was born at Shadwell, London.

Having been on the staff at Middlesex, Smith played most of his cricket for Cambridgeshire in the Minor Counties Championship, where he made his debut for the county against Hertfordshire in 1923. From 1923 to 1950, he represented the county in 109 matches, with his final appearance coming against Berkshire.

Smith also played first-class cricket, where he represented a combined Minor Counties team in a single first-class match against Ireland in 1937. In his only first-class match, he scored 29 runs at a batting average of 14.50, with a high score of 21. With the ball he took 2 wickets at a bowling average of 19.50, with best figures of 1/18. In July 1924 he played for Cambridgeshire against Hertfordshire taking 5 for 53. Stumped by Tommy Crossman, the Hertfordshire wicket keeper, for a number of years he became the club professional for Douglas Crossman at his Cokenach Cricket Club Estate team near Barkway in Hertfordshire.

Smith died at Cambridge, Cambridgeshire on 4 June 1959.
