= USS George W. Rodgers =

Gunboat of the United States Navy

History

United States
- Namesake: George Washington Rodgers
- Acquired: 5 September 1863
- Commissioned: 17 January 1865
- Decommissioned: 16 August 1865
- Captured: by Union Navy forces; 4 July 1861
- Fate: Sold, 8 September 1865

General characteristics
- Displacement: 87 tons
- Length: 76 ft (23 m)
- Beam: 22 ft (6.7 m)
- Depth of hold: 6 ft (1.8 m)
- Propulsion: schooner sail
- Armament: two 20-pounder Dahlgren rifles

USS George W. Rodgers was a schooner captured by the Union Navy during the American Civil War. She was initially intended to be used as part of the stone fleet of sunken obstructions; however, she was retained and used as a picket boat and dispatch vessel and, later, as a survey ship, concentrating her efforts in the waterways of the Confederate South.

== Service history ==
George W. Rodgers, originally blockade runner Shark, was captured by the screw steamer South Carolina off Galveston, Texas, 4 July 1861 and sent to the U.S. East Coast. Arriving New York City 24 August, she was sold to a private purchaser 5 November. Later chartered by the Union Navy under a civilian master, Shark served during 1862 and 1863 as a dispatch ship with the South Atlantic Blockading Squadron until taken over by the Union Navy off Charleston, South Carolina, 5 September 1863 by order of Admiral John A. Dahlgren. Although Shark was purchased to be sunken obstruction at Charleston, she was retained. Renamed George W. Rodgers, she sailed to Port Royal, South Carolina, for arming and repairs, and commissioned there 17 January 1865, Acting Master Loring G. Emerson in command.

During the remainder of the war, George W. Rodgers served as a picket boat along the coast of Georgia in Wassaw Sound and in Ossabaw Sound and on the Vernon and Great Ogeechee Rivers. Occasionally used for special dispatch service, between February and May she joined Coast Survey steamer Bibb on an important coastal survey in the sounds and rivers of the Georgia coast. She resumed picket duty 2 May and operated along the Georgia and Florida coasts until departing Ossabaw Sound for Boston, Massachusetts, 25 July. She arrived Boston Navy Yard 7 August; decommissioned 16 August; and was sold to C. H. Miller by public auction 8 September.
