= Rose Brothers Ground =

Cricket ground in Gainsborough, Lincolnshire

- Interactive map of Rose Brothers Ground

Ground information
- Location: Gainsborough, Lincolnshire
- Country: England
- Coordinates: 53.4100°N 0.7892°W
- Establishment: 1851 (first recorded match)

Team information
Lincolnshire	(1927-1954 & 1960-1961)
Minor Counties	(1931 & 1937)
- As of 18 August 2010; Source: Ground profile

Rose Brothers Ground was a cricket ground in Gainsborough, Lincolnshire. The first recorded match on the ground was in 1851, when Gainsborough played an All England Eleven. The first Minor Counties Championship match played at the ground saw Lincolnshire play Bedfordshire in 1927. From 1927 to 1961, the ground hosted 18 Minor Counties Championship matches, the last of which saw Lincolnshire play Shropshire.

The ground also held two first-class matches, the first of which came in 1931 between a combined Minor Counties team and the touring New Zealanders. The second first-class fixture held at the ground came in 1937 and was between the same sides as the 1931 fixture. The ground closed after the Rose Forgrove company concentrated its production at Leeds in 1987.
