= County Ground, Stoke-on-Trent =

Cricket ground in Staffordshire, England

County Ground
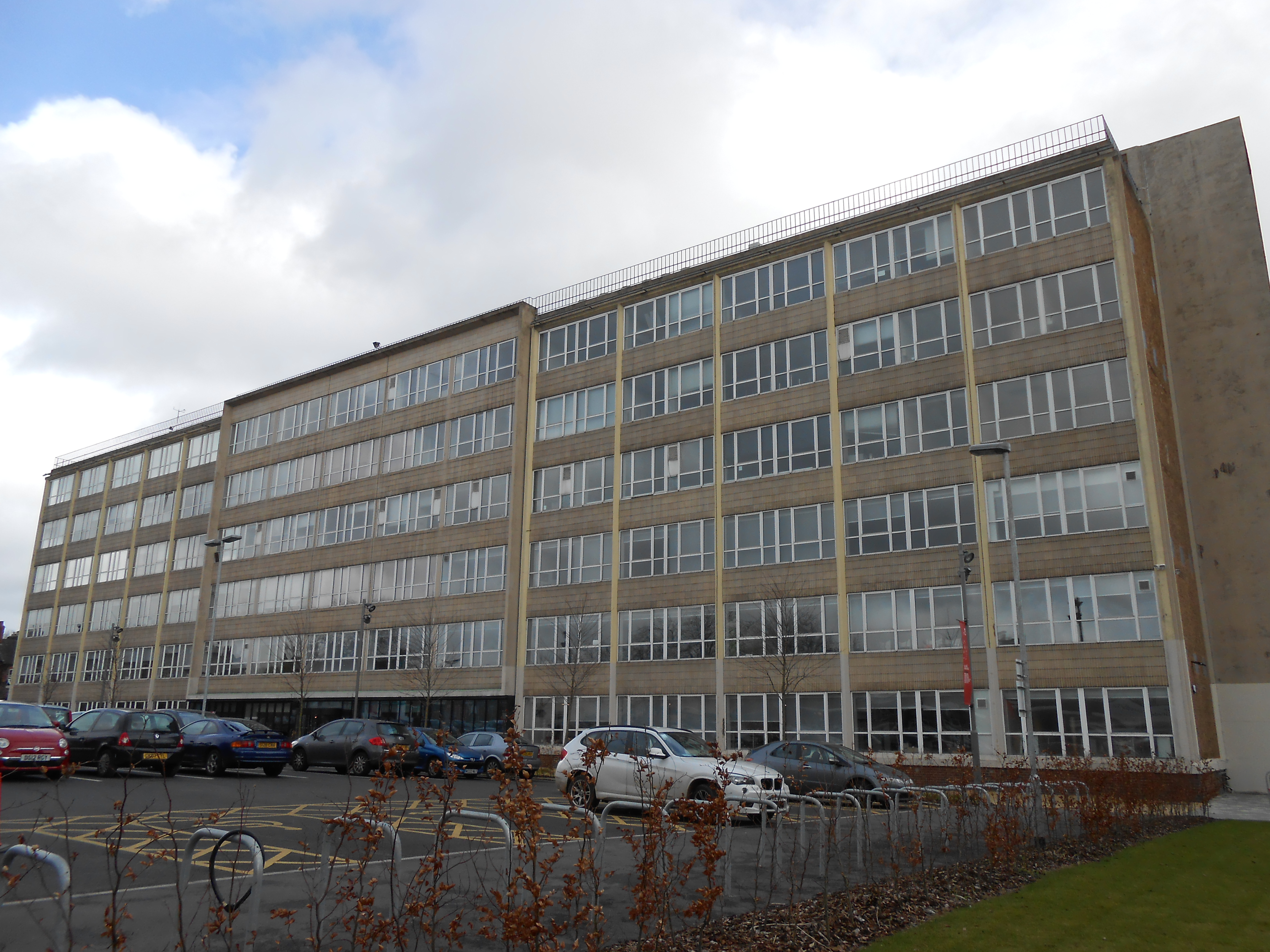
- A modern day view of where the ground was located

Ground information
- Location: Stoke-on-Trent, Staffordshire
- Coordinates: 53.0098°N 2.1800°W
- Establishment: 1885 (first recorded match)

Team information
Staffordshire	(1895–1936)
Minor Counties	(1912–1929)
- As of 15 August 2010; Source: Ground profile

The County Ground was a cricket ground in Stoke-on-Trent, Staffordshire. The ground, located along Station Road, was situated close to Stoke-on-Trent railway station.

== History ==
The first recorded match on the ground was in 1885, when Staffordshire played Derbyshire in a non first-class match. First-class cricket was first played there in 1886, when an England XI played the touring Australians, with the Australian George Giffen taking the first two five wicket hauls to be taken there. Two years later in 1888, the fixture was repeated, resulting in victory for the Australians by the large margin of an innings and 135 runs. The match was of particular note for the England XI being dismissed for 28 in their first-innings, with Charles Turner taking figures in the innings of 9/15, figures which would remain the best return for any bowler in subsequent first-class matches there. The Australians returned to the ground during the 1890 Ashes series, playing a first-class match against a Staffordshire XI, (Note: Although Staffordshire County Cricket Club had been in existence for nineteen years by 1890, it had not been granted first-class status, hence it was a Staffordshire XI and not Staffordshire County Cricket Club which played this match.) resulting in an 88 runs victory for the Australians.

In 1895, Staffordshire played their inaugural Minor Counties Championship match there against Northamptonshire. The ground was the main venue for Staffordshire in these early years in the competition, hosting 70 Minor Counties Championship matches before the start of World War I in 1914. It was in 1912 that the ground played host to a first-class fixture for the first time since 1890, when a combined Minor Counties cricket team played its inaugural first-class match against the touring South Africans, with poor weather forcing the match to end in a draw. Following the war, the ground began to decline as a cricket venue, with Staffordshire preferring other locations around the county. After the war, just seven further Minor Counties Championship matches were held there in a fourteen-year period from 1922 to 1936, with Staffordshire playing their final fixture there against Durham. First-class cricket returned once to the ground in this period, when the Minor Counties played the touring South Africans in 1929, which ended in a draw.

Around the 1920s, Stoke City considered moving from their Victoria Ground to the county ground, however this move did not materialise. By 1955, the North Staffordshire Technical College had taken over ownership of the ground, and shortly after they built on it, with the site today a campus of Staffordshire University.

== Records ==
=== First-class ===
- Highest team total: 248 by Australians v England XI, 1905
- Lowest team total: 28 by England XI v Australians, 1888
- Highest individual innings: 92 by William Cook for Minor Counties v South Africans, 1929
- Best bowling in an innings: 9-15 by Charles Turner for Australians v England XI, 1888
- Best bowling in a match: 13-48 by Charles Turner, as above
