= Alan Parnaby (cricketer) =

English cricketer and British Army officer

Personal information
- Full name: Alan Herring Parnaby
- Born: 2 September 1916; Sunderland, County Durham, England
- Died: 25 November 1974 (aged 58); Westminster, London, England
- Batting: Right-handed

Domestic team information
- Years: Team
- 1949–1953: Combined Services
- 1939: Minor Counties
- 1936–1939: Durham

Career statistics
| Competition | First-class |
|---|---|
| Matches | 8 |
| Runs scored | 433 |
| Batting average | 27.06 |
| 100s/50s | 1/2 |
| Top score | 101 |
| Balls bowled | 6 |
| Wickets | – |
| Bowling average | – |
| 5 wickets in innings | – |
| 10 wickets in match | – |
| Best bowling | – |
| Catches/stumpings | 3/– |
- Source: Cricinfo, 1 January 2012

Brigadier Alan Herring Parnaby OBE (2 September 1916 – 25 November 1974) was an English cricketer and British Army officer. Parnaby was a right-handed batsman. He was born at Sunderland, County Durham and died at Westminster, London.

== Cricket career ==
Parnaby made his debut for Durham in the 1936 Minor Counties Championship against Northumberland. He played Minor counties cricket for Durham from 1936 to 1939, making 26 appearances and captaining the county. He made his debut in first-class cricket for the Minor Counties against Oxford University in 1939. In this match, Parnaby scored 29 runs in the Minor Counties first-innings, before he was dismissed by David Macindoe, while in their second-innings he scored a century, making 101 in the Minor Counties successful chase of 301, though his innings was ended by Michael Farebrother, with the Minor Counties reaching their target with four wickets in hand.

While serving in the military, Parnaby made his first-class debut for the Combined Services against Kent at Garrison Ground 2. He made five further first-class appearances for the team in the 1949 season, before making a final appearance in 1953 against the touring Australians. In his seven first-class matches for the Combined Services, he scored 303 runs at an average of 21.64, with a high score of 87. This score was one of two half centuries he made for the team and came on debut against Kent.

== Military career ==
His military service began as an emergency commission in the British Army during World War II, with the commissioned rank of 2nd Lieutenant on 3 September 1939. He was mentioned in dispatches in the London Gazette on 7 August 1945 in recognition of gallantry and distinguished service in North-West Europe with the Royal Ordnance Corps as a Temporary Major. Following the war, he was still in service as a Temporary Major in the Royal Ordnance Corps, though he still held the permanent rank of 2nd Lieutenant in January 1946. It was in that month that he was appointed an MBE. He obtained the rank of lieutenant on a permanent basis in October 1946, with seniority back to 20 February 1940. In February 1946, Parnaby was promoted to captain. He was later promoted to Major, with his next promotion coming in 1955 when he was promoted to lieutenant colonel. His was formerly loaned to the Government of Pakistan in 1956, the same year in which he was made an OBE. He acquired the rank of colonel on 22 March 1963, while five years later he was promoted to brigadier on 30 June 1968.

He was later appointed as the aide-de-camp to Queen Elizabeth II, replacing the retiring Brigadier Walter Lionel Presson on 5 April 1970. At this time he was serving as deputy director of Ordnance Services at Headquarters, Southern Command. He retired from military service on 2 September 1971 with the rank of Brigadier. His position as Aide-de-camp to the Queen was taken by Brigadier Derek Heyworth Davis.
