= List of Oxfordshire County Cricket Club List A players =

Oxfordshire County Cricket Club, in its current form, was formed in 1921. The county first competed in the Minor Counties Championship in 1895 and 1896. They then appeared again from 1900 to 1906, before competing continuously from 1922. They have appeared in twenty-seven List A matches, making six Gillette Cup, sixteen NatWest Trophy and five Cheltenham & Gloucester Trophy appearances. The players in this list have all played at least one List A match. Oxfordshire cricketers who have not represented the county in List A cricket are excluded from the list.

Players are listed in order of appearance, where players made their debut in the same match, they are ordered by batting order. Players in bold have played first-class cricket.

== Key ==
**General**

- ♠ – Captain
- † – Wicket-keeper
- **First** – Year of debut for Oxfordshire
- **Last** – Year of latest match played for Oxfordshire
- **Mat** – Number of matches played for Oxfordshire
- **Win%** – Winning percentage

**Batting**

- **Inn** – Number of innings batted
- **NO** – Number of innings not out
- **Runs** – Runs scored in career
- **HS** – Highest score
- **100** – Centuries scored
- **50** – Half-centuries scored
- **Avg** – Runs scored per dismissal
- * – Batsman remained not out

**Bowling**

- **Balls** – Balls bowled in career
- **Wkt** – Wickets taken in career
- **BBI** – Best bowling in an innings
- **BBM** – Best bowling in a match
- **Ave** – Average runs per wicket

**Fielding**

- **Ca** – Catches taken
- **St** – Stumpings effected

== List of players ==
No.	Name	Nationality	First	Last	Mat	Runs	HS	Avg	Balls	Wkt	BBI	Ave	Ca	St
No.	Name	Nationality	First	Last	Mat	Batting			Bowling				Fielding	
1	**John Bush**	England	1967	1967	1	14	14	14.00	0	0	–	–	0	0
2	**Brian Edrich**	England	1967	1970	2	34	30	17.00	0	0	–	–	0	0
3	John Love	England	1967	1967	1	7	7	7.00	0	0	–	–	0	0
4	Keith Talboys	England	1967	1967	1	1	1	1.00	0	0	–	–	0	0
5	**Robert Montgomerie** ♠	England	1967	1972	3	96	64	32.00	0	0	–	–	0	0
6	Dennis Banton ♠	England	1967	1972	3	24	13	8.00	180	0	–	–	1	0
7	**Peter Smith** ♠	England	1967	1975	5	81	34*	40.50	233	3	2/40	36.66	1	0
8	**David Laitt**	England	1967	1972	3	36	24	12.00	198	6	3/29	14.33	1	0
9	Michael Smith †	England	1967	1967	1	12	12	12.00	0	0	–	–	0	0
10	Tony Buck	England	1967	1967	1	3	3*	–	24	0	–	–	1	0
11	**Robin Matthews**	England	1965	1965	2	1	1*	–	121	4	2/15	11.00	1	0
12	Mike Nurton ♠	England	1970	1987	11	312	70	31.20	0	0	–	–	1	0
13	Stanley Hahn †	England	1970	1972	2	28	25	14.00	0	0	–	–	0	0
14	Peter Edmondson	England	1970	1970	1	0	0	0.00	0	0	–	–	0	0
15	**Giles Ridley**	England	1970	1972	2	1	1	0.50	30	0	–	–	1	0
16	Terence Strange	England	1970	1970	1	2	2*	–	54	0	–	–	0	0
17	David Parrott	England	1972	1972	1	1	1	1.00	0	0	–	–	1	0
18	Brian Jeffries	England	1972	1975	3	46	46	23.00	128	3	3/31	26.66	1	0
19	Alan Crossley †	England	1972	1987	9	104	38	17.33	0	0	–	–	6	2
20	**Saeed Hatteea**	India	1972	1972	1	6	6*	–	56	8	4/32	8.00	0	0
21	John Potter	England	1975	1975	2	94	75*	94.00	0	0	–	–	0	0
22	Nigel Chapman	England	1975	1975	1	9	9	9.00	0	0	–	–	0	0
23	Nigel Harper	England	1975	1975	2	10	6	5.00	0	0	–	–	0	0
24	Phillip Garner ♠	England	1975	1994	16	168	53	12.92	120	2	1/37	65.00	4	0
25	Robin Goodyer †	England	1975	1975	1	0	0	–	0	0	–	–	1	0
26	**Simon Porter**	England	1975	1987	8	55	44	9.16	486	9	3/58	45.33	2	0
27	Dennis Lock	England	1975	1975	2	0	0	0.00	114	5	3/44	11.40	3	0
28	Roger Busby	England	1975	1987	9	46	22	9.20	576	5	1/15	63.40	4	0
29	Graham Hobbins	England	1975	1986	4	36	15*	12.00	216	3	2/57	49.66	1	0
30	Philip Densham	England	1980	1983	3	17	10	8.50	24	0	–	–	0	0
31	Christopher Clements	England	1980	1987	3	9	5	3.00	0	0	–	–	0	0
32	Martin Thomas	England	1980	1981	2	22	15	11.00	0	0	–	–	0	0
33	Barry Collis	England	1980	1980	1	0	0	0.00	72	1	1/56	56.00	0	0
34	Peter Bradbury	England	1980	1980	1	22	22	22.00	60	1	1/55	55.00	1	0
35	Derek Gallop	England	1980	1984	3	19	19*	19.00	216	6	2/39	34.50	0	0
36	David Beckett	England	1980	1980	1	0	0	–	60	0	–	–	0	0
37	Paul Fowler	England	1981	1987	4	137	119	34.25	0	0	–	–	0	0
38	**Keith Arnold** ♠	England	1981	2003	16	48	20	6.00	1,026	14	2/46	55.42	2	0
39	James Manger	England	1983	1984	2	26	17	13.00	0	0	–	–	0	0
40	**Rupert Evans** ♠	England	1984	1989	10	41	24	8.20	594	9	3/46	43.77	5	0
41	Geoffrey Ford	England	1984	1991	8	187	62	26.71	0	0	–	–	0	0
42	David Wise	England	1985	1993	7	104	68	20.80	0	0	–	–	1	0
43	Clive Ricks	England	1985	1985	1	17	17	17.00	54	0	–	–	0	0
44	**Ian Curtis**	England	1986	1996	10	3	2*	–	458	5	2/53	71.20	2	0
45	David Hale	England	1987	1991	4	41	33	13.66	192	2	2/35	66.50	1	0
46	**Stuart Waterton** †	England	1989	1994	4	158	92	39.50	0	0	–	–	2	1
47	**Timothy Lester**	England	1989	1993	4	57	25	14.25	0	0	–	–	0	0
48	Patrick Jobson	England	1989	1994	6	50	30	10.00	0	0	–	–	2	0
49	Jonathan Hartley	England	1989	1993	6	99	46	19.80	264	6	2/48	33.66	1	0
50	Graham Savin	England	1989	2002	11	223	41	24.77	618	8	3/33	49.87	5	0
51	Darryl Woods	England	1991	1994	3	21	14	10.50	0	0	–	–	0	0
52	Kevin Hughes †	England	1991	1992	3	4	4	4.00	0	0	–	–	4	0
53	Stewart Laudat	England	1991	2002	10	229	58	28.62	400	6	2/15	56.00	3	0
54	Sean Joyner	England	1992	1996	4	11	11	3.66	288	1	1/48	221.00	1	0
55	Mark Cannons	England	1994	1994	1	2	2	2.00	0	0	–	–	0	0
56	Andrew White	England	1994	1994	1	7	7	7.00	12	0	–	–	0	0
57	**Jonathan Batty** †	England	1996	1996	1	1	1	1.00	0	0	–	–	0	0
58	Keith Mustow	England	1996	2001	4	29	13	7.25	0	0	–	–	0	0
59	Robert Williams ♠	England	1996	2003	5	55	22	11.00	0	0	–	–	2	0
60	**Bruce Ellison**	England	1996	1996	1	42	42	42.00	72	3	3/53	17.66	0	0
61	Charles Knightley	England	1996	2003	5	109	61*	27.25	0	0	–	–	4	0
62	Arwyn Jones	England	1996	1996	1	5	5*	–	24	0	–	–	0	0
63	Benjamin Thompson	England	1999	2001	4	129	42	32.25	42	0	–	–	0	0
64	Craig Haupt	England	1999	2001	4	182	126*	60.66	74	1	1/33	56.00	2	0
65	Adam Cook	England	1999	2003	7	131	66	21.83	168	6	3/40	27.66	1	0
66	Ian Hawtin †	England	1999	2003	6	46	20*	15.33	0	0	–	–	7	0
67	Luke List	England	1999	2001	4	20	10	6.66	147	2	1/24	52.00	1	0
68	Paul Jeacock	England	1999	2001	4	13	9*	–	216	3	2/23	41.00	1	0
69	Robert Brooks †	England	2000	2001	2	37	34	18.50	0	0	–	–	1	0
70	Michael Bellhouse	England	2000	2001	2	33	24	16.50	108	0	–	–	0	0
71	Ian Evans	England	2001	2001	3	21	18	7.00	36	1	1/36	36.00	1	0
72	Philip Evans	England	2001	2001	1	1	1*	–	42	1	1/47	47.00	0	0
73	Shahbaz Ali	England	2001	2001	1	7	7	7.00	30	1	1/33	33.00	1	0
74	Timothy Smith	England	2001	2001	2	12	12	12.00	0	0	–	–	0	0
75	Ian Crosby	England	2002	2002	1	10	10	10.00	0	0	–	–	0	0
76	Richard Hawkins	England	2002	2002	1	3	3	3.00	0	0	–	–	0	0
77	Richard Lynch	England	2002	2003	2	60	39	30.00	114	1	1/49	90.00	0	0
78	Mark Rowell	England	2002	2002	1	5	5	5.00	30	2	2/26	13.00	0	0
79	Simon Launder	Wales	2002	2003	2	2	2	1.00	120	4	2/50	25.75	1	0
80	Aneil Nambiar	India	2003	2003	1	0	0	0.00	0	0	–	–	0	0
81	Richard Kaufman	England	2003	2003	1	0	0	0.00	60	2	2/48	24.00	0	0
82	Giles Peddy	England	2003	2003	1	0	0	0.00	60	1	1/39	39.00	0	0

== List A captains ==
No.	Name	First	Last	Mat	Won	Lost	Tied	Win%
1	Dennis Banton	1967	1967	1	1	0	0	100%
2	Robert Montgomerie	1970	1970	1	0	1	0	0%
3	Peter Smith	1972	1975	3	1	2	0	33.33%
4	Mike Nurton	1980	1981	2	0	2	0	0%
5	Phillip Garner	1983	1993	11	0	10	1	0%
6	Rupert Evans	1994	1996	2	0	2	0	0%
7	Robert Williams	1999	2001	3	0	3	0	0%
8	Keith Arnold	2001	2003	4	1	3	0	25%
**Total**		1967	2003	**27**	**3**	**23**	**1**	**11.20%**
