= David Boden =

English cricketer (born 1970)

Personal information
- Full name: David Jonathan Peter Boden
- Born: 26 November 1970 (age 55); Eccleshall, Staffordshire, England
- Batting: Right-handed
- Bowling: Right-arm medium-fast

Domestic team information
- Years: Team
- 1989: Middlesex
- 1992–1993: Essex
- 1995–1996: Gloucestershire
- 1997–2000: Staffordshire
- 2001–2002: Shropshire

Career statistics
Competition	First-class	List A
Matches	8	13
Runs scored	13	43
Batting average	2.60	4.77
100s/50s	–/–	–/–
Top score	5	12
Balls bowled	1,005	630
Wickets	15	16
Bowling average	40.73	6/26
5 wickets in innings	–	1
10 wickets in match	–	–
Best bowling	4/11	30.50
Catches/stumpings	5/–	2/–
- Source: Cricinfo, 7 July 2011

David Jonathan Peter Boden (born 26 November 1970) is a former English cricketer. Boden was a right-handed batsman who bowled right-arm medium-fast. He was born in Eccleshall, Staffordshire.

Boden made his debut in county cricket for Middlesex in a first-class match against Oxford University. In what was his only senior appearance for the county, Boden took 4 wickets in the Oxford first-innings, with Simon Almaer being his maiden first-class wicket. He went wicket-less in the Oxford second-innings. He later joined Essex, who he made his debut for against Cambridge University in 1992. He appeared in 2 further first-class matches for the county, both coming in the 1993 County Championship against Middlesex and Sussex, with Boden taking 3 wickets at an expensive average of 86.00. It was for Essex that he made his List A debut for in the 1993 AXA Equity & Law League against Durham. He made 3 further List A appearances for Essex, all coming in 1993, with his final appearance coming against Middlesex. Again, his bowling came without great success, with Boden taking 4 wickets at an average of 40.50 in limited-overs cricket for Essex. Leaving Essex at the end of the 1994 season, Boden joined Gloucestershire in 1995. His first-class debut for the county came against Hampshire in the County Championship. He made 2 further first-class appearances for Gloucestershire, against Oxford University in 1995 and the touring Indians in 1996. He took 8 wickets in his 3 first-class appearances for the county, which came at an average of 40.87, with best figures of 3/38. He made 4 List A appearances for the county, with 3 coming in the 1995 AXA Equity & Law League and one against Suffolk in the 1995 NatWest Trophy. In these 4 matches, he took 9 wickets at an average of 14.33, with best figures of 6/26, which came against Suffolk.

Leaving Gloucestershire at the end of the 1996 season, Boden joined Staffordshire, with him making his debut for the county in the 1997 Minor Counties Championship against Buckinghamshire. He played Minor counties cricket for Staffordshire from 1997 to 2000, which included 21 Minor Counties Championship matches and 4 MCCA Knockout Trophy matches. He made his first List A appearance for the county against Leicestershire in the 1998 NatWest Trophy, with Boden making 3 further List A appearances for the county. He struggled with the ball in these matches, taking just a single wicket for an overall cost of 172 runs. In 2001, he joined Shropshire, with Boden making his debut for the county against Oxfordshire in the 2001 Minor Counties Championship. He played for Shropshire in 2001 and 2002, making 5 Minor Counties Championship appearances and 7 MCCA Knockout Trophy appearances. His only List A appearance for Shropshire came against Oxfordshire in the 2nd round of the 2002 Cheltenham & Gloucester Trophy, which was played in 2001. In this match, he was dismissed for 8 runs by Adam Cook, while with the ball he took the wickets of Craig Haupt and Timothy Smith, for the cost of 25 runs from 8 overs.
