= List of Oxfordshire County Cricket Club grounds =

Oxfordshire County Cricket Club was established on 14 December 1921; prior to that a county club had existed before, with Oxfordshire competing in the first two Minor Counties Championship's in 1895 and 1896, and an Oxfordshire side also appeared in the competition from 1900 to 1906. It has since played minor counties cricket from 1922 and played List A cricket from 1967 to 2003, using a different number of home grounds during that time. Their first home minor counties fixture in 1895 was against Worcestershire at Christ Church Ground, Oxford, while their first home List A match came 75 years later, also against Worcestershire, in the 1970 Gillette Cup at Morris Motors Sports Ground, Cowley.

The thirty grounds that Oxfordshire have used for home matches since 1895 are listed below, with statistics complete through to the end of the 2014 season.

== Grounds ==
=== List A ===
Below is a complete list of grounds used by Oxfordshire County Cricket Club when it was permitted to play List A matches. These grounds have also held Minor Counties Championship and MCCA Knockout Trophy matches.

Name	Location	First	Last	Matches	First	Last	Matches	First	Last	Matches	Refs
Name	Location	List A			Minor Counties Championship			MCCA Trophy			Refs
Christ Church Ground	Oxford	11 July 1981 v Glamorgan	29 August 2001 v Nottinghamshire Cricket Board	5	24 June 1895 v Worcestershire	23 July 2000 v Devon	73	12 June 1982 v Dorset	10 June 2001 v Surrey Cricket Board	16	(Note: Oxford University played 37 first-class matches here between 1878–1961. A combined Minor Counties cricket team played two List A matches here in the 1987 Benson & Hedges Cup. Only the List A matches played by Oxfordshire at the ground are recorded in the table. Cambridgeshire and Cheshire played the final of the 1987 MCCA Knockout Trophy here. Only the MCCA Knockout Trophy matches played by Oxfordshire at the ground are recorded in the table.)
Morris Motors Sports Ground	Cowley	25 April 1970 v Worcestershire	25 June 1975 v Cornwall	2	30 July 1954 v Buckinghamshire	7 July 1991 v Berkshire	32	–	–	0	
Butt's Way	Kingston Blount	21 June 1984 v Somerset	25 June 1996 v Lancashire	2	19 July 1987 v Buckinghamshire	9 August 1998 v Herefordshire	5	28 June 1998 v Leicestershire Cricket Board	6 May 2007 v Buckinghamshire	4	
Vicarage Hill	East Challow	only match: 1 May 2001 v Huntingdonshire		1	27 June 1993 v Wiltshire	12 June 2011 v Wiltshire	17	7 June 1998 v Nottinghamshire Cricket Board	11 May 2014 v Buckinghamshire	15	
White Post Road	Bodicote	29 August 2002 v Lancashire Cricket Board	31 August 2003 v Herefordshire	2	29 June 1997 v Dorset	22 June 2014 v Devon	17	16 June 2002 v Northamptonshire Cricket Board	13 July 2008 v Berkshire	3	

=== Minor Counties ===
Below is a complete list of grounds used by Oxfordshire County Cricket Club in Minor Counties Championship and MCCA Knockout Trophy matches. (Note: Oxfordshire played 42 Minor Counties Championship matches in Oxford, for which the location upon which the matches were played is not recorded. The venue is given the conjectural name of Oxford.)

Name	Location	First	Last	Matches	First	Last	Matches	Refs
Name	Location	Minor Counties Championship			MCCA Trophy			Refs
Oxford County School Ground	Thame	17 July 1895 v Buckinghamshire	5 August 1898 v Buckinghamshire	4	–	–	0	
Britannia Works Ground	Banbury	2 August 1895 v Bedfordshire	1 August 1898 v Berkshire	4	–	–	0	
Hertford College Ground	Oxford	26 August 1895 v Norfolk	17 August 1904 v Suffolk	13	–	–	0	
New College Ground	Oxford	14 August 1896 v Wiltshire	25 August 1939 v Bedfordshire	13	–	–	0	(Note: Oxford University played two first-class matches here in 1906 and 1907.)
Merton College Ground	Oxford	16 August 1897 v Berkshire	18 August 1937 v Bedfordshire	20	–	–	0	
Burford Road	Shipton-under-Wychwood	26 July 1922 v Berkshire	13 June 1999 v Shropshire	9	–	–	0	
Blenheim	Blenheim	only match: 4 August 1922 v Buckinghamshire		1	–	–	0	(Note: The exact name and location of the ground used in Blenheim is not known.)
St John's College Ground	Oxford	27 July 1923 v Cambridgeshire	30 August 1961 v Berkshire	8	–	–	0	
Trinity College Ground	Oxford	only match: 20 August 1923 v Buckinghamshire		1	–	–	0	
Northern Aluminium Company Ground	Banbury	1 July 1930 v Monmouthshire	10 August 1960 v Devon	13	–	–	0	
Grange Road	Banbury	23 August 1935 v Berkshire	1 August 1993 v Cheshire	4	–	–	0	
Lincoln College Ground	Oxford	21 August 1936 v Berkshire	3 August 1938 v Devon	3	–	–	0	
St Edward's School Ground	Oxford	6 August 1948 v Cornwall	18 July 1993 v Dorset	29	–	–	0	
Smith's Industries Ground	Witney	25 August 1950 v Buckinghamshire	25 August 1967 v Berkshire	12	–	–	0	
Roman Way Sports Ground	Oxford	8 August 1955 v Cornwall	31 July 1968 v Wiltshire	30	–	–	0	
Pressed Steel Fisher Sports Ground	Cowley	10 August 1962 v Wiltshire	3 August 1997 v Cheshire	12	only match: 4 June 1994 v Berkshire		1	
The Brakspear Ground	Remenham	6 August 1964 v Oxfordshire	8 June 2014 v Cornwall	17	27 April 2008 v Herefordshire	22 April 2012 v Wales Minor Counties	6	
Witney Mills Ground	Witney	25 August 1969 v Berkshire	16 August 1979 v Wiltshire	11	–	–	0	
Abingdon War Memorial Field	Abingdon	2 August 1980 v Dorset	10 August 1981 v Devon	2	–	–	0	
Banbury Twenty Cricket Club Ground	Banbury	13 August 1980 v Devon	27 August 1995 v Berkshire	11	–	–	0	
Church Meadow	Thame	30 May 1995 v Shropshire	28 July 2002 v Wiltshire	8	11 June 1995 v Berkshire	19 May 1999 v Huntingdonshire	3	
University Parks	Oxford	only match: 4 July 2000 v Cornwall		1	–	–	0	(Note: Oxford University have played first-class and List A matches.)
Bicester and North Oxford Cricket Club Ground	Chesterton	27 July 2003 v Dorset	17 July 2005 v Berkshire	3	6 May 2012 v Hertfordshire	13 July 2014 v Wiltshire	5	
Radley College	Abingdon	–	–	0	3 June 2007 v Wiltshire	16 May 2010 v Herefordshire	2	
Ledwell Road	Great Tew	7 June 2009 v Dorset	3 August 2014 v Berkshire	7	only match: 11 May 2008 v Cheshire		1	
