= Charlie Walters =

English footballer

Personal information
- Date of birth: 1 April 1897
- Place of birth: Sandford-on-Thames, Oxfordshire, England
- Date of death: 13 May 1971
- Place of death: Kidlington, Oxfordshire, England
- Height: 5 ft 11 in (1.80 m)
- Position: Centre half

Senior career*
Years	Team	Apps	(Gls)
?–1919	Oxford City	?	
1919–1925	Tottenham Hotspur	106	(0)
1926–1927	Fulham	18	(0)
- Mansfield Town
- * Club domestic league appearances and goals

Charlie Walters (born 1 April 1897 – 13 May 1971) was a professional footballer who played for Oxford City, Tottenham Hotspur, Fulham and Mansfield Town. He was also an amateur cricketer. He was born in Sandford-on-Thames, Oxfordshire and died in Kidlington, Oxfordshire.

== Football career ==
Walters joined Tottenham from Oxford City in 1919. He made 117 appearances in all competitions for the club and collected a winners' medal in the 1921 FA Cup Final. Walters joined Fulham in 1926 and featured in a further 18 matches before ending his career at Mansfield Town.

== Cricket career ==
Walters made his debut for Oxfordshire in the 1922 Minor Counties Championship against Cambridgeshire. He played Minor counties cricket for Oxfordshire from 1922 to 1952, which is the joint second longest playing time for the county, level with Keith Arnold and exceeded only by Stewart Lee. He played a total of 129 matches for the county. He played first-class for a combined Minor Counties cricket team on four occasions: in 1930 against Wales and Lancashire, in 1931 against the touring New Zealanders, and in 1934 against Oxford University. In his four first-class matches, he scored 47 runs at a batting average of 11.75, with a high score of 25. With the ball he took 3 wickets at a bowling average of 49.33, with best figures of 2/72.

== Honours ==
Tottenham Hotspur

- FA Cup: 1920–21
