= 1981 NatWest Trophy =

- Administrator: Test and County Cricket Board
- Cricket format: Limited overs cricket (60 overs per innings)
- Tournament format: Knockout
- Champions: Derbyshire (1st title)
- Participants: 23
- Matches: 22
- Most runs: 255 Geoff Cook (Northamptonshire)
- Most wickets: 11 Colin Tunnicliffe (Derbyshire)

The 1981 NatWest Trophy was an English limited overs county cricket tournament which was held between 11 July and 5 September 1981. It was the first NatWest Trophy since being renamed from the Gillette Cup. The tournament was won by Derbyshire who defeated Northamptonshire by means of losing fewer wickets following a tie in the final at Lord's.

== Format ==
The seventeen first-class counties were joined by five Minor Counties: Cheshire, Durham, Hertfordshire, Oxfordshire and Suffolk. The Ireland team also participated. Teams who won in the first round progressed to the second round. The winners in the second round then progressed to the quarter-final stage. Winners from the quarter-finals then progressed to the semi-finals from which the winners then went on to the final at Lord's which was held on 5 September 1981.

=== First round ===
11 July 1981
(scorecard)

Cheshire; 137 all out (42.5 overs)	v	Hampshire; 138/4 (41 overs)
Mudassar Nazar 32; Steve Malone 5/34 (10.5 overs)		Gordon Greenidge 56; Mudassar Nazar 2/26 (10 overs)

Hampshire won by 6 wickets
County Ground, Southampton
Umpires: Sam Cook & Peter Stevens
Player of the match: Gordon Greenidge (Hampshire)

11 July 1981
(scorecard)

Essex; 306/8 (60 overs)	v	Hertfordshire; 115 all out (39.1 overs)
Graham Gooch 101; Michael Dunn 2/43 (12 overs)		Alan Garofall 26; Ray East 2/5 (4.1 overs)

Essex won by 191 runs
Hitchin Town Cricket Club Ground, Hitchin
Umpires: Bob Herman & David Shepherd
Player of the match: Graham Gooch (Essex)

11 July 1981
(scorecard)

Gloucestershire; 246/8 (60 overs)	v	Ireland; 75 all out (45.5 overs)
Andy Stovold 70 (107); Simon Corlett 3/43 (12 overs)		Ivan Anderson 26 (96); David Graveney 5/11 (9.5 overs)

Gloucestershire won by 171 runs
Castle Avenue, Dublin
Umpires: Barrie Meyer & Terry Spencer
Player of the match: Andy Stovold (Gloucestershire)

11 July 1981
(scorecard)

Yorkshire; 222/6 (60 overs)	v	Kent; 223/4 (57.2 overs)
John Hampshire 63; Chris Cowdrey 4/41 (12 overs)		Chris Tavaré 118; Chris Old 2/33 (11 overs)

Kent won by 6 wickets
St Lawrence Ground, Canterbury
Umpires: Ray Julian & Roy Palmer
Player of the match: Chris Tavaré (Kent)

11, 13 July 1981
(scorecard)

Durham; 187 all out (55.4 overs)	v	Lancashire; 190/2 (51.5 overs)
Steve Atkinson 80 (130); Paul Allott 3/22 (10.4 overs)		Andrew Kennedy 102* (150); Peter Kippax 2/35 (12 overs)

Lancashire won by 8 wickets
Old Trafford, Manchester
Umpires: Ron Aspinall & Jack van Geloven
Player of the match: Andrew Kennedy (Lancashire)

- Match was scheduled for one day but extended to two.

11 July 1981
(scorecard)

Oxfordshire; 150 all out (59.2 overs)	v	Glamorgan; 154/2 (44.1 overs)
Mike Nurton 70; Malcolm Nash 5/31 (12 overs)		Rodney Ontong 53*; Derek Gallop 2/39 (12 overs)

Glamorgan won by 8 wickets
Christ Church Ground, Oxford
Umpires: Barrie Leadbeater & Derek Shackleton
Player of the match: Mike Nurton (Oxfordshire)

11 July 1981
(scorecard)

Derbyshire; 270/6 (60 overs)	v	Suffolk; 99 all out (46.3 overs)
David Steele 89; Richard Robinson 3/59 (12 overs)		Stuart Westley 28; Colin Tunnicliffe 2/7 (7 overs)

Derbyshire won by 171 runs
Victory Ground, Bury St Edmunds
Umpires: Peter Eele & Arthur Jepson
Player of the match: David Steele (Derbyshire)

=== Second round ===
22 July 1981
(scorecard)

Hampshire; 176/7 (60 overs)	v	Glamorgan; 146 all out (55.5 overs)
Trevor Jesty 67; Steve Barwick 4/14 (9 overs)		Javed Miandad 64; Keith Stevenson 3/24 (12 overs)

Hampshire won by 30 runs
Sophia Gardens, Cardiff
Umpires: Bill Alley & David Halfyard
Player of the match: Trevor Jesty (Hampshire)

22 July 1981
(scorecard)

Essex; 207 all out (59.2 overs)	v	Gloucestershire; 85 all out (42 overs)
Alan Lilley 40; David Graveney 3/25 (12 overs)		Stephen Windaybank 18; Norbert Phillip 3/12 (9 overs)

Essex won by 122 runs
County Ground, Bristol
Umpires: Dickie Bird & Peter Eele
Player of the match: David East (Essex)

22 July 1981
(scorecard)

Kent; 154 all out (56.3 overs)	v	Nottinghamshire; 156/6 (56.3 overs)
Mark Benson 35; Clive Rice 3/21 (10 overs)		Richard Hadlee 38*; Kevin Jarvis 2/23 (11 overs)

Nottinghamshire won by 4 wickets
St Lawrence Ground, Canterbury
Umpires: Sam Cook & Alan Whitehead
Player of the match: Richard Hadlee (Nottinghamshire)

22 July 1981
(scorecard)

Lancashire; 231/8 (60 overs)	v	Middlesex; 189 all out (48.3 overs)
David Lloyd 81; Wayne Daniel 4/28 (12 overs)		Wilf Slack 53; Neal Radford 3/20 (10.3 overs)

Lancashire won by 42 runs
Old Trafford, Manchester
Umpires: Ron Aspinall & Ray Julian
Player of the match: David Lloyd (Lancashire)

22 July 1981
(scorecard)

Somerset; 202 all out (59.4 overs)	v	Northamptonshire; 204/3 (53.1 overs)
Nigel Popplewell 57; Sarfraz Nawaz 3/29 (12 overs)		Wayne Larkins 59; Joel Garner 1/32 (12 overs)

Northamptonshire won by 7 wickets
County Ground, Northampton
Umpires: Barrie Leadbeater & Jack van Geloven
Player of the match: Geoff Cook (Northamptonshire)

22, 23, 24 July 1981
(scorecard)

Leicestershire; 261 all out (60 overs)	v	Surrey; 12/0 (8 overs)
Brian Davison 137; David Thomas 4/60 (12 overs)		Jack Richards 8*

No result
The Oval, London
Umpires: Roy Palmer & Derek Shackleton

- Match was scheduled for one day but extended to three. Match was replaced with a 10-over match.

24 July 1981
(scorecard)

Leicestershire; 104/5 (10 overs)	v	Surrey; 88/2 (10 overs)
Brian Davison 43; Sylvester Clarke 2/10 (2 overs)		Sylvester Clarke 45*; Les Taylor 1/9 (2 overs)

Leicestershire won by 16 runs
The Oval, London
Umpires: Roy Palmer & Derek Shackleton
Player of the match: Brian Davison (Leicestershire)

- Match was reduced before play started to 10 overs per side.

22 July 1981
(scorecard)

Sussex; 274/8 (60 overs)	v	Warwickshire; 150 all out (47.5 overs)
Ian Greig 82; Bob Willis 2/43 (12 overs)		Asif Din 33; Ian Greig 4/31 (7.5 overs)

Sussex won by 124 runs
Edgbaston, Birmingham
Umpires: David Constant & David Shepherd
Player of the match: Ian Greig (Sussex)

22 July 1981
(scorecard)

Worcestershire; 228 all out (60 overs)	v	Derbyshire; 229/6 (58.2 overs)
Glenn Turner 59; Colin Tunnicliffe 5/50 (12 overs)		Peter Kirsten 84*; Norman Gifford 1/26 (12 overs)

Derbyshire won by 4 wickets
New Road, Worcester
Umpires: Bob Herman & Terry Spencer
Player of the match: Peter Kirsten (Derbyshire)

=== Quarter-finals ===
5 August 1981
(scorecard)

Derbyshire; 164 all out (59 overs)	v	Nottinghamshire; 141 all out (50.4 overs)
John Wright 52; Clive Rice 3/35 (11 overs)		Paul Todd 64; Paul Newman 3/23 (6.4 overs)

Derbyshire won by 23 runs
County Ground, Derby
Umpires: Barrie Meyer & Ken Palmer
Player of the match: Paul Todd (Derbyshire)

5 August 1981
(scorecard)

Hampshire; 167/9 (60 overs)	v	Lancashire; 169/7 (55.4 overs)
Nigel Cowley 38; Michael Holding 3/35 (12 overs)		Clive Lloyd 82*; Steve Malone 3/16 (10 overs)

Lancashire won by 3 wickets
County Ground, Southampton
Umpires: Bill Alley & Peter Wight
Player of the match: Clive Lloyd (Lancashire)

5 August 1981
(scorecard)

Leicestershire; 227 all out (59.4 overs)	v	Northamptonshire; 207/4 (50.5 overs)
Roger Tolchard 70; Jim Griffiths 3/51 (12 overs)		Wayne Larkins 81*; Les Taylor 3/39 (10.5 overs)

Northamptonshire won on faster scoring rate
Grace Road, Leicester
Umpires: Arthur Jepson & Alan Whitehead
Player of the match: Wayne Larkins (Northamptonshire)

- When play was stopped Northamptonshire needed to have scored 193 runs to win.

5 August 1981
(scorecard)

Essex; 195/9 (60 overs)	v	Sussex; 170 all out (56 overs)
Brian Hardie 39; Garth Le Roux 5/35 (12 overs)		Paul Parker 45; John Lever 3/25 (10 overs)

Essex won by 25 runs
County Ground, Hove
Umpires: Lloyd Budd & David Constant
Player of the match: John Lever (Essex)

=== Semi-finals ===
19 August 1981
(scorecard)

Essex; 149 all out (60 overs)	v	Derbyshire; 149/8 (60 overs)
Norbert Phillip 42; Paul Newman 3/26 (12 overs)		Kim Barnett 59; Norbert Phillip 3/42 (12 overs)

Derbyshire won by losing fewer wickets
County Ground, Derby
Umpires: David Evans & Don Oslear
Player of the match: Kim Barnett (Derbyshire)

19 August 1981
(scorecard)

Lancashire; 186/9 (60 overs)	v	Northamptonshire; 187/9 (59.5 overs)
Graeme Fowler 57; Tim Lamb 3/28 (12 overs)		Richard Williams 41; Bernard Reidy 3/22 (10 overs)

Northamptonshire won by 1 wicket
County Ground, Northampton
Umpires: Lloyd Budd & Alan Whitehead
Player of the match: Tim Lamb (Northamptonshire)

=== Final ===
5 September 1981
(scorecard)

Northamptonshire; 235/9 (60 overs)	v	Derbyshire; 235/6 (60 overs)
Geoff Cook 111; Colin Tunnicliffe 2/42 (12 overs)		John Wright 76; Neil Mallender 3/35 (10 overs)

Derbyshire won by losing fewer wickets
Lord's, London
Umpires: David Constant & Ken Palmer
Player of the match: Geoff Cook (Northamptonshire)
