= Christ Church Ground =

Cricket ground in Oxford, England

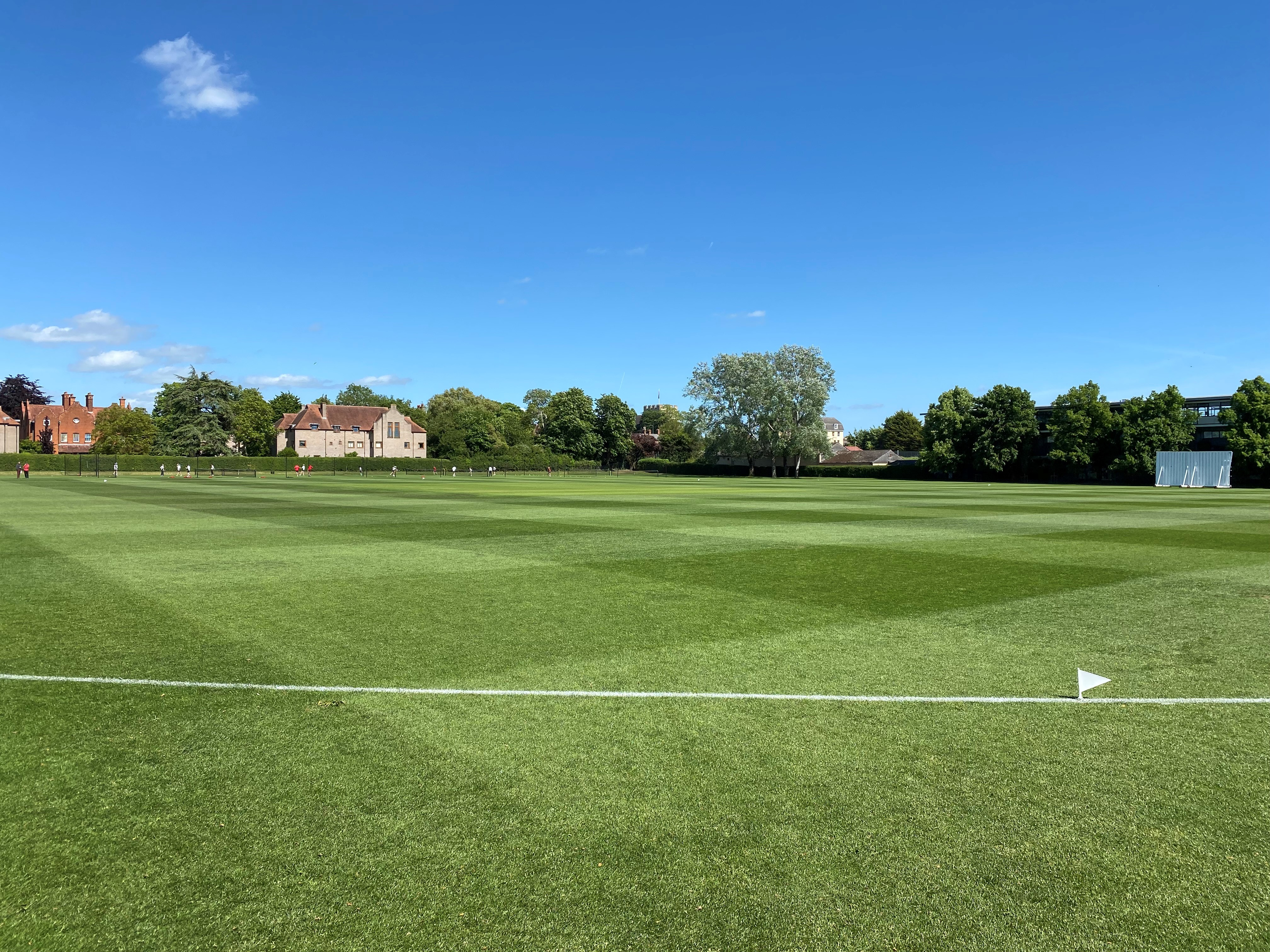
- Interactive map of Christ Church Ground

Ground information
- Location: Oxford, Oxfordshire
- Country: England
- Coordinates: 51.7469°N 1.2443°W
- Establishment: c. 1851
- Owner: Christ Church, Oxford

International information
- Only women's ODI: 21 July 1993: Ireland v Denmark

Team information
Oxford University	(1878–1961)
Oxfordshire	(1895–2001)
Minor Counties	(1987)
- As of 6 September 2020; Source: Ground profile

Christ Church Ground is a cricket ground in Oxford, England. The ground is owned by Christ Church, a constituent college of the University of Oxford. Privately owned, it was the preferred venue in Oxford for matches where a gated admission was to be levied on spectators, typically in matches between Oxford University and a touring international team. The ground was a first-class cricket venue from 1878 to 1961, hosting 37 first-class matches. After 1961, the University Parks became the preferred venue for all first-class matches in Oxford, but it remained in use in minor counties and one-day cricket by Oxfordshire until the start of the 21st century and hosted a Women's One Day International during the 1993 Women's Cricket World Cup.

== History ==
=== Early history ===
John Peel, who studied at Oxford and was captain of the Christ Church Cricket Club, was instrumental in the establishment of the first cricket ground which Christ Church possessed. It was located not far from the Old White House public house and was on the right-hand side of the nearby Cherwell Valley line when heading toward London. By the 1850s, Christ Church had acquired land along the Iffley Road, where they established the present day Christ Church Ground. The newly acquired ground was used by early Oxfordshire sides in the 1850s in matches against an All England Eleven, with the Oxfordshire side typically containing 16 players. Matches in the 1850s were well attended by large crowds. The ground was described as a "splendid" venue by The Sportsman in June 1867. First-class cricket was first played at the Christ Church Ground in June 1878, with Oxford University Cricket Club playing the Gentlemen of England in a match which lasted for two days, with the Gentlemen winning by an innings.

=== Host ground for touring sides ===
Oxford University began playing first-class matches at the University Parks in 1881, having previously used the Magdalen Ground. With the University Parks being open to the public, an admission charge could not be levied for major matches. Therefore, the second match of the 1881 season between Oxford University and the Gentlemen of England was moved to the Christ Church Ground, which being private land meant an admission could be charged. During the match the pitch was deemed dangerous, with play being halted at 3pm on the first day after Oxford's Edward Peake had injured one of the Gentlemen batters with a blow to the head; the match was subsequently moved back to the University Parks and restarted. Where an admission was to levied on spectators, the Christ Church Ground became the preferred venue in Oxford. The Australians were the first touring team to play at the ground, doing so on a cloudy May day in 1882; it was recorded that the attendance was poor for this match.

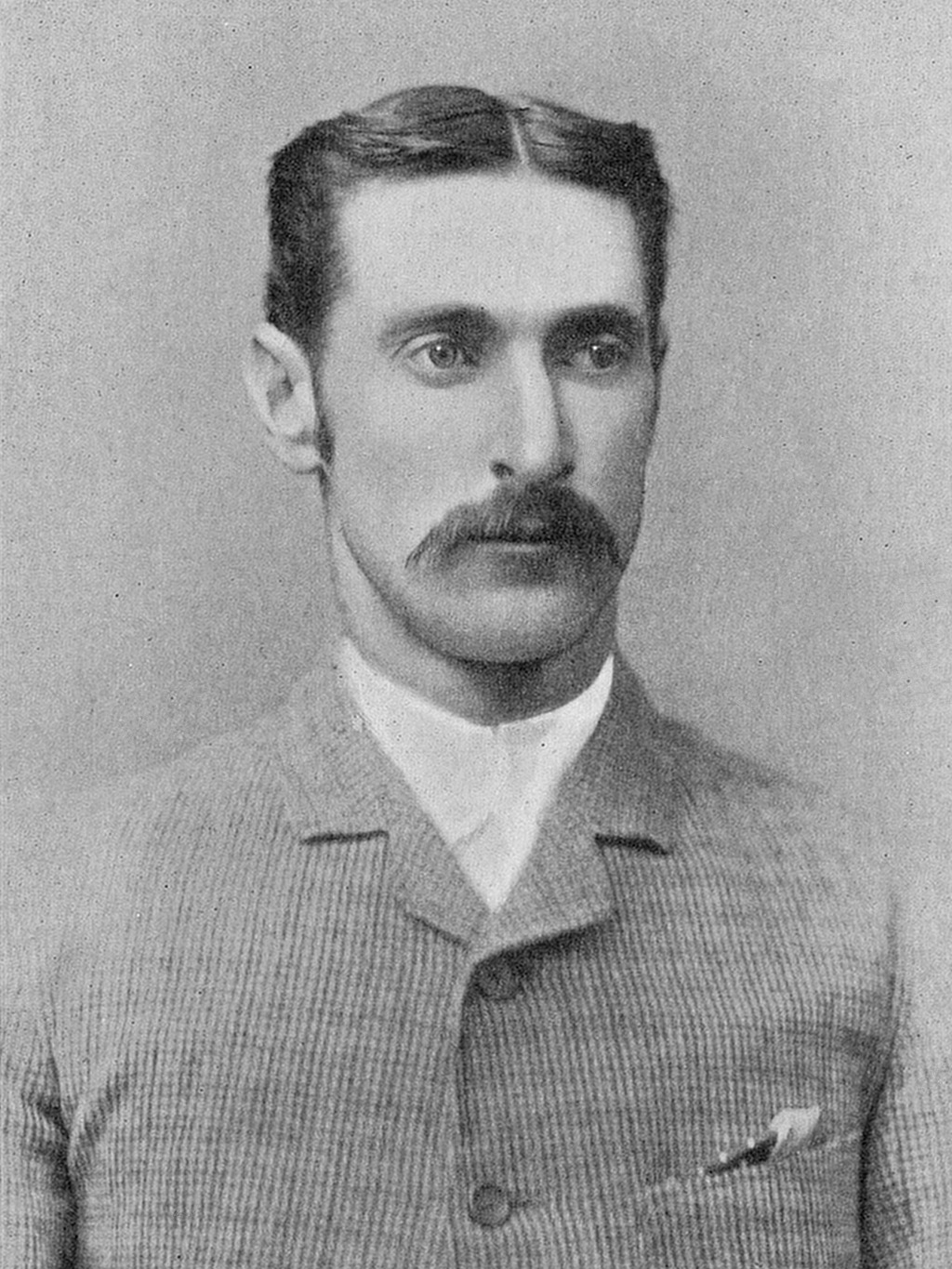
The Australian Fred Spofforth (pictured) took match figures of 15 for 36 at the ground in 1886.

Two years later, Oxford University recorded their first and only victory against the Australians at the Christ Church Ground, thanks in part to contributions from Tim O'Brien (92), Hugh Whitby (8 for 82), and E. W. Bastard (5 for 44). The Australians returned to the ground against Oxford as part of their 1886 tour, in what was a low-scoring match where neither side managed to pass more than 70 runs in an innings; the match was notable for Fred Spofforth's 15 wickets, including 9 for 18 in the Oxford first innings. Surrey were the first county opposition to be hosted at the ground in 1892, when they played Oxford University; in order to secure a gated admission the Christ Church Ground was the preferred venue, with the match being well attended. Later in December 1892, a football match was held there between the county football association's of Oxfordshire and Huntingdonshire, played under rain which rendered the ground "in a very bad state".

Having played minor matches at the Christ Church Ground, such as against Wiltshire in 1891, Oxfordshire played their inaugural match in the Minor Counties Championship there against Worcestershire in 1895. The match was poorly attended, in contrast to the first-class fixtures played there to that point. Up to 1897, the only Australians were the only touring team to have been hosted there. However, in 1897 the touring Gentlemen of Philadelphia played Oxford University there. Between the turn of the century and the First World War, gated first-class matches at the ground continued unabated and included the first visit of the Indian tourists to Oxford, as part of their inaugural tour of England in 1911. Although first-class cricket was suspended during the First World War, the ground remained in use for inter-college matches and additionally saw various armed forces representative sides play there.

First-class cricket returned to the ground in 1921, with a visit from the touring Australians, which was played in front of a large crowd who witnessed Douglas Jardine and R. L. Holdsworth save the match for Oxford. Between 1922 and the Second World War, first-class cricket was played there less often. During that time there were just four first-class fixtures, all against the Australians. The 1930 fixture between the teams was notable for Bill Ponsford's unbeaten 220 in front of a crowd of 5,000, while the 1938 fixture saw the Australians make the highest team total at the ground, with 679 for 7 declared, a record which remains as of 2026.

First-class cricket was again suspended during the Second World War, and it was a decade before first-class cricket returned to the ground. During the war, it did host exhibition matches: the university played a British Empire XI in 1940, and the Australian Services in 1945. First-class cricket returned in 1948, with a visit from the Australians. The 1950s saw first visits by both the touring West Indians in 1950 and the touring South Africans in 1955, in addition to hosting the Australians on two occasions. The ground played host to its final first-class match in 1961, with a final visit from the Australians. The Christ Church Ground played host to a total of 37 first-class matches, 26 of which featured touring sides; 21 of those matches featured the Australians.

The touring Australians and Oxford University were due to play a first-class match at the ground in 1964, however the match was moved to the University Parks because the Oxford cricket authorities considered it more suitable for hosting the match; despite the University Parks being public land, and thus unable to levy an admission charge, this was overcome by the erection of a screened section around the playing area, where a gated admission could be charged. Subsequent visits to Oxford by touring international teams were played at the University Parks.

=== Venue for one-day cricket ===
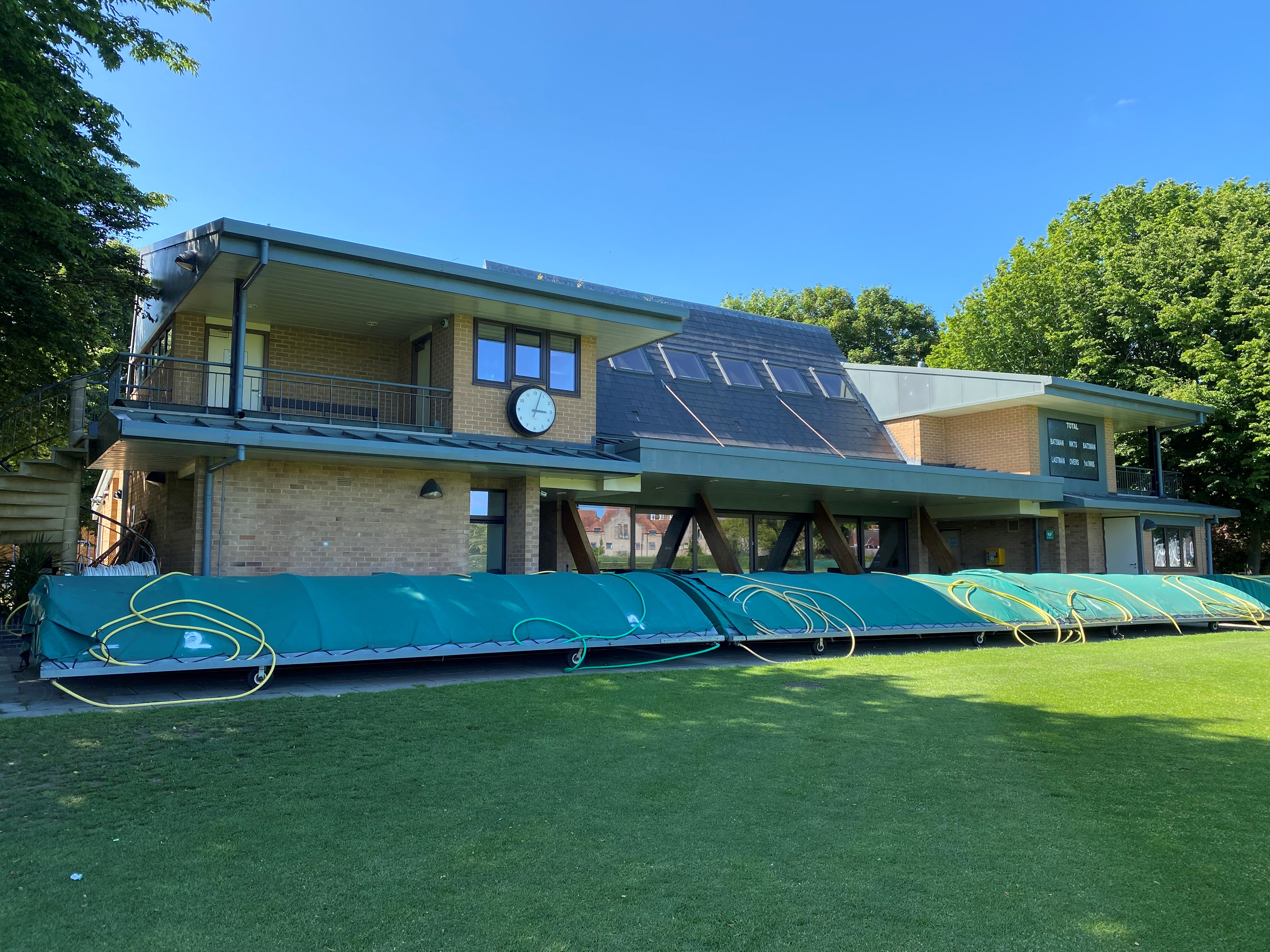
The cricket pavilion (pictured) at the Christ Church Ground.

Beginning in 1963, a county List A one-day competition was established, and from 1964 the minor counties were given the opportunity to partake against the seventeen first-class counties. Oxfordshire had played their previous one-day matches at the Morris Motors Sports Ground in Cowley, but in the 1981 NatWest Trophy they played their first round fixture against Glamorgan at the Christ Church Ground; their first-class opponents won the match by 8 wickets, with Malcolm Nash taking figures of 5 for 31. A combined Minor Counties cricket team used the ground as their home venue for both of their home Group D matches in the 1987 Benson & Hedges Cup. Oxfordshire played three one-day matches there in the 1989, 1990 and 1992 NatWest Trophy's, before a hiatus of nine years where they played their home one-day matches at Kingston Blount in rural Oxfordshire. Oxfordshire returned to play, to date, the last one-day match with List A status to be played at the ground in the 1st round of the 2002 Cheltenham & Gloucester Trophy against the Nottinghamshire Cricket Board, which was played late in the 2001 season; this final match saw the highest one-day score at the ground, an unbeaten 126 by Oxfordshire's Craig Haupt. Oxfordshire used the ground for minor counties fixtures throughout the 20th century, but ceased to use it at the beginning of the 21st century. In total Oxfordshire played 81 Minor Counties Championship and 16 MCCA Knockout Trophy matches there.

The ground was a venue for a group stage match in the 1993 Women's Cricket World Cup between Denmark women and Ireland women, which the Irish won by 70 runs; to date, this remains the only Women's One Day International to be played there.

== Records ==
=== First-class ===
- Highest team total: 679 for 7 declared by Australians v Oxford University, 1938
- Lowest team total: 38 all out by Australians v Oxford University, 1886
- Highest individual innings: 220 not out by Bill Ponsford for Australians v Oxford University, 1930
- Best bowling in an innings: 9/18 by Fred Spofforth for Australians v Oxford University, 1886
- Best bowling in a match: 15/36 by Fred Spofforth, as above

=== List A ===
- Highest team total: 283 for 5 (60 overs) by Lancashire v Oxfordshire, 1992
- Lowest team total: 88 all out (34.1 overs) by Oxfordshire v Lancashire, as above
- Highest individual innings: 126 not out by Craig Haupt for Oxfordshire v Nottinghamshire Cricket Board, 2001
- Best bowling in an innings: 5/31 by Malcolm Nash for Glamorgan v Oxfordshire, 1981

== See also ==
- List of Oxfordshire County Cricket Club grounds
