= Kevin Hughes =

Kevin Hughes may refer to:

- Kevin Hughes (American football) (born 1988), American football player
- Kevin Hughes (Australian footballer) (born 1963), Australian football player
- Kevin Hughes (cricketer) (born 1966), former English cricketer
- Kevin Hughes (Gaelic footballer), All-Ireland-winning Tyrone Gaelic footballer
- Kevin Hughes (Internet pioneer), American World Wide Web pioneer
- Kevin Hughes (pole vaulter) (born 1973), British Olympic athlete
- Kevin Hughes (politician) (1952–2006), British Labour politician
