= Martin Thomas (cricketer) =

English cricketer

Personal information
- Full name: Martin David Thomas
- Born: 8 June 1952 (age 74); Altrincham, Cheshire, England
- Batting: Right-handed
- Bowling: Right-arm off break

Domestic team information
- Years: Team
- 1978–1985: Oxfordshire

Career statistics
Competition	List A
Matches	2
Runs scored	22
Batting average	11.00
100s/50s	–/–
Top score	15
Balls bowled	–
Wickets	–
Bowling average	–
5 wickets in innings	–
10 wickets in match	–
Best bowling	–
Catches/stumpings	–/–
- Source: Cricinfo, 24 May 2011

Martin David Thomas (born 8 June 1952) is a former English cricketer. Thomas was a right-handed batsman who bowled right-arm off break. He was born in Altrincham, Cheshire.

Thomas made his debut for Oxfordshire in the 1978 Minor Counties Championship against Buckinghamshire. Thomas played Minor counties cricket for Oxfordshire from 1978 to 1985, which included 27 Minor Counties Championship matches He made his List A debut against Warwickshire in the 1980 Gillette Cup. In this match he scored 15 runs before being dismissed by Dilip Doshi. He played a further List A match against Glamorgan in the 1981 NatWest Trophy. In his second match, he scored 7 runs before being dismissed by Malcolm Nash.
