= Peter Smith (English cricketer, born 1944) =

English cricketer and school headmaster (1944–2024)

Personal information
- Full name: Peter Bruce Smith
- Born: 18 March 1944; Headington, Oxfordshire, England
- Died: 15 April 2024 (aged 80)
- Batting: Right-handed
- Bowling: Right-arm medium

Domestic team information
- Years: Team
- 1967: Oxford University
- 1963–1977: Oxfordshire

Career statistics
Competition	First-class	List A
Matches	5	5
Runs scored	36	81
Batting average	7.20	40.50
100s/50s	–/–	–/–
Top score	18	34*
Balls bowled	634	233
Wickets	7	3
Bowling average	41.57	36.66
5 wickets in innings	–	–
10 wickets in match	–	–
Best bowling	4/92	2/40
Catches/stumpings	–/–	1/–
- Source: Cricinfo, 24 May 2011

Peter Bruce Smith (18 March 1944 – 15 April 2024) was an English cricketer and school headmaster.

== Biography ==
Smith was born in Headington, a suburb of Oxford, and educated at Magdalen College School, Oxford, and Lincoln College, Oxford.

Smith was a right-handed batsman who bowled right-arm medium pace. He made his first-class cricket debut for Oxford University against Gloucestershire in 1967. He played 4 further first-class matches for the university, the last coming against Glamorgan in the same year. In his 5 first-class matches, he scored 36 runs at a batting average of 7.20, with a high score of 18. With the ball, he took 7 wickets at a bowling average of 41.57, with best figures of 4/92.

Smith made his debut for Oxfordshire before playing for Oxford University, first appearing in the 1963 Minor Counties Championship against Buckinghamshire. Smith played Minor counties cricket for Oxfordshire from 1963 to 1977 which included 106 Minor Counties Championship matches. He was captain of the Oxfordshire side from 1971 to 1977; they won the Minor Counties Championship in 1974. He made his List A debut for Oxfordshire against Cornwall in the 1975 Gillette Cup. He played 7 further List A matches for Oxfordshire, the last of which came against Cambridgeshire in the 1967 Gillette Cup. He made 4 further List A matches for Oxfordshire, the last coming against Gloucestershire in the 1975 Gillette Cup. In his 5 List A matches, he scored 81 runs at an average of 40.50, with a high score of 34*. With the ball, he took 3 wickets at an average of 36.66, with best figures of 2/40.

After graduating from Oxford, Smith taught at Rugby School 1967–85, then was headmaster of Bradfield College 1985–2003. He died on 15 April 2024, at the age of 80.
