= Edward Ellis (cricketer, born 1995) =

English cricketer

Personal information
- Full name: Edward John Ellis
- Born: 9 May 1995 (age 31); Ascot, Berkshire, England
- Batting: Right-handed
- Role: Wicket-keeper
- Relatives: Robert Montgomerie (great-uncle); Richard Montgomerie (uncle)

Domestic team information
- Years: Team
- 2015–2017: Oxford MCCU
- 2017–2018: Dorset

Career statistics
Competition	First-class
Matches	5
Runs scored	54
Batting average	7.71
100s/50s	0/0
Top score	18
Catches/stumpings	11/1
- Source: Cricinfo, 3 October 2018

Edward John Ellis (born 9 May 1995) is an English first-class cricketer.

Born at Ascot in May 1995, Ellis was educated at Kings' School, Winchester, before attending Peter Symonds College. After completing his secondary education, he advanced to Oxford Brookes University. While studying at Oxford, Ellis made his debut in first-class cricket in April 2015 for Oxford MCCU against Worcestershire at Oxford. He played first-class cricket for Oxford MCCU from 2015–2017, making five appearances. He scored a total of 54 runs across his five first-class matches, with a top score of 18. As a wicket-keeper he took 11 catches and made one stumping. He made his debut in minor counties cricket for Dorset in 2017.
