= Anthony Buck =

Anthony Buck is the name of:

- Sir Antony Buck (1928–2003), British politician
- Tony Buck (wrestler) (1936–2021), English wrestler
- Anthony Buck (cricketer) (born 1941), English cricketer
- Tony Buck (footballer) (born 1944), English footballer
- Tony Buck (musician) (born 1962), Australian drummer
