= Arwen (disambiguation) =

Arwen is a character from The Lord of the Rings.

Arwen may also refer to:

== People ==
- Arwen Elys Dayton, American writer of speculative fiction
- Arwen Deuss (born 1975), Dutch geophysicist
- Arwen Mohun, American historian

== Other uses ==
- "Arwen", a track on the 2013 album Crown Electric by Kathryn Williams
- Arwen Colles, an area of hills on Titan, the largest moon of the planet Saturn
- Storm Arwen, a 2021–22 European windstorm
- ARWEN 37 and ARWEN ACE, two models of anti-riot weapon

== See also ==
- Arwyn, the equivalent masculine, Welsh given name, and people so named
