= Robert Montgomerie (cricketer) =

English cricketer

Robert Montogomerie
Personal information
- Full name: Robert David Montgomerie
- Born: 26 September 1937; Watford, Hertfordshire, England
- Died: 17 April 2017 (aged 79)
- Batting: Right-handed
- Bowling: Leg break
- Relatives: Richard Montgomerie (son); Edward Ellis (great-nephew)

Domestic team information
- Years: Team
- 1956: Hertfordshire
- 1963–1972: Oxfordshire

Career statistics
Competition	First-class	List A
Matches	1	3
Runs scored	16	96
Batting average	8.00	32.00
100s/50s	0/0	0/1
Top score	15	64
Catches/stumpings	0/–	0/–
- Source: Cricinfo, 27 May 2011

Robert David Montgomerie (26 September 1937 – 17 April 2017) was an English cricketer. Montgomerie was a right-handed batsman who bowled leg break. He was born in Watford, Hertfordshire.

Montgomerie made his debut for Hertfordshire in the 1956 Minor Counties Championship, making 2 appearances against Buckinghamshire and Cambridgeshire. These were his only appearances for his home county. In 1960, he made his only first-class appearance for the Free Foresters against Oxford University. In this match, he scored a single run in the Free Foresters first-innings, before being dismissed by Dan Piachaud. In their second-innings he scored 15 runs before being dismissed by Tony Jakobson.

Montgomerie later joined Oxfordshire, making his debut for the county in the 1963 Minor Counties Championship against Devon. Montgomerie played Minor counties cricket for Oxfordshire from 1963 to 1973, which included 47 Minor Counties Championship matches. He made his List A debut against Cambridgeshire in the 1967 Gillette Cup. He played 2 further List A matches for Oxfordshire, against Worcestershire in 1970, and Durham in 1972. In his 3 List A matches, he scored 96 runs at a batting average of 32.00, with a high score of 64. His highest score came against Durham.

His son, Richard, played first-class cricket for a number of teams.
