= Densham =

Densham is an English surname. Notable people with the surname include:

- Erin Densham (born 1985), Australian triathlete
- John Densham (1880–1975), British hurdler
- Pen Densham (born 1947), British/Canadian film and TV producer
- Philip Densham (born 1957), English cricketer
- Tim Densham (born 1955), British Formula One engineer
