= New College Ground =

English cricket ground

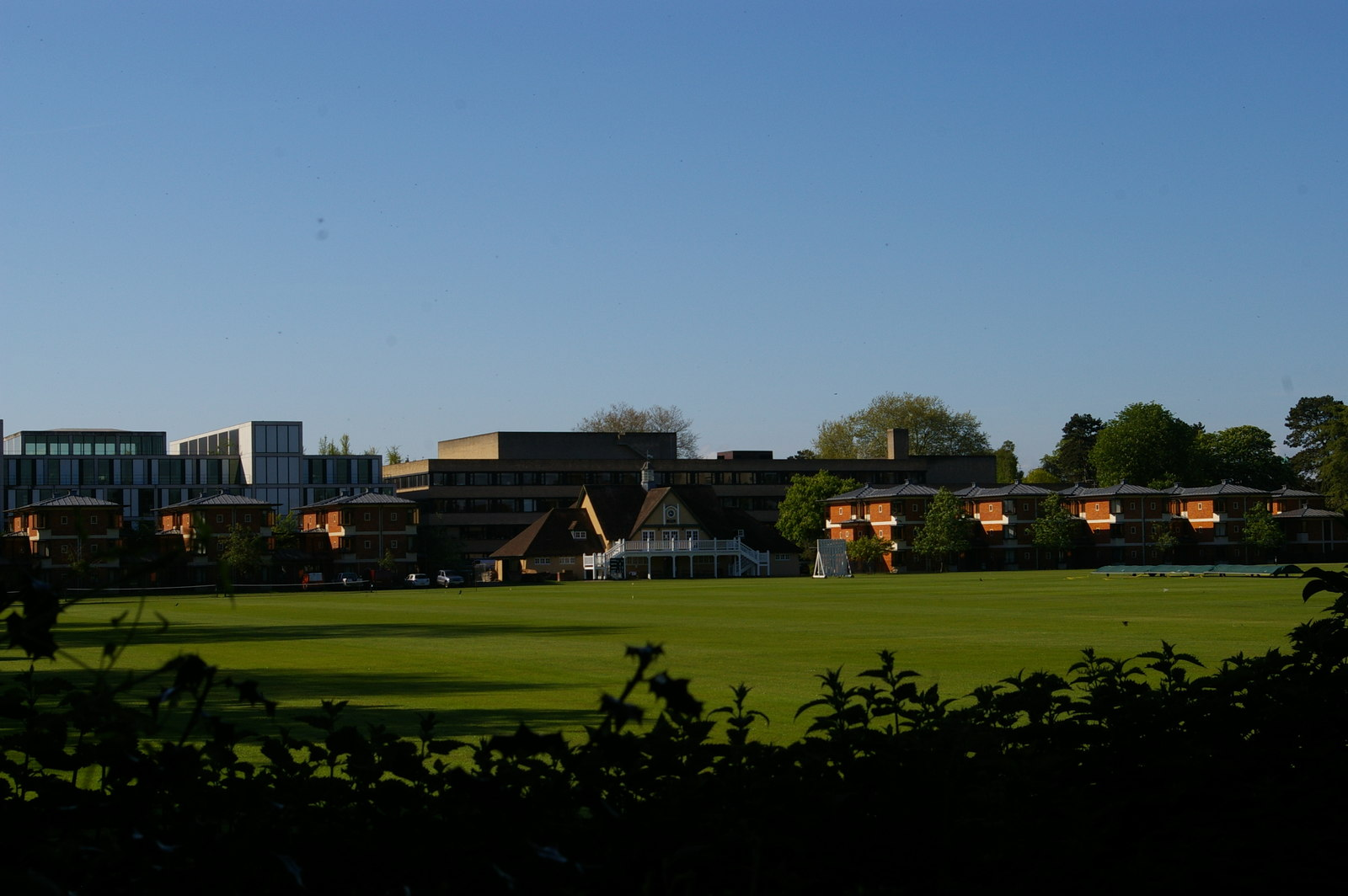

Ground information
- Location: Oxford, Oxfordshire
- Coordinates: 51.7584°N 1.2483°W
- Establishment: Early 1880s
- Owner: New College, Oxford

Team information
| Oxfordshire | (1896–1939) |
| Oxford University | (1906–1927) |
- As of 15 August 2010; Source: Ground profile

New College Ground is a cricket ground in Oxford, England. The ground is owned by New College, a constituent college of the University of Oxford. The ground operated as a first-class cricket venue from 1906 to 1927, hosting three first-class matches.

== History ==
After the Magdalen Ground was established, a trend began where constituent colleges of the University of Oxford began to form enclosed cricket grounds. New College initially leased the land on which they played cricket from Christ Church. In the early 1880s, Alfred Robinson, a fellow of the college, established a cricket ground for New College on land south of the University Parks. Oxfordshire first played minor counties cricket at the ground against Wiltshire in the 1896 Minor Counties Championship. In both the 1900 and 1901 seasons, Oxfordshire played all of their home minor counties fixtures at the ground. Oxford University have played first-class cricket at the ground on three occasions. The first of these came in 1906 against the 1905 County Championship winners Yorkshire, while the second came the following season against the touring South Africans.

The ground was requisitioned by the War Office during the First World War, where it provided initial training for 17–18 years old cadets. To this end, trenches simulating those a soldier might encounter on the Western Front were dug on the ground. The ground regularly hosted parades for the 1st Battalion, Oxfordshire and Buckinghamshire Light Infantry throughout the war. Following the end of the war, soldiers from the 1st Battalion filled in the trenches. The ground hosted its third first-class match in 1927, with Oxford playing the touring New Zealanders. Oxfordshire returned to the ground in 1939, playing all four of their homes matches in that seasons Minor Counties Championship there (a fifth, against Cornwall, was abandoned without a toss). During the Second World War, the ground was not requisitioned and inter-college cricket was played.

== Records ==
=== First-class ===
- Highest team total: 358 for 9 declared by Yorkshire v Oxford University 1906
- Lowest team total: 84 all out by Oxford University v Yorkshire, as above
- Highest individual innings: 169 by George Hirst for Yorkshire v Oxford University, as above
- Best bowling in an innings: 7-35 by Schofield Haigh for Yorkshire v Oxford University, as above
- Best bowling in a match: 10-58 by Schofield Haigh, as above

== See also ==
- List of Oxfordshire County Cricket Club grounds
