= Ioan Evans =

Ioan Evans may refer to:

- Ioan Evans (politician) (1927–1984), Welsh politician
- Ioan Evans (rugby union) (born 2001), Welsh rugby union player

== See also ==
- Ian Evans (disambiguation)
