= Peddy =

Peddy is a surname. Notable people with the surname include:

- Arthur Peddy (1916–2002), American comic book and advertising artist
- George Peddy (1892–1951), American attorney, military officer, and political figure
- Giles Peddy (born 1978), English cricket player
- Shey Peddy (born 1988), American basketball player
