= Stewart Lee (cricketer) =

English cricketer (1885–1960)

Personal information
- Full name: Stewart Charles Burnaby Lee
- Born: 1885; Thame, Oxfordshire, England
- Died: 2 February 1960 (aged 74/75); Brixworth, Northamptonshire, England
- Batting: Unknown
- Bowling: Unknown

Domestic team information
- Years: Team
- 1904–1938: Oxfordshire

Career statistics
Competition	First-class
Matches	3
Runs scored	69
Batting average	17.25
100s/50s	–/–
Top score	40*
Balls bowled	12
Wickets	–
Bowling average	–
5 wickets in innings	–
10 wickets in match	–
Best bowling	–
Catches/stumpings	3/–
- Source: Cricinfo, 20 April 2012

Stewart Charles Burnaby Lee (1885 – 2 February 1960) was an English cricketer. Lee's batting and bowling styles are unknown. He was born at Thame, Oxfordshire.

Lee made his debut for Oxfordshire against Cambridgeshire in the 1904 Minor Counties Championship. He made four further appearances in that season. Later while in the British Raj, where he was a tea planter, Lee made his first-class debut for a Bengal Governor's XI against the Maharaja of Cooch-Behar's XI at Eden Gardens, Calcutta, in November 1917. He made further first-class appearance for the team in a repeat of the fixture in December 1918. In his two first-class appearances for the team, he scored 60 runs at an average of 20.00, with a high score of 40 not out. In January 1919, he made a third and final first-class appearance, this time for MC Bird's XI against the Maharaja of Cooch-Behar's XI, scoring 9 runs.

Later returning to England, he resumed playing for Oxfordshire in 1922, following an eighteen-year gap since his last appearance for the county. This was also Oxfordshire's first season in the Minor Counties Championship since 1906. From 1922 to 1938, he made 81 further appearances for the county in the Minor Counties Championship, the last of which came against Berkshire at the Christ Church Ground, Oxford. His playing span of 34 years from 1904 to 1938 is the longest career span by an Oxfordshire cricketer, some four years ahead of Keith Arnold's thirty years, though Arnold's thirty-year span was unbroken. He had on occasion also captained the county.

He died at Brixworth, Northamptonshire, on 2 February 1960.
