= Richard Montgomerie =

English cricketer (born 1971)

Richard montogomerie
Personal information
- Full name: Richard Robert Montgomerie
- Born: 3 July 1971 (age 55); Rugby, Warwickshire, England
- Nickname: Monty
- Batting: Right-handed
- Bowling: Right-arm off break
- Relatives: Robert Montgomerie (father); Edward Ellis (nephew)

Domestic team information
- Years: Team
- 1991–1994: Oxford University
- 1991–1998: Northamptonshire
- 1999–2007: Sussex

Career statistics
Competition	FC	LA	T20
Matches	251	199	4
Runs scored	14,337	6,513	45
Batting average	35.84	37.43	15.00
100s/50s	29/80	9/44	0/0
Top score	196	132*	20
Balls bowled	282	6	0
Wickets	2	0	–
Bowling average	73.50	–	–
5 wickets in innings	0	–	–
10 wickets in match	0	–	–
Best bowling	1/0	–	–
Catches/stumpings	248/–	52/–	3/–
- Source: Cricinfo, 24 October 2018

Richard Robert Montgomerie (born 3 July 1971) is a former English cricketer who played first-class cricket for Sussex, Northamptonshire and Oxford University. He was born at Rugby, Warwickshire in 1971.

== Cricket career ==
A right-handed opener, Montgomerie made his first-class debut in 1991 for Northamptonshire. He graduated from Oxford University, where he was a Blue, in 1994 and had by then cemented his spot in the side as an opening batsman. After 8 years at Northants, he moved to Sussex for the 1999 season. He became a member of the Sussex County Championship winning side in 2003 and later winning the C&G-Championship double in 2006.

At Sussex he formed an opening partnership with Murray Goodwin and together they are in the record books with an unbeaten partnership of 372 against Nottinghamshire at Trent Bridge in 2001.

In 2007 Sussex won their third championship in five years, Montgomerie scoring 1,000 runs at 40.00 and taking 27 catches. At the end of the season he retired from the game to go into full-time teaching.

One of the most reliable and consistent county openers of his era, in 251 first class matches he scored 14,337 runs at an average of 35.84. He scored 29 first class centuries with a highest score of 196.

In the latter part of his career he often fielded at silly point and short leg, taking many catches for Mushtaq Ahmed.

== Teacher ==
Montgomerie was educated at Rugby School and Worcester College, Oxford. He is currently a chemistry teacher at Eton College where he was a housemaster at Jourdelay's for 1 year, and is currently master in charge of the cricket XI.
