= Arwyn =

Arwyn may refer to:

- Arwyn Davies (born 1967), Welsh actor
- Arwyn Davies, Baron Arwyn (1897–1978), Welsh life peer
- Arwyn Jones (born 1971), English cricketer
- Arwyn Lynn Ungoed-Thomas (1904–1972), Welsh Labour Party politician and British judge
- Arwyn, protagonist of Sojourn

== See also ==
- Arwen (disambiguation)
