= Timothy Smith (cricketer, born 1983) =

English cricketer (born 1983)

Personal information
- Full name: Timothy David Smith
- Born: 21 January 1983 (age 43); Sheffield, Yorkshire, England
- Batting: Right-handed

Domestic team information
- Years: Team
- 2001: Oxfordshire

Career statistics
Competition	List A
Matches	2
Runs scored	12
Batting average	12.00
100s/50s	–/–
Top score	12
Balls bowled	–
Wickets	–
Bowling average	–
5 wickets in innings	–
10 wickets in match	–
Best bowling	–
Catches/stumpings	–/–
- Source: CricketArchive, 2 August 2011

Timothy David Smith (born 21 January 1983) is a former English cricketer. Smith was a right-handed batsman. He was born in Sheffield, Yorkshire.

Smith made a single Minor Counties Championship appearance for Oxfordshire against Herefordshire in 2001. In this match, he was dismissed in Oxfordshire's first-innings for a single run by Paul Humphries, while in their second-innings he scored 41 not out. He also made 2 List A appearances in that season. The first of these came against the Nottinghamshire Cricket Board in the 1st round of the 2002 Cheltenham & Gloucester Trophy, which was played in 2001. In this match, he wasn't required to bat, with Oxfordshire winning by 5 wickets. In the 2nd round against Shropshire, he scored 12 runs before being dismissed by David Boden, with Shropshire winning by 8 runs.
