= Stanley Hahn =

English cricketer and table-tennis player

Personal information
- Full name: Stanley Thomas Hahn
- Born: 9 June 1945; Watford, Hertfordshire, England
- Died: 28 January 1991 (aged 45); Oxford, Oxfordshire, England
- Batting: Right-handed
- Role: Wicket-keeper

Domestic team information
- Years: Team
- 1964–1972: Oxfordshire

Career statistics
Competition	List A
Matches	2
Runs scored	28
Batting average	14.00
100s/50s	–/–
Top score	25
Balls bowled	–
Wickets	–
Bowling average	–
5 wickets in innings	–
10 wickets in match	–
Best bowling	–
Catches/stumpings	–/–
- Source: Cricinfo, 24 May 2011

Stanley Thomas Hahn (9 June 1945 – 28 January 1991) was an English cricketer. Hahn was a right-handed batsman who fielded as a wicket-keeper. He was born in Watford, Hertfordshire.

Hahn made his debut for Oxfordshire in the 1964 Minor Counties Championship against Dorset. Hahn played Minor counties cricket for Oxfordshire from 1964 to 1972 which included 34 Minor Counties Championship matches. He made his List A debut against Worcestershire in the 1970 Gillette Cup. In this match he scored 25 runs before being run out. He played a further List A match against Durham in the 1972 Gillette Cup. In his second match, he scored 3 runs before being dismissed by Stuart Young.

Stan Hahn epresented both Oxfordshire and Buckinghamshire as a table tennis player. He was the leading player in Oxford in 1965, 1967, 1971 to 1974 and again in 1976 and 1977. Hahn also had a great doubles partnership, and won many titles, with David Harse ("Harry").

He died in Oxford, Oxfordshire on 28 January 1991.
