= Ian Crosby =

English cricketer

Ian Crosby (born 18 December 1981) was an English cricketer. He was a right-handed batsman and right-arm bowler who played for Oxfordshire. He was born in Aldershot, Hampshire.

Crosby, who played for Oxfordshire in the Minor Counties Championship and Minor Counties Trophy between 2001 and 2008, made a single List A appearance for the side, during the 2002 season, against Lancashire CB. From the opening order, he scored 10 runs.

As of 2001, Crosby plays for Oxford in the Home Counties Premier League.

Crosby is the current captain of Oxford CC first XI.

On 16 June 2016 it was announced that Crosby was banned for two matches for scathing comments he made to the Oxford Mail. The comments referred to Umpiring decisions.
