= Phillip Garner =

English cricketer

Personal information
- Full name: Phillip John Garner
- Born: 26 March 1946; Liverpool, Lancashire, England
- Died: 2 September 2009 (aged 63); Oxford, Oxfordshire, England
- Batting: Right-handed
- Bowling: Right-arm off break

Domestic team information
- Years: Team
- 1985: Minor Counties
- 1971–1994: Oxfordshire

Career statistics
Competition	List A
Matches	18
Runs scored	190
Batting average	12.66
100s/50s	–/1
Top score	53
Balls bowled	120
Wickets	2
Bowling average	65.00
5 wickets in innings	–
10 wickets in match	–
Best bowling	1/37
Catches/stumpings	4/–
- Source: Cricinfo, 24 May 2011

Phillip John Garner (26 March 1946 – 2 September 2009) was an English cricketer. Garner was a right-handed batsman who bowled right-arm off break. He was born in Liverpool, Lancashire. He was later educated at Jesus College, Oxford, where he gained an honours degree in English Literature. Following this, he settled in Oxfordshire on a permanent basis, playing out a successful 23-year career with Oxfordshire County Cricket Club.

== County career ==
Garner made his debut for Oxfordshire in the 1973 Minor Counties Championship against Wiltshire. Garner played minor counties cricket for Oxfordshire from 1971 to 1994, which included 205 Minor Counties Championship matches and 24 MCCA Knockout Trophy matches. Considered to be Oxfordshire's most successful captain, he led the county to the Minor Counties Championship title in 1982 and 1989. In total, he captained the county for 12 seasons but was associated with it for 23 years. He scored 9,482 runs for Oxfordshire in Minor County cricket at a batting average of 29.54. With his off breaks, he took 64 wickets at a bowling average of 25.11, with best figures of 5/15 against Cornwall in 1979.

It was for Oxfordshire that he made his List A debut against Cornwall in the 1975 Gillette Cup. He played 15 further List A matches for Oxfordshire, the last coming against Somerset in the 1984 NatWest Trophy. In his 16 List A matches for Oxfordshire, he scored 168 runs at an average of 12.92, with a high score of 53. His highest List A score came against Cornwall in the 1975 Gillette Cup. With the ball, he took 2 wickets at an average of 65.00, with best figures of 1/37.

Playing for Oxfordshire allowed him to represent the Minor Counties cricket team. He made his debut for the team in a List A match against Somerset in the 1985 Benson & Hedges Cup, playing a further match for the team in the same competition against Glamorgan.

== Personal life ==
Outside of the county game, Garner played for and captained the England Amateur XI. He played club cricket for Cowley St John and Oxford before joining Shipton-under-Wychwood. It was for Shipton-under-Wychwood that he won the Village Cup at Lord's in 2002 and 2003.

Outside of the game, he worked for Oxford College as head of the Department of Student Services; prior to this, he taught for many years. Garner also served on the Thames Valley Police Authority. A director of amateur theatre, Garner directed a number of successful productions. Living his formative years in the village of Shipton-under-Wychwood, he died in hospital in Oxford on 2 September 2009, following a short battle with a brain tumour. His wife, Mary, set up the Phil Garner – Friends of SDBTT Group following his death. The group currently engages in charity fundraising for brain tumour research.
