= Mark Rowell =

English cricketer

Mark Rowell (born 9 September 1973) is an English former cricketer. He was a right-handed batsman and a right-arm medium-pace bowler who played for Oxfordshire. He was born in Carlisle.

Rowell, who made a single appearance in both the Minor Counties Championship and the Minor Counties Trophy in 2002, made a single List A appearance in the same year, against Lancashire CB. From the lower order, he scored 5 runs.

Rowell bowled 5 overs in the match, taking figures of 2-26.
