= Darryl Woods =

English cricketer

Personal information
- Full name: Darryl Craig Woods
- Born: 5 January 1964 (age 62); Oxford, Oxfordshire, England
- Batting: Left-handed

Domestic team information
- Years: Team
- 1984–2001: Oxfordshire

Career statistics
Competition	List A
Matches	3
Runs scored	21
Batting average	10.50
100s/50s	0/0
Top score	14
Catches/stumpings	0/–
- Source: Cricinfo, 20 May 2011

Darryl Craig Woods (born 5 January 1964) is a former English cricketer. Woods was a left-handed batsman. He was born in Oxford, Oxfordshire.

Woods made his debut for Oxfordshire in the 1984 Minor Counties Championship against Shropshire. Woods next played Minor counties cricket for Oxfordshire in 1990, playing for the county from 1990 to 2001, which included 19 Minor Counties Championship matches and a single MCCA Knockout Trophy match. He made his List A debut against Surrey in the 1991 NatWest Trophy, with the match being abandoned. He played 2 further List A matches, against Surrey in a replay of the abandoned match and against Somerset in the 1994 NatWest Trophy. In his 3 List A matches he scored 21 runs at a batting average of 10.50, with a high score of 14.
