= Philip Densham =

English cricketer

Personal information
- Full name: Philip John Densham
- Born: 7 April 1957 (age 69); Banbury, Oxfordshire, England
- Batting: Left-handed
- Bowling: Right-arm medium

Domestic team information
- Years: Team
- 1978–1988: Oxfordshire

Career statistics
Competition	List A
Matches	3
Runs scored	17
Batting average	8.50
100s/50s	–/–
Top score	10
Balls bowled	24
Wickets	–
Bowling average	–
5 wickets in innings	–
10 wickets in match	–
Best bowling	–
Catches/stumpings	–/–
- Source: Cricinfo, 24 May 2011

Philip John Densham (born 7 April 1957) is a former English cricketer. Densham was a left-handed batsman who bowled right-arm medium. He was born in Banbury, Oxfordshire.

Densham made his debut for Oxfordshire in the 1978 Minor Counties Championship against Berkshire. Densham played Minor counties cricket for Oxfordshire from 1978 to 1988, which included 37 Minor Counties Championship matches and a single MCCA Knockout Trophy match. He made his List A debut against Warwickshire in the 1980 Gillette Cup. He played 2 further List A matches, against Glamorgan in 1981 and Warwickshire in 1983. In his 3 List A matches, he scored 17 runs at a batting average of 8.50, with a high score of 10.
