= Barry Collis =

English cricketer

Barry Collis (born 14 August 1947) was an English cricketer. He was a right-handed batsman and right-arm medium-fast bowler who played for Oxfordshire. He was born in Walmer, Kent.

Collis, who played for Oxfordshire in the Minor Counties Championship between 1978 and 1986, made a single List A appearance for the team, during the 1980 Gillette Cup, against Warwickshire. From the middle order, he scored a duck with the bat, and took figures of 1–56 with the ball.

In 2004, Collis made a single appearance for Oxfordshire in the Over-50s County Championship.
