= Stephen Windaybank =

English cricketer

Personal information
- Full name: Stephen James Windaybank
- Born: 20 October 1956 (age 70); Pinner, Middlesex, England
- Batting: Right-handed
- Bowling: Right-arm medium

Domestic team information
- Years: Team
- 1979–1982: Gloucestershire

Career statistics
Competition	First-class	List A
Matches	15	17
Runs scored	385	181
Batting average	25.66	22.62
100s/50s	0/1	0/1
Top score	53	56*
Catches/stumpings	3/–	0/–
- Source: Cricinfo, 30 July 2011

Stephen James Windaybank (born 20 October 1956) is a former English cricketer. Windaybank was a right-handed batsman. He was born in Pinner, Middlesex.

Windaybank made his first-class debut for Gloucestershire against Cambridge University in 1979. He made 14 further first-class appearances, the last of which came against Oxford University in 1982. A batsman who lacked consistency, Windaybank scored 385 runs in his 15 first-class matches at an average of 25.66 with a high score of 53. This score came on debut against Cambridge University.

He made his List A debut for Gloucestershire in the 1980 Benson & Hedges Cup against Essex. He made 16 further List A appearances, the last of which came against Lancashire in the 1981 John Player League. He also lacked consistency with the bat in this format, scoring 181 runs in his 17 matches at an average of 22.62, with a high score of 56 not out. This score came against Nottinghamshire in the 1981 John Player League. He left Gloucestershire at the end of the 1982 season.
