= Dennis Banton =

English cricketer

Personal information
- Full name: Dennis Banton
- Born: 30 March 1930; Nottingham, Nottinghamshire, England
- Died: 23 June 2010 (aged 80); Kirtlington, Oxfordshire, England
- Batting: Right-handed
- Bowling: Right-arm off break Right-arm medium

Domestic team information
- Years: Team
- 1950–1973: Oxfordshire

Career statistics
Competition	List A
Matches	3
Runs scored	24
Batting average	8.00
100s/50s	–/–
Top score	13
Balls bowled	180
Wickets	–
Bowling average	–
5 wickets in innings	–
10 wickets in match	–
Best bowling	–
Catches/stumpings	–/–
- Source: Cricinfo, 24 May 2011

Dennis Banton (30 March 1930 – 23 June 2010) was an English cricketer. Banton was a right-handed batsman who bowled both right-arm off break and right-arm medium pace. He was born in Nottingham, Nottinghamshire and known by his nickname Joe.

Banton made his debut for Oxfordshire in the 1950 Minor Counties Championship against Devon. Banton played Minor counties cricket for Oxfordshire from 1950 to 1973 which included 177 Minor Counties Championship matches. He scored 5,092 runs at an average of 21.49, while with the ball he took 571 wickets for the county in Minor counties cricket. An able fielder, he took 134 catches. He made his List A debut against Cambridgeshire in the 1967 Gillette Cup. He played 2 further List A matches, the last coming against Durha in the 1972 Gillette Cup. In his 2 List A matches, he scored 24 runs at a batting average of 8.00, with a high score of 13. With the ball, he bowled 30 wicket-less overs. Banton captained Oxfordshire from 1962 to 1967.

Banton's professional career was as a school teacher. He was headteacher at Temple Cowley Secondary School in Oxford, a position he held from the age of 36, until his retirement 21 years later in 1988. Outside of cricket, he was an able golfer, table tennis player and lawn bowls player. Living his final years at Kirtlington, Oxfordshire, he died on 23 June 2010.
