= Clive Ricks =

English cricketer, badminton player, and badminton administrator

Personal information
- Full name: Clive Donald Ricks
- Born: 29 February 1956 (age 70); Brighton, Sussex, England
- Batting: Right-handed
- Bowling: Right-arm medium

Domestic team information
- Years: Team
- 1984–1985: Oxfordshire

Career statistics
Competition	List A
Matches	1
Runs scored	17
Batting average	17.00
100s/50s	–/–
Top score	17
Balls bowled	54
Wickets	0
Bowling average	–
5 wickets in innings	–
10 wickets in match	–
Best bowling	–
Catches/stumpings	–/–
- Source: Cricinfo, 8 June 2022

Clive Donald Ricks (born 29 February 1956) is an English former schoolteacher, cricketer, badminton player and sports administrator.

Ricks was born at Brighton in February 1956. He was educated at Westminster School and later matriculated to Bede College at Durham University. Ricks played cricket at minor counties cricket for Oxfordshire in 1984 and 1985, making seven appearances in the Minor Counties Championship. He also made a single appearance in a List A one-day match against Essex in the 1st round of the 1985 NatWest Trophy at Chelmsford. He scored 17 runs in the match, before being dismissed by Neil Foster, and bowled nine wicketless overs of medium pace. A badminton player at county level for Wiltshire, Ricks was appointed chief executive of Badminton England in May 2005. Amongst his early priorities in the post was a desire to visit all the Counties of England to promote the sport. However, just four months later he resigned. By profession, Ricks was a schoolteacher. He began his career as a physical education teacher at the Matthew Arnold School in Oxford, where he spent 13 years. He later became headteacher at Great Marlow School in Buckinghamshire, a post he held until 2002 before becoming headteacher at King's Academy Prospect in Reading.
