= Richard Hawkins (cricketer) =

English cricketer

Richard William Hawkins (born 1 October 1979) is an English former cricketer. He was a left-handed batsman who played for Oxfordshire. He was born in Banbury.

Hawkins, who played in the Minor Counties Championship between 2001 and 2004, made a single List A appearance for the team, in the C&G Trophy in August 2002, against Lancashire CB. From the upper-middle order, he scored 3 runs.
