= Keith Mustow =

English cricketer (born 1972)

Personal information
- Full name: Keith Robert Mustow
- Born: 26 November 1972 (age 53); Cirencester, Gloucestershire, England
- Batting: Left-handed

Domestic team information
- Years: Team
- 1995–2006: Oxfordshire

Career statistics
Competition	List A
Matches	4
Runs scored	29
Batting average	7.25
100s/50s	–/–
Top score	13
Balls bowled	–
Wickets	–
Bowling average	–
5 wickets in innings	–
10 wickets in match	–
Best bowling	–
Catches/stumpings	–/–
- Source: Cricinfo, 20 May 2011

Keith Robert Mustow (born 26 November 1972) is a former English cricketer. Mustow was a left-handed batsman. He was born in Cirencester, Gloucestershire.

Mustow made his debut for Oxfordshire in the 1995 Minor Counties Championship against Devon. Mustow played Minor counties cricket for Oxfordshire from 1995 to 2006, which included 43 Minor Counties Championship matches and 19 MCCA Knockout Trophy matches. He made his List A debut against Lancashire in the 1996 NatWest Trophy. He played 3 further List A matches, the last coming against Shropshire in the 2nd round of the 2002 Cheltenham & Gloucester Trophy which was held in 2001. In his 4 List A matches he scored 29 runs at a batting average of 7.25, with a high score of 13.

He has previously played for the Gloucestershire Second XI.
