= Michael Smith (Oxfordshire cricketer) =

English cricketer

Michael Wenbon Smith (1928–2018) was an English cricketer.

Michael Smith was a right-handed batsman and wicket-keeper who played for Oxfordshire.

Having represented Oxfordshire in the Minor Counties Championship since 1959, Smith made a single List A appearance for the side, during the 1967 season, against Cambridgeshire. From the lower order, he scored 12 runs.
