= Alan Crossley =

English cricketer

Personal information
- Full name: Alan Crossley
- Born: 14 May 1941 (age 85); Oldham, Lancashire, England
- Batting: Right-handed
- Role: Wicket-keeper

Domestic team information
- Years: Team
- 1969–1989: Oxfordshire

Career statistics
Competition	List A
Matches	9
Runs scored	104
Batting average	17.33
100s/50s	–/–
Top score	38
Balls bowled	–
Wickets	–
Bowling average	–
5 wickets in innings	–
10 wickets in match	–
Best bowling	–
Catches/stumpings	6/2
- Source: Cricinfo, 24 May 2011

Alan Crossley (born 14 May 1941) is a former English cricketer. Crossley was a right-handed batsman who fielded as a wicket-keeper. He was born in Oldham, Lancashire.

Crossley made his debut for Oxfordshire in the 1969 Minor Counties Championship against Buckinghamshire. Crossley played Minor counties cricket for Oxfordshire from 1969 to 1989 which included 153 Minor Counties Championship matches and 9 MCCA Knockout Trophy matches. He made his List A debut against Durham in the 1972 Gillette Cup. He made 8 further List A appearances, the last coming against Leicestershire in the 1987 NatWest Trophy. In his 9 List A matches, he scored 104 runs at a batting average of 17.33, with a high score of 38. Behind the stumps he took 6 catches and made 2 stumpings.
