= Derek Gallop =

English cricketer

Personal information
- Full name: Derek Anthony Gallop
- Born: 26 June 1951 (age 75); Bristol, England
- Batting: Right-handed
- Bowling: Left-arm fast-medium

Domestic team information
- Years: Team
- 1976–1984: Oxfordshire

Career statistics
Competition	List A
Matches	3
Runs scored	19
Batting average	19.00
100s/50s	–/–
Top score	19*
Balls bowled	216
Wickets	6
Bowling average	34.50
5 wickets in innings	–
10 wickets in match	–
Best bowling	2/39
Catches/stumpings	–/–
- Source: Cricinfo, 24 May 2011

Derek Anthony Gallop (born 26 June 1951) is a former English cricketer. Gallop was a right-handed batsman who bowled left-arm fast-medium. He was born in Bristol.

Gallop made his debut for Oxfordshire in the 1976 Minor Counties Championship against Berkshire. Gallop played Minor counties cricket for Oxfordshire from 1976 to 1984, which included 36 Minor Counties Championship matches and 2 MCCA Knockout Trophy matches. He made his List A debut against Warwickshire in the 1980 Gillette Cup. He played 2 further List A matches, against Glamorgan in 1981 and Warwickshire in 1984. In his 3 List A matches, he took 6 wickets at a bowling average of 34.50, with best figures of 2/39.
