= Robert Williams (English cricketer) =

English cricketer (born 1970)

Personal information
- Full name: Robert James Williams
- Born: 12 December 1970 (age 55); Cambridge, Cambridgeshire, England
- Batting: Right-handed
- Bowling: Right-arm off break
- Role: Occasional wicket-keeper

Domestic team information
- Years: Team
- 1995–2010: Oxfordshire

Career statistics
Competition	List A
Matches	5
Runs scored	55
Batting average	11.00
100s/50s	–/–
Top score	22
Balls bowled	–
Wickets	–
Bowling average	–
5 wickets in innings	–
10 wickets in match	–
Best bowling	–
Catches/stumpings	2/–
- Source: Cricinfo, 20 May 2011

Robert James Williams (born 12 December 1970) is a former English cricketer. Williams was a right-handed batsman who bowled off break and who occasionally fielded as a wicket-keeper. He was born in Cambridge, Cambridgeshire.

Williams made his debut for Oxfordshire in the 1995 MCCA Knockout Trophy against Berkshire. Williams played Minor counties cricket for Oxfordshire from 1995 to 2011, which included 79 Minor Counties Championship matches and 33 MCCA Knockout Trophy matches. He made his List A debut against Lancashire in the 1996 NatWest Trophy. He played 4 further List A matches, the last coming against Herefordshire in the 1st round of the 2004 Cheltenham & Gloucester Trophy which was held in 2003. In his 5 List A matches he scored 55 runs at a batting average of 11.00, with a high score of 22.

He has previously played for the Northamptonshire Second XI and the Gloucestershire Second XI.
