= Vicarage Hill =

Cricket ground located in East Challow, England

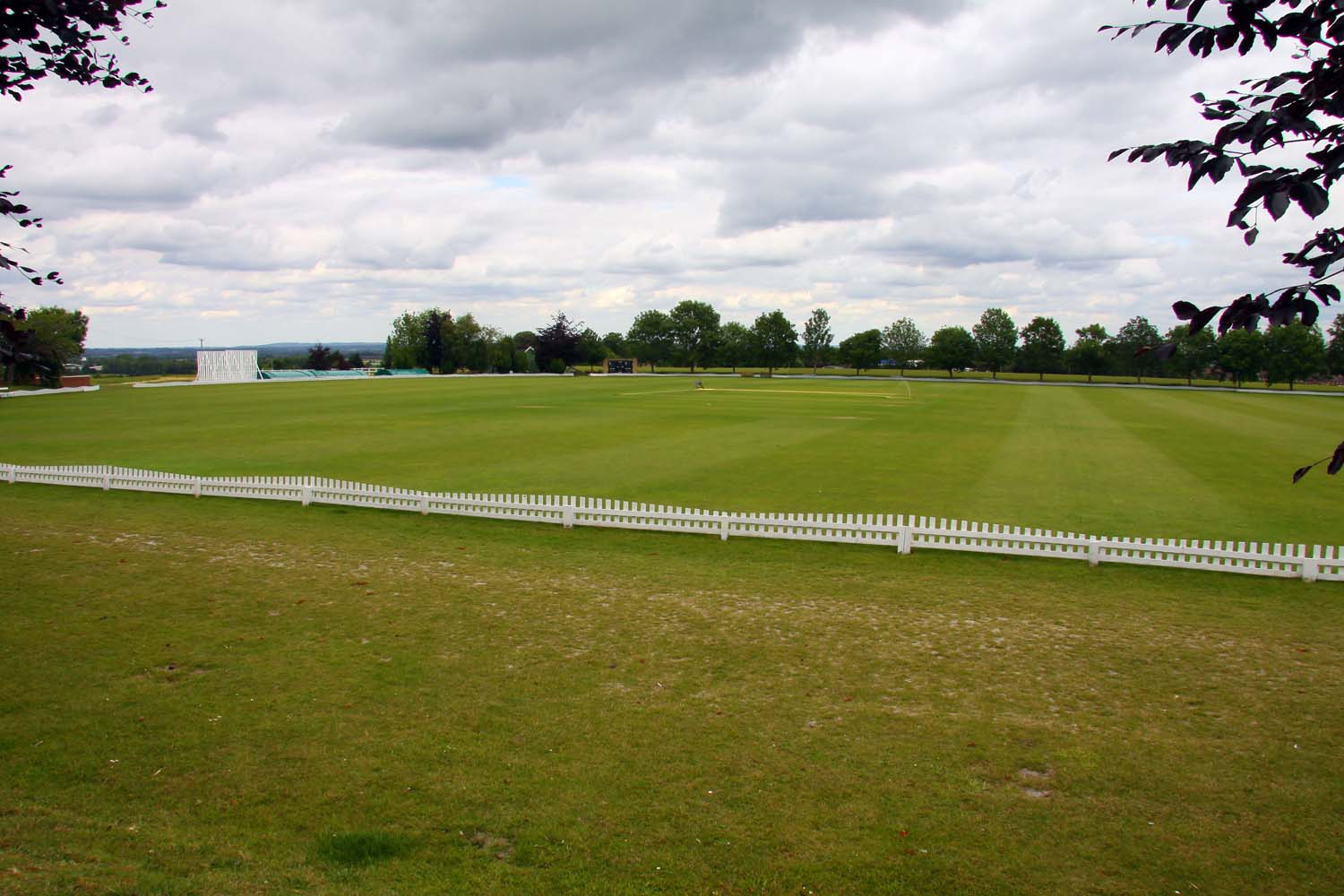

Ground information
- Location: East Challow, Oxfordshire
- Coordinates: 51.5868°N 1.4496°W
- Establishment: c. 1983

Team information
Oxfordshire	(1993–present)
- As of 27 January 2013; Source: Ground profile

Vicarage Hill is a cricket ground located in East Challow, Oxfordshire. Situated on the site of a park which has been in existence since the 1890s, the ground is surrounded to the west by the road from which it gets its name, to the south by the Ickleton Road and to the north and east by farmland.

Oxfordshire first used the ground in the 1993 Minor Counties Championship against Wiltshire, playing a single Minor Counties Championship match in their season, with the exception of 1997, when two matches were played there. No Minor Counties Championship match was played there in 1998, but the ground did hold its first MCCA Knockout Trophy matches in that season when Oxfordshire played the Nottinghamshire Cricket Board, Norfolk and Shropshire. The ground held a single Minor Counties Championship match in 1999, before hosting the Kent Cricket Board in an MCCA Knockout Trophy match the following season. The only List A match to be played there was played in the 2001 Cheltenham & Gloucester Trophy between Oxfordshire and Huntingdonshire. Huntingdonshire made 252/5 from their 50 overs, with Wayne Larkins top-scoring with 73. Oxfordshire were dismissed for 175 in their chase to lose the match by 77 runs. Since 2001, the ground has played host to one Minor Counties Championship match each season, as well as several MCCA Knockout Trophy matches since 2000. The ground is home to Challow & Childrey Cricket Club.

== See also ==
- List of Oxfordshire County Cricket Club grounds
