= Richard Lynch (cricketer) =

English cricketer

Personal information
- Full name: Richard Lynch
- Born: 26 March 1967 (age 59); Banbury, Oxfordshire, England
- Batting: Right-handed
- Bowling: Right-arm medium-fast

Domestic team information
- Years: Team
- 2002–2005: Oxfordshire

Career statistics
Competition	List A
Matches	2
Runs scored	60
Batting average	30.00
100s/50s	–/–
Top score	39
Balls bowled	114
Wickets	1
Bowling average	90.00
5 wickets in innings	–
10 wickets in match	–
Best bowling	1/49
Catches/stumpings	–/–
- Source: Cricinfo, 19 May 2011

Richard Lynch (born 2 March 1967) is a former English cricketer. Lynch was a right-handed batsman who bowled right-arm medium-fast. He was born in Banbury, Oxfordshire.

Lynch made his debut for Oxfordshire in the 2002 MCCA Knockout Trophy against Berkshire. Lynch played Minor counties cricket for Oxfordshire from 2002 to 2005, which included 10 Minor Counties Championship matches and 5 MCCA Knockout Trophy matches. He made his List A debut against the Lancashire Cricket Board in the 1st round of the 2003 Cheltenham & Gloucester Trophy. He played his second and final List A match against Herefordshire in the 1st round of the 2004 Cheltenham & Gloucester Trophy which was held in 2003. In his 2 List A matches he scored 60 runs at a batting average of 30.00, with a high score of 39. With the ball he took a single wicket at a bowling average of 90.00, with best figures of 1/49.
