= Ian Evans =

Ian Evans may refer to:

- Ian Evans (historian) (born 1940), Australian author, publisher and historian
- Ian Evans (footballer) (born 1952), Welsh former footballer
- Ian Evans (cricketer) (born 1982), English cricketer
- Ian Evans (rugby union) (born 1984), Welsh rugby union player

== See also ==
- Iain Evans (born 1960), politician
- Iain Evans (field hockey) (born 1981), South African field hockey player
