= James Manger =

English cricketer

Personal information
- Full name: James G. Manger
- Born: 10 January 1958 (age 68); Headington, Oxfordshire, England
- Batting: Right-handed
- Bowling: Right-arm medium

Domestic team information
- Years: Team
- 1977–1984: Oxfordshire

Career statistics
Competition	List A
Matches	2
Runs scored	26
Batting average	13.00
100s/50s	–/–
Top score	17
Balls bowled	–
Wickets	–
Bowling average	–
5 wickets in innings	–
10 wickets in match	–
Best bowling	–
Catches/stumpings	–/–
- Source: Cricinfo, 23 May 2011

James G. Manger (born 10 January 1958) is a former English cricketer. Manger was a right-handed batsman who bowled right-arm medium pace. He was born in Headington, Oxfordshire.

Manger made his debut for Oxfordshire in the 1977 Minor Counties Championship against Wiltshire. Manger played Minor counties cricket for Oxfordshire from 1977 to 1984, which included 24 Minor Counties Championship matches and 4 MCCA Knockout Trophy matches. He made his List A debut against Warwickshire in the 1984 NatWest Trophy. He played a further List A match the following season against the same opposition in the 1985 NatWest Trophy. In his 2 List A matches he scored 26 runs at a batting average of 13.00, with a high score of 17.
