= Nigel Harper =

English cricketer

Personal information
- Full name: Nigel W. Harper
- Born: 17 January 1948 (age 78); Wigginton, Oxfordshire, England
- Batting: Right-handed

Domestic team information
- Years: Team
- 1970–1978: Oxfordshire

Career statistics
Competition	List A
Matches	2
Runs scored	10
Batting average	5.00
100s/50s	–/–
Top score	6
Balls bowled	–
Wickets	–
Bowling average	–
5 wickets in innings	–
10 wickets in match	–
Best bowling	–
Catches/stumpings	–/–
- Source: Cricinfo, 24 May 2011

Nigel W. Harper (born 17 January 1948) is a former English cricketer. Harper was a right-handed batsman. He was born in Wigginton, Oxfordshire.

Harper made his debut for Oxfordshire in the 1970 Minor Counties Championship against Berkshire. Harper played Minor counties cricket for Oxfordshire from 1970 to 1978 which included 48 Minor Counties Championship matches. He made his List A debut against Cornwall in the 1975 Gillette Cup. In this match he scored 6 runs before being dismissed by David Toseland. He played a further List A match against Gloucestershire in the 2nd round of the same competition. In his second match, he scored 4 runs before being dismissed by David Graveney.
