= Butt's Way =

Cricket ground in Aston Rowant, Oxfordshire

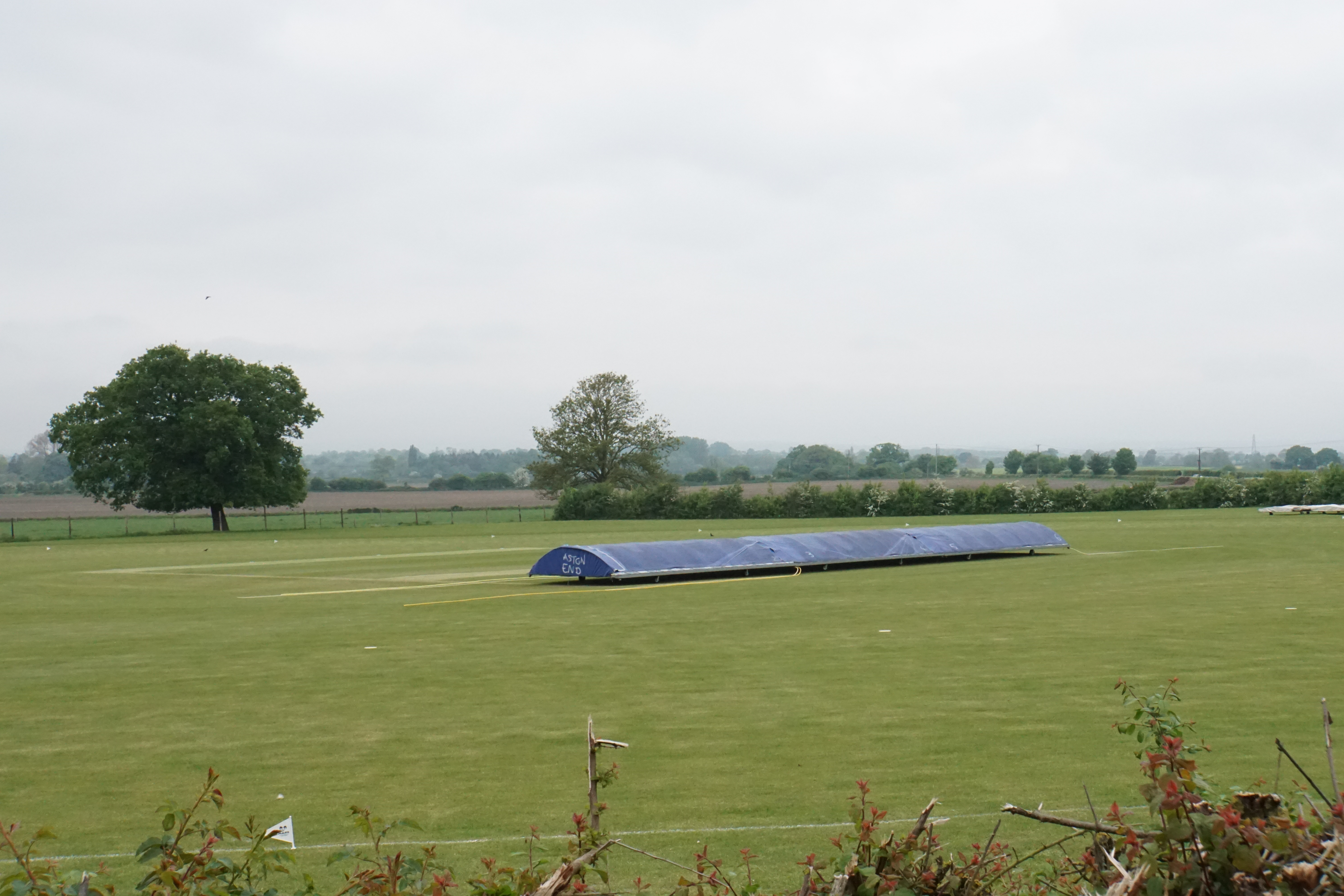

Ground information
- Location: Aston Rowant, Oxfordshire
- Coordinates: 51.6876°N 0.9378°W
- Establishment: 1880

International information
- Only WODI: 7 July 2011: India v New Zealand

Team information
Oxfordshire	(1987–2022)
- As of 2 June 2022; Source: Ground profile

Butt's Way is a cricket ground between the villages of Aston Rowant and Kingston Blount in Oxfordshire.

== History ==
The cricket ground was established in 1880 on land on Aston Moors lent by a T. Taylor. Having been used in club cricket by Aston Rowant Cricket Club for over a century, the ground hosted its first minor counties fixture for Oxfordshire in the 1987 Minor Counties Championship against Buckinghamshire. Oxfordshire later played two List A one-day matches there against first-class opponents Somerset in the 1994 NatWest Trophy and Lancashire in the 1996 NatWest Trophy. Oxfordshire played minor counties cricket there until 1999, after which followed a hiatus of seven years before they returned. Up until 2025, Oxfordshire have played seven Minor Counties Championship and six NCCA Knockout Trophy matches at the ground. In 2011, the ground played host to a Women's One Day International between India women and New Zealand women.

== Records ==
=== List A ===
- Highest team total: 349 for 4 (60 overs) by Somerset v Oxfordshire, 1994
- Lowest team total: 130 all out (43 overs) by Oxfordshire v Somerset, as above
- Highest individual innings: 116 by Marcus Trescothick for Somerset v Oxfordshire, as above
- Best bowling in an innings: 5-22 by Andre van Troost for Somerset v Oxfordshire, as above

== See also ==
- List of Oxfordshire County Cricket Club grounds
