= Keith Arnold (cricketer) =

English cricketer

Personal information
- Full name: Keith Andrew Arnold
- Born: 27 May 1960 (age 66); Solihull, Warwickshire, England
- Batting: Left-handed
- Bowling: Right-arm fast-medium

Domestic team information
- Years: Team
- 1985–1995: Minor Counties
- 1980–2010: Oxfordshire

Career statistics
Competition	First-class	List A
Matches	3	30
Runs scored	0	60
Batting average	–	4.61
100s/50s	–/–	–/–
Top score	0*	20
Balls bowled	612	1,760
Wickets	10	26
Bowling average	31.40	48.15
5 wickets in innings	1	–
10 wickets in match	–	–
Best bowling	5/57	3/25
Catches/stumpings	3/–	6/–
- Source: Cricinfo, 26 May 2011

Keith Andrew Arnold (born 27 May 1960) is a former English first-class cricketer. Arnold was a left-handed batsman who bowled right-arm fast-medium. He was born at Solihull, Warwickshire.

Arnold made his debut for Oxfordshire in the 1980 Minor Counties Championship against Devon. Arnold played Minor counties cricket for Oxfordshire from 1980 to 2010, which included 208 Minor Counties Championship matches and 47 MCCA Knockout Trophy matches. He made his List A debut against Glamorgan in the 1980 Gillette Cup. He played fifteen further List A matches for Oxfordshire, the last coming against Herefordshire in the 1st round of the 2004 Cheltenham & Gloucester Trophy, which was held in 2003. In his sixteen List A matches for Oxfordshire, he took 14 wickets at a bowling average of 55.42, with best figures of 2/46. Arnold captained Oxfordshire for three seasons from 2002 to 2004, after which he gave up the captaincy.

Playing for Oxfordshire allowed him to represent the Minor Counties cricket team. He played three first-class matches for the team: against the Zimbabweans in 1985, the Indians in 1990, and the South Africans in 1994. In his three first-class matches, he took 10 wickets at an average of 31.40. His most notable appearance came against the Zimbabweans, with him taking figures of 5/57, his best in first-class cricket. He also played List A cricket for the Minor Counties, first appearing for them in limited-overs cricket against Kent in the 1985 Benson & Hedges Cup. He played thirteen further List A matches for the team, with the last coming in the 1995 Benson & Hedges Cup against Warwickshire. Arnold took 12 wickets in his fourteen matches for the team, at an average of 39.66, with best figures of 3/25. In total, Arnold took 26 wickets in 30 List A matches, at an average of 48.15, with best figures of 3/25.

Arnold retired from playing for Oxfordshire during the 2010 season. His 30 years at the county were the joint second longest playing time for the county, level with Charlie Walters and exceeded only by Stewart Lee. Arnold holds the record for the most Minor Counties Championship wickets for Oxfordshire, surpassing David Laitt's record of 670 in 2009. By the end of his career he had 682 wickets.
