= Simon Almaer =

English cricketer

Personal information
- Full name: Simon Ashley Almaer
- Born: 12 July 1969 (age 57); Wanstead, England
- Batting: Right-handed
- Bowling: Right-arm medium

Domestic team information
- Years: Team
- 1988: Oxford University Cricket Club

Career statistics
| Competition | First-class |
|---|---|
| Matches | 15 |
| Runs scored | 441 |
| Batting average | 19.17 |
| 100s/50s | 0/2 |
| Top score | 67 |
| Catches/stumpings | 6/– |
- Source: , 9 August 2008

Simon Ashley Almaer (born 12 July 1969) is an English first-class cricketer who has played for Oxford University Cricket Club. His highest score of 67 came when playing for Oxford University against Lancashire County Cricket Club.

He also played in a match for the USA against Canada in a non-first-class match.
