= Philip Evans (cricketer) =

English cricketer (born 1982)

Philip Evans (born 30 March 1982) was an English cricketer. He was a right-handed batsman and a right-arm medium-fast bowler who played for Oxfordshire. He was born in Oxford.

Evans made a single List A appearance for the side, during the 2001 season, against Huntingdonshire. From the tailend, he scored 1 not out with the bat, and took figures of 1–47 with the ball.

Evans continued to represent the team in the Minor Counties Championship until 2006.

Evans's twin brother, Ian, also played for Oxfordshire.
