= David Laitt =

English cricketer

Personal information
- Full name: David James Laitt
- Born: 3 March 1931; Oxford, Oxfordshire, England
- Died: 27 June 1998 (aged 67); Croydon, London, England
- Batting: Right-handed
- Bowling: Right-arm medium

Domestic team information
- Years: Team
- 1952–1972: Oxfordshire
- 1959–1960: Minor Counties
- 1972–1973: Minor Counties South

Career statistics
Competition	First-class	List A
Matches	2	9
Runs scored	25	84
Batting average	12.50	16.80
100s/50s	0/0	0/0
Top score	10	31*
Balls bowled	340	559
Wickets	6	14
Bowling average	31.00	18.78
5 wickets in innings	0	0
10 wickets in match	0	0
Best bowling	4/58	3/28
Catches/stumpings	2/–	2/–
- Source: Cricinfo, 27 May 2011

David James Laitt (3 May 1931 – 27 June 1998) was an English cricketer. Laitt was a right-handed batsman who bowled right-arm medium pace. It was while doing National Service with the Royal Air Force that he was told to concentrate on his bowling, having started off as a batsman.

He was born in Oxford, England. He was educated at Magdalen College, Oxford. Laitt made his debut for Oxfordshire in the 1952 Minor Counties Championship against Berkshire. Laitt played Minor counties cricket for Oxfordshire from 1952 to 1972, which included 116 Minor Counties Championship matches. He made his List A debut against Cambridgeshire in the 1967 Gillette Cup. He played 2 further List A matches for Oxfordshire, against Worcestershire in 1970, and Durham in 1972. In his 3 List A matches for Oxfordshire, he took 6 wickets at a bowling average of 14.33, with best figures of 3/29. By the end of his career with Oxfordshire, Laitt was the counties leading wicket taker in Minor counties cricket, finishing with 670 wickets at an average of just 16.70. This record stood until it was surpassed by Keith Arnold in 2009.

Playing Minor counties cricket for Oxfordshire allowed him to represent the Minor Counties cricket team. He made 2 first-class appearances for the team against: the Indians in 1959 and the South Africans in 1960. In his 2 first-class matches, he took 6 wickets at an average of 31.00, with best figures of 4/58. Laitt also appeared in List A cricket for Minor Counties South, making 6 appearances spread over the 1972 Benson & Hedges Cup and the 1973 Benson & Hedges Cup. He took 8 wickets in his 6 appearances for the team, coming at an average of 22.12 and with best figures of 3/28.

Outside of cricket, Laitt worked as a computer administrator. He worked for 12 years at the Atomic Energy Research Establishment in Harwell, before working at Heathrow Airport. Laitt died in Croydon, Surrey, on 27 June 1998. He was survived by his wife Heather, son Roger Laitt and daughter Deborah.
