= Peter Eele =

English cricketer (1935–2019)

Personal information
- Full name: Peter James Eele
- Born: 27 January 1935; Taunton, Somerset, England
- Died: 25 January 2019 (aged 83); Wellington, Somerset, England
- Batting: Left-handed
- Role: Wicketkeeper

Domestic team information
- Years: Team
- 1958–1965: Somerset
- First-class debut: 31 May 1958 Somerset v Sussex
- Last First-class: 21 June 1965 Somerset v Cambridge University
- List A debut: 27 May 1964 Somerset v Nottinghamshire
- Last List A: 10 May 1969 Devon v Hertfordshire

Career statistics
Competition	First-class	List A
Matches	54	3
Runs scored	612	12
Batting average	12.24	4.00
100s/50s	1/0	0/0
Top score	103*	6
Catches/stumpings	87/19	4/0
- Source: CricketArchive, 6 July 2008

Peter James Eele (27 January 1935 – 25 January 2019) was an English first-class cricketer who played for Somerset and was later a first-class umpire.

Eele was a lower-order left-handed batsman and a wicketkeeper. He was the reserve wicketkeeper to Harold Stephenson at Somerset in the late 1950s and early 1960s, and his first-class cricket career was dictated largely by Stephenson's state of health. So 43 of Eele's 54 first-class matches came in two seasons: 1958, when Stephenson was injured for the second half of the season, and 1964, when Stephenson was able to play only three times. When Stephenson left the county somewhat unwillingly at the end of the 1964 season, Somerset recruited Geoff Clayton of Lancashire as his wicketkeeping replacement. Eele stayed as Clayton's deputy for a couple of seasons, but then left the staff.

Eele's batting was his weak point. He passed 40 in a first-class innings only once, though he then went on to make an unbeaten 103 against the Pakistan Eaglets team in 1963. As a wicketkeeper, he was "tidy and unshowy".

After leaving Somerset, Eele played Minor Counties cricket for Devon. From 1981 to 1984 and then again from 1989 to 1990 he was on the first-class umpires list. He umpired 124 first-class and 101 List A matches.
