= Kevin Hughes (Australian footballer) =

Australian rules footballer

Personal information
- Full name: Kevin Hughes
- Born: 12 January 1963 (age 63)
- Original team: Williamstown (VFA)
- Height: 176 cm (5 ft 9 in)
- Weight: 82 kg (181 lb)

Playing career^{1}
Years	Club	Games (Goals)
1988	North Melbourne	1 (0)
- ^{1} Playing statistics correct to the end of 1988.

Kevin Hughes (born 12 January 1963) is a former Australian rules footballer who played with North Melbourne in the Victorian Football League (VFL).

Originally from Williamstown Juniors FC, Hughes made his way up through the ranks of Williamstown United, Spotswood and South Melbourne Thirds before making his VFA senior debut with Williamstown in 1982. He played a total of 53 senior games with the VFA Seagulls kicking 56 goals and played in Williamstown's losing 1985 grand final side and was awarded the most consistent player trophy in that year. Hughes played in Williamstown Seconds' premiership team in 1986 and was named in the centre in Williamstown's 1980's Team of the Decade. He returned to Williamstown after his season with North Melbourne, which was interrupted by a serious knee injury, and he didn't play senior football again until 1991. Hughes went back to Spotswood in 1992.
