= Kevin Hughes (cricketer) =

English cricketer

Personal information
- Full name: Kevin John Hughes
- Born: 14 March 1966 (age 60); Banbury, Oxfordshire, England
- Batting: Right-handed
- Role: Wicket-keeper

Domestic team information
- Years: Team
- 1991–1992: Oxfordshire

Career statistics
Competition	List A
Matches	3
Runs scored	4
Batting average	4.00
100s/50s	–/–
Top score	4
Balls bowled	–
Wickets	–
Bowling average	–
5 wickets in innings	–
10 wickets in match	–
Best bowling	–
Catches/stumpings	–/–
- Source: CricketArchive, 20 May 2011

Kevin John Hughes (born 14 March 1966) is a former English cricketer. Hughes was a right-handed batsman who fielded as a wicket-keeper. He was born in Banbury, Oxfordshire.

Hughes made his debut for Oxfordshire in a List A match in the 1991 NatWest Trophy against Surrey, with the match being abandoned. He played 2 further List A matches, against Surrey in a replay of the abandoned match and against Lancashire in the 1992 NatWest Trophy. In his 3 List A matches he scored 4 runs. He didn't represent Oxfordshire in Minor counties cricket.
