= Giles Peddy =

English cricketer

Giles Peddy (born 16 April 1978) was an English cricketer. He was a right-handed batsman and a right-arm off-break bowler who played for Oxfordshire. He was born in Hemel Hempstead.

Peddy, who played in the Minor Counties Championship between 1998 and 2003, made a single List A appearance for the team, in the C&G Trophy in August 2003, against Herefordshire. He played many championship and one-day games for Oxfordshire, and also played for the Minor Counties U25 XI and NAYC England U19s. He has played club cricket for Oxford Downs CC, Oxford CC, Hampstead CC and Chorleywood CC.
