= Ian Evans (cricketer) =

English cricketer

Personal information
- Full name: Ian James Evans
- Born: 30 March 1982 (age 44); Oxford, Oxfordshire, England
- Batting: Right-handed
- Bowling: Right-arm off break
- Relatives: Philip Evans (twin brother)

Domestic team information
- Years: Team
- 2001–2004: Oxfordshire

Career statistics
Competition	List A
Matches	3
Runs scored	21
Batting average	7.00
100s/50s	–/–
Top score	18
Balls bowled	36
Wickets	1
Bowling average	36.00
5 wickets in innings	–
10 wickets in match	–
Best bowling	1/36
Catches/stumpings	1/–
- Source: Cricinfo, 19 May 2011

Ian James Evans (born 30 March 1982) is an English cricketer. Evans is a right-handed batsman who bowls right-arm off break. He was born in Oxford, Oxfordshire.

Evans made his debut for Oxfordshire in the 2001 Minor Counties Championship against Wales Minor Counties. Evans played Minor counties cricket for Oxfordshire from 2001 to 2004, which included 11 Minor Counties Championship matches. He made his List A debut against Huntingdonshire in the 2001 Cheltenham & Gloucester Trophy. He played 2 further List A matches, against the Nottinghamshire Cricket Board in the 1st round of the 2002 Cheltenham & Gloucester Trophy which was held in 2001 and against Shropshire in the 2nd round which was also played in 2001. In his 3 List A matches he scored 21 runs at a batting average of 7.00, with a high score of 18. With the ball he took a single wicket for the cost of 36 runs.

His twin brother, Philip, has also played Minor counties and List A cricket for Oxfordshire.
