= Craig Haupt =

South African-born English cricketer

Personal information
- Full name: Craig Arend Haupt
- Born: 25 June 1972 (age 54); Cape Town, Cape Province, South Africa
- Batting: Left-handed
- Bowling: Right-arm medium
- Relatives: Dale Haupt (nephew)

Domestic team information
- Years: Team
- 1999–2012: Oxfordshire

Career statistics
Competition	List A
Matches	4
Runs scored	182
Batting average	60.66
100s/50s	1/–
Top score	126*
Balls bowled	74
Wickets	1
Bowling average	56.00
5 wickets in innings	–
10 wickets in match	–
Best bowling	1/33
Catches/stumpings	2/–
- Source: Cricinfo, 20 May 2011

Craig Arend Haupt (born 25 June 1972) is a South African-born English former cricketer.

Haupt was born at Cape Town in June 1972. In South Africa, he represented South Africa Under-19s and played minor matches for Western Province, prior to moving to England to become the professional at Banbury Cricket Club Following success at club level with Banbury, Haupt made his debut for Oxfordshire in a List A one-day match against the Durham Cricket Board in the 1999 NatWest Trophy at Hartlepool. He played List A cricket for Oxfordshire until 2001, making a total of four appearances. He scored 182 runs in these matches, at an average of 60.66; he made one century, a score of 126 not out against the Nottinghamshire Cricket Board at Oxford in 2001. He also took a single wicket his medium pace bowling in List A cricket. In addition to playing List A one-day cricket for Oxfordshire, Haupt also played minor counties cricket for Oxfordshire from 2000 to 2012, making 35 appearances in the Minor Counties Championship and 27 appearances in the MCCA Knockout Trophy.

In 2018, he became the first player to score 10,000 runs in the Home Counties Premier Cricket League. For Banbury, he has made 24 centuries and 57 half centuries. His former teammate Neal Radford considered him capable of playing at a higher level, while his former captain at Banbury, Jimmy Phillips, considered him the best slip fielder in the country at any level in the late 1990s and early 2000s. Haupt underwent knee surgery in his early 40s, but continued to play club cricket. His nephew, Dale, has played first-class cricket in South Africa.
