= Morris Motors Sports Ground =

Cricket ground in Cowley, Oxfordshire, England

Coordinates: 51°44′19.25″N 1°12′30.63″W

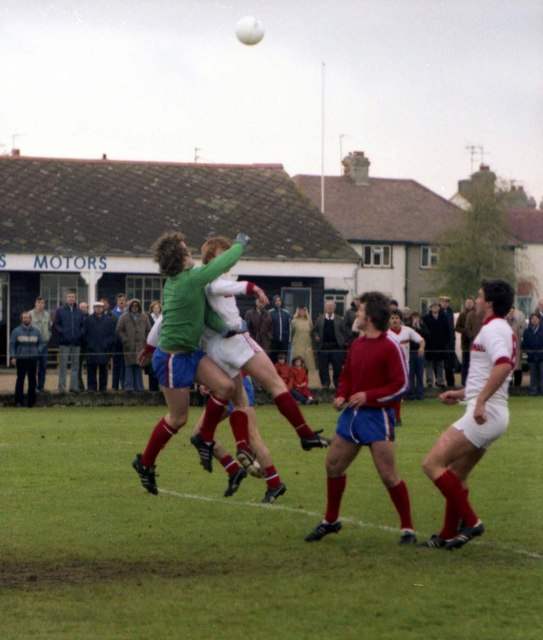

Ground information
- Location: Cowley, Oxfordshire
- Establishment: 1920s

Team information
Oxfordshire	(1954-1991)
- As of 15 August 2010; Source: Ground profile

Morris Motors Sports Ground was a cricket ground in Cowley, Oxfordshire.

The ground was built and initially owned by Morris Motors in the 1920s, under the guidance of its founder William Morris, 1st Viscount Nuffield.

The first recorded match on the ground was in 1954, when Oxfordshire played their first Minor Counties Championship match at the ground in the against Buckinghamshire. From 1954 to 1991, the ground hosted 32 Minor Counties Championship matches, with the final Minor Counties Championship match seeing Oxfordshire play Berkshire.

The ground has also held List-A matches. The first List-A match saw Oxfordshire play Worcestershire in the 1970 Gillette Cup. In 1972 Oxfordshire played Durham in the 1972 Gillette Cup, with the final List-A match held on the ground between Oxfordshire and Cornwall in the 1975 Gillette Cup.

After over 50 years at the ground, Morris Motors Cricket Club were removed from it by the Morris Motors Athletic & Social Club, the custodians of the ground, shortly before the start of the 2003 season, sparking claims of racism; the social club denied this, claiming the cricket club's removal was a financial decision.
