= Mike Nurton =

English cricketer

Personal information
- Full name: Michael Dennis Nurton
- Born: 11 January 1943 (age 83); Botley, Berkshire, England
- Batting: Left-handed

Domestic team information
- Years: Team
- 1963–1987: Oxfordshire
- 1974–1979: Minor Counties South
- 1977–1978: Minor Counties West
- 1982: Minor Counties

Career statistics
Competition	List A
Matches	27
Runs scored	597
Batting average	11.88
100s/50s	0/5
Top score	46
Balls bowled	282
Wickets	5
Bowling average	29.80
5 wickets in innings	0
10 wickets in match	0
Best bowling	2/29
Catches/stumpings	2/–
- Source: Cricinfo, 28 May 2011

Michael Dennis Nurton (born 11 January 1943) is a former English cricketer. Nurton was a left-handed batsman, although his bowling style is unknown. He was born in Botley, Berkshire (since 1974 in Oxfordshire).

Nurton made his debut for Oxfordshire in the 1963 Minor Counties Championship against Dorset. Nurton played Minor counties cricket for Oxfordshire from 1963 to 1990, which included 218 Minor Counties Championship matches and 9 MCCA Knockout Trophy matches. He made his List A debut against Worcestershire in the 1970 Gillette Cup. He played 10 further List A matches for Oxfordshire, the last coming against Leicestershire in the 1987 NatWest Trophy. By the end of his Minor Counties career with Oxfordshire in 1990, he had scored 12,713 runs in the Minor Counties Championship, more than anyone else in Minor Counties history.

Playing for Oxfordshire allowed him to represent the Minor Counties cricket teams. He first played for Minor Counties South in the 1974 Benson & Hedges Cup against Glamorgan. Nurton played 6 further List A matches for Minor Counties South, the last coming against Glamorgan in the 1979 Benson & Hedges Cup. In addition, he played 8 List A match for Minor Counties West in the 1977 Benson & Hedges Cup and 1978 Benson & Hedges Cup. He also appeared once for a combined Minor Counties cricket team in the 1982 Benson & Hedges Cup against Derbyshire. In total, Nurton played 27 List A matches in his career. In these he scored 597 runs at a batting average of 23.88, with 5 half centuries and a high score of 70. With the ball, he took 5 wickets at a bowling average of 29.80, with best figures of 2/29.
