= Arwyn Jones =

English cricketer (born 1971)

Arwyn Jones (born 2 July 1971) was an English cricketer. He was a left-handed batsman and left-arm slow bowler who played List A and Minor counties cricket for Oxfordshire and later Devon. He was born in Devizes, Wiltshire.

Jones, who played for three seasons in Durham's Second XI, and who represented Oxfordshire and Devon in the Minor Counties Championship between 1994 and 2007, made a single List A appearance, during the 1996 season, against Lancashire. He scored 5 not out and took figures of 0-34 from four overs of bowling.
