= Anthony Buck (cricketer) =

English cricketer (born 1941)

Anthony Buck (born 9 October 1941) was an English cricketer. He was a right-handed batsman and a right-arm medium-fast bowler who played for Oxfordshire. He was born in Oxford.

Buck, who played in the Minor Counties Championship between 1966 and 1970, made a single List A appearance for the side, during the 1967 season, against Cambridgeshire. From the tailend, he scored 3 not out.

He conceded 14 runs from 4 overs of bowling.
