= Arwen Colles =

Area of small hills on Titan

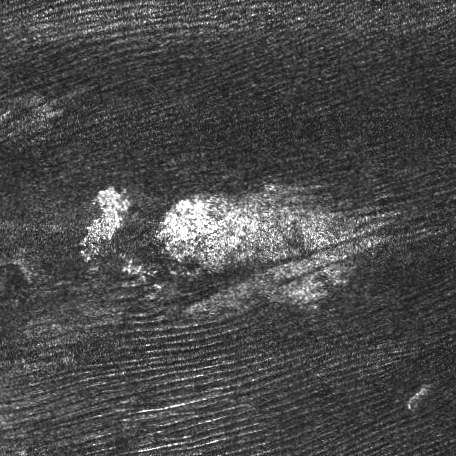
Arwen Colles: radar image by Cassini. Thin dark streaks around are dunes.

Arwen Colles is an area of small hills on Titan, the largest moon of the planet Saturn. The hills are located near Titan's equator at 7.5°S 260°W within the Belet region.

Arwen Colles is named after Arwen Undómiel, an Elvish princess in J. R. R. Tolkien's fictional world of Middle Earth who appears most prominently in The Lord of the Rings. The name follows a convention that Titanean colles (hills or small knobs) are named after characters in Tolkien's work. It was formally announced on December 19, 2012.
