= Oxford University Cricket Club =

Cricket club representing the University of Oxford

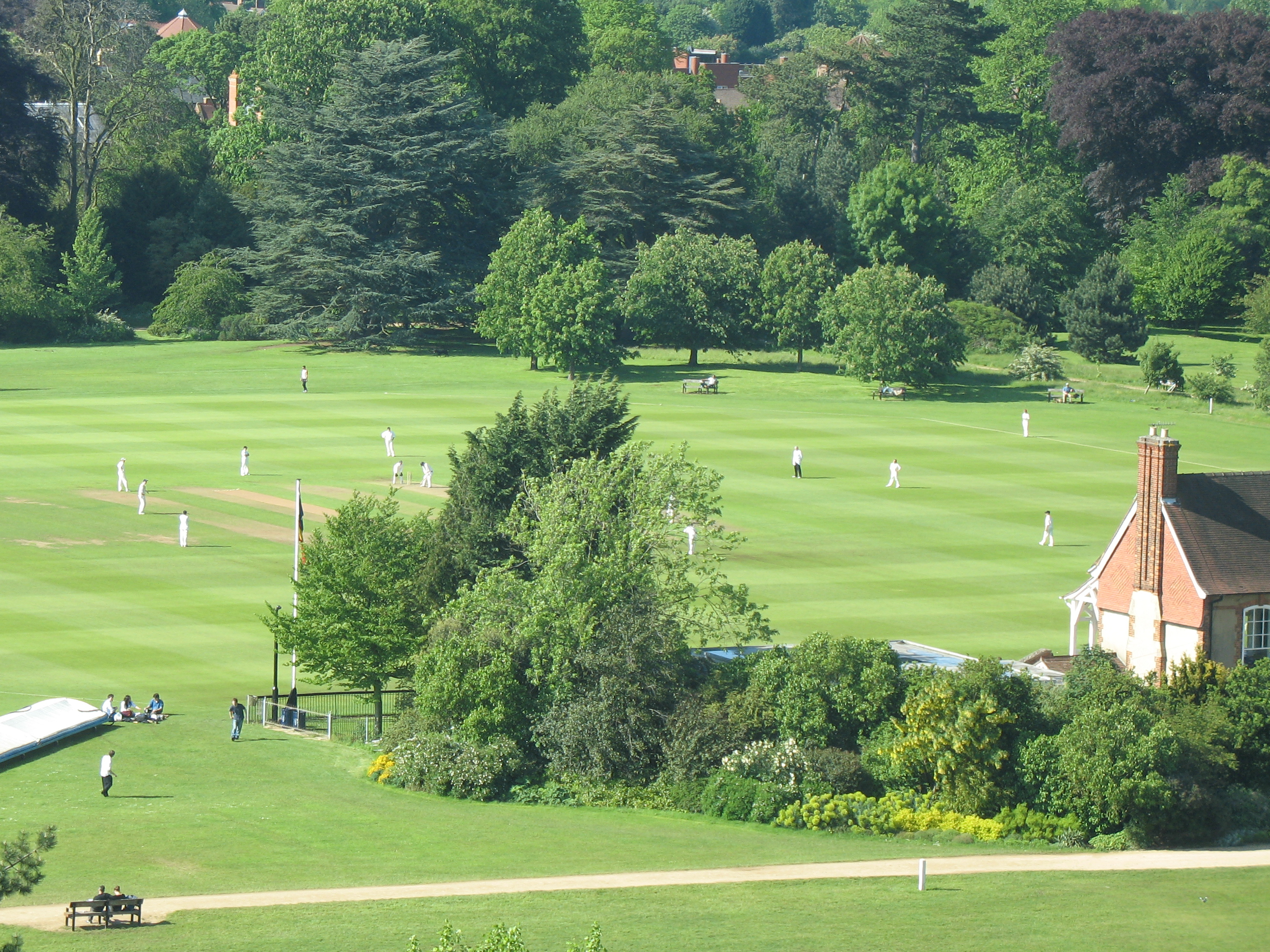
- The club grounds in 2006

Personnel
- Captain: Justin Clarke
- Coach: Graham Charlesworth

Team information
- Founded: 1827
- Home ground: University Parks

History
- First-class debut: Cambridge University in 1827 at Lord's
- Official website: cricketintheparks.org.uk

Oxford University Cricket Club (OUCC), which represents the University of Oxford, has played since 1827 when it made its debut in the inaugural University Match between OUCC and Cambridge University Cricket Club (CUCC). Following the 2021 University Match, OUCC lost its major status. It was classified as a List A team in 1973 only. Home fixtures are played at the University Parks slightly northeast of Oxford city centre.

== History ==
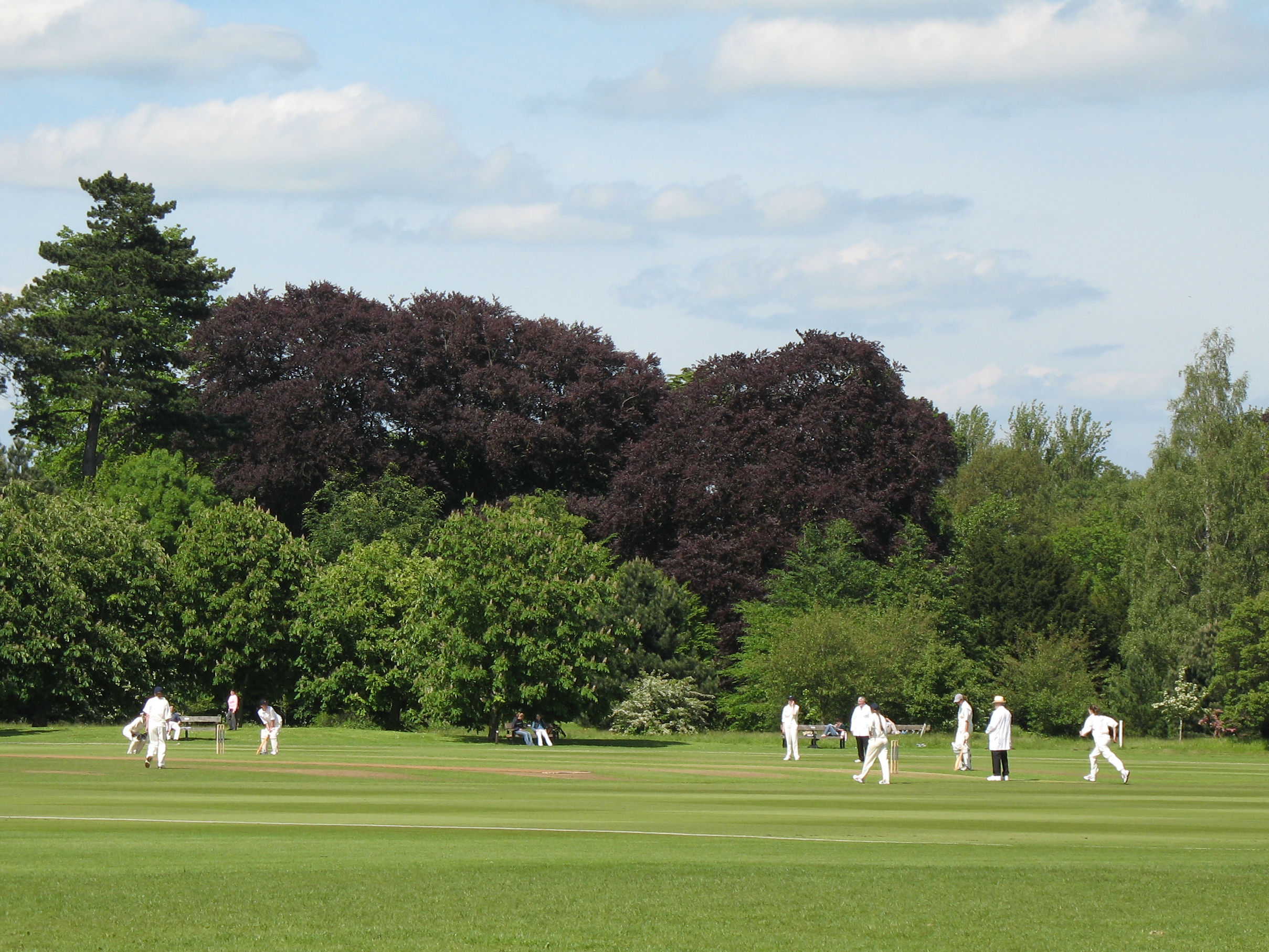
A cricket match at The Parks, MCC Universities Championship 2006

The earliest reference to cricket at Oxford is in 1673. OUCC made its known debut in the inaugural University Match between Oxford and Cambridge played in 1827. In terms of extant clubs being involved, this is the oldest major fixture in the world: i.e., although some inter-county fixtures are much older, none of the current county clubs were founded before 1839 (the oldest known current fixture is Kent versus Surrey).

The Magdalen Ground was used for the University Cricket Club's first match in 1829, and remain in regular use until 1880. Bullingdon Green was used for two matches in 1843. The University Parks became the home ground of OUCC in 1881, when the Master of Pembroke, Evan Evans obtaining a lease on 10 acres of land there. The pavilion was designed by Thomas G. Jackson, architect of many nineteenth- and early twentieth-century Oxford buildings, including the university's Examination Schools. The building has three gables, the central one containing the clock, and is topped by a cupola and weather-vane. The pavilion contains a Long Room. The two ends of the pitch are the Pavilion End and the Norham Gardens End.

The University Match became the club's sole fixture each season from 2001 until 2020. Apart from this annual game, played in late June or early July, the OUCC first team operates as part of the Oxford University Centre of Cricketing Excellence (UCCE), which includes Oxford Brookes University. The UCCE was rebranded as Oxford MCC University (MCCU) prior to the 2010 season. The University Match is the only one in which a true OUCC team takes part: i.e., composed entirely of current Oxford students.

The Oxford University Centre of Cricketing Excellence (OUCCE) team played 26 matches (not including one abandoned) from 2001 to 2009. As Oxford Marylebone Cricket Club University, the team has played sixteen matches from 2010 to 2016.

== Grounds ==
The five grounds that Oxford University have used for home and List A matches since 1829 are listed below, with statistics complete through to the end of the 2014 season. Only the major matches played at the ground by Oxford University are recorded in the table.

Name	Location	First	Last	Matches	First	Last	Matches	Refs
Name	Location				List A			Refs
Magdalen Ground	Oxford	5 June 1829 v Cambridge University	20 May 1912 v South Africans	70	—	—	0	
Bullingdon Green	Oxford	24 May 1843 v Marylebone Cricket Club	8 June 1843 v Cambridge University	2	—	—	0	
Christ Church Ground	Oxford	3 June 1878 v Gentlemen of England	31 May 1961 v Australians	37	—	—	0	
University Parks	Oxford	16 May 1881 v Marylebone Cricket Club	2 July 2018 v Cambridge University	738	28 April 1973 v Leicestershire	7 May 1973 v Warwickshire	2	
New College Ground	Oxford	31 May 1906 v Yorkshire	30 May 1907 v South Africans	2	—	—	0	

== See also ==
- List of Oxford University CC players
