= Oxfordshire County Cricket Club =

English cricket club

Team information
- Founded: 1921
- Home ground: Various

History
- Minor Counties Championship wins: 5
- Official website: Oxfordshire CCC

Oxfordshire County Cricket Club is one of twenty minor county clubs within the domestic cricket structure of England and Wales. It represents the historic county of Oxfordshire.

The team is currently a member of the Minor Counties Championship Western Division and plays in the MCCA Knockout Trophy. Oxfordshire played List A matches occasionally from 1967 until 2004 but is not classified as a List A team per se.

== Grounds ==
The club plays matches at Banbury CC, Great & Little Tew, Challow and Childrey, Radley College, Bicester & North Oxford, Aston Rowant and Thame. There are plans to expand this range of venues. Oxfordshire County Cricket Club is an integrated part of the Oxfordshire Cricket Board.

== Honours ==
- National Counties Championship (5) - 1929, 1974, 1982, 1989, 2021; shared (0) -
- NCCA Knockout Trophy (0) -

== Earliest cricket ==
Cricket probably reached Oxfordshire by the end of the 16th century. Although "not cricket", a 1523 reference to stoolball has been found (see Rowland Bowen's history) re a designated field in Oxfordshire.

The earliest reference to cricket in the county is at the University of Oxford in 1673. Dr Samuel Johnson stated that he played cricket during his time at the university; he was there in 1729 for one year only.

One of the earliest references to cricket in Oxfordshire was in the Reading Mercury on Monday 4 October 1779: "On Tues. Oct 5 at Henley, the County of Berks v the County of Oxford, for £25 a side". This is the first known mention of an Oxfordshire county team. Berkshire was rated an important team at the time, but this was a minor match.

== Origin of club ==
There was a county organisation in 1787, according to Wisden. Oxfordshire competed in the first two Minor Counties Championship competitions in 1895 and 1896, and an Oxfordshire side also appeared in the competition from 1900 to 1906. The present Oxfordshire CCC was founded on 14 December 1921 and has been a member of the Minor Counties since the 1922 season.

== Club history ==
Oxfordshire has won the Minor Counties Championship five times. It won the title outright in 1929, 1974, 1982, 1989 and 2021.

Oxfordshire has never won the MCCA Knockout Trophy since its inception in 1983 but in recent years has suffered 2 narrow final defeats.

== Notable players ==
See List of Oxfordshire CCC List A players and Category:Oxfordshire cricketers

The following Oxfordshire cricketers also made an impact on the first-class game:

- Daniel Rowe
- John Arnold
- Jonathan Batty
- Buck Divecha
- Andrew Strauss
- Robert Cunliffe
- Tim Hancock
- S. A. Hatteea
- Charles Williams, later Lord Williams of Elvel, sometime UK government minister
