= Ivy Lane Club =

Literary and social club founded by Samuel Johnson

The Ivy Lane Club was a literary and social club founded by Samuel Johnson in the 1740s. The club met in the King's Head, a beefsteak house in Ivy Lane, Paternoster Row, near St Paul's Cathedral, London.

The members included Edmond Barker, doctor; Richard Bathurst, physician and surgeon; Samuel Dyer, gentleman; John Hawkesworth, author; Sir John Hawkins, author; William McGhie, doctor; John Payne, bookseller (i.e. publisher); John Ryland, merchant; Dr Samuel Salter, Archdeacon of Norwich.

== See also ==
- The Club – another London dining club, founded in the 1760s
