= Life of Samuel Johnson (Hawkins book) =

Biography by John Hawkins

The Life of Samuel Johnson or Life of Samuel Johnson, LL. D. was written by John Hawkins in 1787. It was the first full biography of Samuel Johnson—with Thomas Tyers's A Biographical Sketch of Dr Samuel Johnson being the first short postmortem biography. Hawkins was a friend of Johnson's, but many in Johnson's circle did not like him. After Johnson's death, Hawkins was approached to produce a biography of Johnson and an edition of his works. His biography described Johnson's life, including previously unknown details about his writing career, but it was plagued by digressions into unrelated topics. Hawkins's Life of Samuel Johnson came under swift attack from critics, friends of Johnson's, and his literary rival, James Boswell immediately after its publication. Many of the critics attacked Hawkins for his lack of a strict focus on Johnson's life or for his unfavourable depiction of Johnson in various circumstances.

== Background ==
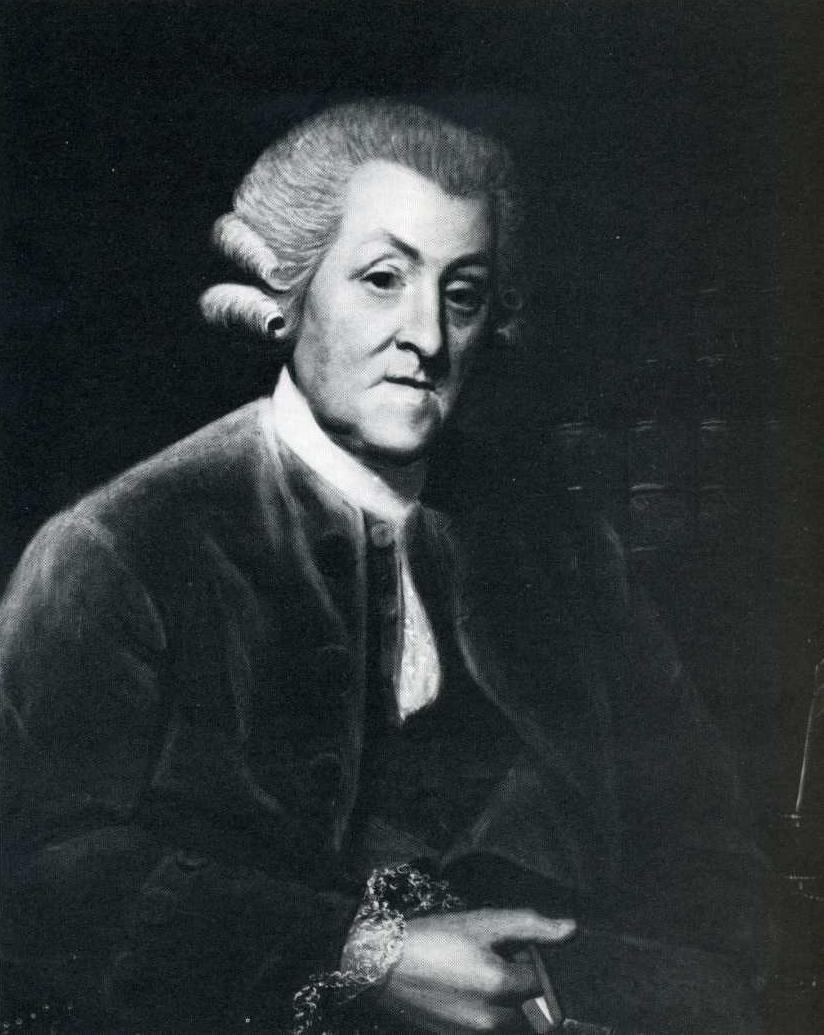
Sir John Hawkins

According to Bertram Davis, "For every person who remembers Sir John Hawkins as the author of the first full-length biography of Samuel Johnson, many remember him as the man Johnson once described as 'unclubable'." Although "unclubable" reflects Hawkins's relationship with others in Johnson's circle, Johnson and Hawkins had a close friendship as Miss Reynolds describes: "As we were returning from the meadows that day, I remember we met Sir John Hawkins, whom Dr. Johnson seemed much rejoiced to see; and no wonder, for I have often heard him speak of Sir John in terms expressive of great esteem and much cordiality of friendship" Their relationship began around 1739 and they were both involved with The Gentleman's Magazine. In 1749, Hawkins was a member of Johnson's first club: the Ivy Lane Club.

After joining the Ivy Lane club, he married Sidney Storer, heir to a 20,000 pound fortune with Hawkins receiving an addition 10,000 pound dowry, in 1753 and his career started to quickly pick up: he bought a home on the Thames at Twickenham near Horace Walpole; he published Izaak Walton's The Compleat Angler in 1760; he was appointed as a magistrate in 1761; in 1765 became Chairman of the Quarter Sessions for the County of Middlesex; and wrote a A General History of the Science and Practice of Music in 1776. He was knighted in 1772 and served as Chairman of the Quarter Session.

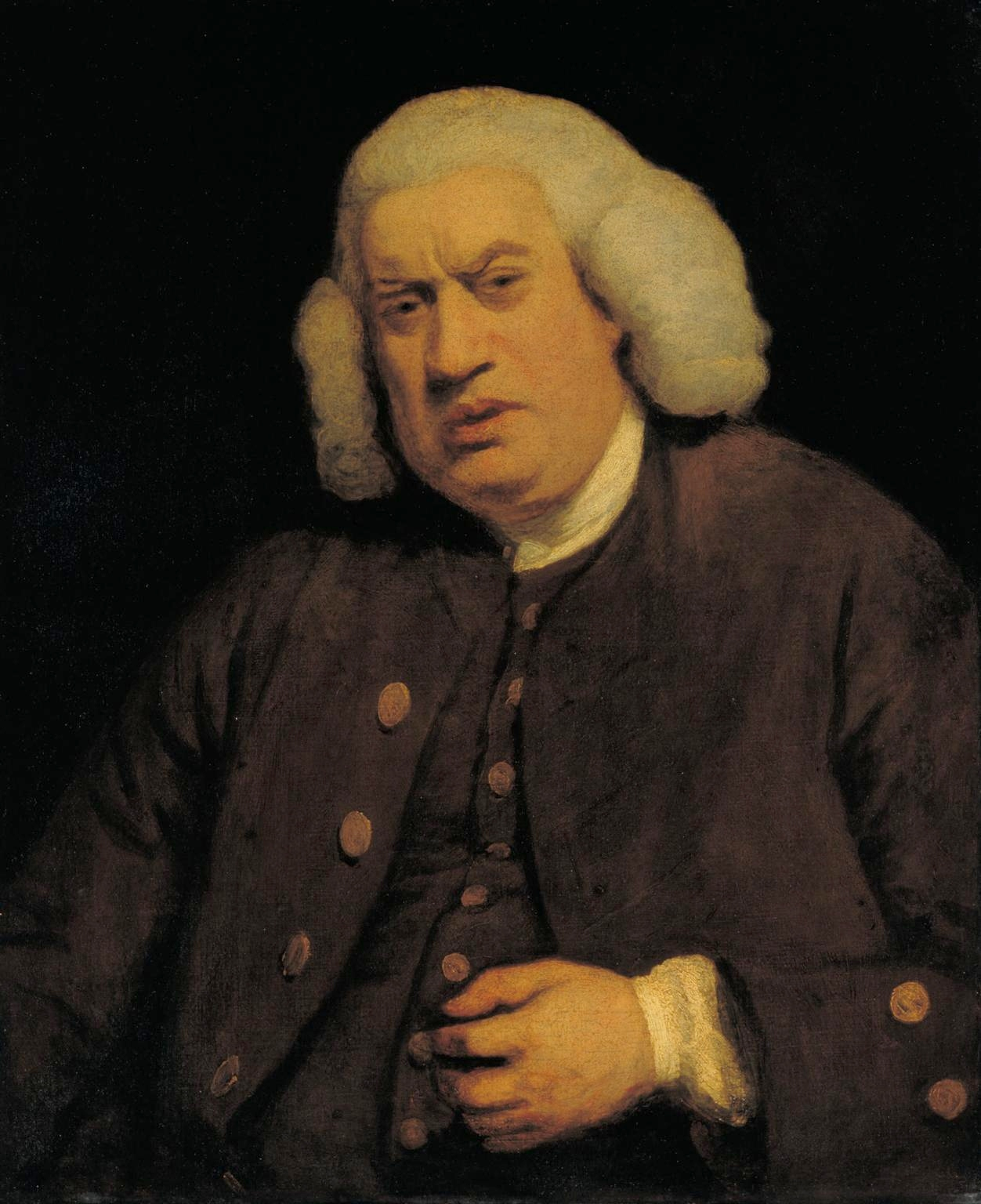
Samuel Johnson

Even with all the success, or because of it, he was resented among some of Johnson's circle. Hawkins, member of Johnson's second club, the Literary Club established 1764, resigned over a dispute with others of Johnson's circle. The relationship between Hawkins and the rest of Johnson's friends became so tense that many criticised Johnson for choosing Hawkins in 1784 as one of his executors for his will. However, within hours of Johnson's death, Thomas Cadell and William Strahan asked Hawkins to write a biography and an edition of Johnson's literary works.

On 16 December 1784, St. James's Chronicle stated that Hawkins and Boswell were both writing biographies. However, Thomas Tyers published before them when his A Biographical Sketch of Dr Samuel Johnson, the first postmortem biographical work on Johnson but not a full-length biography, ran in the December 1784 issue of The Gentleman's Magazine. This did not deter Hawkins, and by 21 December 1784, he began advertising his "authentick" life of Johnson. This provoked an anonymous article in St. James's Chronicle, which started by attacking Hawkins: "It is evident from the Conduct of the late Dr. Johnson, that he designed Mr. Boswell for the sole Writer of his Life. Why else did he furnish him with such Materials for it as were withheld from every other Friend ... Little indeed did he suppose that a Person whom he had made one of his Executors would have instantly claimed the Office of his Biographer. Still less could he have imagined that this Self-Appointment would have been precipitately confirmed by the Booksellers."

The source of the attack was George Steevens, who worked with Johnson on an edition of Shakespeare's plays and was a constant critic of Hawkins. He, along with others, began to spread rumours about Hawkins: some claimed that he stole Johnson's belongings after his death, and others claimed that Hawkins wanted to slander Johnson in his biography. Hawkins house burned down on 23 February 1785, and he was barely able to preserve his notes and Johnson's diaries, which were the foundations for his Life. The work was published in March 1787. St. James's Chronicle and London Chronicle published excerpts for "several weeks" with the Universal Magazine and the Political Magazine following later. A second edition was published mid-April 1787.

== Biography ==
The biography is a standard biography describing incidents of Johnson's life. One of the unique features that made Hawkins's Life special was its ability to provide information on Johnson's contributions to The Gentleman's Magazine. The biography revealed details about the events surrounding the early years of the magazine and events that happened between employees, which provided insights into the literary magazine not published before.

Boswell was unable to publish his Life until 1791, but when he did, he introduced his work with a summary of what he felt Hawkins's biography contained:

Since my work was announced, several Lives and Memoirs of Dr. Johnson have been published, the most voluminous of which is one compiled for the booksellers of London, by Sir John Hawkins, Knight, a man, whom, during my long intimacy with Dr. Johnson, I never saw in his company, I think but once, and I am sure not above twice. Johnson might have esteemed him for his decent, religious demeanour, and his knowledge of books and literary history; but from the rigid formalities of his manners, it is evident that they never could have lived together with companionable ease and familiarity; nor had Sir John Hawkins that nice perception which was necessary to mark the finer and less obvious parts of Johnson's character. His being appointed one of his executors, gave him an opportunity of taking possession of such fragments of a diary and other papers as were left; of which, before delivering them up to the residuary legatee, whose property they were, he endeavoured to extract the substance. In this he has not been very successful, as I have found upon a perusal of those papers, which have been since transferred to me. Sir John Hawkins's ponderous labours, I must acknowledge, exhibit a farrago, of which a considerable portion is not devoid of entertainment to the lovers of literary gossipping; but besides its being swelled out with long unnecessary extracts from various works, (even one of several leaves from Osborne's Harleian Catalogue, and those not compiled by Johnson, but by Oldys,) a very small part of it relates to the person who is the subject of the book; and, in that, there is such an inaccuracy in the statement of facts, as in so solemn an authour is hardly excusable, and certainly makes his narrative very unsatisfactory. But what is still worse, there is throughout the whole of it a dark uncharitable cast, by which the most unfavourable construction is put upon almost every circumstance in the character and conduct of my illustrious friend; who, I trust, will, be a true and fair delineation, be vindicated both from the injurious misrepresentation of this authour, and from the slighter aspersions of a lady who once lived in great intimacy with him."

Hawkins and Hester Thrale, in Boswell's mind, were rivals to "what he considered his domain". That is not to say that he was wrong about Hawkins's Life because it does contain many digressions, such as a discussion of sixteenth century breakfast habits written in Latin and a discussion on the history of taverns among others. Hawkins also included long extracts from Johnson's works.

== Critical response ==
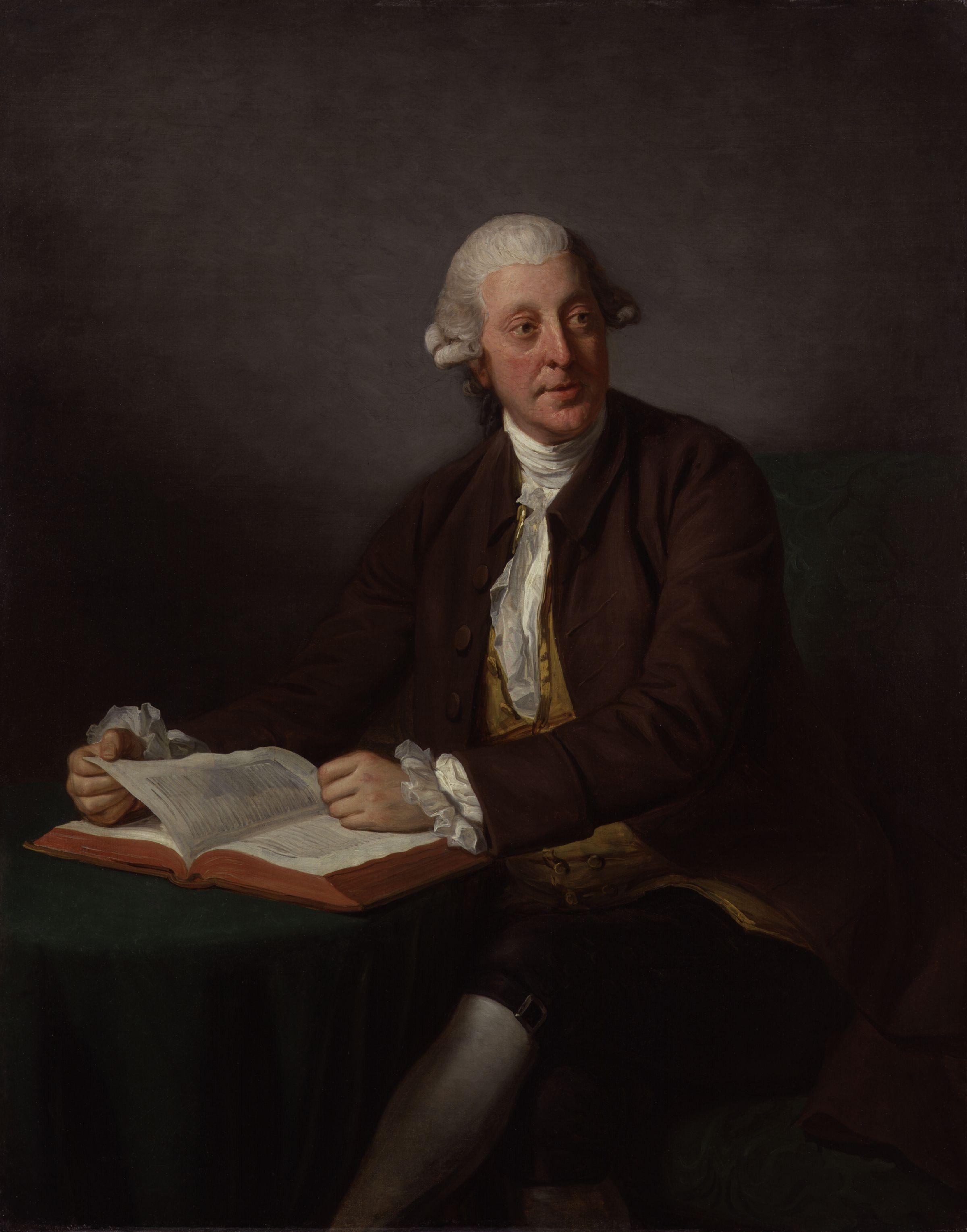
Arthur Murphy, fellow Johnson biographer and reviewer of Hawkins's Life

The Monthly Review, the Critical Review, the English Review, and the European Magazine contained reviews that, in the words of Bertram Davis, characterised the biography as "a malevolent and spiteful account of Johnson's life, grossly inaccurate, and rendered utterly ridiculous by its pompous legalisms and its digressions on every conceivable subject. The book, if they were to be believed, was less a biography than a polemic, less a work of art than a collection of senile gossip." In particular, the Critical Review said, "we often lose Dr. Johnson.... The knight sinks under the weight of his subject, and is glad to escape to scenes more congenial to his disposition, and more suitable to his talents, the garrulity of a literary old man."

Arthur Murphy anonymously wrote in the Monthly Review: "Sir John most probably acquired his notions of language at his master's desk: he admired the phraseology of deeds and parchments, whereof, to speak in his own manner, he read so much, that in consequence thereof, he has been chiefly conversant therein and by the help of the parchments aforesaid, missed the elegance above mentioned, and uses works, that in them we sometimes meet with, and being bred and attorney, he caught the language of the said trade, whereof he retains so much, that he is now rendered an incompetent critic thereby, and in consequence thereof." Steevens, under the name "Philo Johnson" claimed in the European Magazine: "the great solid principle that secures its condemnation, is the spirit of malevolence to the dead, which breathes all through it. Sir John Hawkins, with all the humanity and very little of the dexterity of a Clare-Market butcher, has raised his blunt axe to deface the image of his friend."

A later review in the St James's Chronicle joked: "It is not true 'that Mrs. Hobart had an intention of reading Sir John Hawkins' book. The late hours at which people of rank go to bed, renders it wholly unnecessary to force a sleep in public places." This followed with a joke in a later journal: a "gentleman, lately arrived in town, has been for several days past afflicted with a lethargy, owing to the perusal of three chapters in Hawkins' Life of Johnson." A third stated that the branches of "the famous willow tree planted at Lichfield by Johnson ... should be lopped off, and tied in bundles, ... and properly applied to the naked backs of his various biographers, taking care, that the largest bundle be appropriated unto the use and behoof of Sir John Hawkins, Knight."
