= James Roberts (painter) =

English painter

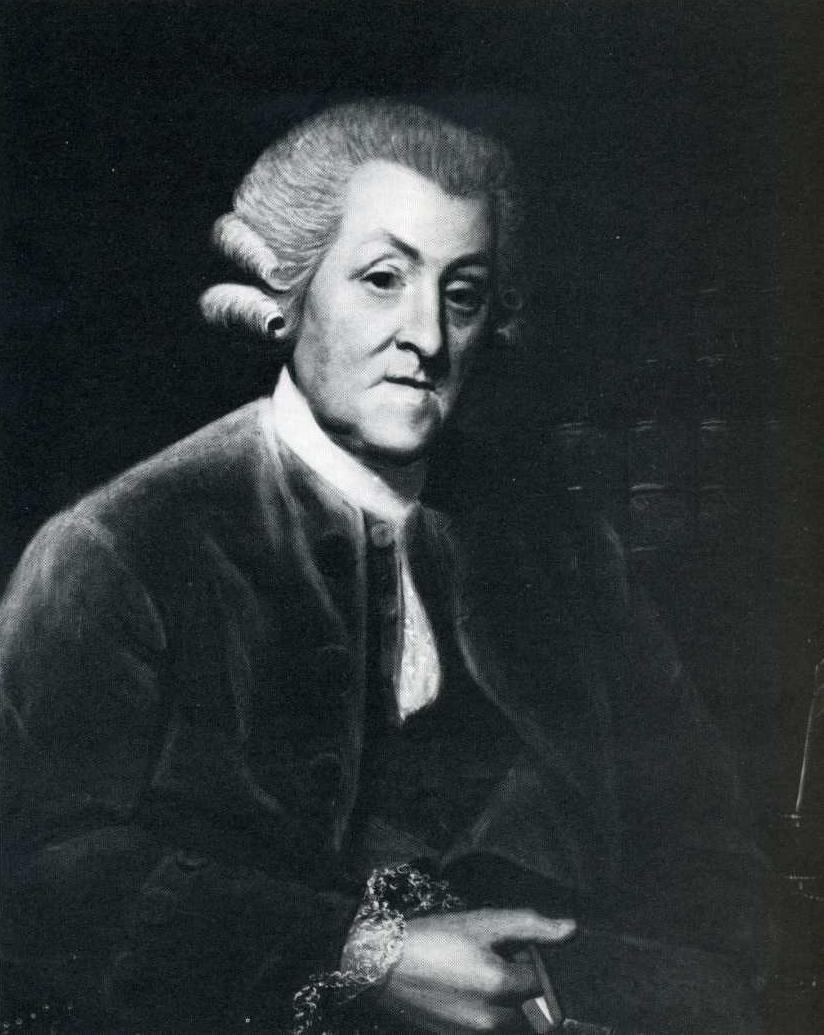
Sir John Hawkins 1786, after a painting by James Roberts

James Roberts (1753–ca.1809) was a painter active in England in the later 18th century. He is best known as a portraitist, though he also painted landscapes and miniatures.

== Early life ==
He was the son of a landscape engraver, also named James Roberts. He exhibited annually at the Royal Academy from 1773 to 1784.

Roberts worked on a set of dramatic portraits, to be engraved for the book series Bell's British Theatre. These were for John Bell, and were executed from 1775 to 1781, as a collection of over 60 watercolours on vellum.

== Oxford period ==
For a period Roberts worked in Oxford as a drawing master, where he fell under the influence of John Baptist Malchair. While at Oxford he painted his portrait of James Smithson, for Smithson's M.A. graduation in 1786.

During this period (around 1784 to 1795) Roberts made drawings of the sculptures of Anne Seymour Damer intended for a published series of engravings, but in the end only one issue of the engravings came out. He portrayed Philip Hayes in water-colour and in pastel. His portrait of John Hawkins was unique, the only portrait for which Hawkins sat. Laetitia Matilda Hawkins, daughter of Hawkins, considered that flattery from Hayes was the reason her father agreed to sit for Roberts, that the result was uncharacteristic, and that the book shown was a novel.

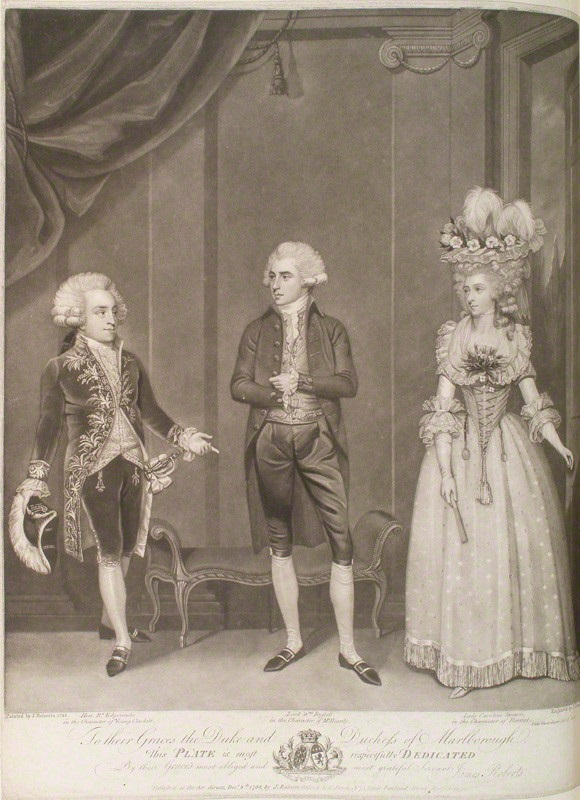
Marlborough Theatricals, 1788 engraving by John Jones after James Roberts, a scene from David Garrick's comedy The Guardian

Roberts was also a scene painter at Blenheim Palace, in 1788 and 1789. In 1789 he was designer for The Maid of the Oaks, and False Appearances. a translation by Henry Seymour Conway of Trompeurs Dehors by Louis de Boissy.

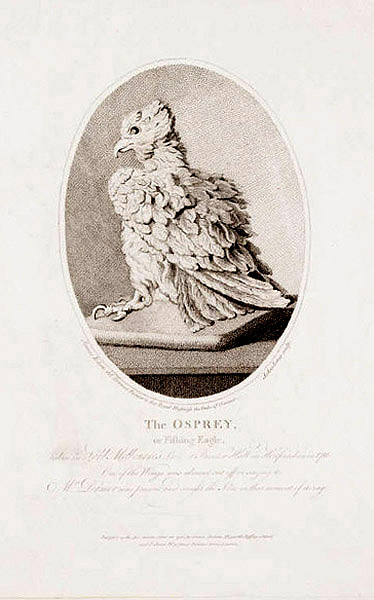
The Osprey, engraving of 1790 after Anne Damer and James Roberts

== Later life ==
By 1795, Roberts had an appointment as portrait painter to the Duke of Clarence. He exhibited again annually at the Royal Academy from 1795 to 1799. The National Portrait Gallery, London holds 52 portraits by Roberts or copied from his work.
