= A Biographical Sketch of Dr Samuel Johnson =

A Biographical Sketch of Dr Samuel Johnson was written by Thomas Tyers for The Gentleman's Magazine's December 1784 issue. The work was written immediately after the death of Samuel Johnson and is the first postmortem biographical work on the author. The first full-length biography was written by John Hawkins and titled Life of Samuel Johnson.

== Background ==
There is little known about the relationship that Johnson and Tyers shared, except that Johnson claimed that "Tyers always tells him something he did not know before" and was familiarly mentioned by Johnson to Johnson's friends. However, Johnson, in The Idler, described Tyers, called Tom Restless, as "a circumstance" and says:

"When Tom Restless rises he goes into a coffee-house, where he creeps so near to men whom he takes to be reasoners, as to hear their discourses and endeavours to remember something which, when it has been strained through Tom's head, is so near to nothing, that what it once was cannot be discovered. This he carries round from friend to friend through a circle of visits, till, hearing what each says upon the question, he becomes able at dinner to say a little himself; and as every great genius relaxes himself among his inferiors, meets with some who wonder how so young a man can talk so wisely."

On 13 December 1784, Samuel Johnson died. In response to his death, the Gentleman's Magazine ran A Biographical Sketch of Dr Samuel Johnson for their December issue. The work was written in the short time between the death and the printing. Although it was the first biographical work on Johnson, the first full-length biography would be published by Murphy in 1787.

== Biography ==
Tyers used his Biographical Sketch to discuss Johnson's mental state, but not everyone agreed with the way Tyers revealed Johnson's private life; Hester Thrale wrote, in her Anecdotes of the Late Samuel Johnson, "Poor Johnson! I see they will leave nothing untold that I laboured so long to keep secret; & I was so very delicate in trying to conceal his fancied Insanity." Regardless of what Thrale may have wanted, critics focused on Johnson's mental state from then after. In particular, John Wain emphasizes Tyers's description of Johnson as "like a ghost. He never speaks unless he is spoken to", which Wain considered a "bon mot". Likewise, Walter Jackson Bate relies on how Tyers was able to partly capture Johnson's "bisociative" ability to bring "together two different frames of experience". Tyers, when saying Johnson "said the most common things in the newest manner", describes Johnson's "unpredictability" and a

"further process of mind in which the original shuffling of perspectives, already surprising us with elements we had overlooked or forgotten, is joined by considerations drawn from other matrices of experience that can only be described as 'moral,' that is, having to do with the condition of man - with human hopes and fears; with values, purpose or aim; with the shared sense, never forgotten, of the 'doom of man'; and with an unsleeping practical urgency in considering concretely what to do and how to live."

Tyers concludes his work by saying:

"At the end of this sketch, it may be hinted (sooner might have been prepossession) that Johnson told this writer, for he saw he always had his eye and ear upon him, that at some time or other he might be called upon to assist a posthumous account of him.

A hint was given to our author, a few years ago, by this Rhapsodist, to write his own life, lest somebody should write it for him. He has reason to believe, he has left a manuscript biography behind him. His executors, all honourable men, will sit in judgment upon his papers. Thuanus, Buchanan, Huetius, and others, have been their own historians.

The memory of some people, says Mably very lately, 'is their understanding.' This may be thought, by some readers, to be the case in point. Whatever anecdotes were furnished by memory, this pen did not choose to part with to any compiler. His little bit of gold he has worked into as much gold-leaf as he could

== Critical response ==
James Boswell, in his Life of Samuel Johnson, wrote:

"[Tyers] abounded in anecdote, but was no sufficiently attentive to accuracy. I therefore cannot venture to avail myself much of a biographical sketch of Johnson which he published, being one among the various persons ambitious of appending their names to that of my illustrious friend. That sketch is, however, an entertaining little collection of fragments."
