= Edmond Barker =

English physician

Edmond Barker (1721–1780?) was an English physician.

== Life ==
His birthplace and parentage are unknown.

He studied medicine at the University of Leyden, whose register is the only authority for his age and nationality. The entry of his matriculation, on 16 September 1743, describes him as an Englishman, aged 22. He took his doctor's degree in 1747, and settled to the practice of his profession in London.

In the winter of 1749, Samuel Johnson established the Ivy Lane Club, which met weekly at a beefsteak house near St Paul's Cathedral; here Barker was introduced by a fellow-student, Samuel Dyer. Sir John Hawkins, in his Life of Johnson, has left character portraits of some of the members of the club; he describes Barker as a dissenter by education, a unitarian by religious profession, and a disciple of Lord Shaftesbury in philosophy. According to the same authority, Barker was an acute reasoner on ethics, a deep metaphysician, an excellent classical scholar, and a student of the Italian poets. He was, however, "a thoughtless young man", so slovenly in his habits, dress, and appearance as to be a jest to his companions; and naturally he "succeeded ill in his profession". In this sketch there is one characteristic detail which may be accepted with a confidence that Hawkins does not always merit. Johnson, we are told, so often snubbed Barker for his unitarianism, that his visits to the club became less and less frequent.

Hawkins continues:

After leaving us (i.e. the Ivy Lane company) he went to practice at Trowbridge, in Wiltshire, but at the end of two years returned to London, and became librarian to the College of Physicians in room of Edwards the ornithologist, and for some misbehaviour was displaced, and died in obscurity.

The third part of Edwards's 'Gleanings of Natural History,’ published in 1764, was translated by Barker from English into French, the work being printed in parallel columns in both languages. The books of the Royal College of Physicians show that he was "library-keeper" to that body from 1760 to 1771; how much longer he held the position—which was one of small emolument, and probably consistent with the exercise of his profession—or for what reason he ceased to hold it, a gap in the college records prevents us from ascertaining. It appears however that by 1781, a successor had been found for him. Boswell knew nothing of Barker at first hand, and it seems almost certain that his intimacy with Johnson was not renewed after his return from Trowbridge. To the sombre sequel of his career as described by Hawkins no other evidence is opposed.
