= Letters Written in France =

Series of letters by Helen Maria Williams

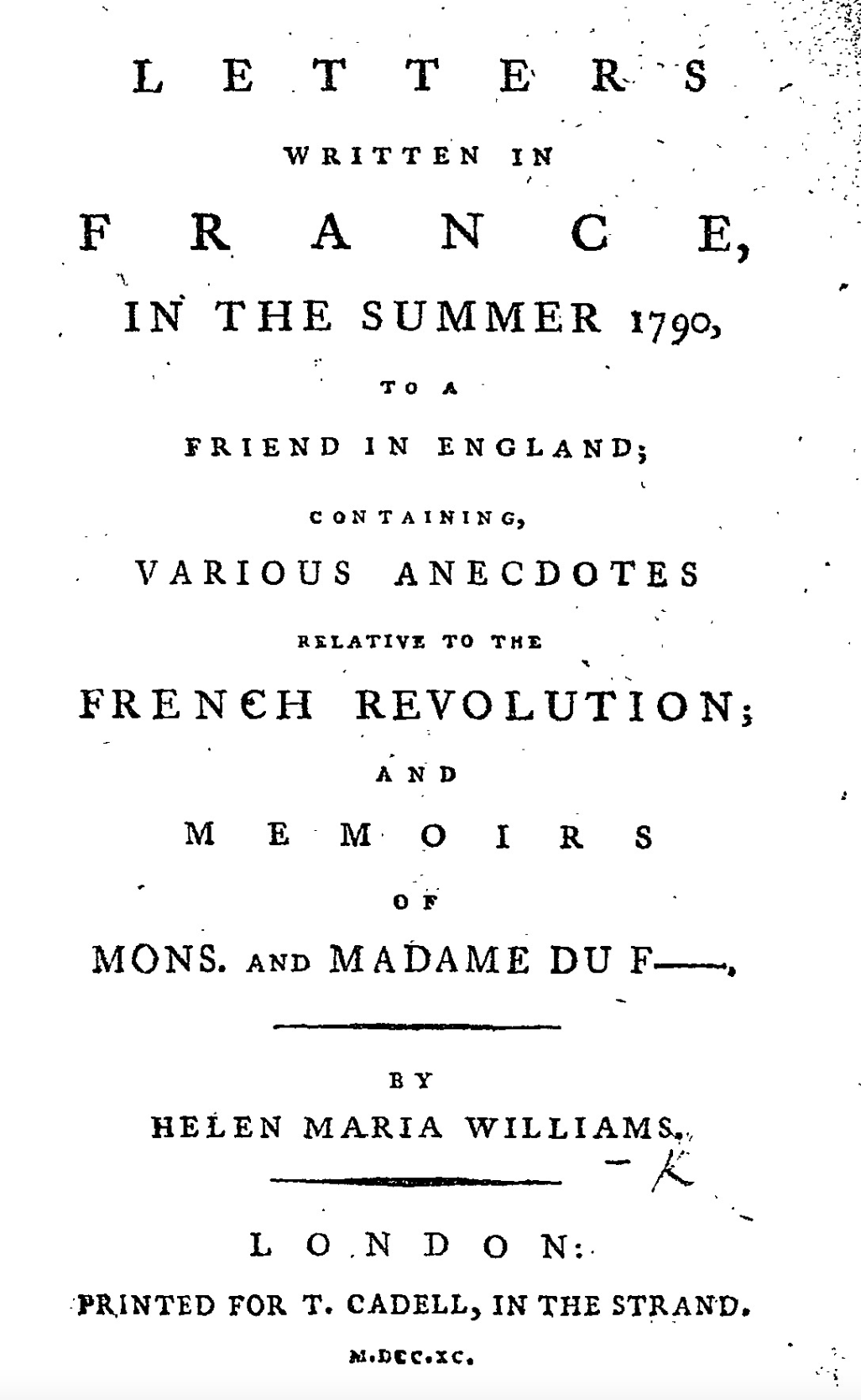
- Title page for the first edition of volume one
- Author: Helen Maria Williams
- Language: English
- Genre: Travel literature, letter collection
- Publisher: T. Cadell, G.G. & J. Robinson
- Publication date: 1790–1796
- Publication place: United Kingdom

Letters Written in France (1790–1796) is a letter collection by English writer Helen Maria Williams. Williams published eight volumes of letters describing her firsthand experience of the French Revolution for British audiences. She witnessed the Fête de la Fédération, the executions of Louis XVI and Marie Antoinette, and much of the Reign of Terror. She was briefly a political prisoner and an exile in Switzerland, but returned to Paris after the execution of Robespierre.

Williams' Letters express consistent confidence in the revolutionary ideals of liberty and equality, even after the development of violence and war in France. Stylistically, the letters are sentimental and familiar, in keeping with the expectations for women's writing at the time. The first volume, describing the summer of 1790, was the most famous and influential. It was well-received as a rebuttal to conservative viewpoints in the contemporaneous public debate known as the Revolution Controversy. Later volumes had more mixed or negative reception, as England was more politically opposed to France.

== Background ==
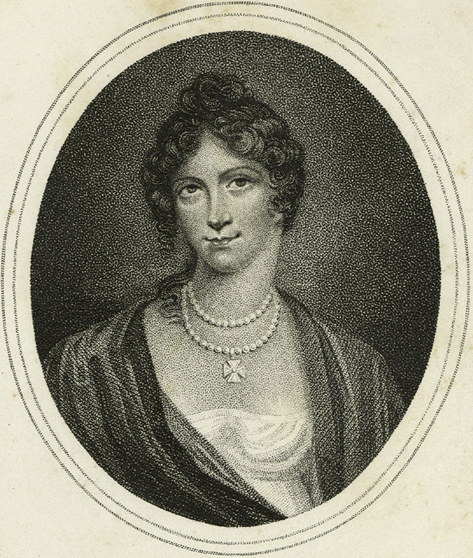
Helen Maria Williams in 1816

Helen Maria Williams was the daughter of a Welsh army officer father and a Scottish woman, raised in England. Her father died when she was two, and her mother and two sisters lived comfortably on the income from his estate and pension. In the 1780s, when she was in her twenties, Williams became a literary celebrity known for her poetry and novels, which used the aesthetics of sensibility to advocate for social reform. She was prominent in the social circles of Dissenters and Whigs, connected to figures like Andrew Kippis, Anna Laetitia Barbauld and William Godwin. She campaigned against the slave trade, and against laws like the Test Act which restricted the civil rights of non-Anglicans.

Sometime in 1785 or 1786, Williams and her sister Cecilia began taking French lessons from Monique du Fossé. Monique and her husband, Augustin du Fossé, lived in exile and poverty in England. Augustin's father, a Baron, disapproved of their marriage and used a lettre de cachet to imprison Augustin; he escaped, and fled to England to avoid re-arrest. His father died in 1787. In 1789, the French Revolution made it safe for the du Fossés to return to France and claim Augustin's inheritance.

Williams and her sister arrived in Paris for a tour of France on 13 July 1790, the day before the first Fête de la Fédération. The two travelled through France for two months, visiting Monique and Augustin du Fossé, and returned to England in September 1790. Williams returned to France in 1791 for a longer stay, which became a permanent move. Her last visit to England was a brief trip in 1792, where she persuaded her mother and sisters to move with her. For this trip, she was accompanied by John Hurford Stone, a married man whose relationship to Williams attracted comment; Stone became a permanent member of the Williams' household in France. In Paris, her apartment became a social hub for radical thinkers from America, Britain, and France, and Williams was associated with the Girondins.

During the Reign of Terror, all British nationals became subject to arrest and the confiscation of their property. Williams was arrested on 12 October 1793, along with her mother and sisters. They were imprisoned, until a nephew of Monique du Fossé arranged their release in November. Many of Williams' close friends in France were executed for opposition to the Jacobins. In April 1794, Robespierre ordered all foreigners to leave the capital; Williams fled to Switzerland for six months. She returned after Robespierre's execution. Williams was naturalized as a French citizen in 1817, and remained a politically-active writer in France until her death in 1827.

== Contents ==
Williams' letters describe her firsthand experience of events in France from 1790 to 1796. Her discussion of French social reform was unflaggingly optimistic, expressing her faith in the ideals of liberty and equality and her excitement that these principles could eliminate tyranny around the world. She expressed frequent hopes that England would be inspired to social reform, and especially that slavery would be abolished. Early on, these hopes were shared by other English writers, but after a series of massacres within France, and wars between France and other nations, Williams became unusual for remaining committed to revolutionary ideals. She never endorsed violence, rather seeing it as a perversion of revolutionary ideals, often attributable to Robespierre's hypocrisy and corruption.

=== Volume one ===
The first volume was published by T. Cadell in 1790 with the full title of Letters written in France, in the summer 1790, to a friend in England; containing various anecdotes relative to the French revolution; and memoirs of Mons. and Madame du F----. The twenty-six letters cover Williams' visits to various locations associated with the Revolution, a history of the du Fossé family, and her own personal views alongside sociological observations. The first volume can be roughly divided into three unequal parts:

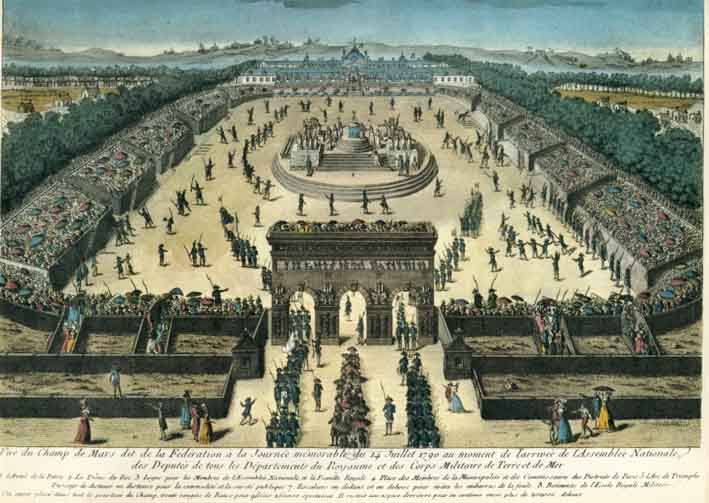
The Fête de la Fédération, on the eve of which the Letters begins. (Musée de la Révolution française)

- Letters I–XV: Williams' narrative begins at a mass at Notre-Dame de Paris on the eve of the Fête de la Fédération, a celebration to commemorate the first anniversary of the Storming of the Bastille. From here the letters describe figures of the Revolution; they also chart her visits to sites that include the ruins of the Bastille, the National Assembly and the Palace of Versailles. It finishes several weeks later with a journey from Paris to Rouen.
- Letter XVI–XXII: Williams offers the history of the du Fossé family. It chronicles the younger du Fossé's decision to go against the will of his father in his choice of whom to marry, and the various abuses he suffers as he tries to escape his strict control.
- Letters XXIII–XXVI: The narrative returns to the eyewitness epistolary form with a focus on England, to which Williams prepares to return, and then does.

=== Volumes two through eight ===
The subsequent volumes, published by G.G. & J. Robinson, continued to report on Williams' experience in France through the year 1796. Occasionally, these letters re-describe and elaborate on important events in order to counter misrepresentations that circulated in England.

- 1792: Letters from France: Containing Many New Anecdotes Relative to the French Revolution, and the Present State of French Manners contains twenty-four letters from September 1791 to early 1792. Despite hints of discord, Williams maintains an optimistic tone and reassures readers that there is little risk of civil disorder.
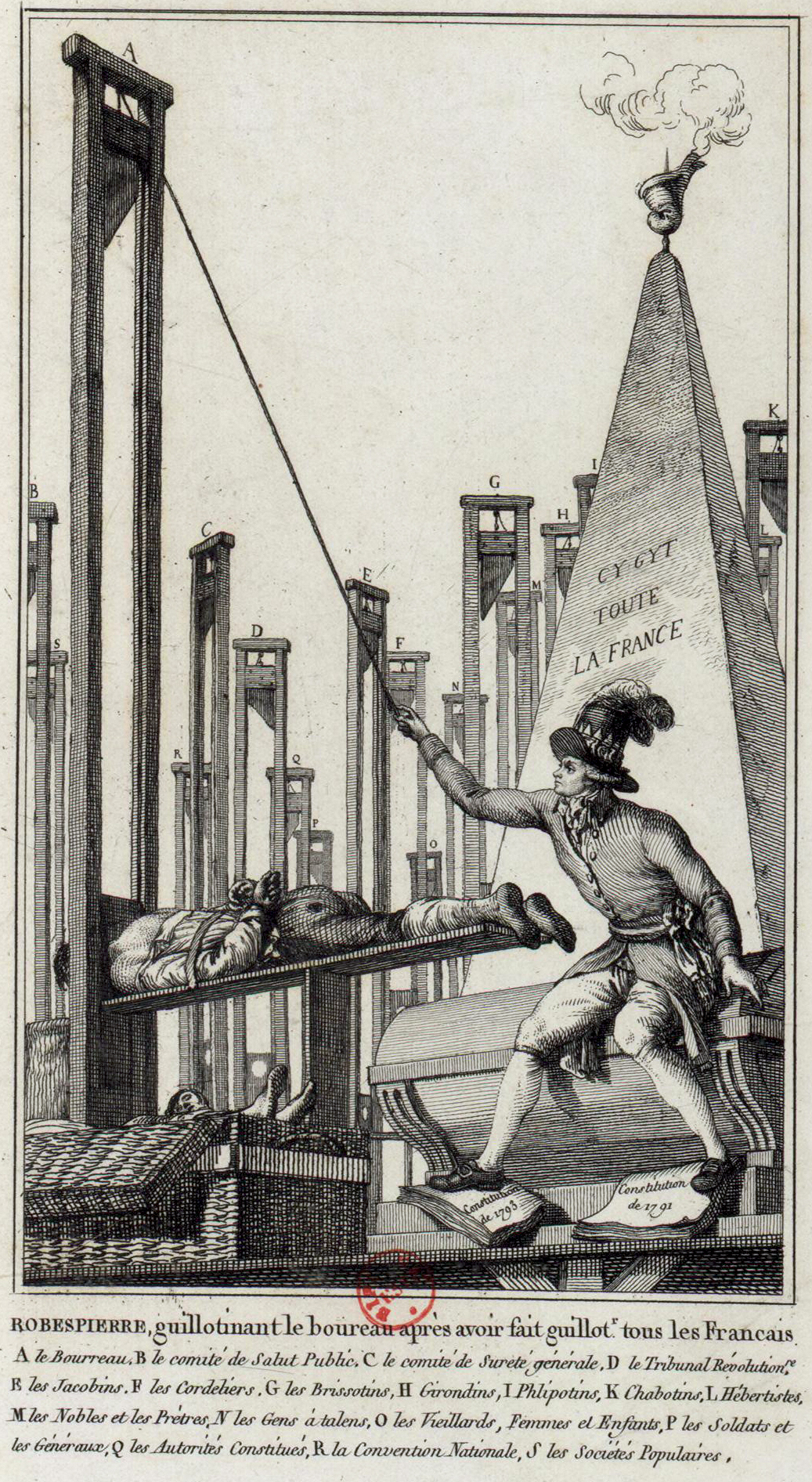
  Cartoon from 1794 showing Robespierre guillotining the executioner after having guillotined everyone else in France. Williams consistently blamed Robespierre for corrupting French revolutionary ideals with violence.
- 1793: Letters from France: Containing a Great Variety of Interesting and Original Information Concerning the Most Important Events that Have Lately Occurred in that Country, and Particularly Respecting the Campaign of 1792 was published in two volumes. It was published without direct attribution to Williams, though it was expected that readers would recognize them as hers.
  - Volume one contains seven letters and an appendix. Only the first letter, written after the execution of Louis XVI in January 1793, is by Williams. The other six are by her partner John Hurford Stone. The volume describes events from 10 August 1792 to January 1793. Williams condemns recent massacres and insists that anarchy will not last, and that the greater ideals of the revolution will still triumph.
  - Volume two contains five letters from February to May 1793. The fifth letter is by Thomas Christie. The letters describe the execution of Louis XVI in more detail, and France's ongoing wars, but reiterate Williams' hope that revolutionary ideals will eventually overcome the violence. Although Williams witnessed the storming of the Tuileries, she does not describe it in her letters.
- 1795: Letters Containing a Sketch of the Politics of France, from the Thirty-first of May 1793, till the Twenty-eighth of July 1794, and of the Scenes which have Passed in the Prisons of Paris was published in two volumes.
  - Volume one contains nine letters and three appendices, some written while Williams is a political prisoner, and some written from Switzerland. She describes the assassination of Jean-Paul Marat and the executions of Charlotte Corday and Marie Antoinette. The execution of Robespierre reinvigorates Williams' optimism that liberty will triumph in France.
  - Volume two contains seven letters and three appendices. Williams describes the executions of Jacques Hébert, Georges Danton, and Camille Desmoulins, and the insincerity of the Festival of the Supreme Being. She is briefly confined as a political prisoner. She concludes, with continuing optimism, that the revolution is exiting a dark period.
- 1796: Letters Containing a Sketch of the Scenes which Passed in Various Departments of France during the Tyranny of Robespierre, and of the Events which Took Place in Paris on the 28th of July 1794 consists of seven letters re-describing events from 1794, including the execution of Danton and her exile from France. Williams attributes all of the horrors of then-recent events to Robespierre, without whom, she suggested, the revolution could subsequently flourish.
- 1796: Letters Containing a Sketch of the Politics of France, from the Twenty-eighth of July 1794, to the Establishment of the Constitution in 1795, and of the Scenes which have Passed in the Prisons of Paris contains nine letters describing events from the fall of Robespierre to the rise of the Directory. Williams describes ongoing internal conflicts, placing her own hopes in the French army.

== Style ==
Williams's writing promotes sensibility over rationality. Her tone is intimate, and focuses on her personal emotional connection to political events. She has been increasingly interpreted as a Romantic writer, whose letters combine aesthetics and politics. Unlike some Romantic poets, Williams does not seek to transcend history, but to shape an emotional response to it. She uses emotional stories and poetic images, especially images of nature and light, to inspire strong feelings of political sympathy for social equality. She presents the revolution itself as a spectacle that unites the usually-opposed aesthetic categories of the sublime and the beautiful by making the awe-inspiring events open to participation from their viewers.

Letter collections were a popular literary genre in the late eighteenth century, and considered particularly suitable to women. Mary Wortley Montagu's Turkish Embassy Letters (1763), for example, exemplified the expected combination of anecdotes, reflection, and elegant prose. Typically, in travel narratives, the letters themselves were not mailed to a real recipient, but written directly for publication in an epistolary style. Fulfilling these expectations, Williams's letter-writing persona is presented as a feminine and naïve sentimental heroine, who can convey political information unthreateningly because she is a passive observer. She addresses the reader familiarly as "you" and "friend". The epistolary form allows Williams to structure her history as individual anecdotes and descriptions, and allows any omissions to seem like a natural result of her personal experience. Unlike other travel writers, Williams does not say much about her lodging or food, instead emphasizing important events and focusing on a historical narrative.

== Publication and reception ==
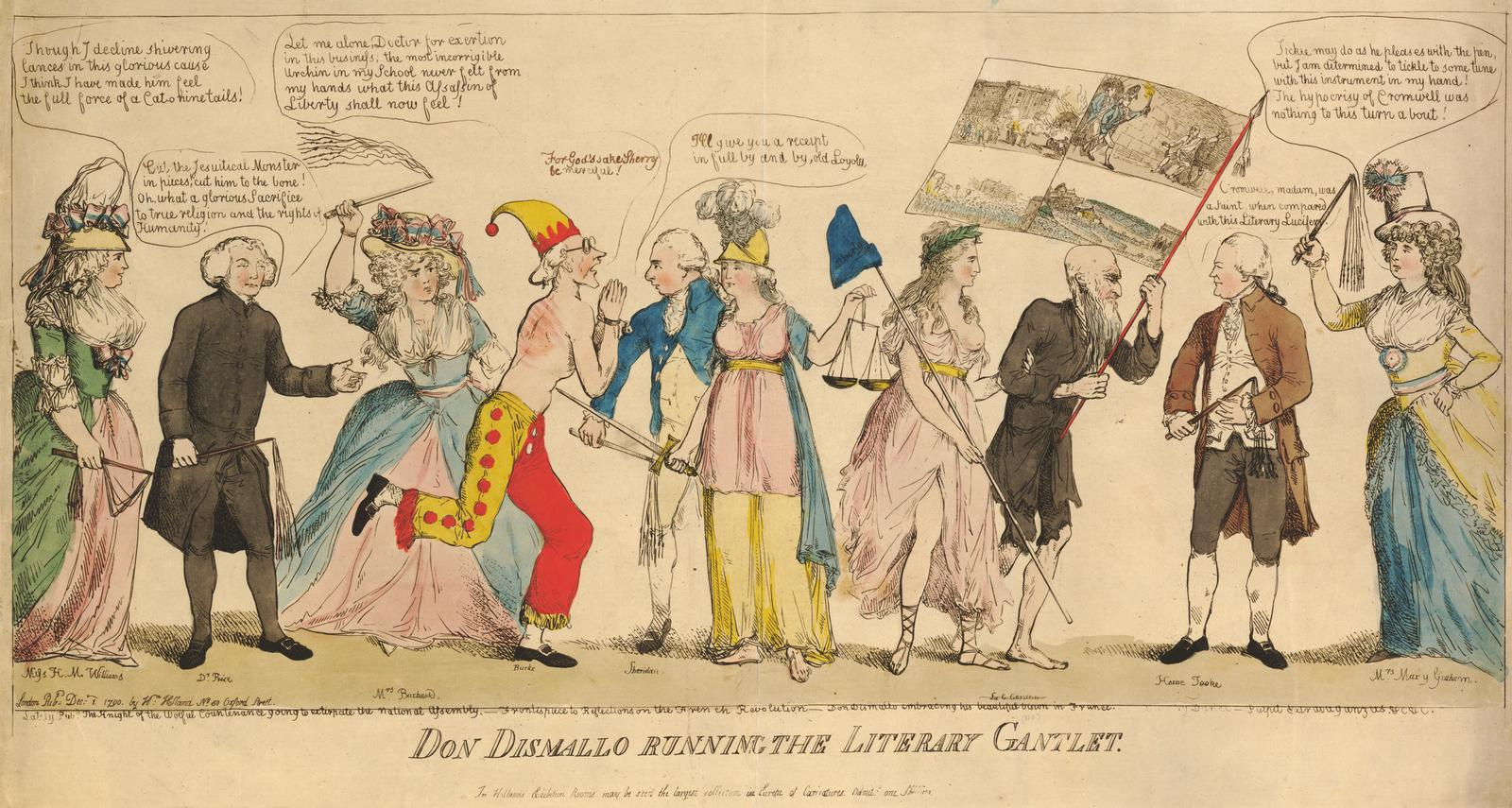
A political cartoon satirizing Edmund Burke for the criticism his conservative Reflections on the Revolution in France received. Williams is depicted on the far left, saying "Though I decline shivering lances in this glorious cause I think I made him feel the full force of a Cat-o-nine tails!"; her Letters did not mention him directly but clearly opposed his opinions.

=== First volume ===
The first volume of Williams' letters was well received in 1790. It was reviewed favourably in most major periodicals. Williams' pro-French sentiment was often noted, but not challenged; both her factual claims about the events of the Revolution and her political perspective were acceptable within English political discourse. Her letters were published two weeks after Edmund Burke's famous Reflections on the Revolution in France, which spurred a pamphlet war that came to be known as the Revolution Controversy. Although Williams was not responding directly to Burke— she completed her manuscript before his work was published— her Letters were seen as a rebuttal to his fearmongering. A poem by Edward Jerningham directly contrasted Williams and Burke in a "battle of the sexes", with Williams as the victor. Williams' letters were widely read and cited during these debates, especially for their value as detailed eyewitness accounts. Three foreign editions were published in 1791: one in Dublin, one in America, and a French translation published in Paris. The primary London edition was reprinted four times between 1790 and 1796. The letters circulated in magazines, including many pirated copies and an authorized reprint in the European Magazine in December 1790.

=== Volumes two through eight ===
Williams' reputation gradually waned after 1790, as British sentiment became more strongly opposed to the revolution. In 1791, her last year in England, she was still popular enough to host literary salons, and reviews in all journals were polite about partial political disagreements. However, there were some tensions with her personal acquaintances (particularly Hester Thrale Piozzi) when she returned briefly in 1792, and the second volume of Letters published in 1792 met with a lukewarm reception. Critics expressed the prevailing British view that social progress in France had been obtained at too high a cost, and suggested that Williams' emotion — previously a sign of her elevated sensibility — was now clouding her judgement.

The September Massacres in 1792, and the execution of Louis XVI in January 1793, firmly ended British support for the revolution and heightened political tensions within France, rendering further publication of Williams' work risky. To avoid arrest in France for her criticisms of the Jacobins, in 1793 Williams published the next two volumes of Letters anonymously. Her authorship was an open secret, and she was explicitly identified by reviewers, as were the two men who contributed additional letters to one of these volumes. These volumes were not warmly received. Williams' political positions were seen as too extreme in England, even as she was endangered for being too moderate in France. Williams was the subject of a book-length rebuttal by Laetitia Matilda Hawkins. In Hawkins' Letters on the Female Mind, Its Powers and Pursuits. Addressed to Miss H. M. Williams, with Particular Reference to Her Letters from France (1793), Hawkins argued that women were unfit for politics, and that poetry was a more appropriate sphere for the expression of sensibility.

The next four volumes were written and published as a set, the first two appearing in 1795 and the last two in 1796. These volumes were widely reviewed, with a polarized response: in England, liberal journals regarded them positively, while conservative journals used the Letters to denounce the revolution itself. This series, which attempted to retroactively capture the Reign of Terror, was also criticized for being disorganized and haphazard in its inclusion of documents, the epistolary mode conflicting with the book's historical scope.

=== Later reception ===
By the end of the 1790s, Williams's reputation in England had declined substantially. The formerly-popular literary genre of sensibility which was key to her writing was now seen as socially dangerous, and the epistolary form was going out of fashion. Williams herself was seen as politically extreme, as well as sexually immoral due to her extramarital relationship with John Hurford Stone. In 1798, an anonymous detractor in the Anti-Jacobin Review said her writing displayed "a contempt of truth, decency, and decorum, which constitutes the general characteristic of a female mind infected with the poison of democracy". An 1801 satirical poem titled "The Vision of Liberty" caricatured Williams as the archetype for Lechery. When she died in 1827, her obituary in the Monthly Review declared that her Letters were already forgotten.

A hundred years later, the French scholar Lionel Woodward wrote a biography of Williams, which brought some attention to her and her letters. However, Williams was now dismissed as an untrustworthy eyewitness with no real understanding of politics; historians dismissed the Letters as unreliable. The more recent literary scholar Louise Duckling argues that these twentieth-century critics accepted at face-value Williams's strategic narrative persona of passive femininity, and overlooked the seriousness of her writing. In the twenty-first century, the study of Romanticism became more interested in women's writing from the period, and less interested in policing conventional sexual morality. Scholars now consider Williams an important Romantic writer, and her Letters are seen as a valuable historical record of the French Revolution.
