= John Sidney Hawkins =

John Sidney Hawkins (baptised 11 February 1758 – 12 August 1842) was an English antiquarian. Considered reclusive, he is known largely for his publications.

== Life ==
He was the eldest son of Sir John Hawkins and his wife Sidney Storer; the writer Laetitia-Matilda Hawkins was his sister.

While living in Westminster, Hawkins used to accompany his father to Westminster Abbey to hear the music and study the architecture. He died on 12 August 1842, aged 84, at Lower Grove, Brompton, London, where he had long resided. He was a Fellow of the Society of Antiquaries of London. His various collections were sold in London at auction by Fletcher in 1843; the library on 8 May and eight following days, the music and musical instruments on 29 May and following day, and the pictures, prints and drawings on 8 June 1843 and two following days. Copies of all three catalogues are held at Cambridge University Library (shelfmarks Munby.c.156(11-13)). He was described in the Gentleman's Magazine's obituary as a learned antiquary, whose "talents were overshadowed by a sour and jealous temper," and who in later life was in retirement.

== Works ==
An early work comprised essays on plates from subjects in Westminster Abbey, published in 1782–3 in John Carter's Antient Sculpture and Painting. The extent of his assistance was later a matter of dispute between him and Carter. On the discovery of paintings on the walls of the old House of Commons in 1800, Hawkins set out to write an account of them, to accompany the drawings made by John Thomas Smith; but Smith completed and published the work himself in 1807 as Antiquities of Westminster. Hawkins published A Correct Statement of his share of the work, London, 1807, and Smith issued A Reply, London, 1808. During 1814 Hawkins engaged in a dispute with Isaac D'Israeli in vindication of his father.

Hawkins also published:

- An edition of George Ruggle's Ignoramus, with notes, London, 1787.
- Walton's Complete Angler, 1797, 1808, a reproduction of his father's edition).
- L. Da Vinci's Treatise on Painting in John Francis Rigaud's translation, with a life, 1802.
- A History of the Origin and Establishment of Gothic Architecture, London, 1813 criticised by John Carter in the Gentleman's Magazine.
- An Inquiry into … Greek and Latin Poetry (especially dramatic), London, 1817.
- An Inquiry into the nature … of Thorough Bass on a new plan, London [1817].

== Family ==
Hawkins married Emily. They had a son John Sidney, baptised 1817, and a daughter Emily Louisa, baptised 1826.
