= Jean Jacob =

Jean Jacob may refer to:

- Jean Claude Jacob, serf from the Jura Mountains, supposedly 120 years old
- Jean Paul Jacob (died 2019), Brazilian electronic engineer, researcher and professor
