= John Jones (engraver) =

British engraver

John Jones (c.1755–1797) was a British printmaker.

== Life ==
John practised both mezzotint and stipple engraving styles. He lived in Great Portland Street, London from 1783. In 1790 he was appointed engraver extraordinary to the Prince of Wales, and he was also principal engraver to the Duke of York. George Jones, R.A., was his only son.

== Works ==
Jones produced a large number of plates, chiefly from portraits by Joshua Reynolds, George Romney, and other contemporary painters; these, with few exceptions, he published himself. He exhibited with the Incorporated Society of Artists from 1775 to 1791.

Jones's mezzotints included portraits of:

- Signora Baccelli the dancer, and Richard Warren, M.D., after Thomas Gainsborough;
- James Balfour (the golfer) and William Tytler, after Henry Raeburn;
- John Barker, James Boswell, George James Cholmondeley, Charles James Fox, Lord Hood, Fanny Kemble, William Pitt, and Anna Maria Tollemache, after Reynolds;
- Ynyr Burges, Edmund Burke, and the Duke and Duchess of Marlborough, after Romney; and
- William Thomas Lewis as the Marquis in the Midnight Hour (adapted by Elizabeth Inchbald from the French original), after Martin Archer Shee;

also the "Blenheim Theatricals", after James Roberts, and some figure-subjects after George Carter, William Redmore Bigg, Henry Fuseli, and others. He also engraved drawings by Henry Bunbury.

Among Jones's stipple plates were:

- Elizabeth Farren and Thomas King as Sir Peter and Lady Teazle, after John Downman;
- Serena, after Romney;
- Robinetta, Muscipula, the Fortune Teller, and portrait of the Duke of York, after Reynolds.

The print of Reynolds's View from Richmond Hill, the proofs of which are dated 1796, was published by Jones's widow in 1800.

== Notes ==
Attribution

This article incorporates text from a publication now in the public domain: Lee, Sidney, ed. (1892). "Jones, John (1745?-1797)". Dictionary of National Biography. Vol. 30. London: Smith, Elder & Co.
