= John Hurford Stone =

British radical political reformer and publisher

John Hurford Stone (1763–1818) was a British radical political reformer and publisher who spent much of his life in France.

Stone was born in Taunton, Somerset. After the death of his father, he went to live with his uncle, William Hurford, who was a coal merchant, in London. Together with his younger brother, William, he took over his uncle's business upon his death.

Stone became friends with Joseph Priestley as a member of Richard Price's church in Hackney; these associations also radicalized him. He was a member of the London Revolution Society and in February 1792 he offered to help Talleyrand secure British neutrality in the European wars involving France. He and his wife moved to Paris in April to open a sal ammoniac factory and established himself as part of the British expatriate community, including Helen Maria Williams with whom he had a subsequent long love affair. Stone published his opinions on the 1792 military campaigns as part of Williams' Letters Written in France in 1793. Stone, while saddened by the September Massacres, believed they were necessary for the revolutionary to succeed and he and other expatriates celebrated French military victories. In addition to his factory, Stone established a printing house, Imprimerie Anglaise, which printed Joel Barlow's epic, The Vision of Columbus.

Like many other Britons living in France at the time, Stone and his wife were arrested after the decree of 9 October 1793, but they were released on 30 October. During the Reign of Terror, Stone paid 12,000 francs to help Stéphanie de Genlis's husband escape from prison, but she later refused to pay this debt back. In April 1794 Stone was denounced as agent of William Pitt and he and his wife were arrested again, but let go on the condition that they leave the country. They fled to Switzerland, where Helen Maria Williams was staying. In June, he was allowed back into France to obtain a divorce. Throughout these troubled years, Stone continued to write openly to his brother William, who was tried for treason (unsuccessfully) in January 1796 on the basis of the letters. Their contents made a return to Britain impossible for Stone. After the terror, Stone and Williams returned to Paris together. In 1798, William Cobbett published letters Stone had written to Priestley, forcing Priestley to denounce his friend's statements.

Stone's printing business published works by Thomas Paine, Thomas Jefferson, and Constantin Volney, among other. He was bankrupted in 1812 by the high cost of printing the 30-volume Voyage de Humboldt et de Bonpland.

Stone died in 1818 and was buried in Paris' Père Lachaise Cemetery.
