= John Thomas Smith (engraver) =

English artist and antiquarian

John Smith
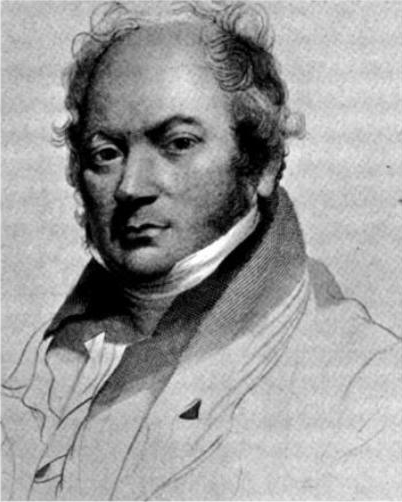
- Smith by William Skelton
- Born: 23 June 1766; London, England, Kingdom of Great Britain
- Died: 8 March 1833 (aged 66); London, England, British Empire
- Other name: "Antiquity" Smith
- Education: included the Royal Academy
- Occupations: Engraver, draughtsman, curator
- Employer: British Museum
- Spouse: Anna Maria (Prickett)
- Children: 1 son and daughter
- Parent: Nathaniel Smith

John Thomas Smith, also known as Antiquity Smith (23 June 1766 – 8 March 1833), was an English painter, engraver and antiquarian. He wrote a life of the sculptor Joseph Nollekens, that was noted for its "malicious candour", and was a keeper of prints for the British Museum.

== Biography ==
John Thomas Smith was born in the back of a Hackney carriage on 23 June 1766. His mother was returning home to 7 Great Portland Street. He was named John for his grandfather and Thomas after his great uncle, Admiral Thomas Smith. His father Nathaniel Smith was at that time a sculptor working for Joseph Nollekens, but later became a printseller.

John Thomas Smith first tried to train as a sculptor with Nollekens, but left to study with John Keyse Sherwin and at the Royal Academy. After three years he left to live off his drawing skills. He gave up his topographical drawing and acting ambitions to compile Antiquities of London and its Environs which was later described as his favourite work. Smith became known as "Antiquity Smith".

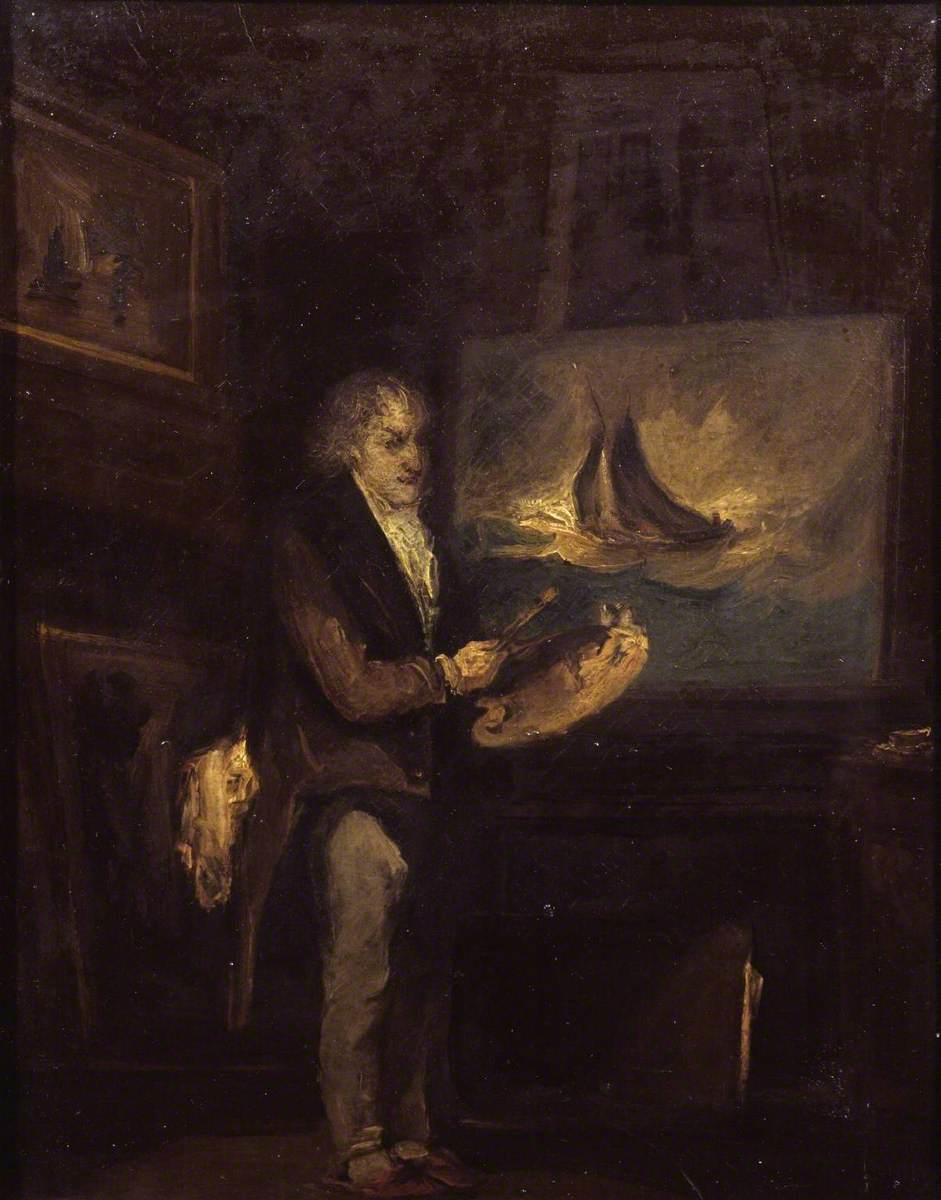
Smith's portrait of the painter J. M. W. Turner

In 1796, the young John Constable was introduced to Smith, and he became Constable's informal artistic mentor.

Smith published books of engravings and worked as a drawing master in Edmonton. In 1807, he published Antiquities of Westminster which has been described as his major work. The work had been inspired by paintings found during extension work to the Houses of Parliament on 11 August 1800. Smith and Charles Gower were invited to see the pictures, and Smith was able to obtain permission to sketch them. He had to work early in the morning to avoid the workmen. It is said that they frequently demolished what he had just finished sketching and he kept this work up constantly for six weeks. After this his permission was transferred to an artist from the Society of Antiquaries, but Smith had a complete record by that time. The published book contained over a hundred drawings of antiquities in Westminster that were no longer standing.

Smith had a very public row between 1807 and 1809 following a failed partnership with John Hawkins. They had planned to work together on a book, with illustrations by Smith and an accompanying text by Hawkins. However the partners fell out and Hawkins went on to publish the book alone; he included an explanation of Smith's absence. Smith published a reply and this was followed by a refutation by Hawkins. Finally 62 additional pictures were published separately after the publication.

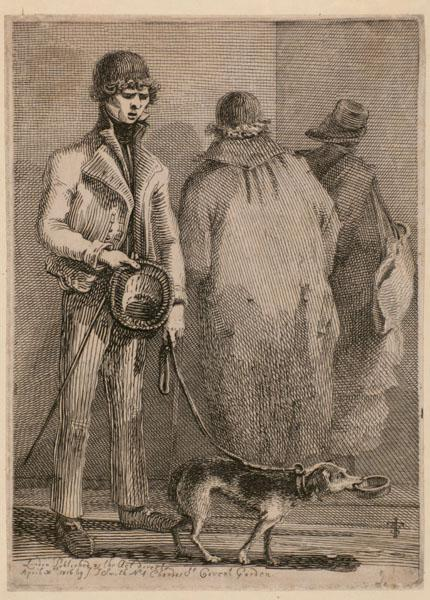
An engraving of a blind beggar by Smith

Between 1810 and 1815, Smith created drawings and engravings of notable beggars in London and published The Streets of London: Anecdotes of Their More Celebrated Residents.

Smith was offered the position of Keeper of the Prints department of the British Museum in September 1816 The position still allowed Smith to sketch and draw. His next publication, Vagabondiana, or Anecdotes of Mendicant Wanderers through the Streets of London, had an introduction by Francis Douce, who had at one time also worked for the British Museum. Douce, Sir William Beechey and Smith were the executors of Joseph Nollekens' will, and it said that Smith was disappointed by the small legacy he received. His next book was a candid biography called Nollekens and His Times. This book was said to be notable for its "malicious candour and vivid detail". The unkind portrait of Nollekens was also accompanied by short biographies of other leading figures that were better received and are a valuable source for art historians. His biography of William Blake was the basis of later biographies as his was one of the first and was drawn from first hand experience as after he met Blake they never lost contact.

Smith died from inflammation of the lungs on 8 March 1833 at his home at 22 University Street, off Tottenham Court Road. He left Anna Maria (born Prickett) – whom he had married 45 years previously – unprovided for, and also an adult son and daughter. He was privately interred on 16 March in the burial grounds of St George's Chapel, near Tyburn turnpike.

In the years following Smith's demise, his executors issued three posthumous works: Cries of London in 1839, edited by John Nichols, Book for a Rainy Day and Antiquarian Ramble in the Streets of London in 1846, edited by Charles Mackay.

== Rule of thirds ==
Smith's 1797 work Remarks on Rural Scenery contains what appears to be the earliest reference to the compositional "rule of thirds".

== Works include ==
- Remarks on Rural Scenery, 1797
- Antiquities of Westminster, 1807
- The Streets of London: Anecdotes of Their More Celebrated Residents, 1815
- Vagabondiana, or Anecdotes of Mendicant Wanderers through the Streets of London, 1817
- Nollekens and his Times. 2 volumes 1828

Posthumous:

- Cries of London (ed. John Bowyer Nichols, 1839)
- Antiquarian Ramble in the Streets of London (ed., Charles Mackay, 1846)
- A Book for a Rainy Day: or, Recollections of the Events of The Last Sixty-Six Years, 1905
