= Christopher Nugent (physician) =

Irish physician (1698–1775)

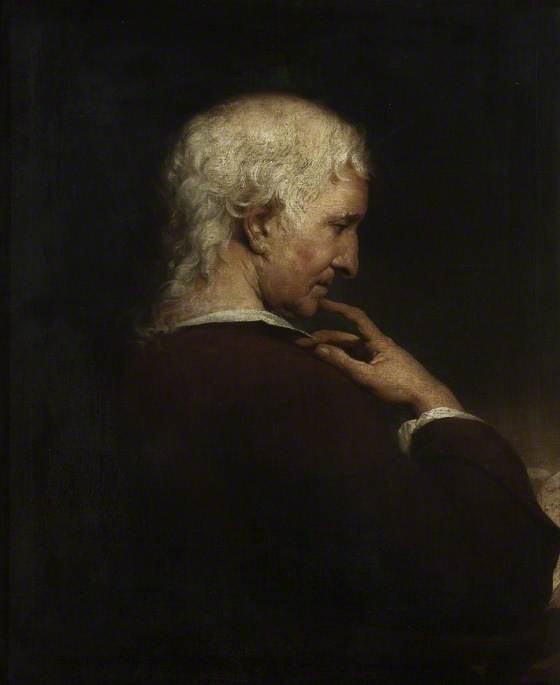
Christopher Nugent, portrait by James Barry

Christopher Nugent (1698–1775) was an Irish physician in London. He was a founding member of The Club, Samuel Johnson's dining circle.

== Life ==
Nugent was born in Ireland and, after graduating M.D. in France, went into practice. He worked first in the south of Ireland, and then at Bath, where he had success.

Early in 1764 Nugent moved to London. He lived first in Queen Anne Street, and later in Suffolk Street, off The Strand. On 25 June 1765 he was admitted a licentiate of the College of Physicians of London, and in the same year he was elected a Fellow of the Royal Society.

Nugent died on 12 October 1775. It has been argued that the writer Thomas Nugent was his brother.

== Works ==
In 1753 Nugent published in London An Essay on the Hydrophobia. The book begins with an account of a successful treatment by him in June 1751 of a servant-maid who had been bitten by a mad turnspit dog in two places, and had rabies. He treated her mainly by powders of musk and cinnabar. Later sections discuss the mental and physical aspects of the disease, its resemblances to hysteria, and some proposed remedies.

== Family ==
Nugent married a Miss Leake, and they had a son and daughter. The wife was a Presbyterian; he himself a Catholic. Edmund Burke was his patient around 1750; and married his daughter Jane Mary, brought up a Catholic, early in 1757. Burke called his younger son Christopher, after his father-in-law.

The son, John Nugent (1737–1813), left six sons and two daughters. His first wife was Elizabeth Hargrave, who died in 1779, the widow of Major Richard Hargrave. Hargrave was the brother of Christopher Hargrave (c.1710–1787), a chancery solicitor, and so uncle of Francis Hargrave the legal writer. Nugent spent some time in America. He married again, his second wife Lucy (1762–1826) being the daughter of Garrett Nagle of Ballyduff. They were married on 12 May 1786 in Saint Fin Barre's Cathedral, Cork, Ireland.

A Barbados estate, Boarded Hall, arising as a legacy from Sir Edmund Nagle who died in 1830, came partially under the control of John Nugent's eldest son Christopher Richard Nugent. The other main executor was Garrett Nagle of Ballynamona, County Cork, representing another branch of the Nagles. Edmund Nagle (died young in 1763) the father of Sir Edmund Nagle, Garrett Nagle of Ballyduff and Elizabeth Nagle who married in 1754 Garrett Nagle of Ballinamona, were three children of Patrick Nagle and his wife Ellen O'Donovan. Sir Edmund left a wife and a sister, both called Mary. The two executors were descendants respectively of Garrett Nagle of Ballyduff, and of Garrett Nagle of Ballinamona, not closely related by blood as a grandson of Garrett Nagle of Clogher. The senior of the Ballynamona side at the time was presumably Garrett Nagle (born 1776).

Christopher Richard Nugent married in 1818 Catherine Elizabeth Nash, daughter of the merchant Thomas Nash. He sailed to Valparaíso in 1823, appointed by George Canning in 1823 the first consul-general to Chile, with Henry William Rouse and Matthew Carter. His brother Thomas died unmarried. Of six daughters:

- Jane married Richard Barnewall
- Catherine married St. Leger Hill, an army officer
- Mary married Isaac Wood, Archdeacon of Chester
- Margaret married James Hill, son of James Hill of Graig, Co. Cork.
- Elizabeth and Lucy were unmarried.

The Hills were relations of the Nagles, Arundel Hill (1739–1820) having married Helen, daughter of Garrett Nagle of Fountainville and Ballyduff, in 1777 as his second wife. James Hill of Graig, and St. Leger Hill, were respectively the third and fourth sons of Arundel Hill. After Margaret died, James Hill remarried to Elizabeth, daughter of Charles Dean Oliver.

== Associations ==
Nugent was one of the nine original members of Dr. Johnson's literary club. He was regular in his attendance, and was present when James Boswell was admitted. In the imaginary college at St. Andrews, discussed with Johnson, he was to be professor of physic. As a Catholic, he had an omelette on Friday at the club dinner; one club day after Nugent's death Johnson exclaimed, "Ah! my poor friend, I shall never eat omelette with thee again." Benjamin Hoadley was one of his medical friends.

== Notes ==
Attribution

- This article incorporates text from a publication now in the public domain: Lee, Sidney, ed. (1895). "Nugent, Christopher (d.1775)". Dictionary of National Biography. Vol. 41. London: Smith, Elder & Co.
