= Jonathan Tyers =

Proprietor of Vauxhall Gardens in London (1702–1767)

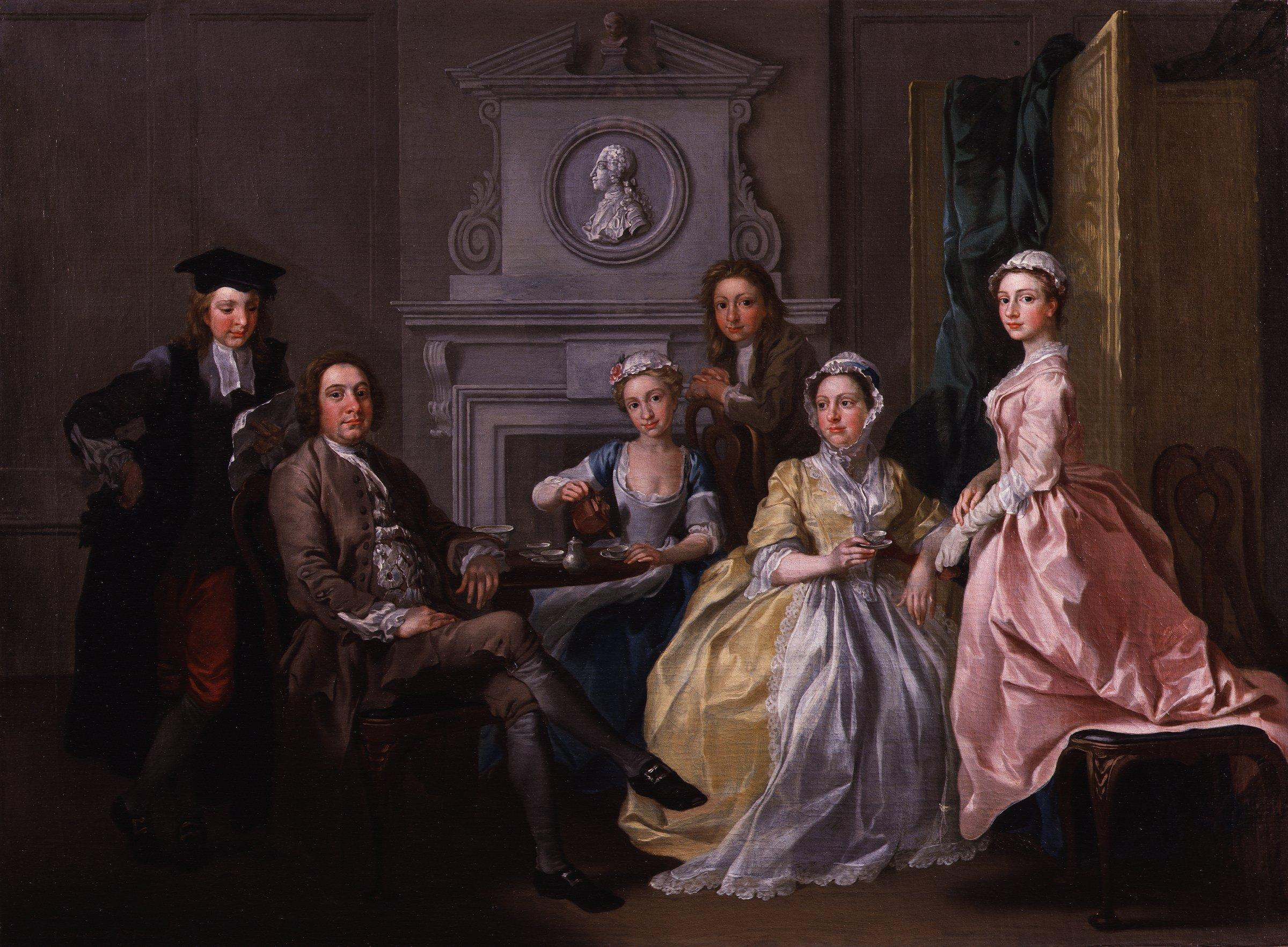
Jonathan Tyers and his family, by Francis Hayman, c. 1740

Jonathan Tyers (10 April 1702 – 1767) was the proprietor of New Spring Gardens, later known as Vauxhall Gardens, a popular pleasure garden in Kennington, London. Opened in 1661, it was situated on the south bank of the River Thames on a site almost opposite the present-day Tate Britain.

In 1728, Tyers signed a thirty-year lease of the land on which New Spring Gardens was sited. At that time it was little more than a rural brothel, and Tyers set himself the task of transforming the gardens into a family-friendly venue by installing lights and commissioning new entertainments. But with one eye on his profits, he left some areas unlit, to allow sex workers to continue plying their trade.

Tyers set out a quite different style of garden at his weekend home of Denbies, near Dorking in Surrey. In contrast to the merriment of Vauxhall Gardens, The Valley of the Shadow of Death, as the garden at Denbies was known, was designed as a reminder of man's mortality. Tyers died at his home in Vauxhall Gardens in 1767, and his sons Thomas and Jonathan became joint proprietors of the pleasure garden.

== Life ==
Jonathan Tyers was born on 10 April 1702, probably in Bermondsey, Surrey, and was the son of Thomas Tyers, a wool-stapler, and his wife, Ann. Jonathan married Elizabeth Fermor (1700–1771) some time in the early 1720s, and together they had four children: Margaret (1724–1786), Thomas (1724/5–1787), Jonathan, and Elizabeth (1727–1802).

Prior to Tyers securing a thirty-year lease of New Spring Gardens from Elizabeth Masters in 1728, little else is known about his early life, except that he had worked in Bermondsey trading skins for the fellmongering company owned by his family. According to the scholar John Lockman, when Tyers leased the gardens – for an annual payment of £250 (equivalent to £43,000 in 2023) (Note: UK Retail Price Index inflation figures are based on data from Clark, Gregory (2017), "The Annual RPI and Average Earnings for Britain, 1209 to Present (New Series)", MeasuringWorth) – the venue was little more than a "much frequented rural brothel". Under Tyers' management, and later ownership, (Note: Tyers became the owner of the Gardens in 1758.) however, the gardens gradually gained a degree of respectability..

== Vauxhall Gardens ==
The first major event Tyers organised at the gardens was on 7 June 1732. Styled as a Ridotto al Fresco – a ridotto in Italy was a fancy-dress ball held outside – 400 visitors paid the one guinea entrance charge. Frederick, Prince of Wales, who owned the land the gardens were on, was among the paying visitors. The entertainment on offer was advertised as scenes portraying pieces entitled "The House of Ambition", "The House of Avarice", "The House of Bacchus", "The House of Lust" and "The Palace of Pleasure". But the moralistic undertones of the presentations were a disappointment to their audiences; the next ridotto, staged a fortnight later, was poorly attended and a financial disaster. Shortly after the second ridotto, the artist William Hogarth, who had an apartment near to the gardens at South Lambeth, found his friend Tyers in a depressed state trying to decide whether it was better to commit suicide by drowning or hanging himself. Hogarth's artworks were satires designed to communicate a moral lesson in a humorous manner and he suggested Tyers should use similar methods to educate those seeking entertainment at the Gardens. As an art collector with diverse interests Tyers already had a wide variety of friends in the artistic community and he commissioned several artists including Francis Hayman, – who Tyers later employed as his artistic director, a role he held for thirty years – Hubert-François Gravelot, Louis-François Roubiliac as well as Hogarth to undertake the task of transforming the gardens. The venue and its entertainments were promoted as being family friendly, yet to retain his profit margins Tyers ensured some areas remained unlit for the benefit of the sex workers.

== Denbies ==
In 1734 Tyers purchased Denbies, a farmhouse and grounds near Dorking, Surrey, where he built himself a weekend retreat. Tyers heard a milkmaid singing near there and arranged for Isabella Vincent to be trained as a singer and brought to London from in 1751. She was employed at his Vauxhall Gardens for ten seasons.

The house Tyers built by converting some of the farm buildings appears to have been of little architectural significance as very little is known about it, but the Gothic garden he installed in the grounds became notorious. In contrast to the cheerfulness and merriment of Tyers' Vauxhall Gardens, The Valley of the Shadow of Death as it was known was designed to constantly remind visitors of their mortality. David Coke and Alan Borg, authors of Vauxhall Gardens: A History (2012) have suggested that the contrast between the two gardens may have been symptomatic of "some sort of psychological imbalance" within Tyers, perhaps even "a form of bipolar disorder".

== Death and legacy ==
Tyers died at his home in Vauxhall pleasure gardens on either 26 June or 1 July 1767. The Denbies estate was subsequently sold, and his sons Thomas and Jonathan became joint proprietors of the pleasure garden.
