= Samuel Dyer (translator) =

English translator

Samuel Dyer (1725–1772) was an English translator.

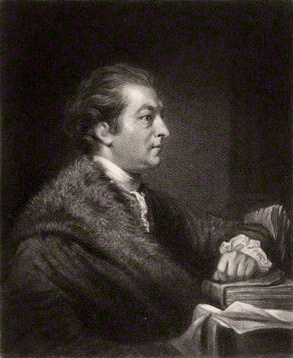
Samuel Dyer, 1836 mezzotint by Samuel William Reynolds, after Joshua Reynolds.

== Life ==
Dyer was the son of a jeweller in the City of London. His parents were dissenters, and he was intended for the ministry. After a school kept by John Ward near Moorfields, he was sent to Philip Doddridge's dissenting academy at Northampton. He went to the University of Glasgow, and then the University of Leyden, where he matriculated 16 September 1743 and stayed two years. He returned to England a classical scholar and mathematician, knowing French, Italian, and Hebrew, and a student of philosophy. He refused, however, to become a minister, or to take to any regular work, preferring to spend his time in literary society.

He was an original member of the Ivy Lane Club formed by Samuel Johnson in the winter of 1749, which met weekly at the King's Head inn. Through the influence of Samuel Chandler he obtained the work of translating into Latin a number of tracts left by Daniel Williams, the founder of the library; but he tired of this task. After a visit to France he resolved to translate François-Vincent Toussaint's Les Mœurs, but after the first sheets were printed stopped work Dyer's means at this time were very limited, his father having died and left the bulk of his property to his widow and eldest son and daughter. Johnson and Sir John Hawkins wanted Dyer to write a life of Erasmus, but he revised an old edition of Plutarch's Lives. For this edition (published by Jacob Tonson in 1758) he translated the lives of Pericles and Demetrius, and revised the whole work. He had also acted as tutor in Greek to Richard Gough.

In 1761 he was elected a Fellow of the Royal Society, and in 1766 was put on the council. He joined the Literary Club on its formation in 1764, where he was influential. Through this club Dyer first formed the acquaintance of Edmund Burke, to whom he later became close. Chamier, another member, obtained for Dyer an appointment in connection with the war office.

By the death of his mother and brother Dyer came into possession of £8,000, which he invested in East India Company stock, wishing to become a director. Failing in this, he speculated disastrously, at the suggestion of Johnson, in annuities on the estate of Ralph Verney, 2nd Earl Verney. Immediately after his loss he was seized with an attack of quinsy, from which he died 15 September 1772. It was hinted that he had committed suicide. The money he left was insufficient to pay for his funeral.

== Reputation ==
According to Sir John Hawkins, Dyer wilfully neglected the opportunities of his life, and was by his own choice and determination a sensualist of the worst type. Edmond Malone, though, declared that Hawkins's character of Dyer was "greatly overcharged and discoloured by the malignant prejudices of that shallow writer who, having quarrelled with Burke, carried his enmity even to Burke's friends". Thomas Percy agreed that it was a misrepresentation. Burke wrote the following notice of Dyer in one of the London papers:

He was a man of profound and general erudition, and his sagacity and judgment were fully equal to the extent of his learning. His mind was candid, sincere, and benevolent, his friendship disinterested and unalterable. The modest simplicity and sweetness of his manners rendered his conversation as amiable as it was instructive, and endeared him to those few who had the happiness of knowing intimately that valuable and unostentatious man.

Sir Joshua Reynolds and Malone both believed that Dyer was the author of Junius's Letters. The evidence was of a weak and circumstantial kind: immediately after Dyer's death, Reynolds, who was one of his executors, entered his rooms in Castle Street, Leicester Square, and found William Burke destroying a large quantity of manuscript. On Reynolds asking for an explanation, Burke answered that the papers were of great importance to himself, and of none to anybody else.
