= Helen Maria Williams =

British novelist, poet and translator

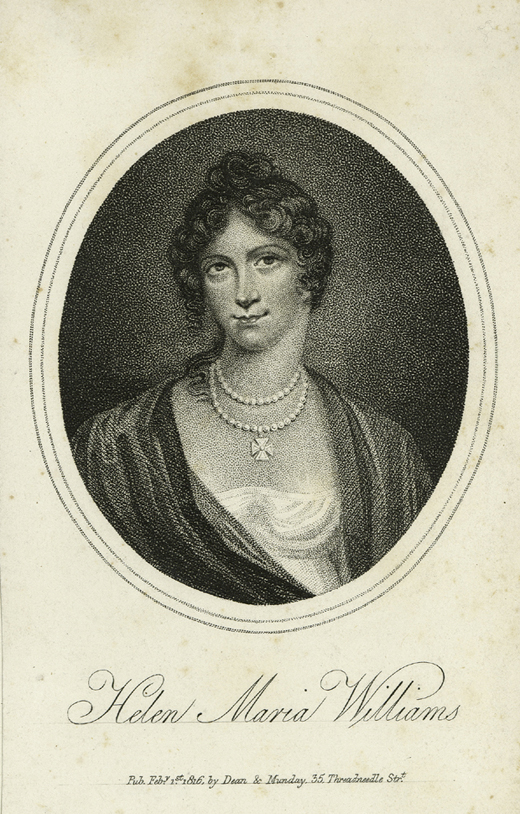
- Born: 17 June 1759; London, England
- Died: 15 December 1827 (aged 68); Paris, France
- Resting place: Père Lachaise Cemetery
- Occupations: novelist, poet, memoirist, reporter

Helen Maria Williams (17 June 1759 – 15 December 1827) was a British novelist, poet, and translator of French-language works. A religious dissenter, she was a supporter of abolitionism and of the ideals of the French Revolution; she was imprisoned in Paris during the Reign of Terror and spent much of the rest of her life in France. A controversial figure in her own time, the young Williams was favourably portrayed in a 1787 poem by William Wordsworth.

== Early years and education ==
She was born on 17 June 1759 in London to a Scottish mother, Helen Hay, and a Welsh army officer father, Charles Williams. She had an older sister, Cecilia (baptized 1760), and an older half-sister, Persis from her father's first marriage (born 1743). Her father died in December 1762 when she was two. He had previously served as Secretary for Minorca when it was a British possession, and accumulated enough personal property that his widow and daughters lived comfortably on the income from his estate and pension. They moved to Berwick-upon-Tweed. Williams later described herself as coming from a "family of women", growing up with only her mother and sisters. Williams described her upbringing in the preface to a 1786 book of poems as "a confined education."

== Career ==
In 1781, the Williams family moved to London, where Williams met Andrew Kippis, who would have great influence on her literary career and political views and brought her into contact with the leading London intellectuals of her time.

Her 1786 Poems touch on topics ranging from religion to a critique of Spanish colonial practices. She allied herself with the cult of feminine sensibility, deploying it politically in opposition to war ("Ode on the Peace," a 1786 poem about Peru) and slavery (the abolitionist "Poem on the Bill Lately Passed for Regulating the Slave Trade," 1788).

In the context of the Revolution Controversy, she came down on the side of the revolutionaries in her 1790 novel Julia and defied convention by travelling alone to revolutionary France, where she was hosted by Mme. Du Fossé, who had earlier, in London, given her lessons in French. Using her writings to give insight on revolutionary events for an international audience, historians have described Williams as an "early narrator" of the Age of Revolution. Her Letters Written In France marked a turn from being primarily a writer of poetry to one of prose. She enthusiastically attended the Fête de la Fédération on the anniversary of the storming of the Bastille and returning briefly to London in 1791 was a staunch, though not completely uncritical, defender of the Revolution. Returning to France in July 1791, she published a poem "A Farewell for two Years to England"; in fact she briefly visited England again in 1792, but only to persuade her mother and her sisters, Cecilia and Persis, to join her in France just as the country was moving toward the more violent phases of its revolution.

After the September Massacres of 1792, she allied herself with the Girondists; as a saloniere, she also hosted Mary Wollstonecraft, Francisco de Miranda and Thomas Paine. After the violent downfall of the Gironde and the rise of the Reign of Terror, she and her family were thrown into the Luxembourg prison where she was allowed to continue working on translations of French-language works into English, including what would prove to be a popular translation of Bernardin St. Pierre's novel Paul et Virginie, to which she appended her own prison sonnets. Upon her release, she travelled with John Hurford Stone to Switzerland. She was harshly criticised for this since Stone, separated from an unfaithful wife, was still legally a married man; the subsequent history of Williams and Stone's relationship only tended to confirm the rumours. Nonetheless, her few poems from this period continue to express Dissenting piety and were published in volumes with those of other religiously like-minded poets. In 1798, she published A Tour in Switzerland, which included an account of her travels, political commentary, and the poem "A Hymn Written Amongst the Alps."

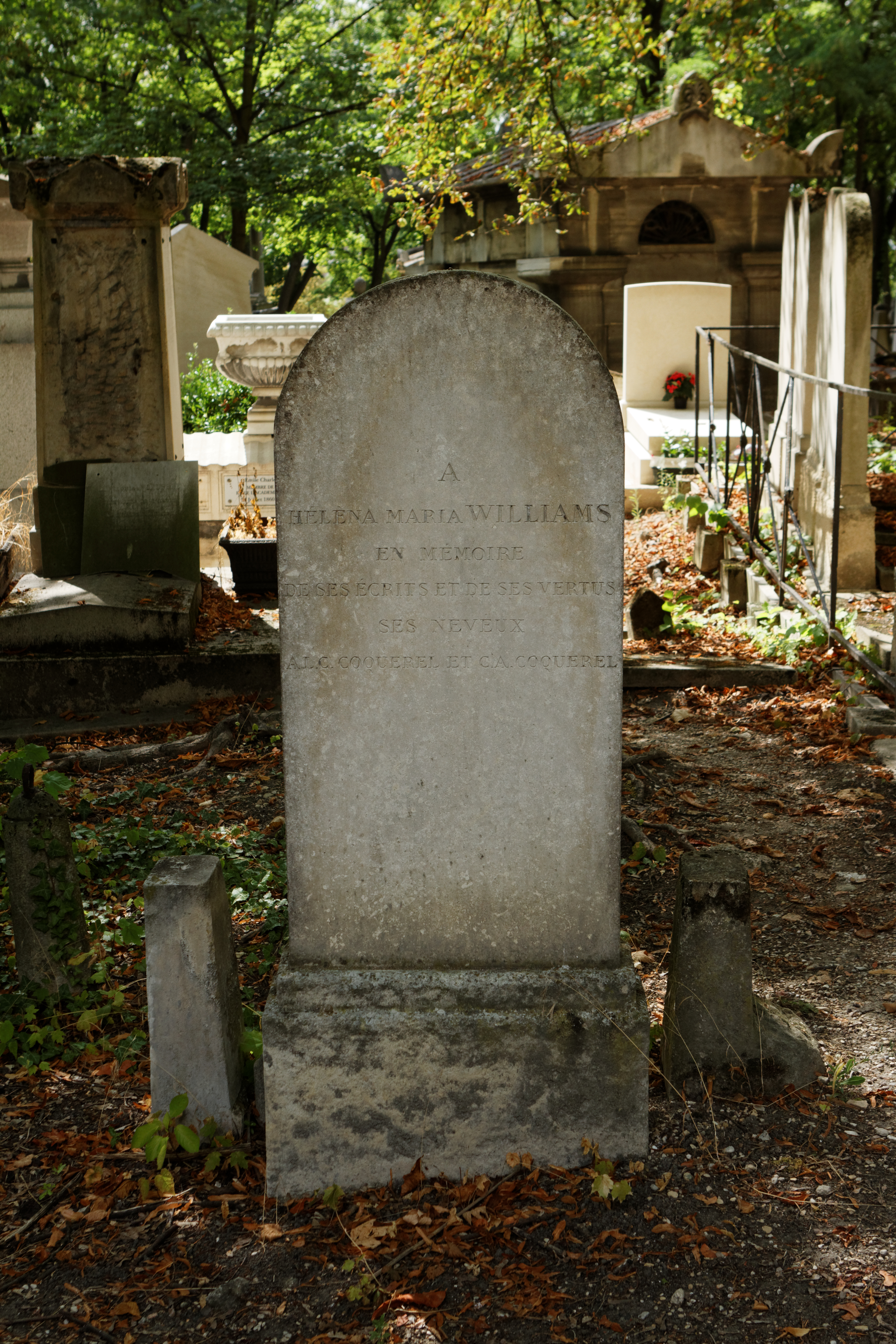
Williams' grave

Williams' 1801 Sketches of the State of Manners and Opinions in the French Republic showed a continued attachment to the original ideals of the French Revolution but a growing disenchantment with the rise of Napoleon; as emperor, he would declare her ode "The Peace signed between the French and the English" (also known as the "Ode on the Peace of Amiens") to be treasonable to France. Nonetheless, he proved to be, in this respect, more lenient than the Montagnard government had been to this now-famous international literary figure: she spent a single day in prison and continued to live and write in Paris. After the Bourbon Restoration, she became a naturalised French citizen in 1818; nonetheless, in 1819 she moved to Amsterdam to live with Athanase Laurent Charles Coquerel, a nephew she had helped raise. However, she was unhappy in Amsterdam and soon returned to Paris, where, until her death in 1827, she continued to be an important interpreter of French intellectual currents for the English-speaking world.

== Selected works ==
Williams' works consist of poetry, novels, volumes of letters, and translations. The lines are not always clear, as she might include an original poem in the preface of another work, even in a translation of someone else's work.

=== Poetry ===
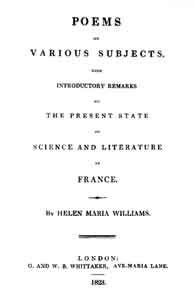
Title page of Poems on Various Subjects: With Introductory Remarks on the Present State of Science and Literature in France by Helen Maria Williams (London: Whittaker, 1823)

- Edwin and Eltruda. A legendary tale, 1782, her first published work
- An Ode on the Peace, 1783, celebrated the end of the American Revolution
- Peru, A Poem. In Six Cantos, 1784, an epic poem that critiques European colonialism
- Poems, 1786
- A Poem on the Bill Lately Passed for Regulating the Slave Trade, 1788
- A Farewell, for Two Years, To England, 1791
- "Ode to Peace," the Morning Chronicle, 1801
- Poems on various Subjects, 1823
  - "The Bastille, A Vision"

=== Novels ===
- Julia, 1790

=== Non-fiction ===
- Letters Written in France, 8 vols, 1790-–1796.
- A Narrative of the Events Which Have Taken Place in France, from the Landing of Napoleon Bonaparte ... Till the Restoration of Louis XVIII ..., 1815.
- Letters on Events which have passed in France since the Restoration in 1815, 1819
- A Tour in Switzerland, 1798.

=== Translations ===
- Paul and Virginia by Bernardin de Saint Pierre.
- The political and confidential correspondence of Lewis XVI with observations on each letter. London and New York, 1803.
- Williams also translated (from French to English) several works of Alexander von Humboldt, who was German but wrote in French.
  - Personal narrative of travels to the equinoctial regions of the New continent during the years 1799–1804, by Alexander de Humboldt and Aimé Bonpland; with maps, plans, etc. Longman, Hurst, Rees, etc., London 1814–1829
  - Researches concerning the institutions & monuments of the ancient inhabitants of America, with descriptions & views of some of the most striking scenes in the Cordilleras! Longman, Hurst, Rees, etc., London 1814
