= Thomas Tyers =

English playboy and dilettante author

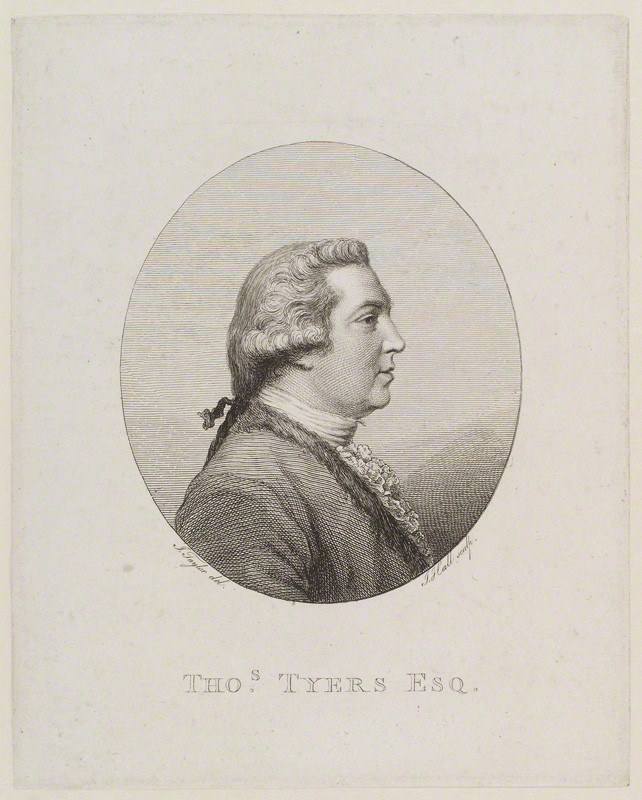
Thomas Tyers

Thomas Tyers (1726–1787) was an English playboy and dilettante author.

== Life ==
He was the eldest son of Jonathan Tyers, proprietor of Vauxhall Gardens in south London. He matriculated at Pembroke College, Oxford, on 13 December 1738, graduating B.A. 1742, and M.A. (from Exeter College) 1745. He was called to the bar at the Inner Temple in 1757.

On his father's death in 1767, Tyers became joint manager of Vauxhall Gardens with his brother Jonathan. His father had left him well off, and according to James Boswell in his Life of Samuel Johnson he "ran about the world with a pleasant carelessness". He was a favourite with Samuel Johnson, who used to call him Tom Tyers, and confessed that Tyers always told him something that he did not know before; it was he who said of Johnson that he always talked as if he were talking on oath.

Tyers had a villa at Ashtead, near Epsom in Surrey, and London apartments in Southampton Street, Covent Garden, and he used to drive around between them. He sold his share in Vauxhall Gardens in 1785, leaving the management to his brother Jonathan. He died at Ashtead, after a lingering illness, on 1 February 1787, in his sixty-first year. He was unmarried.

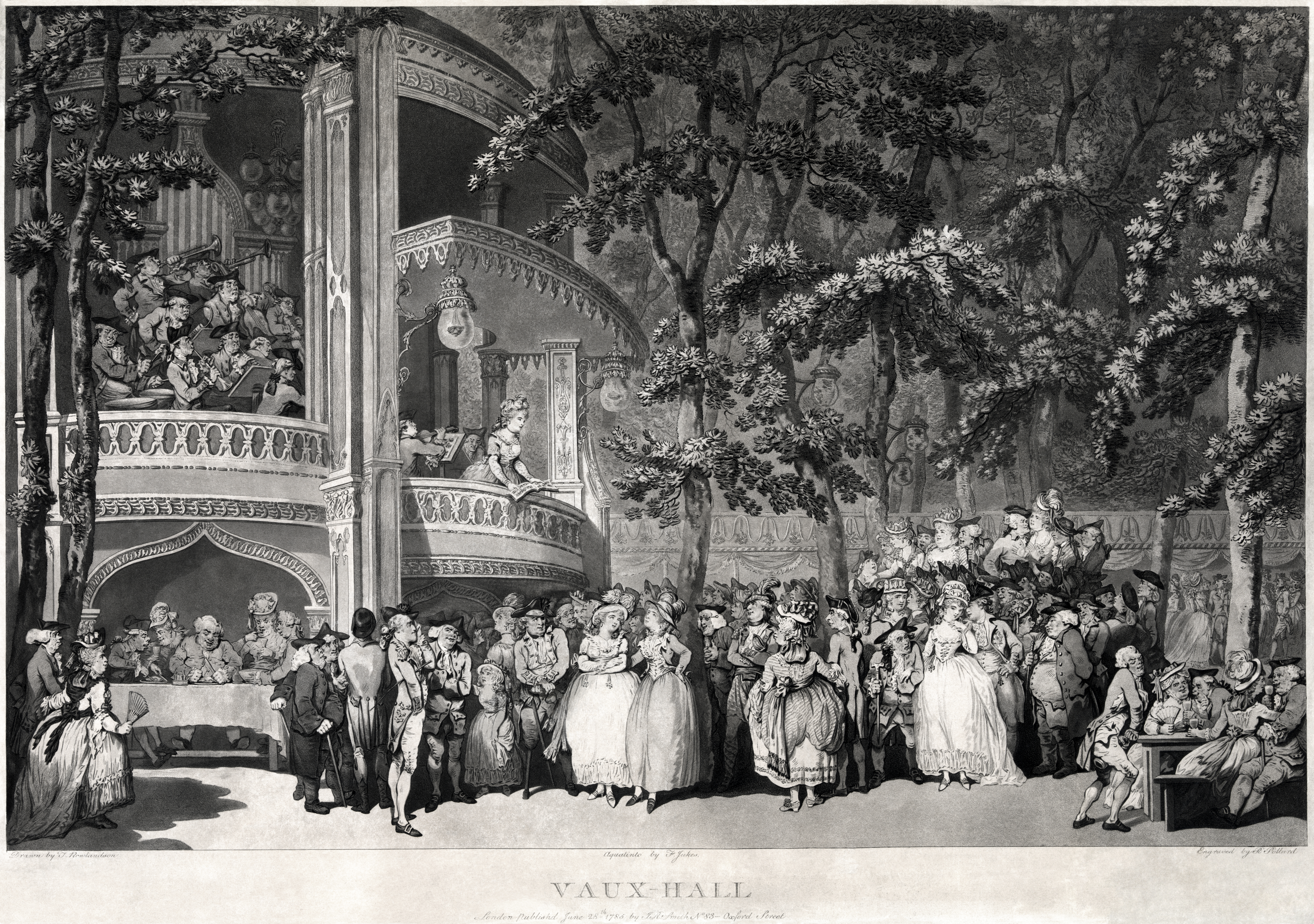
Vauxhall Gardens by Thomas Rowlandson; the central figure behind the tree may be Thomas Tyers

== Works ==
Tyers published:

- Political Conferences between several great men in the last and present century, 1780; 2nd edit. 1781.
- An Historical Rhapsody on Mr. Pope, 1781; 2nd edit. 1782.
- An Historical Essay on Mr. Addison, 1782, 1783.
- Conversations, Political and Familiar, 1784.
- A Biographical Sketch of Dr Samuel Johnson, published in The Gentleman's Magazine, 1785.

He wrote the words of many songs sung at Vauxhall, and contributed an account of the gardens to John Nichols's History and Antiquities of the Parish of Lambeth.

== Notes ==
Attribution

This article incorporates text from a publication now in the public domain: Lee, Sidney, ed. (1899). "Tyers, Thomas". Dictionary of National Biography. Vol. 57. London: Smith, Elder & Co.
