= Jean Claude Jacob =

French longevity claimant

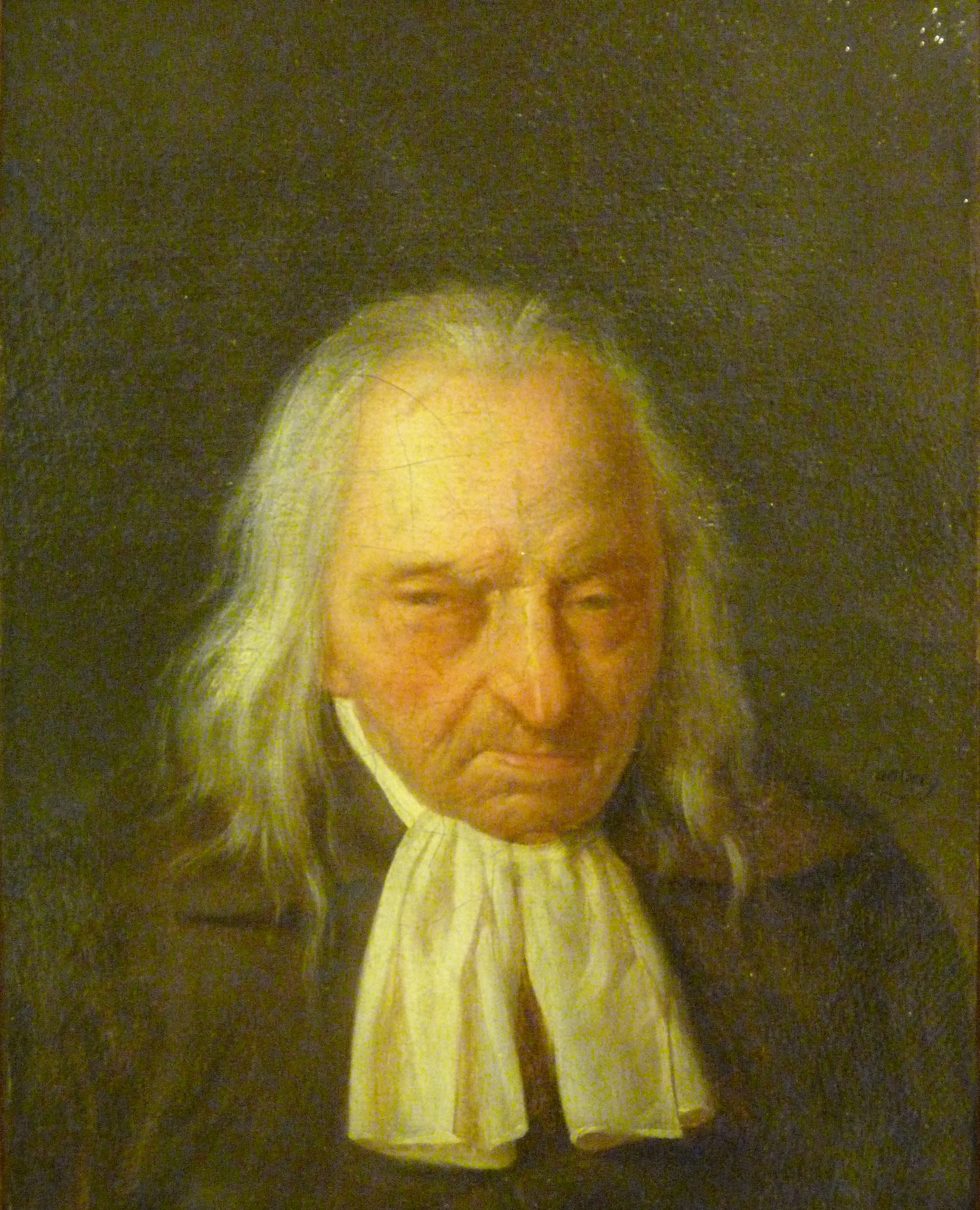
JF Garneray Lambinet

Jean Claude Jacob was a serf from the Jura Mountains, supposedly 120 years old, who was brought from his native place to figure as "dean of the human race" in Paris at the Festival of the Federation of July 1790. Thomas Carlyle wrote of Jacob in The French Revolution: A History:

Having seen the Human Species itself, to have seen the 'Dean of the Human Species,' ceased now to be a miracle. Such 'Doyen du Genre Humain, Eldest of Men,' had shewn himself there, in these weeks: Jean Claude Jacob, a born Serf, deputed from his native Jura Mountains to thank the National Assembly for enfranchising them. On his bleached worn face are ploughed the furrowings of one hundred and twenty years. He has heard dim patois-talk, of immortal Grand-Monarch victories; of a burnt Palatinate, as he toiled and moiled to make a little speck of this Earth greener; of Cevennes Dragoonings; of Marlborough going to the war. Four generations have bloomed out, and loved and hated, and rustled off: he was forty-six when Louis Fourteenth died. The Assembly, as one man, spontaneously rose, and did reverence to the Eldest of the World; old Jean is to take seance among them, honourably, with covered head. He gazes feebly there, with his old eyes, on that new wonder-scene; dreamlike to him, and uncertain, wavering amid fragments of old memories and dreams. For Time is all growing unsubstantial, dreamlike; Jean's eyes and mind are weary, and about to close, — and open on a far other wonder-scene, which shall be real. Patriot Subscription, Royal Pension was got for him, and he returned home glad; but in two months more he left it all, and went on his unknown way.

According to the Conservative C. R. L. Fletcher historian, this event did not occur at the Festival of the Federation but earlier in October 23, 1789 at the National Assembly, presented by Henri Grégoire. Jacob was part of a "travelling show" and had as evidence for his age a baptismal certificate dated October 10, 1669. Fletcher casts doubt that the Assembly provided a pension for support but the officers and men of the Lorraine regiment did raise 8,000 livre for Jacob.

He died at the claimed age of 121.
