= Laetitia Matilda Hawkins =

British writer

Laetitia Matilda Hawkins (baptized 8 August 1759 – 22 November 1835) was an English novelist, associated with Twickenham. She was the daughter of Sir John Hawkins, an acquaintance of Samuel Johnson.

Hawkins was an outspoken yet highly conservative British woman author. In 1793, she published the inflammatory Letters on the Female Mind, Its Powers and Pursuits. Addressed to Miss H.M. Williams, with particular reference to Her Letters from France, a two-volume attack on Helen Maria Williams's Continental political writings in her Letters Written in France. Hawkins asserted that 'every female politician is a hearsay politician'. The Analytical Review, a liberal paper, described Hawkins' Letters as a 'rant [...] written with much ill temper'.

She wrote at least four novels, including The Countess and Gertrude (1811), and she also acted as an amanuensis for her father. Her work was published anonymously until after Sir John died in 1789.

Beryl Bainbridge based a character in her novel According to Queeney on Hawkins.

Hawkins is one of the "lost" women writers listed by Dale Spender in Mothers of the Novel: 100 Good Women Writers Before Jane Austen.

== Works ==
- Letters on the Female Mind, Its Powers and Pursuits. Addressed to Miss H.M. Williams, with particular reference to Her Letters from France (1793)
- Rosanne; or A father’s labour lost (1814)
- Thoughts on our national calamity: in a letter to a friend in Ireland (1817)
- Heraline; or, Opposite proceedings (1821)
- Annaline; or, Motive-hunting (1824)
- Memoirs, anecdotes, facts and opinions (1824)
