= Fête de la Fédération =

1790 national holiday festival in France

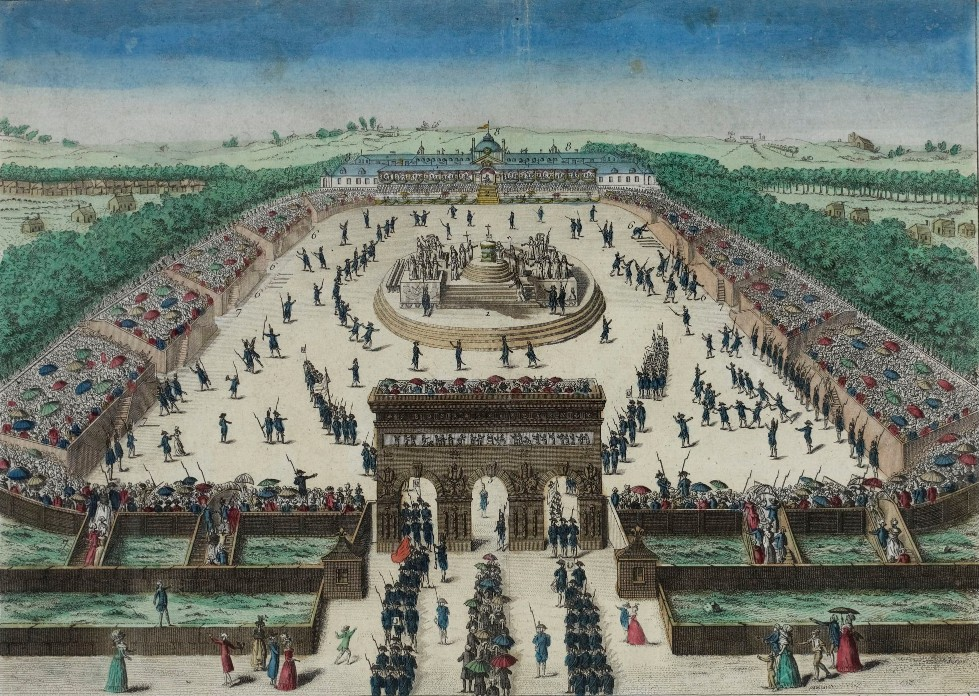
The Fête de la Fédération at Champ de Mars within the distance the King's tent (Musée de la Révolution française).

The Fête de la Fédération (French pronunciation: [fɛt də la fedeʁɑsjɔ̃]; lit. 'Festival of the Federation') was a massive holiday festival held throughout France in 1790 in honour of the French Revolution, celebrating the Revolution itself, as well as national unity.

It commemorated the revolution and events of 1789 which had culminated in a new form of national government, a constitutional monarchy led by a representative Assembly.

The inaugural fête of 1790 was set for 14 July, to coincide with the first anniversary of the storming of the Bastille, although that is not what was celebrated. At this relatively calm stage of the Revolution, many people considered France's period of political struggle to be over. This thinking was encouraged by the constitutional monarchist Monarchiens. The first fête was designed with a role for King Louis XVI that would respect and maintain his royal status, while emphasizing his new role as the citizen king of the incipient French liberal constitutional monarchy. The occasion passed peacefully and provided a powerful, yet illusory, image of celebrating national unity after the divisive events of 1789–1790.

== Background ==
After the initial revolutionary events of 1789, France's ancien régime had shifted into a new paradigm of constitutional monarchy. By the end of 1789, towns and villages throughout France began to join together as fédérations, fraternal associations which commemorated and promoted the new political structure.

A common theme among them was a wish for a nationwide expression of unity, a fête to honour the Revolution. Plans were set for simultaneous celebrations in July 1790 all over the nation, but the fête in Paris would be the most prominent by far. It would feature the King, the royal family, and all the deputies of the National Constituent Assembly, with thousands of other citizens predicted to arrive from all corners of France.

== Preparation ==
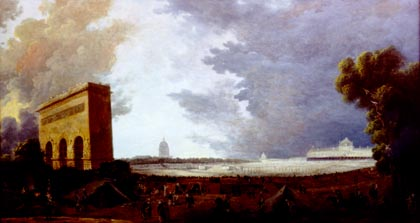
The triumphal arch of the Fête de la Fédération, by Hubert Robert.

The event took place on the Champ de Mars, which was at the time far outside Paris. The vast stadium had been financed by the National Assembly, and completed in time only with the help of thousands of volunteer laborers from the Paris region. During these "Wheelbarrow Days"(journée des brouettes), the festival workers popularised a new song that would become an enduring anthem of France, Ah! ça ira.

Enormous earthen stands for spectators were built on each side of the field, with a seating capacity estimated at 100,000. The Seine was crossed by a bridge of boats leading to an altar where oaths were to be sworn. The new military school was used to harbour members of the National Assembly and their families. At one end of the field, a huge tent was the king's step, and at the other end, a triumphal arch was built. At the centre of the field was an altar for the mass.

== Official celebration ==
The feast began as early as four in the morning, under a strong rain which lasted the whole day. The Journal de Paris had predicted "frequent downpours".

Fourteen thousand fédérés came from the provinces, every single National Guard unit having sent two men out of every hundred. They were ranged under eighty-three banners, according to their département. They were brought to the place where the Bastille once stood, and went through Saint-Antoine, Saint-Denis and Saint-Honoré streets before crossing the temporary bridge and arriving at the Champ de Mars.

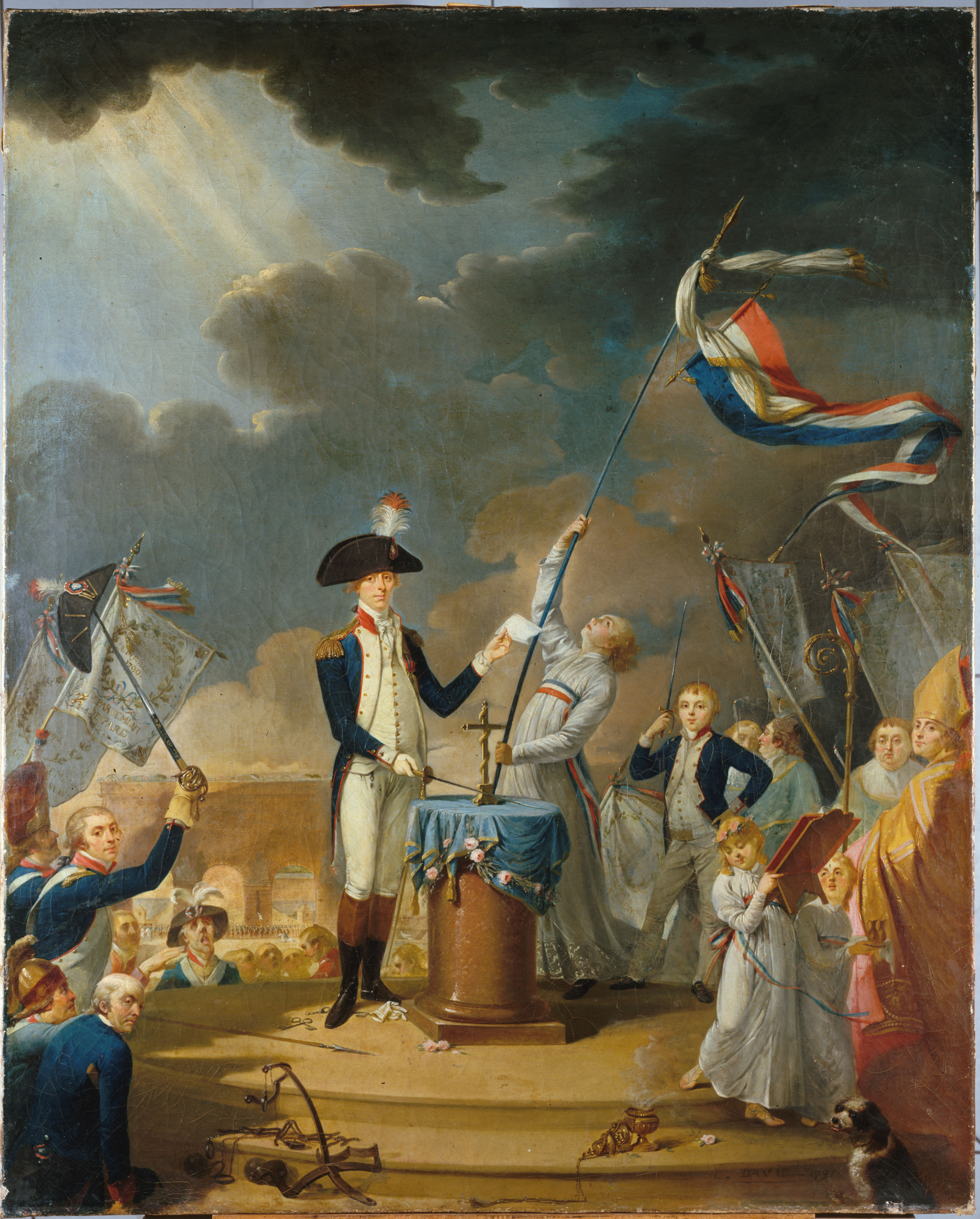
Lafayette leading the oath, 18th c. oil painting, Musée Carnavalet

A mass was celebrated by Charles Maurice de Talleyrand, bishop of Autun. At this time, the first French Constitution was not yet completed, and it would not be officially ratified until September 1791. But the gist of it was understood by everyone, and no one was willing to wait. Lafayette led the President of the National Assembly and all the deputies in a solemn oath to the coming Constitution:

We swear to be forever faithful to the Nation, to the Law and to the King, to uphold with all our might the Constitution as decided by the National Assembly and accepted by the King, and to remain united with all French people by the indissoluble bonds of brotherhood.

Afterwards, Louis XVI took a similar vow: "I, King of the French, swear to use the power given to me by the constitutional act of the State, to maintain the Constitution as decreed by the National Assembly and accepted by myself." The title "King of the French", used here for the first time instead of "King of France (and Navarre)", was an innovation intended to inaugurate a popular monarchy which linked the monarch's title to the people rather than the territory of France. The Queen Marie Antoinette then rose and showed the Dauphin, future Louis XVII, saying: "This is my son, who, like me, joins in the same sentiments."

The festival organisers welcomed delegations from countries around the world, including the recently established United States. John Paul Jones, Thomas Paine and other Americans unfurled their Stars and Stripes at the Champ de Mars, the first instance of the flag being flown outside of the United States.

== Popular feast ==
After the end of the official celebration, the day ended in a huge popular feast. It was also a symbol of the reunification of the Three Estates, after the heated Estates-General of 1789, with the Bishop (First Estate) and the King (Second Estate) blessing the people (Third Estate). In the gardens of the Château de La Muette, a meal was offered to more than 20,000 participants, followed by much singing, dancing, and drinking. The feast ended on 18 July.

== Trivia ==
- The Chant du 14 juillet, written by Marie-Joseph Chénier and François-Joseph Gossec, was sung in the Écoles Normales until the Second World War.
- Jean Claude Jacob, a serf from the Jura Mountains, supposedly 120 years old, was brought from his native place to figure as "Dean of the Human Race".
