= The Club (dining club) =

London dining club founded in 1764 by Joshua Reynolds, Samuel Johnson, and Edmund Burke

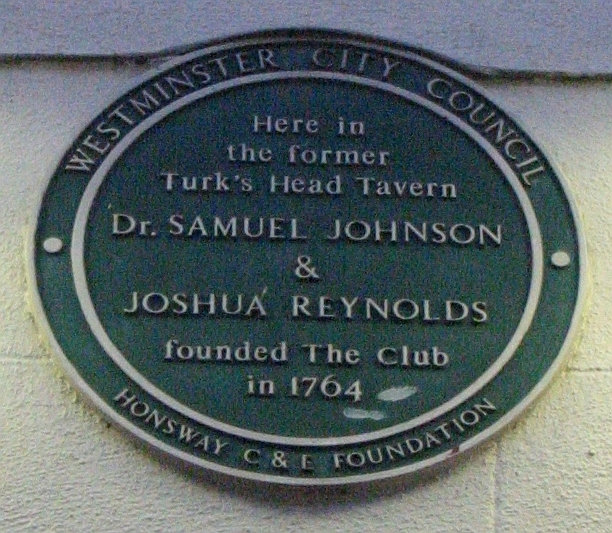
Plaque marking the foundation of the Club

The Club or Literary Club is a London dining club founded in February 1764 by Joshua Reynolds, Samuel Johnson, and Edmund Burke.

== Description ==
Initially, the Club would meet one evening per week at seven, at the Turk's Head Inn in Gerrard Street, Soho. Later, meetings were reduced to once per fortnight whilst Parliament was in session, and were held at rooms in St James's Street. Though the initial formation was proposed by Sir Joshua Reynolds, Dr. Samuel Johnson became the person most closely associated with the Club.

John Timbs, in his Club Life in London, gives an account of the Club's centennial dinner in 1864, which was celebrated at the Clarendon hotel. Henry Hart Milman, the English historian, was treasurer. The Club's toast, no doubt employing a bit of wishful thinking, was "Esto perpetua", Latin for "Let it be perpetual". This Latin phrase traces its origin to the last dying declaration of Paolo Sarpi (1552–1623) the Venetian theologian, philosopher and canon law expert who uttered these words towards the Venetian Republic, whose independence he devoutly espoused. The introduction of the phrase to Britain was probably through Sir Joshua Reynolds who went to Italy for his higher training in Renaissance art and painting with the contemporary Italian masters.

== Members ==
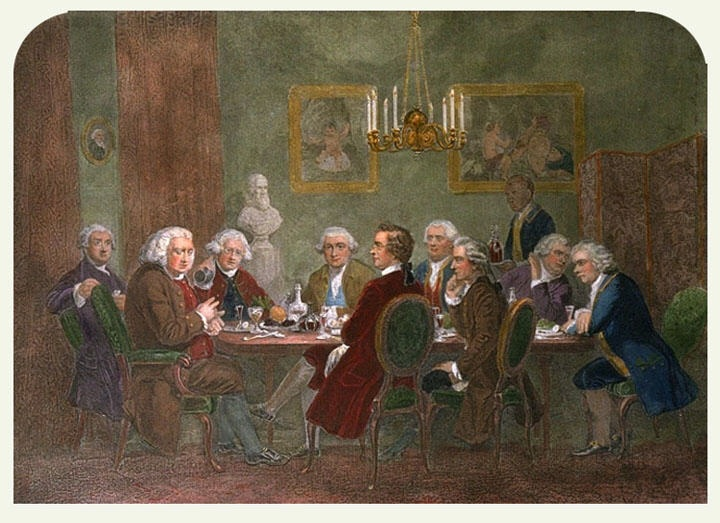
A literary party at Sir Joshua Reynolds's. The 1851 engraving after Doyle shows the friends of Reynolds—many of whom were members of "The Club"—use cursor to identify each person

The nine original members were:

- Joshua Reynolds: artist
- Samuel Johnson: essayist, lexicographer
- Edmund Burke: writer, later M.P.
- Christopher Nugent
- Topham Beauclerk
- Bennet Langton
- Oliver Goldsmith: author, playwright, poet
- Anthony Chamier
- John Hawkins: author

Hereafter membership was by unanimous election only. Existing members would submit a black ball if a nominee was disfavored. Shortly following the establishment of the original nine, Samuel Dyer became the first elected member. Hawkins left in 1768, suffering ostracism for his verbal abuse of Burke. Membership was then increased to 12; the new seats were filled by barrister Robert Chambers, and writers Thomas Percy and George Colman. A membership of 12 was deemed optimal to retain a qualitative exclusivity. Of Johnson's goal, Percy claimed:

It was intended the Club should consist of Such men, as that if only Two of them chanced to meet, they should be able to entertain each other without wanting the addition of more Company to pass the Evening agreeably.

Later member Charles Burney wrote that Johnson wanted a group "composed of the heads of every liberal and literary profession" and "have somebody to refer to in our doubts and discussions, by whose Science we might be enlightened."

The Club grew to 16 members in 1773, then to 21 in late 1775. Newly elected were: David Garrick, Adam Smith (economist, philosopher), Sir William Jones (philologist), George Steevens, (Shakespearean commentator), James Boswell (diarist, author), Charles James Fox (M.P.), George Fordyce (physician/chemist), James Caulfeild, 1st Earl of Charlemont, Agmondesham Vesey, Sir Thomas Charles Bunbury, Edward Gibbon (author), and Thomas Barnard.

By 1783 the number had risen again to 35, including several Whig politicians, so that Johnson and other older members began to attend dinners less frequently. Johnson even founded another club, the Essex Head Club. A fact often neglected was that when the Club was founded, Edmund Burke had already founded a successful political and debating society, Edmund Burke's Club (in 1747), whilst still a student at Trinity College, Dublin. It has been suggested that the Club was initially no more than a kind of friendship club, initiated by Joshua Reynolds to help the lonely Dr Samuel Johnson. But it was no doubt Burke who pushed for the idea of a Club rather than just a circle of friends, and it was his personality that had the greater influence; hence the increasingly political nature of the Club in the next century.

By 1791, eight years after the death of Johnson, the membership recorded by James Boswell included:

- Lord Charlemont
- Bishop Thomas Percy
- Charles Fox
- George Fordyce
- Joseph Banks
- Edward Gibbon
- Joseph Warton
- Lord Spencer
- Lord Palmerston

=== 19th century ===
The historian Henry Reeve recorded details of Club membership in his diaries.

Members in the 1800s included:

- George Hamilton-Gordon, 4th Earl of Aberdeen
- Henry Petty-FitzMaurice, 3rd Marquess of Lansdowne
- Charles Eastlake
- Henry Brougham, 1st Baron Brougham and Vaux (9 March 1830)
- Philip Stanhope, 5th Earl Stanhope (14 May 1833)
- Henry Hart Milman (23 February 1836)
- Sir Henry Holland (18 February 1840)
- William Whewell
- Charles Austin (7 March 1843)
- Thomas Pemberton Leigh, 1st Baron Kingsdown (25 February 1845)
- George Villiers, 4th Earl of Clarendon (20 May 1845)
- Richard Owen (20 May 1845)
- Sylvain Van de Weyer (9 February 1847)
- Sir David Dundas (23 February 1847)
- Harry Powlett, 4th Duke of Cleveland (5 June 1849)
- Samuel Wilberforce (5 June 1849)
- Samuel Jones-Loyd, 1st Baron Overstone (25 June 1850)
- George Campbell, 8th Duke of Argyll (17 June 1851)
- Robert Rolfe, 1st Baron Cranworth (17 June 1851)
- Sir William Stirling-Maxwell (21 February 1854)
- William Gladstone (10 March 1857)
- John Russell, 1st Earl Russell (21 April 1857)
- George Grote, (9 March 1858)
- Edward Stanley, Lord Stanley (14 February 1860)
- William Wood, 1st Baron Hatherley (14 February 1860)
- George Richmond (14 February 1860)
- Archibald Campbell Tait (9 April 1861)
- Henry Reeve (9 April 1861)
- Roderick Murchison (18 June 1861)
- Edmund Walker Head (25 February 1862)
- Robert Lowe, 1st Viscount Sherbrooke (12 May 1863)
- Spencer Walpole (8 March 1864)
- Arthur Penrhyn Stanley (28 February 1865)
- James Anthony Froude (28 February 1865)
- Henri d'Orléans, duc d'Aumale (14 March 1865)
- Alfred Tennyson, 1st Baron Tennyson (14 March 1865)
- Hugh Cairns, 1st Earl Cairns (27 February 1866)
- Edward Twisleton (24 April 1866)
- Charles Thomas Newton (4 March 1879)
- Joseph Dalton Hooker (4 March 1879)
- Matthew Arnold (28 February 1882)
- Joseph Boehm (27 November 1888)
- Edward Maunde Thompson (27 November 1888)
- William Thomson, 1st Baron Kelvin (26 April 1892)

By 1881, the members of the club included John Tyndall, Sir Frederic Leighton, and Lord Houghton, with Henry Reeve serving as treasurer. Other prominent 19th century members included Lord Macaulay, Thomas Huxley, Lord Acton, Lord Dufferin, W. H. E. Lecky, and Prime Minister Lord Salisbury.

=== 20th century ===
Winston Churchill and F. E. Smith had both desired to join The Club but were considered too controversial. In response, in 1911, they founded The Other Club, which continues to maintain itself as a political dining society. Meanwhile, The Club continues, meeting at Brooks's.
