= John Hawkins (author) =

English author and music historian (1719–1789)

Sir John Hawkins
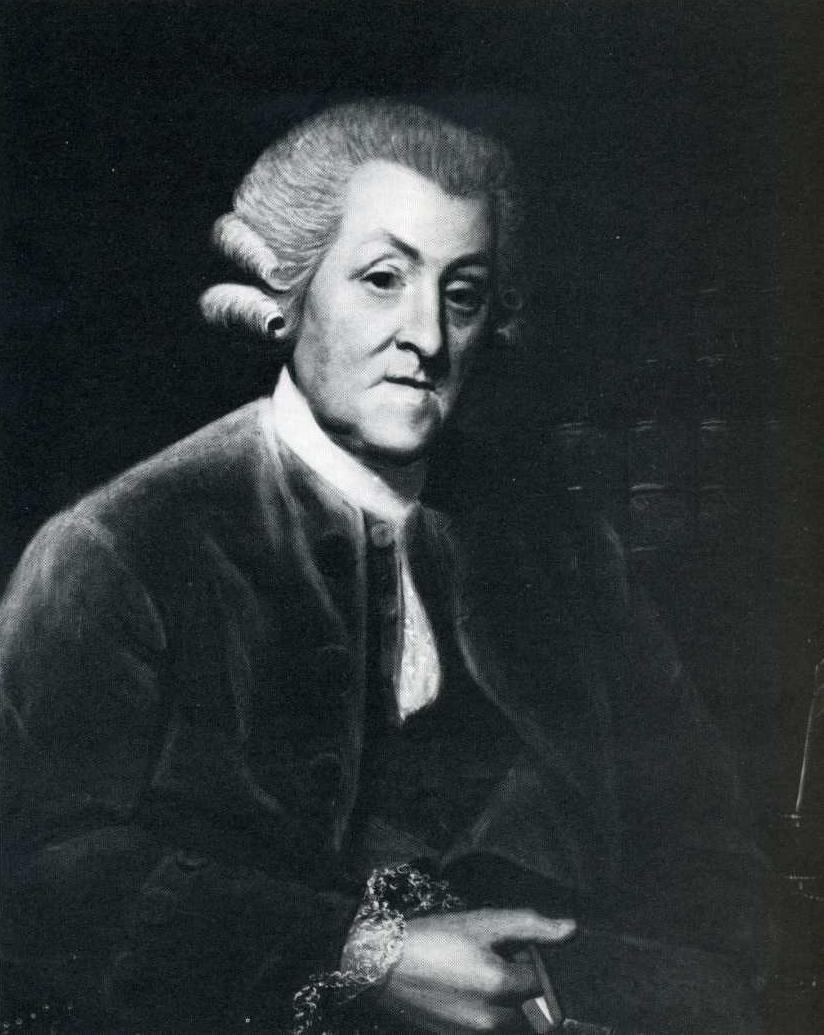
- Sir John Hawkins 1786, after a painting by James Roberts

Chairman of the Middlesex Quarter Sessions
- In office 1765–1780
- Preceded by: George Jeffreys, 1st Baron Jeffreys
- Succeeded by: William Mainwaring

Personal details
- Born: 29 March 1719
- Died: 21 May 1789 (aged 70)
- Children: 5, including Laetitia and John

Sir John Hawkins (29 March 1719 – 21 May 1789) was an English writer and friend of Dr Samuel Johnson and Horace Walpole. He was part of Johnson's various clubs but later left The Literary Club after a disagreement with some of Johnson's other friends. His friendship with Johnson continued and he was made one of the executors of Johnson's will.

During his life, he wrote many works, including A General History of the Science and Practice of Music and his Life of Samuel Johnson in memory of his friend. He was appointed as a magistrate and later became Chairman of the Quarter Session for Middlesex. He was knighted in 1772 for his services.

== Biography ==
Hawkins first was brought up to follow in the footsteps of his father to become an architect. However, before the age of 30 he established a successful business as a solicitor. He married Sidney Storer in 1753 and retired from all professional vocations in 1759 after his wife had received a large inheritance due to the death of her brother. In 1760 the family moved to Twickenham, near Horace Walpole, where Hawkins published an edition of Walton's The Complete Angler; Or, Contemplative Man's Recreation: Being a Discourse On Rivers, Fish-Ponds, Fish, and Fishing. In 1763, he published a document on the state of the Highways which has been considered to be the basis for the Highway Act 1835. Following the commission of the peace in 1771 he acted as a magistrate for the county of Middlesex. Hawkins was knighted in 1772, and served as Chairman of the Middlesex Quarter Sessions. In 1773, he provided the notes for a new Shakespeare edition.

It took Hawkins 16 years to write A General History of the Science and Practice of Music which was published in 1776. Although this publication was somewhat respected, it soon was overshadowed, with the help of the likes such as Dr Callcott who composed a mocking song against Hawkins, by Charles Burney's General History of Music (1776–89). However, in years to come Hawkins's music history was considered to be superior to Burney's music history (compare the 1875 edition of Hawkins's work). Burney's discourse on Handel and Bach was viewed as being particularly inadequate.

Within hours of Johnson's death, Thomas Cadell and William Strahan asked Hawkins to write a biography and an edition of works for Johnson. He soon produced the first full-length biography of Johnson, the Life of Samuel Johnson (1787). This has been largely eclipsed, except for specialists, by the far longer and more colourful work (with the same title) published by James Boswell four years later. But Hawkins had known Johnson about twice as long as Boswell, since the 1740s, and his work, from which Boswell freely pillaged, covers some aspects of Johnson much better. Hawkins was more attuned to Johnson's strongly religious nature, and was with Johnson when he died, unlike Boswell who had been in Scotland for some months.

== Family ==
Hawkins married in 1753 the heiress Sidney Storer (1726–1793), second daughter of the attorney Peter Storer. With two daughters who died in infancy, their children were two sons, John Sidney Hawkins and Henry, and a daughter, the novelist Laetitia Matilda Hawkins.
