= List of Stevens Institute of Technology alumni =

Stevens Institute of Technology is a private university in Hoboken, New Jersey. Following are some of its notable alumni.

== Art and architecture ==
- Alexander Calder, M.E. 1919, creator of the Mobile and popularizer of that art form
- Branson DeCou, photographer known for his portrayal of "Dream Pictures", photographic slides accompanied by musical compositions
- Edwin Augustus Stevens Jr., marine engineer, naval architect, and a founder of Cox & Stevens
- Hobart Upjohn, architect, best known for designing several ecclesiastical and educational structures in New York and North Carolina

== Business ==
- Igor Ansoff, business manager and one of the fathers of strategic management
- Lawrence Babbio, B.E. 1966, vice chairman and president of Verizon Communications, Domestic Telecom Group<re
- Samuel P. Bush, 1884, steel and railroad executive, public servant, patriarch of Bush political family
- Alex Cable, optical engineer and founder of the optical equipment manufacturer Thorlabs
- Paul Aaron Langevin Doty, vice-president and general manager of the St. Paul Gas Light Co and president of St. Paul Trust and Savings Bank
- Henry Gantt, M.S. 1902, developed the Gantt chart, an important project management tool
- O. Milton Gossett, advertising executive with Compton Advertising and Saatchi & Saatchi
- John L. Hanigan, CEO of Genesco (1977–1981) and chairman (1977–1984)
- Arthur H. Harper, president and chief executive officer of the Equipment Services Division of General Electric
- Edward V. Hartford, founder and president of the Hartford Suspension Company who perfected the automobile shock absorber
- Edwin J. Hess, senior vice president of Exxon
- Sandeep Mathrani, M.E. 1983, real-estate executive and former CEO of WeWork
- Eugene McDermott, M.E. 1953, founder, Texas Instruments
- Charles Stewart Mott, M.E. 1897, co-founder of General Motors Corporation
- Julianne Mweheire, Ugandan management professional, accountant, and corporate executive
- David S. Rose, entrepreneur and angel investor
- Robert Crooks Stanley B.E. 1899, president and chairman of the International Nickel Company, known for discovering the alloy Monel
- Philip Dakin Wagoner, businessman, chairman of the Underwood Typewriter Company

== Education ==
- Igor Ansoff, B.E. 1941, creator of the Ansoff Matrix, and founding dean of the Owen Graduate School of Management at Vanderbilt University in Nashville, Tennessee
- Allan Borodin, computer scientist and professor at the University of Toronto
- Robert F. Boruch, professor of Education and Statistics with the University of Pennsylvania Graduate School of Education
- Richard Bronson, professor emeritus of mathematics at Fairleigh Dickinson University
- Morgan Brooks, inventor, engineer, and academic
- William W. Destler, B.S. 1968, former president of Rochester Institute of Technology
- Howard Wilson Emmons, professor in the department of Mechanical Engineering at Harvard University
- David J. Farber, B.E. 1956, professor of Department of Engineering and Public Policy at Carnegie Mellon, inducted into the Pioneers Circle of the Internet Hall of Fame
- Walter Gekelman, plasma physics professor at the University of California, Los Angeles
- Richard Herman, B.S. 1963, chancellor of the University of Illinois at Urbana–Champaign
- Alexander Crombie Humphreys, mechanical and consulting engineer and the 2nd president of Stevens Institute of Technology
- Richard Ernest Kronauer, professor of Mechanical Engineering, emeritus, at Harvard University
- Edmund R. Malinowski, professor of chemistry
- Fred Maryansk, president of Nevada State College
- James H. Mulligan Jr., M.S. 1945, electrical engineer and dean and professor of electrical and computer engineering of University of California, Irvine
- George Adam Pfeiffer, mathematician and instructor at Harvard University and Princeton University
- Lingan S. Randolph, mechanical engineer, consulting engineer, and Professor of Mechanical Engineering at Virginia Tech
- Jeffrey I. Seeman, historian of science, chemist, and Visiting Senior Research Scholar in the Department of Chemistry at the University of Richmond
- John Stachel, physicist and head of the Boston University Center for Einstein Studies
- Zehev Tadmor, Israeli chemical engineer and president of the Technion-Israel Institute of Technology
- Cardinal Warde, professor of Electrical Engineering at Massachusetts Institute of Technology
- Roger Wartell, former chair of the school of biology, part of the College of Sciences at the Georgia Institute of Technology

== Entertainment ==
- Wyn Barnum and Ricky Dana, members of alternative rock band Phoneboy
- Marques Brownlee, B.S. 2015, video producer, host, technology reviewer, Internet personality, and ultimate frisbee player on the New York Empire, best known for his technology-focused YouTube channel
- Will Morrissey, lyricist, vaudeville actor, playwright, and theatrical producer
- Jay Weinberg, B.S. 2014, musician and former drummer for the heavy metal band Slipknot

== Government and civil service ==
- Peter Ashmun Ames, 1911, MI5 operative
- Jed Babbin, B.E. 1970, former U.S. deputy undersecretary of defense and author
- Holly Bakke, commissioner of the New Jersey Department of Banking and Insurance
- John A. Bensel, civil engineer and New York State Engineer and Surveyor
- Walter Kidde, B.E. 1897, founder of Walter Kidde Constructors and served as New Jersey State Highway commissioner

== Military ==
- Joseph Rochefort, naval officer and cryptanalyst

== Politics ==
- Leon Febres Cordero, M.E. 1953, president of Ecuador, 1984–1988
- William C. Dodge, politician in New York City
- Carmelo Garcia, New Jersey General Assembly
- Greg Gianforte, B.E., M.S. 1983, former U.S. representative for Montana, governor of Montana, and founder of RightNow Technologies,
- Thomas S. Hanson, Wisconsin State Assembly
- Harold Harrison, 1892, Minnesota state legislator and businessman

== Science ==
- Mark Cardillo, chemist at The Camille and Henry Dreyfus Foundation
- Aaron Cohen, M.S. 1958, director of NASA, 1986–1993
- Gerald Goertzel, B.E., theoretical physicist who worked on the Manhattan Project and creator of the Goertzel algorithm
- Alfred G. Mayer, marine biologist and zoologist
- Frederick Reines, M.E. 1939, M.S. 1943, discoverer of the neutrino, recipient of the 1995 Nobel Prize in Physics
- Linda Vigilant, geneticist at the Department of Primate Behavior and Evolution at the Max Planck Institute for Evolutionary Anthropology
- Frederick Winslow Taylor, M.E. 1883, developer of scientific management methods and time-motion studies

== Sports ==
- Jon Denning, NASCAR driver
- C. Temple Emmet, sportman
- Chris Gavina, professional basketball coach
- Al McGall, professional football and track and field coach

== Technology and engineering ==
- Edward G. Amoroso, computer security professional, entrepreneur, author, and educator
- Walter Edwin Arnoldi, engineer mainly known for the Arnoldi iteration
- Igor Bensen, B.E. 1940, founder of Bensen Aircraft
- Lorinda Cherry, computer scientist and member of the original Unix Lab at Bell Labs
- Charles Herbert Colvin, aeronautical engineer
- Mark Crispin, B.S. 1977, inventor of IMAP
- Frank J. Effenberger, B.E. 1988, PON technology development and standardization; fellow of IEEE, OSA and Huawei
- Thelma Estrin, computer scientist and engineer who did pioneering work in the fields of expert systems and biomedical engineering
- Joseph A. Falcon, mechanical engineer and business executive
- Alfred Fielding, 1939, co-inventor of Bubble Wrap
- Gerard Joseph Foschini, Ph.D. 1967, prominent telecommunications engineer who is in the top 0.5% of most widely cited authors
- Amber Gell, engineer, scientist, and program manager at Lockheed Martin
- Alfred Wolcott Gibbs, mechanical engineer and chief mechanical engineer of the Pennsylvania Railroad
- Louis A. Hazeltine, M.E., Sc. D., 1926, founder Hazeltine Corporation, inventor of the neutrodyne radio receiver
- Augustus Moore Herring, aviation pioneer
- Peter Cooper Hewitt, electrical engineer and inventor of the Mercury arc rectifier
- Beatrice Hicks, M.S. 1949, founding president of the Society of Women Engineers and first woman engineer hired by Western Electric
- Lawrence C. F. Horle, electrical engineer and chief engineer of the de Forest Radio Telephone and Telegraph Company
- John White Howell, M.E., electrical engineer who furthered the development of the incandescent lamp, recipient of the 1924 Edison Medal, former president of the Edison Pioneers
- John Iacono, computer scientist specializing in data structures, algorithms and computational geometry and one of the inventors of the tango tree
- David Schenk Jacobus, mechanical engineer, head of the Engineering Department of Babcock & Wilcox, inventor, and educator
- Carlos Katz, electrical engineer and researcher
- Robert Thurston Kent, mechanical engineer, editor of Industrial Engineering and consultant, known as one of the foremen of scientific management
- Béla G. Lipták, engineer consultant specializing in the fields of safety, automation, process control, optimization, and renewable energy
- Frederick B. Llewellyn, electrical engineer, Bell Telephone Laboratories
- Herbert Merrick, mechanical engineer and inventor of beltweighers
- Harold Mooz, systems engineer and business consultant
- Chadwell O'Connor, B.E., inventor of the fluid-damped camera head, variations of which are used in most tripods to film motion
- Charles Petzold, B.S., M.S. 1975, computer programmer and author
- Richard H. Rice, M.E. 1885; Hon. Ph.D. 1921, mechanical engineer and inventor
- Rich Rosen, software developer
- Jean Scholtz, computer scientist known for her contributions to human–computer interaction
- Frederick Winslow Taylor, mechanical engineer
- Ralph Hazlett Upson, aeronaut, pioneer aviation designer from the ZMC-2 metalclad airship to the X-20 Dyna-Soar, academic
- Charles Walton, M.E., electrical engineer and inventor of RFID
- Peter Zampardi, B.E., microwave engineer

== Writing and journalism ==
- Joseph Bushnell Ames, 1901, novelist
- William Raimond Baird, namesake of Baird's Manual of American College Fraternities and publisher and editor of its early editions
- Fred H. Colvin, M.E. Hon. 1944, journalist, author, and editor
- L. Sprague de Camp, M.S., 1933, science fiction author, Lest Darkness Fall, The Wheels of If, The Great Monkey Trial, winner of the Hugo Award (1997)
- Frank D. Graham, prolific writer of Audel's guides
- Warren Hastings Miller, author and editor of the magazine Field & Stream
- John A. Nagy, M.M.S. 1979, author on espionage and mutinies of the American Revolution
- Richard Reeves, M.E. 1960, Emmy Award winner, syndicated columnist, author, television commentator
- Robert Weinberg, author whose work spans several genres including non-fiction, science fiction, horror, and comic books
