= Liptak =

Liptak or Lipták (Slovak/Czech feminine: Liptáková) is a surname. Notable people with the surname include:

- Adam Liptak (born 1960), American journalist
- Attila Lipták, Hungarian sprint canoer
- Béla G. Lipták (born 1936), Hungarian engineer
- David Liptak (born 1948), American composer and music teacher
- Jiří Lipták (born 1982), Czech trap shooter
- Juraj Lipták, Slovak sprint canoer
- Ľubomír Lipták (1930–2003), Slovak historian
- Martina Liptáková (born 1965), Czech basketball player
- Matthew Liptak (born 1970), AFL footballer
- Mattie Liptak (born 1996), American actor
- Miroslav Lipták (born 1968), Slovak cyclist
- Pál Lipták (1914–2000), Hungarian anthropologist
- Peter Lipták (born 1989), Slovak football player
- Vanessa Ray Liptak (born 1981), American actress and singer
- Zoltán Lipták (born 1984), Hungarian footballer
