= Arthur Harper =

Arthur Harper may refer to:

- Arthur Cyprian Harper (1866–1948), mayor of Los Angeles, California, 1906–1909
- Arthur Paul Harper (1865–1955), New Zealand lawyer, mountaineer, explorer, businessman and conservationist
- Arthur Harper (trader) (1835–1897), immigrant to the U.S. from northern Ireland, trader and miner in Alaska, British Columbia and California, in Alaska Mining Hall of Fame
- Arthur H. Harper (1955–2017), American businessman
- Arthur M. Harper, United States Army general.
- Arthur Harper (musician) (1939–2004), jazz musician
