= Nehemiah Hawkins =

American publisher, author (1833–1928)

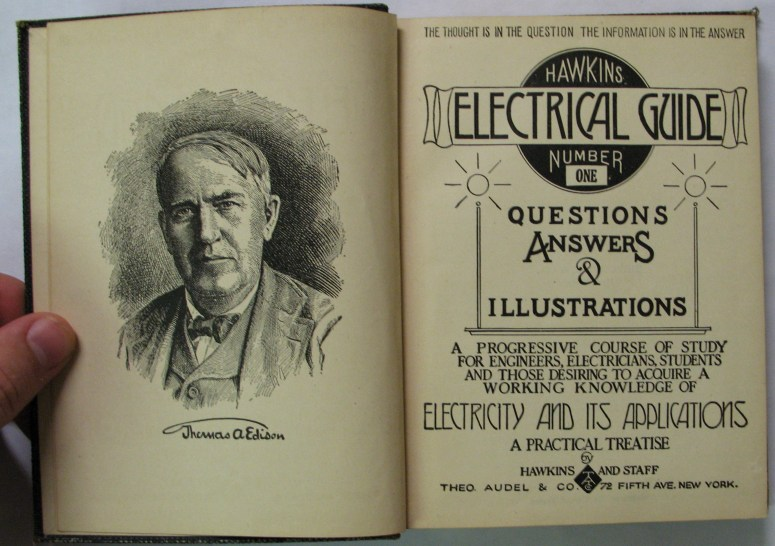

Nehemiah Hawkins (1833 – January 15, 1928) was an American publisher and author born in Providence, Rhode Island. He started working with the G&C Merriam Company of Springfield, MA. In Chicago he established a magazine called Steam, soon sold and incorporated into Power, then moved to New York.

He wrote (or commissioned and published under his own name) many of the Audels Guides, for use by engineers and craftsmen. While the books, credited to Hawkins, were published by Theodore Audel & Company of New York, Theodore Audel was a pseudonym used by Hawkins, the actual publisher of his own writings. As an author, he also sometimes used the pseudonym William Rogers, whose works were also published by his Theodore Audel & Company; the pen name is a likely reference to his ancestor, Roger Williams, who founded the British Colony of Rhode Island and Providence Plantations in present day Rhode Island.

The content of his books published prior to 1923 is now in the Public Domain.

== Works in part or whole by N. Hawkins ==
In order by year, though years may not be first editions.

- Handbook of Calculations for Engineers and Firemen. 1889.
- Maxims and instructions for the boiler room. T. Audel, 1891.
- Aids to Engineers' Examinations. 1894.
- New catechism of electricity: a practical treatise. T. Audel & Co., 1897.
- New catechism of the steam engine: with chapters on gas, oil and hot air engines. Theo. Audel, 1898 (copyright 1897; reprinted 1900, 1904.)
- Hawkins Indicator Catechism. A Practical Treatise for the Use of Erecting and Operating Engineers, Superintendents, Students of Steam Engineering, Etc. T. Audel, 1899.
- Aids to engineers' examinations: Prepared for applicants of all grades, with questions and answers. A summary of the principles and practice of steam engineering. T. Audel, 1901.
- Self-Help Mechanical Drawing for home study. T. Audel, 1902.
- The progressive machinist: a practical and educational treatise, with illustrations. T. Audel, 1903. (Alternate title: 'The Advance Machinist'.)
- Hawkins' mechanical dictionary: a cyclopedia of words, terms, phrases and data used in the mechanic arts, trades and sciences. T. Audel, 1909.
- Hawkins' electrical dictionary: a cyclopedia of words, terms, phrases and data used in the electric arts, trades and sciences. Audel, 1910.
- Hawkins Electrical Guide: Alternating currents and alternators. T. Audel, 1914.
- Hawkins and Staff. Hawkins Electrical Guide Number One. New York: Theo. Audel, 1917.
- Hawkins, Theodore Lucas, Frank Duncan Graham. Audels new marine engineers guide: a practical treatise on marine engines, boilers and auxiliary machinery..... Theo. Audel, 1918.
- Hawkins, Edwin P. Anderson. Audels mechanical dictionary for technical trades, arts and sciences: defining 17000 words, terms, phrases, formulas, rules. Theo. Audel, 1942.

As William Rogers:

- Rogers, William. The Advanced Machinist: A Practical and Educational Treatise, with Illustrations T. Audel, 1903.
- Rogers, William. Pumps and hydraulics, Part 1. T. Audel, 1905.
- Rogers, William. Pumps and hydraulics, Part 2. T. Audel, 1905.

== See also ==
- Hawkins Electrical Guide
- Frank D. Graham
