= Steven Allan Boggs =

American physicist (1946–2018)

- Born: March 15, 1946; Miami, Florida, U.S.
- Died: June 2, 2018 (aged 72); Columbia, Maryland, U.S.
- Education: Reed College (B.A.); University of Toronto (Ph.D., M.B.A.)
- Awards: IEEE Herman Halperin Electric Transmission and Distribution Award (2019)
- Scientific career
- Fields: Physics, dielectrics, electrical insulation
- Workplaces: Ontario Hydro; Underground Systems Inc. University of Connecticut
- Doctoral advisor: Harry L. Welsh

Steven Allan Boggs (March 15, 1946 – June 2, 2018) was an American physicist in the field of dielectrics and electrical insulation. He was a researcher in industry before becoming a tenured research professor at University of Connecticut from 1993 to 2013.

== Early life and education ==
Boggs was born on March 15, 1946, in Miami and raised around Portland, Oregon. His father was a professor of English. Boggs attended Lake Oswego High School and completed a B.A. in physics from Reed College in 1968. He completed an undergraduate thesis titled The Covariant Presentation of a Postulatory Approach to Electromagnetism with advisor Dennis G. Hoffman. Boggs earned a Ph.D. in physics in 1972 at University of Toronto. His doctoral advisor was Harry L. Welsh. He was a postdoctoral fellow at the Canada Centre for Remote Sensing.

== Career ==
Boggs was a researcher in the field of dielectrics and electrical insulation. He worked at Ontario Hydro from 1975 to 1987. He worked on the nature and measurement of partial discharge "in the ultra-high frequency range in gas-insulated substation and rotating machines. He also researched electric and water trees and developed methods to measure thermal impedance in "transmission-class power cables." He worked on a team with Frank Chu, Nobby Fujimoto, and Sil Rizzetto. His boss was Gary Ford. He completed a M.B.A. at University of Toronto in 1987. In February 1987, Boggs became the director of engineering and research at Underground Systems Incorporated (USi). He served as the vice president of the USi subsidiary, Chicago Condenser Corporation.

In 1993, Boggs became a tenured research professor at University of Connecticut (UConn). He served as the director of the Electrical Insulation Research Center at the Institute of Materials Science and held a joint appointment with the graduate programs in electrical engineering, physics, and materials science. He supervised over 20 students, with half of them being female. Boggs was a proponent of gender equality in STEM. He retired from UConn in September 2013. After retirement, he worked for his consulting company, NonLinear Systems Inc.

== Personal life ==
Boggs was married to fellow Reed College alumna Joan Raymond; they later divorced. He died on June 2, 2018, in Columbia, Maryland due to inoperable brain cancer.

== Awards and honors ==
Boggs was a fellow of the Institute of Electrical and Electronics Engineers and the recipient of the 2019 IEEE Herman Halperin Electric Transmission and Distribution Award.
