= IEEE Herman Halperin Electric Transmission and Distribution Award =

Power engineering award

- Awarded for: outstanding contributions to electric transmission and distribution
- Sponsored by: Institute of Electrical and Electronics Engineers
- First award: 1986
- Website: IEEE Herman Halperin Electric Transmission and Distribution Award

The IEEE Herman Halperin Electric Transmission and Distribution Award is a Technical Field Award of the IEEE that is presented for outstanding contributions to electric transmission and distribution. The award may be presented annually to an individual or a team of up to three people. It was instituted by the IEEE Board of Directors in 1986.

Prior to 1987, the award was called the William M. Habirshaw Award. Starting in 1987, the award became renamed in honor of Herman Halperin, who had been a recipient of the Habirshaw Award in 1962 and had worked for 40 years for the Commonwealth Edison Company. The award is sponsored by the Robert and Ruth Halperin Foundation, in memory of Herman and Edna Halperin, and the IEEE Power and Energy Society. The funds for the award were contributed by the Halperins, and are administered by the IEEE Foundation.

Recipients of this award receive a certificate and honorarium.

== Recipients ==
- 1987: Robert F. Lawrence
- 1988: Luigi Paris
- 1989: John J. Daugherty
- 1990: John A. Casazza
- 1991: John G. Anderson
- 1992: Andrew R. Hileman
- 1993: Mat Darveniza
- 1994: Abdel-Aziz A Fouad
- 1995: Vernon L. Chartier
- 1996: Farouk A. M. Rizk
- 1997: B. Don Russell
- 1998: Vincent T. Morgan
- 1999: Charles L. Wagner
- 2000: Arun G. Phadke
- 2001: Arthur C. Westrom
- 2002: John J. Vithayathil
- 2003: Sarma Maruvada
- 2004: Andrew J. Eriksson
- 2005: James J. Burke
- 2006: Anjan Bose
- 2007: Eric B. Forsyth
- 2008: Robert C. Degeneff
- 2009: Carson W. Taylor
- 2010: Carlos Katz
- 2011: John H. Brunke
- 2012: Michel Duval
- 2013: Vijay Vittal
- 2014: Willem Boone
- 2015: Wolfram Boeck
- 2016: George Anders
- 2017: George Dorwart Rockefeller
- 2018: Jinliang He
- 2019: Steven A. Boggs
- 2020: Dusan Povh
- 2021: Brian Stott
