= William M. Habirshaw Award =

Power engineering award

The William M. Habirshaw Award was an award given by the IEEE and, prior to the formation of the IEEE in 1963, by its predecessor the AIEE, from 1959 through 1986 for outstanding contributions to the field of electric transmission and distribution. Starting in 1987, the award was renamed as the IEEE Herman Halperin Electric Transmission and Distribution Award. Herman Halperin had been a recipient of the Habirshaw Award in 1962 and had worked for 40 years for the Commonwealth Edison Company.

== Winners ==
1963- Lawrence Marshall Robertson
