= Carlos Katz =

American electrical engineer (born 1934)

Carlos Katz (born 18 August 1934) is an American electrical engineer, researcher and the recipient of the 2010 IEEE award. His area of research is the properties and methods of manufacture of extruded and laminar dielectric high voltage power cables, and extension of service life of installed cables. He has written papers about the effects of water treeing on the life of cable installations.

== Early life and education ==
Katz was born in Nentershausen, Germany. He received an Electrical Engineering degree from Polytechnic Institute of Quito, Ecuador in 1961 and a MS degree from Stevens Institute of Technology, Hoboken, New Jersey in 1970.

== Career ==
From 1962 to 1971 Katz worked at General Cable Corporation Research Center and from 1971 to 1974 at the laboratories of Phelps Dodge Wire & Cable. In 1974 he became Assistant Director of R&D at General Cable Corp., and later Technical Director Power and Control Cables for General Cable International. He has been with Cable Technology Laboratories as Chief Research Engineer since its founding 1978.

Katz is the recipient of 2010 IEEE Herman Halperin award for his research on moisture prevention in power cables that has extended product life and saved utility companies substantial money worldwide.

An IEEE Fellow, Katz holds 16 U.S. patents has published over 40 technical papers and has contributed to numerous industry reports.
