= Frank D. Graham =

American technical writer (1875–1965)

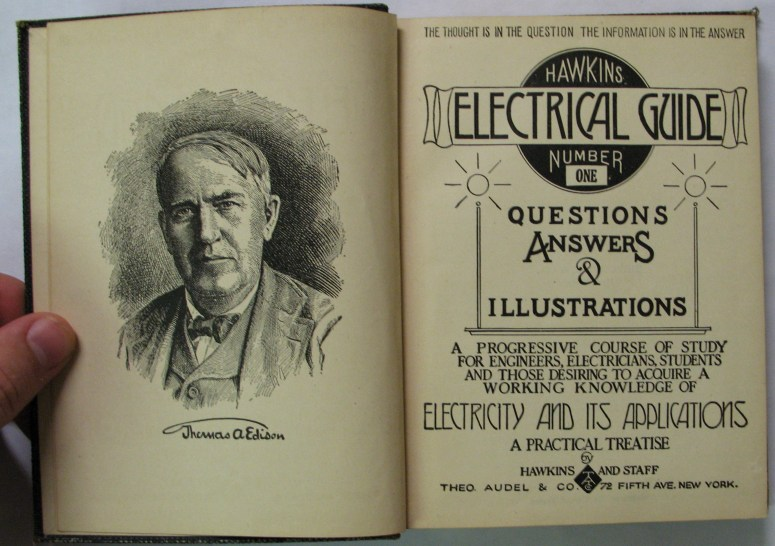
The 1917 Hawkins Electrical Guide, published by Theo. Audel and Co.

Frank Duncan Graham (1875–1965) was a prolific and eloquent writer of Audel's guides. Graham seemed to specialize in subjects related to steam engines and other types of engines.

== Early life ==
He was born Aug. 16, 1875 at Talledega Springs, Ala., the family seat, and later moved to Montgomery.

Graham was a graduate of Princeton University, with a BS and MS in Mechanical Engineering and a licensed marine and stationary engineer with the Stevens Institute of Technology, New Jersey. After graduating with a B.S. degree, Frank continued his studies in steam engineering at Stevens Institute where he graduated in 1902. He secured his M.S. degree at Princeton in 1903. .

His musical background was responsible for an early start on his career as a musician. Among his several teachers he was especially impressed with organist and choirmaster, Bruno Oscar Klein of St. Xavier Church, New York City. The class ode played by a band at commencement was one of his compositions

== Career ==
Graham's more epic works include his eight-volume Audel's Engineers and Mechanics Guide, 1921, which covered subjects as diverse as flying "aeroplanes", steam engines, and house wiring. The 12 volume Audel's New Electric Library, 1929, covered practically all that was known about electricity.

Other Audel books by Graham include: Audel's Handy Book of Practical Electricity, Audel's Power Plant Engineer's Guide, Audel's House Heating Guide, and Audel's Machinists & Tool Makers Handy Book.

Graham's residence was near Sea Bright, New Jersey, on a farm sometimes referred to in his works as "Stornoway". Graham built two steam powered yachts as demonstrators of his theories on steam plant construction and management, the Stornoway and Stornoway II. It is not known whether either of these vessels survive.

During his career as organist and choirmaster in several churches, one incident stands out in his recollections. He had applied for a try-out for the position as organist in the First Presbyterian Church, Morristown, N.J. When he arrived found a large audience instead of only members of the Music Committee. A notice in a local newspaper stating that Frank would present a recital was responsible. With characteristic energy and confidence, he gave a full program, including Bach's G Minor Mass, all from memory.

His list of compositions is extensive, consisting of songs, as well as piano, violin, and organ pieces. His anthems were published by Oliver Ditson, and were popular in many churches. While playing in the Sea Bright Presbyterian Chapel, he composed a setting for the hymn 'The Shadows of the Evening Hour' at the request of Janetta McCook, a niece of Charles Alexander, donor of Princeton's Alexander Hall.

He felt that his masterpiece was a symphonic tone poem scored for orchestra, organ, harp, and chorus, called 'Meditations after Lamartine.' Following the death of his first wife, Myrtle Wetmore Stumm, he married Louise Fuetterer on Oct. 12, 1935.

== Legacy ==
Princeton Alumni Weekly Volume 66, number 22 (April 19, 1966) page 17: "MEMORIALS—FRANK DUNCAN GRAHAM '99—One of our truly southern members, Frank Graham, died on Nov. 24, 1965 in Long Branch, N.J.

Frank's engineering courses were the inspiration for 50 or more books used in many institutions. Recognition for these original works, earned a degree, Doctor of Thermatics and Hydraulics from the Montgomery Alabama State Chamber of Commerce.

One of his favorite accomplishments was the discovery of a mistake in the calculation of the external latent heat-evaporation in the steam table. His chief peeve was literary thieves using his published material without his permission or crediting him.
