= Peter Zampardi =

American microwave engineer

- Education: Stevens Institute of Technology; California Institute of Technology; University of California, Los Angeles
- Occupation: Microwave engineer

Peter Zampardi is an American microwave engineer. He was named a fellow of the Institute of Electrical and Electronics Engineers, "for contributions to analysis, modeling and design of heterojunction bipolar transistors and circuits".
