= Herbert Merrick =

American inventor

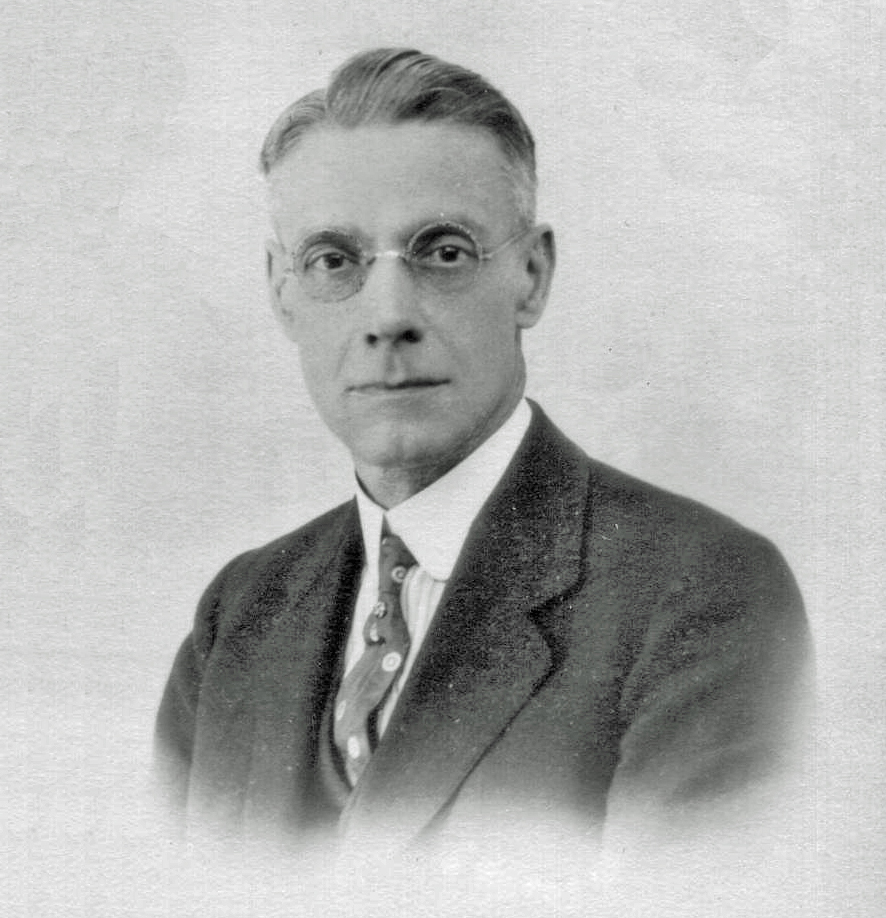
- Portrait of Herbert Merrick
- Born: Herbert Lansing Merrick; April 16, 1873; Brooklyn, New York, US
- Died: May 2, 1938 (aged 65); Passaic, New Jersey, US
- Education: Stevens Institute of Technology
- Occupations: Engineer; inventor; entrepreneur
- Known for: Beltweigher
- Political party: Republican
- Spouse: Katherine Selleck (m. 1898)
- Children: Alice E. Merrick
- Parent(s): Charles Merrick; Anna Marie Pinkham
- Relatives: Henry P. Merrick (brother); Arthur Merrick (brother)

Signature
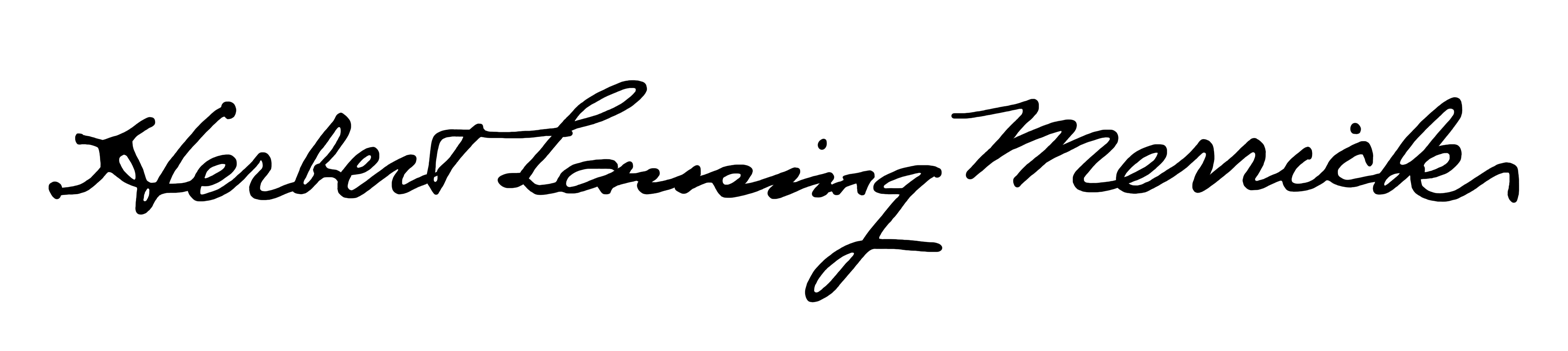

Herbert Lansing Merrick (April 16, 1873 – May 2, 1938) was an American engineer, inventor, and entrepreneur. He invented the first beltweighers, which automatically weigh bulk materials as they are passed along a conveyor belt without stoppage.

== Early life and education ==
Merrick was born in Brooklyn, New York, on April 16, 1873, to Anna Marie Pinkham and Charles Merrick, a businessman in New York City. Herbert Merrick had two brothers, Henry P. and Arthur, who died in infancy. He attended Bergen County public schools before graduating from Stevens Institute of Technology in 1892 with a Mechanical Engineering degree. After graduation he would work as an engineer and draftsman at various companies before starting his own manufacturing company.

== Career ==
Intrigued by the need for simple conveyor scales that can accurately record weight, Merrick sought to invent a device that could fulfill that demand. In 1907, he designed an experimental conveyor scale called the 'Conveyor Weightometer' for Fraser & Chalmers, Ltd., who introduced the new device at a mining machinery exhibition in London the next year. After examinations and tests by British government officials, the Weightometer was issued a certificate of allowance for use as a legal weighing instrument in trade.

Later in 1908, Merrick would rent a shop in Passaic, NJ, and immediately begin work on manufacturing the first Weightometers. Due to increased demand, Merrick expanded his factory in 1911 and incorporated his new business under the name Merrick Scale Manufacturing Company. Merrick's company is still in operation today under the name Merrick Industries, Inc., located in Florida, USA.

== Personal life ==
In 1898, Merrick married Katherine Selleck. They had one daughter together named Alice. A member of the Republican Party, Merrick was active in politics. He was also a member of the First Reformed Church of Passaic and director of the People's Bank and Trust Company. He was an avid sailor and owned the 'Kathal,' a cruiser named after his wife and daughter. On May 2, 1938, Herbert Merrick died at his home after a long illness. He was 65 years old.
