= Edwin J. Hess =

American business executive (1933–2023)

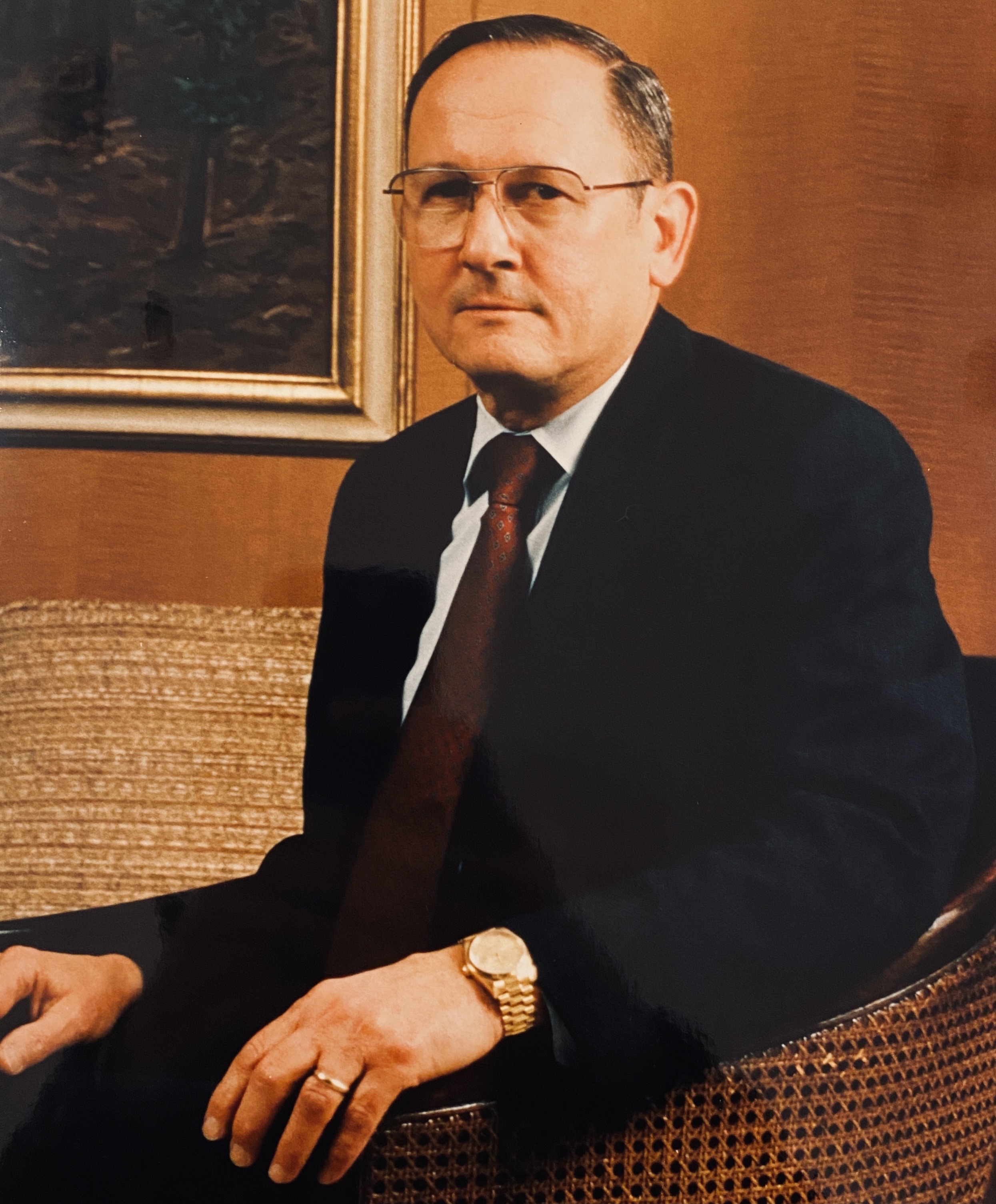
- Born: November 9, 1933; Newark, New Jersey, U.S.
- Died: March 25, 2023 (aged 89); Houston, Texas, U.S.
- Education: Stevens Institute of Technology; Harvard Business School
- Occupations: Former Senior Vice President, Management Committee, Exxon
- Years active: 1957–1998
- Employer: Exxon Corporation
- Notable work: Created ExxonMobil's Operations Integrity Management System and headed Exxon’s environmental and safety initiatives
- Political party: Republican
- Board member of: Member committee Edwin A. Stevens Society; trustee Stevens Institute of Technology, Committee for Economic Development, The Science Place, Dallas; chairman board directors National Action Council for Minorities in Engineering; board of directors Junior Achievement Dallas, Inc.; trustee, member executive committee U.S. Council for International Business, Harvard Business School Executive Council member
- Spouse: Barbara Hess
- Children: Susan, Cheryl, Nancy, Cynthia, and Edwin Jr.

Edwin John Hess (November 9, 1933 – March 25, 2023) was an American businessman who was Senior Vice President, and a Management Committee Member at Exxon from 1993 to 1998. He had previously been the Vice President of Environment and Safety since 1990 and joined the company in 1957.

While at Exxon, the board appointed Hess, a veteran executive, as the first corporate vice president for environment and safety, the first time it elevated environmental concerns to the senior executive level. The new position, created in the wake of Exxon's oil spill in the Arthur Kill off Staten Island, allowed Hess to supervise environmental and safety activities all across the corporation. Until Hess's appointment, environmental and safety issues had been dealt with at lower levels. Hess reported directly to Exxon's president, Lee R. Raymond.

== Early life and education ==
Edwin Hess was born in Newark, New Jersey on November 9, 1933. Hess received a bachelor's degree in mechanical engineering from Stevens Institute of Technology in 1955 where he was class president and top of his class. Hess went on to earn his master's degree in business administration from Harvard University in 1957. He was awarded the Alumni Achievement award from Stevens Institute of technology in 1980, Stevens Honor Award for 1993, and the Stevens Renaissance Engineering and Science Award for 1996.

== Career ==
Hess began working for Exxon in 1957. Upon his Harvard graduation, Hess joined the Exxon-predecessor's policy-level management development system placing him on the corporate fast-track system. Hess joined Exxon Company, USA in 1957, at the companies Bayway Refinery in Linden, New Jersey. Hess moved to Houston in 1961 in various capacities in the marketing, refining, supply and production areas of the oil business. In 1974, he became deputy manager of the corporation's public affairs department in New York City. He returned to Houston in 1978, as vice president of marketing for Exxon Company, USA and in 1981, he was named as senior vice president. Ed Hess was appointed executive vice president of the corporation's worldwide supply in transportation organization in 1985. He was the leader named senior vice president of marketing, refining and planning for Exxon Company, International, which coordinates the corporations oil and gas operations outside of the United States. In January 1990, Hess became Vice President of Environment and Safety for Exxon Corporation and was responsible for developing, reviewing and coordinating corporations worldwide environmental and safety plans. He was the first to hold his newly created position. In 1993, Ed Hess went on to occupy the position of Senior Vice President while serving on Exxon's Management Committee placing him as the second in command for the Exxon Corporation. The board elected Hess as senior V.P. of Exxon corporate, and a member of its five-person management committee comprising the CEO/board chairman and four senior V.P.s. That committee acting as a team, convened several times each week orchestrating at policy level the people, resources, processes, and performance of the world-wide $438 billion business. Hess was appointed the responsibility of leading the move and construction of Exxon's New York headquarters to Irving, Texas.

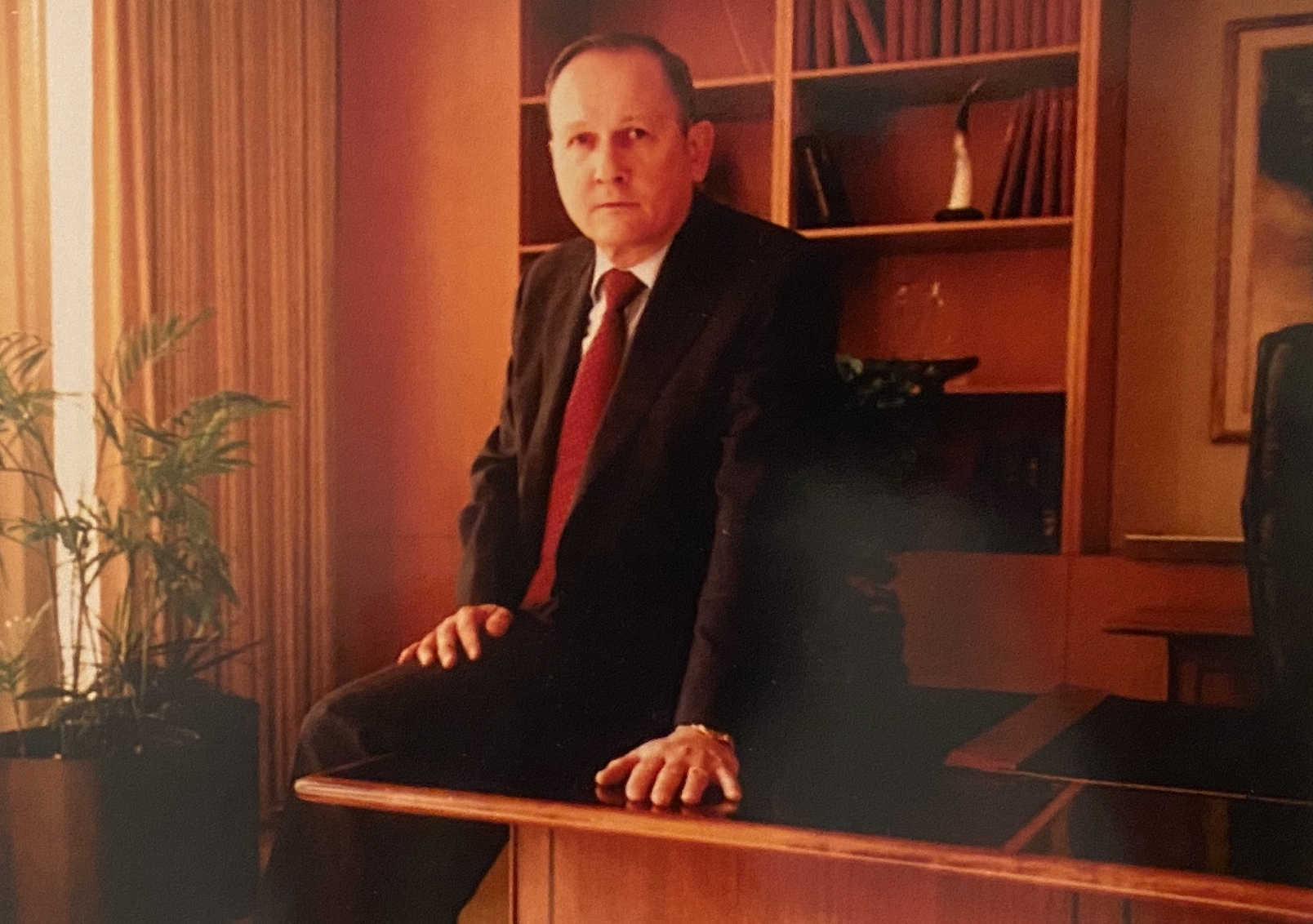
Hess in his office, inside Exxon's executive wing, also known as the "God Pod"

Hess says his proudest accomplishment at Exxon was while serving as Vice President of Environment and Safety, developing Exxon's Operations Integrity Management System (OIMS), which is still criticality used at ExxonMobil today. Ed Hess was chairman of the board of directors of the National Action Council for Minorities in Engineering (NACME), served on the Harvard Business School's Executive Council, a member of the American Petroleum Institute, the board of trustees of Stevens Institute of Technology, the Stevens Institute Edwin A. Stevens Society Committee, the board of trustees of The Science Place, the board of trustees and executive committee of the United States Counsel for International Business, and the board of directors of Junior Achievement of Dallas, Inc.

== Death ==
Hess died in Houston, Texas on March 25, 2023, at the age of 89.

== Awards and honors ==
- 1980 Alumni Achievement Award from Stevens Institute of Technology
- 1993 Stevens Honor Award
- 1996 The Stevens Renaissance Engineering and Science Award for 1996
- 2007 Stevens Institute of Technology Hall of Achievement Award for sustained and meritorious contributions in mechanical engineering
