= Pál Lipták =

Pál Lipták (14 February 1914 – 6 July 2000) was a Hungarian anthropologist. He specialized in historical anthropology and Hungarian ethnogenesis. Based on examinations of skeletons, he improved the method of anthropotaxonomical differential diagnosis for Europids and Mongolids. He was a member of the Hungarian Academy of Sciences.

== Life ==
Lipták was born on 14 February 1914 in Békéscsaba. Between 1932 and 1937, he studied and graduated at Pázmány Péter University in Budapest, gaining a teacher's degree. One year later he received a Doctorate in arts, the dissertation was called "The geography of Békéscsaba". Between 1938 and 1939 he taught at a teacher training college at Miskolc. After that, he joined the army for a two-year compulsory military service. After his military service he taught at the public Teachers' College in Budapest till 1943. One year later he was elected teacher in „Fasori” Secondary School in Budapest.

In 1944 he joined the army and was captured by Soviet troops for four years. Thereupon he taught at the successor of "Fasori" Secondary School in Budapest for one year (1948–1949). From summer 1949 till 1960, he worked as a scientific official at the Department of Anthropology Hungarian Natural History Museum in Budapest. During this period of time, in 1956, he became Candidate of Biological Sciences by defending his thesis "The major questions of anthropology in the territory between the Danube and the Tisza rivers between the 8th and 13th centuries AD". Consequently, he was member of the editorial board of "Anthropologiai közlemények" between 1957 and 1992. Between 1958 and 1962, he was a member of the Anthropological Theme Committee of the Hungarian Academy of Sciences. In 1960, he was also appointed to head of the Department of Anthropology at József Attila University in Szeged and worked there till 1980. He was a member of the Anthropological Committee of the Hungarian Academy of Sciences from 1962 to 1985. In 1969 he defended his doctoral thesis: „The anthropology of Hungarian ethnogenesis”. Afterwards he was also editor-in-chief of Acta Biologica Szegediensis from 1975 to 1980.

In 1980, he finally retired. Nine years later, in 1989, he was awarded the "Lajos Bartucz Commemorative Medal". In 1994, he was awarded the title of "professor emeritus" by József Attila University, in Szeged. Lipták died on 6 July 2000 in Budapest.

== Bibliography ==
- (1938): Békéscsaba földrajza. [Geography of Békéscsaba (Békés county, Hungary)] – Békéscsaba: Petőfi Nyomda, 45+[3] pp.
- (1950): Materially po kraniologii hantov. (Étude anthropologique des crânes ostiaks). – Acta Ethnographica Academiae Scientiarum Hungaricae 1: 197–230.
- (1951): Anthroplogische Beiträge zum problem der Ethnogenesis der Altungarn. – Acta Archeologica Academiae Scientiarum Hungaricae 1: 231–249.
- (1951): Étude anthropologique du cimetière avare d'Áporkai-Ürbőpuszta (commune de Bugyi). – Annales Historico-naturales Musei Nationalis Hungarici 1(1): 232–259.
- (1953): New Hungarian skeletal remains of the 10th century from the Danube-Tisza Plain. – Annales Historico-naturales Musei Nationalis Hungarici 3(1952): 277–287.
- (1953): Az Ivádi embertani kutatások I. Előzetes közlemény. [Anthropological research of Ivád (Heves county, Hungary. Preliminary notice] – MTA Biológiai Osztályának Közleményei 2(2-3): 137–139. Co-authors: Acsádi, György – Csizmadia, Andor – Nemeskéri, János – Tarnóczy, Tamás.
- (1953): Ivád és környéke. [Ivád and its countryside] – MTA Biológiai Osztályának Közleményei 2(2-3): 140–146.
- (1954): La population de la région de Nógrád au Moyen Âge. – Acta Ethnographica Academiae Scientiarum Hungaricae 3(1-4)(1953): 289–338.
- (1954): Le cimetière du XIe siècle de Kérpuszta. I. La description des décourvertes. – Acta Archaelogica Academiae Scientiarum Hungaricae 3: 205–279. Co-authors: Nemeskéri, János - Szőke, Béla.
- (1954): Le cimetière du XIe siècle de Kérpuszta. III. L'analyse typologique de la population de Kérpuszta au Moyen Age. – ActA Archaelogica Academiae Scientiarum Hungaricae 3: 303–370.
- (1954): A típusok eloszlása Kiskunfélegyháza környékének XII. századi népességében. (Répartition des types anthropologiques de la population des environs de Kiskunfélegyháza du XII. siècle). – Biológiai közlemények. Pars anthropologica 1(1-2): 105–120.
- (1954): An anthropological Survey of Magyar Prehistory. – Acta Linguistica Academiae Scientiarum Hungaricae 4(1-2): 133–170.
- (1954): Jankó János vizsgálatai a Közép-Ob melléki chantik között. (J. Jankó's investigations among the Chantis of the Middle Ob River). – Nyelvtudományi közlemények 56: 97–116.
- (1954): Kecel-környéki avarok. [Avars regionary Kecel (Bács-Kiskun county, Hungary] – Biológiai közlemények. Pars anthropologica 2(1-2): 159–180.
- (1955): Recherches anthropologiques sur les ossements Avares des environs d'Üllő. – Acta Archaeologica Academiae Scientiarum Hungaricae 6: 231–316.
- (1955): Zur Frage der antropologischen Beziehungen zwischen dem mittleren Donaubecken und Mittelasien. – Acta Orientalia Hungarica 5(3): 271–312.
- (1955): A Duna-Tisza köze antropológiájának főbb kérdései a 8–13. században. Kandidátusi értekezés. (Questions essentielles de l’anthropologie de la région s’étendant entre le Danube et la Tisza, du VIIIe au XIIIe siècle. Dissertation de candidature). – Budapest: Tudományos Minősítő Bizottság, 235 pp.
- (1956): Nouvelles contributions a l'anthropologie de l'époque avare entre le Danube et la Tisza. – Crania hungarica 1(1): 13–16.
- (1956): La bibliographie de l'anthropologie historique en Hongrie 1946–1955. – Crania hungarica 1(1): 33–36. Co-authors: Nemeskéri, János.
- (1956): Contributions à l'anthropologie des temps avars de la région de Kiskőrös. – Crania hungarica 1(2): 47–52.
- (1957): Söstojanie na ungarskata antropologija. – Priroda (Szofia) 6(2): 95–97. [Bolgár nyelven, In Bulgarian].
- (1957): Homokmégy-Halom avarkori népessége. (La population de Homokmégy-Halom dans l'époque des Avars). – Anthropológiai közlemények 4(2)(1956): 25–42.
- (1958): Awaren und Magyaren im Donau-Theiss Zwischenstromgebiet. – Acta Archaelogica Academiae Scientiarum Hungaricae 8(1957): 199–268.
- (1958): Adatok a Duna-Tisza közi bronzkor antropológiájához. [Data to the anthropology of Duna-Tisza Bronze Age] – Anthropologiai közlemények 1(1-2): 3–16.
- (1958): Beszámoló bulgáriai tanulmányutamról. [Report on Bulgarian study trip] – Anthropologiai közlemények 1(1-2): 57–59.
- (1958): A mai lengyel antropológia. (Beszámoló 1958. évi lengyelországi tanulmányutamról). [About present Polish anthropology. Report on Polish study trip in the year of 1958] – Anthropologiai közlemények 2(1-2): 57–61.
- (1959): Anthropologische Funde von Ócsa aus der Sarmatenzeit. – Folia Archaeologica 11: 91–94.
- (1959): Beszámoló a csehszlovák antropológusok 1959. évi konferenciájáról. [Report on conference of Czecho-Slovak anthropologists in the year of 1959.] – Antropologiai közlemények 3(3-4): 141–144.
- (1959): Embertan és történeti embertan. [Anthropology and historical anthropology] – Antropologiai közlemények 3(3-4): 111–120.
- (1959): Stan badań antropologicznych na węgrzech. – Przegład Antropologiczny 25: 265–272.
- (1959): The „Avar Period” mongoloids in Hungary. – Acta Archaeologica Academiae Scientiarum Hungaricae 10: 251–279.
- (1960): Über die Bedeutung taxonomischer Forschungen in der Anthropologie. – In: Actes du 6^{e} Congrès International des Sciences Anthropologiques et Ethnologiques, Paris Tome 1., p. 211–213.

(...)
