= Beltweigher =

A beltweigher or belt weigher, more commonly known as a belt scale, is a piece of industrial control equipment used to measure the mass and flow rate of bulk material traveling over a conveyor belt. Invented by Herbert Merrick in the early 1900's, belt weighers are commonly used in plants and heavy industries, such as mining.

Belt weighers replace a short section of the support mechanism of the belt, which might be one or more sets of idler rollers, or a short section of channel or plate. This weighed support is mounted on load cells, either pivoted, counterbalanced or not, or fully suspended. The mass measured by the load cells is integrated with the belt speed to compute the mass of material moving on the belt, after allowing for the mass of the belt itself. Belt weighers generally include the necessary electronics to perform this calculation, often in the form of a small industrialized microprocessor system.

A belt weigher is normally mounted in a well supported straight section of belt, with no vertical or sideways curvature, and as close to level as is practicable. The weighed support must be aligned vertically and horizontally with the adjacent supports to avoid tensile forces in the belt skewing the measurement. Due to the belt tension variation, frequent check calibration must be done.

Outputs from belt weighers are typically:

- pulses at predefined increments of mass
- an analogue signal proportional to the flow rate

Some belt weigher controllers offer features such as driving output to stop the belt when a predefined mass of material has been measured, or a range of alarms to indicate nil flow, belt slippage, and belt stoppage.
