= Ľubomír Lipták =

Slovak historian (1930–2000)

Ľubomír Lipták (1930 – 2003) was a Slovak historian.
