= Arthur H. Harper =

American businessman (1955–2017)

Arthur Henry Harper (December 3, 1955 - September 19, 2017) was an American businessman. He died on 19 September 2017.

== Biography ==
Arthur Henry Harper was born in Trenton, New Jersey on December 3, 1955 to Joseph and Eleanor Graham Harper.

=== Early life ===
He received a Bachelor of Science in Chemical Engineering from the Stevens Institute of Technology in Hoboken, New Jersey in 1978.

=== Career ===
He served as Executive Vice President of GE Capital Services from 2001 to 2002, and as President and Chief Executive Officer of the Equipment Services Division of General Electric from 2002 to 2005.

He founded GenNx360 Capital Partners, a private equity firm, in January 2006. He sat on the Board of Directors of Monsanto and the Gannett Company.
