= Béla G. Lipták =

Béla G. Lipták (born June 7, 1936, in Hungary) is a Hungarian engineer consultant specializing in the fields of safety, automation, process control, optimization and renewable energy. He is the editor-in-chief of the Instrument and Automation Engineer's Handbook. His handbook and other works in the field of automation have become important in the automation field.

== Biography ==
Lipták was born in Hungary on June 7, 1936. He entered the United States as a refugee of the Hungarian Revolution of 1956.

=== Education ===
Lipták received a scholarship at the Stevens Institute of Technology (1959) and a master's degree from CCNY (1962). He also holds graduate courses in computer science at Pratt Institute (1965).

== Awards and honors ==
Béla G. Lipták is a Fellow Member (1973) of the International Society of Automation. He is also included in the Process Automation Hall of Fame by the Control Global media portal.
