= Hawkins (name) =

Origin
- Origin: forename Hawkin
- Meaning: son of Hawkin
- Region of origin: England; Ireland

Other names
- Variant forms: Hawking, Ó hEacháin, Mac Eacháin, Háicín, Håkan

Hawkins is an English surname.

== Etymology ==
According by FaNUK (Dictionary of Family Names in Britain and Ireland), the surname has three possible origins.

The most usual origin is the forename Hawkin with an original genitival -s (that is, "Hawkin's son") (or else it is Hawkin used as a surname with a later excrescent -s in the early modern period to bring it into line with the predominant style of hereditary surnames with such a genitival -s).

It is one of many personal names with the diminutive Middle English suffix -kin (originally from Low German or Dutch) added to a single-syllable hypocoristic form, such as Robert > Hob > Hopkin / Walter > Wat > Watkin / William > Will > Wilkin. The Middle English personal name Haw is a rhyming fond form of Raw, that is, Ralph.

Another possible origin is the placename Hawkinge, near Folkestone, in Kent, England. This was written as Hauekinge in 1204, based on Old English heafoc (hawk), or more likely this same word used as a personal name. A final 'ng' was (and is) simplified to 'n' in English generally; the final -s would be the excrescent -s added to the locative surname in the belief that it was the personal name Hawkin.

In Ireland, Hawkins may be the result of Anglicising a native surname: it was used as a substitute for Ó hEacháin ‘descendant of Eachán' (= little Eachaidh, i.e. a pet form of the personal name Eachaidh meaning ‘horseman’), as it had a vague similarity in sound to the Irish name.

In Scotland, the given name Eachann has two elements. The first element is each, meaning "horse". The second element is donn, which has been given two meanings. One proposed meaning is "brown"; the other is "lord". The early Gaelic form of the name, Eachdonn, was confused with the Norse Hakon. Hawkins and a derivative, Howkins, are a sept of Clan Stewart of Lennox and of Clan Guthrie.

In Scandinavia, we find the name Haakon, Hakon, and Håkon.

== People ==
=== A to D ===
- Adelaide Hawkins (1914–2008), American cryptologist
- Alex Hawkins (1937–2017), American football player and sportscaster
- Alexander Leroy Hawkins (1843–1899), American colonel
- Alfred Hawkins (footballer), (1904 – unknown) English association footballer
- Alice Hawkins (1863–1946), English suffragette
- Andy Hawkins (disambiguation), several people
- Annie Hawkins-Turner (born 1950s), American model
- Anthony Hawkins (1932–2013), Australian actor
- Armis E. Hawkins (1920–2006), Associate justice of the Supreme Court of Mississippi
- Sir Arthur Hawkins (1913-1999), English mechanical and electrical engineer
- Augustus Hawkins (1907–2007), American politician, author of the Humphrey-Hawkins Full Employment Act
- Barry Hawkins (born 1979), English snooker player
- Ben Hawkins (American football) (1944–2017), American football player
- Benjamin Hawkins (1754–1816), American farmer, statesman, and delegate to the Native American Creek people
- Brad Hawkins (disambiguation), multiple people
- Buddy Boy Hawkins, American country blues guitarist, singer, and songwriter
- Charlotte Hawkins (born 1975), English television and radio presenter, newsreader and journalist
- Chauncey Lamont Hawkins or Amir Junaid Muhadith (born 1975), American rapper, better known as Loon
- Chris Hawkins (born 1975), English DJ and radio presenter
- Chris Hawkins (American football) (born 1986)
- Christopher Hawkins (disambiguation), several people
- Clifford Frank Hawkins (1915–1991), British physician
- Coleman Hawkins (1904–1969), American jazz tenor saxophonist
- Coleman Hawkins (basketball) (born 2001), American basketball player
- Connie Hawkins (1942–2017), American basketball player
- Corey Hawkins (basketball) (born 1991), American basketball player
- C. R. Hawkins (1900–1959), American politician, Missouri senator
- Curt Hawkins (born 1985), American professional wrestler
- D. J. B. Hawkins (1906–1964), British philosopher and priest
- Dale Hawkins (1936–2010), American singer and songwriter
- Dan Hawkins, several people
- Darrell Hawkins (born 1969), American basketball coach and player
- David Hawkins (disambiguation), several people
- Dennis Hawkins (born 1947) English association footballer
- Donald Hawkins (born 1992), American football player

=== E to K ===
- Ed Hawkins (climatologist) (born 1977), British climate scientist and data visualization designer
- Edward Hawkins (1789–1882), English academic, Provost of Oriel College, Oxford
- Edward Hawkins (New York politician) (1829–1908), New York politician
- Edwin Hawkins (1943–2018), American singer and songwriter
- Erick Hawkins (1909–1994), American modern dancer
- Ernie Hawkins (born 1947), American blues guitarist and singer
- Erskine Hawkins (1914–1993), American trumpet player and big band leader
- Etta Hawkins (1865–1945), American stage actress
- Francis Hawkins, several people
- Frances Hawkins (1921–2001), American politician, member of the Nevada State Assembly
- Francesca Hawkins (fl. 1980s–2020s), Trinidadian television news presenter
- Geoffrey Hawkins (1895–1980), Royal Navy officer
- Georgann Hawkins (1955–1974), American murder victim of Ted Bundy
- George Hawkins (disambiguation), several people
- Gerald Hawkins (1928–2003), American-British astronomer
- Gerald Hawkins (politician) (1943–2015), American politician
- Greg Hawkins (fl. 1970s–2000s), American hedge-fund trader
- Gregory P. Hawkins (born 1957), American lawyer, speaker, and writer
- Hamilton S. Hawkins (1834–1910), American general
- Hamilton S. Hawkins III (1872–1950), American general
- Hawkshaw Hawkins (1921–1963), American country and western singer
- Henry Hawkins, 1st Baron Brampton (1817–1907), English judge
- Henry Hawkins (politician) (1790–1845), New York politician
- Hersey Hawkins (born 1966), American professional basketball player
- Howie Hawkins (born 1952), Green Party nominee in 2020 US presidential election
- Isabel Hawkins (born 1958), Argentine-American astronomer
- Jack Hawkins (disambiguation), several people
- James Hawkins (disambiguation), several people
- Javian Hawkins (born 1999), American football player
- Javontae Hawkins (born 1993), American basketball player
- Jaylinn Hawkins (born 1997), American football player
- Jeff Hawkins (born 1957), American scientist
- Jeffrey J. Hawkins (born 1966), American diplomat and ambassador
- Jennifer Hawkins (born 1983), Australian model and Miss Universe 2004
- Jim Hawkins (radio presenter) (born 1962), English radio presenter
- John Hawkins (disambiguation), several people
- Jonathan Hawkins (1983–2025), British chess grandmaster
- Joyce Hawkins (died 1992), English lexicographer and dictionary editor
- Julian Assange (né Hawkins; born 1971), Australian publisher and activist
- Justin Hawkins (born 1975), English rock musician
- Keith Hawkins (born 1967), English poker player
- Kevin Hawkins (speedway rider) (born 1954), English racecar driver
- Kyle Hawkins (born 1970), American lacrosse coach

=== L to R ===
- LaTroy Hawkins, (born 1972), American baseball player
- Margaret Hawkins (1877–1969), American teacher and activist
- Mary Ellen Hawkins (1923–2023), American politician
- Matt Hawkins (disambiguation), several people
- Michael Hawkins Jr. (born 2005), American football player
- Nehemiah Hawkins, (1833–1928), American writer and publisher
- Paul Hawkins (disambiguation), several people
- Paula Hawkins (politician) (1927–2009), American politician
- Paula Hawkins (author) (born 1972), British author
- Petri Hawkins-Byrd, bailiff "Byrd" on the Judge Judy TV series
- Rachel Hawkins (born 1992), Scottish cricketer
- Rachel Hawkins (writer) (born 1979), American author
- Rebecca Hawkins, American pioneer woman
- Richard Hawkins (disambiguation), several people
- Rob Hawkins (born 1983), English rugby union player
- Robert Hawkins (disambiguation), several people
- Roger Hawkins (disambiguation), several people
- Ronnie Hawkins (1935–2022), American rock singer and songwriter
- Rush Hawkins (1831–1920), American Civil War colonel and politician

=== S to Z ===
- Sally Hawkins (born 1976), British actress
- Screamin' Jay Hawkins (1929–2000), American singer and entertainer
- Simeon S. Hawkins (1827–1908), New York politician
- Sophie B. Hawkins (born 1967), American singer and songwriter
- Stewart J. Hawkins (born c. 1935), British scouting leader
- Stuart Hawkins (born 2006), American soccer player
- Taylor Hawkins (1972–2022), American musician
- Thomas Hawkins (disambiguation), several people called Thomas or Tom
- Tianna Hawkins (born 1991), American basketball player
- Tim Hawkins (born 1975), American Christian comedian
- Tre Hawkins (born 2000), American football player
- Walter Lincoln Hawkins (1911–1992), American scientist and inventor
- William Hawkins (disambiguation), several people
- Willis A. Hawkins (died 1886), justice of the Georgia Supreme Court
- Wynn Hawkins (1936–2021), American Major League Baseball pitcher
