= Hawkins =

Hawkins may refer to:

== Places ==
=== United States ===
- Hawkins, Idaho, an unincorporated community
- Hawkins Ranch, a historic ranch in Matagorda County, Texas
- Hawkins, Texas
- Hawkins, Wisconsin, a village
- Hawkins (town), Wisconsin, a town
- Hawkins Corner, Wisconsin, an unincorporated community
- Hawkins County, Tennessee

==== Fiction ====
- Hawkins, Indiana, setting of American science fiction horror drama television series Stranger Things

=== Elsewhere ===
- Hawkins, Alberta, a locality in Canada
- Hawkins, New Zealand

== People ==
- Hawkins (name), including a list of people with the surname

== Arts and entertainment ==
- Hawkins (TV series), an American TV series starring James Stewart as Billy Jim Hawkins
- D.L. Hawkins, a fictional character on the 2006 American TV series Heroes
- Helen Hawkins, main character of the TV series Siren
- Jim Hawkins (character), a fictional character in Robert Louis Stevenson's novel Treasure Island
- Robert Hawkins, a character on the 2006 American TV series Jericho
- Sadie Hawkins, an Al Capp character responsible for Sadie Hawkins Day

== Ships ==
- Hawkins-class cruiser, Royal Navy
  - HMS Hawkins (D86), Royal navy cruiser 1919-1947

== Other uses ==
- Hawkins Electrical Guide
- Hawkins grenade
- Hawkins Cookers

== See also ==
- Hawking (disambiguation)
- Hawkins House (disambiguation)
- Justice Hawkins (disambiguation)
