= Hawking (surname) =

Origin
- Meaning: "falconry"
- Region of origin: England

Other names
- Variant forms: Hawken, Hawkins

Hawking is an English language surname with origin from falconry. Variations include Hawken and Hawkins. Notable people with the surname include:

- Fred Hawking (1909–1988), Australian rules footballer
- George Hawking (1902–1968), Australian rules footballer
- Howard Hawking (born 1933), Australian rules footballer
- Jane Wilde Hawking (born 1944), first wife of Stephen Hawking
- Lucy Hawking (born 1970), English journalist and novelist
- Michael Hawking (b. 1952), Australian rules footballer
- Simon Hawking (born 1973), Australian rules footballer
- Stephen Hawking (1942–2018), British theoretical physicist
- Tom Hawking (1882–1952), Australian rules footballer
- The Hawking Brothers, Australian country music band including brothers Russell and Alan Hawking

Fictional characters:

- Jim Hawking, character from the anime series Outlaw Star
