= John Hawkins =

John Hawkins may refer to:

== Public officials ==
- John Hawkins (naval commander) (1532–1595), English admiral
- John Hawkins (17th century diplomat), ambassador of the Kingdom of England to France, 1626–1627
- John Hawkins (MP) (c. 1611–?), English politician
- John Hawkins (burgess), member of the Virginia House of Burgesses
- John Hawkins (Maryland politician), American politician
- John Heywood Hawkins (1802–1877), British politician
- John Parker Hawkins (1830–1914), U.S. Civil War brigadier general
- John Joseph Hawkins (1840–1916), politician in Ontario, Canada
- John A. Hawkins (New York politician) (1864–1941), New York politician
- John J. Hawkins (1855–1935), American jurist and politician in the Arizona Territory
- John Clifford Hawkins (1879–?), American lawyer and political figure
- John Hawkins (diplomat) (born 1960), British ambassador to Qatar
- John D. Hawkins (born 1968), South Carolina politician
- John Edgar Hawkins (1869–1944), Arkansas politician

== Writers ==
- John Hawkins (grammarian) (c. 1587–c. 1641), English physician, grammarian and translator
- John Hawkins (author) (1719–1789), English music historian
- John Sidney Hawkins (baptised 1758–1842), English antiquarian, son of the music historian
- John Hawkins (geologist) (1761–1841), English geologist and writer
- John A. Hawkins (linguist) (born 1950), English linguist

== Musicians ==
- John Bernard Hawkins (born 1949), English composer
- John Hawkins (Canadian composer) (1944–2007), Canadian classical composer
- Johnny Hawkins, music director and arranger, co-composer of 1964's Canterbury Tales
- Big Hawk, American rapper whose real name was John Hawkins (1969–2006)

== Other ==
- John Hawkins (archdeacon of Totnes) (1903–1965), Anglican priest
- John Hawkins (archdeacon of Hampstead) (born 1963)
- John Isaac Hawkins (1772–1855), engineer and inventor of the upright piano, a mechanical pencil and a letter copying machine (the polygraph)
- John Russell Hawkins (1862–1939), American professor and college president
- John Hawkins (athlete) (born 1949), Canadian high jumper
- John Hawkins (rower), Australian rower
- John Hawkins (rugby union) (born 1996), English rugby union player
- John Hawkins (Master of Pembroke College, Cambridge), Master of Pembroke College, Cambridge, 1728–1733
- TSS Sir John Hawkins, passenger tender vessel

== See also ==
- Jack Hawkins (disambiguation)
- John Hawkin, MP
- John Hawkins Hagarty (1816–1900), Canadian lawyer, teacher, and judge
