= Andrew Hawkins (disambiguation) =

Andrew Hawkins (born 1986) is an American football player.

Andrew or Andy Hawkins may also refer to:

- Andrew Hawkins (cricketer) (born 1967), English cricketer
- Andy Hawkins (born 1960), American baseball pitcher
- Andy Hawkins (American football) (born 1958), retired American football player
- Andy Hawkins (musician) (born 1960), American guitarist
- Andy Hawkins (music producer) (born 1977), British musician and record producer

== See also ==
- Hawkins (name)
