= James Hawkins =

James, Jim or Jimmy Hawkins may refer to:

== People ==
- James Hawkins (artist) (born 1954), English painter and filmmaker
- James Hawkins (bishop) (died 1807), Irish Anglican bishop
- James Hawkins (organist) (1662–1729), English organist and composer
- James Hawkins (United States Army officer), second lieutenant and field operations leader during the Vietnam War
- James Boyd Hawkins (1813–1896), American planter and rancher
- Jim Hawkins (radio presenter) (born 1962), BBC radio presenter
- Jim Hawkins (politician) (born 1949), American politician
- Jimmy Hawkins (born 1941), American actor and film producer

== Fictional characters ==
- Jim Hawkins (character), in Robert Louis Stevenson's novel Treasure Island

== See also ==
- James Hawkins-Whitshed (1762–1849), Royal Navy officer
- Jim Hawking
- Marshall Hawkins (basketball) (1924–2010), whose first name is legally James
