= Christopher Hawkins =

Christopher Hawkins may refer to:

- Sir Christopher Hawkins, 1st Baronet (1758–1829), Cornish landowner, mine-owner and politician, Member of Parliament
- Christopher Hawkins (cricketer) (1938–2022), English cricketer
- Christopher Hawkins (dancer), English ballroom dancer and teacher
- Christopher Hawkins (High Peak MP) (1937–2023), British economist and politician, Member of Parliament

== See also ==
- Chris Hawkins (born 1975), presenter
- Chris Hawkins (American football) (born 1986), American football cornerback
- Chris Hawkins (rugby union) (1945–2020), former Australian rugby union coach
