= Sir Thomas Hawkins =

17th century English poet and translator

Sir Thomas Hawkins (died c.1640) was an English poet and translator.

== Life ==
He was the eldest son of Sir Thomas Hawkins, knight-banneret, of Nash Court, Kent, by Anne, daughter and heiress of Cyriac Pettit, of Boughton-under-the-Blean in the same county. John Hawkins M.D., and Henry Hawkins the Jesuit, were his brothers. He succeeded to the family estates on the death of his father, 10 April 1617, and was knighted by James I at Whitehall Palace 4 May 1618.

Hawkins was a friend and correspondent of James Howell, who mentions him in the Epistolæ Ho-elianæ, and he was also acquainted with Edmund Bolton, who selected him in 1624 to be one of the original 84 members of his projected Royal Academy. Like all the members of his family, he was a staunch recusant. On 11 December 1633 an attempt was made under a council-warrant to search his house for Father Symons, a Carmelite friar, and others. Lady Hawkins would not admit the officers without a special warrant, saying that her husband had the great seal of England in his trunk to protect her house, and the matter seems to have dropped there.

Hawkins died at Nash Court, Kent, towards the close of 1640, and was buried near the graves of his father and mother.

== Works ==
Hawkins wrote:

- The Odes and Epodes of Horace in Latin and English Verse, London, 1625. The second edition was entitled ‘Odes of Horace, the best of Lyrick Poets; contayning much morallity and sweetness: Selected, translated, and in this edition reviewed and enlarged with many more, London, 1631, and again 1635 and 1638. This translation was plagiarised by Barten Holyday in 1652.
- An English translation of The Holy Court, or the Christian Institution of Men of Quality. With Examples of those who in Court haue flourished in Sanctity. 2 vols., Paris, 1626. It was by Nicolas Caussin of the Society of Jesus. The first volume was inscribed to Queen Henrietta Maria and the second to Edward Sackville, 4th Earl of Dorset. The third volume was not published in English till 1634, when vols. i. and ii. were reprinted at Rouen; a fourth volume followed in 1638, and contained The Command of Reason over the Passions. Other editions, London, 1638, 1650, 1663, and 1678. The later editions were probably prepared by Robert Codrington, who is said to have added translations of his own. Hawkins was assisted by Sir Basil Brooke. This work was popular for many years, especially among Catholics. It contains lives, with portraits, of Mary Queen of Scots and Cardinal Pole.
- An elegy on Sir John Beaumont, printed with Beaumont's Bosworth Field, 1629.
- Unhappy Prosperitie, expressed in the Histories of Ælius Sejanus and Philippa the Catanian, with observations on the fall of Sejanus, translated from the French of Pierre Matthieu, London, 1632, and 1639. Dedicated to William Cecil, 2nd Earl of Salisbury.
- Political Observations upon the Fall of Sejanus, 1634, translated from Giovanni Battista Manzini.
- The Cause of the Greatnesse of Cities, 1635, translated from Giovanni Botero.
- The Christian Diurnal of F. N. Caussin, S.J., translated into English by T. H., Paris, 1632; 3rd edition 1686; dedicated to Viscountess Savage. It differs slightly from The Christian Diary of F. N. Caussin, S.J., translated into English by T. H. [Cambridge], 1648, and 1649, which was issued for Protestant rather than Catholic use.
- The Lives and singular vertues of Saint Elzear, Count of Sabran, and of his Wife the blessed Countesse Delphina, both Virgins and Married, translated from the French of the Jesuit Étienne Binet, Paris, 1638; dedicated to John Talbot, 10th Earl of Shrewsbury and his countess.
- A poem in Ionsonus Virbivs: or the Memorie of Ben. Johnson, 1638.

== Family ==
Hawkins married Elizabeth, daughter of George Smith of Ashby Folville, Leicestershire. They had two sons, John and Thomas, both of whom died young and without issue.
