= Richard Thimelby =

Richard Thimelby (also known as Richard Ashby; born 1614 – died 7 January 1672) was an English Jesuit missionary priest.

== Life ==
Thimelby was born in Lincolnshire, England. He entered the Society of Jesus in 1632. Having taught philosophy and theology at Liège for about sixteen years, he was sent to work back in his native county. In 1666 he became Master of Novices at Ghent and Rector of the College of St Omer in 1672, where he remained until his death.

== Works ==
Thimelby's translation of Etienne Binet's Treatise on Purgatory was edited by William Henry Anderdon in 1874. Thimelby also wrote a controversial work, Remarks on Stillingfleet (London, 1672).
