= Hawken (disambiguation) =

Hawken is a Nordic-based forename but is also a surname. It may also refer to:

- Hawken rifle, a type of muzzleloading rifle from the 19th century
- Hawken School, an independent, coeducational, college preparatory day school in Northeast Ohio, USA
- Hawken (video game), a multiplayer mech combat video game developed by Reloaded Games
