= Senator Hawkins (disambiguation) =

Benjamin Hawkins (1754–1818) was a U.S. Senator from North Carolina from 1789 to 1795. Senator Hawkins may also refer to:

- C. R. Hawkins (1900–1959), Missouri State Senate
- Charles R. Hawkins (born 1943), Virginia State Senate
- Edward Hawkins (New York politician) (1829–1908), New York State Senate
- George C. Hawkins (1918–1991), Alabama State Senate
- George Sydney Hawkins (1808–1878), Florida State Senate
- Henry Hawkins (politician) (1790–1845), New York State Senate
- John A. Hawkins (New York politician) (1864–1941), New York State Senate
- John D. Hawkins (born 1968), South Carolina State Senate
- Lee Hawkins (born c. 1951), Georgia State Senate
- Micajah Thomas Hawkins (1790–1858), North Carolina
- Paula Hawkins (1927–2009), Florida State Senate
- Roy B. Hawkins (1885–1969), Iowa State Senate
- Simeon S. Hawkins (1827–1908), New York State Senate
