= Robert Codrington =

Robert Codrington may refer to:

- Robert Codrington (translator) (c.1602–c. 1665), English author
- Robert Edward Codrington (1869–1908), British colonial administrator
- Robert Henry Codrington (1830–1922), English Anglican priest and anthropologist
