= Thomas Hawkins =

Thomas or Tom Hawkins may refer to:

- Sir Thomas Hawkins (died 1640), 17th-century English poet and translator
- Thomas Hawkins (pirate) (died 1690), English pirate active off America's New England coast
- Thomas Hawkins (literary editor) (1729–1772), English Anglican priest and academic
- Thomas Jarman Hawkins (1809–1885), Australian politician
- Thomas R. Hawkins (1840–1870), American soldier
- Thomas Hawkins (geologist) (1810–1889), English fossil collector
- Thomas W. Hawkins Jr. (1938–2024), American historian of mathematics
- Thomas Fisher (MP) (died 1577), or Thomas Hawkins, English politician
- Tom Hawkins (basketball) (1936–2017), American basketball player
- Tom Hawkins (footballer), Australian rules footballer for Geelong
- Tom Hawkins (writer) (1927–1988), Beat generation poet believed responsible for the "Wanda Tinasky" letter of the 1980s
- Thomas Hawkins (priest) (1766–1850), Church of Ireland priest
- Thomas Desmond Hawkins (1923–2015), dean of Cambridge University's school of clinical medicine
- Thomas William Hawkins (born 1963), American murderer and possible serial killer
