= Francis Hawkins (Jesuit) =

Francis Hawkins (1628–1681) was an English Jesuit, known as a child prodigy and translator.

== Life ==
Hawkins is notable for two translations he made while quite young. He later had a long career among the English speaking Jesuits in exile. His father was the grammarian and physician John Hawkins; Sir Thomas Hawkins and the Jesuit leader Henry Hawkins were his uncles.

As a young man and adult, Hawkins lived at Anglophone centers of Jesuit learning and service in Europe: he went between the Jesuit College at Watten, the English college at Liège, and the college of Saint Omer. He took his vows in 1662, and then served in multiple college positions.

Hawkins finally settled at Liège in 1675. He died of unknown causes in 1681.

== Works ==
At the age of ten, Hawkins published An Alarum for Ladyes, translated from Jean Puget de la Serre, and dedicated to Edward Sackville, 4th Earl of Dorset. At 13, he published Youths Behaviour, or, Decency in Conversation amongst Men (1641). It was a translation from a French conduct book.

It is possible that the latter work was translated earlier, and only published in 1641: there are internal references to its being the first translation by Hawkins. Youths Behaviour was popular and ran to ten editions by 1672. Robert Codrington wrote Youths Behaviour, or, Decency in Conversation amongst Women in 1664.
