= Francis Hawkins =

Francis Hawkins may refer to:

- Francis Hawkins (Jesuit) (1628–1681), English Jesuit, child prodigy and translator
- Francis Hawkins (priest) (c.1643–1699), Anglican priest
- Francis Hawkins (physician, 1794–1877), English physician
- Frank Hawkins (politician) (1897–1971), Australian politician
- Francis Bisset Hawkins (1796–1894), English physician

== See also ==
- Frances Hawkins (1921–2001), American politician, member of the Nevada State Assembly
