= Henry T. Hawkins =

American state legislator

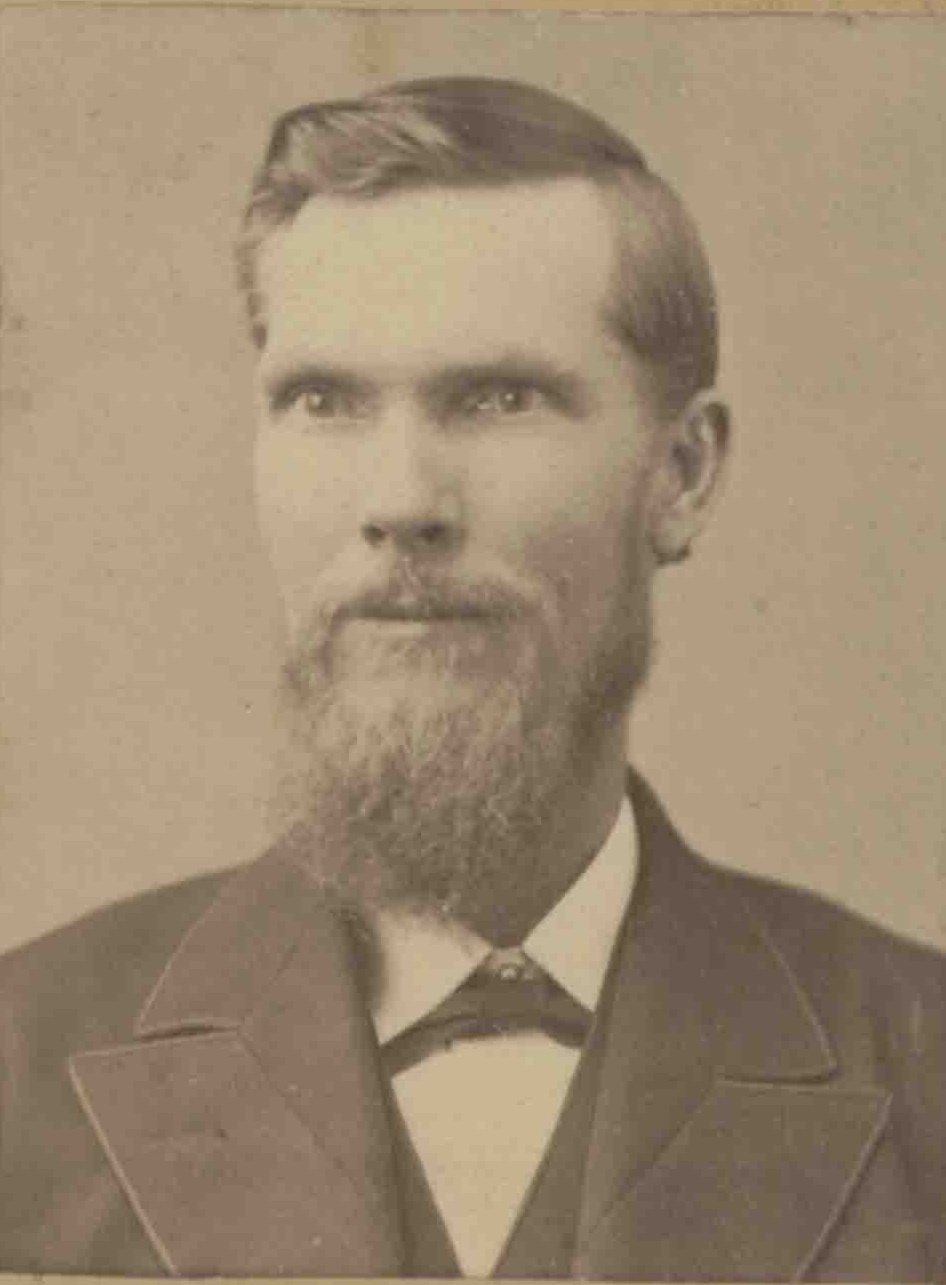

Henry T. Hawkins (1843 – November 25, 1903) was a state legislator in Arkansas. He served in the Arkansas House of Representatives and Arkansas Senate. John Edgar Hawkins was his son.

His family lived in Georgia and he relocated to Arkansas in 1850 settling in Mount Holly, Arkansas.

He represented Columbia County, Arkansas in the Arkansas House of Representatives from 1881-1889.

He chaired the Committee on Penitentiary.

In 1881 he and R. I. Emerson represented Columbia County in the Arkansas House.

He was part of the joint legislative committee of the Arkansas House and Senate that reported on Arkansas Industrial University in Fayetteville.
