= Judge Hawkins =

Judge Hawkins may refer to:

- Falcon Black Hawkins Jr. (1927–2005), judge of the United States District Court for the District of South Carolina
- Michael Daly Hawkins (born 1945), judge of the United States Court of Appeals for the Ninth Circuit

== See also ==
- Justice Hawkins (disambiguation)
