= Matt Hawkins =

Matt Hawkins may refer to:

- Matt Hawkins (rugby union) (born 1983), South African born, American rugby union player
- Matt Hawkins (racing driver) (1988–2009), American racing driver
- Matt Hawkins (cyclist) (born 1982), American mountain bike racer and road cyclist
