= Hawking =

Hawking may refer to:

== People ==
- Stephen Hawking (1942–2018), English theoretical physicist and cosmologist
- Hawking (surname), a family name (including a list of other persons with the name)

== Film ==
- Hawking (2004 film), about Stephen Hawking
- Hawking (2013 film), about Stephen Hawking

== Animals ==
- Hawking (birds), in birds, catching flying insects
- Hawking (falconry), the sport of hunting with hawks

== Outer space ==
- 7672 Hawking, a minor planet
- Hawking radiation, thermal radiation emitted outside a black hole

== Music ==
- Hawking (band), a Canadian alternative rock band

== Trade ==
- Street hawking, vending merchandise on the street

== See also ==
- Hawker (disambiguation)
- Hawk (disambiguation)
- List of terms and subjects named after Stephen Hawking
