= Paul Hawkins =

Paul Hawkins may refer to:

- Paul Hawkins (humorist) (born 1987), British author of comedy books
- Paul Hawkins (mathematician), British mathematician who co-invented the Hawk-Eye system for tracking balls in cricket and tennis
- Paul Hawkins (musician), British singer-songwriter associated with London's antifolk scene
- Paul Hawkins (politician) (1912–2002), British Conservative politician
- Paul Hawkins (racing driver) (1937–1969), Australian racing car driver

== See also ==
- Paul Hawken, environmentalist, entrepreneur and author
