= John Hawkins (grammarian) =

English physician, grammarian and translator

John Hawkins (c. 1587 – c. 1641) was an English physician, known as a grammarian and translator.

== Life ==
He was a son of Sir Thomas Hawkins (died 1617) of Nash Court, Boughton under Blean, Kent, and his wife, Ann Pettyt; the family was recusant, with Sir Thomas Hawkins and Henry Hawkins the Jesuit being elder brothers. He took his degree of M.D. at the University of Padua.

Hawkins appeared in John Gee's list of Popish Physicians in and about the City of London in 1624 as residing in Charterhouse Court. He was not elected to the College of Physicians of London.

== Works ==
Hawkins published:

- A brief Introduction to Syntax, collected out of Nebrissa. … With the Concordance supplyed by J. H., London, 1631, translated from Antonio de Nebrija.
- Discursus de Melancholia Hypochondriaca, Heidelberg, 1633.
- The Ransome of Time being captive. Wherein is declared how precious a thing is Time, London, 1634, translation from the Spanish of Andreas de Soto.
- Dictionary of Latin verbs (1634)
- Particulæ Latinæ Orationis, collectæ, dispositæ, et confabulationibus digestæ, London, 1635, on Latin grammatical particles.
- Paraphrase upon the seaven Penitential Psalms, London, 1635, translated from Italian.

== Family ==
Hawkins married Frances, daughter of Francis Power of Bletchingdon, Oxfordshire. Francis Hawkins the Jesuit was their son.
