= David Hawkins =

David Hawkins may refer to:

- David Hawkins (basketball) (born 1982), American basketball player
- David Hawkins (bishop) (born 1949), Bishop of Barking
- David Hawkins (footballer) (born 1933), English footballer
- David Hawkins (philosopher) (1913–2002), American professor and philosopher
- David Hawkins (RAF officer) (1937–2019), Royal Air Force officer
- David Hawkins (swimmer) (1933–2020), Australian swimmer
- J. David Hawkins (born 1945), American academic in the field of social work

== See also ==
- Samuel David Hawkins (born 1933), American, youngest defector of the Korean War
