= Hawken =

Origin
- Origin: Haakon
- Region of origin: Norway

Other names
- Variant forms: Hawkins, Hawking

The surname Hawken comes from the Nordic given name Haakon, the name of seven Norwegian kings. The given name evolved to Hakon, and variations include: Håkon, Haakon, Horken, Hörken, Hawkin, Hawkins, and Hawken. Hawken is a possible variation of the English language surname "Hawkins".

It is also used as a first name, mostly amongst direct Norwegian lineages.

People with the name Hawken include:

- Dominic Hawken (born 1967), keyboard player and session musician
- Jacob and Samuel Hawken (1786–1849) and (1792–1884), American gunsmiths
- John Hawken (born 1940), English keyboard player
- Les Hawken (born 1949), former Australian rules footballer
- Nicholas Hawken (1836–1908), English-born Australian politician
- Paul Hawken (born 1946) American environmentalist, entrepreneur, author, and activist
- Roger Hawken (1878–1947), Australian engineer
- Spencer Hawken (born 1973), British director, writer, producer and film critic

== Given name ==
- Walter Hawken Tregellas (1831–1894), British writer
