= George Hawking =

Australian rules footballer

Personal information
- Full name: George William Hawking
- Born: 22 May 1902; Rushworth, Victoria
- Died: 25 November 1968 (aged 66); Edithvale, Victoria
- Original team: Rushworth Football Club
- Height: 185 cm (6 ft 1 in)
- Weight: 80 kg (176 lb)

Playing career^{1}
Years	Club	Games (Goals)
1927	Carlton	4 (3)
- ^{1} Playing statistics correct to the end of 1927.

George William Hawking (22 May 1902 – 25 November 1968) was an Australian rules footballer who played with Carlton in the Victorian Football League (VFL).

== Family ==
The son of George Frederick Hawking (1874–1936), and Susan Jane Hawking (1870–1923), née Pugh, George William Hawking was born at Rushworth, Victoria on 22 May 1902. His uncle, Tom Hawking, played for South Melbourne in 1904.

He married Irene Annie McCrae in 1925.

== Football ==
Recruited from the Rushworth Football Club in the Goulburn Valley Football League, he played four senior games for Carlton in 1927, before returning to Rushworth. He was still playing with Rushworth in September 1938.

== Military service ==
He enlisted in the Second AIF in July 1940, and served overseas with the 2/5 Australian Infantry Battalion.

== Death ==
He died at Edithvale, Victoria on 25 November 1968.
