= Robert Hawkins =

Robert Hawkins may refer to:

== People ==
- Robert Hawkins (artist) (born 1951), American artist
- Robert Hawkins (Manitoba politician) (1879–1962), politician in Manitoba, Canada
- Robert Hawkins (Northwest Territories politician), engineering technologist and politician from the Northwest Territories, Canada
- Robert Arthur Hawkins (1988–2007), gunman in the Westroads Mall shooting
- Robert Hawkins (1924–2017) American journalist and film critic for Variety
- Rob Hawkins (born 1983), English rugby union player
- Rob Hawkins (wheelchair rugby league), English wheelchair rugby league player
- Robert Hawkins (basketball) (1954–1993), American basketball player
- Robert Hawkins (golfer), African-American founder of the United Golf Association
- Robert Hawkins (sport shooter) (1875–1945), sport shooter for Great Britain at the 1908 Summer Olympics
- Robert Henry Hawkins (1892–1989), priest of the Church of England and Canon of Windsor

== Fiction ==
- Robert Hawkins (Jericho character)
- Robert Hawkins, father of Virgil Hawkins (a.k.a. Static) and Sharon Hawkins
- Robert Hawkins, a main character in the 2008 film Cloverfield
