= Tom Hawking =

Australian rules footballer

Personal information
- Full name: Arthur Thomas Hawking
- Born: 19 February 1882; Redcastle, Victoria
- Died: 15 December 1952 (aged 70); Kew, Victoria
- Original team: Kyabram

Playing career^{1}
Years	Club	Games (Goals)
1904	South Melbourne	1 (0)
- ^{1} Playing statistics correct to the end of 1904.

Arthur Thomas Hawking (19 February 1882 – 15 December 1952) was an Australian rules footballer who played with South Melbourne in the Victorian Football League (VFL).

== Family ==
The ninth of the eleven children of William Henry Hawking (1837–1899), and Margaret Hawking (1845–1913), née Morgan, Arthur Thomas Hawking was born at Redcastle, Victoria on 19 February 1882. His nephew, George William Hawking (1902–1968), the son of his older brother George, played VFL football with Carlton in 1927.

He married Alice Kate Pell (1877–1970), in Echuca, Victoria, in 1906. They had two children: Ronald Arthur Hawking (1907–1978), and Norman Hawking (1908–1978).

== Football ==
For many years Hawking was mistakenly identified in official VFL records as "Tom Hawkins", born in 1885.

=== Kyabram (GVDFA) ===
He played for the Kyabram Football Club in the Goulburn Valley District Football Association (GVDFA) "almost continually [from 1901] for more than 12 years".

=== South Melbourne (VFL) ===
He played in one game for South Melbourne, in the match against St Kilda, at the Junction Oval, on 30 July 1904, the second-last round of the home-and-away season.

"A clever little country player named Hawking roved for South Melbourne [on 30 July], and though new to metropolitan football, he showed neither greenness nor timidity, but dashed in from the first, and dodged cleverly, picking his man with all the skill and coolness of a veteran." — The Leader, 6 August 1904.

== Death ==
He died at Kew, Victoria on 15 December 1952.
