= Hawkins Ranch =

- Location within Texas
- 28.8331°N 95.7226°W
- Location: Matagorda, Texas, U.S.

History
- Founded: 1846; 180 years ago
- Built for: James Boyd Hawkins

The Hawkins Ranch, also known as Hawkins Plantation, is a historic site and currently a cattle ranch, located in Matagorda County, Texas. It was established in 1846, as a working forced-labor farm raising sugarcane using enslaved African Americans. After the American Civil War ended in 1865, the site employed paid laborers and former convicts, and by c. 1890 it became a cattle ranch.

== History ==
The Hawkins Ranch was established by James Boyd Hawkins in 1846. It was a sugarcane plantation, with 101 African American slaves by 1860. In December 1863, during the American Civil War of 1861–1865, Confederate States Army General John B. Magruder was inspecting coastal defenses in the area and "stopp[ed] awhile at Hawkins' plantation and other hospitable places." After the war, paid laborers were supplemented by convicts. For example, in 1876, Hawkins employed 37 convicts. In September 1887, there was an uprising of the African Americans near the plantation, as reported by The Galveston Daily News.

By the mid-1890s, the plantation had stopped raising sugarcane and started to be focused on growing corn, cotton, and raising cattle. In the wake of the invention of barbed wire (in the late 1800s), the plantation gradually became more focused on becoming a cattle ranch. Gas wells and trails were built throughout the ranch. Most cattle are a crossbreed of Hereford and Brahman cattle.

In 1919, Hamill and Associates conducted a test to determine whether oil existed on the ranch, but drilling did not continue. Orbit Petroleum operated gas wells on the ranch for several years. Gas wells were shut in by the Texas Railroad Commission as a result of Hurricane Rita in 2005, and they were reopened in 2007.
