= Hawkins, Wisconsin =

- Village
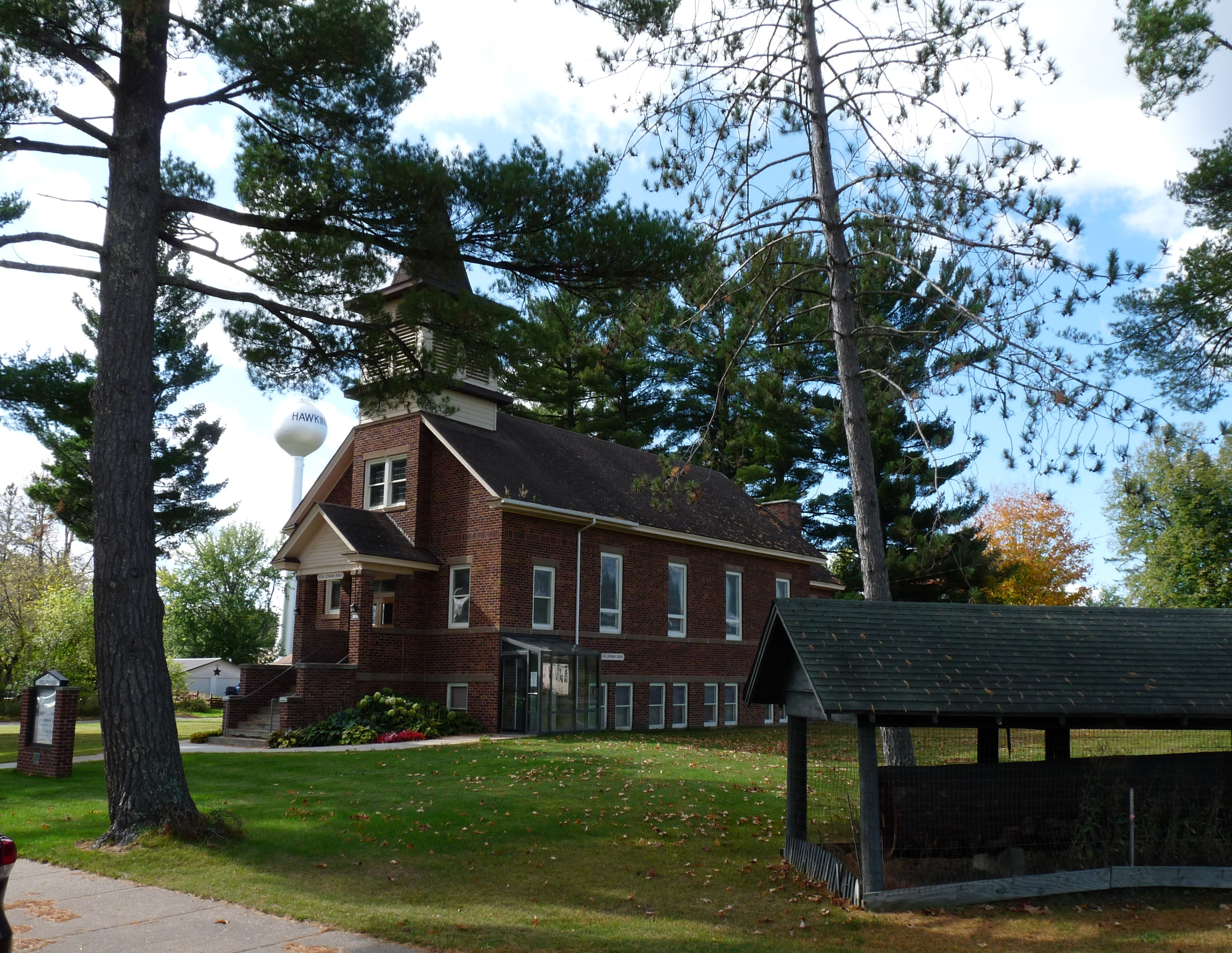
- Bethel Lutheran, with a historic pine log on right

- Location of Hawkins in Rusk County, Wisconsin.
- Coordinates: 45°29′49″N 90°43′0″W
- Country: United States
- State: Wisconsin
- County: Rusk

Area
  - Total: 2.22 sq mi (5.76 km^{2})
  - Land: 2.20 sq mi (5.71 km^{2})
  - Water: 0.019 sq mi (0.05 km^{2})
- Elevation: 1,371 ft (418 m)

Population (2020)
  - Total: 331
  - Density: 150/sq mi (58.0/km^{2})
- Time zone: UTC-6 (Central (CST))
  - Summer (DST): UTC-5 (CDT)
- Area codes: 715 & 534
- FIPS code: 55-33300
- GNIS feature ID: 1566157
- Website: villageofhawkinswi.com

Hawkins is a village in Rusk County in north-central Wisconsin, United States. The population was 331 at the 2020 census. The village is located within the Town of Hawkins.

== History ==
Before the railroad came, the area around Hawkins was forested, cut by Main Creek and its tributaries, with swamp in the lowlands along those branches. In 1884 the Minneapolis, St. Paul and Sault Ste. Marie Railroad (the Soo Line) built its line through the area, aiming to connect the grain of the Twin Cities with the shipping at Sault Ste. Marie. The railroad created a station near where it crossed the south fork of Main Creek, which became Hawkins.

The source of the name Hawkins is uncertain. The station was most likely named for Marsh P. Hawkins, who was the secretary and treasurer of the Minneapolis & St. Louis division of the Minneapolis, St. Paul & Sault Ste. Marie Railroad in the 1880s. Or it may have been named for a lumberman named Hawkins who owned land in the area. There is also a suggestion that the Norwegian settlers may have named the town for King Haakon of Norway.

An 1888 map of the township shows a siding and depot and a few other buildings north of the main rail line. It also shows a tote road along the south side of the railroad from the west, then on the east side of Hawkins turning south to head to the Jump River.

C.P. Crosby built the first sawmill in Hawkins in 1898. Other sawmills were added and the town grew, adding a store, a hotel, a boarding house, meat market, bank, hardware store, restaurants, and other businesses. Also added were a lath mill, a planing mill, a shingle mill, and a box factory that made piano crates, Cream of Wheat boxes, ammunition boxes, etc. Many of the businesses burned in the 1920s and '30s, and most rebuilt. A 1914 map of Hawkins shows tidy blocks of residential lots with two churches, a school, and a rail spur arcing off into the yards of the Ellingson Lumber Co.

Early on, the community had a small log school that accommodated five or six students. Another building was added in 1899, and in 1903 a four-room, two-story school was built. In 1916 Hawkins High School was built, and a graded elementary school was built in 1921.

In 1920 a cheese factory opened and the town began a burst of growth. In 1922 Northern Sash and Door opened. The plant burned in 1967, but rebuilt and eventually became Norco and then Jeld-Wen. Toward the end Jeld-Wen employed about 340, but Hawkins' long-time major employer closed in 2024.

In 1967 the Hawkins School District merged with Ladysmith and high school students were bused from Hawkins to Ladysmith. In 2009 Hawkins detached from Ladysmith and joined the Flambeau district.

== Geography ==
Hawkins is located at 45°30′44″N 90°42′48″W (45.512448, -90.713483).

According to the United States Census Bureau, the village has a total area of 2.22 square miles (5.75 km^{2}), of which 2.21 square miles (5.72 km^{2}) is land and 0.01 square miles (0.03 km^{2}) is water.

Hawkins is situated along U.S. Highway 8 and County Road M.

== Demographics ==
Historical population
Census	Pop.	Note	%±
1930	372		—
1940	496		33.3%
1950	414		−16.5%
1960	402		−2.9%
1970	385		−4.2%
1980	407		5.7%
1990	375		−7.9%
2000	317		−15.5%
2010	305		−3.8%
2020	331		8.5%
U.S. Decennial Census

=== 2010 census ===
As of the census of 2010, there were 305 people, 159 households, and 84 families living in the village. The population density was 138.0 inhabitants per square mile (53.3/km^{2}). There were 182 housing units at an average density of 82.4 per square mile (31.8/km^{2}). The racial makeup of the village was 97.0% White, 0.3% Native American, 0.3% Asian, 0.3% from other races, and 2.0% from two or more races.

There were 159 households, of which 18.9% had children under the age of 18 living with them, 40.9% were married couples living together, 7.5% had a female householder with no husband present, 4.4% had a male householder with no wife present, and 47.2% were non-families. 40.9% of all households were made up of individuals, and 18.8% had someone living alone who was 65 years of age or older. The average household size was 1.92 and the average family size was 2.56.

The median age in the village was 47.5 years. 17.7% of residents were under the age of 18; 2.7% were between the ages of 18 and 24; 21.9% were from 25 to 44; 36.1% were from 45 to 64; and 21.6% were 65 years of age or older. The gender makeup of the village was 52.5% male and 47.5% female.

=== 2000 census ===
As of the census of 2000, there were 317 people, 138 households, and 92 families living in the village. The population density was 144.8 people per square mile (55.9/km^{2}). There were 147 housing units at an average density of 67.2 per square mile (25.9/km^{2}). The racial makeup of the village was 98.11% White, 0.32% from other races, and 1.58% from two or more races. 0.00% of the population were Hispanic or Latino of any race.

There were 138 households, out of which 22.5% had children under the age of 18 living with them, 56.5% were married couples living together, 6.5% had a female householder with no husband present, and 33.3% were non-families. 26.1% of all households were made up of individuals, and 12.3% had someone living alone who was 65 years of age or older. The average household size was 2.30 and the average family size was 2.79.

In the village, the population was spread out, with 19.2% under the age of 18, 10.7% from 18 to 24, 24.9% from 25 to 44, 24.6% from 45 to 64, and 20.5% who were 65 years of age or older. The median age was 42 years. For every 100 females, there were 105.8 males. For every 100 females age 18 and over, there were 101.6 males.

The median income for a household in the village was $29,286, and the median income for a family was $39,250. Males had a median income of $28,250 versus $23,393 for females. The per capita income for the village was $17,159. About 3.2% of families and 3.6% of the population were below the poverty line, including none of those under age 18 and 10.8% of those age 65 or over.
