= George Hawkins =

George Hawkins may refer to:

- George C. Hawkins (1918–1991), Alabama state legislator
- George Hawkins (actor), British actor
- George Hawkins (athlete) (1883–1917), British Olympic athlete
- George Hawkins (footballer) (1908–1979), Australian rules footballer
- George Hawkins (politician) (born 1946), New Zealand politician
- George Hawkins (EastEnders), a character from the British TV soap-opera EastEnders
- George S. Hawkins (lawyer), American lawyer, college professor and environmentalist
- George Sydney Hawkins (1808–1878), US Representative from Florida

== See also ==
- George Hawkins Williams, American politician, 1882 president of the Maryland Senate
