= Jack Hawkins (disambiguation) =

Jack Hawkins (1910–1973) was an English actor.

Jack Hawkins may also refer to:

- birth name of Jack Hedley (born 1930), English actor
- Jack Hawkins (footballer) (born 1954), Australian rules footballer
- Jack Hawkins (politician) (born 1932), author and former politician from Nova Scotia, Canada
- Jack Hawkins (U.S. Marine Corps officer) (1916–2013), CIA senior planner of Bay of Pigs Invasion
- Jack Hawkins (actor, born 1985), British actor

== See also ==
- John Hawkins (disambiguation)
