= Justice Hawkins =

Justice Hawkins may refer to:

- Alvin Hawkins (1821–1905), associate justice of the Tennessee Supreme Court
- Armis E. Hawkins (1920–2006), associate justice of the Supreme Court of Mississippi
- George Sydney Hawkins (1808–1878), associate justice of the Supreme Court of Florida
- Henry Hawkins, 1st Baron Brampton (1817–1907), English judge of the High Court of Justice from 1876 to 1898
- J. Harold Hawkins (c. 1892–1961), associate justice of the Supreme Court of Georgia
- W. A. Hawkins (died 1886), associate justice of the Supreme Court of Georgia
- William E. Hawkins (1863–1937), associate justice of the Texas Supreme Court

== See also ==
- Judge Hawkins (disambiguation)
