= Paul Hawkins (humorist) =

British humourist, published in Germany (born 1987)

Paul Hawkins (born 16 April 1987) is a British humorist, published in Germany. His books include Denglisch for Better Knowers, Gebrauchsanleitung Mensch (iHuman: User Guide), and Erwachsenwerden für Anfänger (How to Deal with Adulthood).

== Books ==
- Denglisch for Better Knowers, 2013, Ullstein
- Gebrauchsanleitung Mensch: Bedienung, Wartung, Reparatur, 2014, C. H. Beck
- iHuman: User Guide, 2016, Albatross Publishing
- Erwachsenwerden für Anfänger: Die besten Tricks für Kindsköpfe, Chaoten und Spätzünder, 2016, C. H. Beck.
