= Roger Hawkins =

Roger Hawkins may refer to:

- Roger Hawkins (drummer) (1945–2021), American drummer
- Roger Hawkins (film director), Zimbabwean film director
- Roger Hawkins (politician) (1915–1980), Rhodesian politician
