= David Hawkins (footballer) =

English footballer

David Hawkins (born 11 August 1931) is an English former professional footballer of the 1950s. He played professionally for Gillingham and made a total of 14 appearances in the Football League.
