= Andrew Hawkins (cricketer) =

English cricketer (born 1967)

Personal information
- Full name: Andrew Charles Hawkins
- Born: 16 June 1967 (age 59); Stoke-on-Trent, Staffordshire, England
- Batting: Left-handed
- Bowling: Right-arm medium

Domestic team information
- Years: Team
- 1987–1989: Staffordshire

Career statistics
Competition	List A
Matches	1
Runs scored	7
Batting average	7.00
100s/50s	–/–
Top score	7
Balls bowled	66
Wickets	1
Bowling average	38.00
5 wickets in innings	–
10 wickets in match	–
Best bowling	1/38
Catches/stumpings	1/–
- Source: Cricinfo, 19 June 2011

Andrew Charles Hawkins (born 16 June 1967) is a former English cricketer. Hawkins was a left-handed batsman who bowled right-arm medium pace. He was born in Stoke-on-Trent, Staffordshire.

Hawkins made his debut for Staffordshire in the 1987 MCCA Knockout Trophy against Berkshire. Hawkins played Minor counties cricket for Staffordshire from 1987 to 1989, which a single 39 Minor Counties Championship match and a further MCCA Knockout Trophy match. In 1987, he made his only List A appearance against Warwickshire in the NatWest Trophy. In this match he was dismissed for 7 runs by Allan Donald, while with the ball he took the wicket of Dennis Amiss for the cost of 38 runs from 11 overs.
