= Rebecca Hawkins =

American pioneer woman

Rebecca Littleton Hawkins
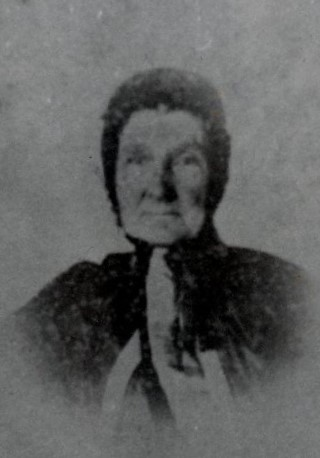
- In 1838, while living in Jackson County, Missouri, she contracted her neighbor Henry Garster to murder her husband after unsuccessfully attempting to murder him by poisoning. Garster was hung for his crime, the first hanging in Jackson County, Missouri. Rebecca was found innocent of murder, convicted of poisoning, but pardoned before serving her five year sentence.
- Born: Between 1797–1800; Putnam County, Georgia
- Died: Sometime after 1860; California, probably San Joaquin County where she was last known to live

Rebecca Ann Littleton Hawkins (née Butts) was an American woman who hired a man to murder her husband by shooting after unsuccessfully attempting to kill him by poisoning. After enduring twenty years of beatings by her husband, Williamson Hawkins, she hired her neighbor Henry Garster in 1838 to kill him. The murder led to Garster's hanging, the first in Jackson County, Missouri, in 1839. Rebecca had previously attempted and failed to murder Williamson with rat poison. She was convicted of being an accessory before the murder and for the prior attempted murder, but was found not guilty of the murder itself. She was sentenced to five years in the Missouri State Penitentiary. The Jackson County community petitioned the governor for her pardon, which he granted shortly before Rebecca's sentence began. The pardon saved her from the fate of being the first woman to be imprisoned in the Missouri State Penitentiary.

== Early life ==
Rebecca was born between 1797 and 1800 in Putnam County, Georgia, the middle of the state, on America's southern frontier. Rebecca's father, Henry Butts, was born in South Carolina. Nothing is known about Rebecca's mother, who may have died soon after Rebecca was born. Henry then married Susan Upchurch, who was also born in South Carolina. Henry was a cotton producer who owned seven slaves. Rebecca had close connections with her half-siblings, especially Salathiel, born in 1810. Her other siblings were Henry, born in 1811, Jackson, born in 1812, and Eleanor, born in 1815.

== Marriage and childbearing ==
Rebecca married Williamson Hawkins somewhere between the ages of 17 and 20 years old. She had eight children, which was typical for the women in her family. There is no known record of Rebecca and Williamson's marriage. They had four children in Henry County, Tennessee: William Henry Hawkins, born February 28, 1820; James J. Hawkins, born in 1822; Eli W. Hawkins, born in 1823; Pendleton Biddle Hawkins born in 1824; Martha Jane Hawkins Stayton, born on August 22, 1828. They had three more children, in Jackson County, Missouri: Elizabeth (Betsy) Ann Hawkins Butts, born on November 27, 1830; Jesse A. Hawkins, born in 1834; and Doctor Salathiel Hawkins, born in 1836.

Rebecca was married to Williamson and living in Stewart County, West Tennessee by the time she was twenty years old, according to the January 30, 1820 census. She would move with Williamson to yet another western frontier in Jackson County, Missouri in 1830 and again with two of her sons and their families to what would be her final frontier in California in 1850. In 1830 Rebecca traveled nearly 500 miles (800 km) by wagon train to Jackson County, Missouri, while pregnant with her sixth child. Many of her extended family members would travel in a wagon train with family to California in 1850.

Williamson's cruelty to Rebecca was well-documented in the witness accounts from Rebecca's trials. However, the law limited her legal options to stop the beatings, and her attorneys did not have a self-defense argument for Rebecca either, because she pre-meditated his murder.

Williamson was probably frequently intoxicated when he beat Rebecca. Williamson had outstanding debts to vendors for several gallons of whiskey at the time of his murder. However, Williamson's excessive drinking and the cruel beatings he gave Rebecca were frowned upon by her family and church community, demonstrated by the help Rebecca received in obtaining her pardon.

Rebecca owned no property under the law of coverture until she inherited her dower interests upon Williamson's death, which was approximately one-third of his estate. Rebecca assigned all her dower rights to her attorneys as security for her defense the day she was arrested. During the trials that ensued, Rebecca and the children lived on the estate's income, primarily slave rental income from Williamson's ten slaves.

== Slaves ==
Rebecca enlisted the help of two slaves, Ned and Mary, a married couple, to poison Williamson in September 1838. Williamson had inherited Ned and Mary, who probably helped raise him and ultimately served three generations of Hawkins family members. Mary suffered 30 lashes for her part in Rebecca's conspiracy plans to poison Williamson. By the time Williamson was murdered, he had owned ten slaves valued at $128,754 (in 2020 equivalent dollars), who generated an average annual rental income for Williamson's estate of $8,127.

== Crime and punishment ==
Rebecca paid Henry Garster $150 to kill Williamson on October 27, 1838. She removed a chink from their log cabin, leaving a hole large enough for Garster's squirrel gun. Garster, a neighbor and employee of Williamson's shot him through the heart as he dozed in his chair next to the fireplace. Garster then left tracks in the fresh layer of snow back to his home. Rebecca had previously attempted to kill Williamson in early September with rat poison. Four days later, the Sheriff arrested Garster. Rebecca was arrested at Williamson's burial on October 31, 1838. The Hawkins' slaves, Ned and Mary, a married couple, were also arrested that day. Rebecca was held in custody for 35 days until she was indicted on December 4, 1838, along with Henry, for murder, and Mary, for poisoning. Rebecca was released on bail. The charges against Ned were dropped, and he was released. On December 5, 1838, Mary pleaded guilty and was sentenced to receive thirty lashes, a penalty determined based on her status as a slave. On May 10, 1839, Garster was the first man hanged in Jackson County at the Temple Lot, While awaiting trial, Garster and his cellmate Alpha P. Buckley escaped jail. Only Garster was recaptured. Garster's attorneys did not request a change of venue despite the escape attempt, and Garster was found guilty of murder in the first degree. After his hanging, Garster's property was sold to cover his court costs but did not leave enough to pay his attorney's fees.

The jury found Rebecca not guilty of murder in the first degree on August 8, 1839. Rebecca had been charged as an accessory before the fact in the first count of murder and as a principal on the second charge of poisoning. She could not be charged for murder unless Garster was first proven guilty of murder, so her murder trial was set for April 12, 1839, two days after Garster's trial. The jury found Rebecca guilty of poisoning Williamson on July 20, 1841, and sentenced her to five years in the Missouri State Penitentiary. Rebecca had confessed to the crime after her arrest when Mary accused Rebecca of planning the murder, sending Ned to get the poison from Henry Garster, and then telling Mary to put the poison in Williamson's coffee cup. Williamson became so ill that he wrote his will, but he did not die. Rebecca's attorneys were unable to convince the jury that Mary's statement was inadmissible because it was a slave's testimony against a white person or that Rebecca was trapped into a confession. After the guilty verdict, Rebecca appealed to the Supreme Court. Rebecca was the first woman sentenced to the Missouri State Penitentiary in Jefferson City on September 11, 1841, when the Missouri Supreme Court upheld the lower court ruling. Conditions for women in the prison were very harsh. However, petitions signed by 351 influential community members along with personal letters were submitted to Governor Thomas Reynolds on Rebecca's behalf arguing for her pardon because her confession was made under unusual circumstances, her husband had brutally treated her, she had eight young children to care for, and she had an exemplary character. Governor Reynolds granted Rebecca's pardon effective as of August 2, 1841.

== Final frontier ==
In 1850, Rebecca made the four-month journey to the gold mining encampment of Sacramento, California, to set up a “boarding house” with two sons and their families. It is unknown when and where Rebecca died, but she was last known to have lived with her daughter Martha Ann and son-in-law, John Stayton, in San Joaquin County in 1860. Most of her children and their families scattered throughout California, leaving hundreds and perhaps thousands of descendants.

== Bibliography ==
- Bundschu, William B. Abuse and Murder on the Frontier: The Trials and Travels of Hawkins: 1800-1860. Independence, MO, 2003
- Chused, Richard H. “Married Women's Property Law: 1800-1850.” The Georgetown Law Journal 71, no. 5 (1983)
- Dannenbaum, Jed. “The Origins of Temperance Activism and Militancy Among American Women.” Journal of Social History 15, no. 2
- Dobash, R. Emerson, and Russell Dobash. Violence against Wives: A Case against the Patriarchy. New York: Free Press, 1979
- “Execution of Garster in 1839.” Kansas City Times, March 2, 1878, 3, col. 6
- Ewing, Charles Patrick. Battered Women Who Kill: Psychological Self-Defense as Legal Justification. Lexington, Mass, 1987
- Faragher, John Mack. Sugar Creek: Life on the Illinois Prairie. New Haven: Yale University Press, 1986
- Fischer, David Hackett. Albion's Seed: Four British Folkways in America, a Cultural History; v. 1. New York: Oxford University Press, 1989
- Goff, William A. “Garster-Hawkins | KC History.” Westport Historical Quarterly 10, no. 1 (June 1974): 19–21
- Hine, Robert V., and John Mack Faragher. The American West: A New Interpretive History. Second edition. Lamar Series in Western History. New Haven: Yale University Press, 2017, Chapter 11 “As the West Goes”
- Kremer, Gary R. “Strangers to Domestic Virtue: Nineteenth-Century Women in the Missouri Prison.” Missouri Historical Review LXXXIV, no. 3 (April 1990)
- McMillen, Sally G. Motherhood in the Old South: Pregnancy, Childbirth, and Infant Rearing. Baton Rouge: Louisiana State University Press, 1990
- Mutti Burke, Diane. On Slavery's Border: Missouri's Small Slaveholding Households, 1815-1865. Early American Places Ser. Athens: University of Georgia Press, 2010
- Nadelholft, Jerome. “Domestic Violence.” In Encyclopedia of American Social History, by Mary Kupiec Cayton, 2115–24. Scribner American Civilization Series. New York: Toronto: New York: Charles Scribner's Sons; Maxwell Macmillan Canada; Maxwell Macmillan International, 1993
- Ouellette, Richard D. “Zion's Gallows: The Cultural Geography of the Mormon Temple Lot Site.” The John Whitmer Historical Association Journal 25 (2005): 161–74
- Roach, Andrea L., Ashley E. Ermer, Marilyn Coleman, and Lawrence Ganong. “Attitudes About Intimate Partner Violence and Alcohol Consumption.” Journal of Interpersonal Violence, 2020
- Rorabaugh, W. J. “Alcohol and Alcoholism.” In Encyclopedia of American Social History, by Mary Kupiec Cayton, 2135–42. Scribner American Civilization Series. New York: Toronto: New York: Charles Scribner's Sons; Maxwell Macmillan Canada; Maxwell Macmillan International, 1993
- Segrave, Kerry. Women and Capital Punishment in America, 1840-1899: Death Sentences and Executions in the United States and Canada. Jefferson: McFarland & Company, Incorporated Publishers, 2008
- Soltow, Lee, and Edward Stevens. The Rise of Literacy and the Common School in the United States: A Socioeconomic Analysis to 1870. Chicago Originals. Chicago: University of Chicago Press, 1981
- The Examiner of East Jackson County. "Frank Haight: Old Documents Revealed Tale of Spousal Abuse and Murder". Accessed September 28, 2020.
- “The First Hanging.” Jackson Examiner (Independence, MO), October 27, 1905
- Union Historical Company. The History of Jackson County, Missouri, Containing a History of the County, Its Cities, Towns, Etc., Biographical Sketches of Its Citizens, Jackson County in the Late War... History of Missouri, Map of Jackson County. Kansas City, Mo.: Union historical company, 1881
