= Dan Hawkins =

Dan, Danny or Daniel Hawkins may refer to:

- Dan Hawkins (American football) (born 1960), American football coach and former player and sportscaster
- Daniel Hawkins (politician) (born 1960), American politician in the Kansas House of Representatives
- Daniel R. Hawkins (born 1975/76), American judge, justice of the Supreme Court of Ohio
- Dan Hawkins (musician) (born 1976), English rock guitarist
- Daniel Hawkins (rugby union) (born 1991), New Zealand rugby union player
- Dan Hawkins (footballer) (born 2001), Welsh footballer for Salford City
- D. L. Hawkins (Daniel Hawkins), a character in the TV series Heroes
- Danny Hawkins, character in the 1948 American film Moonrise
