= Joyce Hawkins =

English lexicographer and dictionary editor (1928–1992)

- Born: 1928
- Died: 1992
- Education: St Hugh's College, Oxford
- Occupation: Dictionary editor
- Employer: Oxford University Press
- Known for: Oxford dictionaries
- Notable work: The Oxford Reference Dictionary (1989)

Joyce Mary Hawkins (1928–1992) was an English lexicographer and the editor of a number of dictionaries.

== Life and career ==
Joyce Hawkins was born in 1928. She studied classics at St Hugh's College, Oxford.

Hawkins initially worked on a Patristic Greek dictionary, published in 1961 by Oxford University Press (OUP). She then worked on the Oxford English Dictionary Supplement. In this role, she read most of the works of P. G. Wodehouse for quotations. Later she was sole editor or joint editor of many OUP dictionaries, working on these until her retirement in 1991. She also appeared briefly in "Dictionary Corner" on the British television game show Countdown.

She edited the following dictionaries, published by Oxford University Press (some posthumously):

- The Oxford Illustrated Dictionary, with Jessie Coulson, et al., 1975
- The Oxford Minidictionary, 1981
- The St Michael Oxford Dictionary, 1981
- The Oxford Senior Dictionary, 1982
- The Oxford Paperback Dictionary, 1988
- The Oxford Reference Dictionary, 1989
- The Oxford Study Dictionary, 1994
- The Oxford Large Print Dictionary, 1995
- The Oxford Popular Dictionary & Thesaurus, with Sara Hawker, 1995
- The Oxford School Dictionary, 1996
- The Oxford Popular Dictionary, 1998
- The Oxford Pocket School Dictionary, with Andrew Delahunty, et al., 2000
- The Oxford Popular English Dictionary, with Lucinda Coventry, et al., 2000
- Oxford School Dictionary, with Robert Allen, Andrew Delahunty, et al., 2002
- Oxford Concise School Dictionary, with Andrew Delahunty, et al., 2003

Hawkins died in 1992.
