= Hawkins (town), Wisconsin =

Hawkins, Wisconsin
- Town
- Town of Hawkins
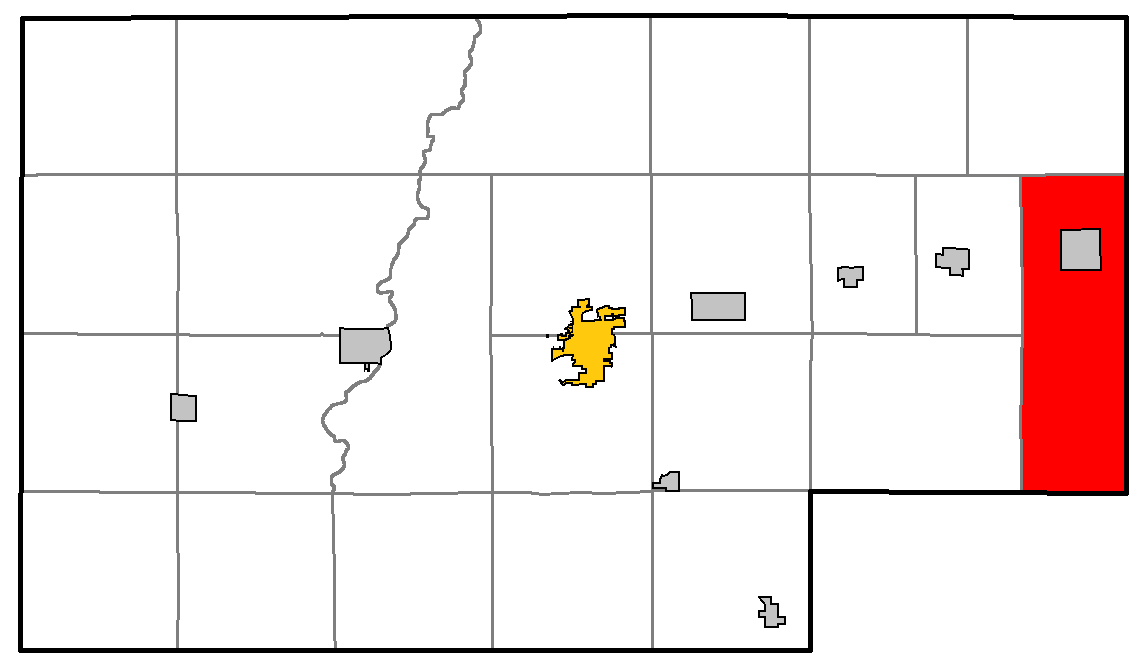
- Location of Hawkins, within Rusk County
- Coordinates: 45°27′23″N 90°44′31″W
- Country: United States
- State: Wisconsin
- County: Rusk

Area
  - Total: 45.76 sq mi (118.5 km^{2})
  - Land: 45.63 sq mi (118.2 km^{2})
  - Water: 0.13 sq mi (0.34 km^{2})

Population (2020)
  - Total: 122
  - Density: 2.67/sq mi (1.03/km^{2})
- Time zone: UTC-6 (Central (CST))
  - Summer (DST): UTC-5 (CDT)
- Area code(s): 715 and 534
- GNIS feature ID: 1583367

Hawkins is a town in Rusk County, Wisconsin, United States. The population was 122 at the 2020 census. The Village of Hawkins is located within the town.

== History ==
The town was most likely named for Marsh P. Hawkins, who was the secretary and treasurer of the Minneapolis & St. Louis division of the Minneapolis, St. Paul & Sault Ste. Marie Railroad in the 1880s.

== Geography ==
According to the United States Census Bureau, the town has a total area of 45.8 square miles (118.5 km^{2}), of which 45.6 square miles (118.2 km^{2}) is land and 0.1 square mile (0.3 km^{2}) (0.28%) is water.

== Demographics ==
As of the census of 2000, there were 170 people, 66 households, and 54 families residing in the town. The population density was 3.7 people per square mile (1.4/km^{2}). There were 97 housing units at an average density of 2.1 per square mile (0.8/km^{2}). The racial makeup of the town was 100.00% White. 1.76% of the population were Hispanic or Latino of any race.

There were 66 households, out of which 25.8% had children under the age of 18 living with them, 72.7% were married couples living together, 6.1% had a female householder with no husband present, and 16.7% were non-families. 13.6% of all households were made up of individuals, and 7.6% had someone living alone who was 65 years of age or older. The average household size was 2.58 and the average family size was 2.76.

In the town, the population was spread out, with 19.4% under the age of 18, 9.4% from 18 to 24, 16.5% from 25 to 44, 34.1% from 45 to 64, and 20.6% who were 65 years of age or older. The median age was 46 years. For every 100 females, there were 120.8 males. For every 100 females age 18 and over, there were 107.6 males.

The median income for a household in the town was $33,125, and the median income for a family was $33,750. Males had a median income of $26,875 versus $19,167 for females. The per capita income for the town was $13,766. About 8.9% of families and 10.6% of the population were below the poverty line, including 10.3% of those under the age of 18 and 10.0% of those 65 or over.
