= Étienne Binet =

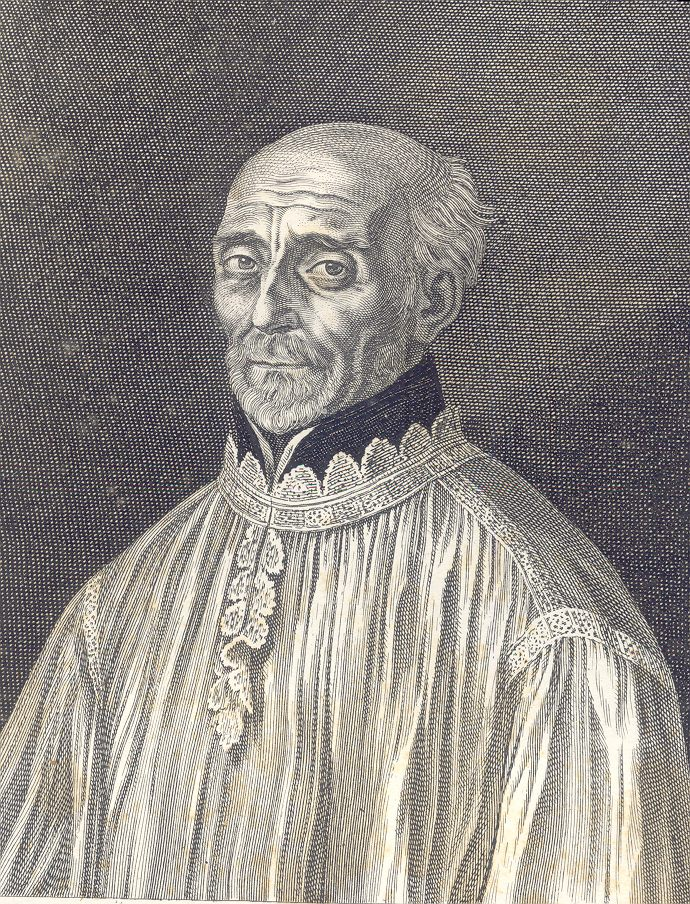
Étienne Binet, Jesuit

Étienne Binet (1569 – 1639) was a Jesuit author of 45 published works. He was born in Dijon, France, and died in Paris.

== Biography ==
Binet was the school-fellow and life-long friend of Francis de Sales. He entered the Society of Jesus in 1590 and was rector of the colleges at Rouen and Paris, and provincial of Paris, Lyons, and Champagne.

== Works ==
The 1913 Catholic Encyclopedia praises the style, "turn of thought", and "apt quotations" in Binet's writings, recommending them as "pleasurable and profitable spiritual reading". Binet's forty-five published works include:

- Flowers from the Psalms (Rouen, 1615), translated into Italian and Latin
- Consolation and Joy for the Sick and Afflicted (Rouen, 1616), republished fourteen times in eight years
- Essay on Nature's Wonders (Rouen, 1621), a popular scientific work which passed through 24 editions before 1658
- Life of St. Ignatius (1622)
- Life of St. Francis Xavier (1622)
- Vies es SS. Elzear et Dauphine, translated into English (London, 1638)
- Vie de Ste. Aldegonde, published in English at Paris in 1632
- Purgatory Surveyed, translated by Richard Thimelby (London, 1663) and republished by William Henry Anderdon (London, 1874)
- The Rich Man Saved by the Golden Gate of Heaven; Motives and Power of Almsgiving (Paris, 1627), translated into Latin, Italian, and German
- Mary, God's Masterpiece (Paris, 1634), republished six times
- How Should Religious Superiors Govern?, published twelve times in French, three in Latin, three in Italian, and one in German
- Divine Favors Granted to St. Joseph (Paris, 1639), translated into English (London, 1890)
