= Thomas Hawkins (priest) =

Thomas Hawkins (27 June 1766 – 17 January 1850) was a Church of Ireland priest in Ireland during the late eighteenth and early nineteenth centuries.

Hawkins was born in County Kildare and educated at Trinity College, Dublin. He was Rector of Dunkerrin in the Diocese of Kildare, and in 1807 he was appointed a chaplain to The Lord Lieutenant of Ireland. He became Dean of Clonfert in 1812, and held the post until his death.
