= Richard Hawkins (disambiguation) =

Sir Richard Hawkins (c. 1562–1622) was an English seaman and explorer.

Richard Hawkins may also refer to:

- Richard Hawkins (bishop) (born 1939), Bishop of Crediton, 1996–2004
- Richard Hawkins (cricketer), English cricketer
- Richard Hawkins (publisher) (died 1633), London publisher
- Richard Hawkins (artist) (born 1961), American artist
