= John Russell Hawkins =

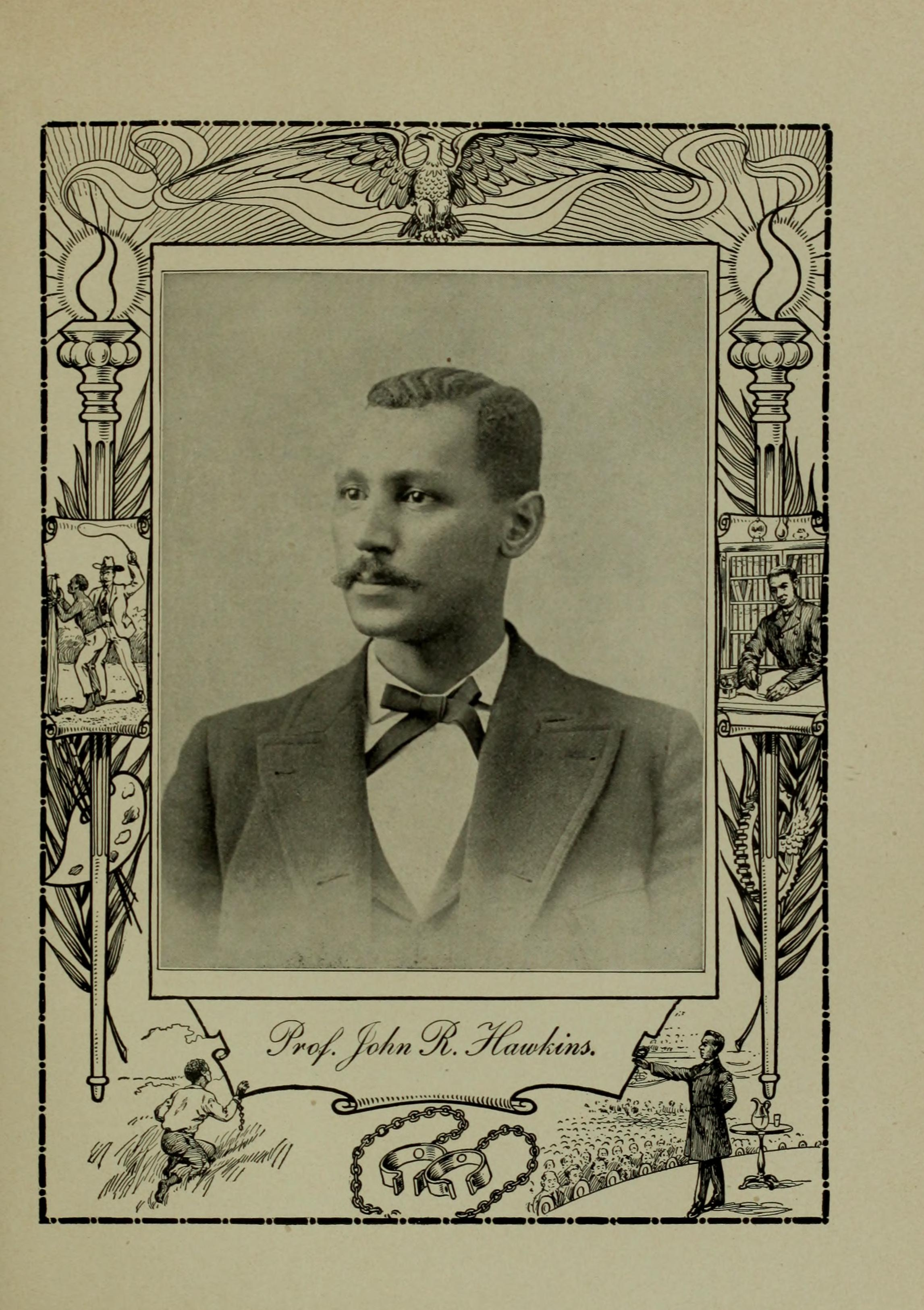
John Russell Hawkins

John Russell Hawkins (May 31, 1862 – August 22, 1939) was a professor, administrator, and college president.

He married Lillian M. Kennedy of Sioux Falls, South Dakota. They had a son and a daughter.

He served as president of Kittrell College.
