= Matt Hawkins (cyclist) =

American cyclist (born 1982)

Matt Hawkins (born September 18, 1982 in Bangor, Maine) is both a former professional mountain bike racer as well as a former professional road cyclist.

Hawkins began racing in 1998 at the suggestion of local bike shop owner Walter Wallace. He started out doing local mountain bike races and, by the end of the season, he had moved up to the Expert class and was placing well. The next year was Hawkins's breakout year; he trained all winter and got picked up by the Mountain Bike team SoBe/Headshok, traveling the National circuit racing as a junior expert. He had a few podium appearances at Nationals and was ranked #4 nationally and #1 in New England, while never finishing a local race outside the top 3.

As 2000 rolled around it marked Hawkins's last year as a junior and he again traveled the national circuit. This time around he had linked up with the Team Grimace junior development program and he again scored some podiums, this time at Junior World Cup races. In addition, he retained his #1 ranking in New England and went one spot better in the national rankings, where he was ranked #3. He also discovered road bikes during the 2000 season, qualifying for the Eastern Regional team, and racing the junior world cup Tour l’Abitibi. He started 2000 as a category 5 on the road and finished the season as a category 2.

2001 was Hawkins's first year as a senior, and he marked it by earning his professional MTB license, allowing him to do National Championship events. He qualified for the National MTB team, was a resident athlete at the United States Olympic Training Center and represented the United States at the 2001 MTB world championships in Vail, Colorado.

2003 Hawkins earned his professional road racing license and rode with the Kissena Pro Cycling Team in the United States. He spent most of the season in Belgium and Poland riding with the National U23 road team; an untimely illness forced his early retirement from the sport.
