= Hawkins, Idaho =

Unincorporated community in the state of Idaho, United States

Coordinates: 42°32′37″N 112°20′32″W

Hawkins is an unincorporated community in Bannock County, in the U.S. state of Idaho.

== History ==
A post office called Hawkins was established in 1901, and remained in operation until 1922. The community was named after a pioneer citizen.

Hawkins' population was 40 in 1909.
