= James Boyd Hawkins =

American planter and rancher (1813–1896)

- Born: December 27, 1813; Franklin County, North Carolina, U.S.
- Died: May 11, 1896 (aged 82); Matagorda County, Texas, U.S.
- Education: United States Military Academy
- Occupations: Planter, rancher
- Spouse: Ariella Alston
- Children: 8
- Parent(s): John D. Hawkins; Jane A. Boyd
- Relatives: Willis Alston (father-in-law)

Colonel James Boyd Hawkins (December 27, 1813 – May 11, 1896) was an American planter and rancher. He moved from North Carolina to Texas in the 1840s, and he established the Hawkins Ranch, a working sugarcane plantation, operated by 101 enslaved African Americans by 1860. After the American Civil War, he replaced the slaves with paid laborers and convicts, and gradually turned his landholdings into a cattle ranch.

== Early life ==
James Boyd Hawkins was born on December 27, 1813, in Franklin County, North Carolina. His father, John Davis Hawkins, was a "land owner in Franklin and Warren counties" who "served in the state senate, 1834, 1836, 1838, and 1840." His mother was Jane A. Boyd.

Hawkins attended schools in Raleigh, North Carolina, followed by the United States Military Academy in West Point, New York for two years.

== Career ==
Hawkins sailed from North Carolina to Galveston, Texas in 1846. He settled near the Caney Creek, a Southern plantation in Matagorda County. He established in the Hawkins Ranch in Matagorda County, Texas in 1846. He brought African slaves and raised cotton and sugar cane. Ten years after his arrival in Texas, he built the Hawkins Lake House.

By 1860, Hawkins was the owner of 101 African slaves. During the American Civil War of 1861–1865, Confederate General John B. Magruder used his ranch as headquarters.

In the postbellum era, Hawkins used convicts rather than slaves. By then, Hawkins was the owner of between 40,000 and 50,000 acres of land. In 1866, he registered the "H Hook", a cattle brand. With the invention of barbed wire, he turned his plantation into a cattle ranch.

== Personal life ==
Hawkins married Ariella Alston, the daughter of Congressman Willis Alston, in 1834. They had eight children.

== Death and legacy ==
Hawkins died on May 11, 1896, in Matagorda County, Texas. The town of Hawkinsville, Texas was named in his honor. The Hawkins Ranch became a cattle ranch.
