= Christopher Hawkins (cricketer) =

English cricketer

Personal information
- Full name: Christopher George Hawkins
- Born: 31 August 1938; Slough, Buckinghamshire, England
- Died: 29 December 2022 (aged 84)
- Batting: Right-handed
- Bowling: Right-arm medium
- Role: Wicket-keeper

Domestic team information
- Years: Team
- 1957: Warwickshire
- 1955–1965: Buckinghamshire

Career statistics
Competition	First-class
Matches	4
Runs scored	16
Batting average	5.33
100s/50s	0/0
Top score	11*
Catches/stumpings	7/2
- Source: Cricinfo, 27 June 2011

Christopher George Hawkins (31 August 1938 – 29 December 2022) was an English cricketer. He was a right-handed batsman who fielded as a wicket-keeper. He was born in Slough, Buckinghamshire.

Hawkins made his debut for Buckinghamshire in the 1955 Minor Counties Championship against Norfolk. He played Minor counties cricket for Buckinghamshire from 1955 to 1965, making 44 Minor Counties Championship appearances. Hawkins made his first-class debut for Warwickshire against Cambridge University in 1957. His next first-class appearance was his only County Championship game, which came against Northamptonshire. He played two further first-class matches in 1957, against Scotland and the Combined Services. A specialist wicket-keeper, Hawkins scored just 16 runs in his four first-class matches, with a high score of 11 not out. He took seven catches and made two stumpings.
