= John Edgar Hawkins =

Arkansas politician

John Edgar Hawkins (September 19, 1869 – September 7, 1944) was a politician in Arkansas. He served as mayor of Magnolia, Arkansas in 1903, 1904, 1906, 1907 and served in the state legislature representing Columbia County, Arkansas from 1915 to 1916.

His father H. T. Hawkins was a state legislator for 25 years, born in Alabama to a family from Georgia related to prominent leaders of that state.

Hawkins was chairman of the Columbia County Democratic Central Committee.
