= William Henry Anderdon =

English Jesuit and writer

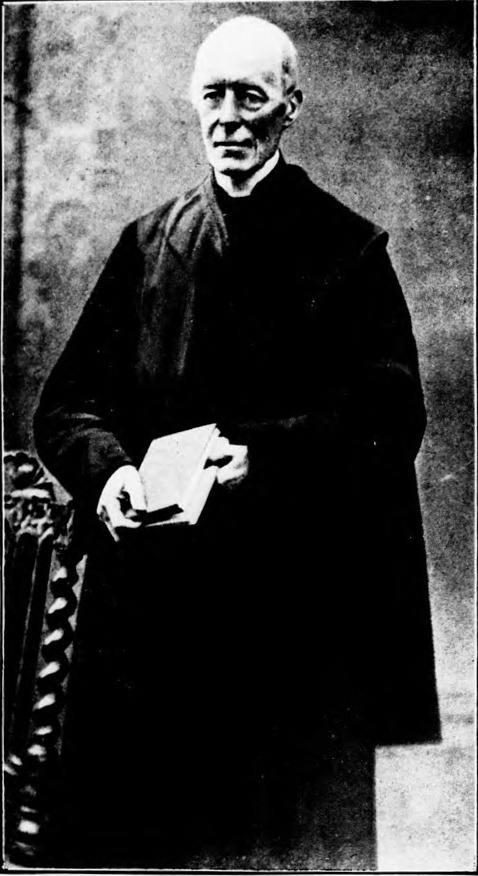
- Born: 26 December 1816; London
- Died: 28 July 1890 (aged 73); Roehampton
- Alma mater: Balliol College; University College, Oxford
- Occupation: Writer

William Henry Anderdon (26 December 1816 – 28 July 1890) was an English Jesuit and Catholic writer, born in London.

== Biography ==
After three years at King's College London, Anderdon matriculated at Oxford, when about nineteen, and entered Balliol College, matriculating in 1835. Soon after, he won a scholarship at University College, Oxford, and graduated B.A. there in 1839. He received ordination in the Church of England, became vicar of Withyam, and in 1846 of St Margaret's Church, Leicester.

In 1850 Anderdon was received into the Catholic Church in Paris by Gustave Delacroix de Ravignan. Ordained at Oscott by Bishop Ullathorne in 1853, he was appointed a lecturer at Ushaw College and afterwards a preacher and confessor at Newman University Church in Dublin. During his stay in Ireland the Franciscan convent of Drumshambo was founded, mainly through his efforts. In 1856, he was called to London by his uncle, Cardinal Henry Edward Manning, whose secretary he remained until he joined the Jesuits in 1872. From 1875 to 1889 he lived in Manchester, working as preacher, spiritual guide, and writer.

== Works ==
Anderdon wrote a number of Catholic stories, many of which went through nine or ten editions and were translated into German and French. These include:

- Bonneval, the Story of the Fronde (1857)
- Owen Evans, the Catholic Crusoe (1862)
- Afternoons with the Saints (1863)
- In the Snow, Tales of Mt. St. Bernard (1866)
- Fasti Apostolici (1882)
- Evening with the Saints (1883)
- Britain's Early Faith (1887)

His apologetic writings include:

- Is Ritualism Honest?
- Controversial Papers (1878)
- Luther's Words and the Word of God" (1883)
- Luther at Table
- What sort of man was Luther? (1883)
- What do Catholics Really Believe?
- Confession to a Priest (1881)

Anderdon was also a prolific author for a number of periodicals, including the Weekly Register, the (English) Messenger of the Sacred Heart, the Xaverian, Merry England, the Month, and the Irish Monthly.

Anderdon's last works were The Old Religion of Taunton (1890) and Five Minutes' Sermons, the latter completed only in part at his death.
