= Robert Codrington (translator) =

English translator (c.1602–c.1665)

Robert Codrington (c.1602–c.1665) was an English writer, known as a translator.

== Life ==
From a Gloucestershire family, Codrington was elected a demy of Magdalen College, Oxford, 29 July 1619, at the age of 17, and took the degree of M.A. in 1626. After travelling, he returned home, married, and settled in Norfolk. In May 1641 he was imprisoned by the House of Commons for publishing an elegy on the Earl of Strafford.

In later life Codrington lived in London. According to Anthony Wood, he died in the Great Plague of 1665.

== Works ==
Codrington was a prolific writer and translator. His best known work was the Life and Death of Robert, Earl of Essex, London 1646, reprinted in the Harleian Miscellany; Anthony Wood regarded it as a partisan parliamentarian work. It was compiled using contemporary pamphlets. He wrote also the following works:

Translated from French:

- Treatise of the Knowledge of God, by Peter Du Moulin, London, 1634.
- The Memorials of Margaret de Valois, first wife of Henry IV of France, 1641, 1658, 1662.
- The fifth book of Caussin's Holy Court, London, 1650.
- Heptameron; or, The History of the Fortunate Lovers, by Margaret de Valois, London, 1654.
- Shibboleth; or, The Reformation of Several Places in the Translations of the French and of the English Bible: The Correction of Divers Common Opinions, History and other matters, by J. D'Esparre, 1655. The British Museum Catalogue also attributed to him the translation of A Declaration sent to the King of France and Spain from the Catholiques and Rebells in Ireland, 1642.

Translated from Latin:

- The History of Justin, taken out of the four and forty books of Trogus Pompeius, London, 1654, 1664, 1682.
- Robert Sanderson's Several Cases of Conscience discussed, 1660.
- Life and Death of Alexander the Great, by Q. Curtius Rufus, London, 1661, 1670, 1673.
- Ignoramus, a Comedy, London, 1662. John Sidney Hawkins, in his 1787 edition of this play, commented that Codrington had "preserved more of the satire, and even of the wit and humour of the original, than could well be expected".
- Prophecies of Christopher Kotterus, London, 1664.

He was also the author of the Life of Aesop in French and Latin, prefixed to Thomas Philipot's Aesop's Fables (1666), and translated The Troublesome and Hard Adventures in Love (1652), attributed to Miguel de Cervantes.

Codrington's English works were:

- A revised edition of Lodowick Lloyd's Pilgrimage of Princes, under the title The Marrow of History, or the Pilgrimage of Kings and Princes, 1653.
- A second part added to Francis Hawkins's Youth's Behaviour, 1664 and 1672, with a collection of proverbs that was also published separately in 1672.
- Prayers and Graces attached to Francis Seager's School of Virtue, 1620 (according to William Carew Hazlitt).
- His Majesty's Propriety and Dominion on the British Seas asserted, together with a true account of the Netherlanders' insupportable Insolencies, 1665.

The Happy Mind, or a compendious direction to attain to the same, London, 1640, is attributed to him, and the following poems: Seneca's Book of Consolation to Marcia, translated into an English poem, 1635 (Hazlitt); An Elegy to the Memory of Margaret, Lady Smith (Hazlitt); and An Elegy to the Memory of Elizabeth, Lady Ducey (manuscript, Hazlitt).
