= Frances Hawkins =

American politician (1921–2001)

Member of the Nevada State Assembly from Mineral County
- In office 1970–1972
- Preceded by: Joe Viani
- Succeeded by: Tim Hafen

Personal details
- Born: November 18, 1921 Winnemucca, Nevada, United States
- Died: November 15, 2001 (aged 79) Reno, Nevada, United States
- Party: Democratic

Frances Hawkins (November 18, 1921 – November 15, 2001) was an American politician. She served one term in the Nevada State Assembly as a Democrat.

== Early life and education ==
Hawkins was born on November 18, 1921, in Winnemucca, Nevada. She attended the University of Nevada, Reno, where she received her Bachelor of Arts degree.

== Career ==
Outside of politics, Hawkins worked as a teacher in Mineral County, Nevada.

She was elected to the Nevada State Assembly in 1970, when she defeated Republican challenger David A. Culbert in the general election. She requested a leave of absence from her teaching job to serve in the Assembly, but the request was denied by the Mineral County School Board. In April 1971, Hawkins helped to pass a bill that would grant state or government employees a leave of absence while serving in a public office.

Later that month, after the Nevada Legislature had adjourned, she attempted to resume her teaching job, but trustees on the Mineral County School Board released her from her teaching contract, and she was unable to teach. In May 1971, she sued the school district, asking for reimbursement of her salary and a contract for the 1971–1972 school year. Representatives for Hawkins argued that her termination was unlawful, as the school board did not follow Nevada's Professional Practices Act. Representatives for the school board argued that Hawkins had abandoned her position after being given a warning. In August 1971, a judge ruled that she would not be reimbursed, but that the school district was required to issue her a contract for the upcoming school year.

In 1972, Nevada redrew its legislative maps following decennial redistricting. The seat for Mineral County, which Hawkins held, was merged with those of Esmeralda County and Nye County to form one district covering all three counties. Hawkins ran for re-election in the newly-formed district, but lost to Republican Tim Hafen, the incumbent from Nye County. Following the initial count of Hafen's 2,743 votes to Hawkins' 2,707 (with Hawkins losing by 36 votes), Hawkins requested a recount, which showed she lost by 35 votes.

In July 1973, Governor of Nevada Mike O'Callaghan appointed her to be chairman of the advisory board of the newly created Nevada Youth Services Agency. In 1974, she filed to run for the Esmerlada-Mineral-Nye seat in the State Assembly, but lost in the primary election.

== Death ==
Hawkins died on November 15, 2001, in Reno, Nevada, at the age of 79.
