= C. R. Hawkins =

American politician, banker, and bank president

Member of the Missouri Senate from the 33rd district
- In office 1945–1959

Personal details
- Born: October 29, 1900 Brumley, Missouri, US
- Died: September 21, 1959 (aged 58)
- Party: Republican
- Spouse: Mabel Clair Foster
- Children: 4
- Occupation: politician, banker, teacher

Charles Roosevelt "Ted" Hawkins (October 29, 1900 – September 21, 1959) was an American politician, banker, and bank president from Brumley, Missouri, who served in the Missouri Senate. He was the youngest son of James M. Hawkins, a Union Army Civil War veteran who served as a state representative from 1881 until 1882. Hawkins twice received the St. Louis Globe-Democrat award for meritorious public service as the senator most effective in debate.
