= Jim Hawkins (radio presenter) =

British radio presenter

- Born: 1962 (age 63–64); Essex, England
- Occupation: Broadcaster
- Employer: BBC Radio Shropshire
- Awards: Sony Silver Award, 2002

Jim Hawkins (born 1962) is a former BBC radio presenter.

== Biography ==
=== Personal life ===
Hawkins was born in Essex and brought up there and in Warwickshire, England. He subsequently lived in Shropshire.

=== Career ===
Hawkins' broadcasting career began on a student radio station at Warwick University. He worked for independent local radio station Mercia Sound from 1981 to 1983. He joined BBC Radio 4 in 1984, writing and presenting the News Stand programme. Hawkins has worked for several commercial and BBC local radio stations across the United Kingdom in various roles on both sides of the microphone, including spells as a producer and manager.

Hawkins has also worked for a disability-rights group and as a newspaper journalist, hotel restaurant pianist, and stagehand; at one point he ran the coconut shy on Brighton Pier. During his career he has interviewed notable figures including Gordon Brown, Gene Simmons and Steve Cropper.

Hawkins hosted a programme every weekday from 9 am to 12 noon on BBC Radio Shropshire called "Jim Hawkins in the Morning". Hawkins used Twitter to interact with listeners during the show, having been persuaded to try Twitter after finding his Facebook experience disappointing. Hawkins also hosted a Saturday night programme entitled "Saturday Night with Jim Hawkins" broadcast by BBC Shropshire, BBC Hereford & Worcester, and BBC Radio Stoke. The show was first broadcast on 4 April 2009 and concluded on 5 January 2013. Since the December 2011 issue, on whose front cover he was pictured, he has written a monthly column for Shropshire Life magazine.

== Awards ==
In 2002, Hawkins received a silver Sony Radio Academy Award in the "interactive" category, for his drive-time programme The Baldy Brothers on Century FM. He was also highly commended at the BT sponsored Regional News and Current Affairs Awards. Hawkins was one of five shortlisted for the 2006 Sony Radio Academy Speech Broadcaster of the Year Award.
