= Chris Hawkins (American football) =

American football player (born 1986)

No. 35
- Position: Cornerback

Personal information
- Born: April 12, 1986 (age 40); Walker, Louisiana, U.S.
- Listed height: 6 ft 1 in (1.85 m)
- Listed weight: 184 lb (83 kg)

Career information
- High school: Walker
- College: LSU
- NFL draft: 2010: undrafted

Career history
- Jacksonville Jaguars (2010)*; Baltimore Ravens (2010)*; Tennessee Titans (2010–2011); Philadelphia Eagles (2013)*
- * Offseason or practice squad member only

Career NFL statistics
- Total tackles: 14
- Stats at Pro Football Reference

Chris Hawkins (born April 12, 1986) is an American former professional football player who was a cornerback in the National Football League (NFL). He played college football for the LSU Tigers. He was signed as an undrafted free agent by the Jacksonville Jaguars on April 26, 2010, after the 2010 NFL draft.

Hawkins was also a member of the Baltimore Ravens, Tennessee Titans and Philadelphia Eagles.

== Early life ==
Hawkins was born and raised in Walker, Louisiana, where he attended Walker High School.
