= Henry Hawkins (Jesuit) =

English Jesuit writer

Henry Hawkins (1577 – 18 August 1646) was an English Jesuit writer. His best known work is the emblem book Partheneia Sacra: Or the Mysterious and Delicious Garden of the Sacred Parthenes (originally published in 1633; reprinted in 1950 and again in 1971).

== Life ==
Henry was the son of Sir Thomas Hawkins and Anne Pettyt. He was baptized in Boughton under Blean on 8 October 1577. He married Aphra Norton in February 1604, and was widowed in January 1605.

Hawkins entered the English College, Rome, as a mature student on 19 March 1609, was ordained on 25 March 1614, and entered the Society of Jesus in 1615. After serving many years on the English Mission he died in Ghent on 18 August 1646.

== Works ==
- History of S. Elizabeth (Rouen, 1632)
- The admirable life of S. Aldegond (1632), a translation of La vie admirable de la princesse Ste. Aldegonde by Etienne Binet
- Partheneia Sacra (Rouen, 1633)
- The Devout Heart (Rouen, 1634), a translation of Le coeur dévot by Etienne Luzvic
